= List of Dragons' Den (British TV programme) offers Series 1-10 =

The following is a list of offers made on the British reality television series Dragons' Den in Series 1–10, originally aired during 2005–2012. 104 episodes of Dragons' Den were broadcast consisting of at least 754 pitches. A total of 129 pitches were successful, with 26 offers from the dragons rejected by the entrepreneurs and 599 failing to receive an offer of investment.

== Series overview ==
Series	Episodes	Start	End	Network
Series 1 (2005)	6	4 January 2005	8 March 2005	BBC Two (TV channel)
Series 2 (2005)	6	15 November 2005	20 December 2005	BBC Two (TV channel)
Series 3 (2006)	8	3 August 2006	21 September 2006	BBC Two (TV channel)
Series 4 (2007)	6	7 February 2007	21 March 2007	BBC Two (TV channel)
Series 5 (2007)	6	15 October 2007	25 December 2007	BBC Two (TV channel)
Series 6 (2008)	8	21 July 2008	8 September 2008	BBC Two (TV channel)
Series 7 (2009)	8	15 July 2009	2 September 2009	BBC Two (TV channel)
Series 8 (2010)	10	14 July 2010	13 September 2010	BBC Two (TV channel)
Series 9 (2011)	10	31 July 2011	3 October 2011	BBC Two (TV channel)
Series 10 (2012)	13	9 September 2012	27 December 2012	BBC Two (TV channel)

== Successful pitches ==
=== Series 1 ===
Episode	First aired	Entrepreneur(s)	Company or product name	Money requested (£)	Equity Given %	Description of product	Investing Dragon(s)	Result After Filming	Website	Fate
Episode 1	4 January 2005	Charles Ejogo	Umbrolly	150,000	40	Multimedia vending unit selling umbrellas and adverts	Duncan Bannatyne & Peter Jones	Signed	N/A	Dissolved (2010)
Episode 2	11 January 2005	Tracey Ann Graily	Grails Ltd	120,000	40	Tailor-made suits for businesswomen	Doug Richard & Rachel Elnaugh	Signed		Dissolved (2006)
Episode 3	18 January 2005	Tracie Herrtage	Le Beanock	54,000	49	A beanbag hammock	Rachel Elnaugh	Signed (Note: Rachel Elnaugh returned her equity stake in 2016. Dissolved by 2018.)		Dissolved (2018)
Episode 3	18 January 2005	John and Phillip Petty	IV Cam, Industrial Control Systems	50,000	30	A 3D measuring system using camera technology	Peter Jones & Doug Richard	Failed (Note: IV Cam, Industrial Control Systems' deal did not materialise due to a difference in ideas about taking the product to market. Peter Jones and Doug Richard preferred a licensing model rather than manufacture. One month after the airing of the show the company instead took out a bank loan. Remains active.)		Active
Episode 4	25 January 2005	Paul Thomas	Mycorrhizal Systems	75,000	25	Land for a truffle farm	Simon Woodroffe	Failed (Note: Mycorrhizal Systems declined the investment after filming. Remains active.)		Active
Episode 5	1 February 2005	Elizabeth Galton	Elizabeth Galton Ltd	110,000	30	Custom-made jewellery	Duncan Bannatyne & Rachel Elnaugh	Failed (Note: Elizabeth Galton rejected Elnaugh's offer after filming and only accepted Bannatyne's offer after negotiating the remaining £55,000 from another private investor. Galton has since dissolved the company and now works as a designer at Aurum Group Limited; owners of Goldsmiths the jewellers.)		Dissolved (2008)
Episode 6	8 February 2005	Nik Rawcliff and Paddy Radcliff	Snowbone	75,000	33.3	Handle attachment for snowboards	Rachel Elnaugh	Failed (Note: Rachel Elnaugh provided Snowbone with £7,000, spent on branding, prototypes and a website. However Elnaugh later withdrew and the deal was never fully finalised. Remains active.)		Active
Episode 6	8 February 2005	Huw Gwyther	Visual Talent Ltd	175,000	40	Wonderland high-end fashion and culture magazine	Peter Jones	Signed		Active

=== Series 2 ===
Episode	First aired	Entrepreneur(s)	Company or product name	Money requested (£)	Equity Given %	Description of product	Investing Dragon(s)	Result After Filming	Website	Fate
Episode 1	15 November 2005	Dominic Killinger	Square Mile	150,000	40 (38% if targets are hit)	Wireless broadband supplier to UK marinas	Theo Paphitis & Peter Jones	Signed (Note: Square Mile's investment was completed. Sold to BT for £150,000 in January 2008.)	N/A	Sold (2008)
Episode 2	22 November 2005	Danny Bamping	Bedlam Puzzles	100,000	30	3-D puzzles	Rachel Elnaugh & Theo Paphitis	Failed (Note: 3-D puzzles decided against the investment after filming and opted to take out a bank loan. Dissolved by 2013.)		Dissolved (2013)
Episode 3	29 November 2005	Julie White	Truly Madly Baby	75,000	45	Baby products, via party evenings and web	Peter Jones	Failed (Note: Truly Madly Baby declined the investment after filming and accepted a deal from another source. Dissolved by 2010.)		Dissolved (2010)
Episode 5	13 December 2005	Paul Cockle	The Generating Company	160,000	40	Contemporary circus shows	Peter Jones & Theo Paphitis	Signed (Note: The Generating Company's investment was completed. Dissolved by 2017.)		Dissolved (2017)
Episode 6	20 December 2005	David Lees	Mode Al	225,000	50	Custom furniture to house technology	Theo Paphitis & Duncan Bannatyne	Failed (Note: Mode Al declined the investment after filming. Lees stated that he was advised to accept a bank loan instead. Dissolved in 2022.)		Dissolved (2022)

=== Series 3 ===
Episode	First aired	Entrepreneur(s)	Company or product name	Money requested (£)	Equity Given %	Description of product	Investing Dragon(s)	Result After Filming	Website	Fate
Episode 1	3 August 2006	James Seddon	Eggxactly	75,000	40	Water-free egg cooker	Richard Farleigh & Peter Jones	Failed (Note: James Seddon stated in the follow-up series Dragon’s Den: Where Are They Now? that he was unable to agree on distribution terms with Jones and Farleigh. As of 2021 Eggxactly is active but is still yet to produce the product.)		Active
Episode 2	10 August 2006	Gary Taylor	Alpine Cleaning	200,000	40	Franchised HGV cleaning service	Deborah Meaden & Theo Paphitis	Failed (Note: Alpine Cleaning eventually decided against the investment and opted to take out a bank loan. Company was dissolved in 2011.)		Dissolved (2011)
Episode 3	17 August 2006	Matthew Hazell	First Light Solutions	100,000	30	A sonar-based man-overboard detection system	Richard Farleigh	Signed		Dissolved (2012)
Episode 4	24 August 2006	Ian Chamings	MixAlbum	150,000	40	Dance download site with digital mixing software	Deborah Meaden & Theo Paphitis	Signed		Active
Episode 5	31 August 2006	Richard Lee & Daren Duraidi	Dr Cap	150,000	50	Chain of shops selling baseball caps	Duncan Bannatyne	Failed (Note: Dr Cap's investment was never completed. Dissolved in 2020.)		Dissolved (2020)
Episode 6	7 September 2006	Stephen Bellis	Nuts Poker League	50,000 (received 65,000)	40	Pub-based tournament poker league	Theo Paphitis & Deborah Meaden	Failed (Note: The Nuts Poker League failed due diligence and has since merged with Redtooth Entertainment.)		Sold (2014)
Episode 7	14 September 2006	Peter Sesay	Autosafe	100,000	50	A seat-belt height adjuster	Peter Jones & Duncan Bannatyne	Unfulfilled (Note: Peter Sesay died shortly after filming and the product was subsequently never released. Bannatyne and Jones were listed as the company's directors at the time of dissolution. Bannatyne gave his condolences to Sesay's family in person in the follow-up series Dragon’s Den: Where Are They Now?)	N/A	Dissolved (2011)
Episode 8	21 September 2006	Ian Daintith & Richard Adams	Coin Metrics	200,000	25	Technology to monitor cash operations for slot machines	Deborah Meaden & Theo Paphitis	Failed (Note: Ian Daintith & Richard Adams declined the investment after filming following approaches from other investors. They sold Coin Metrics in 2007 for £685,000.)		Sold (2007)

=== Series 4 ===
Episode	First aired	Entrepreneur(s)	Company or product name	Money requested (£)	Equity Given %	Description of product	Investing Dragon(s)	Result After Filming	Website	Fate
Episode 1	7 February 2007	Levi Roots	Reggae Reggae Sauce	50,000	40	Spicy BBQ sauce	Richard Farleigh & Peter Jones	Signed		Active
Episode 1	7 February 2007	Anthony Coates-Smith & Alistair Turner	Igloo	160,000	22.5	Specialist chilled and frozen transport services	Duncan Bannatyne & Richard Farleigh	Signed (Note: Igloo's investment was completed, however the company was dissolved by 2013. Shortly before the dissolution, Igloo were reported to have illegally deducted wages of employees and ordered to repay with penalties induced.)		Dissolved (2013)
Episode 2	14 February 2007	Imran Hakim	iTeddy	140,000	40	Classic teddy bear with integrated media technology	Peter Jones & Theo Paphitis	Signed		Active
Episode 3	21 February 2007	Roger Hind	Rotamate	85,000	40	A clothes airer that protects washing from the rain	Deborah Meaden & Richard Farleigh	Failed (Note: Rotamate's investment does not appear to have been completed. Company was listed as dissolved in 2011.)		Dissolved (2011)
Episode 3	21 February 2007	Denise Hutton	Razzamataz Theatre Schools	50,000	25	A chain of dance, drama and singing schools for children.	Duncan Bannatyne	Signed (Note: Razzmatazz's investment was completed. Denise Hutton-Gosney bought back Duncan Bannatyne's stake in 2014 for £70,000.)		Active
Episode 4	28 February 2007	Christian Lane	Foldio	80,000	35	Stationery folder that halves size of paper without creasing	Theo Paphitis	Signed (Note: Foldio's investment did complete, however Theo Paphitis gave up involvement in the company in 2011. Company was dissolved in 2015.)		Dissolved (2015)
Episode 4	28 February 2007	Casey Jones	Foot Deodoriser	100,000	50	Sanitiser that kills bacteria within shoes	Deborah Meaden & Richard Farleigh	Failed (Note: The Foot Deodoriser deal did not go through due to Meaden and Farleigh's concerns over where Casey Jones's efforts were focussed. Tiger Mobiles have reported the company is now dissolved.)		Dissolved
Episode 5	7 March 2007	Chris Haines	Safe-T-First	95,000	30	Emergency light	Deborah Meaden & Theo Paphitis	Failed (Note: Chris Haines declined the investment after filming, deciding to explore other options. Remains active.)		Active
Episode 5	7 March 2007	David Pybus	Scents of Time	80,000	40	Perfumes from historical times which are re-created for today	Peter Jones & Theo Paphitis	Signed		Dissolved (2012)
Episode 6	7 March 2007	Peter Ensinger and David Baker	Standby Saver	100,000	50	Device that cuts off electric current to home appliances on stand-by	All five Dragons (Note: The Standby Saver was the first pitch in the UK show's history to accept an offer from all five dragons as investors.)	Failed (Note: The Standby Saver investment was not fulfilled due to Ensinger's and Baker's failure to obtain a patent. Dissolved by 2014.)		Dissolved (2014)

=== Series 5 ===
Episode	First aired	Entrepreneur(s)	Company or product name	Money requested (£)	Equity Given %	Description of product	Investing Dragon(s)	Result After Filming	Website	Fate
Episode 1	15 October 2007	Celia Norowzian & Ian Forshew	Beach Break Live	50,000	25	Events company	Peter Jones	Failed (Note: Beach Break Live decided to reject the offer after filming and later merged with Outgoing Travel Ltd. Company was dissolved by 2020.)		Dissolved (2020)
Episode 1	15 October 2007	Laban Roomes	Goldgenie (formerly Midas Touch)	60,000	40	Mobile gold plating service	James Caan	Signed (Note: Midas Touch re-purchased James Caan's equity in 2011. Remains active.)		Active
Episode 2	22 October 2007	Sarah Lu	youdoodoll	35,000	45	Personalisable doll	Deborah Meaden	Signed		Dissolved (2014)
Episode 2	22 October 2007	Emmie Matthews & Ed Stevens	Gaming Alerts	200,000	30	Gaming referral website	Theo Paphitis	Signed (Note: Gaming Alerts investment was successful. However the company was dissolved in 2011 with Theo Paphitis still holding his 30% stake in the company.)		Dissolved (2011)
Episode 3	29 October 2007	Mark Champkins	Concentrate Design	100,000	40	Products that help children at school	Peter Jones	Signed		Dissolved (2018)
Episode 4	5 November 2007	Max McMurdo	Reestore	50,000	30	Functional pieces of furniture from waste objects	Deborah Meaden & Theo Paphitis	Signed (Note: Deborah Meaden & Theo Paphitis no longer hold equity in Reestore as of 2021. Remains active.)		Active
Episode 4	5 November 2007	Jamie Jenkinson	Cush'n'Shade	100,000	40	A fold-away screen that acts as a cushion and sun shade	Deborah Meaden & Peter Jones	Failed (Note: Cush'n'Shade's investment was never completed. Company entered voluntary liquidation in 2012, however continues to trade in Ireland as of 2022.)		Active
Episode 5	19 November 2007	James Halliburton	Water Buoy	200,000	25	A device to rescue items that have been lost overboard.	Peter Jones & Theo Paphitis	Failed (Note: James Halliburton eventually decided against the investment in Water Buoy and has branched into different areas. Remains active.)		Active
Episode 5	19 November 2007	Shane Lake and Tony Charles	HungryHouse	100,000	50	An online takeaway ordering service	James Caan & Duncan Bannatyne	Failed (Note: Hungry House declined Caan and Bannatyne's investment after filming and raised £150,000 from alternative investors. Company merged with fellow online food order and delivery service Just Eat in 2017.)		Sold
Episode 6	26 November 2007	Ian Helmore	Steri Spray	145,000	40	UV Sterilising system for shower heads	Deborah Meaden & Theo Paphitis	Signed		Active
Episode 6	26 November 2007	Mark and Eleanor Davis	Caribbean Ready Meals	100,000	50	Caribbean ready meals made using genuine Jamaican and Trinidadian recipes	James Caan & Duncan Bannatyne	Signed (Note: Caribbean Ready Meals received Bannatyne's investment, however following issues with Mark and Eleanor Davis's major debts from previous failed business ventures, the product was never released and the company was dissolved in 2010.)		Dissolved (2010)
Episode 7	3 December 2007	Sammy French	Fit Fur Life	100,000	50	A dog treadmill	James Caan	Signed (Note: Fit Fur Life's investment was successful. James Caan no longer holds equity as of 2011, retiring as company director the same year. Remains active.)		Active
Episode 7	3 December 2007	Jerry Mantalvanos & Paul Merker	JPM Eco Logistics	100,000	40	Environmentally friendly haulage company	Deborah Meaden & Theo Paphitis	Signed (Note: JPM Eco Logistics investment was completed, however the company fell into financial difficulties less than a year later. Despite receiving a further £25,000 bailout from the dragons, the company was dissolved in 2014.)	N/A	Dissolved (2014)
Episode 8	11 December 2007	Peter Moule	ElectroExpo (renamed Chocbox)	150,000	32	Plastic housing that protects cable connections	Duncan Bannatyne & James Caan	Signed (Note: ElectroExpo's investment was completed. James Caan no longer holds equity in as of 2011, retiring as company director the same year. Bannatyne retains his share of the business as of 2022.)		Active
Episode 9	18 December 2007	Amanda Jones & James Brown	Red Button Design	50,000	10	A water transport, sanitation and storage device for the developing world	All five Dragons	Failed (Note: Red Button Design declined the investment after filming, accepting a £45,000 grant from Oxford University instead. Company was dissolved in 2014.)		Dissolved (2014)

=== Series 6 ===
Episode	First aired	Entrepreneur(s)	Company or product name	Money requested (£)	Equity Given %	Description of product	Investing Dragon(s)	Result After Filming	Website	Fate
Episode 1	21 July 2008	Jamie Turner	Hamfatter	75,000	30	A music band	Peter Jones	Signed (Note: Hamfatter's investment was completed. They released their last material in 2011 and dissolved in 2016. Peter Jones held no equity from 2010 and retired his role as director the same year.)		Dissolved (2016)
Episode 1	21 July 2008	Julia Charles & Amy Goldthorpe	D4M Ltd	75,000	40	Events management company	Duncan Bannatyne & James Caan	Signed		Dissolved (2011)
Episode 2	28 July 2008	Victoria McGrane	Neurotica	56,000 (received 75,000)	35	Fashion designer	Peter Jones	Signed (Note: Neurotica did receive investment from Peter Jones, however the company was dissolved in 2013.)	N/A	Dissolved (2013)
Episode 3	4 August 2008	Ming Yun	Light Emotions	40,000	30	Glow in the dark products	Peter Jones	Failed (Note: Light Emotions investment broke down after filming. Ming Yun stated he was more in need of help with marketing that Peter Jones was unwilling to give. Company was dissolved in 2012.)		Dissolved (2012)
Episode 3	4 August 2008	Michael Cotton	DDN Ltd	250,000	25	Misfuelling prevention device	Theo Paphitis & Deborah Meaden	Failed (Note: DDN Ltd declined the investment after filming stating that on reflection they felt the equity given was too high. Remains active.)		Dissolved (2026)
Episode 4	11 August 2008	Charlotte Evans & Caroyln Jarvis	Buggy Boot	80,000	30	Storage solution for pushchairs	Deborah Meaden	Signed (Note: Buggy Boot's was completed, however the company failed to make a profit and was dissolved in 2012. Deborah Meaden was still listed as a shareholder at the time of dissolution.)		Dissolved (2012)
Episode 4	11 August 2008	Andrew Harsley	Rapstrap	150,000	50	Waste-free cable-tie	Duncan Bannatyne & James Caan	Signed		Active
Episode 5	18 August 2008	Neil and Laura Westwood	Magic Whiteboard	100,000	40	Portable whiteboard in the form of a roll	Theo Paphitis and Deborah Meaden	Signed (Note: Magic Whiteboard bought back the 40% shareholding held by Theo and Deborah in April 2015.)		Active
Episode 5	18 August 2008	Guy Unwin & Caroline Kavanagh	Planit Products	200,000	40	Toastabags	James Caan	Failed (Note: Planit Products did not follow-up with James Caan's investment and secured funding through a bank loan. Remains active.)		Active
Episode 6	25 August 2008	Guy Portelli	Guy Portelli Sculpture Studio	70,000 (received 80,000)	25	Collection of 18 sculptures	James Caan, Peter Jones & Theo Paphitis	Signed		Active
Episode 6	25 August 2008	Raymond Smith	Magic Pizza	50,000	30	Device designed to eliminate a 'soggy middle'	Theo Paphitis & Peter Jones	Signed (Note: Magic Pizza's investment was completed, however the company failed to generate a profit and the company was dissolved in 2012.)	N/A	Dissolved (2012)
Episode 7	1 September 2008	Dominic Lawrence, Simeone Salik & Janice Dalton	Blindsinabox	40,000	50	Temporary, easy-to-install blinds	Duncan Bannatyne & James Caan	Signed		Active
Episode 7	1 September 2008	Christian Richardson & Rachel Watkyn	Tiny Box	53,000 (received 60,000)	40	Unique recycled packaging company	Theo Paphitis & Peter Jones	Signed		Active
Episode 8	8 September 2008	Paul Tinton	ProWaste Management Services	200,000	40	Construction waste recycling service	Duncan Bannatyne & Deborah Meaden	Signed (Note: ProWaste Management Services' investment was completed. Duncan Bannatyne & Deborah Meaden retired their positions as directors in 2011. Remains active.)		Active

=== Series 7 ===
Episode	First aired	Entrepreneur(s)	Company or product name	Money requested (£)	Equity Given %	Description of product	Investing Dragon(s)	Result After Filming	Website	Fate
Episode 1	15 July 2009	Rupert Sweet-Escott	Sweet-Escott Aviation Ltd	80,000	49%	An aviation renewable energy supply company	James Caan	Signed (Note: Sweet-Escott Aviation 's investment was completed, however James Caan retired as director less than a year after the episode's broadcast and the company was dissolved in 2016.)		Dissolved (2016)
Episode 1	15 July 2009	Steve Smith	TrueCall Ltd	100,000	12.5	A device to stop nuisance phone calls	Peter Jones	Failed (Note: TrueCall Ltd investment was not completed. Remains active.)		Active
Episode 2	22 July 2009	Richard Enion & Michael Davis	BassToneSlap	50,000	40	High energy drumming performance for corporate team building	Peter Jones & Theo Paphitis	Failed (Note: BassToneSlap's investment does not appear to have been completed. Companies House listed it as dissolved in 2012.)		Dissolved (2012)
Episode 2	22 July 2009	Sharon Wright	Talpa Products Ltd	50,000 (received 80,000)	22.5	Magnamole - A device designed to thread cables through cavity walls	Duncan Bannatyne & James Caan	Deal Withdrawn (Note: {{See Talpa Products Ltd allegations}})		Dissolved (2013)
Episode 3	29 July 2009	Lawrence Webb & Frank Drewett	Lid Lifters	50,000	50	A labour-saving device for lifting wheelie bin lids	Peter Jones	Failed (Note: Lid Lifters investment was never completed. Company was dissolved in 2018.)		Dissolved (2018)
Episode 3	29 July 2009	Oliver Richmond & Toby Richmond	Servicing Stop	100,000	30	A bespoke nationwide car servicing company	Deborah Meaden	Failed (Note: Deborah Meaden withdrew her investment in Servicing Stop during due diligence, stating her concern over the number of customer complaints regarding the service it provided. Remains active.)		Active
Episode 4	5 August 2009	Tony Earnshaw & Stephen Pearsons	UK Commercial Cleaning	100,000	35	Commercial cleaning company	Duncan Bannatyne	Signed (Note: Duncan Bannatyne retired from his role as director of UK Commercial Cleaning in 2011.)		Active
Episode 4	5 August 2009	Karen O'Neill & Karen Coombes	KCO Inline Ice Skating Ltd	100,000	45	New inline skate that allows dancers to perform ice-dancing moves on all surfaces	Theo Paphitis	Failed (Note: KCO Inline Ice Skating decided against the investment after filming. Remains active.)		Active
Episode 5	12 August 2009	Carol Savage & Jason White	MyDish.co.uk	100,000	15 (Note: Deborah Meaden increased her stake in MyDish.co.uk to 19.60% after filming.)	Online community for sharing recipes with friends and family	Deborah Meaden	Signed		Active
Episode 5	12 August 2009	Jane Rafter	Slinks	75,000	40	Sandals with interchangeable uppers	Theo Paphitis & James Caan	Failed (Note: Slinks did not receive investment from the dragons following discussions after filming, with Jane Rafter citing displeasure with their visions for the business. Remains active.)		Active
Episode 6	19 August 2009	Jason Roberts	Tech21	150,000	40	Protective cases for laptops, mobile phones etc. using a material called D30	Peter Jones & Theo Paphitis	Failed (Note: Tech21 are not believed to have contacted Jones or Paphitis after filming, citing the products success without the investment. Remains active.)		Active
Episode 7	26 August 2009	Michael Pritchard	The Anyway Spray	125,000	25	Invention that allows every last drop of liquid to be used in multi-directional household product sprays	Theo Paphitis & Peter Jones	Failed (Note: The Anyway Spray did not receive investment after filming. Remains active.)		Active
Episode 7	26 August 2009	Kay Russell	Physicool Ltd	100,000	30	A bandage that reduces the temperature gently via evaporation	Deborah Meaden	Unclear (Note: Physicool's investment status remains unclear. The website states the pitch was successful, however there is no record of Russell sharing any further input from Meaden. Tiger Mobiles have suggested Kay Russell rejected the offer after filming. Remains active.)		Active
Episode 8	2 September 2009	Michael Lea	Earle's	100,000	35	Food truck franchise that sells hot and cold foods	Peter Jones	Failed (Note: Earle's investment was not completed after filming and the company has since dissolved.)		Dissolved (2014)
Episode 8	2 September 2009	David & Patti Bailey	Motor Mouse	100,000 (received 120,000)	40	Wireless mice shaped like famous sports cars	James Caan	Signed (Note: Motor Mouse's investment was completed. Company was however listed as dissolved in 2017, though they continue to trade through their website.)		Dissolved (2017)

=== Series 8 ===
Episode	First aired	Entrepreneur(s)	Company or product name	Money requested (£)	Equity Given %	Description of product	Investing Dragon(s)	Result After Filming	Website	Fate
Episode 1	14 July 2010	Geoff Bowen	Pebblebed Vineyard (rebranded as Darts Farm)	60,000	40	The chance for wine lovers to rent their own vines in a vineyard	Duncan Bannatyne	Unclear (Note: Pebblebed Vineyard's website implies the investment was received, however there is no record of Bannatyne ever being listed as a shareholder or director. Company continued to trade despite Bowen's death in 2018. Sold in 2022.)		Sold (2022)
Episode 1	14 July 2010	Kirsty Henshaw	Worthenshaw's (rebranded as Kirsty's)	65,000	30	A frozen dessert which is a dairy-free healthy alternative to ice cream	Duncan Bannatyne and Peter Jones	Signed (Note: Worthenshaw's received the investment and has since successfully re-purchased the 30% stake from Jones and Bannatyne. Jones has since hinted that he was however dissatisfied with the return he made on the investment. Remains active.)		Active
Episode 2	21 July 2010	Angela Newman	Vintage Patisserie	100,000	39	A vintage hosting company that runs parties	Deborah Meaden and Theo Paphitis	Unclear (Note: Vintage Patisserie's investment remains unclear. Remains active, however there is no record of Meaden or Paphitis ever being listed as shareholders or directors.)		Active
Episode 3	26 July 2010	Dennis Fuller	Golfers' Mate	100,000	25	A 3-in-1 golf accessory that includes a pitch-mark repairer, ball marker, t-peg and sharpener	James Caan	Failed (Note: Golfer's Mate's investment was never completed and the company dissolved in 2013.)		Dissolved (2013)
Episode 3	26 July 2010	Peter Harrison and Wesley Downham	FGH Security	75,000 (but received 100,000)	20	A security company that provides staffed security, electronic security (alarms) and CCTV	Peter Jones and Theo Paphitis	Failed (Note: FGH Security rejected the investment after filming, stating a difference in visions for the business from the dragons. Remains active.)		Active
Episode 4	2 August 2010	Layla Bennett	Hawksdrift Falconry	50,000	25	Birds of prey business which does pest control, falconry displays and a gift delivery service	Duncan Bannatyne	Signed (Note: Hawksdrift Falconry's investment was completed. Layla Bennett stated that she repaid the investment within two and a half years after using the money only to buy vehicles and hire an accountant.)		Active
Episode 4	2 August 2010	Tim Williams and Tom Hogan	Lumacoustics	50,000	40	An electronic graffiti wall	Peter Jones & Deborah Meaden	Failed (Note: Lumacoustics declined the investment after filming. Remains active.)		Active
Episode 5	9 August 2010	Sarah & Mike Longthorn & Laura Booth	WedgeWelly	65,000	30	Wellington boots with a wedge	Theo Paphitis	Signed		Dissolved (2020)
Episode 6	16 August 2010	Faizal Khan & Gary Hilman	Peel Engineering	80,000	30	The world's smallest production car, also powered by an electric motor	James Caan	Signed (Note: Peel Engineering continues to trade. James Caan's equity was renegotiated to 20% after filming and retains his share as of 2021.)		Active
Episode 6	16 August 2010	Ralf Klinnert	Funky Moves	120,000	50	An electronic interactive sports cone game	Peter Jones and Theo Paphitis	Failed (Note: Funky Moves' investment is not believed to have been completed. There is no record of Peter Jones or Theo Paphitis being listed as directors or shareholders. Dissolved by 2020.)		Dissolved (2020)
Episode 7	24 August 2010	Letitia Valentine & Alexander Lewis	SURVIVA – SURVIVA JAK	75,000	45	Jacket that has foil lining to prevent hypothermia	Deborah Meaden	Failed (Note: Surviva Jak did not receive investment after filming but have continued to trade. Letitia Valentine left the company 3 months after the episode's broadcast.)		Active
Episode 7	24 August 2010	Richard Blakesley & Chris Barnardo	The Wand Company	200,000	30	"Kymera" – a buttonless gesture-based universal remote control	Duncan Bannatyne	Signed		Active
Episode 8	31 August 2010	Patrick van der Vorst	ValueMyStuff	100,000	40	An online antique valuation service	Deborah Meaden and Theo Paphitis	Signed (Note: ValueMyStuff received their investment, however the company was fully sold in 2015 to German rival Auctionata.)		Sold (2015)
Episode 8	31 August 2010	Chris Elsworthy	Power8 Workshop	150,000	30	Power8 workshop, a power tool set that is the world's first cordless bench top system	Duncan Bannatyne and Peter Jones	Failed (Note: Power8 Workshop declined the investment after filming citing displeasure with the show's format, instead opting for investment from crowd funding page Kickstarter, continuing to trade since. Dissolved by 2025)		Dissolved (2025)
Episode 9	6 September 2010	Solvej Biddle	Content and Calm (Traykit)	80,000	23	A backpack-tray for use on cars, planes, etc. that prevents children's toys rolling onto the floor	Peter Jones and Deborah Meaden	Failed (Note: Content and Calm did not receive investment after filming and since been dissolved following its parent company entering liquidation.)		Dissolved (2016)
Episode 9	6 September 2010	Adam Weaver	Proppa	50,000	20	A website that sells vehicle accessories	Duncan Bannatyne	Unclear (Note: Proppa announced in 2011 that the company had entered liquidation, and was dissolved by 2014. Adam Weaver declined to comment on whether Bannatyne's investment was received. Dissolved by 2014.)		Dissolved (2014)
Episode 10	13 September 2010	Ian Taylor	Media Displays	80,000	45	A mobile digital advertising service	James Caan	Failed (Note: Media Displays investment was not received after filming, however the company benefited from the exposure and continues to trade.)		Liquidation (2023)

=== Series 9 ===
Episode	First aired	Entrepreneur(s)	Company or product name	Money requested (£)	Equity Given %	Description of product	Investing Dragon(s)	Result After Filming	Website	Fate
Episode 1	31 July 2011	Georgette Hewitt	The Present Club	60,000	30	A website for buying gifts for children	Peter Jones and Theo Paphitis	Signed		Dissolved (2017)
Episode 1	31 July 2011	Chris Hopkins	Ploughcroft Solar	120,000	25	A company that installs solar panels in homes	Deborah Meaden and Theo Paphitis	Signed (Note: Ploughcroft Solar received investment from the dragons and re-purchased their shares in 2012. Dissolved by 2024.)		Dissolved (2024)
Episode 2	7 August 2011	Christian Hartmann, Martin McLaughlin, Tom Callard	Love Da Pop	70,000	45	A business turning the old popcorn treat into a modern mainstream snack	Peter Jones	Signed (Note: Love Da Pop did receive investment from Peter Jones, however the company has dissolved as of 2015.)	N/A	Dissolved (2015)
Episode 2	7 August 2011	Liz and Alan Colleran	Raskelf Memory Foam (Duvalay)	80,000	26	A zip-up memory foam mattress and duvet combo	Hilary Devey	Signed		Active
Episode 3	14 August 2011	Peter and Michelle Hart	Fun Fancy Dress	100,000	50	Fancy-dress shop business and franchise	Duncan Bannatyne	Failed (Note: Fun Fancy Dress declined the investment after filming stating growth had doubled since their appearance on the show. The company was, however, dissolved as of 2017 with Peter Hart launching his own business investment website.)		Dissolved (2017)
Episode 4	21 August 2011	Bob Davis	Unique Ideas UK	50,000	20 (15 once product launched & Dragon getting a return)	Corporate events and entertainment including the Cyclone GameCube	Hilary Devey	Failed (Note: Unique Ideas UK's investment did not complete, however the company continues to trade.)		Active
Episode 4	21 August 2011	Robert Lewis	Rollersigns	100,000	100 (49 once specific order is proved)	Advertising on belt banners	Peter Jones	Failed (Note: Rollersigns investment is believed to have been withdrawn due to the company's failure to prove a particular order had been placed as stated in the den.)		Sold (2021)
Episode 5	28 August 2011	Kate Castle	BoginaBag	50,000	30	Lightweight, portable toilet	Theo Paphitis	Signed		Dissolved (2018)
Episode 5	28 August 2011	Henry Buckley and JJ Harding	JogPost Limited	50,000	20	Direct marketing company specialising in leaflet distribution	Deborah Meaden	Failed (Note: JogPost Limited declined the investment after filming, citing the product's growing success without investment. Remains active.)		Active
Episode 6	4 September 2011	Andy Bates	AB Performance	50,000	35	Bike-engined car manufacturing, servicing, repairs and tuning company	Peter Jones	Signed		Dissolved (2022)
Episode 7	12 September 2011	Nick Cross, Richard Hadden and Sebastian Stoddart	barMate	50,000	30	Hands-free pint-pulling product	Deborah Meaden and Theo Paphitis	Failed (Note: barMate's investment does not appear to have been completed. The company was dissolved in 2022.)		Dissolved (2022)
Episode 7	12 September 2011	Simon Booth	Kiddimoto	75,000	30	Children's balance bikes	Hilary Devey and Duncan Bannatyne	Failed (Note: Kiddimoto withdrew from the investment after Simon Booth claimed the company's profits soared following the episode's broadcast. Devey and Bannatyne however stated they withdrew investment after discovering a secret shareholder during due diligence.)		Active
Episode 8	19 September 2011	Ryan Ashmore and Liam Webb	RKA Records (renamed Savage Digital Ltd)	50,000	79	Record label	Duncan Bannatyne	Signed (Note: RKA Record's investment at 79% remains the largest amount of equity ever given away in the den. Bannatyne renamed the business to "Bannatyne Records" in 2012, reducing his share to 51%, before selling the company to Sony Music in 2013. Renamed again to Savage Digital Limited, the company remains active on Companies House but appears to be dormant in trade.)		Sold (2013)
Episode 8	19 September 2011	Aidan Quinn and Gemma Roe	EcoHab Homes and O-Pod Buildings	75,000	40 (reduces to 30 if company hits targets & half of investment is paid back)	Energy-efficient dome-shaped buildings and garden structures	Theo Paphitis	Failed (Note: EcoHab Homes and O-Pod Buildings never received the dragons investment and dissolved in 2012.)		Dissolved (2012)
Episode 9	26 September 2011	Andrea McDowall and Rebecca Baldwin	Shoot It Yourself	60,000	26	Professional video hiring and editing business	Hilary Devey	Failed (Note: Shoot It Yourself's investment talks were discontinued following filming, after Hilary Devey increased her offer to 40%. Dissolved by 2023.)		Dissolved (2023)
Episode 10	3 October 2011	Helen Waterston	Innovative Gadgets Ltd (Roastcosy)	70,000	48	Stainless steel chain mail covering for roasting meats	Peter Jones and Deborah Meaden	Failed (Note: Roastcosy's investment was never completed. A publicised investigation by the Advertising Standards Authority on the company's products may have impacted on the deal. Company was dissolved by 2017.)		Dissolved (2017)

=== Series 10 ===
Episode	First aired	Entrepreneur(s)	Company or product name	Money requested (£)	Equity Given %	Description of product	Investing Dragon(s)	Result After Filming	Website	Fate
Episode 1	9 September 2012	Bee London	Weave Got Style	85,000	40	Hair extensions	Hilary Devey	Failed (Note: Weave Got Style's investment never happened and the company has since dissolved.)		Dissolved (2018)
Episode 1	9 September 2012	Lewis Blitz, James Gold and Richard Gold	Skinny Dip	120,000	30 (25% when investment repaid)	Fashion technology accessories	Peter Jones	Failed (Note: Skinny Dip decided against the investment after filming and reinvested the company's profits back into the business. Company has continued to trade successfully.)		Active
Episode 2	16 September 2012	Geoff and Collette Bell	Shampooheads	75,000	20	Children's haircare brand	Theo Paphitis and Hilary Devey	Signed (Note: Shampooheads investment was completed, however the company has ceased trading as of 2018.)		Dissolved (2018)
Episode 3	23 September 2012	Helen and Lisa Tse	Sweet Mandarin	50,000	40	Oriental dipping sauces	Hilary Devey and Duncan Bannatyne	Failed (Note: Sweet Mandarin's investment never went through. Dissolved in 2019.)		Dissolved (2019)
Episode 3	23 September 2012	Kellie Forbes and Gill Hayward	YUUbag	60,000	30	Children's backpack and accessories range	Peter Jones and Deborah Meaden	Signed		Dissolved (2021)
Episode 4	30 September 2012	Harrison Woods	Primal Parking	60,000	40	Car parking space lettings agency	Peter Jones and Theo Paphitis	Failed (Note: Primal Parking declined the investment after filming, although Peter Jones and Theo Paphitis continued in advisory roles. Company was sold to a private investor in 2013.)	https://web.archive.org/web/20121003001328/http://www.primalparking.co.uk/]	Sold (2013)
Episode 5	7 October 2012	Kiryl Chykeyuk and Art Stavenka	Old Bond (later renamed as Kino-mo and HyperByn)	90,000	40	Spinning, animated advertisement on bicycle wheels	Deborah Meaden and Theo Paphitis	Failed (Note: Old Bond's investment did not go through. Company has since been rebranded twice as Kino-mo and then as HyperByn, remaining active on companies house.)		Active
Episode 5	7 October 2012	Dupsy Abiola	Intern Avenue	100,000	40 (30% if targets are hit)	Online internship directory	Peter Jones	Signed (Note: Intern Avenue's investment was reported to have been completed and later bought out by a variety of shareholders, however the company was dissolved in 2019.)		Dissolved (2019)
Episode 6	14 October 2012	Marie Sawle	Billy + Margot	60,000	40	Ice cream for dogs	Deborah Meaden	Signed		Dissolved (2022)
Episode 6	14 October 2012	Henry and Philip Blake	WoodBlocX	75,000	25 (15% as soon as investment is repaid)	Outdoor wooden DIY landscaping product	Peter Jones	Signed		Active
Episode 7	21 October 2012	Umer Ashraf	iCafe	80,000	49	Coffee shop business and franchise	Duncan Bannatyne	Failed (Note: iCafe completed due diligence however the deal was never finalised.)		Active
Episode 7	21 October 2012	Ben Hardyment	Zapper	250,000	30	Website which buys iPhones, iPads, electronics, books, CDs, DVDs and games for cash	Theo Paphitis	Failed (Note: Zapper's investment did not complete. Remains active.)		Active
Episode 8	28 October 2012	Paul Turner	A Turner & Sons Sausage Ltd	80,000	33⅓	Sausage manufacturing company	Peter Jones	Signed		Active
Episode 9	11 November 2012	Ashley Sayed	Karuma Innovations	150,000	25	Child-friendly tablet retail company	Peter Jones	Failed (Note: Karuma Innovations investment did not complete. The deal was subject to review after 12 months, only progressing if successful. Company no longer trades the device pitched in the den and has since been redeveloped into a consultancy business. Dissolved by 2014.)		Dissolved (2014)
Episode 9	11 November 2012	Anne and Keith Proctor	Pro-Tec Covers	75,000	26	Caravan and motor home fabric covers	Hilary Devey and Duncan Bannatyne	Failed (Note: Pro-Tec Covers's investment did not complete. Remains active.)		Active
Episode 10	18 November 2012	Mark Richardson	Bionic Glove Technology Europe Ltd	100,000	40	Ergonomic, durable, patented gloves for golfing, gardening and gym use	Deborah Meaden and Theo Paphitis	Failed (Note: Bionic Glove's investment did not complete. Remains active.)		Active
Episode 11	25 November 2012	Mark Ferguson and Emma Jones	myBunjee	70,000	35	Mobile phone case attachment to prevent phone from falling on the floor	Peter Jones	Signed		Active
Episode 11	25 November 2012	Luke Booth and Christopher Eves	P4CK	50,000	30	Product design business, including two products related to carrying of takeaway food and drink, and beer cups	Theo Paphitis	Failed (Note: P4CK's investment was not completed, and was instead sold to Delta Packaging Ltd.)		Sold
Episode 12	2 December 2012	Naomi Kibble and Helen McAvoy	Rocktails	80,000	40 (30% when annual profits show £500,000.)	Frozen cocktails	Peter Jones and Duncan Bannatyne	Failed (Note: Rocktails declined the investment after filming, believing that Bannatyne and Jones undervalued the company. Company was dissolved in 2015.)		Dissolved (2015)
Episode 12	2 December 2012	John Spence	Megaflatables	37,500 (received 40,000)	25	Large inflatables used for advertising brands and products	Peter Jones	Failed (Note: Megaflatables investment did not complete. Remains active.)		Active
Christmas Special	27 December 2012	Allison Whitmarsh	ProperMaid	50,000	25	Homemade cakes with a twist	Deborah Meaden	Signed		Dissolved (2019)

== Rejected offers ==
=== Series 1 ===
Episode	First aired	Entrepreneur(s)	Company or product name	Money offered (£)	Equity offered %	Description of product	Proposed Dragon(s)	Website	Fate
Episode 5	1 February 2005	Jo Gascoigne	A-Frame Golf	125,000	26.3	Lighter and cheaper golf bag	Peter Jones (Note: A-Frame Golf declined the offer of investment, deeming the equity requested by the dragon being too high.)	N/A	Dissolved (2008)

=== Series 2 ===
Episode	First aired	Entrepreneur(s)	Company or product name	Money offered (£)	Equity offered %	Description of product	Proposed Dragon(s)	Website	Fate
Episode 1	15 November 2005	Stefano Matheou	RakaStaka	100,000	20	Stacking units for beer bottles in fridges	Rachel Elnaugh and Theo Paphitis (Note: RakaStaka declined the offer deeming the equity requested to be too high. Remains active.)		Active
Episode 2	22 November 2005	Jay Cousins	Orikaso (Flatwork UK)	100,000	40 / 50	Foldable food and cooking accessories	Rachel Elnaugh and Theo Paphitis (Note: Orikaso declined the offer of investment deeming the equity requested by dragons to be too high. Company was dissolved by 2008.)		Dissolved (2008)
Episode 3	29 November 2005	William Berry	Accommodation for Students	150,000	50	Website for students accommodation	Theo Paphitis and Doug Richard (Note: Accommodation for Students' declined the offer of investment deeming the equity requested by dragons to be too high. Remains active.)		Active
Episode 4	6 December 2005	Peter Brewin and William Crawford	Concrete Canvas	80,000	50	Emergency shelter design concept	Doug Richard and Theo Paphitis (Note: Concrete Canvas declined the offer deeming the equity requested to be too high. Remains active.)		Active

=== Series 3 ===
Episode	First aired	Entrepreneur(s)	Company or product name	Money offered (£)	Equity offered %	Description of product	Proposed Dragon(s)	Website	Fate
Episode 1	3 August 2006	James Barnham and Ian Sillett	NovaFlo	150,000	10	Water-overflow protection device	Duncan Bannatyne, Richard Farleigh and Theo Paphitis (Note: NovaFlo declined the offer of investment deeming the equity requested by the dragons being too high. Company is still in operations as of Sep 2022.)		Sold (2017)
Episode 2	10 August 2006	Asli Bohane	Empty Me	50,000	51	Foldable picnic bag and mat	Deborah Meaden (Note: Empty Me declined the offer of investment as Bohane was unwilling to lose a controlling interest in the business. Company was dissolved by 2019.)	N/A	Dissolved (2019)
Episode 4	24 August 2006	Fenella Lindsell and Lara Goodbody	Yogabugs	250,000	30	Children's yoga and mindfulness activity	Peter Jones, Richard Farleigh and Theo Pathitis (Note: Yogabuddies declined the offer of investment deeming the equity requested by the dragons being too high. Company was dissolved in 2017.)		Dissolved (2017)
Episode 5	31 August 2006	Tamlyn Thompson	ID Scan Biometrics	250,000	50	Identity document scanning and storage	Richard Farleigh (Note: ID Scan Biometrics declined Farleigh's offer of investment, appearing uncomfortable with the amount of equity requested. Company was sold in 2016 to GB Group Plc for £37 million with an additional £8 million in incentives.)		Sold (2016)
Episode 6	7 September 2006	John Mooney and Andy O'Reilly	Caddy Motion	250,000	50	Portable charging device for batteries for golf buggies	Peter Jones and Richard Farleigh (Note: Caddy Motion declined the offer of investment deeming the equity requested by the dragons being too high. Company was dissolved by 2011.)		Dissolved (2011)
Episode 7	14 September 2006	Rachel Price	Garden Gopher	150,000	50	Trolley for gardeners holding tools and waste up to 50lbs	Richard Farleigh (Note: Garden Gopher declined the offer of investment deeming the equity requested by Farleigh to be too high. Company was dissolved by 2009.)	N/A	Dissolved (2009)
Episode 8	21 September 2006	Rob Law	Trunki	150,000	50	Luggage suitcase for children	Richard Farleigh (Note: Trunki declined the offer of investment deeming the equity requested by Farleigh to be too high, citing the offer to be based on Paphitis's aggressive behavior with the prototype resulting in physical damage and indicating safety concerns. Duncan Bannatyne has since stated his regret in not investing, citing the product's eventual success. Company sold by 2023.)		Sold (2023)

=== Series 4 ===
Episode	First aired	Entrepreneur(s)	Company or product name	Money offered (£)	Equity offered %	Description of product	Proposed Dragon(s)	Website	Fate
Episode 2	14 February 2007	Ling Valentine	Lings Cars	50,000	30	Website for car rentals	Duncan Bannatyne and Richard Farleigh (Note: Lings Cars declined the offer of investment deeming the equity requested by the dragons to be too high. Remains active.)		Active
Episode 5	7 March 2007	Richard Williamson	EDV Videos	250,000	25	Video production service turning home videos into biopics	Deborah Meaden and Richard Farleigh (Note: EDV Videos declined the offer of investment deeming the equity requested by the dragons to be too high.)	N/A	N/A
Episode 6	21 March 2007	Andrew Reeves and Dave Thomas	Isis Adventure Series	200,000	50	Adult adventure puzzles and treasure hunts leading to cash rewards	Peter Jones and Theo Paphitis (Note: Isis Adventure Series' declined the offer of investment citing the equity requested to be too high and the dragons initial feedback that high sales indicated that an investment was not necessary, recommending they take out a bank loan. Remains active.)		Active

=== Series 5 ===
Episode	First aired	Entrepreneur(s)	Company or product name	Money offered (£)	Equity offered %	Description of product	Proposed Dragon(s)	Website	Fate
Episode 3	29 October 2007	Helen Wooldridge and Polly Marsh	Cuddledry	100,000	45 / 40	Hooded towel aid for bathing babies	Deborah Meaden and James Caan (Note: Cuddledry declined the offers of investment deeming the equity requested by the dragons to be too high. Remains active.)		Active

=== Series 6 ===
Episode	First aired	Entrepreneur(s)	Company or product name	Money offered (£)	Equity offered %	Description of product	Proposed Dragon(s)	Website	Fate
Episode 2	28 July 2008	Clive Billing	Diamond Geezer	255,000	40	Online jewellery retailer	Peter Jones, Theo Paphitis and James Caan (Note: Diamond Geezer declined the offer of investment deeming the equity requested by the dragons to be too high. Remains active.)	Active	
Episode 8	8 September 2008	Andy Hurwitz and Naomi Timperley	Baby Loves Disco	100,000	40	Organised children's party planning	Deborah Meaden (Note: Andy Hurwitz declined the offer of investment citing the equity requested to be too high, although he did so with consulting Naomi Timperley. Company was dissolved by 2013.)		Dissolved (2013)

=== Series 7 ===
Episode	First aired	Entrepreneur(s)	Company or product name	Money offered (£)	Equity offered %	Description of product	Proposed Dragon(s)	Website	Fate
Episode 1	15 July 2009	Eddie Middleton	Westhawk	255,000	48	Carbon fibre electric patio heaters	Peter Jones and James Caan (Note: Westhawk's rejected the offer of investment deeming the equity requested by the dragons to be too high, whilst Middleton's attitude towards discussing his numbers causing frustration with the dragons. Company was dissolved by 2014.)	N/A	Dissolved (2014)
Episode 5	12 August 2009	Paul Ward	Paragon Pe Ltd	100,000	30 (reduces to 10% over 2 years)	Non-bio laundry detergent for MRSA and C. difficile	James Caan (Note: Paragon Pe's rejected the offer of investment citing he already had a healthy net profit and would not negotiate more than the 5% offered. Remains active.)	N/A	Active
Episode 6	19 August 2009	Ronan McCarthy	The Spit 'n' Polish Shoeshine Company	108,000	40	Multimedia advertising shoe shining service booths	James Caan (Note: The Spit 'n' Polish Shoeshine Company rejected the offer of investment deeming the equity requested by Caan to be too high. Remains active.)	N/A	Active

=== Series 9 ===
Episode	First aired	Entrepreneur(s)	Company or product name	Money offered (£)	Equity offered %	Description of product	Proposed Dragon(s)	Website	Fate
Episode 3	14 August 2011	Jim and Richard George	Postsaver	160,000	35 / 30	Protection for fence posts	Deborah Meaden, Duncan Bannatyne, Theo Paphitis and Hilary Devey (Note: Postsaver declined the offer of investment, refusing to give away more than 25%. Remains active.)		Active

=== Series 10 ===
Episode	First aired	Entrepreneur(s)	Company or product name	Money offered (£)	Equity offered %	Description of product	Proposed Dragon(s)	Website	Fate
Episode 4	30 September 2012	Michael and Joe Smith	Wheelbarrow Booster	50,000	50	Wheelbarrow accessories	Duncan Bannatyne and Hilary Devey (Note: Michael and Joe Smith declined the offer, believing they did not need the dragons help following the pitch. They went on to raise the funds without investment and have since seen profits grow in excess of £1.3m since the episodes broadcast. Remains active.)	N/A	Active
Episode 6	14 October 2012	Dustin Toland	Gigwam	100,000	45	Tent system for outdoor events	Theo Paphitis and Deborah Meaden (Note: Gigwam declined the offer of investment deeming the equity requested by the dragons to be too high. Dissolved by 2021.)		Dissolved (2021)
Episode 8	28 October 2012	Dr Caroline Howard, Chris Kurt-Gabel and Lee Jason Taylor	A to E Training & Solutions Ltd	50,000	32	Resuscitation and life support business	Duncan Bannatyne (Note: A to E Training declined the offer of investment deeming the equity requested by Bannatyne to be too high. Remains active.)		Active
Episode 8	28 October 2012	Karina Oldale	Envirothaw	115,000	50	Granular and fluid de-icer	Theo Paphitis (Note: Envirothaw declined the offer of investment deeming the equity requested by Paphitis to be too high. Company was dissolved by 2014.)	N/A	Dissolved (2014)

== Failed pitches ==
=== Series 1 ===
Episode	First aired	Entrepreneur(s)	Company or product name	Money requested (£)	Equity offered (%)	Description of product	dragons reaction	Website	Fate
Episode 1	4 January 2005	Graham Whitby and Barry Haigh	Baby Dream Machine	150,000	5	Aid for rocking baby cots	Baby Dream Machine's pitch failed due to the dragons' concerns over the company's valuation. Remains active.		Active
Episode 1	4 January 2005	Gavin Drake	Art Out There	100,000	49	An annual arts and music, outdoor weekend event	Gavin Drake's pitch failed due to the dragons' concerns over the terms of the company's order's not meeting their requirements.	N/A	N/A
Episode 1	4 January 2005	Paul Clark	Incarnation	N/A	N/A	Disney themed car styling	Paul Clark's pitch failed as the dragons were not convinced of the idea. Terms not broadcast.	N/A	N/A
Episode 1	4 January 2005	Mubbasher Khanzada	Welltime Ltd	N/A	N/A	Software and IT development consultancy	Welltime Ltd's pitch was stated as failed, however no dragon feedback, terms of equity or money requested were broadcast. Remains active.		Active
Episode 1	4 January 2005	Ian McCormack	Stubbi and Co Ltd	N/A	N/A	Cigarette stub pouches	Ian McCormack's pitch failed as the dragons felt the product raised concerns over encouraging smoking. Terms not broadcast. Dissolved by 2015.	N/A	Dissolved (2015)
Episode 1	4 January 2005	Joanne Morrison and Emma McPherson	Em and Jo Ltd	60,000	20	Womenswear, fashion and accessories	Em and Jo's pitch failed, despite Bannatyne offering part of the investment, as the other dragons felt the entrepreneurs overvalued the company.	N/A	N/A
Episode 1	4 January 2005	Jeremy Davis	Ethical Clothing Range	N/A	N/A	Ethical clothing fashion range	Jeremy Davis's pitch failed as the dragons were not impressed with the presentation of the designs displayed. Terms not broadcast.	N/A	N/A
Episode 1	4 January 2005	Yul Thompson	Golf Advertising Ltd	N/A	N/A	Golf advertising in driving range bays	Golf Advertising's pitch failed as the dragons believed Thompson to be condescending. Terms not broadcast.	N/A	N/A
Episode 1	4 January 2005	Rachel Fiddes	Blow Dry Bar	60,000	N/A	Hairdressing salon offering blow-dry services	Rachel Fiddes's pitch failed as the dragons felt the company's business model and name to be unattractive. Terms of equity not broadcast.	N/A	N/A
Episode 2	11 January 2005	Andrew Gordon	Stable Table	87,000	33	Device designed to stabilise unbalanced tables	Andrew Gordon's pitch failed as the dragons felt Gordon's expected sales would not return their investment. Company later gained distribution in America and remains active in Sweden.		Active
Episode 2	11 January 2005	Gillian Kavannagh	Mandala Aroma	50,000	10	Organic aromatherapy skin products	Gillian Kavannagh's pitch failed as the dragons felt the market was already saturated with the product and cited nothing displayed in the episode had the company logo embedded. Dissolved by 2010.		Dissolved (2010)
Episode 2	11 January 2005	Simon Scott	Kestrel Aerospace PAV	150,000	15	One person air vehicle using a ducted fan propulsion system	Simon Scott's pitch failed due to the dragons' belief that he had not invested enough capital to make an investment worthwhile and his refusal to share the details of his patent. Dissolved by 2007.		Dissolved (2007)
Episode 2	11 January 2005	Lyn Harlow	All of a Quiver	N/A	N/A	Hands free holder for carrying flowers	Lyn Harlow's pitch failed as the dragons' belief that the product did not solve any issues and general distaste for the design. Dissolved by 2007.	N/A	Dissolved (2007)
Episode 2	11 January 2005	Justin Gabriel	Project Y	N/A	N/A	Fair trade organic fast-food outlets	Justin Gabriel's pitch failed due to Gabriel stating he would not guarantee the business model that everything would be fair trade and organic. Terms not broadcast. Remains active.	N/A	Active
Episode 2	11 January 2005	Nigel Williams	Laser DIY	N/A	N/A	Laser operated spirit level	Laser DIY's pitch failed due to the dragons' belief that the product did not distinguish itself from a standard spirit level. Terms not broadcast.	N/A	N/A
Episode 2	11 January 2005	Marianne Jones	Pure Bake	N/A	N/A	Additive-free baking powders	Pure Bake's pitch failed due to the dragons' belief that the product lacked a unique selling point and were generally unimpressed with the taste. Dissolved by 2013.	N/A	Dissolved (2013)
Episode 2	11 January 2005	John Dibden	Dog & Duck Ale	N/A	N/A	Ale beer cartons	Dog & Duck Ale's pitch failed due to the dragons citing Dribden did not own the beer nor the packaging and their distaste for the carton. Terms not broadcast.	N/A	N/A
Episode 2	11 January 2005	Hywel Edwards and Alison Morgan	Migra Cap	N/A	N/A	Headband for migraines relief	Migra Cap's pitch failed due to dragons' concerns over the business plan and the duo's ability to cope in running the company. Terms not broadcast. Dissolved by 2014.		Dissolved (2014)
Episode 2	11 January 2005	Richard Croft and Chris Thompson	Music Control (Emusu)	200,000	25	Website launches for independent music artists	Music Control's pitch failed as the dragons cited the software was owned by a third party and felt both lacked the business experience to run the company. Dissolved by 2014.		Active
Episode 3	18 January 2005	James Brown	Care Free House	80,000	8	Castle restorations	James Brown's pitch failed due to the dragons' concern over Brown's ability to complete such vast restorations. Remains active.	N/A	Active
Episode 3	18 January 2005	Esme Eretkin	Esme Ertekin Shoe Club	N/A	N/A	Over 40s Fashion Range	Esme Eretkin's pitch failed following the dragons criticism of her business plan and poorly presented pitch. Terms not broadcast. She continues as self-employed and has since featured her designs in retailers across the world.	N/A	Active
Episode 3	18 January 2005	Chad Townsend	Webbed Paddles	N/A	N/A	Canoe paddling tool	Chad Townsend's pitch failed, however no dragon feedback, terms of equity or money requested were broadcast. Company continues to trade in Canada through Facebook.		Active
Episode 3	18 January 2005	David Hancock	For Arts Sake	N/A	N/A	Self designed artwork	David Hancock's pitch failed due to the dragons not seeing his artwork as a sustainable business. Terms not broadcast.		Active
Episode 3	18 January 2005	Gayle Blanchflower	Outabox Ltd	125,000	5	Disposable outdoor leisure furniture	Gayle Blanchflower's pitch failed as the dragons felt the product's fabrication was unfit for the outdoors and found Gayle's attitude off-putting for investment. Dissolved by 2009.		Dissolved (2009)
Episode 3	18 January 2005	Kevin Sampson	Awaydays	100,000	N/A	Funding for a film project	Awayday's pitch failed as the dragons felt Sampson would not return the investment in a reasonable timeframe whilst also suggesting the show's format was not fit for such an investment. The proposed equity returns were not broadcast. The film was released in 2009 grossing $131,265 at the box office.		Released (2009)
Episode 3	18 January 2005	Jeffery Wheeler	Sweetspot	80,000	N/A	Latex accessory for football boots	Sweetspot's pitch failed as the dragons felt the product was too easily replicated. The proposed equity returns were not broadcast. Dissolved by 2008.	N/A	Dissolved (2008)
Episode 3	18 January 2005	Suzanne Longworth	Curiosities for Kids	N/A	N/A	Children's toys for travel	Curiosities for Kids's pitch failed due to the dragons citing the product had no unique features. Terms not broadcast. Dissolved by 2006.	N/A	Dissolved (2006)
Episode 4	25 January 2005	David Tully	Maxi Mat	50,000	10	Odour absorbing mat	Maxi Mat's pitch failed due to the dragons not believing the market to be wide enough for investment. Dissolved by 2008.	N/A	Dissolved (2008)
Episode 4	25 January 2005	Barbara-Simpson and Richard Birks	Tattoo Erase	250,000	10	Tattoo removal service	Tattoo Erase's pitch failed, despite Simon Woodroofe offering part of the investment, due to the other dragons citing they did not fully own the patent to the liquids used, lack of clarity over which part of the company they were investing in, and were overall dissatisfied with the company's revenue. Dissolved by 2013.	N/A	Dissolved (2013)
Episode 4	25 January 2005	Natasha Mason	Tasty Aprons	N/A	N/A	Kitchen fashion aprons	Tasty Apron's pitch failed due to the dragons perceiving the pitch as a gimmick and doubt of Mason's business acumen. Terms not broadcast.	N/A	N/A
Episode 4	25 January 2005	Younis Ali	Halal Cuisines	N/A	N/A	Halal based convenience food	Halal Cuisines's pitch failed due to the dragons citing Ali's focus to be on taste as opposed to halal sources. Terms not broadcast. Dissolved by 2006.	N/A	Dissolved (2013)
Episode 4	25 January 2005	Petra and Gordon Wetzel-Stewert	West Brewing Company (renamed West Beer)	N/A	N/A	Glasgow beer brewing	West Brewing Company's pitch failed due to the dragons citing they had no prior experience of working in the industry and struggled to explain their finances. Terms not broadcast. Company has since been renamed and remains active.		Active
Episode 4	25 January 2005	Rachel Lowe	Destination London	75,000	30	Taxi themed board game	Destination London's pitch failed due Lowe's struggle in answering many of dragons questions on the size of the market and knowing her finances. Destination went on to gross over £2 million by 2007 and remains one of the most successful companies to be declined by the dragons. Company was sold in 2010.		Sold (2010)
Episode 4	25 January 2005	Stewart Twinn	ByoBin	N/A	N/A	Waste storage with protection from odour	ByoBin's pitch failed due to the dragons' belief that the bin did not prevent the smell of waste as Twinn had pitched. Terms not broadcast. Dissolved by 2014.	N/A	Dissolved (2014)
Episode 4	25 January 2005	Jenny & Bill Conway	Dragons Cars	N/A	N/A	Racing car designed for public roads	Coffman Racing's pitch failed as the dragons did not believe the company was yet big enough to see a return on investment. Terms not broadcast. Company was later incorporated into Coffman Racing LLC.		Sold (2014)
Episode 4	25 January 2005	Shaun Costello	Karaoke Machine	N/A	N/A	Karaoke machine recording vocals and video	Karaoke Machine's pitch failed as the dragons were not convinced of Costello launching multiple businesses at once. Terms not broadcast.	N/A	N/A
Episode 5	1 February 2005	Dr John Garside	Slim PC	190,000	25	Computer manufactured with wood as opposed to plastic	Slim PC's pitch failed due to the dragons' belief that the product lacked unique features compared to products already on the market and general distaste for the design. Dissolved by 2010.		Dissolved (2010)
Episode 5	1 February 2005	Ade Andu	Plant Pal	100,000	25	Self-watering systems for plants	Plant Pal's pitch failed due to Andu's refusal to share equity outside of the company's interests in Europe and the United Kingdom. Remains active.		Active
Episode 5	1 February 2005	Floyd Peltier	Travelseal	N/A	N/A	Security labels for travel luggage	Travelseal's pitch failed due to the dragons citing that many airports advise travellers not to lock their luggage due to security checks, whilst also criticising the product for simply being a piece of tape. Terms not broadcast. Dissolved by 2024.	N/A	Dissolved (2024)
Episode 5	1 February 2005	Joanne Bradford	Holi-Doze	N/A	N/A	Inflatable travel cot for babies	Holi-Doze's pitch failed due to the dragons' concerns that Bradford was not capable of running the business and did not understand the market. Dissolved by 2010.		Dissolved (2010)
Episode 5	1 February 2005	Anthony Johnson	Profiles Systems	N/A	N/A	Non-surgical facelifts	Profiles Systems's pitch failed due to the dragons' belief that the product's shelf life would be short. Terms not broadcast.	N/A	N/A
Episode 5	1 February 2005	Jane Dorey	Bathrobics	N/A	N/A	Exercises performed in a bath	Bathrobics' pitch failed due to the dragons' concerns that Dorey lacked the business acumen required to run the company. Terms not broadcast. Dissolved by 2008.		Dissolved (2008)
Episode 5	1 February 2005	Dr Kim Can (Anthony Kim)	Secured Sound	N/A	N/A	Card reminder for doctors appointments	Secured Sound's pitch failed due to the dragons' concerns that the product had functionality problems in battery life and ease of switching off. Terms not broadcast. Dissolved by 2016.	N/A	Dissolved (2016)
Episode 5	1 February 2005	Yinka Davies	Rayink Limited	N/A	N/A	Canopy for pushing prams	Rayink Limited's pitch failed due to the dragons' disbelief that the product would sell. Terms not broadcast. Dissolved by 2011.		Dissolved (2011)
Episode 6	8 February 2005	Mark Greenhalgh	Cabtivate Media Ltd	100,000	10	Advertising and entertainment television service for taxis	Cabtivate's pitch failed due to the dragons citing the product was already losing too much money to consider investment. Company was dissolved in 2010.		Dissolved (2010)
Episode 6	8 February 2005	Rory Orr	EM Medical	N/A	N/A	Aid for musical spains and muscle aches	EM Medical's pitch failed due to the dragons' concerns that the product was unattractive and were generally unimpressed with Orr's business model. Company was dissolved in 2010.	N/A	Dissolved (2010)
Episode 6	8 February 2005	Fenner Austen	Dinnerpoint.com	N/A	N/A	Dinner dating agency	Dinnerpoint.com's pitch failed due to the dragons' concern over Austen's business model of users advertising themselves as 'lonely' whilst also citing his negligence of the company being a dating agency as opposed to a networking hub. Terms not broadcast. Dissolved by 2008.		Dissolved (2008)
Episode 6	8 February 2005	Simon Gasgoyne and Nigel Williams	TechnoDeck	N/A	N/A	Wheel ramps made from recycled tyres	TechnoDeck's pitch failed due to the dragons' concerns over the company's ability to produce the amount of stock pitched. Terms not broadcast. Dissolved by 2007.		Dissolved (2007)
Episode 6	8 February 2005	Stephen Mallet	In-velope	150,000	10	Multi-purpose storage solution	In-velope's pitch failed due to the dragons citation that Mallet did not own the company and felt the lack of sales left the valuation too high. Dissolved by 2015.		Dissolved (2015)
Episode 6	8 February 2005	Ayesha Broadbent	Grid 108	N/A	N/A	Website creating 3D maps of cities for use as search engines	3D Mapping's pitch failed due to the dragons' belief that Broadbent did not present a viable business model. Terms not broadcast. Dissolved by 2005.		Dissolved (2005)
Episode 6	8 February 2005	Paula Ward	Comatel	N/A	N/A	Temporary repair for leaking water pipes	Comatel's pitch failed due to the dragons' concerns that Ward was not fully focussed on the business and had no previous experience of being an inventor. Terms not broadcast. Dissolved by 2014.	N/A	Dissolved (2014)
Episode 6	8 February 2005	David Daly	Toilet Snake	25,000	N/A	Toilet cleaning accessory	Toilet Snake's pitch failed due to the dragons citing the product was not patented. Terms of equity not broadcast. Daly later appeared in the inaugural season of Dragon's Den Ireland and received an investment of €25,000.	N/A	N/A

=== Series 2 ===
Episode	First aired	Entrepreneur(s)	Company or product name	Money requested (£)	Equity offered (%)	Description of product	dragons reaction	Website	Fate
Episode 1	15 November 2005	Alex Hall	The Big O	150,000	15	Pre-packed marinated olive selection	The Big O's pitch failed due to the dragons' concern over the lack of sales and Hall's general attitude. Dissolved by 2011.	N/A	Dissolved (2011)
Episode 1	15 November 2005	Phil Gold	The Magic Roundabout	N/A	N/A	Packages of children's sweets and toys	Kone Zone's pitch failed due to the dragons citing a lack of unique selling points and patent protection. Terms not broadcast. Dissolved by 2009.	N/A	Dissolved (2009)
Episode 1	15 November 2005	Nick Nobel	Dust Bubble	N/A	N/A	Cleaning agent for drills	Dust Bubble's pitch failed due to the dragons citing Nobel could not calculate his forecasts and concerns that he was not able to run the business. Terms not broadcast. Dissolved by 2018.		Dissolved (2018)
Episode 1	15 November 2005	Stipan Saulich	Super Knees	N/A	N/A	Strap on roller skates easing knee strain	Super Knees's pitch failed due to the dragons' belief that the product would not appeal to a wide market. Terms not broadcast. The BBC later received criticism for the broadcast of the dragons treatment of Saulich and his own description of the product not being shown. Press reports indicated the product had some success in Europe for a time. Company was dissolved in 2006.		Dissolved (2006)
Episode 1	15 November 2005	Teresa Strong	LippiStix	N/A	N/A	Small brush designed to fit into all brands of lipstick tubes	LippiStix's pitch failed due to the dragons' dislike of the concept. Terms not broadcast. Company was dissolved in 2007.		Dissolved (2007)
Episode 1	15 November 2005	Claire Locke	Smarty Pants	150,000	25	Underwear with personalised names	Smarty Pants's pitch failed due to the dragons' concern over her previous struggles to fund and run the business. Remains active.		Active
Episode 1	15 November 2005	Kendra Torgan	F8 Clothing	145,000	N/A	Fleece clothing accessories	F8 Clothing's pitch failed due to the dragons citing Torgan was unaware of where her previous funding had been spent whilst voicing concerns that she seemed focussed on selling to celebrities. Terms of equity not broadcast. Dissolved by 2013.		Dissolved (2013)
Episode 1	15 November 2005	Daniel Parker	Make Up School	N/A	N/A	School for make-up artists	Daniel Parker's pitch failed due to the dragons citing Parker had no experience in the field and nor business acumen. Terms not broadcast.	N/A	N/A
Episode 1	15 November 2005	Andy Bush	Star Trek Pyjamas	N/A	N/A	Star Trek themed nightwear for adults	Star Trek Pyjamas's pitch failed due to the dragons not seeing a sizable gap in the market for adults. Terms of equity not broadcast.	N/A	N/A
Episode 2	22 November 2005	Amanda Zuydervelt	Style Bible	250,000	25	Online travel destination recommendations	Style Bible's pitch failed due to the dragons' concerns over how much funding Zuydervelt actually required whilst citing the current ease of finding destinations on the internet. Following filming, Zuydervelt voiced her distaste for Doug Richard's attitude during the pitch. Remains active.		Active
Episode 2	22 November 2005	Julie LeRoun	Sisserou	N/A	N/A	Liqueur made from rum and coconut	Sisserou's pitch failed due to the dragons' concerns over LeRoun's marketing strategy and competing in the size of the market. Terms not broadcast. Remains active.		Active
Episode 2	22 November 2005	Jay Cousins	Orikaso (Flatwork UK)	100,000	10	Foldable food and cooking accessories	Orikaso's pitch failed due to the dragons' concerns over Cousin's ambitious financial projections and subsequently ridiculed the valuation. Dissolved by 2008.		Dissolved (2008)
Episode 2	22 November 2005	Samantha Fountain	SheWee	N/A	N/A	Female toilet aid	SheWee's pitch failed due to the dragons' disbelief at Fountain's claim that 99% of women would purchase the item whilst also finding the pitch comical. Terms not broadcast. Remains active.		Active
Episode 2	22 November 2005	Prince Tikare	The Smoody Pod	N/A	N/A	Blender for smoothies	The Smoody Pod's pitch failed due to the dragons' concerns that Tikare had not done any market research whilst stating an overall dislike of the size and appearance of the product. Terms not broadcast. Remains active.		Active
Episode 2	22 November 2005	Steven Renwick	Tennis Is Mental	N/A	N/A	Psychology book for tennis players	Tennis Is Mental's pitch failed due to the dragons citing Renwick was only pitching a book as opposed to a business, recommending he source a publisher. Terms not broadcast.		Active
Episode 2	22 November 2005	David Wilkes	InterFlush	50,000	5	Device saving water usage on toilets	InterFlush's pitch failed due to the dragons' concerns that the process demonstrated was unattractive and Wilkes' inability to calculate his profit forecasts. Dissolved by 2016.		Dissolved (2016)
Episode 2	22 November 2005	Eretsu Sabrazi	Uzero	N/A	N/A	Sparkled female thong underwear	G-String's pitch failed due to the dragons' belief that the thong was overpriced and would quickly be out of fashion. Terms not broadcast.		N/A
Episode 2	22 November 2005	Sean McElherron	Canny Collar	N/A	N/A	Training lead for dogs	Canny Collar's pitch failed due to the dragons citing the product was already on the market via a major name and was no different. Terms not broadcast. Remains active.		Active
Episode 2	22 November 2005	Sarah Davis	Pole Dance Fitness	N/A	N/A	Pole dancing classes	Pole Dance Fitness' pitch failed due to the dragons general disinterest in the business model. Terms not broadcast. Company has previously received criticism from children's charity Childline, condemning Davis for teaching children.	N/A	N/A
Episode 3	29 November 2005	Dom Foulsham	Brand Theory	175,000	N/A	Storage for digital content	Brand Theory's pitch failed due to Foulsham's struggle to explain how the system operated. Terms of equity not broadcast. Dissolved by 2008.	N/A	Dissolved (2008)
Episode 3	29 November 2005	Bob Noburn	Ultrashave	150,000	N/A	Shaving cream made from exotic plant extracts and fruit oils	Ultrashave's pitch failed due to Noburn alleging that shaving manufacturers refuted the product as it improved the lifespan of razor blades and the dragons' concerns that noburn was overprotective of selling manufacturers the rights to the cream. Terms of equity not broadcast.		N/A
Episode 3	29 November 2005	Victoria Tringham	Pomelo	N/A	N/A	Female sandals range	Funky Flip Flops's pitch failed due to the dragons citing a high RRP and lacked a unique selling point. Dissolved by 2009.		Dissolved (2009)
Episode 3	29 November 2005	Wade Royd Taylor	Two Become One Jewellery	N/A	N/A	Avant-Garde jewellery range	Two Become One Jewellery's pitch failed due to the dragons' concerns that the designs were niche and not worthy of investment. Terms not broadcast. Remains active.		Active
Episode 3	29 November 2005	Will Downing	Pixi Lighter Holder	N/A	N/A	Holder for lighters on cigarette packets	Will Downing's pitch failed due to the dragons' concerns over investing in tobacco products whilst also ridiculing Downing's motive to donate 10% of his profits to a cancer charity. Terms not broadcast.	N/A	N/A
Episode 3	29 November 2005	Shaz Agar	Elite Sport	110,000	N/A	Protein nutritional supplements	Elite Sport's pitch failed due to the dragons citing Agar's reluctance to distribute outside his own company and felt Agar needed more than what he had pitched for. Terms of equity not broadcast.		N/A
Episode 3	29 November 2005	David Dunne & Mark Williams	Sea Scope	N/A	N/A	Jet boarding propelled surfboard	Jetski's pitch failed due to the dragons citing the product's negative feedback from the press and warnings issued on the product indicating the dangers of using the device. Terms not broadcast.	N/A	N/A
Episode 3	29 November 2005	Elimor Olisa & Isobel Beauchamp	DegreeArt (The JC Ltd)	50,000	N/A	Online art dealership	DegreeArt's pitch failed due to the dragons citing the duo were to use the investment for their own salaries. Terms of equity not broadcast. Dissolved by 2019.		Dissolved (2019)
Episode 3	29 November 2005	Kingsley Wright	Roton	N/A	N/A	Internal combustion aid for motors	Roton's pitch failed due to the dragons citing the product did not work. Terms not broadcast. Dissolved by 2011.		Dissolved (2011)
Episode 4	6 December 2005	David Mlynski	Yakibox	100,000	N/A	Japanese food ingredients and tools	Yakibox's pitch failed due to the dragons citing Mlynski did not own the rights to the product and his lack of knowledge on the market opportunities. Terms of equity not broadcast. Dissolved by 2012.		Dissolved (2012)
Episode 4	6 December 2005	Francesco Lia	Chocpix	N/A	N/A	Chocolates designed on photographs	Chocpix's pitch failed due to the dragons citing the chocolates were easily visible despite being marketed as only being visible in nightlight, as well as Lia's admission that only certain types of chocolate could be used. Terms not broadcast. Dissolved by 2008.		Dissolved (2008)
Episode 4	6 December 2005	Gary and Lindsay Shuttleworth	K92 Co	150,000	10	Aid for collecting animal waste	K92's pitch failed due to the dragons citing the Shuttleworth's lack of knowledge on devices already on the market and felt the products to be overpriced. Dissolved by 2012.	N/A	Dissolved (2012)
Episode 4	6 November 2005	Darren Bainbridge	Hip Clip	N/A	N/A	Holster for drinks	Hip Clip's pitch failed due to the dragons' belief that Bainbridge was unable to run the business and having a general dislike of the product. Terms not broadcast.	N/A	N/A
Episode 4	6 December 2005	Robin Harris	Reefski (Scuba Craft Ltd)	N/A	N/A	Submersible watercraft boat	Reefski's pitch failed due to the dragons citing a high RRP and concerns over safety usage. Terms not broadcast. Dissolved by 2010.		Dissolved (2010)
Episode 4	6 December 2005	Barbara Scott and Steve Atkinson	Circaroma	N/A	N/A	Organic oil skincare	Circaroma's pitch failed due to the dragons citing high net losses and a long repayment strategy for the investment. Terms not broadcast. Remains active.		Active
Episode 4	6 December 2005	Jonathan Astor	Ambient Allstars	100,000	15	Marketing agency	Ambient Media's pitch failed due to the dragons' belief that the business model was dated and citing Astor's attitude as irritating.		N/A
Episode 4	6 December 2005	Robert Bookham	Fresh Pasta	95,000	N/A	Range of fresh pasta dishes	Fresh Pasta's pitch failed due to the dragons citing the investment would be solely spent on just one piece of machinery and Bookham's desire for an investment to run the business. Terms of equity not broadcast.	N/A	N/A
Episode 4	6 December 2005	Helen and Lisa Tse	Sweet Mandarin	N/A	N/A	Chinese ready meals	Sweet Mandarin's pitch failed due to the dragons failing to see a major difference from supermarket standard quality. Helen and Lisa Tse appeared again in series 10 and secured investment from Hilary Devey and Duncan Bannatyne. Terms not broadcast. Dissolved by 2020.		Dissolved (2020)
Episode 4	6 December 2005	Larry Thompson and Ron Vigna	Anti-Piracy Invention	N/A	N/A	Piracy protection at cinemas	Anti-Piracy Invention's pitch failed due to the dragons' belief that cinemas already had technology to cite such activity. Terms not broadcast.	N/A	N/A
Episode 4	6 December 2005	Graham Whitby and Barry Haigh	Baby Dream Machine	250,000	10	Aid rocking cots and cribs	Baby Dream Machine's pitch failed due to the dragons' concerns over the company's valuation, despite Bannatyne offering part of the investment. Company was the first to appear twice on the show. It remains active.		Active
Episode 5	13 December 2005	Meenal Devani	Masti Games	70,000	N/A	Board game themed around bollywood	Masti Games' pitch failed due to the dragons citing Devani's pitch as too long and uninspiring, whilst also noting her failure to calculate her forecasts. Equity terms not broadcast. Dissolved by 2007.		Dissolved (2007)
Episode 5	13 December 2005	Edmund Green and Paul Ginns	Natural Burial	N/A	N/A	Environmentally friendly coffins and burials	Natural Burial's pitch failed due to the dragons citing low profit margins. Terms not broadcast. Remains active.		Active
Episode 5	13 December 2005	Caroline Wagstaff	Back Beauty (BackBliss)	N/A	N/A	Back lotion and cream applicators	Back Beauty 's pitch failed due to the dragons citing Wagstaff's admission she was not currently pitching the product to major retailers and alleged the request for investment was premature. Terms not broadcast. Remains active.		Active
Episode 5	13 December 2005	William Prophet	Prophet Designs Jewellery	N/A	N/A	Multi-functional sports jewellery	Prophet Designs Jewellery's pitch failed due to the dragons citing safety concerns of wearing the screw shaped necklace whilst playing sports and deemed the product unattractive. Terms not broadcast.	N/A	N/A
Episode 5	13 December 2005	Patrick Kelly	London Sport Magazine	N/A	N/A	Sports magazine advertising dates for events	London Sport Magazine's pitch failed due to Kelly's loss of composure in his pitch, failing to neither explain the product nor reveal profit margins. Terms not broadcast. Dissolved by 2018.		Dissolved (2018)
Episode 5	13 December 2005	Joe Solera	Light Bulb Changer	75,000	49	Retractable safety aid for changing light bulbs	Light Bulb Changer's pitch failed due to the dragons citing Solera could not demonstrate his knowledge of the market nor had a prototype to demonstrate. Remains active.	N/A	Dissolved (2023)
Episode 5	13 December 2005	Mark Strollery	Boste Water Lights	N/A	N/A	Lamps designed on the tranquillity of water	Boste Water Light's pitch failed due to the dragons' concerns over the size and appearance of the product, deeming it unattractive. Terms not broadcast. Dissolved by 2016.		Dissolved (2016)
Episode 5	13 December 2005	Peter Morrison and Sharon Hinds	TOR Sports Systems	N/A	N/A	Electronic target practice for football training	TOR Sports Systems's pitch failed due to the dragons citing no sales to date and concerns that the product would not sell. Terms not broadcast.	N/A	N/A
Episode 5	13 December 2005	Frank Hannigan	YouGetItBack	N/A	N/A	Sticky labels to prevent theft	YouGetItBack's pitch failed due to the dragons' concerns over the company offering rewards for found items, fearing the business model would lead to lost goods being held to ransom. Terms not broadcast. Dissolved by 2022.		Dissolved (2022)
Episode 5	13 December 2005	Thomas O'Connell	Atomic Toys (renamed Moby Bikes)	200,000	15	Bmx style bikes	Atomic Toys' pitch failed due to the dragons citing O'Connell's negligence of outgoing taxes and expenses as well as his refusal to negotiate from 15% equity. Remains active.		Active
Episode 6	20 December 2005	Dave Raewlinson	Personal Trainer	80,000	15	Device recording data from workouts into personal computers	Personal Trainer's pitch failed due to the dragons' concerns over connecting workout devices directly to computers to activate the device whilst also alleging the concept was not new and already in a failing market.	N/A	N/A
Episode 6	20 December 2005	Daniel Krywyj	Extreme Sports Cameras	N/A	N/A	Wireless camera for extreme sports	Extreme Sports Cameras' pitch failed due to the dragons citing Krywyj did not have and intellectual property on the product and feared a mass replication of the concept and design. Terms not broadcast. Dissolved by 2019.		Dissolved (2019)
Episode 6	20 December 2005	Dr Mike Caine	Respi Vest	100,000	20	Vest aiding breathing muscles	Respi Vest's pitch failed due to the dragons' belief that the vest misled people not to work out and concerns over Caine's focus on other projects. Remains active.		Active
Episode 6	20 December 2005	Alyn Thomas	Oxide Skateboards	75,000	N/A	Four wheeled skateboard	Off Road Skateboard's pitch failed due to the dragons citing Thomas's lack of market research. The terms of equity requested were not broadcast		N/A
Episode 6	20 December 2005	Chily Facher	Electronic Concierge	N/A	N/A	Electronic information pad for hotels	Electronic Concierge's pitch failed due to the dragons' belief that customers would prefer to talk to a human as opposed to a computer. Terms not broadcast.	N/A	N/A
Episode 6	20 December 2005	Craig Ian McAlpine	Res Ipsa Club	150,000	N/A	Private members club	Res Ipsa Club's pitch failed due to the dragons citing McAlpine's valuation as over inflated due to Bannatyne's admission that he was buying such businesses for a quarter of the valuation pitched. Terms of equity not broadcast.	N/A	N/A
Episode 6	20 December 2005	Marneta Viegas	Relax Kids	100,000	N/A	Children's fairy tales told as relaxing stories	Relax Kids' pitch failed due to the dragons citing Viegas was uncertain of how many orders she had received and lacked clarity on how she would use the investment. Terms of equity not broadcast. Remains active.		Active
Episode 6	20 December 2005	Grant Dench and George Payler	QeeZee Pads	N/A	N/A	Disposable sick bags with gel absorbing the waste	QeeZee Pads's pitch failed due to the dragons citing the size of the bag contrasted oral use. Terms not broadcast.	N/A	N/A
Episode 6	20 December 2005	Carlton Beckford	Phone Free Pages	200,000	N/A	Phone directory for freephone numbers	Carlton Beckford's pitch failed due to the dragons' belief that normal telephone numbers are preferred due to the likelihood of speaking directly to the business, whilst also citing concerns over the cost of mobi;e phone charges. Terms of equity not broadcast. Dissolved by 2010.		Dissolved (2010)
Episode 6	20 December 2005	Roger Bennett and Alan Scrace	Stereoscopic Image System	N/A	N/A	3D images camera	Roger Bennett and Alan Scrace's pitch failed due to the dragons citing his explanation of single use cameras to be overlong. Terms of equity not broadcast.	N/A	N/A

=== Series 3 ===
Episode	First aired	Entrepreneur(s)	Company or product name	Money requested (£)	Equity offered (%)	Description of product	dragons reaction	Website	Fate
Episode 1	3 August 2006	Nick Nethercott	Stealth Table	150,000	25	Multimedia entertainment table top	Stealth Table's pitch failed due to the dragons' concern over the lack of market for the product and how Nethercott had funded the business.	N/A	N/A
Episode 1	3 August 2006	Anneliese Pritchard	Nitty Gritty Ltd	N/A	N/A	Detailed entertainment styled maps for cities	Nitty Gritty's pitch failed due to the dragons stating their belief that the map was over-detailed and difficult to read. Terms not broadcast. Dissolved by 2018.		Dissolved (2018)
Episode 1	3 August 2006	Traci Curran and Fatima Saifee	Designer Dogwear	N/A	N/A	Detailed entertainment styled maps for cities	Designer Dogwear's pitch failed due to the dragons' concern that similar products were already on the market. Terms not broadcast.		N/A
Episode 1	3 August 2006	Manochehr Salek	Ecorider Ltd	50,000	N/A	Bio-diesel quad bike	Ecorider's pitch failed due to the dragons' concerns over the vehicle's low speed and design. Terms of equity not broadcast. Dissolved by 2013.		Dissolved (2013)
Episode 1	3 August 2006	Cecilia Morreau	Leaf Books	N/A	N/A	Short story books aimed for coffee shops	Leaf Books's pitch failed due to the dragons' concerns over the low sales of the books. Terms not broadcast. Dissolved by 2015.	N/A	Dissolved (2015)
Episode 1	3 August 2006	Jacquie Edwards	Totally Different	85,000	10	Disposable toilet seat covers	Totally Different's pitch failed due to the dragons' concern over the lack of copyright protection and issues over how to dispose of them. Dissolved by 2015.	N/A	Dissolved (2018)
Episode 1	3 August 2006	Jamie Allen and Simon Lee	Houdini The Musical	231,750	N/A	Theatrical musical of the life of Harry Houdini	Houdini The Musical's pitch failed due to the dragons' concern that Allen and Lee lacked experience in the field. Equity terms not broadcast. The production does not appear to have been released by either party since.	N/A	N/A
Episode 1	3 August 2006	Mike Daniels	Table Planner	N/A	N/A	Football themed table planning service	Table Planner's pitch failed due to the dragons citing that Daniel's plan displayed was inaccurate and were concerned over the high charge cost for the service. Terms not broadcast.	N/A	N/A
Episode 1	3 August 2006	Tina Johnson	Disc Drive	150,000	N/A	Software designed to teach drivers	Disc Drive's pitch failed due to the dragons believing the product was unappealing and not useful for drivers. Equity terms not broadcast.	N/A	N/A
Episode 2	10 August 2006	Lee Wood	Kardocktor	150,000	15	Premium rate helpline for motorists	Kardoctor's pitch failed due to the dragons citing the helpline simply referred people to local mechanics, did not clearly diagnose any particular issues and were overall unimpressed with his finances. Dissolved by 2012.		Dissolved (2012)
Episode 2	10 August 2006	Christine Clayton and Pauline Bacon	The Bonks	N/A	N/A	Figurines furniture items	The Bonks' pitch failed due to the dragons' disbelief that the product would reach a wide market and distaste for the name. Terms not broadcast.	N/A	N/A
Episode 2	10 August 2006	Nick Metcalf	Steak on the Stone	N/A	N/A	Stone hot-plate for cooking meat	Steak on the Stone's pitch failed due to the dragons citing Matcalf's lack of market research and concerns over the product's safety. Terms not broadcast. Remains active.		Active
Episode 2	10 August 2006	Marion Burns	Snip Snap	130,000	N/A	Children's hair-dressing franchise	Snip Snap's pitch failed due to the dragons' disbelief in the business reaching a wide-market. Terms not broadcast.	N/A	N/A
Episode 2	10 August 2006	Peter Ashley	Easy X Chair	75,000	15	Sofa chair incorporated with exercise tools	Easy X Chair's pitch failed due to the dragons' disbelief in the chair's appearance and wide-range use for exercise. Ashley later redesigned the concept for the equipment to be attached to any form of seating.		N/A
Episode 2	10 August 2006	Kevin Peter Bray and Colin Wilson	Spider Platform	N/A	N/A	Mobility device for builders accessing heights	Spider Platform's pitch failed due to the dragons citing the product as potentially unsafe and low sales.	N/A	N/A
Episode 2	10 August 2006	Sue Andrews	Belly Busters	N/A	N/A	Board game encouraging children to eat healthy food	Belly Busters' pitch failed due to the dragons' belief that the product would be deemed as boring.	N/A	Unclear
Episode 2	10 August 2006	Susan Ayton	Legato	150,000	N/A	Wax based hair removal	Legato's pitch failed due to the dragons' belief that the product would soon be outsold by laser hair removal.	N/A	N/A
Episode 3	17 August 2006	Gerard Tomnay	The Knowledge	150,000	30	Premium-rate telephone line for navigation in London	The Knowledge's pitch failed due to the dragons citing that the product did not work and felt it was in a declining market. Dissolved by 2009.		Dissolved (2009)
Episode 3	17 August 2006	Rebecca Philipson	UR-In The Paper	N/A	N/A	Personalised tabloid newspaper covers	UR-In The Paper's pitch failed due to the dragons' belief that the product was in a limited market space and would not grow in profit. Terms not broadcast. Company went on to generate over £1 million by 2007. Dissolved by 2024.		Dissolved (2024)
Episode 3	17 August 2006	David and Sarah Glashan	Itsa	250,000	20	Beach bag extending into a towel	Itsa's pitch failed due to the dragons criticising the company's valuation and believing the product was easily replicated. Company went on to win the Double Gold Award at the British Invention Show and remains active.		Active
Episode 3	17 August 2006	Laura Chicurel	Chicurela	N/A	N/A	High-end salmon skin leather fashion accessories	Chicurela's pitch failed due to the dragons believing the use of salmon skin at a high end market to be unattractive. Terms not broadcast. Dissolved by 2011.		Dissolved (2011)
Episode 3	17 August 2006	Simon Baldwin	Tidy Tower	100,000	N/A	Fold away tidying unit for toys	Tidy Tower's pitch failed due to the dragons believing the product lacked a unique selling point. Terms of equity not broadcast. Dissolved by 2011.	N/A	Dissolved (2009)
Episode 3	17 August 2006	Bunny Hargreaves	Crystal Boots	100,000	30	Wellington boots with interchangeable appearances	Crystal Boots's pitch failed due to the dragons citing the product did not have a patent and not believing the product would not sell to a wide market.		N/A
Episode 3	17 August 2006	Peter To	Soft Paws	N/A	N/A	Paw protection for cats	Soft Paws' pitch failed due to the dragons not believing the product was suitable for many pets and would not sell to a wide market.		Active
Episode 3	17 August 2006	Daniel Chipchase	Sleepcatcher	75,000	N/A	Hammock doubling as a tent	Sleepcatchers' pitch failed due to the dragons cited the hammock lacked support when used as a tent. Remains active.		Dissolved
Episode 3	17 August 2006	Marc Williams and Richard Walker	Shadow Robot	N/A	N/A	Robotic hand used by bomb disposal experts	Shadow Robot's pitch failed due to the product's demonstration not proving its complete functionality and dragons' belief the product would not sell to a wide market. Remains active.		Active
Episode 4	24 August 2006	Adam Marshall	Fresh Feet Shower Mat (Foot Therapy Clinic)	150,000	17	Foot cleaning shower mat and gel	Foot Therapy Clinic's pitch failed due to the dragons' concern that the product was easily replicated and belief the product did not exfoliate feet as well as described. Dissolved by 2014.	N/A	Dissolved (2014)
Episode 4	24 August 2006	Dr Peter Myers	Platinum Wines	N/A	N/A	Device refreshing corked wines	Platinum Wines' pitch failed due to the dragons’ distaste of the filtered wine and disbelief that restaurants would use it as opposed to return the bottle. Terms not broadcast. Dissolved by 2008.		Dissolved (2008)
Episode 4	24 August 2006	Tim Nye	KickGolf (Nydeas)	200,000	N/A	Device for kicking balls into posts circle containers	KickGolf' pitch failed due to the dragons' dislike of the game, believing the simplicity of kicking a ball into a circular plastic ring to be dull. Terms of equity not broadcast.		N/A
Episode 4	24 August 2006	Elizabeth Light and Michelle Jones	Swirled Candy Floss	N/A	N/A	Multi-flavoured candy-flosswa	Swirled Candy Floss's pitch failed due to the dragons citing a high amount of e-additives in the floss and concerns over the profit forecasts. Terms not broadcast.	N/A	N/A
Episode 4	24 August 2006	Roark McMaster	FV Generation LTD	50,000	40	Refrigeration tool to preserve freshness of meat and vegetables	FV Generation LTD's pitch failed due to the dragons' concern that the product would not appeal to a wide range of markets. Jones however did offer McMaster a job interview should he decide to liquidate the business. Dissolved by 2007.	N/A	Dissolved (2007)
Episode 4	24 August 2006	Mike Edwards	DIY art systems	N/A	N/A	Professional help service for home decorations	DIY art systems's pitch failed due to the dragons' belief that the product would not appeal to a wide range of markets. Terms not broadcast. Company was later rebranded as DIY Doctor and remains active.		Active
Episode 4	24 August 2006	Shelia Nelson and Nike Finister	Bubble House Worm Farming	N/A	N/A	Worm breeding farm for fertilising and fish-bait	Bubble House Worm Farming's pitch failed due to the dragons' belief that the product would not appeal to a wide range of markets. Terms not broadcast. Dissolved by 2016.		Active
Episode 5	31 August 2006	Peter Matheson	Caledonian-Matheson Airways	150,000	15	Transport & sightseeing via private aeroplane service	Caledonian Airway's pitch failed due to the dragons citing Matheson's major investment into another company with no relation to the company pitched, as well as his incorrance of £2.4 million of debt. Dissolved by 2008.		Dissolved (2008)
Episode 5	31 August 2006	Shelley Green, Lydia and Annabelle Kerley	Acai Juice (ah-sigh-ee)	150,000	N/A	Brazilian fruit-based soft drink	Acai Juice's pitch failed due to the dragons citing the fruit could not be patented and felt the marketplace to be crowded. Terms of equity not broadcast. Dissolved by 2011.		Dissolved (2011)
Episode 5	31 August 2006	Mark and Wendy Litherland	Coaching Ball	50,000	N/A	Football with printed illustrations to help children learn to kick	Coaching Ball's pitched failed due to the dragons' belief that the ball lacked a unique selling point. Terms of equity not broadcast. Dissolved by 2009.		Dissolved (2009)
Episode 5	31 August 2006	Jim Tucker	Easy Tank	N/A	N/A	Portable water storage container	Easy Tank's pitch failed due to the dragons citing the design as rudimentary and a high RRP. Terms not broadcast.	N/A	N/A
Episode 5	31 August 2006	April Hutchen	Twisted Martini	80,000	25	Dating website	Twisted Martini's pitch failed due to the dragons citing the company had not made a profit due to high out-goings. Dissolved by 2011.		Dissolved (2011)
Episode 5	31 August 2006	Paul and Tom Simpson	Heritage Tables	100,000	N/A	Coffee Tables, Dining Tables and Games Tables	Heritage Tables's pitch failed due to the dragons' belief that the market was restricted and would not sell well enough to return an investment. Terms of equity not broadcast. Dissolved by 2008.		Dissolved (2008)
Episode 5	31 August 2006	Richard Kitching	Puck Puzzles	75,000	N/A	3D puzzle board games	Puck Puzzles' pitch failed due to the dragons stating they did not approve of the agreements Kitching had made with the owners of the patents. Terms of equity not broadcast.		N/A
Episode 5	31 August 2006	Tony Redfearn	Cherax Crayfish	N/A	N/A	Live crayfish breeding for caterers and restaurants	Chrex Crayfishs' pitch failed due to the dragons' concerns over the ethics of the business and citing that restaurants pay less for dead crayfish. Terms not broadcast.	N/A	N/A
Episode 6	7 September 2006	Gavin David	Baby Grippa	150,000	25	Non-latex napkin stopping infants from slipping in seats	Baby Grippa's pitch failed due to the dragons citing the product was a choking-hazard.		N/A
Episode 6	7 September 2006	Peter Davis	Axis Keyboard	100,000	N/A	Musical instrument designed as axis keyboard	Axis Keyboard's pitch failed due to the dragons citing disappointment with Davis's demonstration and low number of tests conducted. Terms of equity not broadcast.		N/A
Episode 6	7 September 2006	Jude Camplin & Chrissie Shaw	Eve'olution Solutions / Evolve Through Training	150,000	5 / 15	Female-only employment agency in construction	Eve'olution's pitch failed due to the dragons’ disgust at Camplin's attitude and citing lack of clarification over how the money would be used as an investment. The pitch has since been cited as one of the worst in the show's history. Dissolved by 2007.		Dissolved (2007)
Episode 6	7 September 2006	John Tradewll	Fraudguard	50,000	N/A	Pen marking out sensitive information on documents	Fraudguard's pitch failed due to the dragons citing the information was easily visible after usage. Equity terms not broadcast.	N/A	N/A
Episode 6	7 September 2006	John Moreland-Lynn	Polistas	200,000	N/A	Retail outlet for polo shirts	Polistas's pitch failed due to the dragons' belief that Lynn's financial projections were unrealistic. Terms of equity not broadcast. Dissolved by 2018.		Dissolved (2018)
Episode 6	7 September 2006	Nicola Carter	Zippity Duvet	N/A	N/A	Foldable and portable carriage for duvets	Zippety Duvet's pitch failed due to the dragons citing issues whilst testing the product. Terms not broadcast. Dissolved by 2014.		Dissolved (2014)
Episode 6	7 September 2006	John Hewitt and Darren Woodyer	Golden Chimes	100,000	N/A	Mobile bell-ringing units for religious ceremonies	Golden Chimes' pitch failed due to the dragons overall distaste for the product. Terms not broadcast. Dissolved by 2014.	N/A	Dissolved (2014)
Episode 7	14 September 2006	Stephen Johnston	Storycode	200,000	20	Comparison website for paperback recommendations	Storycodes' pitch failed due to the dragons' concern over where the money would be used and lack of sales to that date. Dissolved by 2013.		Dissolved (2013)
Episode 7	14 September 2006	Jason Bayliffe	Pourfect	N/A	N/A	Liquid container designed to reduce overflow	Pourfect's pitch failed due to the dragons citing the same result when laying a standard bottle sideways. Terms not broadcast. Dissolved by 2009.		Dissolved (2009)
Episode 7	14 September 2006	Paul Marshall	Bing Bang Bong	N/A	N/A	Design and manufacture of outdoor musical instruments	Bing Bang Bong's pitch failed due to the dragons blaming his low turnover on Marshall's desire to run the business alone. Terms not broadcast. Dissolved by 2015 following austerity cuts to school budgets.		Dissolved (2015)
Episode 7	14 September 2006	Sharon Palmer	Talking Tooth Timer	75,000	N/A	Mobile app designed to teach children how to brush their teeth	Talking Tooth Timer's pitch failed due to the dragons' concerns over Palmer's profit projections. Terms of equity not broadcast.	N/A	N/A
Episode 7	14 September 2006	David Daniels	Crickhitter	170,000	20	Teaching aid for cricket	Crickhitter's pitch failed due to the dragons' belief that the design was basic and did not appeal to those in the sport.		N/A
Episode 7	14 September 2006	Samantha Alfred	Jivana Style	N/A	N/A	Asian themed greeting cards	Jivana Style's pitch failed due to the dragons citing low sales and large returns of unsold stock from wholesalers. Terms not broadcast. Dissolved by 2016.		Dissolved (2015)
Episode 7	14 September 2006	Mark Hesketh	Hesketh 4x4 Razor Blades	260,000	N/A	Alternating razor blades	Hesketh 4x4 Razor Blades' pitch failed due to the dragons' dislike of the brand name and citing potential issues over the size of the product. Terms of equity not broadcast.	N/A	N/A
Episode 8	21 September 2006	Tara Dayer-Smith and Howard Letch	Pi In the Sky	250,000	N/A	Advertising via remote controlled air-ships	Pi In the Sky's pitch failed due to the dragons' concern over how much money had already been invested, low sales and the cost of manufacturing. Equity terms not broadcast. Dissolved by 2016.	N/A	Dissolved (2016)
Episode 8	21 September 2006	Richard Chadwick	Skyrota	160,000	5	Energy production via wind turbine system	Skyrota's pitch failed due to the dragons citing that Chadwick could not prove it worked and were generally unimpressed with the design. Company was sold to Sitec Infrastructure Services Ltd in 2009, mainly incorporating the gearbox system displayed.		Sold (2009)
Episode 8	21 September 2006	Abiola Ajaye-Obe	Smartchartz	180,000	18	Picture system to discourage bad behavior in children	Smartchartz's pitch failed due to the dragons’ dislike at Obe's attitude and concerns over her business model. Dissolved by 2020.		Dissolved (2020)

=== Series 4 ===
Episode	First aired	Entrepreneur(s)	Company or product name	Money requested (£)	Equity offered (%)	Description of product	dragons reaction	Website	Fate
Episode 1	7 February 2007	Steve Wright	Get Your Head Round It	147,000	25	Online education system using puppeteers as mentors	Get Your Head Round It's pitch failed due to the dragons' belief that Wright would not be able to dedicate enough time towards the product and did not see the product becoming successful. Company has since been renamed as Routes Puppets and remains active.		Active
Episode 1	7 February 2007	Sally Howe	Woolie Warmer	30,000	N/A	Warming system for new born lambs	Woolie Warmer's pitch failed due to the dragons citing Howe did not know how many she had sold and were overall unimpressed with the product. Equity terms not broadcast. Remains active.		Active
Episode 1	7 February 2007	Mike Carr	Safety In Hand	100,000	N/A	Glove to remind which side of the road to drive on	Safety In Hand's pitch failed due to the dragons lack of belief that the product was useful and that the product would sell. Equity terms not broadcast.		N/A
Episode 1	7 February 2007	Tim Jones	SmartSlice	70,000	N/A	Bar mounted lemon slicer	SmartSlice's pitch failed due to the dragons lack of belief that the product would affect a bar owner's profits. Equity terms not broadcast.	N/A	N/A
Episode 1	7 February 2007	Dr Gili Kucci	Kucci Kukui	100,000	20	Stress relieving massage service	Kucci Kukui's pitch failed due to the dragons citing Kucci did not get the company's profits accurate. Dissolved by 2011.		Dissolved (2011)
Episode 1	7 February 2007	Olly Dallish	OllyPops	50,000	N/A	Towel designed to train basics of surfing	OllyPops' pitch failed due to the dragons' belief that the product was just a towel and not a training device. The terms of equity offered were not broadcast. Remains active.		Active
Episode 1	7 February 2007	Sarah Tierney and Sarah Jackson	Miniwebs	150,000	N/A	CD-Rom gift package for setting up a website	Miniwebs' pitch failed due to the dragons citing that the product was already on the market in the same field and would soon be offered as a free service. The terms of equity offered were not broadcast. Remains active in Australia.		Active
Episode 2	14 February 2007	Paul Hope and Michael Smith	Tapanyaki Grill	175,000	N/A	Japanese style alternative to grills	Tapanyaki Grill's pitch failed due to the dragons citing the cost of the unit to be overpriced and easily replicated. The terms of equity offered were not broadcast.	N/A	N/A
Episode 2	14 February 2007	David Cosgrave and Travis McDonough	Orthotic Group Gait	75,000	15	Orthopedic treatment for feet	Orthotic Group Gait's pitch failed due to the dragons' concerns over how the investment would be used. Company has since been dissolved.	N/A	Dissolved
Episode 2	14 February 2007	Tom Jones	Varsity Wrestling	100,000	N/A	Wrestling training academy	Varsity Wrestling's pitch failed due to the dragons citing the presentation to be a gimmick and Jones' failure to remember his financial turnovers. Equity terms not broadcast. Dissolved by 2017.		Dissolved (2017)
Episode 2	14 February 2007	John Darlington	Spider Grab Rake	100,000	N/A	Garden rake with multiple grips	Spider Grab Rake's pitch failed due to the dragons citing low sales. Equity terms not broadcast. Remains active.		Dissolved (2017)
Episode 2	14 February 2007	Kate and Jerry Daly	Send A Kiss	80,000	20	Kiss casting gift service	Send A Kiss's pitch failed due to the dragons' disbelief that the product would sell to a mass market.		N/A
Episode 2	14 February 2007	Andrew Blee	Energy Saving Kettle	150,000	N/A	Kettle designed to prevent overflowing	Energy Saving Kettle's pitch failed due to the dragons' belief that the product would not sell to the mass market and deemed the features useless. Equity terms not broadcast. Dissolved by 2020.		Dissolved (2020)
Episode 2	14 February 2007	Chrissi Hewitt-Jones	Foam Dynamics	200,000	20	Dragon themed children's toys, books and DVDs	Foam Dynamics' pitch failed due to the dragons citing the company was not registered at the time, had no website and no sales to date, subsequently deeming the valuation absurd. Company was registered later that year and dissolved by 2011.	N/A	Dissolved (2011)
Episode 3	21 February 2007	Ian Softley	Steplock	200,000	40	Door-bolting security lock	Steplock's pitch failed due to Softley's failure to demonstrate the product's durability and the dragons' disbelief in his valuation.	N/A	Dissolved
Episode 3	21 February 2007	Andrew Peters	Phoneybox	100,000	N/A	Wooden replica of red telephone boxes for multi-purpose	Phoneybox's pitch failed due to the dragons' disbelief that the product would serve a multi-purpose use and would sell to a mainstream market. Equity terms not broadcast. Remains active.		Active
Episode 3	21 February 2007	Debbie Orme	Goodbye My Pet	50,000	N/A	Burial packaging for pets	Goodbye My Pet's pitch failed due to the dragons citing veterinarians offer the service free of charge whilst also noting Orme could not patent the product. Equity terms not broadcast. Company his since been dissolved.		Dissolved
Episode 3	21 February 2007	Richard and Steven Bean	Teddy Tennis	80,000	N/A	Tennis training academy for children	Teddy Tennis's pitch failed due to the dragons' belief that the product was overpriced and did not adequately teach tennis. Equity terms not broadcast. Remains active.		Active
Episode 3	21 February 2007	Vivian Blick	Tango Group	200,000	5	Water fuelled battery cells	Tango Group's pitch failed due to the dragons citing that Blick did not own the patent to the product and felt he had overvalued the company. Remains active.		Active
Episode 3	21 February 2007	Prem Singh	Med De Tour Ltd	150,000	N/A	Medical service for tourists	Med De Tour's pitch failed due to the dragons' concern for environmental issues in encouraging long-distance travel. Equity terms not broadcast. Dissolved by 2009.		Dissolved (2009)
Episode 3	21 February 2007	Reggie Donnell	Fire Escapes Ltd	200,000	N/A	Drain-pipe fitting with emergency use ladder	Fire Escape Ltd's pitch failed due to the dragons' concern over the price of the product and overall safety. Equity terms not broadcast. Dissolved by 2015.		Dissolved (2015)
Episode 4	28 February 2007	Tim Williams	Jet Sleeper	175,000	N/A	Pillow range for travellers on planes	Jet Sleeper's pitch failed due to the dragons citing uncomfortability whilst testing the product and failing to see a unique selling point. Equity terms not broadcast.		Dissolved (2008)
Episode 4	28 February 2007	Gavin Wheeldon	Applied Language Solutions	250,000	4	Online language translation for websites	Applied Language Solutions' pitch failed due to the dragons' concern over the valuation pitched and amount of guidance they felt he needed. Dissolved by 2012.	N/A	Dissolved (2012)
Episode 4	28 February 2007	Sandra-Johnson Murphy	Aqua Mum	70,000	N/A	Swimwear for pregnant women	SJM Baby Products' pitch failed due to the dragons citing physical faults with the product. Equity terms not broadcast. Dissolved by 2008.		Dissolved (2008)
Episode 4	28 February 2007	Meru Ullah & Peter Wikes	Horse Mirrors	N/A	N/A	Portable mirror for horse riders	Horse Mirrors' pitch failed due to the dragons citing safety issues with beams and reflections possibly distracting the horses. Terms not broadcast. Dissolved by 2019.		Dissolved (2019)
Episode 4	28 February 2007	Mike Catling	Intelligent Golf Trolley	N/A	N/A	Remote controlled golf trolley	Intelligent Golf Trolley's pitch failed due to the dragons' belief that golfers would find the concept irritating whilst also citing the rrp as too high. Terms not broadcast. Dissolved by 2010.	N/A	Dissolved (2010)
Episode 4	28 February 2007	Anna Dickson	Mummy Mitts	40,000	20	Gloves designed to stay attached to the prams and pushchairs	Mummy Mitts' pitch failed due to the dragons' concerns over Dickson trying to build a brand as opposed to just licensing the gloves whilst also citing issues with her financial plans. Remains active.	N/A	Active
Episode 4	28 February 2007	Jack McGenily	CU Products	75,000	N/A	Night-vision safety wear	CU Products' pitch failed due to the dragons citing the company's low turnover and high valuation. The terms of equity offered were not broadcast. Dissolved by 2010.	N/A	Dissolved (2010)
Episode 4	28 February 2007	Jon Wickham and Paul Haigh	Tidy Kleen	N/A	N/A	Bin storage for used and damaged clothing	Tidy Kleen's pitch failed due to the dragons ridiculing valuation of £500,000 with the company not trading. The terms of money and equity offered were not broadcast.	N/A	N/A
Episode 5	7 March 2007	John Binks	JVB Finger Placements	50,000	N/A	Violin finger print aid for learners	JVB Finger Placements' pitch failed due to the dragons' belief the service was not an adequate teaching tool. Equity terms not broadcast. Dissolved by 2009.		Dissolved (2009)
Episode 5	7 March 2007	Alison Davies	Doculock	100,000	N/A	Security system for paper documents in folders	Doculock's pitch failed due to the dragons' belief that the product did not secure the documents adequately and was merely an additional fitting system for the folders. Equity terms not broadcast.	N/A	N/A
Episode 5	7 March 2007	Richard Council	Verballs	50,000	N/A	Novelty phones for internet phone calls	Verballs' pitch failed due to the dragons' belief that the product was easily replicated and felt the design was unappealing. Equity terms not broadcast. Dissolved by 2018.		Dissolved (2018)
Episode 5	7 March 2007	Paige Allen & Roberth Taberna	Fruity Faces	125,000	5	Inflatable fruit packages for children	Fruity Faces' pitch failed due to the dragons citing the majority of the company's profits would go to charity and subsequently criticised the valuation. Dissolved by 2013.		Dissolved (2018)
Episode 5	7 March 2007	Karen Johnson	Bella Vita International	100,000	N/A	Permanent hair removal device	Bella Vita International's pitch failed due to the dragons citing the product's physical size not being portable and cost of £11,000. Equity terms not broadcast. Dissolved by 2011.	N/A	Dissolved (2018)
Episode 5	7 March 2007	Will Callaghan	Mansized	N/A	N/A	Web based men's health magazine	Mansized's pitch failed due to the dragons citing low profits. The terms of equity and money were not broadcast. Dissolved by 2011.		Dissolved (2016)
Episode 6	21 March 2007	Myra Ostacchini	Invisible Coach	60,000	30	Life-style coaching web based service	Invisible Coach's pitch failed due to the dragons' belief that the service would lead to frustration in lacking human interaction. Dissolved by 2011.		Dissolved (2015)
Episode 6	21 March 2007	Stuart Saunders	Tilemate	230,000	N/A	Quick-spreading adhesive gun attached to a tank	Tilemate's pitch failed due to Saunders' struggle to demonstrate the product and the dragons citing he knew little about the industry. Equity terms not broadcast. Dissolved by 2021.		Dissolved (2021)
Episode 6	21 March 2007	Matthew Brown	Halo	60,000	N/A	Re-usable bottle cap preventing drink spiking	Halo's pitch failed due to the prototype failing to sustain the demonstration. Equity terms not broadcast.	N/A	N/A
Episode 6	21 March 2007	Kunle Abidakun and Keynes Emeruwa	Suave Magazine	100,000	N/A	Business and lifestyle magazine for ethnic people	Suave Magazine's pitch failed due to the dragons' belief that the market was already overcrowded and felt both the entrepreneurs lacked experience in journalism and publishing. Equity terms not broadcast. Dissolved by 2009.		Dissolved (2009)

=== Series 5 ===
Episode	First aired	Entrepreneur(s)	Company or product name	Money requested (£)	Equity offered (%)	Description of product	dragons reaction	Website	Fate
Episode 1	15 October 2007	Andy Harmer	Double Dates	100,000	50	Online double-dating app	Double Dates' pitch failed due to the dragons' concern that the business would not handle the finances well enough to generate a profit.		N/A
Episode 1	15 October 2007	Sharon Merritt	Thydrys	81,000	N/A	Strap-on water-proofs for bike and horse riders	Thydrys' pitch failed due to the dragons' concern that the product was overpriced and unattractive. Equity terms not broadcast. Dissolved by 2009.	N/A	Dissolved (2009)
Episode 1	15 October 2007	Robert Berge	Furriballs	70,000	20	Fur based exercise and birth Swiss balls	Furriballs' pitch failed due to the dragons citing Berge had outstanding payments to collect and felt cover of fur was unnecessary for the balls. Dissolved by 2011.		Dissolved (2011)
Episode 1	15 October 2007	David Cohen and Teddy Leifer	Dates with Mates	100,000	20	Match-making dating website	Dates with Mates' pitch failed due to the dragons citing the business had made no money by offering the service for free and ridiculed the valuation. Dissolved by 2012.		Dissolved (2012)
Episode 1	15 October 2007	Martin and Susan Cowley	Cowley's Fine Foods	100,000	30	Meat and vegetarian jerkies and fruits	Cowley's Fine Foods' pitch failed due to the dragons' belief that the Cowley's lacked ambition and cited their distaste for how the pitch was presented. Remains active.		Active
Episode 1	15 October 2007	Darren Spence	Nobby Travels	150,000	N/A	Children's books depicting the adventures of a globe-trotting dog	Nobby Travels' pitch failed due to the dragons citing the product had no distributor and had no pre-orders. Equity terms not broadcast. Dissolved by 2017.		Dissolved (2017)
Episode 1	15 October 2007	Penny Morgan	Soap Pods	150,000	15	Soap created from soap nuts in China	Soap Pods' pitch failed due to the dragons citing no tests had been conducted on the product and ridiculed the valuation.		N/A
Episode 1	15 October 2007	Dominic Ponniah	Tuctuc Ltd	115,000	N/A	Auto rickshaw tourist travel for London and Brighton	Tuctuc Ltd's pitch failed due to the dragons citing the lack of space inside the vehicle and concerns it would not fare as a taxi service. Terms of equity not broadcast. Dissolved by 2010, having been fined £13,500 in 2008 following failure to operate the service as time-tabled and closing for business without giving the necessary 56 days notice.		Dissolved (2008)
Episode 2	22 October 2007	Les Laing	Spot On Golf	200,000	15	Golf training accessories	Spot On Golf's pitch failed due to the dragons citing Laing had made no sales and were unimpressed with Laing's vision for a dragon to run the company. Dissolved by 2010.		Dissolved (2010)
Episode 2	22 October 2007	Chris Mayo	Sweet Counter	100,000	10	Teaching aid for children learning how to count	Sweet Counter's pitch failed due to Mayo's presentation over-running the time limit, over-inflated valuation. Company was sold to Eastpoint Group Ltd in 2013.		Sold (2013)
Episode 2	22 October 2007	Micheal Whitam	Cavemen's Bat Guano	50,000	N/A	Organic fertilizer for plants, garden and vegetables	Cavemen Bat Guano's pitch failed due to the dragons citing Whitam was unaware of the condition's the miners were working in and stated they couldn't see growth potential. Equity terms not broadcast. Dissolved by 2010.	N/A	Dissolved (2010)
Episode 2	22 October 2007	Masuma Fatima	iBox	50,000	N/A	Foldaway ironing board with a cabinet	iBox's pitch failed due to the dragons’ dissatisfaction with the appearance of the product and belief that it did not solve any issues typical products on the market did not. Equity terms not broadcast. Duncan Bannatyne stated at the time that the product was one of the worst presented in the show's history.	N/A	N/A
Episode 2	22 October 2007	Chris Lomas	On Target	200,000	20	Toilet training aids for infants	On Target's pitch failed due to the dragons' concern major retailers had sold-out on the product but re-ordering small batches, whilst also believing Lomas did not need an investor. Bannatyne however offered him a job interview should the business fail.	N/A	N/A
Episode 2	22 October 2007	Dawn Dines	Swanky or Spanky	100,000	N/A	Devices preventing drink spiking and underwear storage for condoms	Swanky or Spanky's pitch failed due to the dragons citing the frustration of using drink covers and sexual exploitation of people carrying condoms. Equity terms not broadcast. Dines has since converted the business to a charity.		Active
Episode 2	22 October 2007	Philip Metcalfe	Kebabacue	100,000	N/A	Aid for adding ingredients to a kebab skew	Kebabacue's pitch failed due to the dragons citing lack of hygiene and ease of one using their hands. Equity terms not broadcast. Dissolved by 2025.		Dissolved (2025)
Episode 3	29 October 2007	Shaun Pulfrey	Tangle Teezer	50,000	25	Detangling, blow-drying and styling hairbrushes	Tangle Teezer's pitch failed due to the dragons' belief that the product lacked feedback from free samples and were overall unimpressed with Pulfrey's business acumen. Tangle Teezer later became one of the most successful products not to have received investment, with sales amounting to £30 million as of 2020. Remains active.		Active
Episode 3	29 October 2007	Al Brown and John Fornam	The Hot Stove	170,000	N/A	British food takeaway service	The Hot Stove's pitch failed due to the dragons citing a high setup cost and failing to see profit forecasts. Dissolved by 2010.	N/A	Dissolved (2010)
Episode 3	29 October 2007	Allan Brown & Simon Jamieson	Gift Card Converter	80,000	15	Website exchanging/purchasing gift cards	Gift Card Converter's pitch failed due to the dragons' belief that retailers could easily tighten their terms and conditions at any time making the business difficult to trade whilst also questioning the legality of the business. Dissolved by 2014.		Dissolved (2014)
Episode 3	29 October 2007	Dina Parbat	Peaches of London	80,000	12	Air popping aid for underwear	Peaches of London's pitch failed due to the dragons citing potential issues over usage and cited low sales. Dissolved by 2014.		Dissolved (2014)
Episode 3	29 October 2007	Eddie Anderson	RnB Nursery Rhymes	30,000	N/A	Nursery rhymes with R'n'B backing music	RnB Nursery Rhymes's pitch failed due to the dragons citing low profit forecasts. Dissolved by 2014.		N/A
Episode 3	29 October 2007	Jill Parkinson	Shuc	120,000	18	Portable shower head holder	Shuc's pitch failed due to the dragons' belief that the product was a burden to travel with and cited the business had made no money to date. The pitch has since been cited as one of the worst to enter the den. Dissolved by 2009.		Dissolved (2009)
Episode 3	29 October 2007	Steve Boyce and Paul Chisolme	Wheelie Spray Liquid Dispenser	55,000	N/A	Odour and bacteria control deodorizer for wheelie bins	Wheelie Spray's pitch failed due to the dragons citing the liquid did not include a disinfectant and were unconvinced the device acted adequately as a spray.		N/A
Episode 3	29 October 2007	Mark Wood	E.D.I.T International	100,000	N/A	Digital information tag for luggage	Edit UK's pitch failed due to the dragons failing to see a unique selling point as to why it was an adequate replacement for handwritten tags. Terms of equity not broadcast. Dissolved by 2011.	N/A	Dissolved (2011)
Episode 4	5 November 2007	Helen Jones and Sancha Hopkins	Tipsy Feet	60,000	N/A	Slippers storage bag designed to relieve heel pain	Tipsy Feet's pitch failed due to the dragons' belief that the company was overvalued and that the product was already on the market. Equity terms not broadcast. Company appears to have been sold by 2012.		Sold (2012)
Episode 4	5 November 2007	Denise Channing	Dance Of The Goblins (Goblin Films Ltd)	175,000	15	Fantasy film based on the book by Jaq D. Hawkins	Goblins' pitch failed due to the dragons citing the book had low sales and Channing's reluctance to discuss casting to justify where the investment would go. The film remains in pre-production as of 2022. Remains active.		Active
Episode 4	5 November 2007	John Nairn	Moo-Vit	160,000	N/A	Fruit flavoured milk smoothies	Moo-Vit' pitch failed due to the dragons' dislike of the taste. Equity terms not broadcast. Remains active.		Active
Episode 4	5 November 2007	Dominic Gleeson	Teach Mix	75,000	N/A	DJ and mixing teaching aid	Teach Mix's pitch failed due to the dragons' belief that the instructions were not useful and the product was not copyright protected. Terms of equity not broadcast. Dissolved by 2017.		Dissolved (2017)
Episode 4	5 November 2007	Shakil Mussa and Leon Hamlet	Aquanought	150,000	15	Waterless car washing service	Aquanought's pitch failed due to the dragons’ dissatisfaction with the company's financial projections and described the valuation as flawed. Company was sold in 2016 and dissolved by 2021.		Dissolved (2021)
Episode 4	5 November 2007	Vince Castiglia	Box Tidy	150,000	N/A	Car storage for grocery shopping	Box Tidy's pitch failed due to the dragons' belief that the product would not sell to a mass market. Equity terms not broadcast. Remains active.		Active
Episode 4	5 November 2007	Georgina Bingham	Angel Heart	150,000	N/A	Children's themed light switches	Angel Heart's pitch failed due to the dragons' belief that the retailers were already declining the product and cited low sales. Equity terms not broadcast.	N/A	Dissolved (2014)
Episode 5	19 November 2007	David Field and Ali Kord	Virtual Puppet	200,000	30	Virtual character human controlled via interactive systems	Virtual Puppet's pitch failed due to the dragons citing the product was too overpriced and would not appeal to a mass market. Company is in liquidation as of 2019.	N/A	Liquidation (2019)
Episode 5	19 November 2007	Camilla Frederick	Twin Peaked Hats	100,000	N/A	Golfing hats designed to block various distraction	Twin Peaked Hats' pitch failed due to the dragons citing low sales and felt similar products were already on the market. Equity terms not broadcast.	N/A	N/A
Episode 5	19 November 2007	Vaughan Lovelock and Greg Rank	Goalband	100,000	20	Silicon coated headband aid for training footballers on heading	Goalband's pitch failed due to the dragons' belief that the band was not attractive and cited low sales. Dissolved by 2012.		Dissolved (2012)
Episode 5	19 November 2007	Virginia and Colin Stanwell-Smith	Floataway	180,000	N/A	Floatation therapy tanks	Floataway's pitch failed due to the entrepreneurs reluctance to offer part of their manufacturing business as well as the one pitched, whilst the dragons were unimpressed with the model. Company appears to have been sold by 2013.		Sold (2013)
Episode 5	19 November 2007	Anne Hempstock	Cream Cutie	150,000	20	Wine based chocolate orange cream liqueur	Cream Cuties' pitch failed due to the dragons deeming the valuation to be too high and cited low sales. Dissolved by 2015.		Dissolved (2015)
Episode 5	19 November 2007	David Hatdon	Radiator Convectors	60,000	N/A	Energy saving device connected to radiators	Radiator Convectors' pitch failed due to the dragons citing the product as noisy and concerns over dust and mould. Equity terms not broadcast. Dissolved by 2018.	N/A	Dissolved (2018)
Episode 5	19 November 2007	Andrew Brodie	BamZ	50,000	N/A	Interactive insoles for children's shoes	BamZ's pitch failed due to the dragons’ dissatisfaction with the name of the brand and cited the entrepreneurs did not know whether they had turned a profit to date. Equity terms not broadcast. Dissolved by 2019.	N/A	Dissolved (2019)
Episode 6	26 November 2007	Sid Sims	Back to the Movies	50,000	25	Performance shows based on movie soundtracks	Back to the Movies's pitch failed due to the dragons' concerns over financial forecasts and potential struggles with Sims business model.		N/A
Episode 6	26 November 2007	Jonathan Hewitt	Dig 'n' Drive	75,000	N/A	Coin operating mini-ride for children	Dig 'n' Drive's pitch failed due to the dragons citing the ease of several being bought and leased out as opposed to the company receiving royalties from rentals. Terms of equity not broadcast. Dissolved by 2019.	N/A	N/A
Episode 6	26 November 2007	Ruby Spolia and Amita Simons	Lemongold	80,000	N/A	Gourmet home party events organiser	Lemongold's pitch failed due to the dragons citing a lack of unique selling points for the foods shown. Terms of equity not broadcast. Dissolved by 2011.		Dissolved (2011)
Episode 6	26 November 2007	Stewart Miller	Swamp Soccer	75,000	15	Six-a-side football played on a pitch made from mud	Swamp Soccer's pitch failed due to the dragons failing to vision the profitability of the business from an investment. Dissolved by 2016.		Dissolved (2016)
Episode 6	26 November 2007	Susanne Chishti	Yes!Superbaby!	175,000	10	Breastfeeding top increasing comfort and privacy	Yes!Superbaby!'s pitch failed due to the dragons citing low sales and concerns over how much money Chishty had already invested. Dissolved by 2015.		Dissolved (2015)
Episode 6	26 November 2007	Paul Allen and Leo Carlile	Puk	75,000	N/A	Wrist-aid for keyboard users	Puk's pitch failed due to the dragons' concerns over the marketing strategy and disbelief that it would sell to a wide enough market for investment. Dissolved by 2009.	N/A	Dissolved (2009)
Episode 6	26 November 2007	Bruce Durham	Premier Corporate Training	170,000	N/A	Extreme physical training methods	Premier Corporate Training's pitch failed due to the dragons citing concerns over Durham's financial projections and were generally unimpressed by the flamboyance in his pitch. Dissolved by 2016.		Dissolved (2015)
Episode 7	3 December 2007	Neil Kelsall	Malagassy Ltd	150,000	10	Ethical chocolate, coffee and spice snacks	Malagassy's pitch failed due to the dragons citing no profits to date and ridiculed the valuation. Company has since been dissolved.	N/A	Dissolved
Episode 7	3 December 2007	Andrew Sneath	Hydrodome	300,000	20	Underwater adventure centre with robotic sea creatures	Hydrodome's pitch failed due to the dragons ridiculing the valuation based on the fact that the product had not yet been built. Dissolved by 2014.		Dissolved (2014)
Episode 7	3 December 2007	Rowan Brook	Minicat	50,000	N/A	Inflatable boat fitting into portable bag	Minicat's pitch failed due to the dragons citing low sales and could not foresee a return on the business. Terms of equity not broadcast. Dissolved by 2011.		Dissolved (2011)
Episode 7	3 December 2007	Tanya Thomas	Noah's Arc Factory	120,000	N/A	Portable soft toy stuffing machine	Noah's Arc Factory's pitch failed due to the dragons' belief the product would not sell to a mass market. Terms of equity not broadcast. Dissolved by 2010.	N/A	Dissolved (2010)
Episode 7	3 December 2007	Sam Wrigglesworth	Primoris	60,000	N/A	Corporate racing day entertainment	Primoris's pitch failed due to the dragons citing that Wrigglesworth had no contracts in place and subsequently ridiculed the valuation. Terms of equity not broadcast. Dissolved by 2009.		Dissolved (2009)
Episode 7	3 December 2007	Hafida Sarachi	Handygirl	84,000	15	Female run DIY service	Handygirl's pitch failed due to the dragons citing potential gender-neutrality issues and not seeing any unique purpose. Remains active.	N/A	Active
Episode 7	3 December 2007	Roark McMaster	The Mac Strap	60,000	N/A	Solar charging portal for outdoor electrical devices	The Mac Strap's pitch failed due to the dragons citing McMaster did not have any orders to date and described the product as over-engineered. Peter Jones alleged that he was still willing to employ McMaster's previous pitch was still available should the company not progress. Remains active.	N/A	Active
Episode 8	11 December 2007	Clare Sagar and Gill Kirtland	Tingo Tang	100,000	20	Jewellery indicating single people	Tingo Tang's pitch failed due to the dragons deeming the product embarrassing and would be ignored in favour of dating sites. Remains active.		N/A
Episode 8	11 December 2007	Jon Hemmings	Mr Stripey	60,000	N/A	Six striped flavoured ice cream	Mr Stripey's pitch failed due to the dragons citing low sales and being in an over-crowded marketplace. Terms of equity not broadcast. Company does not appear to have been listed, however the website states it is no longer trading.		N/A
Episode 8	10 December 2007	Amthony Clough	Magnetic Connection	165,000	10	Magnetic fitting for light-bulbs	Magnetic Connection's pitch failed due to the dragons citing another private investor already owned 40% and still owed a return. Dissolved by 2013.	N/A	Dissolved (2013)
Episode 8	10 December 2007	Barry Halliday	Whatsyatag	100,000	N/A	Leisurewear with ciphered language	Whatsyatag's pitch failed due to the dragons' disbelief that the mass market would understand the coded system. Terms of equity not broadcast. Dissolved by 2013.		Dissolved (2013)
Episode 8	10 December 2007	Matthew White	Infra-red hand dryer	100,000	N/A	Hand-dryer using infra-red heat	Infra-Red Handy Dryer's pitch failed due to the dragons citing the length of time to dry and the physical size of the product being unusually large. Terms of equity not broadcast.	N/A	N/A
Episode 8	10 December 2007	Aline Holmes	Happy Horse (Limpet Saddlepad)	95,000	N/A	Breathable open-cell saddle pad for horse riders	Happy Horse's pitch failed due to the dragons frustration that Holmes had not marketed the product since the mid-1990s and low sales. Equity terms not broadcast. Dissolved by 2012.		Dissolved (2012)
Episode 8	10 December 2007	John Barstead and Mark Tracy	Dolphin Alarms	150,000	N/A	Alarms for swimming pools	Dolphin Alarms' pitch failed due to the dragons' disbelief that the product was attractive and was overpriced. Equity terms not broadcast. Dissolved by 2020.		Dissolved (2020)
Episode 8	10 December 2007	Peter Caddick and Deborah Coates	Seraphina	75,000	N/A	Elasticated girdle for pregnant women	Seraphina's pitch failed due to the dragons' disbelief that the product would sell to a mass market. Equity terms not broadcast. Dissolved by 2020.	N/A	N/A
Episode 9	18 December 2007	Tim Lloyd	Tidy Tree Sack	150,000	40	Fold-away bag for Christmas trees	Tidy Tree Sack's pitch failed due to the dragons citing the bag costing the same as a fresh Christmas tree and was easily replicated. Dissolved by 2010.	N/A	Dissolved (2010)
Episode 9	18 December 2007	Iain McGill and Joe Gill	About Time	40,000	N/A	Board game based on trivial questions	About Time's pitch failed due to the dragons citing dismal financial forecasts and debts. Equity terms not broadcast. Remains active.		Active
Episode 9	18 December 2007	Suzanne Colbert	Love Unzipped	60,000	30	Adult board game for singles	Love Unzipped's pitch failed due to the dragons citing Colbert had no experience in the field and feared the investment to be high risk, deeming sales unlikely.		N/A
Episode 9	18 December 2007	John and Fiona Chambers	Black Hole	60,000	20	Board game based on Word Game	Black Hole's pitch failed due to the dragons citing lack of unique selling point and deemed the game boring. Dissolved by 2016.		Dissolved (2016)

=== Series 6 ===
Episode	First aired	Entrepreneur(s)	Company or product name	Money requested (£)	Equity offered (%)	Description of product	Dragons reaction	Website	Fate
Episode 1	21 July 2008	Matthew Ryan	Leenon Ltd	81,000	5	Travel pillow with non-slip attachment	Leenon's pitch failed due to the dragons generally feeling unimpressed with the product's design and cited Ryan's lack of knowledge on his numbers. Dissolved by 2013.	N/A	Dissolved (2013)
Episode 1	21 July 2008	Barry Ritchie and Paul Lobo	Air Oasis Ltd	125,000	10	Water created by air particles	Air Oasis's pitch failed due to the dragons’ distaste for the water produced by the machine and were unimpressed by Ritchie's suggestion of pyramid scheming. Dissolved by 2009.	N/A	Dissolved (2009)
Episode 1	21 July 2008	Albert Jimenez and Kate Ingram	Baby Station	150,000	N/A	Infant chair with increased cushions and toys	Baby Station's pitch failed due to the dragons citing lack of interest with major retailers and felt the product lacked a unique selling point. Equity terms not broadcast. Dissolved by 2017.		Dissolved (2017)
Episode 1	21 July 2008	Barry Piorkowski	Strike-Trainer	100,000	N/A	Hi-tech punching bag	Strike Trainer's pitch failed due to the dragons citing similar products already on the market and concerns over lack of patent protection. The equity requested was not broadcast. Dissolved by 2019.	N/A	Dissolved (2019)
Episode 1	21 July 2008	Jon Foster-Smith and Rose Adams	Layline Bed Sheets	50,000	20	Bed sheet with line determining space for each sleeper	Layline Bedsheet's pitch failed due to the dragons' disbelief that the product would sell to a mass market.		Dissolved (2018)
Episode 1	21 July 2008	Matt Keppell	Gradulicious	70,000	13	Social networking for graduates	Gradulacious' pitch failed due to the dragons failing to understand the business model and citing low profits. Terms of equity not broadcast. Dissolved by 2009.		Dissolved (2009)
Episode 1	21 July 2008	Craig Hulson and Greg Pearson	Paralysed Panels	85,000	20	Photogenic garden fences	Paralysed Panels' pitch failed due to the dragons’ dislike of the fence's appearance and belief it would not appeal to a mass market.	N/A	N/A
Episode 2	28 July 2008	Samantha Gore	Saboteur Crime Prevention	275,000	10	Electronic vision and sound projection devices	Saboteur Crime Prevention's pitch failed due Gore failing to demonstrate the product's quality and citing the ease of theft and tampering. Dissolved by 2013.		Dissolved (2013)
Episode 2	28 July 2008	Robert Read and Bryan Rawlings	Booster Blades	150,000	N/A	Roller blades with a pedal	Booster Blades's pitch failed due to the dragons' belief that the product was unappealing and would not sell to a mass market. Dissolved by 2024.		Dissolved (2024)
Episode 2	28 July 2008	Paul Hartley and Enid Denley	Greet Me Eat Me	20,000	10	Edible greetings cards for dogs	Greet Me Eat Me's pitch failed due to the dragons' belief that it would not sell to a mass market and needed too much time from an investor to launch the business.		N/A
Episode 2	28 July 2008	Jeremy Whitticase	Impact Items Ltd	75,000	15	Glazed putty with multi-purpose use	Impact Items Ltd's pitch failed due to the dragons failing to identify the product's target audience and belief that Whitticase could invent better products. Dissolved by 2011.		Dissolved (2011)
Episode 2	28 July 2008	Richard Mire	Carbon Six	150,000	15	Tokens system limiting time children watch TV	Carbon Six's pitch failed due to the dragons' belief that the product was patronising towards parents and were irritated that he was not investing the money himself as one of his other companies had made £300,000 net profit. Remains active.		Active
Episode 2	28 July 2008	Jeremy and Alexia Benson	Chilly Billy	150,000	N/A	Fruit made ice lolly	Chilly Billy's pitch failed due to the dragons citing ice cream markets to be difficult to create profit whilst also noting Benson's high production cost. Terms of equity not broadcast. Remains active.		Active
Episode 2	4 August 2008	Amanda Asharka Iqo	'Baby on Board' Light Sign	90,000	N/A	Light up 'baby on board' sign	Light Sign's pitch failed due to the dragons citing the product was difficult to see in daylight and did not believe it competed with other products on the market. Terms of equity not broadcast.	N/A	N/A
Episode 3	4 August 2008	Lesley Ann-Simmons	Shoes Galore Ltd	100,000	30	Clothes sales for events	Shoes Galore's pitch failed due to the dragons citing a high cost of the storage and a long-term repayment structure. Dissolved by 2023.		Dissolved (2023)
Episode 3	4 August 2008	Adam Arber and Charlie Branson	Roadkill Toys	50,000	N/A	Soft toys designed on road kill animals	Roadkill Toys' pitch failed due to the dragons’ disgust towards toys based on roadkill and concerns that Branson had another company with a turnover of £8,000,000 yet still asked for investment. Equity terms not broadcast. Dissolved by 2016.		Dissolved (2016)
Episode 3	4 August 2008	Hazel Ives	Monkey Trunks	100,000	20	US based adventure park	Monkey Trunks' pitch failed due to the dragons citing Ive's lack of business experience and felt the park being based in America was too distant to consider investment. Company ceased trading in 2020 due to the COVID-19 pandemic.		Dissolved (2020)
Episode 3	4 August 2008	Ed Wray	BarbeSkew	180,000	N/A	Rotisserie barbecue grill	BarbeSkew's pitch failed due to the dragons' concern over the RRP and felt the product lacked copyright protection. Terms of equity not broadcast. Company has since been classified as one of the most successful products not to receive investment on the show. Barbeskew was sold to Mayo Engineering Ltd in 2016.		Sold (2016)
Episode 3	4 August 2008	Peter Hopton	Very PC	250,000	5	Eco-friendly low energy PCs	Very PC's pitch failed due to the dragons' concern over the company's valuation and Peter Jones' citing the eco-friendly output pitched to be the same as the average PC. Hopton has since stood down as managing director though remains active.		Active
Episode 4	11 August 2008	Michael North	Really Fresh Olive Oil Club	50,000	10	Subscription to fresh olive oils	Really Fresh Olive Oil Club's pitch failed due to the dragons' concerns that North had not calculated his profit forecasts and lacked business acumen. Remains active.		Active
Episode 4	11 August 2008	Brian James	S-Brief	50,000	20	Men's enhancing underwear	S-Brief's pitch failed due to the dragons' belief the product lacked a unique selling point and was no different to products already on the market.	N/A	N/A
Episode 4	11 August 2008	Mark Huyton	Visor Vision Helmets Ltd (renamed Versa Sacks Ltd)	50,000	N/A	Motorcycle visor with electronic screen swipe	Visor Vision Helmets's pitch failed due to the dragons' citing no patent and stating Huyton was better suited to offer the swipe technology to current helmet manufacturers as opposed to creating a competing one. Dissolved by 2010.	N/A	Dissolved (2010)
Episode 4	11 August 2008	Sue Bell	Poo Pod	N/A	N/A	Dog handle with scooping container	Poo Pod's pitch failed due to the dragons' belief that they would not receive a return on investment with predicted sales. Terms not broadcast. Dissolved by 2015.		Dissolved (2015)
Episode 4	11 August 2008	Robert and David Hall	Robert Hall	50,000	40	Investment to launch Robert Hall's racing career	Robert Hall's pitch failed due to the dragons citing the investment would dramatically increase to see Hall reach competitions such as Formula One and deemed the investment too high a risk. His company Bromyard Tyres Ltd was dissolved by 2022.		Dissolved (2022)
Episode 4	11 August 2008	Giancarlo Calderini	Navspy (renamed Smartfull Services Ltd)	N/A	N/A	Website tracking mobile phone signals	Navspys's pitch failed due to the dragons' concern over stalking and risks of breaching human rights. Terms not broadcast. Remains active.		Active
Episode 4	11 August 2008	Colin and Eona Gilchris	The Articulate Gallery	40,000	N/A	3D photo frames for children's artwork	The Articulate Gallery's pitch failed due to the dragons' concern over the RRP and felt school particularly would deem it too expensive. Terms of equity not broadcast. Remains active.		Active
Episode 5	18 August 2008	Yann Seznec	Loop Machine	150,000	N/A	Music creation software operated by the Nintendo Wii	Loop Machine's pitch failed due to the dragons citing Seznac's lack of business acumen and lack of knowledge regarding the Nintendo games market. Terms of equity not broadcast. Dissolved by 2020.		Dissolved (2020)
Episode 5	18 August 2008	Frank Bisson	FB1 (Frank Bisson 1)	100,000	5	Glass hair cutting blade	FB1's pitch failed due to the dragons citing Bisson suggested he had already invested £800,000 to low sales and struggled to calculate his finances. Dissolved by 2024.		Dissolved (2024)
Episode 5	17 August 2008	Frank Hauser and Dennis Lantsbury	Hedgehog Golf Company	150,000	N/A	Wheel-guard for golf trolleys	Hedgehog Golf Company's pitch failed due to the dragons' belief that the business was over-valued. Peter Jones stated he would have invested in the company should they have asked for £50,000. Terms of equity not broadcast. Remains active.		Active
Episode 5	17 August 2008	Bilfer Ecin	Break Down Visibility	50,000	N/A	High visibility car safety vest	Break Down Visibility's pitch failed due to the dragons citing Ecin's lack of research in the market and concerns that the product was actually a danger. Terms of equity not broadcast. Remains active.	N/A	Active
Episode 5	17 August 2008	Niall Harbison and Sean Fee	iFood TV	100,000	10	Online collection of video recipes and cooking shows	iFoods's pitch failed due to the dragons citing the company's valuation as inaccurate and the company's name causing impending conflict with Apple. Dissolved by 2020.		Dissolved (2020)
Episode 5	17 August 2008	Caroline King	Glowkids	70,000	N/A	High visibility clothing for children	Glowkids' pitch failed due to the dragons citing King did not know her finances and found her uncredible for investment. Equity terms not broadcast. Remains active.		Active
Episode 5	17 August 2008	Andrew Cunningham	Air Head Hard Hats	150,000	25	Personalised construction hard harts	Air Head Hard Hats' pitch failed due to the dragons' belief that the design's were not suited for construction. Dissolved by 2009.	N/A	Dissolved (2009)
Episode 6	25 August 2008	Geoff and Robert Hill	Ladderbox UK	100,000	15	Portable toolbox attaching to ladders	Ladderbox UK's pitch failed due to the dragons citing the duo had struggled to sell many of the units and could not confirm their projections. Dissolved by 2021.		Dissolved (2021)
Episode 6	25 August 2008	Ian Mann	E-Z-C (Easy See)	200,000	20	High-visibility luggage label	E-Z-C's pitch failed due to the dragons citing Man had invested less than £500 into the company and subsequently ridiculed the valuation.	N/A	N/A
Episode 6	25 August 2008	Daniel Rodgers	Inchworm Shoes	N/A	N/A	Extendable soles for shoes	Inchworm Shoes' pitch failed due to the dragons' concern over Rodgers rights to sell the product and lacked a brand. Terms not broadcast. Dissolved by 2012.		Dissolved (2012)
Episode 6	25 August 2008	Sam Rose	Blow Me	75,000	N/A	Alcohol breath testing	Blow Me's pitch failed due to the dragons citing the product was already on the market and failed to see a difference in Rose's product. Terms of equity not broadcast.	N/A	N/A
Episode 6	25 August 2008	Juliette Thomas	Juliettes Interiors	106,000	20	Luxury furniture fittings	Juliette's Interiors' pitch failed due to the dragons' concern that Juliette was personally living on government support at the time which indicated generating profit may lead to her using the investment to live on. Remains active.		Active
Episode 6	25 August 2008	Caroline Smart	Nod Off (renamed Yo Glasgow!)	30,000	N/A	Meditating tutorial language system	Nod Off's pitch failed due to the dragons describing the product as boring and citing low sales. Terms of equity not broadcast. Remains active.		Active
Episode 6	25 August 2008	Romi Parmer	3G Dating Agency	50,000	N/A	Dating website accessed via QR code	3G Dating Agency's pitch failed due to the dragons citing low numbers of people actually meeting up and no turnover to date. Terms of equity not broadcast. Dissolved by 2010.		Dissolved (2010)
Episode 7	1 September 2008	Simon and Gaby Luckner	Luckner's Auctioneers	150,000	N/A	Online auction house	Luckner's Auctioneer's pitch failed due to the dragons citing the company was suffering major losses after 2 years of trading whilst also fearing larger organisations were draining the profits. Terms of equity not broadcast. Dissolved by 2009.		Dissolved (2009)
Episode 7	1 September 2008	Tiny Deol	TinyDeol.com	52,000	15	Fat free curry sauces	Tiny Deol's pitch failed due to the dragons’ disappointment with the branding of the product and concerns over the transfer of intellectual property from her previous company Curryslim Limited. Dissolved by 2015.		Dissolved (2015)
Episode 7	1 September 2008	Christian Hall and Oliver Perry	Career Mole	50,000	N/A	Recruitment website with direct contact to current employees	Career Mole's pitch failed due to the dragons' concerns over the employee reward system and low spending on marketing. Terms of equity not broadcast. Company website states they ceased trading by May 2009.		N/A
Episode 7	1 September 2008	Elizabeth Pimm	Baby Go	120,000	N/A	Individual disposable nappy packets	Baby Go's pitch failed due to the dragons' belief that larger brands could easily compete and that the market was not big enough. Terms of equity not broadcast. Dissolved by 2014.	N/A	Dissolved (2014)
Episode 7	1 September 2008	Martin Wadsworth	Discrete Heat	150,000	10	Heating system behind skirting boards	Discrete Heat's pitch failed due to the dragons' concern over the cost of redecoration including installation of the product and citing Wadsworth may already have had the money to invest himself. Remains active.		Active
Episode 7	1 September 2008	Paul Sonabend and John Pepperell	Poppit Out (Mon Glace)	150,000	N/A	Ice cream flavours and containers	Poppit Out's pitch failed due to the dragons citing the company promoted the use of plastic and felt the market to be overcrowded. Terms of equity not broadcast. Dissolved by 2019. Sonabend and Pepperell both retired as company directors by 2013.		Dissolved (2013)
Episode 7	1 September 2008	John and Gerald Abraham	Easy Shelf	40,000	N/A	Shelf designed to hold shaving and mobile devices whilst charging	Easy Shelf's pitch failed due to the dragons citing the weak infrastructure as a fire hazard. Terms of equity not broadcast. Dissolved by 2010.	N/A	Dissolved (2010)
Episode 8	8 September 2008	Simon Boyle	Beyond Boyle	N/A	N/A	Hospitality business/corporate team	Beyond Boyle's pitch failed due to the dragons citing similar failed ventures by bigger companies and questioned Boyle's desire to employ homeless people as chefs. Terms not broadcast. Dissolved by 2012.		Dissolved (2012)
Episode 8	8 September 2008	Natalie Ellis	Road Refresher	120,000	15	Splash proof dog bowl	Road Refresher's pitch failed due to the dragons citing Ellis had an outstanding VAT bill and liquidated her previous company. Remains active.		Active
Episode 8	8 September 2008	David Holdsworth	Superspout	80,000	N/A	Fuel can nozzle with automatic stop	Superspout's' pitch failed due to the dragons citing a high RRP and belief the product would not reach a mass market. Terms of equity not broadcast. Remains active.		Active

=== Series 7 ===
Episode	First aired	Entrepreneur(s)	Company or product name	Money requested (£)	Equity offered (%)	Description of product	Dragons reaction	Website	Fate
Episode 1	15 July 2009	Katie Olver	U Star Novels	75,000	N/A	Personalised romance novels	U Star Novels' pitch failed. The dragons appeared to enjoy Olver's presentation and books, although reasons as to why they declined to invest remain unclear. Terms of equity not broadcast. Dissolved by 2022.		Active
Episode 1	15 July 2009	Russ Besseta Rusool	Anti Wrinkle Hat	115,000	N/A	Headband to stop wrinkles	Anti Wrinkle Hat's pitch failed due to the dragons' disbelief that the product was medically proven to work. Terms of equity not broadcast.		N/A
Episode 1	15 July 2009	Samantha Kemp	Kemp Controller	105,000	N/A	Harness to control horses	Kemp Controller's pitch failed due to the dragons citing low profits. Terms of equity not broadcast. Dissolved by 2013.		Dissolved (2013)
Episode 1	15 July 2009	Alan Mandel Butler	Apocalypse	200,000	20	Interactive live horror entertainment	Apocalypse's pitch failed due to the dragons citing the valuation as over-inflated and lack of return potential on the investment. Dissolved by 2010.		Dissolved (2010)
Episode 1	15 July 2009	Phil Crisp	Happy Cat Collar	150,000	N/A	Nylon wire collar for cats	Happy Cat Collar's pitch failed due to the dragons citing low sales and an over-inflated valuation. Terms of equity not broadcast. Remains active.		Dissolved (2021)
Episode 1	15 July 2009	Anna and Mark Jezierski	Stolat	250,000	N/A	Quadruple distilled 40% vodka	Stolat's pitch failed due to the dragons citing the cost of launching the product as more than the investment requested. Terms not broadcast. Remains active.	N/A	Active
Episode 2	22 July 2009	David Thomas	Roto Suite	100,000	N/A	Revolving en-suite bathroom	Roto Suite's pitch failed due to the dragons citing the amount of space required to install the product whilst also noting Thomas ran a company which could fund the product without further help. Terms of equity not broadcast. Dissolved by 2010.	N/A	Dissolved (2010)
Episode 2	22 July 2009	Ajedare Doherty	Whole Leaf Company	120,000	20	Biodegradable, compostable plates & bowls	Whole Leaf Company's pitch failed due to the dragons citing low volumes of sales and disbelief that Doherty could sell enough to compete financially with similar products. Company was dissolved in 2014.		Dissolved (2014)
Episode 2	22 July 2009	Beverly Binda	Blouse and Skirt	100,000	N/A	Fashion make-up brand for ethnic skin tones	Blouse and Skirt's pitch failed due to the dragons citing losses in profit and advised Binda to work as a developer as opposed to run the business. Terms of equity not broadcast. Company was dissolved in 2010.		Dissolved (2010)
Episode 2	22 July 2009	Peter Giles and Bhjata	London Whistle	75,000	N/A	Whistle alert for bicycles	London Whistle's pitch failed due to the dragons' disbelief that the product stood out over current products. Terms of equity not broadcast.	N/A	N/A
Episode 2	22 July 2009	Jeraint 'JJ' Hazan	'JJ' Hazan	65,000	40	Poker player sponsorship	'JJ' Hazan's pitch failed due to the dragons deeming the investment to be high risk and not regarding it as a business opportunity.	N/A	N/A
Episode 2	22 July 2009	Chris and Robert Downham	Reward Life Limited	100,000	10	Online security storage for financial documents	Chris and Robert Downham's pitch failed due to the dragons citing the company had no website and could not produce any form of product to demonstrate.		Dissolved (2017)
Episode 2	22 July 2009	Spencer Philips	Driver Eight	85,000	N/A	Wrist watch designed for drivers	Driver Eight's pitch failed due to the dragons' disbelief that the product was useful for drivers when the time was available on their dashboard whilst citing discomfort whilst wearing. Terms of equity not broadcast.		N/A
Episode 3	29 July 2009	Josephine Buchon	Dusty – The Dusty Springfield Musical	250,000	25	Jukebox musical based on Dusty Springfield	Josephine Buchon's pitch failed due to the dragons' concern over her offer of 80% of profits leading to only 20% of the company's returns and distrust in her business acumen. Dissolved by 2011, however the musical was eventually released by Jonathan Harvey in 2018.		Dissolved (2011)
Episode 3	29 July 2009	Latasha Malik and Neil Ambler	Tantrum Boutique	250,000	N/A	Hair and dental products for children	Tantrum's pitch failed due to the dragons citing major net losses and subsequently ridiculing the valuation. Terms of equity not broadcast. Dissolved by 2013.		Dissolved (2013)
Episode 3	29 July 2009	John Gubba and Trevor Smith	Blue Animals	50,000	N/A	Online animal stock footage library	Blue Animals' pitch failed due to the dragons’ dissatisfaction with the return forecast following the duo's failure to calculate their profit margins. Terms of equity not broadcast. Company has since merged with VSI Enterprises Ltd and remains active.		Active
Episode 3	29 July 2009	James Bonny and Tim Oberg	London Star Map	60,000	N/A	Tourist transportation for celebrity landmarks	London Star Map's pitch failed due to the dragons' concern over the difficulty of accessing the locations proposed whilst overall uninterested in the business model. Terms of equity not broadcast. Dissolved by 2017.		Dissolved (2017)
Episode 3	29 July 2009	Emily Webb	Oarsome Potential	75,000	20	Grip accessory for rowing blades	Oarsome Potential's pitch failed due to the dragons' concerns over areas where Webb would invest the money and advised her to finish university before progressing. Remains active.		Active
Episode 3	29 July 2009	David Atkins and Alan Robinson	Bike Stoppa	125,000	N/A	Remote control safety device for children's bicycles	Bike Stoppa's pitch failed due to the dragons' concerns over children depending on others to brake for them and subsequently becoming a safety hazard. Terms of equity not broadcast. Dissolved by 2010.		Dissolved (2010)
Episode 3	29 July 2009	Howard and Patricia Carter	Incognito	100,000	N/A	Chemical free anti-mosquito spray	Incognito's pitch failed due to the dragons not citing any difference in quality to what was already on the market as well as being unimpressed with the branding. Terms of equity not broadcast. Remains active.		Active
Episode 4	5 August 2009	Patrick Thirkell	Spey Bay Mussell Farm	100,000	20	Offshore seafood company	Spey Bay Mussell Farm's pitch failed due to the dragons citing Thrikell's lack of expertise in fishing and his struggle to explain his finances. Dissolved by 2011.		Dissolved (2011)
Episode 4	5 August 2009	Philip and Robert Pain	Combi-case	200,000	N/A	Foldaway sunbed in a suitcase	Combi-case's pitch failed due to the dragons feeling unimpressed with the demonstration and felt the product was an effort to carry. Terms of equity not broadcast.		N/A
Episode 4	5 August 2009	Richard La Ruina and Kezia Noble	PUA Training	100,000	N/A	Tutorial classes for dating	Richard La Ruina's pitch failed due to the dragons uncomfortability with the business model and finding the pitch comical. Terms of equity not broadcast. Company was dissolved in 2015.		Dissolved (2015)
Episode 4	5 August 2009	Tim Warrington and John Smith	The Thingy	60,000	N/A	Digging accessory aiding discomfort	The Thingy's pitch failed due to the dragons citing the name as unmarketable and the product already being on the market. Terms of equity not broadcast.	N/A	N/A
Episode 4	5 August 2009	William Sachiti	Clever Bins	65,000	10	Solar powered street bin	Clever Bins' pitch failed due to the dragons' concerns over whether Sachiti was modelling the business over marketing potentials or sales of the bins whilst citing he only had potential pre-orders and no sales. Company was sold to Keep Britain Tidy in 2010.		Sold (2013)
Episode 4	5 August 2009	Alan McElligott	Bottle Buddy	70,000	N/A	Pre-set baby formula dispensing machine	Bottle Buddy's pitch failed due to the dragons' disbelief that the product would be an adequate substitute for manually scooping formula powder. Terms of equity not broadcast.	N/A	N/A
Episode 4	5 August 2009	Abigail and Flurr Emery	GrassHopper Porridge	100,000	N/A	Organic porridge in single portion pot	GrassHopper's pitch failed due to the dragons not seeing a unique selling point and cited the business was in a strain of debt. Terms of equity not broadcast.	N/A	N/A
Episode 5	12 August 2009	Chris O'Niall, Dean Walton and Raymond Duffy	Masquerade.com	50,000	10	Personalised cut-out masks	Masquerade.com's pitch failed due to the dragons citing a long repayment period for the investment. Terms of equity not broadcast.		N/A
Episode 5	12 August 2009	Scott and Laura Dutton	Bra Angel	50,000	N/A	Bra underwire repair kit	Bra Angel's pitch failed due to the dragons citing the RRP to be low cost and felt the product lacked longevity on its own. Terms of equity not broadcast. Dissolved by 2010.		Dissolved (2010)
Episode 5	12 August 2009	Jonathan Sotlow	All Dog Bakery	75,000	N/A	Luxury dog biscuits	All Dog Bakery's pitch failed due to the dragons citing 4 years had only turned over £26,000. Terms of equity not broadcast. Company in liquidation as of 2023.		Liquidation (2023)
Episode 5	12 August 2009	James Nash	Wine Innovations Ltd	250,000	25	Single use wine goblets	Wine Innovations Ltd's pitch failed due to the dragons' concern that the product was easily replicated and Nash's inability to provide a clear letter of intent from potential buyers. Company went on to become one of the most successful businesses not to receive investment in the den and remains active.		Active
Episode 5	12 August 2009	Luke Porter	The Rebound Box	50,000	N/A	Football training accessory	The Rebound Box's pitch failed due to the dragons' belief that the market was limited and would not sell to a mass. Terms of equity not broadcast. Remains active.		Active
Episode 5	12 August 2009	Eser Taheary	N/A	100,000	N/A	Surveillance camera technology	Eser Taheary's pitch failed due to the dragons' concerns that the business lacked scalability. Terms of equity not broadcast.	N/A	N/A
Episode 6	19 August 2009	Samantha Gore	Saboteur Crime Prevention	120,000	10	Automatic curtain closing string box	Saboteur Crime Prevention's second pitch in the den failed due to the product malfunctioning during the pitch with the dragons citing it as 'flimsy,' whilst also being dismayed by Gore's attitude towards being helped. Dissolved by 2013.		Dissolved (2013)
Episode 6	19 August 2009	David Schofield	David Schofield	60,000	20	Debut self-titled classical album	David Schofield's pitch failed due to the dragons' belief that Schofield offering royalties to his work yet to be produced was under-selling his talent through the pitch. Remains active.		Active
Episode 6	19 August 2009	Jonathan Edwards	Mi Garden	100,000	N/A	Indoor green house	Mi Garden's pitch failed due to the dragons citing Edwards only had a letter of intent from a prospective buyer and no orders to date. Terms of equity not broadcast. Dissolved by 2010.	N/A	Dissolved (2010)
Episode 6	19 August 2009	Duncan Bardsley and Ian McCormick	Tin Bone Ltd	75,000	N/A	Football club themed toasters	Tin Bone Ltd's pitch failed due to the dragons' belief that the product was easily replicated and did not feature major football clubs. Terms of equity not broadcast. Dissolved by 2013.		Dissolved (2013)
Episode 6	19 August 2009	Ian Worton and Peter Neath	Grill Stream Ltd	120,000	15	Grill collecting excess fat	Grill Stream's pitch failed due to the dragons citing uncertainty over how the money would be invested and disbelief that the duo would reach the predicted net profit. Company in liquidation as of 2024.		Liquidation (2024)
Episode 6	19 August 2009	Nicky Povey	Kids Cooking Co	100,000	N/A	Children's cookware range	Kids Cooking Co's pitch failed due to the dragons' concern over the funding to start the business and lacked branding. Terms of equity not broadcast. Dissolved by 2013.		Dissolved (2013)
Episode 6	19 August 2009	Gareth Atkinson	Big Tow	60,000	N/A	Foldaway box trailer	Big Tow's pitch failed due to the dragons' concerns over the costs of manufacturing the product, possibly being too high to consider a return on an investment. Terms of equity not broadcast. Dissolved by 2011.	N/A	Dissolved (2011)
Episode 6	19 August 2009	Michael Oke	Bound Biographies	75,000	20	Life story biographies	Bound Biographies' pitch failed due to the dragons' concern over Oke's pricing strategy and potential accusations of intrusions into one's privacy. Remains active.		Active
Episode 6	19 August 2009	Russell Bowlby	Flights of Fantasy Creative Play	150,000	N/A	Luxury children's toys	Flights of Fantasy's pitch failed due to the dragons citing a high RRP of £28,000 and felt it would not sell to a mass market. Terms of equity not broadcast. Remains active.		Active
Episode 7	26 August 2009	Marios Evangelou	The Letterbox Guv'nor	50,000	N/A	Letterbox locking device	The Letterbox Guv'nor's pitch failed due to the dragons citing the device defied the point of having a letterbox. Terms of equity not broadcast. Dissolved by 2017.		Dissolved (2017)
Episode 7	26 August 2009	Martin Fisher	EP Paint Roller	100,000	N/A	Paint rollers with canister attached	EP Paint Roller's pitch failed due to the dragons citing difficulty in using the product and similar products already on the market. Terms of equity not broadcast.	N/A	N/A
Episode 7	26 August 2009	Stephen Voller	Bee Automobiles	2,500,000 £2.5 million was the highest sum ever pitched for at the time.	30	Electric automobiles	Bee Automobiles's pitch failed due to the dragons citing the car lacked unique features and believed the £10,000,000 startup cost to be futile. Dissolved by 2011.		Dissolved (2011)
Episode 7	26 August 2009	Susan and Audrey Boss	Beyond Chocolate	50,000	N/A	Lifestyle weight loss coaching website	Beyond Chocolate's pitch failed due to the dragons' belief the company was underfunded and had not generated interest despite wide marketing. Terms of equity not broadcast. Dissolved by 2025.		Dissolved (2025)
Episode 7	26 August 2009	Umar Mohammed and Ahmed Suleyman	One Dip	75,000	N/A	Curry snack boxes	One Dip's pitch failed due to the dragons citing the product was easily replicated and would not sell in mass volumes. Terms of equity not broadcast.	N/A	N/A
Episode 8	2 September 2009	Allen Holland and Steve Crosby	Quick Play Sport	100,000	N/A	Portable football goal posts	Quick Play Sport's pitch failed due to the dragons citing low sales and belief that the company did not have enough funds to launch. Terms of equity not broadcast. Remains active.		Active
Episode 8	2 September 2009	Vernon Kerswell	Extreme Fliers Toys	75,000	15	Remote control flying toys	Extreme Flies Toys' pitch failed due to the dragons citing difficulties over obtaining a patent and advising Kerswell to finish studying before progressing with the business. Remains active.		Active
Episode 8	2 September 2009	Joe Reade	Island Bakery	150,000	N/A	Organic biscuits bakery	Island Bakery's pitch failed due to the dragons citing rising costs of Reade's cost of expansion and subsequently deemed the investment as high risk as it depended on his sales. Terms of equity not broadcast. Remains active.		Active
Episode 8	2 September 2009	Gary Herriet and Tom Row	Spirit Cleaner	120,000	N/A	Recyclable cleaning spirit	Spirit Cleaner's pitch failed due to the dragons predicting low sales and citing developments in paint chemicals possibly rendering the product obsolete. Terms of equity not broadcast.	N/A	N/A
Episode 8	2 September 2009	Susan Bell and Jonathan Jones	Butterfly Technologies (Squeeze with Ease)	75,000	10	Aid for toothpaste tubes	Butterfly Technologies' pitch failed due to the dragons citing a key for tubes as more cost saving and eco-friendly. Dissolved by 2019.	N/A	Dissolved (2019)
Episode 8	2 September 2009	Brett Little and Edward Cryton	T.U.R.F (The Ultimate Racing Fraternity)	150,000	N/A	Shareholding in professional race horses	T.U.R.F 's pitch failed due to the dragons citing the product incentivised a diminishing return. Terms of equity not broadcast. Dissolved by 2013.		Dissolved (2013)
Episode 8	2 September 2009	Isaac Liloss and Hardvig Braun	Cityscapes	50,000	N/A	Cityscape designs for stationery and gift cards	Cityscapes' pitch failed due to the dragons citing low revenue and lack of scalability. Terms of equity not broadcast.	N/A	N/A

=== Series 8 ===
Episode	First aired	Entrepreneur(s)	Company or product name	Money requested (£)	Equity offered (%)	Description of product	Dragons reaction	Website	Fate
Episode 1	14 July 2010	Derek Cozens	Flow Signals	50,000	10	Light flash on a street traffic post	Flow Signals' pitch failed due to the dragons citing Cozens had no approval by law and did not trust that he had a patent. Remains active.		Active
Episode 1	14 July 2010	Bob and Robert Crib	ShedSafe	N/A	N/A	Shed security locks	ShedSafe's pitch failed due to the dragons breaking the lock with ease. Terms not broadcast. Remains active.		Active
Episode 1	14 July 2010	Amanda Fisher	Labels 4 Cables	50,000	N/A	Storage packets for cables	Labels 4 Cables' pitch failed due to the dragons' belief that the product was unattractive and would not sell to a mass market. Terms of equity not broadcast. Dissolved by 2010.	N/A	Dissolved (2010)
Episode 1	14 July 2010	Steven Noble	Latch Lead	60,000	N/A	Quick -release and attach dog lead	Latch Lead's pitch failed due to the dragons citing potential uncomfortability for the dogs and believed the product to be unattractive. Terms of equity not broadcast. Remains active.	N/A	N/A
Episode 1	14 July 2010	Nizzamul Chowdry	The Flex FX Enterprise	200,000	30	Bollywood dancing shows	The Flex FX Enterprise's pitch failed due to the dragons' concern that Chowdry had not made money in the past and could not produce clear answers on his sales to date. Dissolved by 2016.	N/A	Dissolved (2016)
Episode 1	14 July 2010	Dawn Pugsey	ToZo	50,000	N/A	Wearable folder for spectacles and sunglasses	ToZo's pitch failed due to the dragons citing Pugsey's lack of business drive and non-belief she would sell the product. Terms of equity not broadcast. Company was dissolved in 2016.		Dissolved (2016)
Episode 1	14 July 2010	Steve Foster and John Ainsley	Comprendo!(SJS Games)	100,000	N/A	Board game designed to teach languages	Comprendo!'s pitch failed due to the dragons citing low sales and predicted a low income for an investor. Terms of equity not broadcast. Dissolved by 2017.	N/A	Dissolved (2017)
Episode 2	21 July 2010	Roberts Leeds and Guy Seymore	Subeo	1,450,000	45	Submersive underwater vehicles	Subeo's pitch failed due to the dragons citing the valuation as double what the company was worth. Remains active.		Active
Episode 2	21 July 2010	Maninder Bamotra	M-Power Automatic Shaving Brush	60,000	N/A	Electric shaving brush	M-Power Automatic Shaving Brush's pitch failed due to the product malfunctioning on demonstration and the dragons' disbelief in the product selling to mass markets. Terms of equity not broadcast. Dissolved by 2010.	N/A	Dissolved (2010)
Episode 2	21 July 2010	Andrew Lang and Dominic Green	Inflatable Flood Barriers	75,000	N/A	Inflatable flood defence system	Inflatable Flood Barriers' pitch failed due to the dragons citing the product was untested. Terms of equity not broadcast.		Active
Episode2	21 July 2010	John Jackson	Easy Dry Housewares	80,000	25	Self-Rotating Washing Line	Easy Dry Housewares's pitch failed due to the dragons' concerns over manufacturing and installation costs. Dissolved by 2011.	N/A	Dissolved (2011)
Episode 2	21 July 2010	Jacqueline Cole	Make My Summer	75,000	N/A	Summer camp recruitment website	Make My Summer's pitch failed due to the dragons failing to cite how an investor would make a return on low fees being charged. Terms of equity not broadcast. Remains active.		Active
Episode 2	21 July 2010	Peter Springett	Little Yeller	80,000	N/A	Small alternative to megaphones	Little Yeller's pitch failed due to the dragons' concerns that a megaphone was more influential. Terms of equity not broadcast. Dissolved by 2019.	N/A	Dissolved (2019)
Episode 2	21 July 2010	Stuart Archbold and Andrew Leslie	Shopbox Systems Ltd	250,000	10	Outdoor storage box for food shopping	Shopbox Systems Ltd's pitch failed due to the dragons citing safety concerns and lack of negotiating on the amount of equity. Remains active.	N/A	Active
Episode 3	26 July 2010	Sam Petter	Tatty Bumpkin Shop	200,000	20	Organic and bamboo kids clothing	Tatty Bumpkin's pitch failed due to the dragons' belief that the branding lacked a clear message on the company's ethics. Remains active.		Active
Episode 3	26 July 2010	Chris Jones	Romancy Gram	50,000	N/A	Rentable portable four poster bed	Romancy gram's pitch failed due to the dragons citing the cost of hire and deemed the product's design unappealing. Terms of equity not broadcast. Remains active.	N/A	N/A
Episode 3	26 July 2010	Terry Merther	Ice Bar	250,000	25	Ice themed bar and nightclub	Ice Bar's pitch failed due to the dragons citing the business had no capital without investment and predicted financial difficulty going forward.		N/A
Episode 3	26 July 2010	Basil and Susan Doha	Bag a Book	50,000	N/A	Fashionable book bags	Bag a Book's pitch failed due to the dragons deeming the product unattractive and an uptake in electronic book readers possibly seeing it redundant in use. Terms of equity not broadcast. Remains active.		Active
Episode 3	26 July 2010	Guy Jeremiah	Aquatina (renamed OhYo)	100,000	10	Collapsible pocket-sized water bottle	Aquatina's pitch failed due to the dragons' belief that the bottle would not eradicate disposable plastic water bottles and had only turned over £702 to date. Remains active.		Active
Episode 3	26 July 2010	Janet and Neil Auldey	BoBo Woman	75,000	N/A	Multi look dresses	BoBo Woman's pitch failed due to the dragons feeling disillusioned with the concept of wearing the same dress continually and cited a long term repayment period. Terms of equity not broadcast. Dissolved by 2011.		Dissolved (2011)
Episode 3	26 July 2010	David Royce and Max Metcalfe	Cannonball Hammer	60,000	N/A	Cannonball attached to hammer for precision	Cannonball Hammer's pitch failed due to the dragons predicting low sales despite citing its innovative and usefulness. Terms of equity not broadcast.	N/A	N/A
Episode 4	2 August 2010	Barry and Tina Hemmings	Easy Over Egg Turner	50,000	N/A	2 in 1 spatula and spoon kitchen utensil	Easy Over Egg Turner's pitch failed due to the dragons citing the product as overpriced. Terms of equity not broadcast.	N/A	N/A
Episode 4	2 August 2010	Tony Young	Buzzgames	150,000	10	Football attached to spring pole	Buzzgames's pitch failed due to the dragons' disbelief in the product adequately substituting a normal football citing it had limited flexibility. Dissolved by 2011.	N/A	Dissolved (2011)
Episode 4	2 August 2010	Feisel Adams	Sq-easy Gloves	80,000	N/A	Glove attaching sponge and liquid	Sq-easy Gloves' pitch failed due to the dragons citing difficulty in removing the gloves and disbelief that the product would be deemed useful. Dissolved by 2011.		Dissolved (2011)
Episode 4	2 August 2010	Andrew Fussell	Fussels Fine Foods	65,000	N/A	Rapeseed oils and sauces	Fussels Fine Foods' pitch failed due to the dragons citing low revenues leading to no profit. Terms of equity not broadcast. Remains active.		Active
Episode 4	2 August 2010	Lisa Marshall and Shelene Mitchell	Blooming High	50,000	15	Plant stacking container with watering tube	Blooming High's pitch failed due to the dragons questioning their decision not to trade online and citing low revenue due to production costs. Remains active.		Dissolved (2022)
Episode 4	2 August 2010	Claire Charles	Vegan Shoe Boutique	100,000	N/A	Online vegan female shoe website	Vegan Shoe Boutique's pitch failed due to the dragons citing a loss of profit and fearing difficulty of trading shoes online. Terms of equity not broadcast.	N/A	N/A
Episode 5	9 August 2010	Paul Morris	Black Nut Iberian Pig Feed	100,000	20	Genetically modified foods for Black Iberian Pigs	Black Nut Iberian Pig Feed's pitch failed due to the dragons citing a lack of patenting and expenditure being higher than income. Dissolved by 2021.	N/A	Dissolved (2021)
Episode 5	9 August 2010	Essan	Gym in a Box	54,000	N/A	Chair with exercise tools attached	Gym in a Box's pitch failed due to the dragons citing the high manufacturing cost and the amount of unsold stock. Terms of equity not broadcast.	N/A	N/A
Episode 5	9 August 2010	Gavin Oaks and Alan Burton	Tree of Knowledge	100,000	10	Motivational teaching programmes	Tree of Knowledge's pitch failed due to the dragons' belief that the company was overvalued. Remains active.		Active
Episode 5	9 August 2010	Sharon Boscurt	Alexa Salt	75,000	N/A	Pink Himalayan crystal salt	Alexa Salt's pitch failed due to the dragons’ distaste for the product and citing the cost as double the average price. Terms of equity not broadcast.	N/A	N/A
Episode 5	9 August 2010	Charlie Mylonas and Guy Nottingham	The Fisheazy Autorest	60,000	N/A	Automated pole rest for fishermen	The Fisheazy Autorest's pitch failed due to the dragons' belief that the product defeated the purpose of fishing and declined to offer the investment for marketing which they believed could be done for free. Terms of equity not broadcast. Dissolved by 2012.	N/A	Dissolved (2012)
Episode 5	9 August 2010	Steven Mitchell and Michael Ehrenreich	Zigo	225,000	6	Multi-purpose carrier bike	Zigo's pitch failed due to the dragons citing a loss of profit similar to the amount pitched for and subsequently cited the valuation to be extreme. Remains active in America.		Active
Episode 5	9 August 2010	Reverend John Berriman	Reverend Berriman's	75,000	N/A	Spicy fizzy cola range	Reverend Berriman's pitch failed due to the dragons’ distaste of the product whilst also lacking belief it was worthy of investment. Terms of equity not broadcast. Remains active.	N/A	Active
Episode 5	16 August 2010	Glenn and Steven Hardman	Ecosense	100,000	N/A	Sensor for air conditioning controls	Ecosense's pitch failed due to the dragons citing Hardman's lack of knowledge on their profits and felt aiming the product towards the holiday market would not produce a return. Terms of equity not broadcast. Remains active.		Active
Episode 6	16 August 2010	Steven Mahar	Breakout (Firefly Safety Ltd)	75,000	N/A	Emergency glass breaking device	Breakout's pitch failed due to the dragons citing safety concerns over the ease of accidental usage and possible burglary. Terms of equity not broadcast. Remains active.		Active
Episode 6	16 August 2010	Jacqueline McKay	Angel Cot	150,000	40	Multi-use baby crib	Angel Cot's pitch failed due to the dragons' belief that the product was over engineered and a burden to carry. Dissolved by 2011.		Dissolved (2011)
Episode 6	16 August 2010	Daniel Bayley-Taylor	Pizza Ball	50,000	N/A	Metallic ball for making pizza dough bases	Pizza Ball's pitch failed due to the dragons' belief that the product was not suitable for investment due to the RRP. Terms of equity not broadcast.		N/A
Episode 6	16 August 2010	Terry and David Ward	Cover Fit	90,000	N/A	Post surgery cover blanket for dogs	Cover Fit's pitch failed due to the dragons' belief that most dogs would not respond well to it whilst the Ward's had no feedback to date from veterinarians. Terms of equity not broadcast.	N/A	N/A
Episode 6	16 August 2010	Graham Downey and Phil Morrison	Advanced Building Design Ltd (Plumbing Tools)	89,000	15	Clamps for radiator maintenance	Advanced Building Design Ltd's pitch failed due to the dragons citing lack of interest from distributors and believing though the products were useful they wouldn't sell to a mass market. Remains active.		Active
Episode 6	16 August 2010	Sarah Orecchia	Bee Prepared (Unbeelievable Health)	75,000	N/A	Supplement extracts from bee propolis, black elderberry, olive leaf and beta glucans	Bee Prepared's pitch failed due to the dragons citing Orecchia's lack of research on the product's health benefits. Terms of equity not broadcast. Remains active.		Active
Episode 6	16 August 2010	Graham and Sue Wright	Artitus Marine	50,000	N/A	Mast climbing device for sailing boats	Artitus Marine's pitch failed due to the dragons questioning the demand for sailors climbing a mast and subsequently felt it would not appeal to a mass market. Terms of equity not broadcast. Dissolved by 2025.		Dissolved (2025)
Episode 7	24 August 2010	Simon Jamieson and Allan Brown	Gift Card Converter	50,000	25	Website to buy/exchange gift cards	Gift Card Converter's pitch failed due to the dragons' belief that many companies would adapt their terms and conditions so that they could not be exchanged and that upon selling the vouchers they would decrease in value. Dissolved by 2014.		Dissolved (2014)
Episode 7	24 August 2010	Alastair Heelas	The Giant Snow Globe	180,000	N/A	Winter themed attraction	The Giant Snow Globe's pitch failed due to the dragons citing Heelas could not produce his sales projections and subsequently could not justify his valuation. Terms of equity not broadcast. Remains active.		Active
Episode 7	24 August 2010	Ian and Karen Moakes	Sqeasy	N/A	N/A	Device removing all contents from sachets	Sqeasy's pitch failed due to the dragons' belief that the product's RRP would not produce a sufficient return on the investment. Terms of equity not broadcast. Dissolved by 2011.		Dissolved (2011)
Episode 7	24 August 2010	Matthias Luethi	Life Science Services	150,000	N/A	Collapsable silent wind turbine	Life Science Services's pitch failed due to the dragons citing the product was not fully tested and subsequently had little feedback on whether it worked adequately. Terms of equity not broadcast. Dissolved by 2010.		Dissolved (2010)
Episode 7	24 August 2010	Sarah McClean and Sandy Maxwell-Forbes	Citidogs Creche	75,000	20	Dog day centre	Citidogs Creche's pitch failed due to Forbes and McClean failure to state profit forecasts and the dragons citing they were not registered for VAT despite revenue of over £150,000. Remains active.		Active
Episode 7	24 August 2010	Jeremy Fry and Marta Podhorski-Okolow	Wave Cave	90,000	N/A	Surfboard with tent attachment	Wave Cave's pitch failed due to the dragons' belief that the product would sell enough to produce a return on the investment. Terms of equity not broadcast. Dissolved by 2011.	N/A	Dissolved (2011)
Episode 7	24 August 2010	Christopher and Andrea Rai	Chapati Man	50,000	N/A	Range of Indian chapati wraps	Chapati Man's pitch failed due to the dragons fear that upon the product being branded, the Rai's would lose their current distribution deals with supermarkets and felt the company needed more money than pitched for. Terms of equity not broadcast. Remains active.		Active
Episode 8	31 August 2010	Diane White and Kalvinder Bhullar	The Yum Yums (Di Med Publishing)	100,000	20	Children's books characters based on fruits and vegetables	The Yum Yums's pitch failed due to the dragons' belief the books were in an overcrowded market and cited grammatical inconsistencies with the characters. Dissolved by 2012.	N/A	Dissolved (2012)
Episode 8	31 August 2010	Michael Hamilton	Commando Joe's Fun and Fitness	50,000	N/A	Military style fitness classes for children	Commando Joe's pitch failed due to the dragons citing a lack of references from organisations, schools and parents to gain enough feedback for investment. Terms of equity not broadcast. Remains active.		Active
Episode 8	31 August 2010	Philippa Stephen-Martin	Spoton Shades	50,000	N/A	Shades for spot-lighting	Spoton Shades' pitch failed due to the dragons' dislike of the product whilst questioning her belief in the product. Terms of equity not broadcast. Dissolved by 2012.	N/A	Dissolved (2012)
Episode 8	31 August 2010	Stanley Wallace	The Parcel Office	250,000	N/A	Excess luggage and parcel delivery	The Parcel Office's pitch failed due to the dragons' belief that the market was too difficult for Wallace to get into despite investment and cited annual profit losses. Terms of equity not broadcast. Company was dissolved in 2015.		Dissolved (2015)
Episode 8	31 August 2010	Patrick Smythe and Tim Hurst	Odourbuster (Air Away)	75,000	15	Toilet fitting for bathroom pipe cleaning	Odourbuster's pitch failed due to the dragons' belief that the product would not sell as many units as predicted whilst also citing similar products already on the market. Remains active.		Dissolved (2011)
Episode 8	31 August 2010	John French	Paintapron	70,000	N/A	Box attached to harness to aid DIY	Paintapron's pitch failed due to the dragons' disbelief that the product would reach a mass market. Terms of equity not broadcast. Remains active.	N/A	Active
Episode 8	31 August 2010	Michael Dreige, Catherine Vanier and Rory McClane	Temporary housing	130,000	N/A	Temporary housing for homes and schools	Temporary housing's pitch failed due to the dragons citing an expensive build cost possibly twice as much as first pitched. Terms of equity not broadcast.	N/A	N/A
Episode 9	6 September 2010	Keith & Chris Hamilton	Sweat Sportz	100,000	10	Sports vest aiding weight loss	Sweat Sportz's pitch failed due to the dragons' belief that the vest was easily replicated and cited low net profits, failing to justify the Hamilton's two year repayment offer. Dissolved by 2012.	N/A	Dissolved (2012)
Episode 9	6 September 2010	John Buni	TailorMade	75,000	10	3D body-scanning for clothes measurements	TailorMade's pitch failed due to the dragons' belief that the device offered no design or material recommendations whilst also citing concerns over the cost of the device. Remains active.		Active
Episode 10	13 September 2010	Adam Phillips	My Babiie ltd	100,000	10	Buggy that incorporates a changing table	My Babiie's pitch failed due to the dragons' concerns over who owned the patents and whether Phillips actually owned the company. Terms of equity not broadcast. Company was dissolved in 2018, however relisted in 2019 and remains active.		Active
Episode 10	13 September 2010	John and Celina Edwards	Mobile Sentry	80,000	N/A	Website tracking children's activity on mobile phones	Mobile Sentry's pitch failed due to the dragons lack of belief that the model worked and that major companies would not integrate their product particularly. Terms of equity not broadcast. Dissolved by 2014.		Dissolved (2014)
Episode 10	13 September 2010	Anthony Curtis	Alago	110,000	N/A	Heated glove for playing rugby	Alago's pitch failed due to the dragons citing similar products already on the market and fear it would not return an investment. Terms of equity not broadcast. Remains active.		Active
Episode 10	13 September 2010	Jessica Ratcliffe	GaBoom	60,000	11	Website to exchange computer games	GaBoom's pitch failed due to the dragons' concerns over the cost of physically housing the stock and mixing the physical and virtual in an online business. Dissolved by 2013.		Dissolved (2013)
Episode 10	13 September 2010	Carl Myer	The Defender	100,000	N/A	Security tracking device for cars	The Defender's pitch failed due to the dragons citing Myer's lack of knowledge on what fitting services would cost as well as realistic expectations of catching car thieves. Terms of equity not broadcast.	N/A	N/A
Episode 10	13 September 2010	Gavin and Susan Naismith	Picture Case Ltd	80,000	N/A	Branding for luggage and suitcases	Picture Case Ltd's pitch failed due to the dragons citing an already healthy profit and not citing a need for an investor. Terms of equity not broadcast. Dissolved by 2019.		Dissolved (2019)

=== Series 9 ===
Episode	First aired	Entrepreneur(s)	Company or product name	Money requested (£)	Equity offered (%)	Description of product	Dragons reaction	Website	Fate
Episode 1	31 July 2011	George Winter	Egglu	50,000	N/A	Plastic ball preventing splashback in toilets	Egglu's pitch failed due to the dragons' disbelief that the product would prevent splashback. Terms of equity not broadcast. Dissolved by 2020.		Dissolved (2020)
Episode 1	31 July 2011	Alan Sharrock	Miruji Health	100,000	10	Massage chair combined mind coaching audios	Miruji Health's pitch failed due to the dragons citing no official medical reviews confirming that the product helped one lose weight and Sharrock's lack of knowledge on his numbers. Dissolved by 2019.	N/A	Dissolved (2019)
Episode 1	31 July 2011	Alison Kedge	WarmaHorn	50,000	N/A	Neoprene sleeve to keep brass instruments warm	WarmaHorn's pitch failed due to the dragons' belief Kedge was in a limited market with outdoor instruments and an overall dislike of the product. Terms of equity not broadcast. Dissolved by 2014.		Dissolved (2014)
Episode 1	31 July 2011	Rodrigo and Lois Perez	Human Cannonball	34,000	10	Human cannonball entertainment	Human Cannonball's pitch failed due to the dragons' belief that the business would not return an investment as the market would be restricted and felt the risk of injury would be a constant worry.		N/A
Episode 1	31 July 2011	Paul Watts	Dust Elimin8	50,000	N/A	Device alleviating dust from building tools	Dust Elimin8's pitch failed due to the dragons citing low sales and a small target market. Terms of equity not broadcast. Remains active.		N/A
Episode 1	31 July 2011	Nola Baldwin	Gloven	75,000	N/A	Flexible oven gloves	Gloven's pitch failed due to the dragons citing similar products on the market and believed it would not return an investment. Terms of equity not broadcast. Dissolved by 2018.		Dissolved (2018)
Episode 2	7 August 2011	Krissy Sims and Kerry O'Brian	The British DJ and MC Academy	150,000	20	Mobile music facilities for DJs	The British DJ and MC Academy's pitch failed due to the dragons' belief that the product lacked longevity and would not return an investment. Remains active.		Active
Episode 2	7 August 2011	John McMonagle	Karnap	125,000	N/A	Inflatable car bed	Karnap's pitch failed due to the dragons' belief that it would not sell in vast numbers and cited uncomfortability. Terms of equity not broadcast. Remains active.		Active
Episode 2	7 August 2011	Safiya Hussain	NoParkingFine	50,000	N/A	Website challenging parking fines	NoParkingFine's pitch failed due to the dragons citing people would still pay half of the parking fine and not have it fully alleviated. Terms of equity not broadcast. Dissolved by 2014.	N/A	Dissolved (2014)
Episode 2	7 August 2011	Glen Harden	UV Body Sculpture	50,000	20	Skin tanning aid via ultraviolet technology	UV Body Sculpture's pitch failed due to the dragons' disbelief in the RRP and believed Harden lacked the drive in marketing the product. The product does not appear to have made it to market, however Harden's parent company mentioned in the pitch remains active.		Active
Episode 2	7 August 2011	Alan Clark	Kralk Audio	70,000	N/A	Bluetooth speaker integrated into bath tubs	Kralk Audio's pitch failed due to the dragons citing safety issues and a high RRP. Terms of equity not broadcast. Remains active.		Active
Episode 2	7 August 2011	Elizabeth Chance and Colin Halfpenny	Dog Bling	50,000	N/A	Fashion accessories for dogs	Dog Bling's pitch failed due to the dragons’ overall dislike of the accessories and cited no turnover to date. Terms of equity not broadcast.		N/A
Episode 3	14 August 2011	Tricia Tierney, Tim and Meena Kalia	The Rascal Dog Letterbox	75,000	20	Litter trays for dogs	The Rascal Dog Letterbox's pitch failed due to the dragons citing a third-party product was required for the litter trays to operate and would stop dogs from going outside to litter. Dissolved by 2019.	N/A	Dissolved (2019)
Episode 3	14 August 2011	Daniel Thompson	UKGC	N/A	45	All you can drink private members club	UKGC's pitch failed due to the dragons citing the company promoting addictive drinking. The sum of money requested was not broadcast. Dissolved by 2011.	N/A	Dissolved (2011)
Episode 3	14 August 2011	Leon Lee	ICV Technology	100,000	10	Weight loss clothing	ICV Technology's pitch failed due to the dragons citing the product as discouraging people to go to the gym and naturally adjust their physique whilst also ridiculing the valuation.	N/A	N/A
Episode 3	14 August 2011	Aleksandar Tomic	Philharmonic Lights	80,000	25	Theatrical portable wireless lights	Philharmonic Lights' pitch failed due to the dragons' concern over the essential use of fixed lighting and cited similar products were cheaper and already on the market. Dissolved by 2019.		Dissolved (2019)
Episode 3	14 August 2011	Justin Potter	N/A	50,000	N/A	Cover protection for filling hot water bottles	Justin Potter's pitch failed due to the dragons' belief he would not sell to a mass market. The name of the company nor terms of equity requested were broadcast.	N/A	N/A
Episode 3	14 August 2011	Rachel and Carmen John	Extreme Textiles	100,000	N/A	Extreme knitwear	Extreme Textiles's pitch failed due to the dragons citing the product had been in production for many years whilst believing retailers would develop their own brands as opposed to using the company. Terms of equity not broadcast. Dissolved by 2014.		Dissolved (2014)
Episode 4	21 August 2011	Camilla Shaughnessy	Eventful Stays	240,000	N/A	Online private accommodation agency	Eventful Stays' pitch failed due to the dragons citing major losses in profit and felt Camilla would not meet her expected forecasts. Terms of equity not broadcast. Dissolved by 2019.		Dissolved (2019)
Episode 4	21 August 2011	Fraser Allen	My Sea Safe	150,000	5	Detachable safe for sun loungers	My Sea Safe's pitch failed due to the dragons' belief that the product was easily stolen and the company over-valued. Terms of equity not broadcast. Dissolved by 2016.		Dissolved (2016)
Episode 4	21 August 2011	Sampson Dukabyagbena	Steam controlled shaving aid	190,000	N/A	Steam controlled shaving aid	Steam controlled shaving aid's pitch failed due to the dragons' disbelief that the product was an adequate replacement for contemporary shaving kits. Terms of equity not broadcast.	N/A	N/A
Episode 4	21 August 2011	Marcela Flores Newburn and Tim Sutton	Rico Mexican Kitchen	75,000	20	Range of Mexican foods	Rico Mexican Kitchen's pitch failed due to the dragons citing low sales and lacking a strong brand. Dissolved by 2013.		Dissolved (2013)
Episode 4	21 August 2011	Chris O'Connell	Pro Slope	75,000	N/A	Artificial ski-matting business	Pro Slope's pitch failed due to the dragons citing lack of feedback on the product and doubted it would serve as a useful aid. Terms of equity not broadcast. Dissolved by 2023.		Dissolved (2023)
Episode 4	21 August 2011	Shirley and Hayley Smith	Pots and Pancakes	50,000	N/A	Ceramics cafe	Pots and Pancakes' pitch failed due to the dragons' belief that the business was too small to consider investment. Terms of equity not broadcast. Remains active.		Active
Episode 5	28 August 2011	Darren Maddison and Helen Wright	Polkadot Pantomimes	100,000	20	Classic British pantomimes	Polkadot Pantomimes' pitch failed due to the dragons' concern over the valuation with business yet to turn a profit and felt the company didn't need the investment with projected figures. Remains active.		Active
Episode 5	28 August 2011	Paul Da-Costa-Greaves	Feeding Your Imagination	50,000	N/A	Range of chocolate bars	Feeding Your Imagination's pitch failed due to the dragons citing major losses and felt the range to be too broad. Terms of equity not broadcast. Dissolved by 2022.		Dissolved (2022)
Episode 5	28 August 2011	George Allen	Flaggo!	50,000	N/A	Board-game flying by country to spell Flaggo!	Flaggo!'s pitch failed due to the dragons citing lack of feedback and responses from toy stores. Terms of equity not broadcast. Dissolved by 2014.		Dissolved (2014)
Episode 5	28 August 2011	Steven Myburgh	Myburgh Designs	70,000	20	Garden copper furniture	Myburgh Designs's pitch failed due to the dragons citing high RRP's and felt Myburgh lacked business drive. Dissolved by 2019.		Dissolved (2019)
Episode 5	28 August 2011	Phillip Hall	WingAware	75,000	N/A	Safety indication for car's distance from wing mirrors	WingAware's pitch failed due to the dragons' belief that the product was feeble in stopping cars from travelling close to cars and lacked interest in sales. Terms of equity not broadcast. Dissolved by 2012.		Dissolved (2012)
Episode 5	28 August 2011	Jacqueline Williams and Gerald Parker	Baskit Geni	50,000	N/A	Anti-theft device for gardeners	Baskit Geni pitch failed due to the dragons citing the ease of replication and custom methods already in use. Terms of equity not broadcast. Remains active.		Dissolved (2017)
Episode 6	4 September 2011	Karen and Jo-Chan Ho	Aqua Sheko Fish Spa	150,000	30	Fish tank pedicure	Aqua Sheko Fish Spa's pitch failed due to the dragons' concern over exporting and trade of live animals and lacked copyright protection. Dissolved by 2012.		Dissolved (2012)
Episode 6	4 September 2011	Scott Robert Shaw and Lee Collison-James	Skip-Hop	100,000	N/A	Skipping rope	Skip-Hop's pitch failed due to the dragons citing a lack of uniqueness towards the product and the duo's inability to justify the valuation. Terms of equity not broadcast. Dissolved by 2013.		Dissolved (2013)
Episode 6	4 September 2011	Alun Pearson	N-Sign	100,000	10	Signage and engraving company	N-Sign's pitch failed due to the dragons citing lack of clarity as to why Pearson wanted to take the product pitched out of N-Sign and struggled to predict his forecast of profits. Remains active.		Active
Episode 6	4 September 2011	Jonathan Caplan	Poker Controls	275,000	N/A	Joystick for poker gaming consoles	Poker Controls' pitch failed due to the dragons citing Caplan's previous failed business ventures and concerns that the product did not appeal to a mass market. Terms of equity not broadcast. Dissolved by 2014.		Dissolved (2014)
Episode 6	4 September 2011	Polly and Charlotte Vickery	Brat and Suzie	65,000	20	Fashionable animal clothing range	Brat and Suzie's pitch failed due to the dragons' concern over the ease of replicating and lack of branding. Dissolved by 2016.		Dissolved (2016)
Episode 6	4 September 2011	Michelle Smith	StickiButt	80,000	N/A	Harness and seatbelt accessory for motorcycles	StickiButt's pitch failed due to the dragons' concern that the market was niche. Terms of equity not broadcast. Dissolved by 2021.	N/A	Dissolved (2021)
Episode 6	4 September 2011	David Baker	Crocodile Keyboard	150,000	10	Touchpad keyboard with triangular outlay	Crocodile Keyboard's pitch failed due to the dragons citing a crowded marketplace and the company's low turnover. Dissolved by 2014.		Dissolved (2014)
Episode 7	12 September 2011	Jacqui Thompson	Pulse	50,000	N/A	Police-themed educational workshops	Pulse's pitch failed due to the dragons citing a low net profit indicating a long term repayment. Terms of equity not broadcast. Remains active.		Active
Episode 7	12 September 2011	Orobola Lafe	Opus Innovations Ltd	50,000	10	Children's nasal accessories	Opus Innovations Ltd's pitch failed due to the dragons citing major net losses and not being convinced that the company would turn a profit. Remains active.		Active
Episode 7	12 September 2011	Paul Blair	Safestix	80,000	N/A	Wooden sticks for dogs	Safestix's pitch failed due to the dragons' belief that Blair had invested too much money in manufacturing as opposed to relying on royalties. Terms of equity not broadcast. Remains active.		Active
Episode 7	12 September 2011	Wendy Thompson	Health Swing	50,000	40	Rehabilitation exercise device	Health Swing's pitch failed due to the dragons' disbelief in it being used at home, although Devey recommended Thompson to health centres to focus on the market for rehabilitation.	N/A	N/A
Episode 7	12 September 2011	Gareth and Brian Smith	Crips	250,000	10	Low fat snack crisps	Crips' pitch failed due to the dragons citing major profits losses over 2 years and subsequently ridiculing the company's valuation.	N/A	N/A
Episode 7	12 September 2011	Ian Wilson	Wind-E-Lite	50,000	N/A	Fan power bicycle light	Wind-E-Lite's pitch failed due to the dragons citing a high RRP and concerns that Wilson was not maximising the product's potential on sources of power via cycling. Terms of equity not broadcast. The product does not appear to have been followed through, however Wilson's parent company remains active.	N/A	Active
Episode 8	19 September 2011	Yasmin Hussain	Trinamic balls	65,000	N/A	In-car accessory dance ball	Trinamic balls' pitch failed due to the dragons' belief the product was easily replicated and lacked longevity. Terms of equity not broadcast.		N/A
Episode 8	19 September 2011	Richard Williams and Gil Ostrander	Realtor Network Limited	50,000	20	Online real estate agency	Realtor Network Limited's pitch failed due to the dragons citing the profits being split across multiple estate agents and likely to fail in generating a healthy margin in profit. Dissolved by 2021.		Dissolved (2021)
Episode 8	19 September 2011	Mark Shaw	Haggis Dog	50,000	N/A	Spiced haggis dish	Haggis Dog's pitch failed due to the dragons citing the ease of replicating the product and disbelief that it would sell multiple a day. Terms of equity not broadcast. Dissolved by 2011.		Dissolved (2011)
Episode 8	19 September 2011	Michelle and Steve Ellis	FatPhRocks	60,000	30	Female clothes and underwear range	FatPhRocks' pitch failed due to the dragons citing potential challenges of their claim for a patent over cloth clothing and concerns over low profit margins. Remains active.		Active
Episode 8	19 September 2011	Jim Jamieson	Easylegs Automotive	80,000	N/A	Supporting legs for lorry trailers	Easylegs Automotive's pitch failed due to the dragons citing lack of clarity over whether telescopic supporting legs were already on the market and stating he may have received investment had he pitched for £25,000. Terms of equity not broadcast. Dissolved by 2013.	N/A	Dissolved (2013)
Episode 8	19 September 2011	Marion Mainstone	Flip It Sales	200,000	N/A	Foldaway furniture	Flip It Sales' pitch failed due to the dragons citing that Mainstone would have to pay royalties upon sales as she did not own the patent. Terms of equity not broadcast. Dissolved by 2019.	N/A	Dissolved (2019)
Episode 9	26 September 2011	Michelle Savage	Savvylash	50,000	20	Eyelash beauty product	Savvylash's pitch failed due to the dragons' belief that the product lacked viability and were concerned Savage had not taken the product to market before attempting to develop further. Terms of equity not broadcast. Remains active.		Active
Episode 9	26 September 2011	John Richardson	Richibrown Organic Botox	75,000	N/A	All-natural anti-ageing product	Richibrown Organic Botox's pitch failed due to the dragons citing the product's lack of visible results and Richardson's lack of scientific research into the product. Terms of equity not broadcast. Dissolved by 2018.	N/A	Dissolved (2018)
Episode 9	26 September 2011	Julian Lipton	The Nuttery	100,000	15	Bird feeding cage	The Nuttery's pitch failed due to the dragons citing The Nuttery's net value below zero and were not convinced of predicted profit. Dissolved by 2018.		Dissolved (2018)
Episode 9	26 September 2011	Fraser Sinnott	Mall Mobility	120,000	N/A	Self-service coin-operated mobility service	Mall Mobility's pitch failed due to the dragons citing only one supermarket had shown interest and felt the company would need more money to launch the service. Terms of equity not broadcast. Dissolved by 2014.	N/A	Dissolved (2014)
Episode 9	26 September 2011	Nathan Pearson	Romeo Products Ltd	50,000	25	Outdoor shelving system	Romeo Products Ltd's pitch failed due to the dragons citing current shareholders have invested less money for the same amount of equity pitched for and cited low orders. Dissolved by 2014.	N/A	Dissolved (2014)
Episode 9	26 September 2011	William Dolman and Keith Matthews	The Dolman Cobra Plug Socket	150,000	N/A	Plug and plug socket with ease of insert and removal	The Dolman Cobra Plug Socket's pitch failed due to the dragons' disbelief that many would consider changing their plug sockets to suit the need. Terms of equity not broadcast. Dissolved by 2013.	N/A	Dissolved (2013)
Episode 9	26 September 2011	Rob Beresford and Emma Kennedy	Crowdity	200,000	N/A	Group buying website	Crowdity's pitch failed due to the dragons' belief that the investment would be quickly spent and would soon need more to keep afloat. Terms of equity not broadcast. Company is in liquidation as of 2022.		Liquidation (2022)
Episode 10	3 October 2011	James Eadon and Chris Ollivier	Culica Limited	80,000	10	Game where peg colours combinations win	Culica Limited's pitch failed due to the dragons' disbelief that the product would sell to a mass market and were concerned over the duo's lack of knowledge regarding the distributor they were using. Dissolved by 2019.		Dissolved (2019)
Episode 10	3 October 2011	Rob Forde and Dr John Blenkinsopp	Medicines Direct	75,000	N/A	Telephone ordering of long-term prescriptions	Medicines Direct's pitch failed due to the dragons citing that the company only had one GP practice signed up to the service and advised them to look for investment after gaining more. Terms of equity not broadcast. Dissolved by 2014.		Dissolved (2014)
Episode 10	3 October 2011	Rory and Jacqui	The Optathlon	50,000	N/A	Exercise courses based on racing against time	The Optathlon's pitch failed due to the dragons citing the product could not be patented and disbelief that the system would encourage people to go to the gym. Terms of equity not broadcast.	N/A	N/A
Episode 10	3 October 2011	Tim Smith	Redfoot Shoes	300,000	10	Men and women's footwear	Redfoot Shoes' pitch failed due to the dragons' concerns over the losses suffered in previous years affecting potential net profits in the future and required more proof of sustainability before considering investment. Remains active.		Active
Episode 10	3 October 2011	Malory Maltby	Wallthru Limited	50,000	20	A wheel shaped handle	Malory Maltby's pitch failed due to the dragons' concerns that Maltby would not discuss his patents and felt his products were little different to those already on the market. Dissolved by 2018.	N/A	Dissolved (2018)
Episode 10	3 October 2011	Kenneth Cheung	Wigglepod	50,000	N/A	Educational recycling products	Wigglepod's pitch failed due to the dragons citing the investment to be greater than the company's turnover. Terms of equity not broadcast. Remains active.		Active
Episode 10	3 October 2011	Karen Chapman	Squibble Don't Squabble	75,000	N/A	Games solving small arguments	Squibble Don't Squabble's pitch failed due to the dragons' disbelief that the product solved any issues and felt her profit margins to be too low. Terms of equity not broadcast. Dissolved by 2010.		Dissolved (2010)

=== Series 10 ===
Episode	First aired	Entrepreneur(s)	Company or product name	Money requested (£)	Equity offered (%)	Description of product	Dragons reaction	Website	Fate
Episode 1	9 September 2012	Colin and Yelena Goddard	SmartMat	50,000	N/A	Travel mat with detachable towel	SmartMat's pitch failed due to the dragons’ dissatisfaction that the detachable towel was the only unique selling point. Terms of equity not broadcast. Remains active.	N/A	Dissolved (2024)
Episode 1	9 September 2012	Adam Ewart	Sendmybag	100,000	5	Delivery service for luggage excess	Sendmybag's pitch failed due to the dragons citing services already on the market and Ewarts refusal to go over 7%. Remains active.		Active
Episode 1	9 September 2012	Harriet Thomas and Sue Newman	Boogie Mites	50,000	N/A	Music for early years childcare practitioners	Boogie Mites' pitch failed due to the dragons citing the ease of copying and failing to see any unique selling points besides the music. Terms of equity not broadcast. Remains active.		Active
Episode 1	9 September 2012	Clay O'Shea	AbsPak	50,000	25	Portable muscle-building device	AbsPak's pitch failed due to the dragons citing O'Shea could not obtain a patent and concerns over similar products already being on the market. Dissolved by 2013.		Dissolved (2013)
Episode 1	9 September 2012	Osman Gulum	Flower Fountain	N/A	N/A	Petals and confetti air launching device	Flower Fountain's pitch failed due to the dragons' disbelief that the product created a creative display and whether Gulum would obtain a patent. Terms not broadcast. Dissolved by 2015.	N/A	Dissolved (2015)
Episode 1	9 September 2012	Patricia Gruchy and Louise Villalon	2 Chickens And A House	45,000	N/A	Residential chicken egg laying service	2 Chickens And A House's pitch failed due to the dragons' disbelief that the product would sell to a mass market. Terms of equity not broadcast. Dissolved by 2017.		Dissolved (2017)
Episode 2	16 September 2012	Vicki Edmunds	Eat With A Local	50,000	15	Local house-cooking meet-up website	Eat With A Local's pitch failed due to the dragons' concerns over whether the £50,000 would be enough to launch the company, whilst Edmunds stated she would not negotiate higher than 50%. Dissolved by 2025.		Dissolved (2025)
Episode 2	16 September 2012	Gordon MacSween	Captive Media Ltd	250,000	N/A	Video game controlled by urinating on a toilet	Captive Media's pitch failed due to the dragons' disbelief that the product would sell to a mass market. Terms of equity not broadcast. Dissolved by 2017.	N/A	Dissolved (2017)
Episode 2	16 September 2012	Yusuf Chadun and Shazia Mustafa	Third Door Workhub and Nursery	120,000	20	Flexible parent working day care nursery	Third Door Workhub and Nursery's pitch failed due to the dragons citing major net losses and the company's lack of knowledge on their finances. Dissolved in 2022.		Dissolved (2022)
Episode 2	16 September 2012	Gwen Bailey, Dr Patrick Handley, Graham Morgan	Pawsonality	125,000	N/A	Personality test for dogs	Pawsonality's pitch failed due to the dragons' concern over the confusion over whether dog owners would find the product confusing or . Terms of equity not broadcast. Dissolved by 2020.		Dissolved (2020)
Episode 2	16 September 2012	Andy Robertson	Dirty Beach	100,000	10	Furniture built from sand	Dirty Beach's pitch failed due to the dragons citing low profits and subsequently ridiculed the valuation. Remains active, however it does not appear to have been listed.		Active
Episode 2	16 September 2012	Nikki Hesford	Fast-fashion	50,000	N/A	Female range of lingerie clothing, swimwear	Fast-fashion's pitch failed due to the dragons' disbelief that the company would turnover Hesford's expected profits. Terms of equity not broadcast. Dissolved by 2012 although Hesford officially ceased trading in 2015.		Dissolved (2015)
Episode 2	16 September 2012	Al Campbell and Gerard Dare	N/A	75,000	N/A	On-board exercise device to prevent Deep Vein Thrombosis	Al Campbell and Gerard Dare's pitch failed due to the dragons' disbelief that the product made a difference. Company name nor terms of equity requested were broadcast.	N/A	N/A
Episode 3	23 September 2012	Andrew Hannon	13horror Ltd	50,000	20	Online interactive horror games	13horror Ltd's pitch failed due to the dragons' disbelief that they would make a return on their investment and they struggled to understand Hannon's business model. Dissolved by 2015.		Dissolved (2015)
Episode 3	23 September 2012	John Power	Jaktogo	100,000	N/A	Wearable coat for luggage excess	Jaktogo's pitch failed due to the dragons citing travellers would be paying an excess luggage charge nonetheless as the jacket would classify as overweight for travel. Terms of equity not broadcast. Remains active.	N/A	Active
Episode 3	23 September 2012	Sam Lanyon	Auto Wed	100,000	N/A	Machine producing gimmicked wedding certificates	Auto Wed's pitch failed due to the dragons' belief that the product would not sell to a mass market. Terms of equity not broadcast. Dissolved by 2013.	N/A	Dissolved (2013)
Episode 3	23 September 2012	Matthew Conridge	Mamka	200,000	10	Online retail	Mamka's pitch failed due to the dragons citing low net profits and ridiculing the valuation. Terms of equity not broadcast. Dissolved by 2016.		Dissolved (2016)
Episode 3	23 September 2012	Trevor Joy	Sawsafe	80,000	N/A	Safety device for use of saws	Sawsafe's pitch failed due to the dragons' belief that Joy needed to gain more attraction from DIY stores. Terms of equity not broadcast.		Dissolved (2010)
Episode 3	23 September 2012	Malgorzata and Dorota	Aqua Miracle exercising pool	77,000	N/A	Pool for exercising	Aqua Miracle's pitch failed due to the dragons' belief that the product was basic and would not attract exercise models. Terms of equity not broadcast.	N/A	N/A
Episode 4	30 September 2012	Chrystal Rose	Lost For Words!	80,000	25	Game show based on word definitions	Lost For Words!pitch failed due to the dragons' belief that the game lacked uniqueness and felt Rose should have pitched a production company instead. Dissolved by 2017.	N/A	Dissolved (2017)
Episode 4	30 September 2012	Tony Heath	Showerfriend	50,000	N/A	Accessory for start buttons in showers	Showerfriend's pitch failed due to the dragons' belief that the device would cause droughts at campsites and leisure centres. Terms of equity not broadcast.	N/A	N/A
Episode 4	30 September 2012	Barbara Chalmers	Final Fling (Only Human)	N/A	N/A	Funeral-planning website	Final Fling's pitch failed following Chalmers’ struggle to convince the dragons of her net profit forecasts and their overall disbelief that the product would appeal to a mass market. Terms not broadcast. Remains active.		Active
Episode 4	30 September 2012	Caroline Brown	The Huntingford Company	80,000	30	Stick aid for toilets	The Huntingford Company's pitch failed due to the dragons' disbelief that the product's low cost would return the investment and were unconvinced with her business model. Dissolved by 2014.		Dissolved (2014)
Episode 4	30 September 2012	Rebecca Jane	N/A	N/A	Public relations company	N/A	Rebecca Jane's pitch failed due to the dragons' belief that her business was not relationship-driven and could not be considered PR. Company name, terms of equity nor money requested were broadcast.	N/A	N/A
Episode 4	30 September 2012	Simon Zhao and James Whybrow	Soulful Mood Music	N/A	N/A	Ornate tea company	Soulful Mood Music's pitch failed due to the dragons citing major net losses and lacked a unique selling point. Terms of equity not broadcast.	N/A	N/A
Episode 5	7 October 2012	Noora Lewis	Sensationelle	50,000	20	Stick-on eye make-up	Noora Lewis' pitch failed due to the dragons' belief that the product would be easily replicated and cited low sales.	N/A	N/A
Episode 5	7 October 2012	Ernie Griffin	Door Defender	65,000	N/A	Security bolt for doors	Door Defender's pitch failed due to the dragons citing cheaper products and belief that technology would outperform the product. Terms of equity not broadcast.		Dissolved (2010)
Episode 5	7 October 2012	John Bennett and Amanda Joseph	House of QI	70,000	N/A	Aid to prevent pillow slippage	House of QI's pitch failed due to the dragons' belief that the product did not solve any major sleeping issues. Terms of equity not broadcast. Dissolved by 2012.	N/A	Dissolved (2012)
Episode 5	7 October 2012	Glen Brady	Camping Bugs	250,000	30	Outdoor camping buildings made from scrap wood	Camping Bugs' pitch failed due to the dragons citing that Brady had not sold any units and felt the business was over-valued. Dissolved by 2015.	N/A	Dissolved (2015)
Episode 5	7 October 2012	Ash Hussain	N/A	N/A	N/A	Multi-angled paint brush handle	Ash Hussain's pitch failed due to the dragons citing replicas of the product already on the market. Company name, terms of money nor equity requested were broadcast.	N/A	N/A
Episode 5	7 October 2012	Daniel Martin	Dot-com	N/A	N/A	Mobile telephone contract exits	Dot-com's pitch failed due to the dragons citing networks would not sign up to the business as people would avoid termination fees and late payment charges. The terms of money and equity requested were not broadcast.	N/A	N/A
Episode 6	14 October 2012	Stuart Davies	Fight Factor	N/A	N/A	Mixed martial arts fighting tournament	Fight Factor's pitch failed due to the dragons' belief that Davies was better suited to find a promotional partner with the vast experience to handle marketing the business as opposed to an investor, later securing the money from a private investor after filming. The terms of money and equity requested were not broadcast.		Unclear
Episode 6	14 October 2012	Nick Gallagher-Hughes	Topline Dance Frame	97,500	15	Tuition aid designed to assist dancers	Topline Dance Frame's pitch failed due to the dragons' belief that the product would not sell to a mass market and was over-valued. Remains active.		Active
Episode 6	14 October 2012	Shaff Prabatani, Jay Bryan and Ben Rogers	Storemates	N/A	N/A	Online storage rental in homes	Storemates' pitch failed due to the dragons citing issues over security and the type of items stored. Terms of equity not broadcast. Dissolved by 2024.		Dissolved (2024)
Episode 6	14 October 2012	Padrig Huws and Dewi Roberts	Toffoc	N/A	N/A	Toffee-flavoured vodka	Toffoc's pitch failed due to the dragons citing net losses in their second and third years. The terms of money and equity requested were not broadcast. Remains active.		Active
Episode 6	14 October 2012	Dawson Sellar and Susan Corrie	Swing Garden Seat	N/A	N/A	Self assembly garden swing seat	Dawson Sellar's and Susan Corrie's pitch failed due to the dragons' belief the product was better suited to a distributor and for them to collect royalties. Terms not broadcast.	N/A	N/A
Episode 7	21 October 2012	Matt King	WeQ4U	150,000	1	App setting callbacks from call centres reducing waiting times	WeQ4U's pitch failed due to the dragons ridiculing the valuation based on a £40,000 net profit. Dissolved by 2021.		Dissolved (2021)
Episode 7	21 October 2012	Martin Shenton	Blue Green Yellow Dead Live	25,000	N/A	Live interactive shooting maze zombie game	Blue Green Yellow Dead Live's pitch failed due to the dragons' disbelief the game was worth the valuation pitched. Terms of equity not broadcast. Dissolved by 2018.	N/A	Dissolved (2018)
Episode 7	21 October 2012	Samantha Spake and Vanessa Harris	Rokka Play	N/A	N/A	Wooden toys	Rokka Play's pitch failed due to the dragons deeming the retail price to be too high. Terms not broadcast. Dissolved by 2016.		Dissolved (2016)
Episode 7	21 October 2012	Colin Bruton	Fellas Products Ltd	60,000	20	Cleansing wipes for men	Fellas Products Ltd's pitch failed due to the dragons citing Bruton's lack of research in the market. Dissolved by 2015.		Dissolved (2015)
Episode 7	21 October 2012	Joanna and Dean Barnes	The Daddy	N/A	N/A	Dust and debris eliminator	The Daddy's pitch failed due to the dragons cited its net profit before salaries indicated it was not ready for investment. Terms not broadcast. Dissolved by 2017.	N/A	Dissolved (2017)
Episode 7	21 October 2012	Barry Steptoe	The Home Portable Oche	50,000	10	Foldaway and portable oche	The Home Portable Oche's pitch failed due to the dragons . Terms of equity not broadcast. Remains active.		Active
Episode 8	28 October 2012	Ken Boyd	N/A	N/A	N/A	Wheel-cleaning device	Ken Boyd's pitch failed due to the dragons' belief that the product was over-complicated and did not compete with products on the market. Company name, terms of money and equity requested were not broadcast.	N/A	N/A
Episode 8	28 October 2012	Brian Smith	Poppets Ltd (Popagami)	N/A	N/A	Gift packages in the form of origamis	Popagami's pitch failed due to the dragons' disbelief that the product would appeal to a mass market. The terms of money and equity requested were not broadcast. Dissolved by 2024.		Dissolved (2024)
Episode 8	28 October 2012	Georgie and Simon King	DrumChasers (Music Fix Ltd)	60,000	20	Musical based on an abandoned concert hall	DrumChasers' pitch failed due to the dragons' belief the show would fail to sell out and produce a low return. Remains active.		Active
Episode 8	28 October 2012	Lindsay Porter	Proms	N/A	N/A	Party dresses for Prom's	Proms' pitch failed due to the dragons' belief that the products were already on the market and lacked a unique selling point. Terms not broadcast. Remains active.	N/A	N/A
Episode 8	28 October 2012	Adrienne Lane	Voice Letter	15,000	N/A	Delivery via voice message	Voice Letter's pitch failed due to the dragons citing the expense of using the service. Terms of equity not broadcast. Remains active.	N/A	Dissolved (2015)
Episode 9	11 November 2012	Hannah Windrass	Nebo	80,000	15	Device aiding chronic back problems	Nebo's pitch failed due to the dragons' disbelief that the product solved any issues when adjustable products were already on the market and that the patent did not cover all areas discussed. Dissolved by 2019.	N/A	Dissolved (2019)
Episode 9	11 November 2012	Kevin Stevens	Snowmule	N/A	N/A	Rucksack and tow for skiing	Snowmule's pitch failed due to the dragons' belief that the product was a burden on skiers and felt the item to be seasonal for a mass market. Terms not broadcast. Remains active.		Active
Episode 9	11 November 2012	James Mather and Lloyd Barrett	Expert Answers	N/A	N/A	Fee based legal advice	Expert Answers's pitch failed due to the dragons' belief that generic search engines would provide average answers and further detail would lead to solicitors being approached directly. The terms of money and equity requested were not broadcast. Remains active.		Active
Episode 9	11 November 2012	Natalie Balmond and Weze Hannam	Purepotions Skincare (renamed Balmonds)	90,000	15	Sensitive skincare cream	Purepotions Skincare's pitch failed due to the dragons feeling unassured that Balmond and Hannam would honestly disclose the company's progress. Company is in liquidation as of 2022 but remains active having been renamed as Balmonds.		Active
Episode 9	11 November 2012	Chris Poole and Ashley Watson	PWM Media Ltd	75,000	10	Guitar teaching aid for infants	PWM Media's pitch failed due to the dragons' disbelief that the product taught adequately and felt the company to be overvalued. Dissolved by 2021.	N/A	Dissolved (2021)
Episode 9	11 November 2012	Jaime O'Connor	The Oven Door Shield (By Jaime)	60,000	N/A	Suction-cleaning fixing for oven doors	The Oven Door Shield's pitch failed due to the dragons not citing any issues with the business, instead encouraging her to progress without investment. Terms of equity not broadcast. Dissolved by 2016.		Dissolved (2016)
Episode 10	18 November 2012	Stephen Charrot	Dayfame Luxury VIP Experiences	100,000	30	Celebrity lookalike experience entertainment	Dayfame Luxury VIP Experiences' pitch failed due to the dragons citing Charrot's struggle to explain how he would use the investment and felt he was better suited as an employee than a business owner. Dissolved by 2014.		Dissolved (2014)
Episode 10	18 November 2012	Malcolm Keeling	Rotorad	N/A	N/A	Aid for fixing radiators to the wall	Rotorad's pitch failed due to the dragons' concerns over the product rising the cost of radiators being installed and maintained. Terms not broadcast. Company in liquidation by 2024.		Liquidation (2024)
Episode 10	18 November 2012	Dominic Ricciardi	Caterquip UK (The Franchisor)	100,000	10	Franchisor of reconditioned catering equipment	The Franchisor's pitch failed due to the dragons' disbelief that the franchise would appeal to businesses as opposed to buying one unit when needed. Dissolved by 2017.		Dissolved (2017)
Episode 10	18 November 2012	John and Rosalind Tottie	N/A	N/A	N/A	Electronic bed lowered from attic	John and Rosalind Tottie's pitch failed due to the dragons citing low sales and a high RRP. Company name nor terms of money and equity requested were broadcast.	N/A	N/A
Episode 10	18 November 2012	Matthew Page and Louise Craven	Synergi Intelligence (Solmare Ltd)	95,000	20	Hand tool joining handles clamping a variety of heads	Synergi Intelligence's pitch failed due to the dragons' concerns that the patent would be heavily contested and bigger companies would compete heavily with similar products. Remains active.	N/A	Active
Episode 10	18 November 2012	Darren Smith and Richard Booth	Boost oxygen	50,000	N/A	10 litres of 99%-pure oxygen in a can	Boost oxygen's pitch failed due to the dragons struggle to determine whether it was to be sold as a sports drink or health supplement. Terms of equity not broadcast. Company appears to have since been sold in 2016 having appeared on U.S. equivalent show Shark Tank.		Sold (2016)
Episode 10	18 November 2012	Craig Ramshaw	Teen Drive	N/A	N/A	Driving school for over 14s	Teen Drive's pitch failed due to the dragons' disbelief that Ramshaw's proposed projections would be met with his lack of strategies pitched. Terms of equity not broadcast. Remains active.		Active
Episode 11	25 November 2012	Katie Harris and Adil Abrar	The Amazings	N/A	N/A	Social online teaching website	The Amazings' pitch failed due to the dragons citing no profits from their events to date. Terms of equity not broadcast. Dissolved by 2013.		Dissolved (2013)
Episode 11	25 November 2012	Mark Thompson	AceOn Battery Solar Technology Ltd	200,000	10	Portable solar power supply- SolarSDS	AceOn Group pitch failed due to the dragons citing the size of the product as not easily portable.	https://www.aceongroup.com	Active
Episode 11	25 November 2012	Mark Shepherd	Itsoles Ltd	50,000	15	Food insoles for women	Itsoles's pitch failed due to the dragons citing low sales after already receiving £70,000 worth of investment and comfort issues when wearing them. Dissolved by 2023.		Dissolved (2023)
Episode 11	25 November 2012	Abigail Patikis and Andreas Patikis	Tick-Tock	N/A	N/A	Visual aid for food shopping reminders	Tick-Tock's pitch failed due to the dragons' disbelief that the product would serve its purpose to a mass market. Terms not broadcast. Remains active.	N/A	Active
Episode 11	25 November 2012	Danny Keane and Phil Andrews	CarBQ	40,000	N/A	BBQ fitted into car boots	CarBQ's pitch failed due to the dragons citing low sales and advising that the business may be at too early a stage for investment. Terms of equity not broadcast. Remains active.	N/A	N/A
Episode 12	2 December 2012	Stephen Forshaw	Hire A Hive	N/A	N/A	Rental service for bee hives	Hire A Hive's pitch failed due to the dragons' disbelief in Forshaw having the skills to run the business well enough to return investment. Terms not broadcast. Dissolved by 2015.		Dissolved (2015)
Episode 12	2 December 2012	Jeff Meers	Carkoon	100,000	20	Baby car seat with air shields	Carkoon's pitch failed due to the dragons' belief that the car seat was little different to ones already on the market. Dissolved by 2016.		Dissolved (2016)
Episode 12	2 December 2012	Aretha Solanke	T Strap	N/A	N/A	Slipping aid for bras	T Strap's pitch failed due to the dragons' disbelief that the product was comfortable to wear. The terms of money and equity requested were not broadcast. Dissolved by 2014.	N/A	Dissolved (2014)
Episode 12	2 December 2012	Mark Tilley	Boatbox Ltd	100,000	16	Dinghy converting into vehicle roof box	Boatbox Ltd's pitch failed due to Tilley's unwillingness to negotiate a higher equity stake than 25% with Paphitis, whilst the other dragons cited car roof boxes already on the market as adequate for the issue supposedly solved. Dissolved by 2014.		Dissolved (2014)
Episode 12	2 December 2012	Craig Amor	Resiblock Ltd	N/A	N/A	Paving spacers for patios	Resiblock's pitch failed due to the dragons' disbelief that the product was useful. The terms of money and equity requested were not broadcast. Remains active.		Active
Christmas Special	27 December 2012	Melanie Hurley	Wish 4 Ticket	100,000	20	Seasonal online ticket service	Wish For Ticket's pitch failed due to the dragons citing net losses and ridiculed the valuation. Dissolved by 2015.		Dissolved (2015)
Christmas Special	27 December 2012	Frank and Barbara Hersey	Woolly Babs	N/A	N/A	Festive squeeking jumper designs	Woolly Babs' pitch failed due to the dragons citing low financial forecasts and believed a net loss would occur as a result of rent and salaries. Terms not broadcast. Remains active.		Active
Christmas Special	27 December 2012	Craig Head	Secret Santa	N/A	N/A	Potential Christmas single	Secret Santa's pitch failed. Terms not broadcast.	N/A	N/A
Christmas Special	27 December 2012	Kim and Jack Walmsley	Perfect Punch	N/A	N/A	Festive alcoholic punch	Perfect Punch's pitch failed due to the dragons' concerns that the sharing of punch recipes on the internet would render it difficult to sell to a mass market. Terms not broadcast. Dissolved by 2018.		Dissolved (2018)
Christmas Special	27 December 2012	Dave Harvey and Ben Lewis	Pucket (ET Games Ltd)	50,000	10	Wooden gaming boards	Pucket's pitch failed due to the dragons' belief that the game was overpriced and low net profits. Remains active.		Active
