= List of fellows of the Royal Society of Arts =

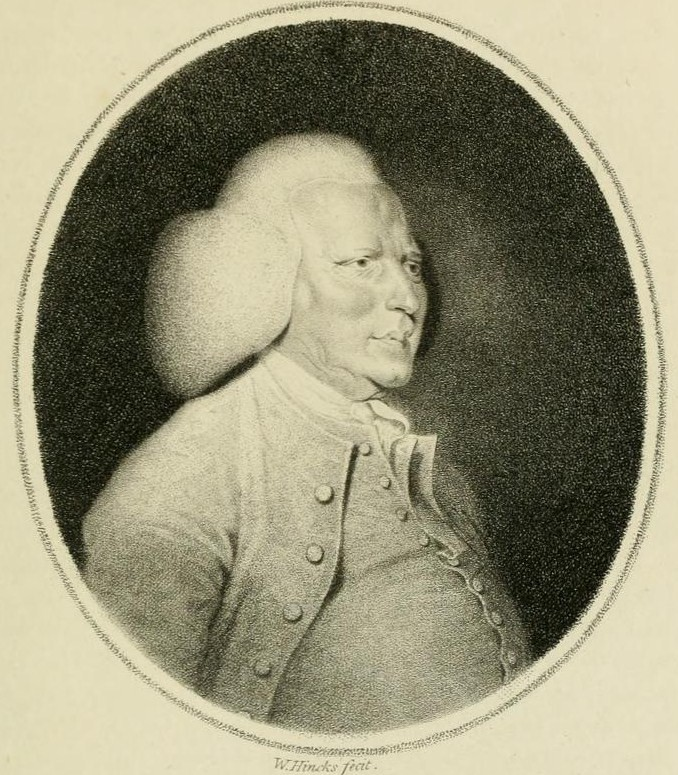
William Shipley, founder of the Society in 1754

Below is a partial list of fellows of the Royal Society of Arts (formally, the Royal Society for the Encouragement of Arts, Manufactures and Commerce). A Fellow of the Royal Society of Arts is entitled to use the post-nominal letters FRSA after their name.

== Fellowship ==
Fellowship is granted to applicants "who are aligned with the RSA's vision and share in our values." Some prospective fellows are approached by the RSA and invited to join in recognition of their work; some are nominated or "fast-tracked" by existing fellows and RSA staff, or by partner organisations such as the Churchill Fellowship; others make their own applications with accompanied references, which are reviewed by a formal admissions panel consisting of RSA trustees and fellowship councillors. As of 2022, the RSA has adopted an inclusive policy and stated that acceptance to the fellowship does not require the applicant to be "a leader in your industry or a CEO of an NGO".

Since its founding in 1754, the RSA Fellowship has grown to 30,000 members (as of 2020) who are distinguished by the post-nominal letters FRSA.

Charles Dickens, Adam Smith, Benjamin Franklin, Karl Marx, Richard Attenborough, William Hogarth, John Diefenbaker, Stephen Hawking, Benson Taylor and Tim Berners-Lee are some of the notable past and present Fellows, and today it has fellows elected from 80 countries worldwide.

Major meetings of Fellows are held at RSA House, an 18th-century building in London. Regional meetings also take place.

== Fellows of the RSA ==
=== A ===
- Gisela Abbam
- Mark Addis
- Jocelyn Frere Adburgham
- Julian Agyeman
- Sir Rodney Aldridge
- Enam Ali
- Sonita Alleyne
- Victor Ambrus
- Mohammed Amin
- Joyce Anelay, Baroness Anelay of St Johns
- Lorenzo Apicella
- Sara Arber
- Antony Armstrong-Jones, 1st Earl of Snowdon
- Timothy Garton Ash
- Paul Atherton
- Paul Atterbury
- John Ault

=== B ===
- Iain Baikie
- Dame Janet Baker
- Ken Banks
- Muhammad Abdul Bari
- Barbara Barber
- Clive Barda
- Corelli Barnett
- Reuven Bar-On
- Professor Richard Bartle
- Earl W. Bascom
- David Battie
- Patrick Baty
- Philip Bawcombe
- Oliver Bayldon
- Ingrid Beazley
- Mark Beech
- John Belchem
- John Bell
- Giacomo Benedetto
- Anthony Benjamin
- Ralph Benjamin
- Gerald Bernbaum
- Sir Tim Berners-Lee
- Sir Michael Berry
- James Bethell, 5th Baron Bethell
- Christopher Bigsby
- Robert Black
- Sue Black
- Georgina Lara Booth
- Michael Blower
- John Bly
- Katalin Bogyay
- Emma Bossons
- Jonathan Bowen
- José Antonio Bowen
- Alex Boyd
- Jane Boyd
- Tim Brain
- Dame Glynis Breakwell
- John David Brewer
- Dame Lynne Brindley
- Patricia Broadfoot
- Laurence Broderick
- Jeremy Broun
- John Burgan
- Saffron Burrows
- Steve Burrows
- Dame Alexandra Burslem
- James J. Busuttil
- Paula Byrne

=== C ===
- Martin John Callanan
- Sir Colin Campbell
- Ian Campbell, 12th Duke of Argyll
- John Cannon
- Andrew Cantrill
- George Carey, Baron Carey of Clifton
- Elizabeth Carnegy, Baroness Carnegy of Lour
- William Carron, Baron Carron
- David Carter
- George Washington Carver
- Maie Casey, Baroness Casey
- Roger Cashmore
- Joseph Cassidy
- Hugh Cavendish, Baron Cavendish of Furness
- Andrew Cayley
- Carolina Ceca
- Mark Champkins
- Sylvia Chant
- Mike Chaplin
- Sir Frank Chapman
- Allan Chappelow
- Christine Charlesworth
- David Childs
- Suhwang Cho
- Matthew Churchill
- Tony Christopher, Baron Christopher
- Roy Clare
- Brian Clarke
- Marcus Clarke
- Eileen Clegg
- Timothy Clement-Jones, Baron Clement-Jones
- Brian Coleman
- Sir Michael Colman, 3rd Baronet
- Sir Timothy Colman
- Paul Condon, Baron Condon
- Douglas Connell
- Sir Francis Cook, 4th Baronet
- Sophie Cook
- Ida Copeland
- Sioban Coppinger
- Andrew Copson
- Christian Cardell Corbet
- Frank Corner
- Donald Covington
- Elizabeth Craig
- Ted Craig
- Paul Crawford
- Christine Crawley, Baroness Crawley
- Freeman Wills Crofts
- Geoffrey Crossick
- Craig Crowley
- Bobby Cummines
- Sir Philip Cunliffe-Owen

=== D ===
- Miriam David
- George Davies
- Rupert Davies
- Sir Ed Davey
- Richard Digby Day
- Brenda Dean, Baroness Dean of Thornton-le-Fylde
- Michael de Percy
- Sir Dermot de Trafford, 6th Baronet
- Edmund de Waal
- Graeme Dell
- Dame Judi Dench
- John Denham
- John Denison
- Simon Denny
- Nirj Deva
- Hilary Devey
- Hugh Welch Diamond
- Michael Dickson
- John Diefenbaker
- Marcus Dillistone
- Rita Donaghy, Baroness Donaghy
- Danny Dorling
- Andrew Downes
- Madge Dresser
- Joseph Drew
- James Dugdale, 2nd Baron Crathorne
- Alfred Dunhill
- Sir Vivian Dunn
- John Dunston
- Bill Durodié
- Paul du Quenoy
- Bob Dylan
- Mulalo Doyoyo
- Mischa Dohler
- Ambika Dhurandhar

=== E ===
- Ivan Edwards (physician)
- Elliot Engel
- Dame Elizabeth Esteve-Coll
- Jonathan Evans
- Matthew Evans, Baron Evans of Temple Guiting
- Bernardine Evaristo

=== F ===
- Sir Allen Fairhall
- Sir Donald Keith Falkner
- Lionel Fanthorpe
- Paul S. Farmer
- Donald R. Findlay QC
- Jerry Fishenden
- Anthony FitzClarence, 7th Earl of Munster
- Stephen Fleet
- Sir Roderick Floud
- Paul Flowers
- Daphne Foskett
- Sir Nigel Foulkes
- Sir Christopher Foxley-Norris
- Hywel Francis
- Barnett Freedman
- Arnold Friberg
- Plantagenet Somerset Fry

=== G ===
- David Galloway
- Andrew Gamble
- Joss Garman
- Robert Garner
- Trixie Gardner, Baroness Gardner of Parkes
- Mary Lynne Gasaway Hill
- Barney Gibbens
- David Gibbins
- Nigel Gilbert
- Pamela Gillies
- Ablade Glover
- Peter Goffin
- Derrick Gosselin
- Alex Graham
- James L. Gray
- A. C. Grayling
- Dame Beryl Grey
- Robert Melville Grindlay

=== H ===
- Susannah Hagan
- Reginald George Haggar
- George Haig, 2nd Earl Haig
- Andy Haldane
- John Robert Hall
- David Hallam
- William B. Hamilton
- Robert Gavin Hampson
- James Hannigan
- Aaron Hape
- Molly Harrison
- James Harkness
- Dominick Harrod
- Adam Hart-Davis
- John Hartley
- Sir George Harvie-Watt
- Sir David Haslam
- Demis Hassabis
- Stephen Hawking
- Lucinda Hawksley
- John Hayes
- Clare Henry
- Saul Hayes
- James Hemming
- John Hemming
- Julian Henry
- Martin Henson
- Nicholas Herbert, 3rd Baron Hemingford
- Gill Hicks
- Chris Higgins
- Sir Graham Hills
- Peter Hinton
- Susie Hodge
- Mark Hodson
- Jonathan Holloway
- Gloria Hooper, Baroness Hooper
- Deian Hopkin
- Aida Hoteit
- James Archibald Houston
- David Russell Hulme
- Robin Hyman

=== I ===
- Margaret Irwin
- Walter Isaacson
- Leonora Payne Ison

=== J ===
- Alex James
- Kirthi Jayakumar
- Bob Jeffery
- Peter Jonas
- Alan Jones
- Philip Jones
- Tony Jones
- Thomas Brown Jordan
- Paul Judge
- Satvinder S. Juss

=== K ===
- Andrew Karney
- Paul Karslake
- Kevin Keasey
- Stathis Kefallonitis
- Greta Kempton
- Raju Kendre
- Helena Kennedy, Baroness Kennedy of The Shaws
- Alexander James Kent
- Julie Kent
- James Kerwin
- Anthony King
- Glenys Kinnock
- Jim Knight
- Angus Knowles-Cutler
- Philip Koomen
- David Kossoff

=== L ===
- Hector Laing, Baron Laing of Dunphail
- John Laird, Baron Laird
- David Lammy
- John Large
- Michael Latham
- Abdul Latif
- James Laver
- Deborah Lavin
- Ruth Lea
- George Lee, 3rd Earl of Lichfield
- Lee Jinjoon
- Lim Hyung-joo
- Diane Lees
- Oliver Letwin
- Daniel Levitin
- Manuel Lima
- Tony Little
- John Lloyd
- Patricia Lovett
- Arthur Lowe
- Chris Luck
- Tzaims Luksus
- David Lumsden

=== M ===
- Dickson Mabon
- Malcolm Macdonald (engineer)
- David Mach
- Mavis Maclean
- Robin MacPherson
- Rachel Workman MacRobert
- Tom Maibaum
- Charles Robertson Maier
- Mahmoud Bukar Maina
- Amir Ali Majid
- Kenan Malik
- Gareth Malone
- Rogemar Mamon
- Arthur Mamou-Mani
- Peter Manning
- David Marquand
- Kevin Marsh
- Michael Marshall
- Arthur Marshman
- Doreen Massey
- Rod I. McAllister
- Murray McLachlan
- John McClelland
- Peter McCreath
- Alexander McDonnell, 9th Earl of Antrim
- Colin McDowell
- Ian McEwan
- John McIntosh
- Charles McKean
- Rosamond McKitterick
- Paul Mealor
- Tommy Miah
- Paul Michael
- Darren Millar
- Anthea Millett
- Greg Mills
- John W. Mills
- Madeleine Mitchell
- Jonathan Morgan
- Kevin A. Morrison
- Audrey Mullender
- Geoffrey Munn
- Turi Munthe
- Peter Murray
- Anton Muscatelli

=== N ===
- Peter Nahum
- Simeon Nelson
- Elizabeth Neville
- Sarah Newton
- Edward Ng
- David Emmanuel Noel
- Sally Jane Norman
- George Nugent, Baron Nugent of Guildford

=== O ===
- Claire Oboussier
- Paddy O'Connell
- Ken Olisa
- Philip and Andrew Oliver
- Harold M. O'Neal
- Iain Osborne
- Richard Ovenden

=== P ===
- John Paddock
- Juliet Pannett
- Michael Paraskos
- Bhikhu Parekh
- Eva Pascoe
- Samit Patel
- Daphne Park, Baroness Park of Monmouth
- Philip Payton
- Dame Alison Peacock
- Charles Thomas Pearce
- Angier March Perkins
- Alan Pegler
- Matt Percival
- Richard Perham
- Stewart Perowne
- Bishnodat Persaud
- Barrie Pettman
- Vong Phaophanit
- Alison Phipps
- Nicola Phillips
- David Andrew Phoenix
- Gerald Pillay
- Alan Pipes
- Melvin Poh
- Allan Pollok-Morris
- Jason Pontin
- Melissa Price
- Philip Priestley
- Ian Proctor

=== R ===
- Ebony-Jewel Rainford-Brent
- Ravi Rajan
- Benjamin Ramm
- Andrew Rawnsley
- Alan Rayner
- Geoffrey Rees
- Seona Reid
- Michael Reiss
- Shai Reshef
- Susan Rice
- Sir John Riddell, 13th Baronet
- Keith Riglin
- Rosa Gumataotao Rios
- James Martin Ritchie
- Ken Ritchie
- Baron Goronwy-Roberts
- Nigel Roberts
- George Robertson, Baron Robertson of Port Ellen
- Duncan Robinson
- Sir Ken Robinson
- Sue Roffey
- Edina Ronay
- E. Clive Rouse
- Lindsay Roy
- Sir Ronald Russell
- Lloyd Russell-Moyle
- Shane Ryan

=== S ===
- Srinivasa Ramanujan
- Alireza Sagharchi
- Caroline St John-Brooks
- Marina Salandy-Brown
- Constantine Sandis
- Teresa Ann Savoy
- Marjorie Scardino
- Matthew Schellhorn
- Leslie Rogne Schumacher
- Winn Schwartau
- Steven Schwartz
- Sam Scorer
- Ernest Seitz
- John Sentamu
- Alok Sharma
- Kriti Sharma
- John Shaw
- Patrick Shea
- David Shepherd
- Denis Shipwright
- Steve Shirley
- Helena Shovelton
- Tulip Siddiq
- Mona Siddiqui
- Andrew Sinclair
- Donald Sinden
- Jasvir Singh
- Paul Sinton-Hewitt
- Eugene Skeef
- Chris Skidmore
- Denis Smallwood
- Adam Smith
- Dick Smith
- Anick Soni
- Ralph Sorley
- Mike Southon
- John Speakman
- Paul Spicer
- Julian Stair
- Gilbert Stead
- Petra Štefanková
- Linda Joy Stern
- John Stevens, Baron Stevens of Kirkwhelpington
- Stewart Stevenson
- John Sunderland
- Richard Susskind
- David Sutton
- Philip Sutton
- Antony G. Sweeney

=== T ===
- Ralph Tabberer
- Daniel Tammet
- Benson Taylor
- James Taylor
- Iain Tennant
- Sir Gervais Tennyson-d'Eyncourt, 2nd Baronet
- D. D. Thacker
- Eric Thomas
- Martyn Thomas
- Geoff Thompson
- David Thomson
- Mildred Valley Thornton
- Lewis Thorpe
- Mike Tomlinson
- Sarah Tremlett
- Anthony Trewavas

=== U ===
- Peter Underwood
- Matthew Uttley

=== V ===
- Iain Vallance, Baron Vallance of Tummel
- Andrekos Varnava
- Paul Vaughan
- John Vereker
- David Verney, 21st Baron Willoughby de Broke
- Richard Veryard
- Herman Voaden
- Robert von Dassanowsky

=== W ===
- David S. Wall
- Robert Walmsley
- David Warburton
- John Macqueen Ward
- Sarah Wardle
- Claire Watt-Smith
- Hilary Wayment
- Anthony S. Weiss
- Benjamin West
- Steve Wharton
- Tom Wheare
- David Wheeldon
- James Whitbourn
- Chandra Wickramasinghe
- Barbara Wilding
- Michael Wilford
- Alan Lee Williams
- Christopher Williams
- L. F. Rushbrook Williams
- Rorden Wilkinson
- Edward A. Wilson
- Edward Wilson
- Robert Winston
- Chris Wise
- Charles W. J. Withers
- John Wodehouse, 5th Earl of Kimberley
- Heinz Wolff
- Levison Wood
- Jim Woodcock
- Jeff Woolf
- Derek Wyatt

=== Y ===
- William Yolland
- Douglas Young
- Jock Young

=== Z ===
- Graham J Zellick
- Igor Zeiger
- Zhengxu Zhao

== Historical members ==
The following have been members of the society historically:

=== A ===
- Archibald Acheson, 6th Earl of Gosford
- Sarah Angelina Acland
- Kenneth Adam
- Robert Adam
- Barbara G. Adams
- Douglas Allen, Baron Croham
- John Arbuthnott, 16th Viscount of Arbuthnott
- Richard Arkwright
- William Armstrong
- Ellis Ashton
- Eric Auld

=== B ===
- Reginald Poynton Baker
- Jeremiah Daniel Baltimore
- Earl W. Bascom
- John Frederick Bateman
- Leslie Banks
- Raymond Baxter
- Phil Belbin
- Gordon Beveridge
- John Boileau
- Gordon Borrie, Baron Borrie
- Jacob Bouverie, 1st Viscount Folkestone
- Druie Bowett
- Joyanne Bracewell
- Charles Bray
- Frederick Lee Bridell
- Isambard Kingdom Brunel
- Bryce Chudleigh Burt

=== C ===
- Henry Cole
- Gladys Colton

=== D ===
- Charles Dickens
- John Diefenbaker
- Joseph Drew
- M. V. Dhurandhar

=== E ===
- Cuthbert Hamilton Ellis

=== F ===
- William Fairbairn
- Joshua Field
- Hugh Foss
- John Fowler
- Sir Charles Fox
- Benjamin Franklin
- Sambrooke Freeman
- Charles William Fremantle
- William Froude

=== G ===
- Thomas Gainsborough
- Joseph Glynn
- John Viret Gooch
- Charles Greaves

=== H ===
- John Hawkshaw
- John Hick
- William Hogarth

=== J ===
- P. D. James

=== K ===
- John Joseph Jolly Kyle

=== L ===
- Robert Michael Laffan
- Joseph Locke

=== M ===
- Guglielmo Marconi
- Charles Manby
- Enid Marx
- Karl Marx
- David Menhennet
- Matthew Murray

=== N ===
- Richard Lindsay Nicholson

=== P ===
- Thomas Page
- Linus Pauling
- John Penn
- Robert Baden-Powell

=== R ===
- Srinivasa Ramanujan
- John Urpeth Rastrick
- John Robinson McClean
- John Rennie
- Joshua Reynolds
- John Scott Russell

=== S ===
- Edgar J. Saxon
- Gertrud Seidmann
- William Shipley, founder in 1754
- Carl Wilhelm Siemens
- James Simpson
- Adam Smith
- Robert Stephenson

=== T ===
- John Richard Townsend

=== U ===
- Peter Ustinov
- Edward Vernon Utterson

=== V ===
- Cornelius Varley
- Charles Blacker Vignoles
- Vivian Virtue

=== W ===
- Hilda Annetta Walker
- James Walker
- Joseph Whitworth
- William Wilberforce
- Edward Woods
