= Leeds University Business School =

British business and economics school

Coordinates: 53.808°N 1.553°W

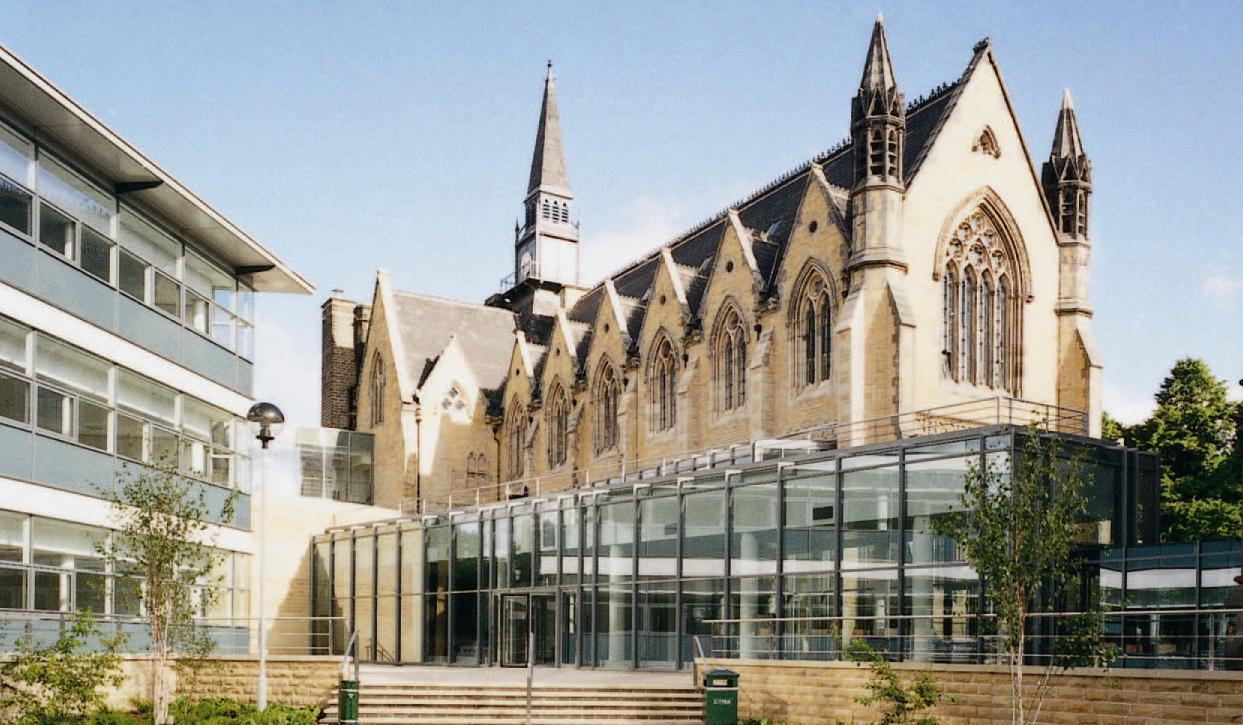
- Type: Business School
- Established: School of Economic Studies – 1965; School of Management Studies – 1965; School of Business and Economic Studies – 1988; Leeds University Business School 1997; Faculty of Business – 2003.
- Affiliations: University of Leeds
- Dean: Julia Bennell
- Academic staff: 200
- Students: 4,000
- Undergraduates: 2,000
- Postgraduates: 2,300 Masters students and over 100 Postgraduate Researchers
- Location: Leeds, England
- Website: https://business.leeds.ac.uk

Leeds University Business School is a business school in the University of Leeds, in Leeds, West Yorkshire, England. The school is accredited by AACSB, AMBA and EQUIS.

== Location ==
Leeds University Business School is housed in several buildings at the University of Leeds, including the 19th-century Maurice Keyworth building (previously Leeds Grammar School), Charles Thackrah building and Clarendon building. The School also shares the Newlyn building and Esther Simpson building with the School of Law, which officially opened in October 2019 and March 2022 respectively. Leeds University Business School is situated on the western campus of the University of Leeds, located 1 mile (1.6 km) north of Leeds city centre. The Marks & Spencer company archive is also housed here, containing over 60,000 artefacts and pieces moved there in 2009 from London to Leeds, the birthplace of the company. Further buildings include the Liberty Building, home to the Faculty of Law, and Western Lecture Theatre.

== Profile and reputation ==
For business and management research, Leeds was ranked twelfth in the UK for the quality of its research and fifth for research power in the 2021 Research Excellence Framework. It had 145 research active full time equivalent staff in business and management, making it the sixth largest group in the UK.

In the QS Business Master's Rankings 2026, Leeds University Business School was ranked 10th globally for supply chain management, 18th for international trade, 24th for marketing, 34th for finance, and 59th for management and in the 51–60 range for business analytics. The Leeds MBA was ranked 75th globally in the QS Global MBA Rankings 2026.

In the QS World University Rankings by Subject 2026, accounting and finance, business and management studies, and marketing were all ranked within the world's top 100.

== Alumni ==
Notable Business School alumni include:

- Roger Whiteside, CEO Greggs
- José Ángel Gurría, Secretary General of the OECD
- Sir Peter Hendy CBE, Chairman of Network Rail
- John R Hirst, former CEO of the Met Office
- Subir Raha, former chairman and managing director of the Oil and Natural Gas Corporation
- Jayant Krishna, Group CEO of the UK India Business Council and former CEO of the National Skill Development Corporation
- Sudhir Chaturvedi, President and Executive board member at Larsen & Toubro Infotech

== Current notable academics ==
Leeds University Business School has over 200 academic staff.

- Peter Buckley (academic)
- Kevin Keasey
