= Julie Kent =

Julie Kent may refer to:

- Julie Kent (diver) (born 1965), Australian diver
- Julie Kent (dancer) (born 1969), American ballet dancer
- Julie Kent (sociologist) (born 1957), British sociologist
- Julie Dawn Kent, High Sheriff of Gloucestershire

== See also ==
- Julia Kent, Canadian cellist and composer
