= Utley =

Utley may refer to:

== People ==
- Utley (surname)

== Places ==
United Kingdom

- Utley, West Yorkshire, a village in England

United States

- Utley, Ohio
- Utley, Texas
- Utley, Wisconsin
- Utleyville, Colorado

== See also ==
- Uttley
