= Barbara Barber =

Canadian artist

- Born: Barbara Muir; 1873; Brantford, Ontario
- Died: 1966 (age 93); Regina Beach, Saskatchewan
- Education: Moulton College
- Known for: watercolour, oil, ceramics, woodcarving, china painting
- Awards: 1940 Fellow of the Royal Society of Arts

Barbara Barber FRSA (1873–1966) was a Canadian artist. Barber, along with Sybil Henley Jacobson and Harriette Keating was one of two of the founding members of the Women's Art Association of Saskatchewan. Barber moved to Regina with her husband in 1912. She trained in Toronto and was a Fellow of the Royal Society of Arts.

== Life, education and work ==
Barber was born in Brantford, Ontario, in 1873. She was the daughter of John and Jennie Muir. In 1889, she attended Moulton College Baptist Boarding School in Toronto, where she took classes in art, French, and German. She married Fred Barber on June 18, 1896. The couple lived in various locations throughout Canada, including Regina (1912-1945), Vancouver (1945-1954), and Regina Beach (1954-1966). She and Fred had two sons, Gordon and Muir. She continued to live in Regina Beach after her husband's death in 1956.

Barber was a founding member (1920) and second president of the Regina Local Council of Women (LCW) Fine and Applied Art Committee, serving from 1922 to 1928. In 1928, she co-founded the Women's Art Association of Saskatchewan. She became the second Canadian to become a Fellow of the Royal Society of Arts in Britain when she was nominated for her artistic and cultural contributions to Saskatchewan's art community. In 1959 she helped to open the Art Centre at Regina Beach.

Barber specialized in painting landscape painting in oils, still life and portraits. She also did work in china painting in limoge and Bavarian china. She also taught oil painting, ceramics, and wood carving. Her art can be viewed in public buildings in Regina, Toronto, Brandtford, Moose Jaw, and Galt.

== Exhibitions ==
=== Group exhibitions ===
- 1941: The Regina Sketch Club, Hotel Saskatchewan, Regina, Saskatchewan
- 1941: Lyceum Club, Toronto, Ontario
- 1941: Women's Art Association, Moose Jaw Club, Moose Jaw, Saskatchewan
- 1971: Saskatchewan: Art and Artists, Norman Mackenzie Art Gallery, Regina, Saskatchewan

=== Solo exhibitions ===
- 1932: City Hall, Regina, Saskatchewan
