= Aida Hoteit =

Lebanese academic

Aida Hoteit FRSA
- Born: Lebanon
- Occupations: Professor of Architecture and Urban Planning at the Lebanese University

Academic background
- Education: Lebanese University (BA, DES), Complutense University of Madrid (MPhil), Polytechnic University of Madrid (PhD)
- Thesis: Cultura, espacio y organización urbana en la ciudad islámica (Culture, space and urban organization in the Islamic city) (1993)
- Doctoral advisor: Fernando Chueca Goitia

Academic work
- Discipline: Architecture; Urban Planning

Aida Hoteit FRSA (Arabic: عايدة حطيط) is a Lebanese architect, academic and scholar. She is a Professor of Architecture and Urban Planning at the Lebanese University. Hoteit is a Fellow of the Royal Society of Arts.

== Education ==
Hoteit received a BA with Honors in Clinical Psychology and a DES with Honors in Architecture from the Lebanese University in 1988 and 1989, respectively. After moving to Spain, she attained an MPhil in Social Psychology from the Complutense University of Madrid in 1992 and a PhD summa cum laude in Architecture/Urban Planning from the Polytechnic University of Madrid in 1993.

== Career ==
Hoteit served as an Architect and the Chairperson of the Department of Urban Planning at the Ministry of Public Works and Transport (Lebanon) between 1995 and 2000. Since 1993, she has been conducting academic work at the Lebanese University Faculty of Fine Arts and Architecture, where she is currently a professor. She served as the Chairperson of the Department of Architecture twice from 2001 to 2003 and 2015 to 2019. She was appointed Director of the Faculty of Fine Arts and Architecture between 2021 and 2024.

== Awards ==
Hoteit is a Fellow of the Royal Society of Arts (2019).
