= Clara Hume =

Canadian artist

- Born: Clara Burbidge; 1914; Kindersley, Saskatchewan
- Died: 2006; Saskatoon, Saskatchewan
- Known for: Painter

Clara Hume (1914 in Kindersley, Saskatchewan – 2006 in Saskatoon, Saskatchewan) was a Canadian painter. Her work is largely focused on landscapes and still lifes. Her paintings have been exhibited in Saskatchewan and Manitoba as part of group and solo exhibitions. She was particularly noted for her detailed acrylic paintings of prairie wildflowers and grasses, and prairie landscapes.

== Early life ==
Her family moved to Saskatoon in 1925. She started painting as a child and eventually went on to study art at the University of Saskatchewan (1936, 1943, 1945, 1961) and the Saskatchewan Technical Collegiate (1938). She studied drawing, watercolor, oil painting, ceramics and sculpture with artists including Augustus Kenderdine, Ernest Lindner, Nikola Bjelajac, Gordon Snelgrove, and Eli Bornstein. She was married to photographer and educator Clare Hume on August 9, 1937 and had three children. They spent many hours enjoying the prairie and especially wildflowers, which would become the subjects for photography and painting.

== Career ==
Hume's first group show was held in 1944 at the Saskatoon Art Centre. Her paintings are largely landscapes and still lifes, and can be found represented in the collections of the Saskatchewan Arts Board, Mendel Art Gallery (now, Remai Modern), Winnipeg Art Gallery, Saskatoon Public School Board, the National Gallery of Canada Canadian Museum of Contemporary Photography, and in private collections. From 1964 to 1975, She organized elementary school programs for children in Saskatoon through a partnership with the Mendel Art Gallery. She exhibited her works with the Saskatoon Art Association and the Regina Women's Artists Association in the 1940s. She was a member of the Saskatoon Camera Club and the namesake of the Transparency Battle trophy.

A collection of her paintings of Great Plains flora, which were acquired by the Mendel Art Gallery in 1975, were exhibited as part of An apology, a pill, a ritual, a resistance (2021) in the Remai Modern Gallery. The plants featured in the collection have medicinal uses, some widely known, and others which are sacred knowledge of First Nations and Métis Medicine people.
