= Plantagenet Somerset Fry =

British historian and writer

- Born: Peter George Robin Fry; 3 January 1931
- Died: 10 September 1996; Wattisfield, Suffolk, England, UK
- Education: Lancing College and St. Thomas's Hospital Medical School and St Catherine's College, Oxford
- Occupation: Writer
- Spouse(s): Audrey Russell, Daphne Yorke, Leri Butler, Fiona Whitcombe
- Parent(s): Peter Kenneth Llewellyn Fry and Ruth Emily (née Marriott)

Plantagenet Somerset Fry, born Peter George Robin Fry, sometimes used the names 'Peter George Robin Somerset Fry' and 'Peter George Robin Plantagenet Somerset Fry' (3 January 1931 – 10 September 1996), was a British historian and author of more than 50 books. In his youth, he added Somerset to his surname by deed poll, the Fry family originating from Wells in that county, and Plantagenet was a nickname which he adopted at university, relating to his advocacy of Richard III.

== Early life ==
Peter George Robin Fry was born in 1931, and was the third child and only son of a distinguished naval officer (created OBE in the 1953 New Year Honours) and pianist. He was educated at Christ Church Cathedral School, Oxford, then Lancing College in West Sussex, and St. Thomas's Hospital Medical School, London, but did not do well at either of the latter two institutions.

After failing his exams, he had to leave St. Thomas's after a year. From this point on his father refused to subsidise him any more, so Fry found employment as a librarian and projectionist with the National Film Board of Canada. In 1952 he inherited some money from his grandmother, left his job and married, against his parents' wishes, Audrey Russell whom he had known at medical school. After spending all his money, and failing another degree, Fry became a schoolteacher at Wallop School in Weybridge, Surrey.

In 1954, Fry began study of law and history at St Catherine's College, Oxford. Needing more money, he twice took part in the television game show Double Your Money, and won the jackpot of £512, making him something of a celebrity, and had his first book, Mysteries of History, published, soon followed by a biography of Elizabeth I. This was the start of a successful writing career, and over the years he wrote numerous popular books about history for adults and for children, as well as books about antiques. He started the Council for Independent Archaeology. Fry was a Fellow of the Royal Society of Arts. During the 1950s and 1960s, Fry worked as a public relations executive and, amongst other roles, served as an information officer for the Association of Architects and Surveyors and for the Ministry of Public Building and Works.

== Personal life ==
Although Fry's professional life was successful, his personal life was unhappy. His first marriage to Audrey Russell was dissolved in 1957.

The following year he married Daphne Elizabeth Caroline, daughter of Major (Hon. Lt-Col) Frederick Reginald Yorke, of a Yorkshire landed gentry family. However, she was soon diagnosed with an incurable form of kidney cancer, although Fry never let her know it. After her death in 1961, he set up a medical research trust in her memory.

He then married Mrs Leri Butler (née Llywelyn-Jones), a divorcée (previously married to Pierce Alan Somerset David Butler, son of the 7th Earl of Carrick); she was 24 years his senior. The marriage ended in divorce in 1973.

The following year he married Fiona Whitcombe, who survived him.

He was the victim of several car crashes, one of which made him reliant on the use of a wheelchair for many years.

== Death ==
In 1996, Fry was told he was dying of bowel cancer, but he refused treatment, and suffocated himself with a plastic bag at his home in Wattisfield, Suffolk at the age of 65, after writing a letter explaining his actions to the coroner.

== Selected works ==
- Kings and Queens of England and Scotland ISBN 978-1-4053-7367-8
- Castles: England, Scotland, Wales, Ireland ISBN 0715322125
- The History of Scotland ISBN 0710090013
- The Roman World, 200 B.C.-A.D. 300 ISBN 0333255429
- 1000 Great Lives
- The Tower of London: Cauldron of Britain's Past ISBN 0870529439
- The Zebra Book of Famous Women ISBN 0237352486
- Roman Britain ISBN 0389204390
