= Stathis Kefallonitis =

Greek-American strategist (born 1977)

Stathis Kefallonitis FRSA FRAeS
- Born: Efstathios Kefallonitis
- Education: University College London (Master of Philosophy); Cranfield University (Doctor of Philosophy); Goldsmiths University of London (MA); Cornell University (Cert)
- Occupations: Scientist, Writer, Professor, Businessman
- Scientific career
- Workplaces: State University of New York at Oswego; Embry–Riddle Aeronautical University
- Website: stathis.aero

Efstathios "Stathis" Kefallonitis FRSA FRAeS FCIM (born 1977) is a Greek-American consumer engagement strategist, neuroscientist and member of the leadership team at United Airlines. He has had a scientific career at Embry-Riddle Aeronautical University & University College London. He is a foundation board member of the International Flight Services Association (IFSA) & a former board member of the International Flight Services Association.

== Awards & Recognition ==
- (United Kingdom) Fellow of the Royal Society for the Encouragement of Arts, Manufacturers & Commerce (FRSA). This gave him the Post Nominal Letters "FRSA" for Life.
- (United Kingdom) Fellow of the Royal Aeronautical Society (FRAeS). This gave him the Post Nominal Letters "FRAeS" for Life.
- (United Kingdom) Fellow Chartered Institute of Marketing (FCIM). This gave him the Post Nominal Letters "FCIM" for Life.
- (United States) Board Member of the International Flight Services Association (IFSA).
