= Utley (surname) =

Utley is a surname. Notable people with the surname include:

- Adrian Utley (born 1957), British jazz guitarist
- Chase Utley (born 1978), American baseball player
- Freda Utley (1898–1978), English scholar, activist, and nonfiction author
- Garrick Utley (1939–2014), American television journalist
- George Utley (1887–1966), English footballer
- Jerome Utley (1881–1959), American baseball player and coach, contracting engineer, hotelier and boxing promoter
- Justin Utley, American rock singer and songwriter
- Mel Utley (1953–2019), American basketball player
- Michael Utley (born 1947), American musician and record producer
- Mike Utley (born 1970), Royal Navy officer and NATO commander
- Mike Utley (born 1965), American football player
- Robert M. Utley (1929–2022), American author and historian
- Stan Utley (born 1962), American golfer
- Steven Utley (1948–2013), American writer
- T. E. Utley (1921–1988), British columnist
- Tom Utley (born 1952), British columnist, son of T. E.
- William L. Utley (1814–1887), American military officer and politician

== See also ==
- Uttley
