= Uttley =

Uttley is a surname. Notable people with the surname include:

- Albert Uttley (1906–1985)
- Alison Uttley (1884–1976), British writer
- Kenneth Uttley (1913–1973), New Zealand cricketer
- Linda Uttley (1966–2009), English rugby player
- Matthew Uttley (born 1965), British defence academic
- Roger Uttley (born 1949), English rugby player
- Terry Uttley (1951–2021), bass guitarist, Smokie

== See also ==
- Parsons (Livestock) Ltd v Uttley Ingham & Co Ltd QB 791, an English contract law case concerning remoteness of damage
- Utley (disambiguation)
