= Abdul Latif (restaurateur) =

Bangladeshi-born British restaurateur (1954–2008)

- Born: 15 December 1954; Sylhet District, East Bengal, Pakistan (now Bangladesh)
- Died: 20 January 2008 (aged 53); Newcastle, Tyne and Wear, England
- Spouse: Neawarun Latif
- Culinary career
- Cooking style: Bangladeshi/Indian cuisine
- Current restaurant
- Rupali
- Previous restaurant
- Curry Capital (formerly Rupali)
- Award
- Fellow of the Royal Society of Arts
- Website: www.therupali.co.uk

Abdul Latif (Bengali: আব্দুল লতিফ; 15 December 1954 – 20 January 2008) was a Bangladeshi-born British restaurateur and curry chef in Newcastle upon-Tyne who became famous nationwide because of his regular appearances in Viz magazine. He was well known for his dish "Curry Hell" introduced in 1987 – a curry reputedly so hot (Abdul Latif claimed it was "the world's hottest") that it was offered for free to patrons of his Newcastle restaurant who could finish the entire meal. The dish contained four times the amount of chilli found in a typical vindaloo.

== Early life ==
Abdul Latif was born near the city of Sylhet, Sylhet District, East Bengal, Pakistan (now Bangladesh). In 1969, he arrived in the United Kingdom and settled in Manchester; a racist incident one night persuaded Abdul Latif to move north to Newcastle. He was married to Neawarun, with whom he had four daughters and two sons.

== Career ==
Abdul Latif's first job on Tyneside was as a waiter in a restaurant owned by a relative in Whitley Bay. In 1977, Abdul Latif established his restaurant, the Rupali, in the city centre of Newcastle upon Tyne. The restaurant was later renamed Curry Capital.

Abdul Latif offered free curry for five years to all service men and women who had served in Iraq, and free curry for life to rugby star Jonny Wilkinson and football manager Graeme Souness.

In 2004, his restaurant was also listed in Guinness World Records, for the world's longest-distance curry delivery – when he delivered frozen vegetable biryani and peshwari naan bread from Newcastle to Sydney, Australia. The delivery was made by motorcycle courier and aircraft and took four days. He featured regularly in the cult adult comic Viz, providing the staff with free curries and relishing the publicity, despite their portrayal of him as a "curry mentalist".

Abdul Latif purchased the deed to the honorary title of the Lord of Harpole for £5,000 in 1994, and proudly branded himself as Britain's first Bangladeshi Lord of the manor. He ran a website called The New Lord, where he offered souvenir merchandise, seasonal messages to his fans, publicity services and a motivational DVD. In 2003, he was also elected a Fellow of the Royal Society of the Arts for "his efforts to make a difference in society".

== Death ==
On 20 January 2008, Abdul Latif died of a heart attack at his home in Newcastle's Gosforth area.

An early day motion in Parliament proposed by Tim Farron Liberal Democrat MP was tabled on 24 January 2008 to offer condolences to his family and to celebrate "his enormous contribution to the City of Newcastle, the Liberal Democrats and Viz magazine."

On 2 March 2008, a well-attended memorial event was held at Newcastle Civic Centre.

== See also ==
- British Bangladeshi
- Business of British Bangladeshis
- List of British Bangladeshis
