= Jeff Woolf =

English inventor

Jeffrey Woolf born in Edgware, Middlesex, England on 17 September 1959, is an English inventor, journalist and innovation specialist. He is known as a lateral thinker and is a SFEDI Gold qualified innovation consultant.

Jeff Woolf OBE

He was awarded an OBE by Queen Elizabeth II at Buckingham Palace in 2001, for services to innovation and business. He is also a fellow of the Royal Society for the Encouragement of Arts, Manufactures and Commerce.

== Morpher ==
In 2011 Woolf noticed that by far the majority of cyclists on the London Barclays Cycle Hire scheme – now Santander Cycles – were riding without helmets. Woolf had had a bad cycle accident some years before on the road in Hampstead, London and, despite other injuries, firmly believed that a helmet saved his life.

Woolf commissioned a survey to find out why helmets were not more widely used and most cyclists said that they didn't use one because they felt that they were too cumbersome to carry around all day. Woolf set out to see if he could overcome the problem by designing a helmet that could fold flat and therefore be more portable. Morpher was the result. Partially funded with crowdfunding from Indiegogo, Morpher's funding campaign was greatly oversubscribed, raising more than $400,000 against a target of $35,000. Morpher was designed to surpass all relevant safety standards and was constructed of mainly recyclable materials. Morpher was aimed at all cyclists but eventually Woolf planned to market it to other users of sports safety helmets (skiers, skaters, snow boarders, hockey players, horse riders etc.). Morpher has patent protection in many territories around the globe. Morpher was produced in China and was first shipped to consumers in December 2015. Morpher raised further funds with two successful equity crowdfunding campaigns with Seedrs, firstly raising more than £1m in 2016 Seedrs' first raise and almost £4.5m with its second Seedrs campaign in 2019 Seedrs' second raise which resulted in a post raise valuation of more than £20m.

Morpher was one of Time Magazine's 25 best Inventions of 2016

Morpher was the recipient of Popular Science Magazine's Safety Invention of the Year 2014. This award was featured on CBS Morning Show.

Morpher also won the 2015 Edison Gold Award for Athletics and Recreation in New York City.

Morpher won the 2016 iF D&I Design award at the Taipei Cycle Show.

== MicroMap ==
In 1993 he developed the MicroMap System and oversaw the design and manufacture of this invention. MicroMap was invented to overcome the problems associated with handling large paper maps outdoors, especially when exposed to the elements. It was first conceived as a piste map for use when skiing. It consisted of credit-card sized miniaturised maps which fitted into the MicroMap viewer and were held in a precisely curved plane. The viewer had a moveable lens system which re-enlarged the MicroMap cards, allowing a user to have a clear view of the miniaturised information.

To save on assembly costs and handling difficulties, Woolf created an injection moulded lens that was moulded within its own hinged surround. This made assembly of the MicroMap viewer a far simpler process. He also developed systems to print miniaturised information onto credit cards at high resolutions of more than six million randomly placed and sized dots per square inch.

MicroMap and Woolf were discussed during a debate on innovation in the House of Commons. During this debate, a MicroMap viewer was handed around for members of parliament to use.

Woolf worked with Ron Hickman, inventor of the Black & Decker Workmate and designer of the Lotus Elan car, to some extent, benefiting from his patent experience before the final patent application was lodged. MicroMap was patented in many countries around the world.

There is a display on the development of MicroMap in the Science Museum in London. MicroMap was featured in the Millennium Dome and was awarded Millennium product status.

MicroMap cards were produced in conjunction with Ordnance Survey, the Automobile Association, USGS and Michelin. MicroMap was used by the SAS for bomb disposal and survival information.

== Journalism ==
Woolf is an occasional contributor to the media. He has had many prime time television, radio and webinar appearances where he has discussed matters relating to his inventions, innovation and new product development.

Woolf's article, 'Jamaica's Jewels' published in 2013 was nominated for 'Regional Publication Travel Feature of the Year' by McCluskey International on behalf of the Jamaican Tourist Board in the British Travel Press Awards.

He is a member of the National Union of Journalists and the Chartered Institute of Journalists.

== Awards ==
Woolf has been the recipient of a number of innovation / invention awards, including the Honeywell British Innovation Awards, Sunday Times British Invention of the Year, Carlton/NatWest British Enterprise Awards, Brussels Eureka, 50th Anniversary UNESCO Award for Innovation, Medaille du Ministére de l'Intèrieur de France, 4 x Gold INPEX awards (USA), Ordnance Survey/British Cartographic Society Award for Mapping Innovation & Design, 1st World Innovation Olympics, Millennium Product Status Award, Lord Mayor of London's "Best of the Best" Award. He was also awarded the Gold award from the Worshipful Company of Tallow Chandlers.

Woolf also worked on several other inventions, including Stackbuster (working title), a computerised paper filing system for the home. Stackbuster won innovation awards in the UK and in Belgium. Stackbuster won the double gold prize and Morpher won the Platinum prize in the 2010 British Invention of the Year Awards in October 2010. These two inventions also won Gold awards in the Brussels Eureka 2010 awards and Morpher was awarded a special award for best Transport product at Innova in November 2010.

== Additional information ==
Woolf has been involved in many fields as an inventor since the early 1980s, including home security, payment systems and children's safety devices.

He also has worked as a regular guest presenter on QVC, and has represented many well-known brands, including Canon, Sony, Panasonic, JVC, Samsung, Sharp, LG, Belkin, Lexmark, Elonex etc.

Woolf was chairman of the judging panel for the 2008 British Invention of the Year which was won by Bill Currie for his new riot shield design and was chairman of the judging panel for the World Innovation Awards in October 2009, 2010 and 2011 which were held at the British Innovation Show in London. He was also chairman of the judging panel for the (2012) World Innovation Awards, which was held at The Barbican in London in November 2012. He was chairman of the judging panel for these awards until 2019. There was no award in 2020 due to COVID-19. Woolf was a judge on the Science Museum's Smart Toy Awards and was also one of three judges (the other two being Buzz Aldrin and Edward de Bono) at the Saatchi & Saatchi World Innovation Awards.

Woolf spent much of the 1990s raising funds for his own companies. In 1998 he became responsible for running a £300m private equity fund, SGI Limited, in London UK, locating investment opportunities.

Woolf appears to be passionate about new technologies and has worked in the private sector as well as with the government in a rename of innovation matters. He has spoken on innovation at Cambridge University, The Institute of Directors, Universiti Putra Malaysia, Procter and Gamble, The BBC, The British Library and many other venues and events.

Woolf worked as the innovation specialist business advisor for Business Link in London and in this role helped inventors and SMEs with innovation matters. He held regular innovation surgeries at the British Library in London.
