= Women's Art Association of Saskatchewan =

- Formation: 1928
- Legal status: disbanded (1957)
- Purpose: promoting the art of women from Saskatchewan
- Headquarters: Regina, Saskatchewan
- Region served: Saskatchewan
- Official language: English
- Parent organization: Women's Art Association of Canada
- Affiliations: Moose Jaw Women's Art Association

The Women's Art Association of Saskatchewan (1928-1957) was a community organization of women artists and wives of the Regina art community, who were promoting Saskatchewan women's art locally and outside the province. Founded in 1928 by artists Barbara Barber, Sybil Henley Jacobson and Harriette Keating the association organized exhibitions and classes, often in collaboration with local art collector, Norman Mackenzie.

== Members ==
Everal Brown, who had grown up in Swift Current and taken painting as part of her primary education, was known to be another notable member. Clara Hume exhibited her works with the association.

== History ==
The association was involved in local art classes, which led to the creation of the Moose Jaw Art Guild (formerly the Moose Jaw Fine Art Guild) in 1949 by ten Moose Jaw women. In the Guild's early years, some members continued to meet with the Women's Art Association, and in 1950, the Guild even sent members' work to the National Women's Art Association of Canada Show in Toronto.

The Women's Art Association of Saskatchewan disbanded in 1957.
