= Angus Knowles-Cutler =

British businessman (born 1962)

- Born: 1 September 1962 (age 63); Bradford
- Education: Corpus Christi College, Cambridge
- Occupations: Vice-chairman, deloitte management consulting mergers and acquisitions
- Years active: 1985–present

Angus Knowles-Cutler (born 1 September 1962) is a British businessman and politician. He is currently vice-Chairman and London office managing partner at Deloitte, councilman representing Castle Baynard, London, and holds a number of other business leadership roles in London. He is known for his studies on the impact of technological advances on the UK labour market.

== Early life and education ==
Knowles-Cutler was born in Bradford on 1 September 1962, the son of Charles Knowles and Joyce (née Bradbury). He attended Bedford Modern School, and Luton Sixth Form College before receiving a scholarship to Corpus Christi College, Cambridge. He graduated in 1985 with an MA in History. He also studied in Osaka, Japan from 1987 to 1988 as a Monbusho scholar.

== Career ==
Angus Knowles-Cutler worked at Bain & Company, KPMG and Ernst & Young before joining Deloitte in 2001. He has served as vice-chairman of Deloitte since 2015 and was appointed chairman of Deloitte's UK-China practice in 2016. He leads Deloitte's M&A transactions practice, as well as the London Futures programme, focusing on regional economic growth.

He is currently commissioner of the London Skills Commission. In December 2016, he was appointed to the London Economic Action Partnership (LEAP) by London mayor Sadiq Khan, and currently serves as deputy chair.

Knowles-Cutler has served the City of London as a councilman since April 2017, representing Castle Baynard.

He has lectured on mergers and acquisition at a number of business schools including London Business School and the China Europe International Business School (CEIBS) in Shanghai.

== Works and awards ==
He coauthored a 2014 report in the UK Futures Programme, Agiletown: the relentless march of technology and London’s response.

Knowles-Cutler was a primary contributor to the 2015 report, From brawn to brains: The impact of technology on jobs in the UK discussing the impact of technology, automation, artificial intelligence and robotics on the future of the British workplace, and the economic, social and political implications. This report received the Management Consultancies Association's 2017 award for Best Use of Thought Leadership.

== See also ==
- List of Fellows of the Royal Society of Arts
