= Iain Osborne =

British marketer

Iain Osborne FRSA
- Born: 1957 (age 68–69); Ayr, Scotland
- Education: University of Edinburgh; Heriot-Watt University; INSEAD
- Occupation: Global marketer
- Years active: 1978 - present
- Known for: First Marketing Director at Yahoo! Europe; Co-founder and Managing Director of chello broadband WiFi launch across Europe
- Children: 4
- Awards: Opportunity Japan - Service Industry Success Award (1991); Best New Media Brand (1997); Best European ISP (1999); Internet Superstar (1999); Marketing Innovator of the Year - World Wide Groundbreaker Award (2000); FRSA (2016)
- Website: https://www.linkedin.com/in/helloiain/

Iain William Leonard Osborne (born 1957) is a British marketer. Osborne was the first marketing director at Yahoo! Europe, where he popularised the usage of the nascent World Wide Web. Later, Osborne was co-founder and managing director at chello broadband, which he grew from startup to being the leading broadband ISP outside North America, creating a new vision for and transformation of the world's digital economies. Awards include Best New Media Brand, Best European ISP, Internet Superstar and Ground Breaker Award - International Marketing Innovator of the year.

== Early life and education ==
Osborne was born in Ayr in 1957 to Matthew and Anne Osborne and grew up in Ayrshire on the west coast of Scotland. He attended Belmont Academy before going on to study social sciences at The University of Edinburgh receiving a B.Sc. in 1978. He studied German Commercial Law at London School of Economics on a scholarship from Deutscher Akademischer Austauschdienst. He then went on to post-graduate studies in European Marketing and Languages at Heriot-Watt University in 1979. Later in his career, he attended INSEAD, France, on a Courtaulds Scholarship.

== Career ==
After postgraduate, he joined the graduate training programme of Clarks in 1979. He since held various senior sales and marketing positions in Bata Retail Europe, L'Oreal, Courtaulds PLC before joining Hilton as Director of Product and Brands in 1990.

=== Internet Years ===
In 1997, Osborne joined startup Yahoo! Europe management as the first Marketing Director. During this time and on a startup budget, Yahoo! grew to become the most popular Internet Brand and website across Europe. Osborne and Heather Killen conducted and presented the industry's first European consumer research on Internet Users that ultimately established the commercial potential of Online Advertising in Europe.

Osborne went on to become co-founder and managing director of Chello Broadband NV, the first commercial ISP to introduce high speed Broadband Internet Access in 6 European countries. Also at chello, he led some of the very early research into broadband usage and its impact on changing lifestyles in Europe.

Osborne founded Innovater BV that in 2003 led the launch of WiFi across Europe on behalf of the Industry Association Wi-Fi Alliance of Redwood, CA. Subsequently, in 2003, he founded VONOS, a company dedicated to Voice and Video over broadband services. He later joined XS4ALL to run the VoIP digital telephony services.
