= Screen Academy Scotland =

Film initiative based in Edinburgh, Scotland

The Screen Academy Scotland (A Skillset Film Academy) is a collaboration between Edinburgh Napier University and Edinburgh College of Art. It was opened in August 2005 by the then First Minister of Scotland, Jack McConnell, and is based in Edinburgh, Scotland. Both Edinburgh Napier and ECA had already established film making courses. Napier's combined photography and film undergraduate BA launched Cannes prizewinner Lynne Ramsay on her journey to film directing. The Academy offers practical, project-based, postgraduate courses. A new Production Centre was opened in August 2006 by Napier Honorary Graduate Tilda Swinton. The Academy's first Director is Robin MacPherson FRSA, a BAFTA-nominated producer and formerly Development Executive for Scottish Screen, now Professor of Screen Media at Edinburgh Napier University, where he is also Director of its Institute for Creative Industries and a board member of Creative Scotland.

Sir Sean Connery, Brian Cox and Dame Judi Dench are patrons of the Academy.

The Academy is one of three UK centres of excellence in film practice education recognised by Creative Skillset (the Sector Skills Council for Creative Media) as a Skillset Film Academy. In November 2008 the Academy at Edinburgh Napier University was admitted to full membership of CILECT, the association of the world's major film and television schools. The Academy regularly hosts masterclasses and guest lectures by prominent industry figures, recent examples of which include 'Trainspotting' and '28 Days Later' producers Andrew MacDonald and Iain Smith (who is also a member of the Screen Academy Board) as well as Iranian Director Seyyed Reza Mir-karimi.

Films by Academy graduates have won numerous prizes and been screened at festivals worldwide including Venice, Kolkata, Tribeca and Beijing. Students or graduates of the Academy have won the Page Screenwriting Awards Gold Prize for Short Film in three of the past four years, the most recent winner being Amy Rich in 2010. Michael Cumes took the Gold Prize in 2009 with The Romance Class. In 2007, David Bishop won with Danny’s Toy’s. Chico Pereira's feature documentary 'Pablo's Winter' won Best Student Documentary at IDFA in 2012 and the President's Award at the Full Frame Festival in 2013.

In addition to offering a range of degree programmes, the Academy also hosts professional summer schools such as 'The Soundtrack', in partnership with industry training partners such as The School of Sound, its journalism programmes are accredited by the Broadcast Journalism Training Council (BJTC).

In 2007 and every year since, the Academy was awarded funding by the EU MEDIA programme for its international writer, director and producer development programme ENGAGE which is a collaboration with the National Film School of Ireland, the Baltic Film and Media School, Tallinn, Estonia and Aalto University in Finland. The programme runs on an annual basis with workshops in each of the partner countries. In 2011, the ENGAGE partnership was awarded EU MEDIA MUNDUS funding to extend its programme to include non-EU countries including Canada, China and India.

== Alumni ==
Notable alumni of Screen Academy Scotland include writer Lin Anderson and filmmaker Basil Khalil.
