= Amir Ali Majid =

Pakistani legal scholar and writer

Amir Ali Majid is a former judge, legal scholar and author born in Gojra, Punjab, Pakistan.

== Biography ==
Majid worked as a senior lecturer at London Guildhall University before being appointed as a part-time immigration adjudicator in the late 1990s. This made him the second blind judge in Great Britain.

In 2003, he met with Pakistan's president Pervez Musharraf to discuss disability rights in the country.

In August 2017, the Upper Tribunal reviewed several of his cases while he was working as a First-tier Tribunal judge. This review was sparked because many of his decisions had resulted in successful appeals due to substantially similar, short decisions that lacked reasons for the decision and references to the law or the facts of the cases. They determined that the decisions all showed errors, "in most cases multiple serious errors," that raised doubt about Majid's legal knowledge and understanding of a judge's role. They considered the impact of his blindness but found that it would not explain the errors.

Majid retired in December 2017.
