= Richard Lindsay Nicholson =

Royal Navy officer

Captain Richard Lindsay Nicholson DSO
- Nicholson in 1920
- Born: 29 October 1882; Delhi, Punjab, British India
- Died: 1 November 1940 (aged 58); Kensington, London, England
- Military career
- Allegiance: United Kingdom
- Branch: Royal Navy
- Service years: 1898–1927
- Rank: Captain
- Conflicts: World War I; Battle of Jutland
- Awards: Distinguished Service Order (DSO)

Richard Lindsay Nicholson DSO (29 October 1882 – 1 November 1940) was a British captain of the Royal Navy. He served in World War I and is known for being a member of the Chief of Staff of HMS Iron Duke which served as the fleet flagship during the Battle of Jutland.

== Military career ==
Richard Lindsay Nicholson was born on 29 October 1882 in New Delhi. He began his military career on 15 January 1898. He was promoted to Lieutenant on 15 August 1904 and to Lieutenant-Commander on 15 August 1912. After the British entry into World War I, Nicholson served on HMS Iron Duke on 4 August 1914 and served in the ship's chief of staff. A year later Nicholson was promoted to commander on 31 December 1915. After participating in the Battle of Jutland, Nicholson was praised for his wireless telegraph work and the organisation of it on 15 September 1916. Richard then served as the Director of Signal Division on 5 January 1918. After the war's conclusion, Nicholson was placed on the Retirement list at his own request and ultimately promoted to captain in 1927. On 9 July 1926 Nicholson became a Fellow of the Royal Society of Arts at the Annual General Meeting that year.
