= Sybil Henley Jacobson =

Canadian painter

Sybil Jacobson
- Born: July 21, 1881; London, England
- Died: November 4, 1953 (aged 72) near Vancouver, British Columbia
- Education: Hastings & St. Leonards Municipal School of Science and Art (London), Lambeth School of Science (London), Royal Academy Schools (London).
- Known for: Painter of portraits and landscape

Sybil Henley Jacobson (née Atkinson), (July 21, 1881 – November 4, 1953) was a Canadian painter. Her oil and watercolour paintings of prairie landscapes, portraits, and still life, although traditional, evoke her subjects with precision and sensitivity. She was a founding member of the Saskatoon Art Club (1925) and one of the ten founding members of the Women's Art Association of Saskatchewan (1929).

== Career ==
Born in London, England, Jacobson was the daughter of Edward and Lucy Atkinson. She had two sisters and a brother. She studied at the Hastings and St. Leonard's Municipal School of Science, at Lambeth School of Science and Art, and for three years at the Royal Academy, the latter two in London, England. While at the Royal Academy Schools, Jacobson studied with John Singer Sargent. During her years of study she was also taught by Sir Lawrence Alma-Tadema, Sir George Clausen, Ernest Crofts, and Sir Frank Dicksee.

Jacobson studied afterwards in Paris and in 1907, married Percy John Henley, an English art student and sculptor she had met there. She and Henley emigrated to Saskatchewan to farm on land in Elfros, Saskatchewan in 1914 but Henley was sick and died in the hospital at Wynyard in 1917. Around 1918, she began to live with Dr. Johann Sigurdir Jacobson, an Icelandic emigrant who had his practise in Wnyard. Due to their irregular relationship (Jacobson was already married with children), they moved to the North Dakota where they had two children together, Johanna born in 1919 and Jacob born in 1921.

After the birth of their children, the Jacobsons went back to rural Saskatoon, living in various locations. Sybil worked as an art teacher in Saskatoon in 1925, had a show Nutana Collegiate Memorial Art Gallery, Saskatoon in 1926 and in the summers taught students at Lac Vert Nord. She was one of the ten founding members of the Women's Art Association of Saskatchewan (1928) and had a studio in Moose Jaw, Saskatchewan in 1932.

The Jacobsons moved to Winnipeg where they married in 1935, a year before Jacobson died. She then moved to Vancouver in 1936 and worked at the Canadian Institute of Associated Arts, Vancouver, B.C. from 1937 to 1938. Sybil Jacobson died in Surrey, British Columbia, Canada in 1953.

Her work is found in public collections such as the Remai Modern, Saskatoon; the Norman Mackenzie Art Gallery, Regina; the Moose Jaw Art Museum and National Exhibition Centre; and Nutana Collegiate as well as in the collection of the Government of Saskatchewan and private collections.

== Group exhibitions ==
- 1926: Nutana Collegiate Memorial Art Gallery, Saskatoon;
- 1930: Moose Jaw Women's Art Association, Provincial Art Exhibition;
- 1937–1940: Vancouver Art Gallery Annual B.C. Artists' Exhibition;
- 1940s (1944?): John Britnell Art Gallery, Toronto; (Note: In 1945, she exhibited a work at the Vancouver Art Gallery titled Christmas in Toronto 1944 so she probably was in Toronto at that date, likely for her show there.)
- 1945–1946: Vancouver Art Gallery Annual B.C. Artists' Exhibition;
- 1966: Mendel Art Gallery, Saskatoon, Nutana Collegiate Memorial Art Gallery Collection;
- 1971: MacKenzie Art Gallery, Regina, Saskatchewan: Art and Artists
