= Diplôme d'études supérieures appliquées =

The Diplôme d'Études Supérieures Appliquées (DESA), in which the final word is also variously Approfondies or Avancées, is an advanced educational degree that was awarded in France and other Francophone countries. It was an intermediate degree between the Licence awarded after university study, and the advanced degree of Doctorat.

== Footnote ==
- Diplôme d'études supérieures appliquées translates literally as "Graduate Diploma in Applied Studies", although no officially recognized or commonly used English translation of the diploma title has been identified.

== See also ==
- DEA
- Licence
- Doctorat
