= Joss Garman =

British environmentalist and humanitarian campaigner

Joss Garman (born 1985) is a British environmental and humanitarian campaigner who has worked as a campaign leader for Greenpeace UK, and as a director of The Syria Campaign. At the Institute for Public Policy Research he worked as associate director for energy, transport and climate change before becoming adviser to the UK Shadow Secretary of State for Energy & Climate Change Lisa Nandy MP.

== Education ==
Born in Radnorshire, Mid-Wales, he attended his local comprehensive school before going on to read Politics at SOAS, University of London.

== Family ==
His father, David Garman, was the inventor of the world's first bath lift and in 2015 was appointed an OBE for services to the healthcare industry.

== Activism ==
In August 2007, ahead of the Camp for Climate Action, Garman was named in a High Court injunction by airport operator BAA in a bid to prevent environmental protests at Heathrow.
