= Claire Watt-Smith =

English entrepreneur

Claire Watt-Smith (born 1984) is an English entrepreneur.

Watt-Smith studied at Royal Holloway, University of London, gaining a BSc in Management Studies with French in 2005 and a Masters in European Business and Spanish in 2006. At the age of 25, Watt-Smith founded BoBelle a luxury accessories company, in 2009. The headquarters are in Somerset House, London.

In 2008, Watt-Smith was named one of the "Future 100 Young Entrepreneurs Of The Year". She has taken part in the Inspire & Mentor campaign of the magazine Marie Claire, in association with The Prince's Trust. In 2010, Watt-Smith was selected as one of 35 high-flying women featured by Management Today. She has been featured in magazines including Business Review, Cosmopolitan, Eve, Look, and Style.
