= Vong Phaophanit and Claire Oboussier =

London Based Artist

Vong Phaophanit
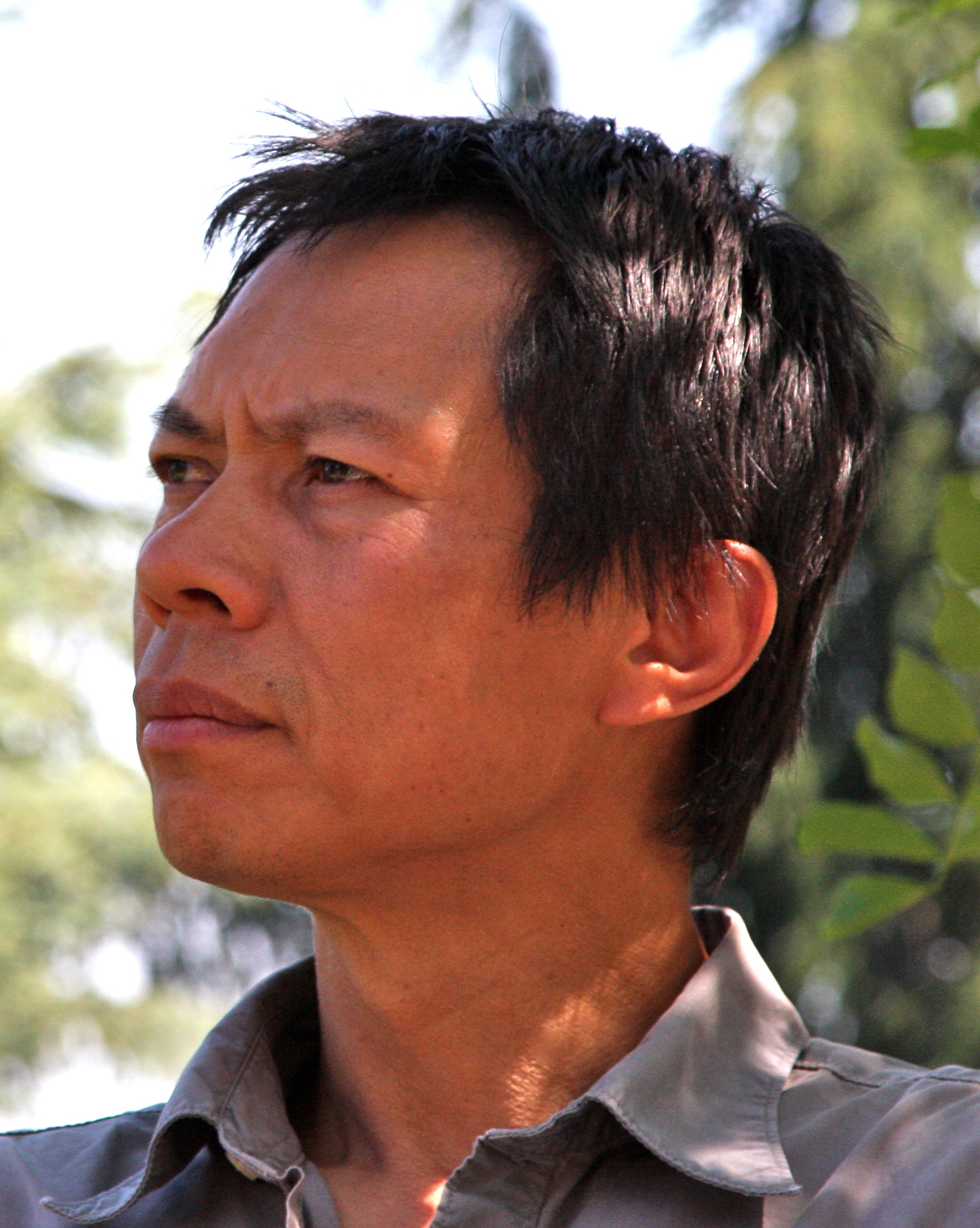
- Born: Laos
- Education: Ecole des Beaux Arts Aix-en-Provence, France
- Known for: Installation art, Art in public space, sculpture, video art

Claire Oboussier
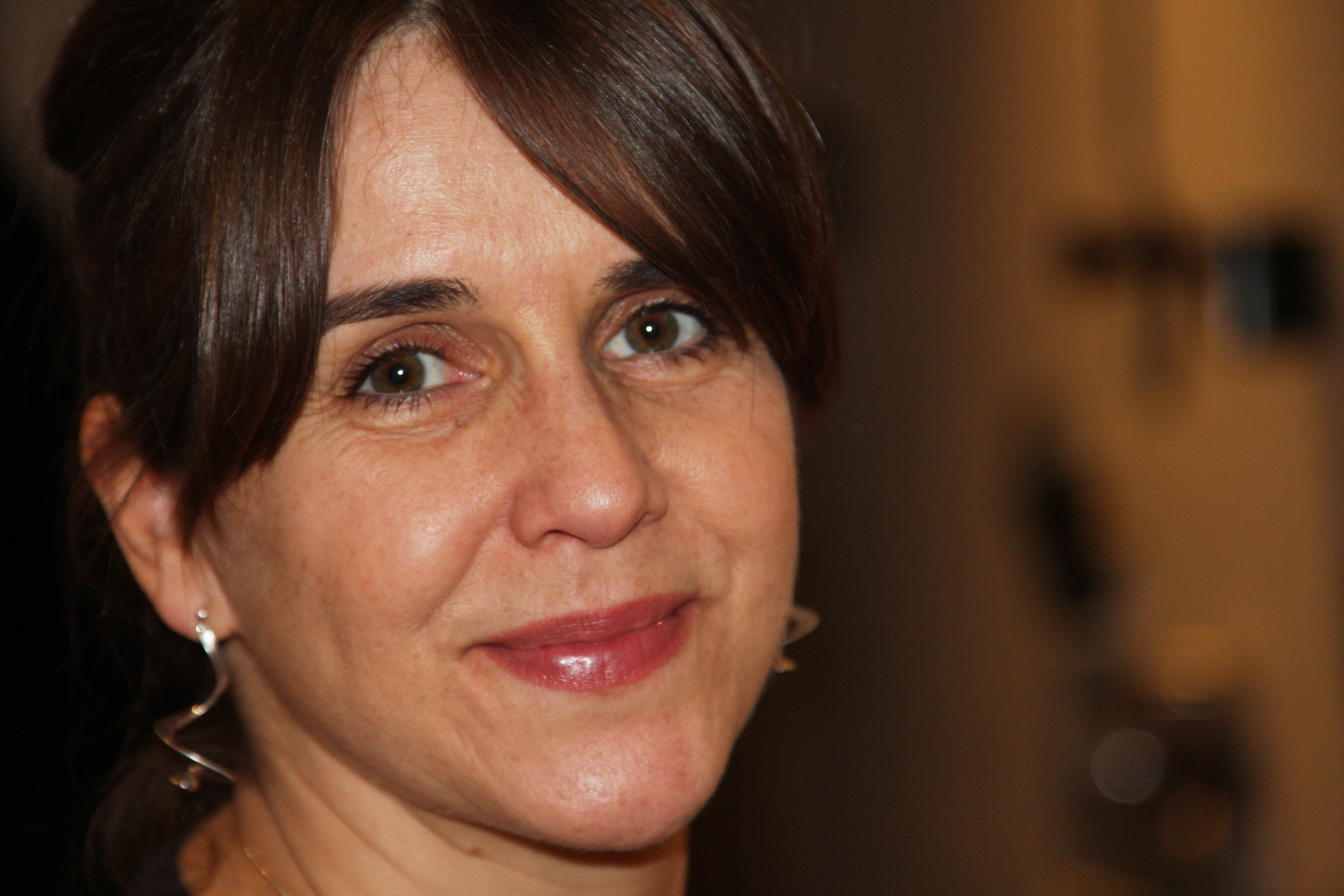
- Born: London
- Education: Sussex University, University of Bristol, UK
- Known for: Art in public space, Installation art, sculpture, video art

Vong Phaophanit (born 1961, Laos) and Claire Oboussier (born 1963, London) are artists based in London who have collaborated for the past 25 years. Their studio encompasses a wide variety of media including films, books, large-scale installations and photographic and sculptural works. They have created a number of major public commissions.

== Biographies ==
=== Vong Phaophanit ===
Phaophanit was born in Savannakhet, Laos in 1961. He was educated in Paris and later studied at the Ecole des Beaux Arts, Aix en Provence, in France.

=== Claire Oboussier ===
Oboussier was born in London, placed in care and adopted, and subsequently grew up in Devon. She graduated from the University of Sussex in 1986 (BA (Hons)) and the University of Bristol in 1994 (PhD).

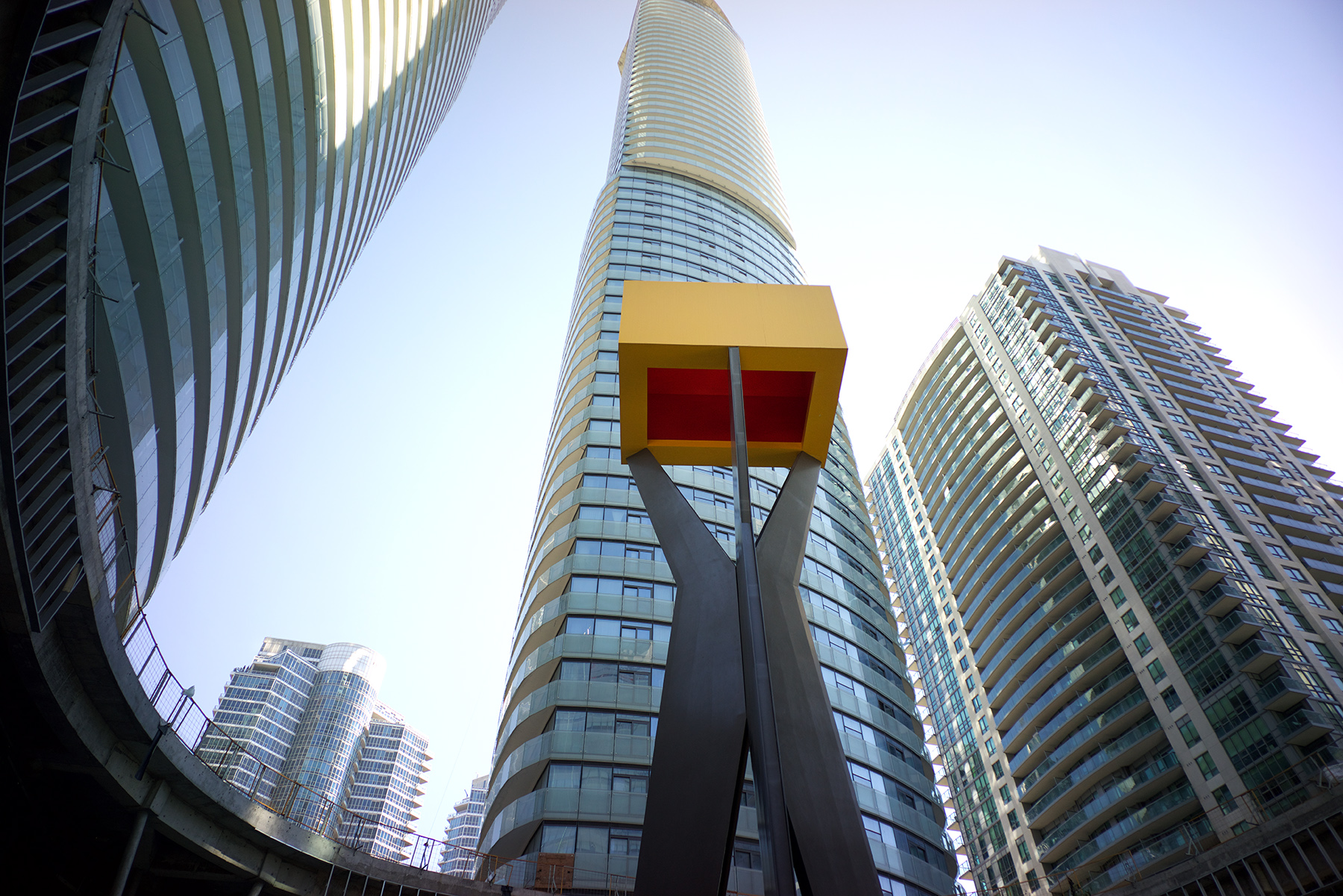
Dream House 2015 Toronto by Vong Phaophanit and Claire Oboussier

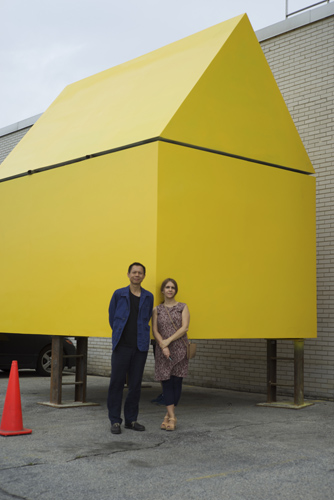
Dream House 2015 Toronto by Vong Phaophanit and Claire Oboussier

=== Vong Phaophanit and Claire Oboussier Studio ===
Vong Phaophanit (b.1961 Laos) and Claire Oboussier (b.1963 London) have worked collaboratively for over 25 years alongside their independent studio practices. Their collective work includes large-scale installations and sculptural works, films, books, and socially engaged public commissions. It explores issues of language, memory, deterritorialisation and forms of meaning making that exceed national, cultural and social borders. In 1993 Phaophanit was nominated for the Turner Prize. He presented the renowned work 'Neon Rice Field' (collection of the TATE). In the same year he took part in the Venice Biennale (Aperto). In 1994 he was awarded the DAAD fellowship in Berlin where the duo subsequently relocated. During their time in Berlin, Phaophanit and Oboussier produced 'Atopia' (Berliner Künstlerprogramm DAAD, 2003) in response to the transitioning cultural, political and physical landscape of the city. In 2004 they created the video work 'All that's solid melts into air (Karl Marx)’ (collection of the TATE), part of 'The Quiet in the Land', a pioneering transnational arts project in Luang Prabang, Lao PDR. The work explores the precariousness of language and memory and the role they have in constructing both national and personal identities and engages with the "instability and ephemerality of meaning, it’s fluctuation across time and languages" *

Phaophanit and Oboussier have produced a number of groundbreaking public commissions including 'Outhouse' (2004) for Liverpool Housing Action Trust, a sculptural glass 'abode' sited within a public park for the collective use of local residents. In 2008 they were selected for the Channel 4 Big Art Project for which they proposed 'Northern Light' – a suspended architectural work for North Belfast, again conceived for the collective use of local communities. Other key works in public space include neon installations such as 'Topography of Dreams' (2007), Curzon Street Station, Birmingham and 'Light Curtain' for Hull Truck Theatre (2009). 'Light of Day' was created for the Neo-Natal Baby Unit at St Georges Hospital in London in 2010 and 'Coronium' (2011) for Kilden, the New Performing Arts Centre in Kristiansand, Norway. In 2012, as part of the Cultural Olympiad, they were commissioned to make 'Light Veils', a permanent laser installation for Weymouth Seafront and a legacy work for the town.

In 2011 Phaophanit and Oboussier completed 'Mute Meadow' on the banks of the River Foyle in Derry, Northern Ireland - a major socially engaged public work commissioned as part of the 'post-conflict' re-imagining of the city. In 2015 they installed 'Dream House', a public sculpture commission for downtown Toronto that explores diasporic notions of home and belonging. Their most recent project 'IT IS AS IF' (2015), is an immersive video installation produced at Block 336 in Brixton, London. Funded by the Wellcome Trust, the work is an experimental collaboration between the artists and surgeon Professor Roger Kneebone (Imperial College, London), investigating the unspoken languages of medical surgery and extending their commitment to engaged practice, inter-disciplinary dialogue and their interest in non-narrative, trans-cultural forms of meaning.

Collectively and individually Phaophanit and Oboussier have worked with many galleries nationally such as the Tate Gallery, London, Serpentine Gallery, London, The Henry Moore Institute, Leeds, The Chisenhale Gallery, London, Ikon Gallery Birmingham, Spacex Gallery, Exeter and The Angel Row Gallery, Nottingham as well as internationally with others including The South African National Gallery, Cape Town, Queensland Art Gallery, Brisbane, DAAD Gallery, Berlin, Martin-Gropius-Bau, Berlin, Göteborgs Konsthall, Sweden, National Gallery of Canada, Ottawa, The Irish Museum of Modern Art, Dublin, the Shanghai Biennale, the 55th International Short Film Festival Oberhausen, Germany and The Museo Nacional Centro de Arte Reina Sofía, Madrid.

Phaophanit and Oboussier live and work in London.

- (Tate Gallery exhibition text, 2008)
