= Clare Henry =

British art critic and curator (born 1942)

- Known for: Art critic, Curator, Broadcaster, Printmaker
- Spouse: Phillip A Bruno

Clare Henry FRSA (born 21 February 1942) is a British art critic, curator, columnist, TV presenter and printmaker who has been based in Scotland and New York. She was The Glasgow Herald's chief art critic. In 2000 she reviewed art exhibitions in North America for the Financial Times.

== Life and career ==
Henry was born in Sheffield in England. She attended Queen Elizabeth's Academy which is in Nottinghamshire. and graduated in Fine Art from Reading University. She worked as a researcher for the Paul Mellon Foundation for British Art. During the 1970s she was involved with the Glasgow Print Studio, latterly as Chairman.

Henry was chief art critic for The Herald from 1980 to 2000. During this period she would write on average four articles per week with an emphasis on Scottish art. From 2000 she was chief American art critic for the Financial Times until 2008, based in New York.

In 1983 Henry curated an exhibition for the UK arts festival, Britain Salutes New York. This led to a series of curatorial projects including one at London's Serpentine in 1985, Edinburgh Festival in 1986, selecting "The Vigorous Imagination" exhibition at the Scottish National Gallery of Modern Art in 1987, which culminated in 1990 when she was curator for Scotland at the 44th Venice Biennale. In 2013 Henry donated her 30-year archive of original drafts to Glasgow School of Art. Henry's archive of work is online at Scottish Art Archive.

She married Phillip A Bruno, an American gallery director in 2002 at St. Peters Church in New York.

== Legacy ==
Henry has donated a large collection of papers, ephemera and photographs covering the period from 1981 to 1999 to the archives of the Glasgow School of Art.
