= Vong Phaophanit =

British artist (born 1961)

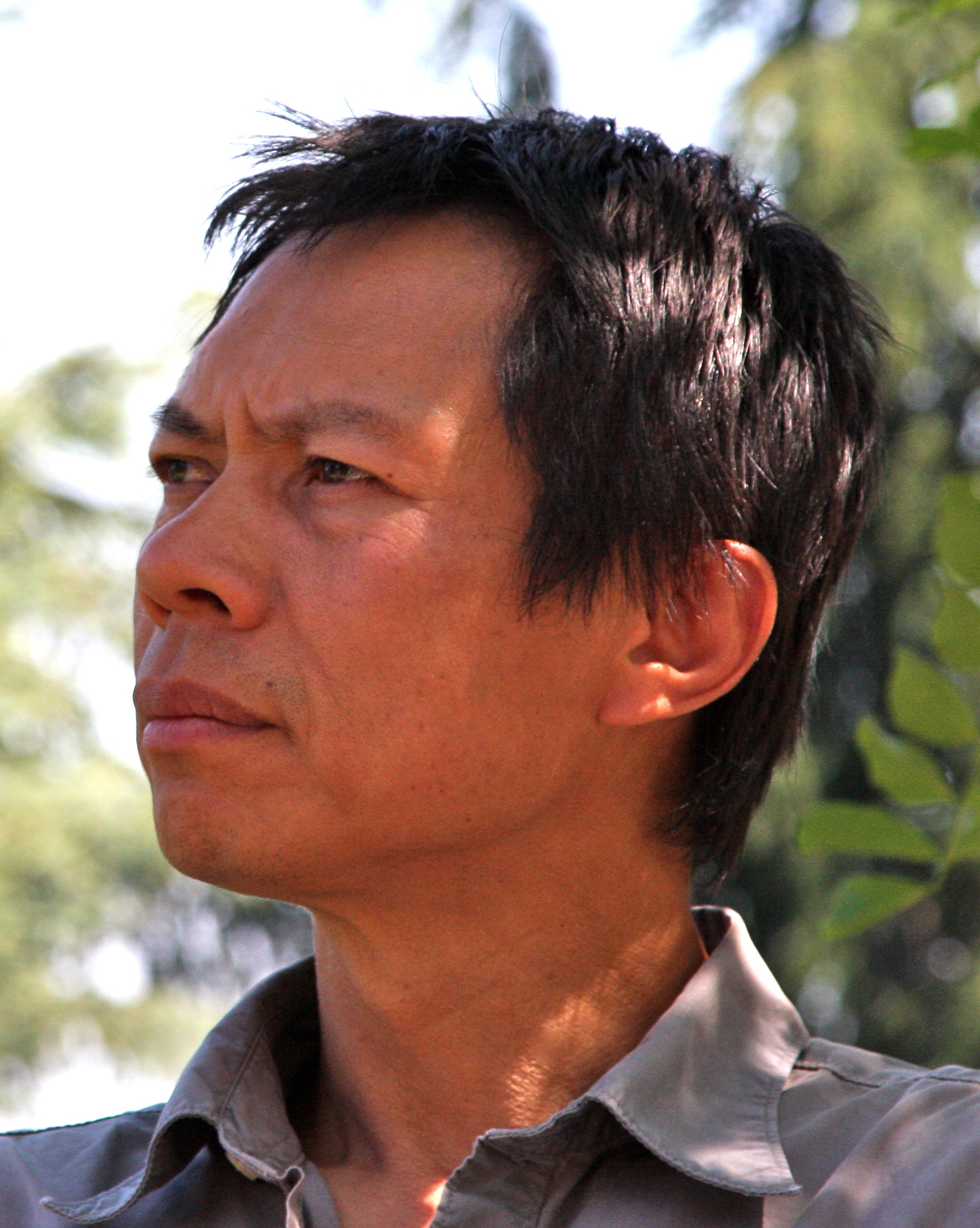
- Phaophanit in 2008
- Born: 1961 (age 64–65); Savannakhet, Laos
- Education: École des Beaux-Arts
- Occupation: Artist
- Spouse: Claire Oboussier

Vong Phaophanit (born 1961) is a Laotian-born British artist based in London. Phaophanit is best known for his large-scale installations, which incorporate a wide range of materials including ash, silk, rice, rubber, wax and often light.

== Biography ==
Born in Savannakhet, Laos in 1961, Vong Phaophanit was educated in Paris and later studied at the Ecole des Beaux Arts, Aix en Provence, in France. He met and married Claire Oboussier while they were both still students.

He moved to the UK in 1985 and became a British citizen in 1993.

== Career ==
In the UK, he began to experiment with a wide range of media subsequently exhibiting widely nationally and internationally.

He has been a visiting lecturer at Chelsea College of Art, Wimbledon School of Art, the University of East London and Exeter College of Art and Design, and was also senior fellow in drawing at Wimbledon School of Art.

== Awards ==
In 1993 he was short-listed for the Turner Prize, and in 1994 was awarded the DAAD fellowship in Berlin.

In 1998 he was nominated for the Paul Hamlyn Prize and in 2002 was the award winner of the Art and Work Award for site-specific work with Gensler Architects.

== Collections ==
His work is held in major collections around the world including the Tate Britain, London; The Irish Museum of Modern Art, Dublin; The British Council Collection, London; and The Arts Council Collection, London.

== Exhibitions ==
His work was exhibited at the Third Asia-Pacific Triennial of Contemporary Art, Brisbane, Australia, 1999; Shanghai Biennale 2004; Void Gallery in Derry in 2005; The Quiet in the Land, Luang Prabang in 2006; and Gropius Bau, Berlin ("The Tropics") in 2008.
