= Kevin A. Morrison =

American historian

Kevin A. Morrison FRHistS FRSA FRAS SFHEA

Academic background
- Education: Rice University (PhD); University of Chicago (MA)
- Thesis: Inhabiting Liberalism: Politics, Culture, and the Spaces of Masculine Professionalism, 1823–1903 (2009)
- Doctoral advisor: Helena Michie and Robert L. Patten

Academic work
- Institutions: Henan University
- Main interests: Victorian era
- Website: https://www.kevinamorrison.com

Kevin Alexander Morrison (born June 1976) is an American cultural historian living in China. His research includes 19th-century political cultures and popular literature, British Empire, East India Company, and transnationalism. Since January 2019, he has been Henan Provincial Chair Professor and university Distinguished professor of British literature in the School of Foreign Languages at Henan University, Kaifeng, China. He is a general editor of journal Cultural History, President of the Society for Global Nineteenth-Century Studies, Editor-in-Chief of journal Global Nineteenth-Century Studies, and Co-editor of book series Studies in the Global Nineteenth Century Book Series. Morrison hold elected fellowships in the Royal Society of Arts, the Royal Asiatic Society, and the Royal Historical Society.

== Academic career ==
He received his PhD in English from the Rice University in 2009. Between 2009 and 2018, Morrison taught at the Syracuse University. He was Visiting Fellow at National University of Singapore (2018) and Lynn Wood Neag Distinguished Visiting Professor at University of Connecticut (2020).

== Works ==
=== Single-authored monographs ===
- The Provincial Fiction of Mitford, Gaskell, and Eliot (Edinburgh University Press, 2023)
- Study Abroad Pedagogy, Dark Tourism, and Historical Reenactment: In the Footsteps of Jack the Ripper and His Victims (Palgrave Macmillan, 2019)
- Victorian Liberalism and Material Culture: Synergies of Thought and Place (Edinburgh University Press, 2018)
- A Micro-History of Victorian Liberal Parenting: John Morley's "Discreet Indifference" (Palgrave Macmillan, 2018)

=== Single-edited books ===
- Victorian Pets and Poetry (Routledge, 2023)
- Encyclopedia of London's East End (McFarland, 2023)
- Historical Research, Creative Writing, and the Past: Methods of Knowing (Routledge, 2023)
- Political and Sartorial Styles: Britain and Its Colonies in the Long Nineteenth Century ( Manchester University Press, 2023)
- Victorian Culture and Experiential Learning: Historical Encounters in the Classroom (Palgrave Macmillan, 2022)
- Making the Grade: Reimagining the Graduate Seminar Essay in Literary Studies (Rowman & Littlefield, 2021)
- Critical Edition of The Silence of Dean Maitland by Maxwell Gray (Cambridge Scholars Publishing, 2019)
- Walter Besant: The Business of Literature and the Pleasures of Reform (Liverpool University Press, 2019)
- Companion to Victorian Popular Fiction (McFarland, 2018)
- Affections and Domesticities: Writings on Victorian Family Life (Cognella Academic Publishing, 2016)
- Children of Gibeon: A Critical Edition of a Novel by Walter Besant (Cognella Academic Publishing, 2015)
- All Sorts and Conditions of Men: A Critical Edition of a Novel by Walter Besant (Victorian Secrets, 2012)
