= John R. Hall =

John R. Hall may refer to:

- John Hall (American businessman), chairman and CEO of Ashland Inc.
- John Roulstone Hall (1826–1911), American architect
- John Hall (priest) (born 1949), English priest of the Church of England
- John Robert Hall III (born 1975), American author and co-founder of Greenwood & Hall
- John R. Hall (sociologist) (born 1946), American sociologist, author, professor
- John Reeves Hall, games programmer at Loki Software, writer of The book Programming Linux Games
