= Robin MacPherson =

Robin MacPherson (born 1959, Glasgow, Scotland) is a filmmaker and was Chair in Creative Industries at the University of the Highlands and Islands before retiring. Previously, he was Professor of Screen Media at Edinburgh Napier University, director of Screen Academy Scotland (a Creative Skillset Film Academy partnership with Edinburgh College of Art) and of the Institute for Creative Industries at Edinburgh Napier.

Educated at Garthamlock Secondary School, Glasgow, and at the University of Stirling, he entered the film and television industry in 1989, as a producer at Edinburgh Film Workshop Trust where he made documentary, current affairs, and drama, including the BAFTA-nominated half-hour drama, The Butterfly Man. In 1997, he established Asylum Pictures, an independent production company whose films include the Scottish-BAFTA nominated documentary, Tree Fellers, and (as co-producer) the award-winning Fellini: I'm a born liar.

After two years as Development Executive at Scottish Screen in 2002, he joined Edinburgh Napier University where, in 2005, he became the first Director of Screen Academy Scotland. From 2008 to 2015, he led ENGAGE, an EU MEDIA-funded collaboration with the Irish, Estonian and Finnish national film schools.

In 2010, he was appointed by the Scottish Government to the Board of Creative Scotland. on which he served until July 2015. In 2011, he was appointed as Director of the Institute for Creative Industries at Edinburgh Napier University. From 2011 to 2015, he was a member of the Board of Creative Edinburgh.
