= Alan Pipes =

Alan Pipes (born 19 March 1947 in Bury, Lancashire, England) is a British writer on art, product design and graphic design.

== Biography ==
He studied physics at the University of Surrey, in Battersea and worked in print publishing, notably as Managing Editor of Computer-Aided Design journal (1977–82), published by IPC Science and Technology Press (then Butterworth-Heinemann), and editor of CadCam International (1982–85), published by EMAP, before becoming a freelance writer in 1985.

Pipes's college textbooks have become standards in their field, with Production For Graphic Designers currently in its 5th printing. Also known as Fred Pipes or Alan (Fred) Pipes (so named after his resemblance to Freddie Garrity singer with the Manchester band Freddie and the Dreamers), he is also a cartoon illustrator, an artist and printmaker, exhibiting regularly in the Brighton, Adur and Worthing Artists Open House festivals since 1996. He has been a committee member of the Brighton Illustrators Group since 1990 and has been webmaster of Channel 4's archaeology television programme Time Team since 1998. He is a Fellow of the Royal Society of Arts.

Pipes also catalogues short, unusual and misplaced cycle lanes on a website, Weird Cycle Lanes. According to an article about it in The Daily Telegraph, 'Some people collect stamps, some people collect beermats, but Alan Pipes collects unusual cycle lanes. He's already acquired a cult following on the South Coast with his web-gallery of improbable, impractical and sometimes impassable bits of municipal road-marking. Now he's expanding his search nationwide to try to find Britain's most ludicrous bus and cycle lanes.'

== Published work ==
As author:

- Pipes, Alan (17 October 2011). How to Design Websites. Laurence King. ISBN 978-1-85669-739-2. OCLC 719428980.
- Pipes, Alan (25 July 1991). Drawing for 3-Dimensional Design. Brown & Benchmark. ISBN 0-697-13945-X. OCLC 26470033.
- Pipes, Alan (20 October 2005). Production for Graphic Designers, 4th Edition. Overlook Press. ISBN 978-1-85669-601-2. OCLC 62860548. 5th edition. US edition published by Prentice Hall. ISBN 978-0-205-68479-3
- Pipes, Alan (1 February 2004). Foundations of Art and Design. Laurence King. ISBN 1-85669-375-9. OCLC 53459836. (2nd edition 2008).
- Pipes, Alan (1 August 2008). Introduction to Design, 2nd Edition. Prentice Hall. ISBN 978-0-13-208511-3. OCLC 212893712.
- Pipes, Alan (9 August 2007). Drawing for Designers. Laurence King. ISBN 978-1-85669-533-6. OCLC 124981695.. Reviewed in Design Week, July 19, 2007.

In translation:

- Pipes, Alan (2011). Diseño de sitios web. Promopress. ISBN 978-84-92810-26-0.
- Pipes, Alan (2011). Concevoir un Site Web: L'idée et la Forme. Pyramyd NTCV. ISBN 978-2-35017-243-9.
- Pipes, Alan (2008). Dibujo para disenadores. Art Blume SL, Barcelona. ISBN 978-84-9801-250-7.
- Pipes, Alan (2008). Zeichnen fur Designer. Steibner Verlag GmbH, Munchen. ISBN 978-3-8307-1347-0. OCLC 226296206.
- Pipes, Alan (1991). Design Tridimensionale. Tecniche Nuove, Milano. ISBN 88-7081-686-9.
- Pipes, Alan (1990). Production for graphic designers. Liu Ho, China. ISBN 957-0384-18-2.
- Pipes, Alan (1990). Zeichnen fur Designer. Augustus Verlag, Augsburg. ISBN 3-8043-2735-4. OCLC 231001676.
- Pipes, Alan (1989). El diseno tridimensional. Editorial Gustavo Gili, Barcelona. ISBN 84-252-1416-5. OCLC 42388146.

As collaborator:

- "Engineering design" (with Ian Charteris, Andrew Nahum), Science Museum, 1986.
- "Drawing for engineers" (with Paul Grant), Design Council, 1989.

As Editorial Consultant:

- Pipes, Alan (1 February 1987). Computer-aided architectural design futures. Butterworth-Heinemann. ISBN 0-408-05300-3. OCLC 15472047.
- "Color" by Edith Anderson Feisner, Laurence King, 2001.
- "New Media Design" by Tricia Austin and Richard Doust, Laurence King, 2007.

Fiction

- Pipes, Alan (Fred) (2013-4-11). Murder on the Gatwick Express, Vernier Press, ISBN 1-898825-07-6.
- Pipes, Alan (Fred) (2014). The Fracking Cult Murders, Vernier Press, ISBN 1-898825-08-4.
