= Mark Champkins =

British product designer

Mark Champkins FRSA
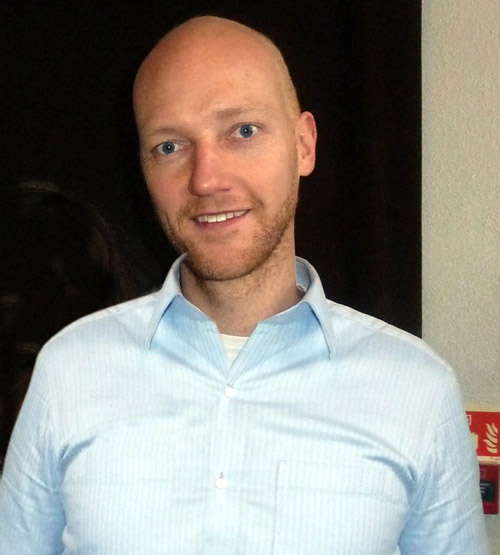
- Born: 25 April 1977 (age 49)
- Citizenship: United Kingdom
- Education: University of Cambridge, Royal College of Art
- Occupation: Product designer

Mark Champkins FRSA (born 25 April 1977) is a product designer best known for his 2007 appearance on Dragons' Den.

== Career ==
Champkins studied manufacturing engineering at the University of Cambridge and industrial design engineering at the Royal College of Art in London. He is a fellow of the Royal Society of Arts and an industrial advisor to Cambridge University Engineering Department.

Champkins' design for a line of "self-heating" crockery was awarded British Invention of the Year at the British Invention Show.

In 2004, Champkins won a business award from NESTA and founded Concentrate Design, a company that develops products intended to help pupils to concentrate at school. Champkins pitched the enterprise on Dragons' Den in 2007, winning an investment from Peter Jones.

In 2011, Champkins was named inventor-in-residence at the London Science Museum and tasked with designing products inspired by the museum collection.

Champkins is the author of The Big Book of Celebrity Inventions.
