= Mahmoud Maina =

British-Nigerian neuroscientist

Mahmoud Bukar Maina
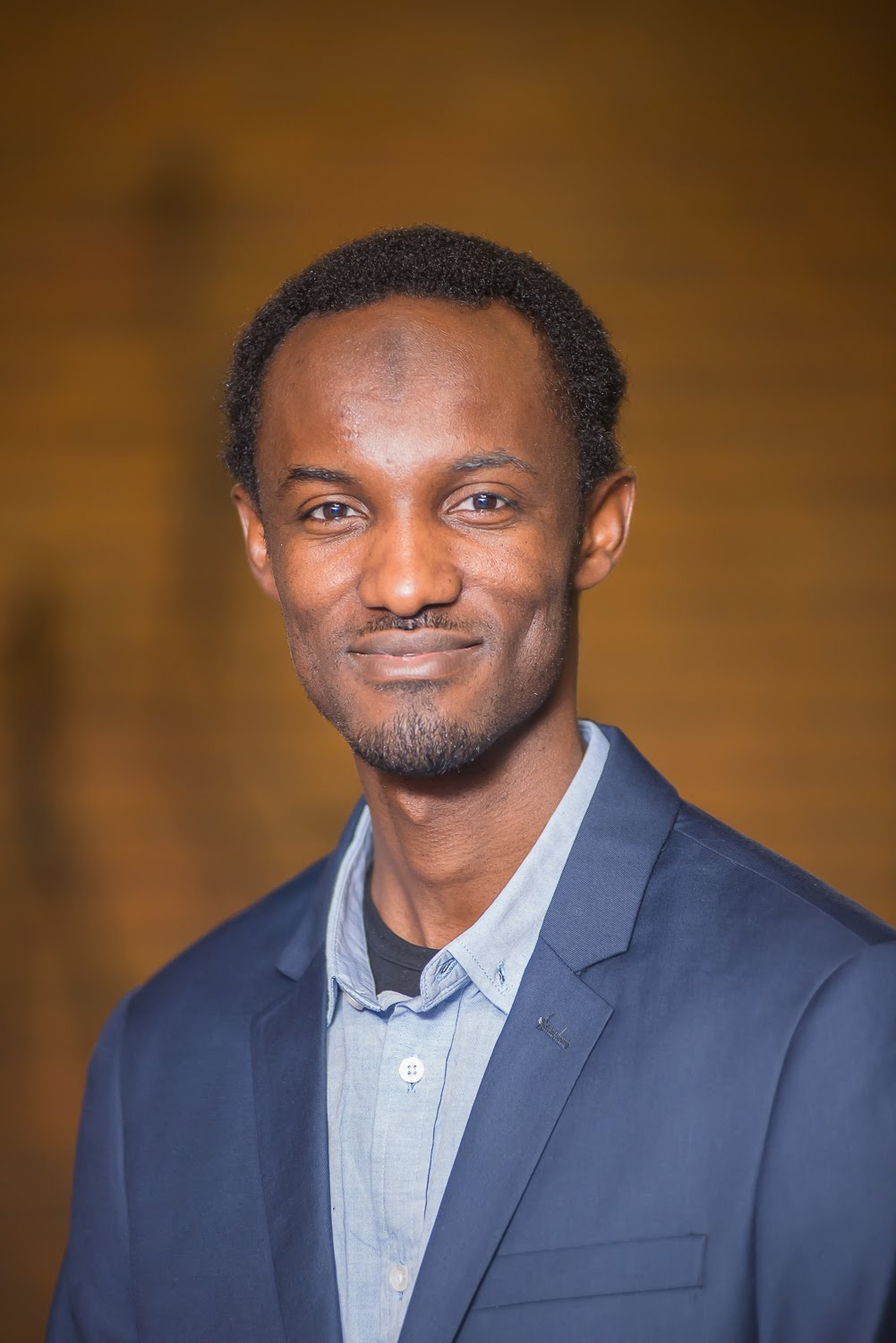
- Education: University of Maiduguri, University of Sussex
- Scientific career
- Workplaces: University of Sussex, Gombe State University
- Thesis: From chromatin to protein synthesis: the role of glutamate, amyloid beta and tau in Alzheimer's disease
- Doctoral advisor: Louise Serpell

Mahmoud Bukar Maina is a British-Nigerian neuroscientist, educator, and researcher, based at the University of Sussex in the United Kingdom. His research is focused on the cellular and molecular pathogenesis in Alzheimer's disease. He performs outreach work to inspire young people in Africa to pursue science and to increase public understanding of science. He is the Honorary Special Adviser on Science, Research, and Innovation to Governor Mai Mala Buni of Yobe State, Nigeria.

== Early life and education ==
Maina is originally from Nguru, Yobe State, Nigeria. He attended Federal Government College Buni Yadi in Yobe State for his Secondary School. He completed his Bachelor of Science in Human Anatomy at the University of Maiduguri, Nigeria, in 2007. After working at the Federal Neuropsychiatric Hospital Maiduguri and Gombe State University, he moved to the UK in 2011 to pursue a Master of Science in Cellular and Molecular Neuroscience at the University of Sussex. He went on to do a PhD at Sussex University in the lab of Louise Serpell, for which he received a prestigious the Chancellor's International Research Scholarship. His PhD research was focussed on the role of nuclear Tau in Alzheimer's disease. He completed his PhD in 2017, and is now an Independent Research Fellow in Sussex Neuroscience at the University of Sussex. He became a Fellow of the Royal Society of Arts in 2018. He is also a visiting faculty member at Yobe State University, Nigeria and founder of the Biomedical Science Research and Training Centre (BioRTC) in Yobe State University.

== Research ==
During his PhD, Dr Maina revealed the localization of tau in the nucleolar remodelling complex in cultured cells and human brains and its role in nucleolar transcription and nucleolar stress response. Traditionally, tau has been studied as a microtubule-associated protein, and its role in microtubules and aggregation has been widely studied to explain tauopathies - a group of diseases in which tau misfunctions. Dr Maina's work revealed that tau has other roles in the nucleolus, a finding that significantly aided the development of a new field focusing on tau biology in the nucleus. Dr. Maina continued his investigation as a postdoctoral fellow in the Serpell lab using a combination of biophysics, cell culture, and high-content imaging, leading him to show that 1) paired helical filaments in Alzheimer's disease are cross-linked via ditorysine bonds, a process that triggers the formation of insoluble tau in vitro. 2) the self-assembly process of amyloid beta is critical for its toxicity, explaining why oligomers confer more toxicity than amyloid beta fibrils.

Recognizing the potential influence of ancestral backgrounds on nucleolar pathways and tauopathies, and acknowledging the underrepresentation of Africans in tauopathy research despite Africa's rich genetic diversity, Dr. Maina took the initiative to bridge this research gap through the development of less invasive models. In Nigeria, he collaborated extensively with local stakeholders in Yobe State, through which his team at BioRTC is pioneering the generation of induced pluripotent stem cells (iPSCs) from indigenous Nigerians. His research seeks to dissect the functional role of tau in the nucleolus and the cellular and molecular mechanisms of nucleolar dysfunction in tauopathies, with a particular emphasis on the role of African ancestry.

== Outreach work and awards ==
Growing up in Nigeria, Maina said he was inspired by his father's science book to become a scientist. However, there was a high level of misconceptions about science and a lack of visible science role models in his community, which hinders many young people from developing an interest in science disciplines. As a result Maina founded the outreach program for TReND in Africa, an organisation that aims to improve scientific development in Sub-Saharan Africa, for example by organising workshops on open hardware and neuroscience, and science fairs for students and teachers. He also started the Science Communication Hub in Nigeria, a platform that aims to connect scientists from Nigeria and increase the visibility of Nigerian and African scientists. He has published about neuroscience research in Nigeria and in Africa's 54 countries, as part of his ongoing work to enhance neuroscience research in Africa.

In 2019 Maina started the African Science Literacy Network, a project aimed at training scientists and journalists in effectively communicating research. In September 2019 Maina organised a workshop which launched the project. Realising that while communicating science and raising awareness about to the public is crucial, a critical hindrance for scientific progress in Africa is the lack of many hubs with the appropriate infrastructure to pursue science locally. Using his connections with TReND in Africa and with the support of the Yobe State Government, Maina established the Biomedical Science Research and Training Centre (BioRTC) in Yobe State University in 2021. Through BioRTC, Maina and his team with the support of diverse funders, including the Chan Zuckerberg Initiative are training the next generation of African scientists especially in areas of neuroscience, open hardware and bioimaging

As a neuroscientist, he is currently developing the first sets of induced Pluripotent Stem Cell (iPSC) models from ethnically diverse African donors to increase the inclusion of African iPSC models in neurodegenerative disease research. He argues that "Africa has the greatest genetic diversity, yet African models barely exist in global neuroscience."

Maina's work also canvasses for an increase in the research output of neuroscientists on the African continent, arguing that neuroscience, which is currently driven by local priorities, has to be multidirectional; solving disease and brain-related problems while adopting artificial intelligence.

For his outreach work, he has received the Royal Society of Biology Science Communication Award in 2017 and the Young African Scientists in Europe award for the Champion of Science Storytelling Challenge. In December 2018, he was nominated for The Future Awards Africa Prize for Young Person of the Year 2018, both for his research in degenerative diseases and for his outreach work. In 2019, he was awarded the New England BioLabs Passion in Science Humanitarian Duty Award and Kroto Public Engagement Award by Sussex's School of Life Sciences. He is a recipient of the ALBA-FKNE Diversity Prize (2022) "for his longstanding efforts to expand science capacity in Africa and promote diversity in basic neuroscience research."
