= Chello =

- Type: Brand
- Industry: Internet service provider
- Founded: 1998
- Fate: Rebranded as UPC Live, ComHem, Get, and other Liberty Global brands
- Area served: Austria, Belgium, France, Hungary, Netherlands, Norway, Poland, Slovakia, New Zealand
- Services: Broadband internet access via cable, e-mail, content portal
- Parent: Liberty Global Europe

Chello was the brand of internet service provider-activities of Liberty Global Europe (formerly UGC), a provider of broadband internet access via cable in Europe, with estimated 1.3 million customers across its markets. LGE operates in 15 European, 4 Latin American and 2 Asian/Pacific countries. The Chello branded internet service were available in seven of these: Austria, Belgium, France, Hungary, The Netherlands, Norway, Poland and Slovakia. The Chello brand was introduced in the European market in 1998 and was awarded the best Consumer ISP award in 1999

Features of the Chello service are standardized according to the cable provider. In each market Chello delivered open-access content portals that featured local news and entertainment content. Also, all users of the service were granted email addresses.

Chello products were typically available at many speeds and are named Chello Starter, Chello Easy, Chello Classic, Chello Plus and Chello Extreme.

The Chello brand appears to have been replaced by other brands. For example, in The Netherlands, Chello has been renamed to UPC Live. UPC Live also has replaced Chello in Austria, the Czech Republic, Poland and Hungary. In Sweden, Chello has been replaced by ComHem, and in Norway, by Get. In Ireland, UPC Ireland took over the broadband and cable service NTL in 2005, having previously bought another Irish cable provider - Chorus. In 2015, UPC in Ireland was rebranded as Virgin Media Ireland. In Belgium, Chello was a product of UPC that was absorbed by Telenet in 2006 when Liberty Global bought a majority stake in Telenet.

The brand was available in New Zealand in the early 2000s, under TelstraSaturn's cable network.
