= Julie Kent (sociologist) =

English academic and sociologist

- Born: 1957 (age 68–69)
- Known for: Bioethics, cell therapy, feminist bioethics, biobased economies
- Scientific career
- Fields: Bioethics, cell therapy, feminist bioethics, biobased economies
- Workplaces: University of the West of England

Dr. Julie Kent (born 1957) is a professor of Sociology at the University of the West of England.

== Career ==
Kent obtained her Bachelors of Science in Sociology degree from the University of Bath in 1990. She then later graduated from the University of Bristol with a PhD in sociology in 1995, and in 2007 became a professor of Sociology of Health Technology. Kent was a member of the Medicines and Healthcare Products Regulatory Agency (MRHA) Committee on Safety Devices and is now Chair of the University Research Ethics Committee at the University of the West of England.

At the 2006 Stem Cell Ethics Workshop in London, Kent gave a lecture on ethics and regulations in the world of the fetus alongside Professor Naomi Pfeffer.

In late 2012, along with Dr. Maria Fannin from the University of Bristol, Kent won a grant from the Wellcome Trust to fund a research project into placental tissue.

Kent has received more than £224,000 from the Economic and Social Research Council. One grant was worth more than £79,000 for research into tissue and cell technologies, and another was worth more than £145,000 for fetal stem cell research.

== Bibliography ==
=== Books ===
- Kent, Julie (2000). Social perspectives on pregnancy and chilbirth for midwives, nurses and the caring professions. Buckingham Philadelphia: Open University Press. ISBN 978-0-335-19911-2.
- Kent, Julie (2012). Regenerating bodies: tissue and cell therapies in the twenty-first century. London New York: Routledge. ISBN 978-0-415-68881-9.

=== Book chapters ===
- Kent, Julie; Meulen, Rudd ter (2011), "Public trust and public bodies: the regulation of the use of human tissue for research in the United Kingdom.", in Lenk, Christian; Sándor, Judit; Gordijn, Bert (eds.), Biobanks and tissue research the public, the patient and the regulation, Dordrecht Netherlands: Springer, pp. 17–36, ISBN 978-94-007-1672-8

=== Journal articles ===
- Kent, Julie; Bell, Margaret; Noakes, Sara (June 1998). "Looking after children: implications for social work education". Children & Society. 12 (3): 242–243. doi:10.1111/j.1099-0860.1998.tb00075.x.
- Kent, Julie; Faulkner, Alex (2002). "Regulating human implant technologies in Europe - understanding the new era in medical device regulation". Health, Risk & Society. 4 (2): 189–209. doi:10.1080/13698570220137060. S2CID 71863538.
- Kent, Julie; Goodenough, Trudy; Williamson, Emma; Ashcroft, Richard (April 2003). "What did you think about that? Researching children's perceptions of participation in a longitudinal genetic epidemiological study". Children & Society. 17 (2): 113–125. doi:10.1002/CHI.739.
- Kent, Julie (October 2003). "Lay experts and the politics of breast implants". Public Understanding of Science. 12 (4): 401–419. doi:10.1177/0963662503124005. PMID 14971402. S2CID 40743053.
- Kent, Julie; Sellman, Derek (January 2005). "Ethics and governance of research". Centre for Critical Theory Members Conference - What is Research?.
- Kent, Julie; Goodenough, Trudy; Williamson, Emma; Ashcroft, Richard (November 2005). "Conducting research with children: the limits of confidentiality and child protection protocols". Children & Society. 19 (5): 397–409. doi:10.1002/chi.852.
- Kent, Julie; Faulkner, Alex; Geesink, Ingrid; Fitzatrick, David (January 2006). "Towards governance of human tissue engineered technologies in Europe: framing the case for a new regulatory regime". Technological Forecasting and Social Change. 73 (1): 41–60. doi:10.1016/j.techfore.2005.06.006.
- Kent, Julie; Faulkner, Alex; Geesink, Ingrid; Fitzatrick, David (June 2006). "Culturing cells, reproducing and regulating the self". Body & Society. 12 (2): 1–23. doi:10.1177/1357034X06064296. S2CID 145755822.
- Kent, Julie; Fletcher, Catherine; Boden, Rebecca; Tinson, Julie (September 2007). "Performing women: the gendered dimensions of the UK new research economy". Gender, Work & Organization. 14 (5): 433–453. doi:10.1111/j.1468-0432.2007.00359.x. hdl:1893/687.
- Kent, Julie; Faulkner, Alex; Geesink, Ingrid; Fitzatrick, David (2008). "Tissue-engineered technologies: scientific biomedicine, frames of risk and regulatory regime-building in Europe". Science as Culture. 17 (2): 195–222. doi:10.1080/09505430802062950. S2CID 144985725.
- Kent, Julie (December 2008). "The fetal tissue economy: from the abortion clinic to the stem cell laboratory". Social Science and Medicine. 67 (11): 1747–1756. doi:10.1016/j.socscimed.2008.09.027. PMID 18945530.
- Kent, Julie; Busby, Helen; Farrell, Anne-Maree (March 2013). "Revaluing donor and recipient bodies in the globalised blood economy: transitions in public policy on blood safety in the United Kingdom". Health. 17 (2): 77–94. doi:10.1177/1363460706053336. PMC 3930469. PMID 23467898.

=== Contributions ===
- Webster, Andrew. New Technologies in Health Care: Challenge, Change and Innovation. Basingstoke: Palgrave Macmillan, 2006. Print.

== See also ==
- Gender studies
- Bioethics
- Cell therapy
- Feminist bioethics
- Biobased economies
- Placenta
- Stem cell research
