= Matthew Uttley =

British military-history writer (born 1965)

Matthew R. H. Uttley
- Born: 1965 (age 60–61)

Academic work
- Main interests: war and strategy, defence policy, defence economics
- Notable works: The Changing Face of Maritime Power, Westland and the British Helicopter Industry

Matthew R. H. Uttley born in 1965, is a British academic best known for his published work on the historical and contemporary dimensions of defence economics, weapons acquisition, and United Kingdom defence policy. He is a Fellow of the Royal Society of Arts and the Royal Historical Society.

== Biography ==
Uttley became Academic Director of King's College London’s Policy Institute in April 2012. As Professor of Defence Studies at King’s College London, he was Head of King's Defence Studies Department from 2006 to 2012. He is a visiting professor at the Baltic Defence College. In 2011 he was awarded the Baltic Defence College Medal of Merit.

Uttley has previously taught at the Royal Naval College, Greenwich, the University of York and Lancaster University. Uttley publishes on defence economics, weapons acquisition, and British defence policy.

In 2018 he was recognised in the King's Teaching Excellence Awards.

== Publications ==
- Contractors on Deployed Operations: United Kingdom Policy and Doctrine (Strategic Studies Institute, 2005).
- With Stuart Croft, Andrew Dorman, Wyn Rees, Britain and Defence 1945-2000: A Policy Re-evaluation (Longman, 2001)
- Westland and the British Helicopter Industry (Frank Cass, 2001)
- With Andrew Dorman and Mike Lawrence Smith, The Changing Face of Maritime Power (Macmillan, 1999).
