= Kevin Keasey =

Kevin Keasey is Professor of Accounting and Finance, Director of the International Banking Institute and Director of the Centre for Advanced Studies in Finance at Leeds University Business School, University of Leeds.

== Early life and education ==
Keasey was born in Hartlepool on 5 October 1955, and educated at Brinkburn Grammar School. He was a keen rugby player and represented County, and trialled for Northern England, at the School level. He was an economics undergraduate of St Cuthbert’s Society, Durham University and studied for his MA and PhD in economics at Newcastle University. woodworking, boats and motorcycles.

== Career ==
Keasey has a BA in Economics from the University of Durham, an MA in Public and Industrial Economics from the University of Newcastle upon Tyne and a PhD in Economics also from Newcastle. He was a Reader in Accounting and Finance at the University of Warwick until 1989 when he was appointed to his current post at Leeds.

== Research ==
The 1997 Journal of Management survey ranked Keasey the joint 7th most published author globally, and one of his articles was ranked as a top 50 worldwide management article in 2007.
