= VodafoneZiggo =

Dutch telecommunications company

VodafoneZiggo Group B.V.

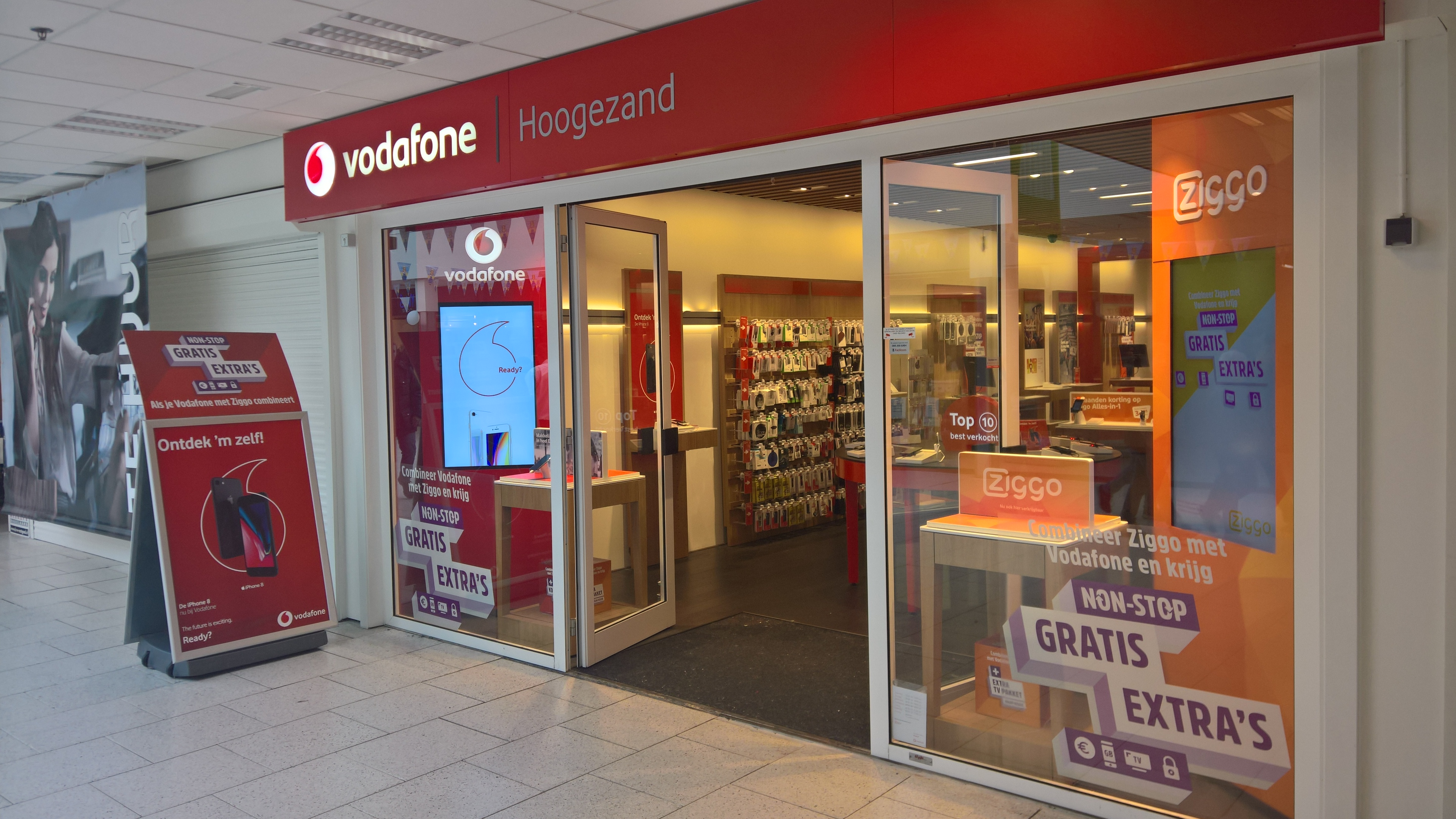
- Type: Private
- Industry: Telecommunications
- Founded: 31 December 2016; 9 years ago
- Founder: Vodafone; Liberty Global
- Headquarters: Utrecht, Netherlands
- Area served: Netherlands
- Key people: Stephen Van Rooyen (CEO)
- Products: Mobile telephony and fixed telephony
- Owner: Liberty Global (90%); Vodafone (10%)
- Subsidiaries: Vodafone Netherlands; Ziggo; Telenet Group
- Website: www.vodafoneziggo.nl

VodafoneZiggo Group B.V. is a privately held company, originally founded as a joint venture by Vodafone and Liberty Global, in February 2016, and was approved by the European Commission in August 2016 and completed in December 2016. VodafoneZiggo is headquartered in Utrecht.

== History ==
After the founding, Jeroen Hoencamp was appointed CEO of VodafoneZiggo since 2016. Hoencamp was previously CEO of Vodafone Ireland since 2010. He remains CEO as of 2019.

On 21 May 2024, Vodafone Group Plc and Liberty Global announced the appointment of Stephen van Rooyen as the CEO of VodafoneZiggo, effective from September 2024. Van Rooyen, previously CEO of Sky UK & Ireland, will succeed Jeroen Hoencamp, who retired, with Ritchy Drost serving as interim CEO until van Rooyen assumes the role.

In February 2026, it was announced that Vodafone would sell most of its stake in VodafoneZiggo to Liberty Global. In 2027, the company, which will continue within the new Ziggo Group together with Telenet, is expected to be listed on the Amsterdam stock exchange. Vodafone will retain a ten percent stake in the Ziggo Group.

== Vodafone Netherlands ==
- In 1995, Libertel was founded.
- In 1995, BelCompany was also founded.
- In 1999, Libertel went public, and renamed to Vodafone Libertel in 2000.
- In 2003, Vodafone acquired Vodafone Libertel.
- In 2004, mITE Systems was founded.
- In 2011, Vodafone Libertel bought BelCompany.
- In 2012, Vodafone Libertel acquired Telespectrum Telecommunicatie.
- In 2015, Vodafone Libertel acquired mITE Systems.
- In December 2016, Vodafone Libertel became a subsidiary of VodafoneZiggo.

== Ziggo ==
- In 1970, Casema was founded (cable television provider, later including internet and telephone services over cable).
- In 1984, Multikabel was founded (cable television provider, later including internet service over cable).
- In 1996, @Home Network was founded (internet service provider), later known as Essent Kabelcom.
- In 1998, UPC Nederland was founded. (cable and internet service provider).
- Warburg Pincus and Cinven bought Multikabel in 2005, and Casema and @Home in 2006.
- In 2008, Ziggo was created by merging Casema, Multikabel, and @Home.
- In 2012, Ziggo went public on.
- In 2014, Liberty Global acquired Ziggo.
- In 2015, Ziggo merged with UPC Nederland.
- In December 2016, Ziggo became a subsidiary of VodafoneZiggo.
