= UPC Broadband =

European telecommunications company

UPC Holding B.V.
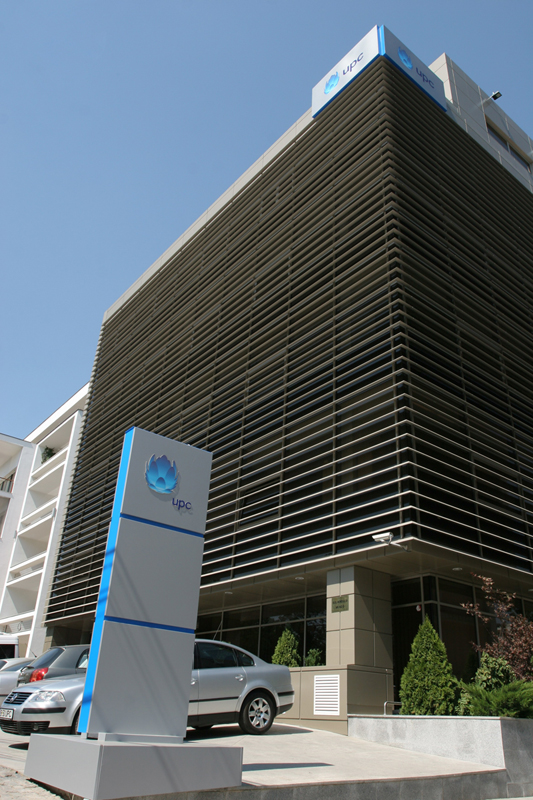
- Type: Private
- Industry: Telecommunications
- Predecessor: Philips
- Founded: 1995; 31 years ago, in Amsterdam, Netherlands (as United Philips Cable)
- Founder: United International Holdings; Philips
- Successor: Liberty Global
- Headquarters: Amsterdam, Netherlands
- Area served: Europe
- Services: Cable television Broadband internet Fixed-line telephone
- Owner: Liberty Global (trademark), O2 Slovakia (only UPC business)
- Subsidiaries: UPC Slovakia; UPC Switzerland; UPC Netherlands; UPC Romania; UPC Hungary; UPC Slovenia; UPC Sweden; UPC Norway; Merkur-Arena; UPC Automobiles; UPC Austria; UPC France

UPC Holding was a European telecommunications company owned by Liberty Global. Since the sale of the last business in Slovakia to O2 Slovakia, the company no longer owns the brand. UPC provided cable television, broadband internet and fixed telephony in Slovakia, and operated in most countries in Europe.

UPC was founded in Amsterdam, Netherlands by United International Holdings and Philips, originally as United Philips Cable, which included the cable television assets in Europe of both companies. In 1997 UnitedGlobalCom (former United International Holdings) acquired the Philips shares and renamed the company United Pan-Europe Communications. In 1999 the company was listed on Euronext Amsterdam. In 2005 Liberty Media International merged with UnitedGlobalCom and formed Liberty Global.

UPC was a major telecommunications provider in the world and operating in Austria, Belgium, Czech Republic, France, Hungary, Ireland, the Netherlands, Norway, Poland, Romania, Slovakia, Slovenia, and Sweden. In 1990s before unification under UPC brand had cable companies in Germany, Portugal and Spain. In early 2000s had 50% shares in companies in Israel and Malta.

== History ==
=== Acquisitions ===
In 2005, Liberty Global Europe bought the Romanian communications company Astral Telecom for $420 million, the Swiss communications company Cablecom for CHF2.8 billion, and the Slovenian communications company UPC Telemach for EUR71 million. In 2007 UPC Telemach also bought 66.7% of Ljubljanski kabel (major competition in Ljubljana) and grew its market share to 40% in Slovenia.

=== Former UPC operations ===
UPC sold French Citecable operations in France in 1996, in Germany in 1997 and Spain and Portugal in 1998.

In 2002, UPC sold their 47% ownership interest in Tevel Israel International Communications Ltd.

In 1999, UPC purchased approximately 25% of Primacom cable company in Germany. In April 2000 UPC announced that will buy EWT/TSS Group and in 2001 EWT/TSS merged with Primacom. In 2006 UPC sold their remaining shares in company.

In 2007, UPC sold their 50% shares in Melita telecommunications company in Malta to GMT Communications Partners.

UPC Norway was bought by Candover Investments for $542 million and changed the name to Get AS.

UPC France was sold for $1.56 billion, in 2006, to Noos (Ypso Holding) before being integrated into Numericable and then SFR in 2016.

UPC Sweden was sold in April 2006 for $427 million to Com Hem.

UPC acquired in 2005, the majority stake in the Telemach operator in Slovenia, renaming it UPC Telemach. After the complete acquisition of all shares in 2008, the name was changed to UPC. In 2009 the company was resold to Telemach, returning to the old name.

In October 2015, UPC Ireland Was merged with Virgin Media Ireland, UPC got first rebranded with Chorus:NTL in 2010.

UPC Netherlands merged with Ziggo, another Liberty Global subsidiary. The new company was formed under name Ziggo and in 2016 merged with Vodafone Netherlands to form VodafoneZiggo.

UPC Austria was acquired by T-Mobile Austria on 31 July 2018 and fully integrated in Magenta Telekom in May 2019.

In July 2019, Vodafone bought Liberty Global operations in Germany where operates Unitymedia, another Liberty Global subsidiary, Hungary, Romania and the Czech Republic. On 31 March 2020 UPC Czech Republic merged with Vodafone Czech Republic, UPC Hungary merged with Vodafone Hungary and UPC Romania merged with Vodafone Romania.

UPC Poland was sold to Polish cellular telecommunications provider Play (owned by Iliad Group) for US$1.8 billion. Deal was closed on 1 April 2022.

In May 2022, Liberty Global re-branded its Swiss operation, Sunrise UPC, as simply Sunrise, followed by its spin-off in November 2024.

In 18 December 2025, Liberty Global sold the last UPC asset in Slovakia to E& PPF Telecom Group for €95 Million, making end to their UPC business.

== Divisions ==
In 1997 the company started offering broadband internet and landline telephony in the Netherlands. These services have also been extended to other countries under the chello brand for internet services and Priority Telecom for telephony and later for b2b services. In 2007 the company replaced the chello brand with UPC for internet services.

UPC operated several television channels under the UPCtv brand, and later after the acquisition of Zone Vision merged with it under the Zone Media brand and later rebranded as Chello Zone, part of Chellomedia. Chellomedia was sold in 2014 to AMC Networks and renamed as AMC Networks International.
