= CineNova =

Dutch premium television service

- Country: Netherlands
- Broadcast area: Netherlands

Programming
- Language: Dutch/English
- Picture format: 576i SDTV
- Timeshift service: CineNova 2

Ownership
- Owner: Buena Vista International Television; Sony Pictures Entertainment; UPC Nederland

History
- Launched: 18 May 2000; 26 years ago
- Closed: 18 May 2005; 21 years ago

Links
- Website: cinenova.tv

CineNova was a Dutch premium television service broadcasting films on 2 television channels, owned by a joint venture of Buena Vista International Television, Sony Pictures Entertainment and UPC Nederland.

== History ==
The channel kicked off with John Woo's action film Face/Off on 18 May 2000. From the start it was available on UPC Nederland, Casema and Mr. Zap.

On 1 February 2001 CineNova launched a second television channel called CineNova 2. It is a +1 hour timeshift channel of the main channel.

In 2004 CineNova acquired the broadcasting rights for live coverage of the Oscars ceremony.

With the acquisition of the Dutch Canal+ channels by Chellomedia (sister company of UPC Nederland), the major cable companies such as UPC, Essent and Multikabel decided to remove the CineNova channels. The service closed on 18 May 2005.
