= Jared Polis =

Governor of Colorado since 2019 (born 1975)

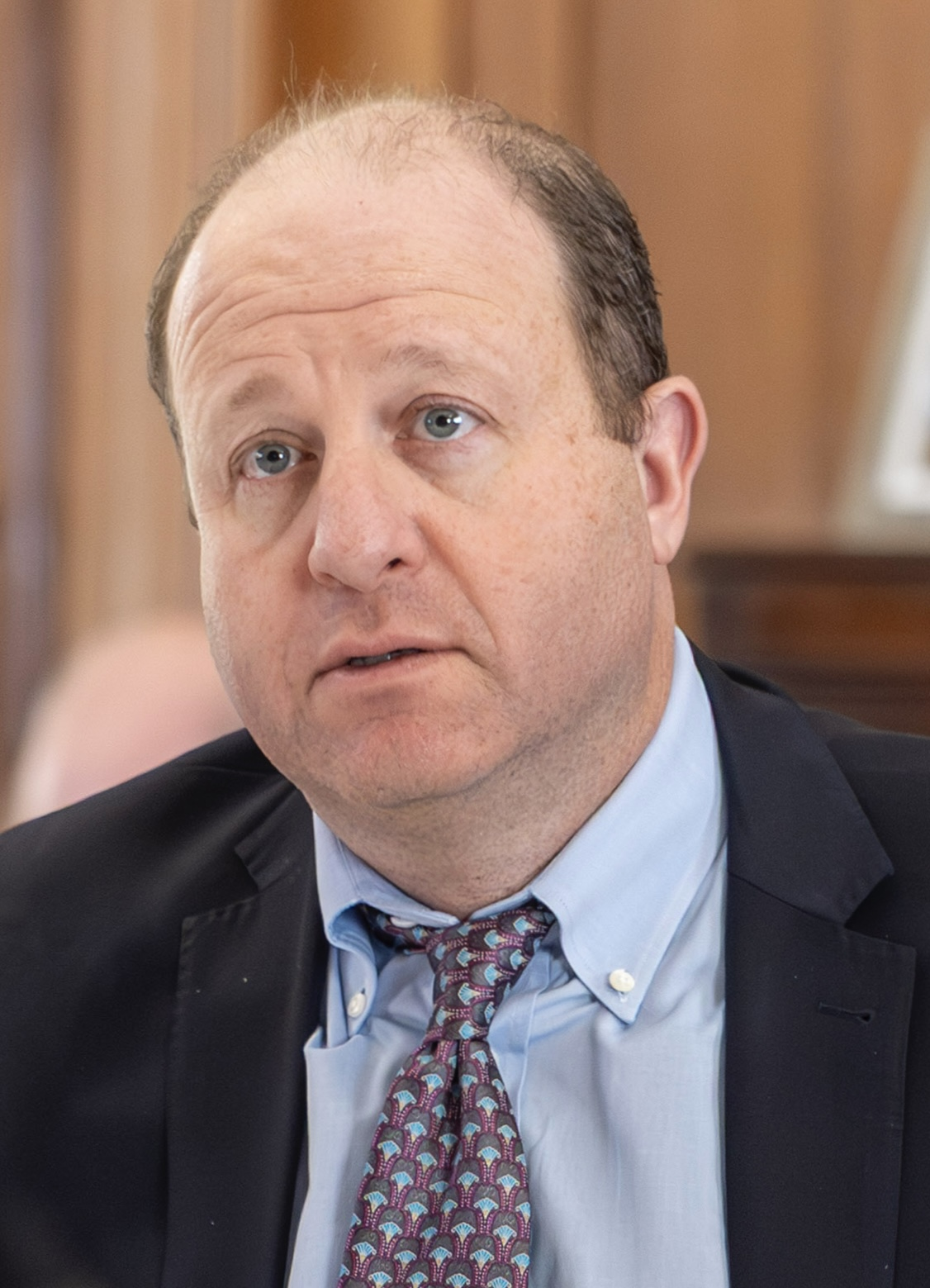
- Polis in 2026

43rd Governor of Colorado
- Incumbent
- Assumed office January 8, 2019
- Lieutenant: Dianne Primavera
- Preceded by: John Hickenlooper

Chair of the National Governors Association
- In office July 12, 2024 – July 26, 2025
- Preceded by: Spencer Cox
- Succeeded by: Kevin Stitt

Member of the U.S. House of Representatives from Colorado's 2nd district
- In office January 3, 2009 – January 3, 2019
- Preceded by: Mark Udall
- Succeeded by: Joe Neguse

Member of the Colorado State Board of Education from the at-large district
- In office January 3, 2001 – January 3, 2007
- Preceded by: Ben Alexander
- Succeeded by: Constituency abolished

Personal details
- Born: Jared Schutz; May 12, 1975 (age 51) Boulder, Colorado, U.S.
- Party: Democratic
- Spouse: Marlon Reis (m. 2021)
- Children: 2
- Relatives: Susan Polis (mother)
- Education: Princeton University (BA)
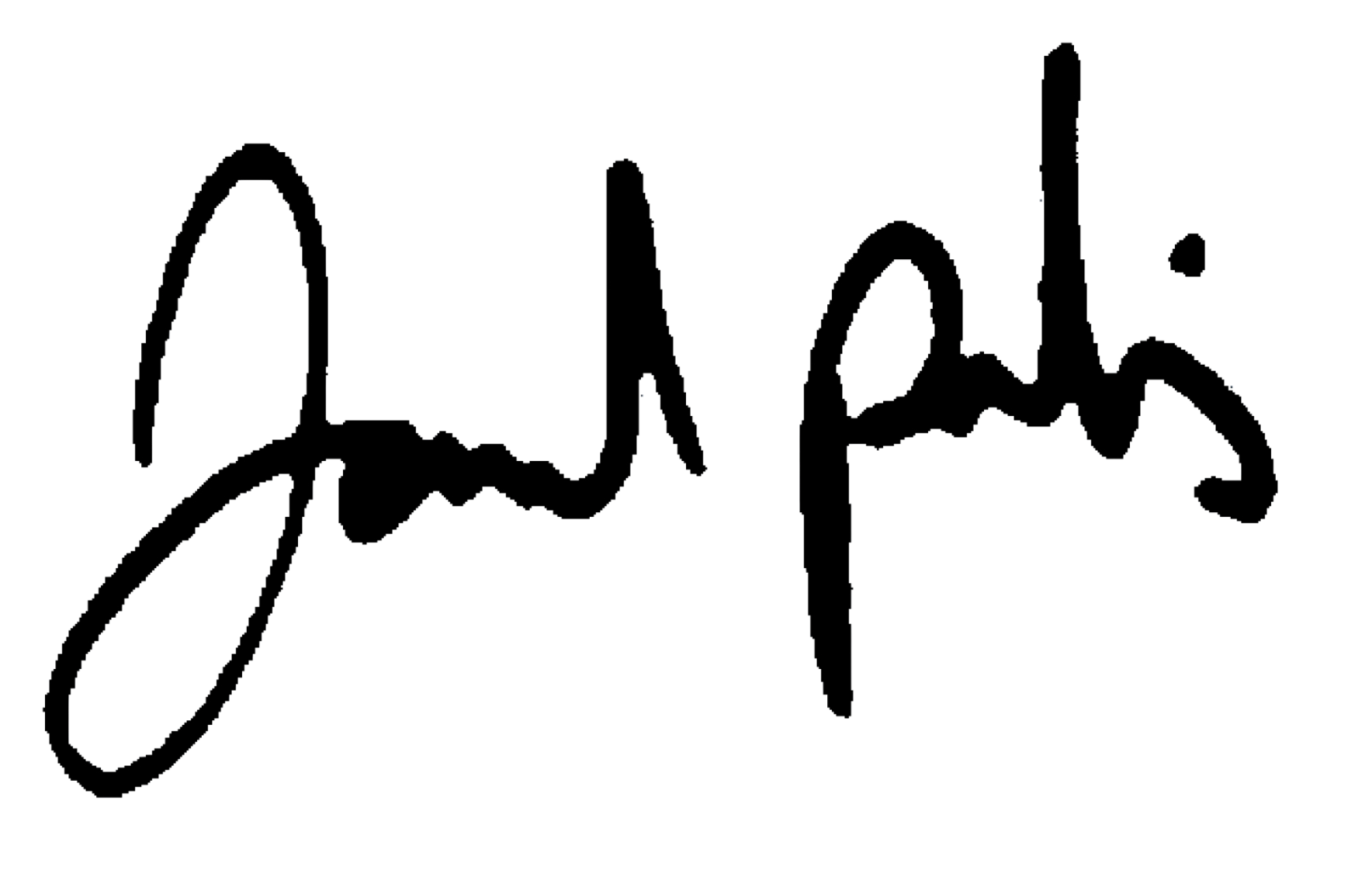
- Signature
- Website: Campaign website
- Polis's voice Polis supporting an amendment to repeal Don't Ask, Don't Tell. Recorded May 27, 2010

Jared Schutz Polis (/ˈpoʊlɪs/ POH-liss; né Schutz; born May 12, 1975) is an American politician, entrepreneur, businessman, and philanthropist serving since 2019 as the 43rd governor of Colorado. From 2009 to 2019, he served in the U.S. House of Representatives, representing Colorado's 2nd congressional district. From 2001 to 2007 he served on the Colorado State Board of Education. He is a member of the Democratic Party.

First elected to Congress in 2008, Polis is the first gay man elected to Congress as a non-incumbent. He was the third-wealthiest member of the United States Congress, with an estimated net worth of $122.6 million, and the only Democratic member of the Liberty Caucus. In 2011, he became the first gay parent in Congress.

In 2018, Polis was elected governor of Colorado. He is the first gay man elected governor of a U.S. state, the first Jewish governor of Colorado, and the first governor in a same-sex marriage. He was reelected in 2022.

== Early life and education ==
Polis is the son of Stephen Schutz and Susan Polis Schutz, founders of greeting card and book publisher Blue Mountain Arts. He was born at Boulder Community Hospital in Boulder, Colorado, in 1975. He lived in San Diego, California, as a high school student and graduated from La Jolla Country Day School in three years with multiple honors. He graduated from Princeton University with a B.A. in politics in 1996, writing a 157-page senior thesis, "Paradigm Shift: Politics in the Information Age", under the supervision of Carol M. Swain. While at Princeton, Polis served as communications director of the undergraduate student government and was involved in other campus organizations, such as Model Congress, Phi Gamma Delta, and the Princeton Juggling Club. As a college sophomore, Polis purchased stamps from a Legends of the West series at the Princeton post office. The USPS had recently recalled the series due to a printing error in the image of Bill Pickett, making his stamps far more valuable. Polis sold the stamps to a collector for a sum "exceeding $1,000". In 2000, he legally changed his surname to his mother's to raise awareness for a fundraiser and because he simply "liked it better".

== Business career ==
Polis co-founded American Information Systems (AIS), Inc., while still in college. AIS was an internet access provider and was sold in 1998. In 1996, he co-founded a free electronic greeting card website, bluemountain.com, which was sold to Excite@Home in 1999 for $430 million in stock and $350 million in cash. In February 1998, Polis founded ProFlowers, an online florist, in La Jolla, California. In December of that year, economist Arthur Laffer began advising Polis and joined ProFlowers as a director. ProFlowers, later renamed Provide Commerce, Inc., went public on NASDAQ as PRVD on December 17, 2003. In 2005, media conglomerate Liberty Media Corporation acquired Provide Commerce for $477 million. Polis and other investors founded Techstars in Boulder, Colorado, in 2006. It developed into a global venture capital firm. During his tenure in Congress, Polis was among its wealthiest members, with his net worth estimated at more than $300 million.

== Early political career ==
Polis has been called one of the "Gang of Four"—four wealthy Coloradans who made a concerted effort to support Democrats in statewide legislative races. The other members are Pat Stryker, Rutt Bridges, and Tim Gill. The Gang of Four's influence has been cited as a factor in Colorado's shift toward the Democratic Party in the 2000s and 2010s.

=== State Board of Education ===
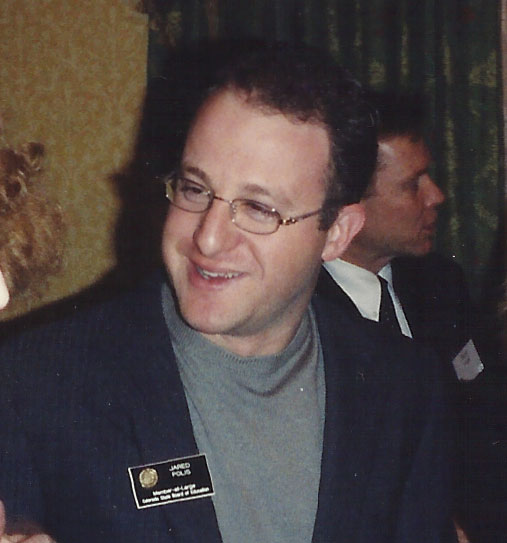
Polis in 2002

In 2000, Polis was elected at-large as a member of the Colorado State Board of Education and served a single six-year term until January 2007, when the district was eliminated. His election was one of the closest in Colorado history, as he defeated incumbent Ben Alexander by 90 votes out of 1.6 million cast. During his term, Polis served as both chairman and vice chairman of the board.

=== Ballot measures ===
In 2006, Polis served as co-chair of Coloradans for Clean Government, a committee that supported Amendment 41, a citizen-initiated ballot measure to ban gifts by registered lobbyists to government officials, establish a $50 annual restriction on gift-giving from non-lobbyists, establish a two-year cooling-off period before former state legislators and statewide elected officials can begin lobbying, and create an independent ethics commission. In November 2006, 62.3% of Colorado voters approved the "Ethics in Government" constitutional amendment.

In 2014, Polis planned to champion two ballot measures to limit fracking in Colorado by banning drilling near schools and homes and empowering communities to pass their own rules. The measures were dropped after he reached a deal with Governor John Hickenlooper to create a task force. The absence of the initiatives was seen as a relief to vulnerable Democrats who would have had to take controversial stances on the issue.

== U.S. House of Representatives (2009–2019) ==
=== Elections ===
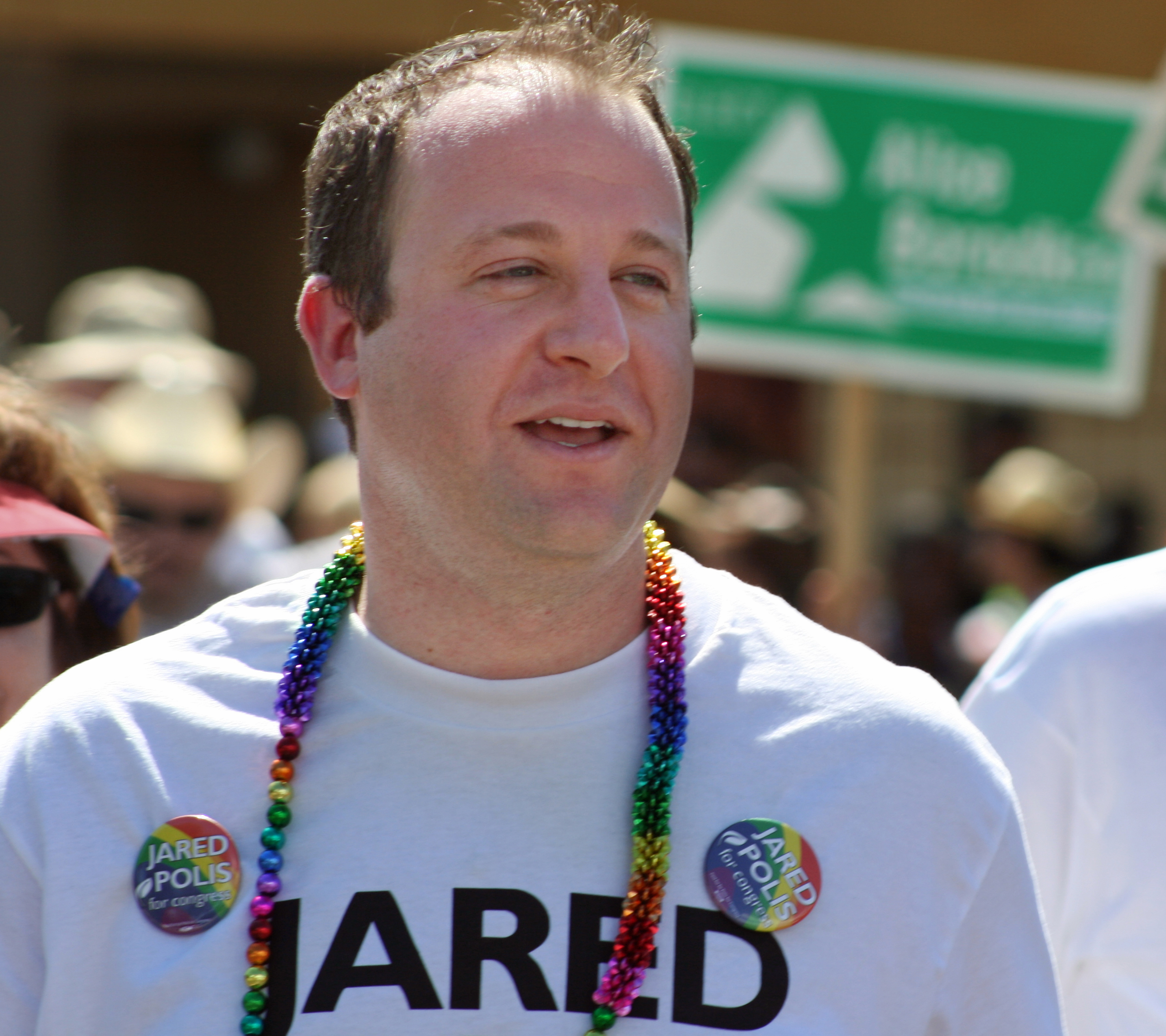
Polis campaigning in 2008

In 2008, Polis won a heavily contested Democratic primary election for Colorado's 2nd congressional district, and went on to win the general election on November 4 with 63% of the vote. He succeeded Mark Udall, who was elected to the United States Senate that year. Polis was reelected to the House in 2010 with 57% of the vote, in 2012 with 56% of the vote, in 2014 with 57% of the vote, and in 2016 with 57% of the vote.

=== Tenure ===
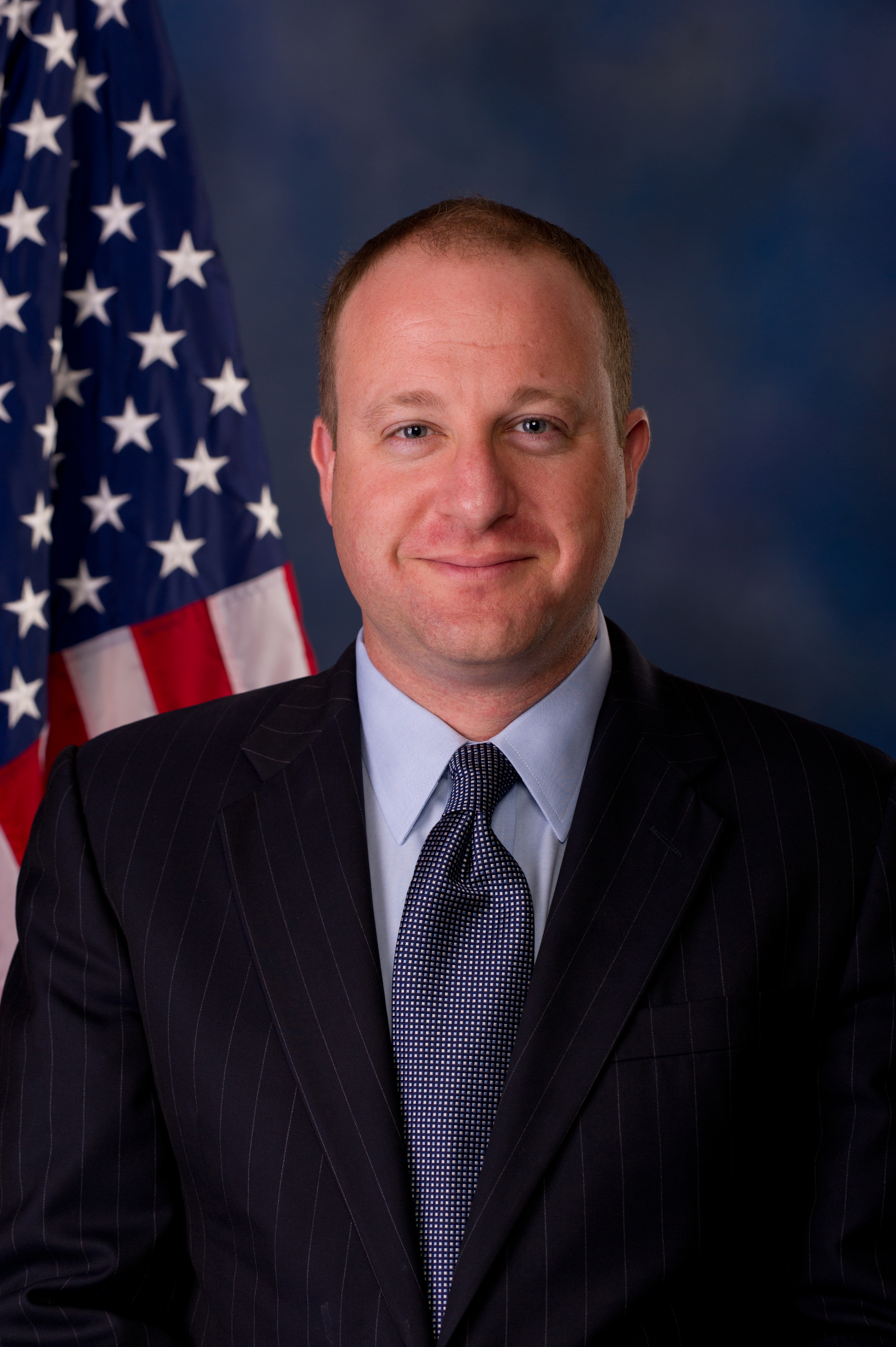
Polis during the 112th Congress

Polis was the Red to Blue program chair for the DCCC during the 2012 elections, helping recruit and raise money for Democratic candidates in competitive congressional districts. After the elections, he considered running for vice chair of the House Democratic Caucus after then-Chair Xavier Becerra was term-limited. The position went to Representative Joe Crowley.

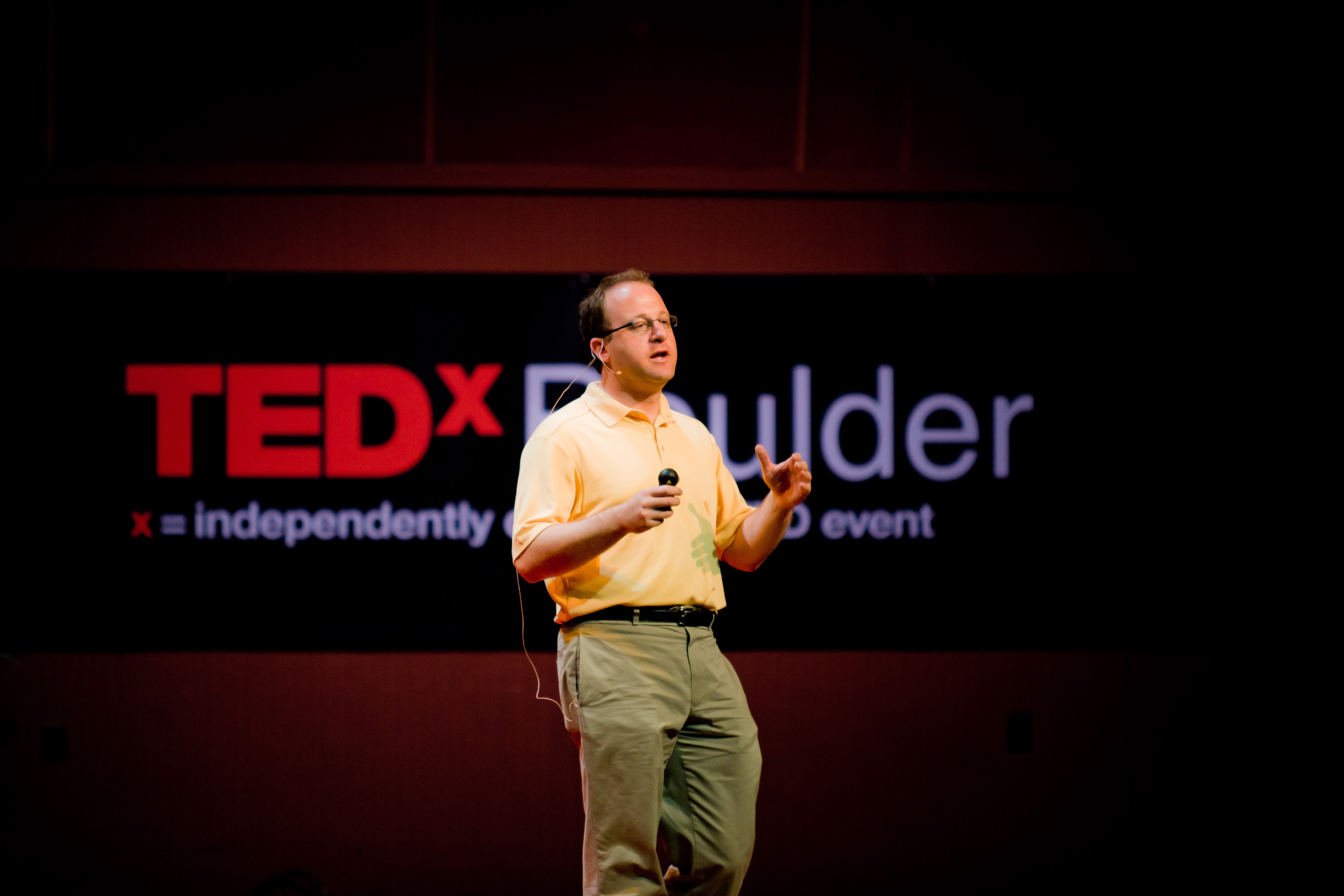
Polis during a TED Talk in 2010

==== Legislation sponsored ====
The following is an incomplete list of legislation Polis introduced:

- The Affordable College Textbook Act had been introduced in the 113th and 114th Congresses. Reintroduced by Polis in the 115th Congress, it again died in committee.

=== Committee assignments ===
In the 114th Congress, Polis served on the following committees:

- Committee on Education and the Workforce
  - Subcommittee on Higher Education and Workforce Training
  - Subcommittee on Health, Employment, Labor, and Pensions
- Committee on Natural Resources
  - Subcommittee on Energy and Mineral Resources
  - Subcommittee on Federal Lands
  - Subcommittee on Oversight and Investigations
- Committee on Rules
  - Subcommittee on Legislative and Budget Process

=== Caucus memberships ===
- Congressional Cannabis Caucus
- Congressional Progressive Caucus
- LGBT Equality Caucus (co-chair)
- Congressional Blockchain Caucus (co-chair)
- Mexico Caucus (co-chair)
- Nepal Caucus (co-chair)
- Veterinary Medicine Caucus
- New Democrat Coalition
- Congressional Arts Caucus
- Congressional NextGen 9-1-1 Caucus
- NO PAC Caucus
- Liberty Caucus
- U.S.-Japan Caucus
- Problem Solvers Caucus

== Governor of Colorado (2019–present) ==
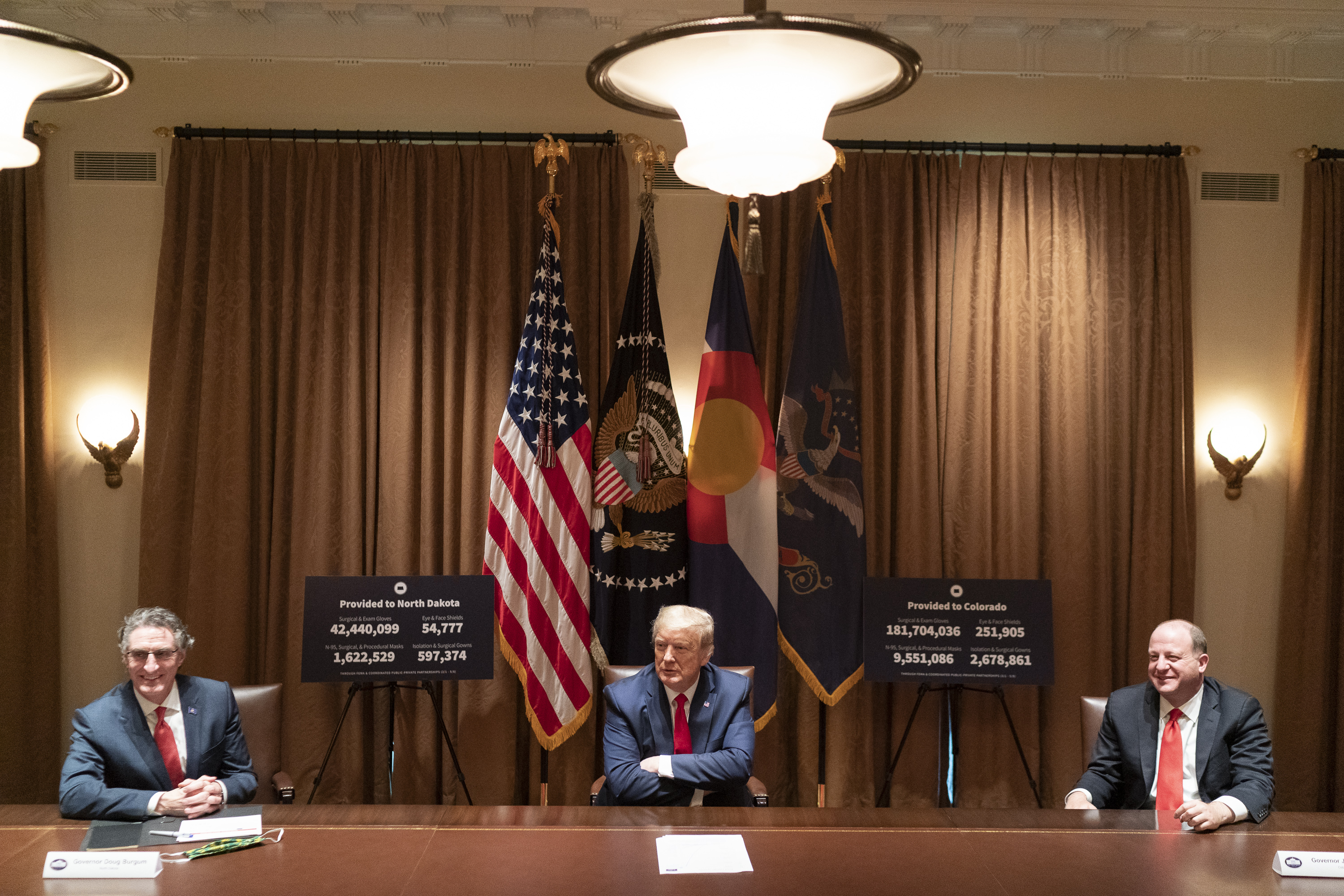
Polis with President Donald Trump and Doug Burgum in May 2020

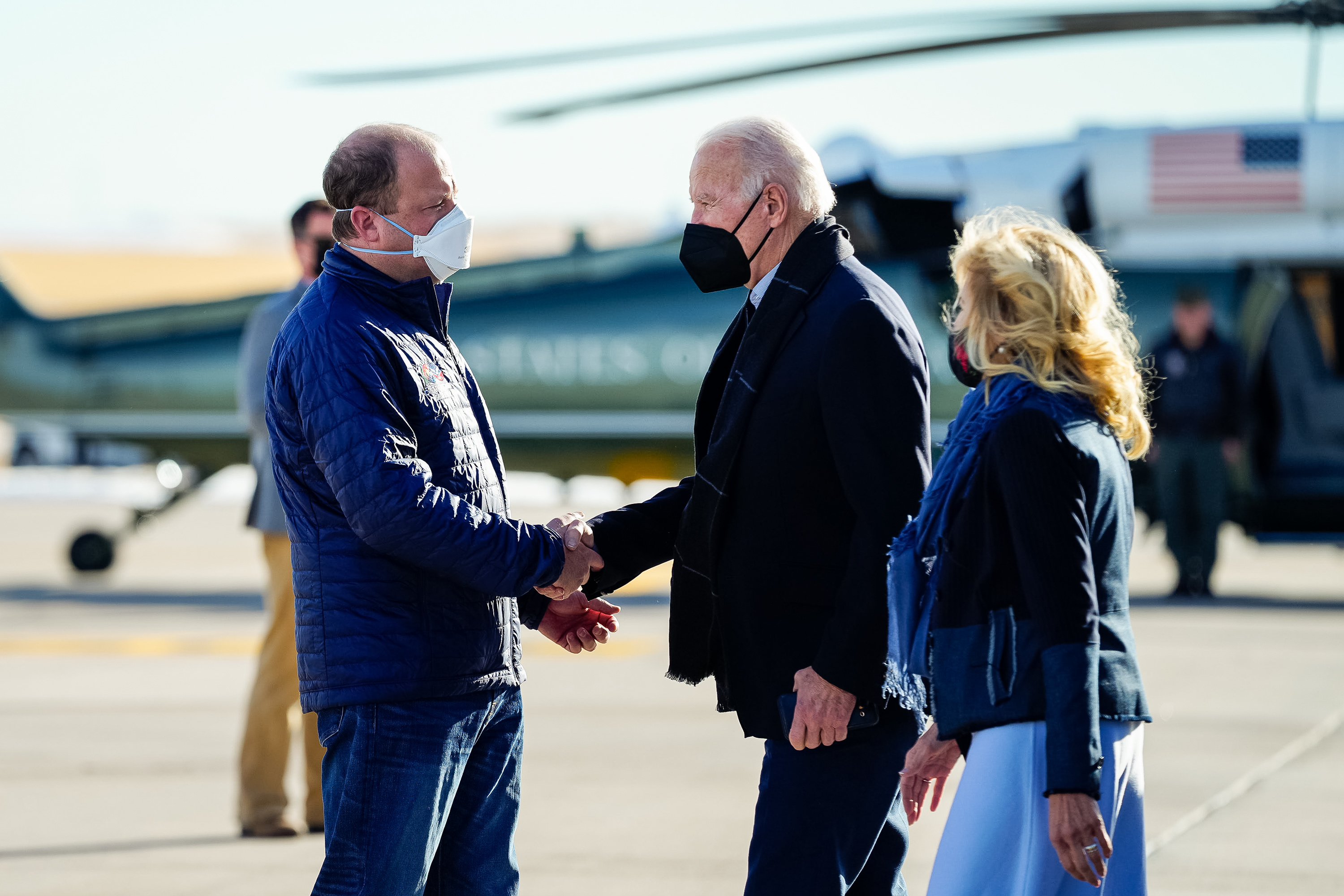
Polis with President Joe Biden in January 2022

=== Elections ===
==== 2018 ====
In 2018, Polis announced his candidacy for governor of Colorado. He was elected governor with 53.4% of the vote, defeating Republican nominee Walker Stapleton and becoming the first gay person elected governor of any state; the first gay person to serve as a state governor was Jim McGreevey, the 52nd governor of New Jersey, who disclosed his sexual orientation during his gubernatorial tenure.

==== 2022 ====
Polis won reelection to a second term, defeating Republican nominee Heidi Ganahl, a member of the University of Colorado Board of Regents.

=== Tenure ===
Polis was elected governor on November 6, 2018. Boldly Forward, a 501(c)4 nonprofit, was formed as the transition team, working with Keystone Center as facilitator. Polis was sworn in on January 8, 2019. An effort to recall him and other Democratic elected officials failed to submit any signatures; Polis said of the effort, "Recalls should not be used for partisan gamesmanship". In 2025, Polis had an approval rate of 41% and a disapproval rate of 52% among Colorado voters.

== Political positions ==
Polis has been described as both progressive and libertarian-leaning. He has spoken in favor of abortion rights, school choice, replacing Colorado's property tax with a land value tax, and eliminating Colorado's income tax. During the COVID-19 pandemic in Colorado, he was skeptical of enforcing the state's mask mandates for long periods of time, saying he personally wore masks but did not want "to force it on people". In 2022, the libertarian magazine Reason wrote that he was "the most libertarian governor in America". Polis has also called himself a "libertarian", but the characterization has been disputed by some libertarians, with critics pointing to his record on gun control, alcohol regulation, and taxes as inconsistent with libertarian principles.

=== Campus safety ===
In September 2015, Polis voiced support for altering university disciplinary processes surrounding campus rape to allow for cases to be judged against a reasonable likelihood standard, saying, "If there are 10 people who have been accused, and under a reasonable likelihood standard maybe one or two did it, it seems better to get rid of all 10 people ... we're not talking about depriving them of life or liberty, we're talking about them being transferred to another university, for crying out loud." After being criticized for these remarks, Polis apologized, saying that, "I went too far by implying that I support expelling innocent students from college campuses, which is something neither I nor other advocates of justice for survivors of sexual assault support".

=== Civil liberties ===
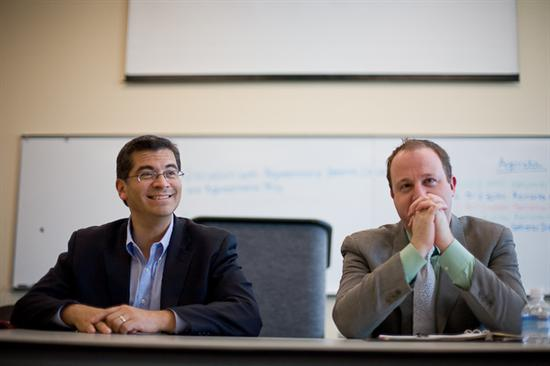
Polis (right) with then-Representative Xavier Becerra of California in Westminster, Colorado

==== Cannabis ====
Polis supports the legalization of cannabis, saying in 2011, "Just as the policy of prohibition failed nationally with alcohol—it's now up to states and counties—I think we should do the same with marijuana." Legislation he has introduced includes the Ending Federal Marijuana Prohibition Act in 2013, the Regulate Marijuana Like Alcohol Act in 2015, and the McClintock–Polis amendment in 2015 (to prevent federal interference in states that have legalized medical or recreational use; it failed 206–222). He was also an original cosponsor of the McClintock–Polis Amendment, introduced in 2015, and the Marijuana Justice Act, first introduced in the House in 2018. In February 2017, Polis launched the Congressional Cannabis Caucus along with Representatives Don Young, Earl Blumenauer, and Dana Rohrabacher. In 2021, he pardoned 1,351 Coloradans convicted of marijuana possession.

==== Internet piracy ====
Polis supports an open and free internet, and has been critical of SOPA, PIPA, and CISPA, saying in an interview with Forbes, "I oppose piracy and want to see intellectual property protected because that is what fosters and rewards innovation. But SOPA won't accomplish a meaningful reduction in piracy and causes massive collateral damage to the Internet ecosystem." While debating SOPA on the House floor Polis said that SOPA and PIPA "directly threaten the very internet that has brought humanity great prosperity and greater peace" and "Allowing the military and NSA to spy on Americans on American soil goes against every principle this country was founded on." Polis and 167 other House members voted against CISPA.

Polis and Representatives Zoe Lofgren and Darrell Issa sponsored Aaron's Law in the wake of the suicide of computer programmer and internet activist Aaron Swartz, the co-founder of Reddit, who was facing computer and wire fraud charges, more than 30 years in prison and fines of over $1 million for violating the terms of service for illegally downloading academic journal articles from the digital library JSTOR. The proposed bill would exclude terms of service violations from the 1986 Computer Fraud and Abuse Act and from the wire fraud statute. Polis said that the charges brought by US Attorney Carmen Ortiz were "ridiculous and trumped-up" and that "It's absurd that he was made a scapegoat. I would hope that this doesn't happen to anyone else."

==== Patriot Act ====
Polis has been a vocal opponent of the Patriot Act.

=== Cryptocurrency ===
In May 2014, Polis became the first U.S. representative and member of Congress to accept campaign donations via Bitcoin. In February 2022, Polis announced that Colorado would become the first state to allow its residents to pay state taxes with Bitcoin.

=== Energy ===
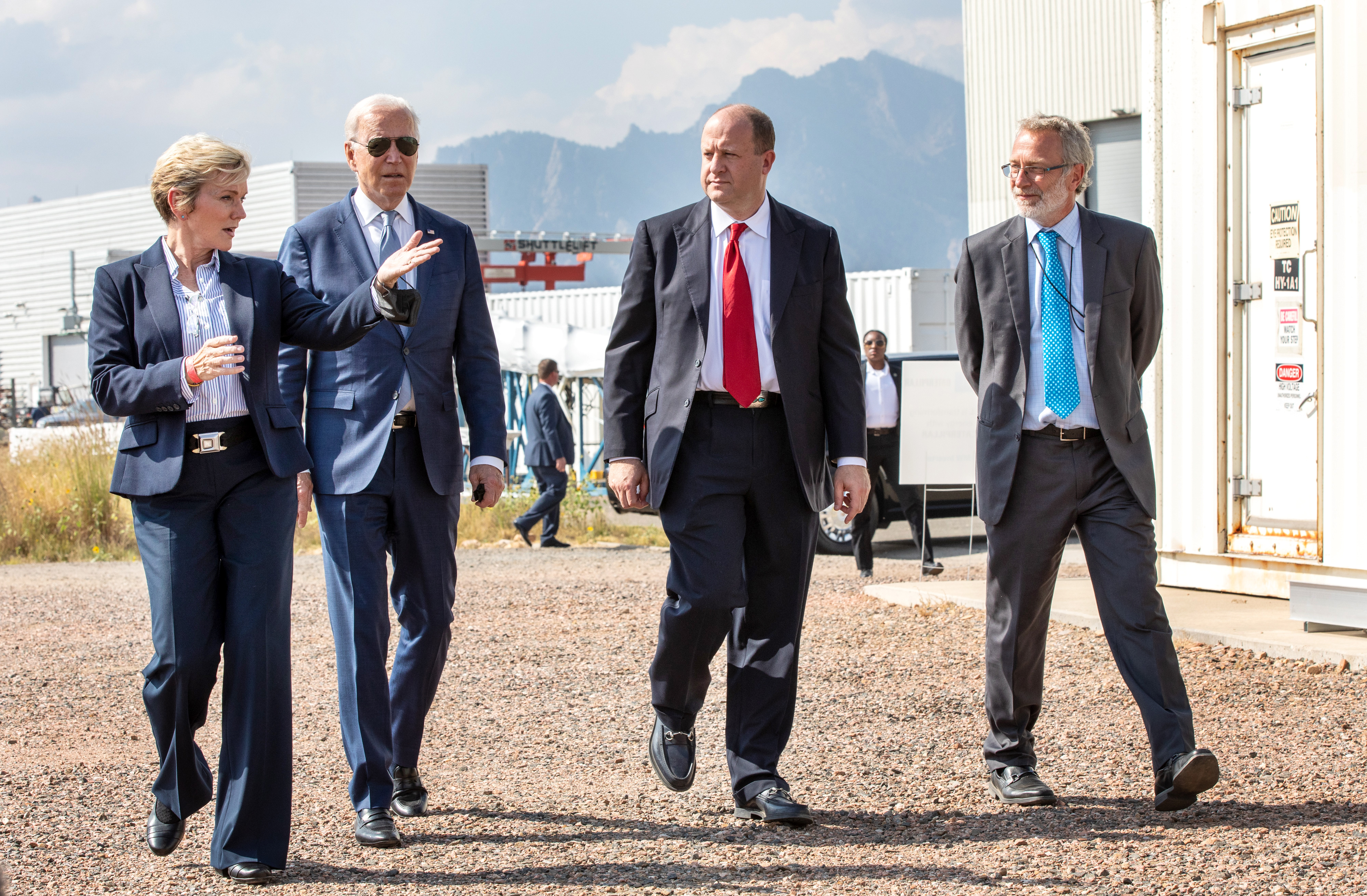
Secretary of Energy Jennifer Granholm (left) and President Joe Biden (second from left) visit a renewable energy laboratory in Colorado with Polis (second from right)

In 2014, Polis sponsored two ballot measures targeting hydraulic fracturing, Initiatives 88 and 89. He sought to move fracking from 500 feet (150 m) from people's homes to 2,000 feet (610 m) to improve homeowners' quality of life in affected areas. On August 4, 2014, Polis announced that he would withdraw his support for the two ballot measures.

=== Food safety ===
Polis has shown interest in the regulation of kombucha. He co-sponsored a bill that would have legalized the interstate shipment of raw milk.

=== Foreign policy ===
==== Afghanistan ====
In 2010, Polis supported a failed resolution to withdraw all troops from Afghanistan within 30 days, saying, "I don't believe that this ongoing occupation is in our national interest" and "I supported the initial action to oust the Taliban in Afghanistan, and that succeeded. The challenge we face now is a stateless menace." He also took a congressional delegation trip to Afghanistan, meeting with former Afghan Interior Minister Mohammad Hanif Atmar, U.S. military officials, and diplomats.

==== Iraq ====
Polis opposed the Iraq War, saying, "The invasion of Iraq was a colossal mistake and I opposed the war from the very beginning. Bush's blunders, and the Democrats who gave him cover along the way, have left us without easy solutions for improving the situation."

=== Healthcare ===
In May 2025, Polis vetoed a bill unanimously passed by the state legislature that would have banned surprise billing by ambulance companies. Because he waited until after May 7 to veto it, the legislature cannot override the veto until 2026.

==== Vaccines ====
Polis has called himself "pro-choice" on vaccines. In 2019, he opposed a major provision in House Bill 1312 that made it harder for parents to seek non-medical vaccine exemptions for their children. Polis was among the few Democrats who praised vaccine skeptic Robert F. Kennedy Jr., commending his work in "having helped us defeat vaccine mandates in Colorado" before later posting in support of getting vaccinated. He supported Trump's nomination of Kennedy for Secretary of Health and Human Services and wrote that he supported Kennedy's willingness to "take on big pharma and corporate ag" while avoiding rebuking him for his anti-vaccine ideas.

In an interview with Politico Magazine, Polis said that Democrats "need to speak to a larger coalition" of voters. He expressed disagreement with the Trump administration and noted that he is "not a fan" of its actions, and said he differs with Kennedy on certain issues, such as vaccine efficacy, but encouraged people to "investigate RFK's positions for themselves rather than attack Kennedy as a default." He argued that many Colorado Democrats share Kennedy's views on matters like health and nutrition and said that the Democratic Party "can't win without accepting a wider range of perspectives", including "welcoming voters that like RFK" and "voters that value freedom and liberty and government efficiency", saying that "those should be folks that we welcome to the Democratic Party and that we incorporate into our agenda."

=== Housing ===
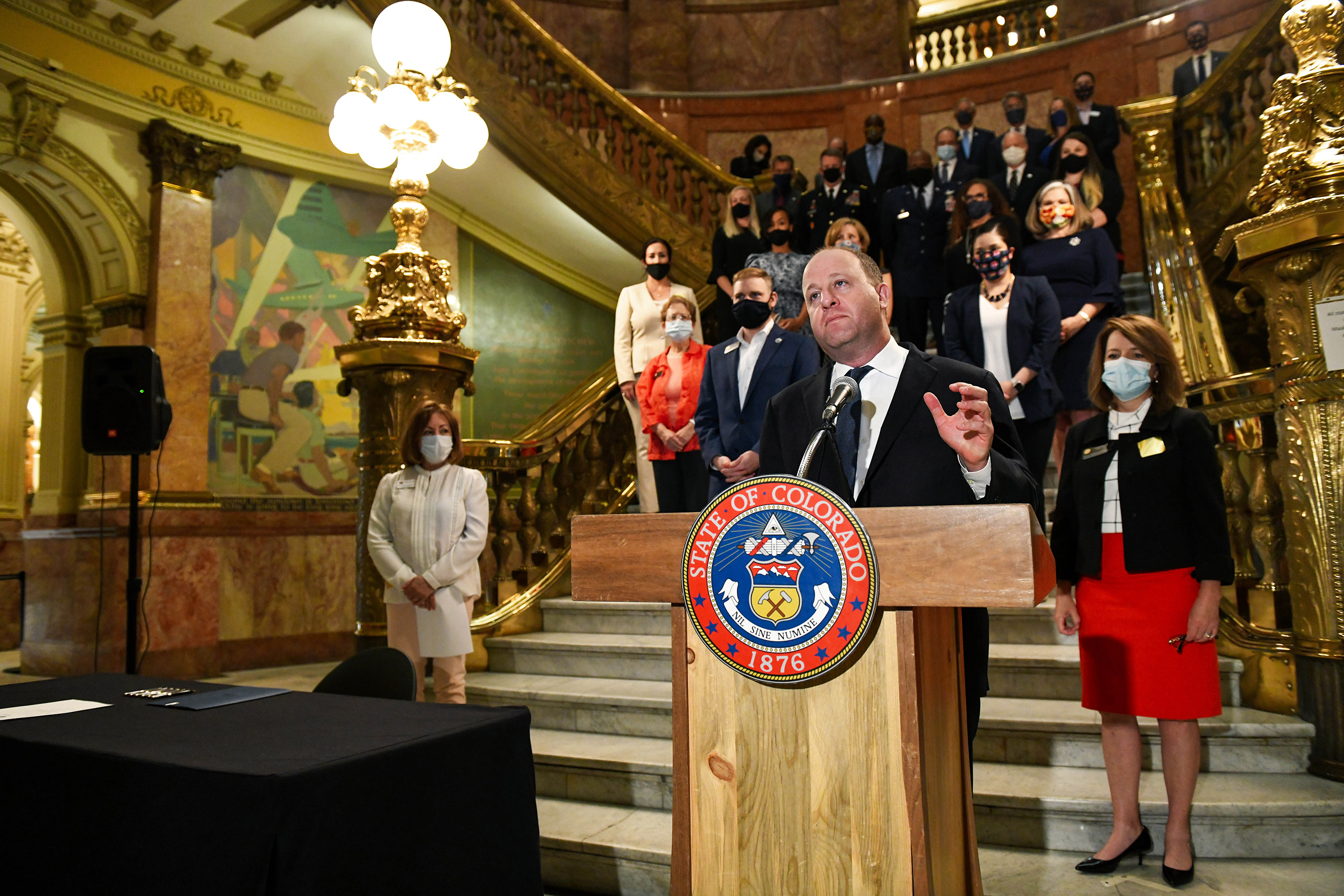
Polis speaks before signing HB 20-1326, which reduced the time and cost of obtaining certain state professional licenses

In May 2025, Polis vetoed a bill that would have banned the use of rent-fixing algorithms, which critics argued landlords were using to collude to charge the highest possible rents. Software company RealPage, a well-known provider of one such algorithm, applauded the veto, which it called an example of "courageous leadership".

=== Guns ===
In 2019, Polis signed a red flag law allowing law enforcement and family members to petition courts to strip away gun rights of those seen a danger to themselves or others. In 2023, Polis signed multiples pieces of legislation that have changed the gun rights landscape in Colorado. These included raising the purchasing age from 18 to 21, a three-day waiting after a purchase, and a ban on homemade firearms. In April 2025, Polis signed legislation creating a state gun registry, sharply limiting the ability to acquire semi-automatic weapons.

=== Immigration ===
During the U.S. border crisis, Polis relocated migrants via publicly sponsored buses to New York City and Chicago. On January 7, 2023, he said he would no longer send migrants to Chicago.

In January 2025, Polis said in his State of the State address that he hoped to work with Trump on securing the border but warned against "efforts to deport American citizens, to target those on pending legal status, to break up families", and he has since pressed the administration over the detention of an undocumented immigration and labor activist in Colorado.

=== LGBTQ ===
At the time of his departure from Congress, Polis was one of seven gay members of the 113th Congress, and caucused in the LGBT Equality Caucus. He pushed for the repeal of the Defense of Marriage Act (DOMA), and praised the Obama Administration's decision for the Justice Department to no longer defend DOMA, saying, "Section 3 of the law is unconstitutional."

Polis was also the leading sponsor of the Student Non-Discrimination Act (SNDA) with Senator Al Franken, who introduced the act in the Senate. SNDA would establish a comprehensive federal prohibition in all public and elementary and secondary schools of discrimination based on sexual orientation and gender identity, expanding Title IX of the Education Amendments Act to LGBT students. In a statement, Polis said "education is the right of every student" regardless of their actual or perceived sexual orientation or gender identity. "The alarming increase in teen suicides has shown us just how far we are from making our children's schools safe spaces." In a letter to Obama, Polis and 67 other House members urged the repeal of Don't Ask, Don't Tell. The letter cited a California district judge's ruling that DADT was unconstitutional and that the 14,000 service members who had been discharged from the military since its passage had been discharged unjustly.

In September 2014, Polis filed a discharge petition to bring the LGBT Employment Non-Discrimination Act to the House floor for a vote. The revised legislation included narrow religious exemptions. Polis urged Obama to reconsider the inclusion of Malaysia and Brunei in a Trans-Pacific Partnership because of their poor record on LGBT rights. In June 2019, Polis signed a bill banning conversion therapy for minors. In February 2022, he denounced anti-trans legislation being passed in Republican-controlled states, calling it "un-American". On April 14, 2023, he signed into law three health care bills enshrining access to abortion and gender-affirming procedures and medications in Colorado. The bills ensure people in surrounding states and beyond can have an abortion, begin puberty blockers, or receive gender-affirming surgery in Colorado without fear of prosecution. On April 29, 2024, Polis signed a law requiring public schools to use trans students' preferred names.

=== Social media ===
Polis vetoed Senate Bill 86, which would compel large social media companies to remove accounts engaged in illegal activity involving children under 13. On April 25, 2025, the Colorado Senate overrode the veto.

=== Trade and tariffs ===
Polis is a staunch advocate of free trade and has been a vocal critic of Trump's tariffs. He criticized a portion of an April 2025 speech by Michigan Governor Gretchen Whitmer in which she said there was room for some agreement with President Trump on tariffs but warned against Trump's use of the "tariff hammer", instead advocating for using tariffs like a scalpel. Polis tweeted: "The 'tariff hammer' winds up hitting your own hand rather than the nail. Tariffs are bad outright because they lead to higher prices and destroy American manufacturing. Trade is inherently good because both parties emerge better off from a consensual transaction. While sanctions (Russia, Iran) can have a geopolitical national security role, it should always be considered eyes wide open that sanctions harm both ourself and others."

=== Richard Hanania and Nicholas Decker ===
On Twitter, Polis wrote that he would "recommend following public intellectuals Richard Hanania and Nicholas Decker who are doing actual thinking which is rare these days". Hanania had previously expressed white supremacist opinions, while Decker had discussed controversial topics such as zoophilia and AI-generated child pornography. After criticism of Polis's post, his spokesperson told Denver 7, "The governor was clear in his post that he doesn't agree with the majority of what these individuals post, including those that you reference in your question. He believes many of their views are abhorrent. Governor Polis's focus remains on leading for Colorado, and that includes listening to opposing perspectives and finding ways to disagree better no matter where they land in the depths of social media."

=== Tina Peters clemency ===
On May 15, 2026, during his second term as governor, Polis announced that he would commute the sentence of Tina Peters, the former county clerk of Mesa County, Colorado. In 2024, Peters was convicted in state court on multiple felonies for her involvement in attempts to overturn the 2020 United States presidential election. The decision came after President Donald Trump had publicly advocated for Peters's release.

The governor-appointed Executive Clemency Advisory Board reportedly twice voted unanimously to reject Peters's clemency application before the commutation announcement.

The clemency announcement was condemned by the Colorado Democratic Party, the Democratic leadership of the Colorado House and Senate, the Colorado County Clerks Association, Senators Michael Bennet and John Hickenlooper, U.S. Representative Jason Crow, Colorado Attorney General Phil Weiser, Colorado Secretary of State Jena Griswold, Mesa County district attorney Dan Rubinstein, who had prosecuted Peters, and the Colorado branches of the AFL-CIO, SEIU, Common Cause, and League of Women Voters. On May 20, the Colorado Democratic Party censured Polis at a state committee meeting. In response to the backlash, Polis appeared on a video call with duct tape covering his mouth.

After the announcement, Bennet said that, because of the commutation, he would not consider Polis for the resulting Senate vacancy should he win the 2026 Colorado gubernatorial election.

The move was praised by Trump, U.S. Representative Lauren Boebert, state representative and gubernatorial candidate Scott Bottoms, The Denver Post editorial board, and Peters herself.

== Personal life ==
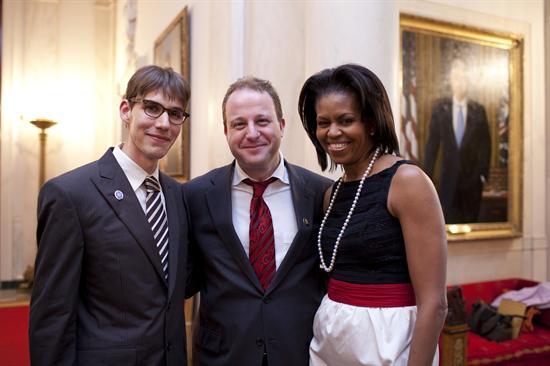
Polis (center) with his future husband Marlon Reis (left), and First Lady Michelle Obama at the White House, circa 2014

Polis was the first non-incumbent gay man elected to Congress, and the first gay parent in Congress. He is also the nation's second gay parent to hold state-level government office. Polis and his husband, Marlon Reis, have a son and a daughter, born in 2011 and 2014, respectively. Polis is Jewish.

In June 2019, to mark the 50th anniversary of the Stonewall riots, an event widely considered a watershed moment in the modern LGBTQ rights movement, Queerty named Polis one of the Pride50 "trailblazing individuals who actively ensure society remains moving towards equality, acceptance and dignity for all queer people". Polis enjoys video games such as League of Legends. His favorite champions include Maokai and Anivia. He is also an avid fan of the Colorado Avalanche, Colorado Rockies, Denver Nuggets, and Denver Broncos. He is a fan of South Park and interviewed the show's creators, Trey Parker and Matt Stone.

Polis has declared his love of Taylor Swift's music and has regularly made reference to this in public communications. Before Swift's Eras Tour arrived in Denver in July 2023, Polis posted a letter on his Instagram account with dozens of her song lyrics. In a March 2024 event on the Denver Capitol steps addressing education funding, he spoke under a friendship-bracelet–themed banner with the words "fully funded era" that many speculated was a reference to the Eras Tour. In his speech at the Democratic National Convention on August 21, 2024, he used lyrics from Swift's song "We Are Never Ever Getting Back Together". In July 2020, Polis donated $1,000 to Representative Ilhan Omar's primary opponent in her 2020 reelection campaign. In September 2021, Polis married his longtime partner, Marlon Reis, in a small Jewish Renewal ceremony with family and a few friends. The wedding took place at the University of Colorado Boulder, from which Reis graduated.

== Electoral history ==
Colorado gubernatorial election, 2018
Party	Candidate	Votes	%	±%
Democratic	Jared Polis	1,348,888	53.42%	+4.12%
Republican	Walker Stapleton	1,080,801	42.80%	−3.15%
Libertarian	Scott Helker	69,519	2.75%	+0.81%
Unity	Bill Hammons	25,854	1.02%	N/A
Total votes		2,525,062	100.0%	N/A
Democratic hold				

Colorado gubernatorial election, 2022
Party	Candidate	Votes	%	±%
Democratic	Jared Polis (incumbent)	1,468,476	58.53%	+5.11%
Republican	Heidi Ganahl	983,034	39.19%	−3.61%
Libertarian	Kevin Ruskusky	28,938	1.15%	−1.60%
American Constitution	Danielle Neuschwanger	21,623	0.86%	N/A
Unity	Paul Noël Fiorino	6,686	0.27%	−0.75%
Total votes		2,508,757	100.0%	N/A
Democratic hold				

U.S. House, 2nd district of Colorado (General Election)
Year	Winning candidate	Party	Pct	Opponent	Party	Pct	Opponent	Party	Pct	Opponent	Party	Pct
2008	Jared Polis	Democratic	63%	Scott Starin	Republican	34%	J. A. Calhoun	Green	2%	Bill Hammons	Unity	1%
2010	Jared Polis	Democratic	57%	Stephen Bailey	Republican	38%	Jenna Goss	Constitution	3%	Curtis Harris	Libertarian	2%
2012	Jared Polis	Democratic	56%	Kevin Lundberg	Republican	39%	Randy Luallin	Libertarian	3%	Susan P. Hall	Green	2%
2014	Jared Polis	Democratic	57%	George Leing	Republican	43%						
2016	Jared Polis	Democratic	57%	Nic Morse	Republican	37%	Richard Longstreth	Libertarian	6%			

== See also ==
- Congressional Progressive Caucus
- Libertarian Democrat
- List of Jewish members of the United States Congress
- List of LGBT members of the United States Congress
- List of openly LGBT heads of government
- List of the first LGBT holders of political offices in the United States

U.S. House of Representatives
Preceded by Mark Udall	Member of the U.S. House of Representatives from Colorado's 2nd congressional district 2009–2019	Succeeded by Joe Neguse
Preceded by Tammy Baldwin; Barney Frank	Chair of the Congressional Equality Caucus; 2013–2019	Succeeded by David Cicilline
Party political offices
Preceded by John Hickenlooper	Democratic nominee for Governor of Colorado; 2018, 2022	Succeeded by Phil Weiser
Political offices
Preceded by John Hickenlooper	Governor of Colorado; 2019–present	Incumbent
Preceded by Spencer Cox	Chair of the National Governors Association; 2024–2025	Succeeded by Kevin Stitt
U.S. order of precedence (ceremonial)
Preceded by JD Vance as Vice President	Order of precedence of the United States; Within Colorado	Succeeded by Mayor of city in which event is held
Preceded by JD Vance as Vice President	Order of precedence of the United States; Within Colorado	Succeeded by Otherwise Mike Johnson as Speaker of the House
Preceded by Jim Pillen as Governor of Nebraska	Order of precedence of the United States; Outside Colorado	Succeeded by Kelly Armstrong as Governor of North Dakota
