= Kabeltelevisie Amsterdam =

Dutch cable television provider acquired in 1995

Kabeltelevisie Amsterdam was a Dutch cable television provider that delivered its services to Amsterdam and surroundings. The company was based on an idea by Peter Jelgersma, considered the "father" of cable television in the Netherlands. In 1995, with approximately 400,000 subscribers, it was the third largest cable network in the Netherlands, being acquired by K2000 that year.

== History ==
Until 1977, viewers had access to only two channels (Nederland 1 and Nederland 2) via individual antennas or central antenna systems.

During 1981, KTA was known for housing a number of pirate television channels, who broadcast their programmes after closedown on the two Dutch channels, three German channels and two Flemish channels. As of August that year, the dedicated publication Free Radio Magazine referred to the following channels and frequencies:

- 2 - Nederland 1 carrying Legaal Amsterdam TV on Mondays and Wednesdays; TVA or Midnight Movies on Tuesdays, Odyssey on Thursdays, City on Fridays and Mokum on Saturdays and Sundays
- 5 - BRT 2 carrying Galactica on Mondays, Wednesdays and Saturdays and Decibel on Fridays; no station on Tuesdays, Thursdays and Sundays
- 7 - ZDF carrying Enterprise on Mondays and Tuesdays, WYZ-TV on Wednesdays, Fridays and Sundays; Omega on Thursdays and Saturdays
- 9 - ARD carrying King's on Mondays; MTV on Fridays and Sundays (Sundays depended on ISM TV); Satanische Omroep Stichting on Tuesdays and Thursdays, no station on Wednesdays or Saturdays
- 11 - Nederland 2 carrying Sinclair on Mondays and Fridays; City-TV on Tuesdays and Saturdays; Edison TV on Wednesdays, Thursdays and eventually Sundays
- 40 - NDR Fernsehen carrying STV on Mondays; Einstein TV on Tuesdays and Thursdays at night and Sundays at noon; PKP on Wednesdays; Via-Randstad on Fridays and Saturdays and Trans-American Television on Sunday nights
- 65 - BRT 1 carrying Early Bird Stads-TV on Mondays and Fridays, DOP TV on Saturdays, Luna TV on Sundays; no station Tuesdays through Thursdays

The company relayed a satellite feed of Programme One of Soviet Central Television via satellite in September 1981, which was viewed as illegal according to the Geneva Copyright Convention. In late October, KTA was now in charge of the relays, as PTT forbade retransmission of free-to-air foreign television channels coming from satellites.

On 16 June 1994, the municipal government of Amsterdam, who already owned 51% of the shares, wanted to take over the remaining 49%. In September, it had announced that it would instead sell the company and the nomination of UBS as its consultor in the sale process. The purpose of the sale was for the new company to use the infrastructure for digital technologies.

In the summer of 1995, before the standalone KTA brand was discontinued, KTA introduced an à la carte subscription system for pay-per-view movies, with four titles to choose from, mostly old comedies such as Peppi & Kokki, Benny Hill and On the Buses and B movies.

On 8 June 1995, the sale to A2000 was approved, a company owned by electronics giant Philips and American telecom holding US West. The proposal by mayor F. de Grave was approved by all parties minus the Greens, who were concerned that they were selling the cable network at a very low price. Under the terms of the contract, its basic package would have 20 to 26 TV channels and 30 to 39 radio stations; said package would be adjusted only in case of inflation. The cable network was later acquired by UPC Netherlands in 2000, and, later, by Ziggo from 2015.
