= Priority Telecom =

- Type: Public
- Industry: Telecommunications
- Headquarters: Schiphol-Rijk, Netherlands
- Website: www.prioritytelecom.com [OFFLINE]

Priority Telecom was a publicly listed Dutch telecommunications company that sells its services to businesses and governments in the Netherlands, Austria and Norway. Besides governmental organizations, they also work with health care, educational, financial services, utilities, security and retail markets. Priority Telecom owns a fiber network of over 11,000 km length.

It was bought by UPC Broadband and is now a part of Ziggo after the merger of UPC and Ziggo.
