= Marlon Reis =

First Gentleman of Colorado since 2019

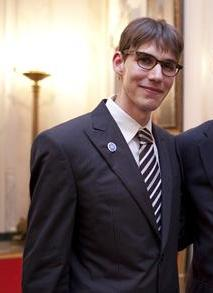

First Gentleman of Colorado
- Assumed role January 8, 2019
- Governor: Jared Polis
- Preceded by: Robin Pringle Hickenlooper (as first lady)

Personal details
- Born: July 1981 (age 45) Boulder, Colorado, U.S.
- Party: Democratic
- Spouse: Jared Polis (m. 2021)
- Children: 2
- Relatives: Susan Polis Schutz (mother-in-law)
- Education: University of Colorado at Boulder (BA)

Marlon Reis (born July 1981) is an American animal rights advocate, writer, and the first gentleman of Colorado. He is married to the 43rd governor of Colorado Jared Polis. He became the first same-sex first gentleman in the United States following the inauguration of Polis as governor on January 8, 2019.

== Early life and education ==
Reis was born in July 1981 in Boulder, Colorado, to a Jewish family from the East Coast. He earned a bachelor's degree from the University of Colorado at Boulder.

== First Gentleman of Colorado ==
Reis became the first gentleman of Colorado on January 8, 2019, following the inauguration of his partner (now husband) as governor of Colorado. Polis introduced Reis as the "first First Man" on election night. He served as an unofficial adviser to his partner's gubernatorial campaign for governor. As first gentleman, he has focused on animal rights and welfare, environmental and civil rights, and LGBT rights.

In addition to being first gentleman, Reis is a writer and has published his works in USA Today, CNN, and The Washington Post.

== Personal life ==
Reis met Colorado governor Jared Polis in 2002 while finishing his education. He and Polis married in September 2021 following an 18-year relationship. He and Polis have two children, born in 2011 and 2014. He is the son-in-law of poet Susan Polis Schutz and illustrator Stephen Schutz.

Honorary titles
Preceded by Robin Pringle Hickenlooper as First Lady	First Gentleman of Colorado; January 8, 2019 – present	Current holder
