= Get AS =

Former Norwegian cable company

- Type: Subsidiary
- Industry: Triple play
- Defunct: September 2020
- Successor: Telia Norge
- Headquarters: Oslo, Norway
- Key people: Stein-Erik Vellan (CEO); Stein-Erik Vellan (chairman)
- Products: Digital television, IPTV, internet, VoIP phone
- Revenue: NOK 1.806 billion (2011)
- Operating income: NOK 474.5 million (2011)
- Net income: NOK 417.3 million (2011)
- Total assets: NOK 2.160 billion (end 2011)
- Total equity: NOK 658.3 million (end 2011)
- Number of employees: 650 (2013)
- Parent: Telia Company
- Website: www.get.no

Get AS was a Norwegian cable television operator and internet service provider. Get had its head office in Oslo, with local offices in Drammen, Greåker, Arendal, Kristiansand, Stavanger, Haugesund, Bergen, Trondheim, and Stjørdal. Today, Telia operates a country-wide network under the Get brand. It has the second largest customer base of the providers in Norway. Until 2006, Get was a part of UPC Broadband. In September 2014, Get was purchased by Danish telecommunications company TDC A/S. In July 2018, Swedish telecom operator Telia Company has agreed to buy GET and TDC Norway for $2.6 billion. On 15 September 2020, the Get brand was phased out and replaced with the Telia brand.
