= Patti Hart =

- Education: Illinois State University, Business Administration
- Occupation(s): Executive, Author
- Website: antiretirement.com/about/

Patti S. Hart is a former executive and tech industry leader, speaker, and anti-retirement author. Before retiring, she served as the vice chairman of International Game Technology (IGT). She previously served as its CEO from April 2009 through April 2015, and has served on the company's board of directors since June 2006. She currently resides in Northern California with her husband Milledge.

== Early life and education ==
Hart grew up in Marseilles, Illinois. She received a Bachelor’s Degree in Business Administration from Illinois State University in 1978. In 2012, she was inducted into the University’s Hall of Fame and received its Distinguished Alumni Award in 2015.

== Career ==
Prior to joining IGT, Hart served as the chairman and chief executive officer of Pinnacle Systems Inc. from 2004 to 2005,Excite@Home Inc. from 2001 to 2002, and of Telocity Inc. from 1999 to 2001. Hart also held various management positions at the Sprint Corporation, including president and COO of Sprint's Long Distance Division. She was a founding member of the Global Gaming Woman Initiative, founded in 2011.

Hart has served on numerous public company boards, including Yahoo! Inc. and Korn/Ferry International Inc., and the board of the American Gaming Association. She has been a member of the Board of Trustees for the U.S. Soccer Federation since 2019. In 1998, Hart was listed on Fortune Magazine's inaugural list of Most Powerful Women.

== Publications ==
The Resolutionist: Welcome to the Anti-Retirement Movement by Patti and Milledge Hart. Published Advantage Media Group.
