= @Home Network =

Defunct American cable internet service

- Type: Subsidiary
- Industry: Telecommunication
- Founded: July 11, 1996
- Founder: William Randolph Hearst III
- Defunct: February 2002; 24 years ago
- Fate: Bankruptcy
- Successor: Ziggo
- Headquarters: United States
- Key people: William Randolph Hearst III (CEO)
- Products: Broadband Internet access
- Number of employees: 1,350
- Subsidiaries: Excite
- Website: home.com at the Wayback Machine (archived 2000-02-29)

@Home Network was an American high-speed cable Internet service provider from 1996 to 2002. It was founded by Milo Medin, cable companies Tele-Communications Inc. (TCI), Comcast, and Cox Communications, and William Randolph Hearst III, who was their first CEO, as a joint venture to produce high-speed cable Internet service through two-way television cable infrastructure. At the company's peak, it provided high-speed Internet service for 4.1 million subscribers in the United States, Canada, Japan, Australia, and the Benelux nations (Belgium, Netherlands, Luxembourg). The company operated as four joint ventures, three of which were international. In 1999, the company acquired Excite. In 2001, the original US company filed for bankruptcy in the US courts. During the bankruptcy process, the Japanese partner bought the @Home trademark for use in Japan and the Benelux partner bought the @Home trademark for use in Europe.

== History ==
The passing of the Telecommunications Act of 1996 enabled cable companies to start offering Internet telephony services to customers.

The company's first VP of engineering and later chief technology officer was Milo Medin, and the company got its start from venture capital firm Kleiner Perkins Caufield & Byers.

In December 1998, Excite was in merger negotiations with Yahoo! Inc. in an agreement to purchase the Excite portal for a price between $5.5 billion and $6 billion. On December 19, at Kleiner Perkins prompting, @Home Network's Chairman and Chief Executive Officer Thomas Jermoluk met with Excite's chairman and CEO George Bell, according to documents filed with the SEC, and a deal was hashed out for the purchase of Excite and its debt.

On January 19, 1999, @Home Networks acquired the Internet portal Excite. The $6.7 billion merger became one of the largest mergers of two Internet companies ever; the combined entity would marry @Home's profitable high-speed Internet network of @Home and expand its existing Home.com portal with Excite's money-losing search engine and Internet portal. The combined entity's external name became Excite@Home, however the stock symbol and regulatory filing records remained properly known as At Home Corporation (ATHM).

As a side effect of the deal, @Home's chairman and chief executive George Tom Jermoluk (also called T.J. for short) stepped down as chief executive officer but remained chairman of the board, and Excite's former chairman and chief executive George Bell, who was the president of the Excite division of @Home, moved over as chief executive of the new Excite@Home entity.

The new Excite division took the existing @home.com web portal that was provided to service subscribers and merged it with the Excite portal. Along with this was the movement toward personalized web portal content, a concept now commonplace in all Internet portals today.

In just months following the merger, Excite@Home's Excite division purchased iMall for about $425 million in stock. Most significant of these was the purchase of the online greeting card company Blue Mountain Arts, Excite@Home issued 11.2 million shares, worth close to $430 million, and paid $350 million in cash. In addition, Excite paid for sponsorship of Infiniti IndyCar driver Eddie Cheever, Jr., through the 2000 and 2001 Indy racing seasons for an undisclosed amount.

On June 10, 1999, the @Home cable division announced a joint venture with Australia with Cable & Wireless Optus to form a new company, AtHome Network Australia. The projected homes passed for the deal was 2.2 million.

The merger between Excite and @Home fell disastrously short of expectations. The stock which once soared at $128.34 a share in the first quarter of 1999 and had a market cap of $35 billion had fallen to $1 a share by the third quarter of 2001 when the company formally filed for Chapter 11 bankruptcy protection. The new Chief Executive George Bell worked from his home in Massachusetts and the Chief Financial Officer Mark McEachen lived in LA, flying in only once per week to the Bay Area to conduct business. Both executives were part of the former Excite executive team. More significantly, expenses ran far ahead of revenues. The burst of the dot-com bubble in March 2000 and the subsequent collapse of the Internet advertising market further limited the company's prospects by making it harder to raise investor money to keep the company afloat in the absence of retained earnings. By 2001, the company was running out of cash.

On September 21, 2000, George Bell stepped down as chief executive officer and reprised his role as president of the Excite division. The stock was trading at $15.38 a share, a drop of 90% of the company's evaluation during his leadership. On April 23, 2001, Patti S. Hart, the former chief executive officer of Telocity joined Excite@Home as its third CEO and @Home's fourth. In the same announcement, the outgoing chairman George Bell resigned and left the company completely. The news was not good, as the company also reported a first-quarter net loss of $61.6 million, or 15 cents per share, on revenue of $142.8 million compared with a loss of $4.6 million, or 1 cent, on revenue of $138 million in the same period the prior year.

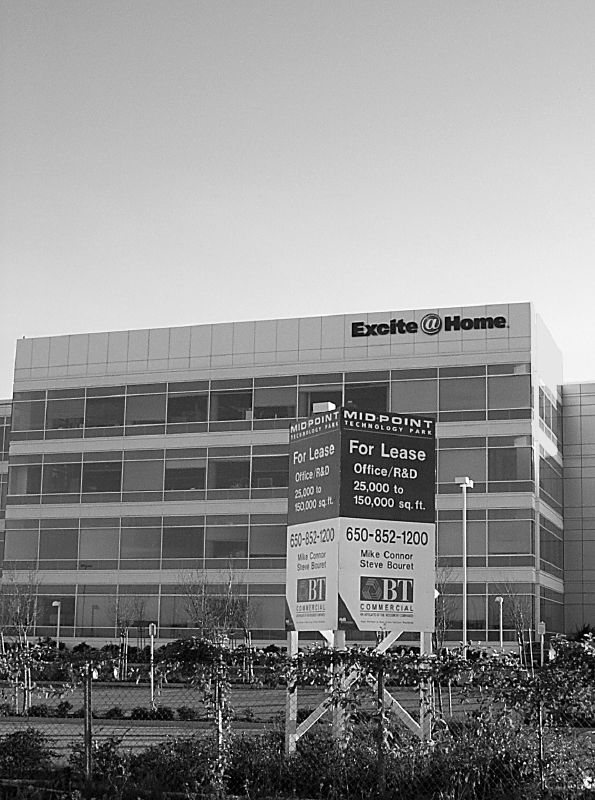
Excite@Home headquarters for sale. The buildings have since been re-purposed as a medical facility.

On June 11, 2001, Excite@Home announced that it had raised $100 million in fresh financing from Promethean Capital Management and Angelo Gordon & Co. Part of the deal not widely disclosed was that the loan was repayable immediately if Excite@Home stock was delisted by Nasdaq. The loan, structured as a note convertible into shares of Excite, had an interest rate of zero. The key aspect of the deal was that Promethean gained first dibs on Excite's assets.

By August 20, 2001, @Home fired their auditor firm Ernst & Young, replacing them with PricewaterhouseCoopers. In addition, they received a demand for the immediate repayment of $50 million in debt by bondholders Promethean Capital Management and Angelo Gordon & Co. At the same time, both Cox Cable and Comcast announced that they would separate from the broadband Internet service by Q1 of 2002.

On September 13, 2001, Excite@Home sold Blue Mountain Arts for $35 million to American Greetings, less than 5% of what they had paid less than two years earlier.

On October 1, 2001, the company filed for Chapter 11 bankruptcy protection with the U.S. Bankruptcy Court for the Northern District of California. The company's remaining 1,350 employees would be laid off over the following months into the first quarter of 2002. As part of the agreement, @Home's national high-speed fiber network access would be sold back to AT&T for $307 million in cash. At Home Liquidating Trust became the successor company to Excite@Home charged with the sale of all assets of the former company.

After the company's demise in February 2002, the four Excite@Home headquarters buildings at 450 Broadway Street in Redwood City, California, were purchased by Stanford University Medical Center, greatly remodeled, and reopened as the new home of the Stanford Medicine Outpatient Clinics in 2009. The shells were largely preserved, but the interiors are completely new, providing facilities that had been unavailable in the Palo Alto location. The buildings, plainly labeled Stanford Medicine, are easily visible from the freeway, U.S. 101, where the buildings labeled Excite@Home had previously been.

== Features ==
Features of the @Home network were fairly standardized from one cable provider to another cable provider. All users of the service were granted email addresses which were (username)@home.net. Users were also given a special content-rich start page on the Internet, which was specifically created for broadband speeds at a time when very few websites on the Internet were geared towards broadband users. Users were also granted access to other Excite websites such as Blue Mountain and their greeting card by email service. Also as part of the @Home experience, users were provided with a special Excite@Home web browser which was essentially an @Home re-branded version of Netscape Navigator with Excite@Home enabled features built within the browser. Additionally, besides the web browser users could also download the Excite@Home powered Instant Messenger, and @Home Assistant desktop widget, which had features like Excite's Search and current wire service news, along with an Internet radio portal known as "TuneIn" (which has no connection or relation to the current-day streaming provider of the same name).

== Cobranded @Home services ==
- AT&T@Home (formerly TCI@Home before the purchase of TCI by AT&T)
- Charter@Home
- Cogeco@Home
- Comcast@Home
- Cox@Home
- Optimum@Home
- Intermedia@Home
- Rogers@Home
- Shaw@Home
- SusCom@Home
- Optus@Home
- Videon@Home

In total Excite@Home offered services to a total of 16 affiliates across the United States and Canada. This included: Cablevision Systems, Century Communications, Charter Communications, Cogeco Cable, Comcast, Cox Communications, Garden State Cable, Insight Communications, InterMedia Partners, Jones Intercable, Midcontinent Cable, Prime Cable, Rogers Cablesystems, Shaw Communications, Suburban Cable, Susquehanna Communications, and Videon Cablesystems with access to over 60 million households.

== @Home Benelux ==
In 1999, @Home Network founded @Home Benelux BV, together with Intel Corporation and the (now former) Dutch companies EDON NV & Palet Kabelcom BV. @Home Benelux BV was based in Amsterdam. Later, N.V. Energie-Distributiebedrijf Oost- en Noord-Nederland (EDON) (then called Essent) got full ownership of @Home Benelux BV, and the company was called Essent Kabelcom. In February 2007, Essent sold Essent Kabelcom to private equity firms Warburg Pincus and Cinven, and the company was once again called @Home (now without the 'Benelux'-part). On May 16, 2008, @Home merged with cable providers Casema and Multikabel into Ziggo, thus becoming the largest cable provider of The Netherlands.

== Chief executive officers ==
- William Randolph Hearst III 1996–1997
- Thomas Jermoluk 1997–2000
- George Bell 2000
- Patti S. Hart 2001–2002

== Joint ventures ==
- Cable & Wireless Optus
- Chello
- Excite Chello
- @Work
- @Home Solutions
