= Susan Polis Schutz =

American poet and businesswoman (born 1944)

- Born: Susan Polis; May 23, 1944 (age 82); Peekskill, New York, U.S.
- Education: Rider University (BA)
- Children: Jared Polis (son), Jorian Schutz (son), Jordanna Schutz (daughter)
- Relatives: Marlon Reis (son-in-law)

Susan Polis Schutz (born May 23, 1944) is an American poet, filmmaker and businesswoman who co-founded the greeting card and book publisher Blue Mountain Arts. She is the mother of Colorado Governor Jared Polis.

== Early life and education ==
Schutz was born in Peekskill, New York, and is the daughter of June (née Keller) and David Polis. Her grandparents were Jewish immigrants from Russia. Schutz earned a Bachelor of Arts degree from Rider University in 1966, where she studied English and biology.

== Career ==
After earning her undergraduate degree, Schutz worked as a teacher and social worker in the Harlem neighborhood of Manhattan. She also took graduate courses in psychology and worked as a freelance writer for local publications.

In 1986, she published To My Daughter With Love on the Important Things in Life, through her company Blue Mountain Press. It is a book of poetry dedicated to her daughter. Stephen Schutz, Susan's husband and Jordanna's father, designed and illustrated it.

Schutz and Blue Mountain Arts came to wider attention with the founding, in 1996, of the bluemountain.com website. One of the earliest experiments with the electronic greeting card medium, the site was widely adopted by web users. In 1999, the dot-com venture Excite@Home bought bluemountain.com in a deal valued at $780 million. The 1999 price paid for bluemountain.com became an example of what was later seen as the excesses of the dot-com bubble: the website was sold again in 2001, to greeting card company American Greetings, for just $35 million in cash.

Schutz is the executive producer and director of the documentary film Anyone and Everyone. The film featured the coming-out stories of gay sons and daughters, and their parents and premiered on KPBS public television in San Diego, California, in August 2007, before being scheduled to air on a number of other public television stations in the United States.

Her film, "Love Wins Over Hate", was released in 2020. The film, released months after the George Floyd protests, attempts to "[uncover] the origins and complexities of hatred in America." In a series of interviews with several white men who had previously held beliefs of white supremacy, Susan aims to examine how the men were able to change and overcome their racism over the course of the documentary. The film was released on October 7th, 2020 to positive reception.

== Personal life ==
Schutz has two grandchildren through her son Jared and son-in-law Marlon Reis.
