= UPC Netherlands =

Defunct Dutch cable company

UPC Nederland B.V.
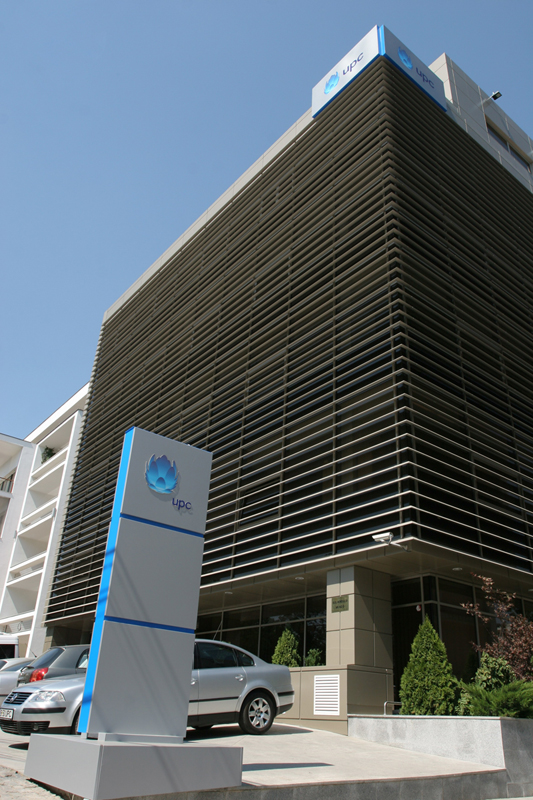
- Company type: Subsidiary
- Industry: Telecommunications
- Founded: 1998; 28 years ago
- Defunct: 2015
- Successor: Ziggo
- Headquarters: Amsterdam, Netherlands
- Area served: Parts of: Flevoland; Friesland; Gelderland; North Brabant; North Holland; South Holland
- Products: Cable television Broadband Internet; Telephony
- Parent: Liberty Global
- Website: upc.nl

UPC Nederland (English: UPC Netherlands) was the second largest cable operator in the Netherlands, providing cable television (digital and analogue), broadband Internet, and telephone service to both residential and commercial customers.

In early 2015, UPC Nederland started merging with Ziggo. The name UPC was finally phased out in favor of Ziggo on 13 April 2015.

== History ==
UPC Nederland was formed in 1995 as a joint venture between the Philips Electronics and United International Holdings, a United States-owned media company, setting off on a path of quick acquisition of the Netherlands' then mostly regional TV cable operators, many of whom were already partially owned by Philips. The South-Eastern and Eastern cable networks were unified under the UPC name in 1998, with other networks, the largest being the Amsterdam A2000 network, joining later.

Some of the larger cable companies bought by UPC were: A2000 (Amsterdam and surrounding regions, which absorbed the former KTA in 1995), Telekabel (Gelderland, Brabant, and Friesland), Gelrevision (Northern part of the Veluwe, South-east Flevoland and East Gelderland), Eneco K&T (Rotterdam and surrounding regions), Combivisie (Brabant) and several smaller and mid-sized networks.

UPC Nederland owned premium television service CineNova in a joint venture with Buena Vista International Television and Sony Pictures Entertainment between 2000 and 2005. The two CineNova channels closed on 18 May 2005, being replaced by the Canal+ Netherlands suite of pay-TV channels, subsequently renamed Film1.

On 27 January 2014 Liberty Global announced that it would acquire Ziggo. In December 2014 the shares of Ziggo N.V. were delisted from Euronext Amsterdam as Ziggo was converted into the Dutch private limited company Ziggo Holding B.V. (Besloten Vennootschap), owned by Liberty Global. On 5 January 2015 Ziggo started to harmonize its cable network with the UPC Nederland cable network. The name UPC was finally phased out in favor of Ziggo on 13 April 2015.

== Services ==
UPC Nederland offered analogue and digital cable television, broadband Internet access, and voice over IP telephone services.

=== Cable television ===
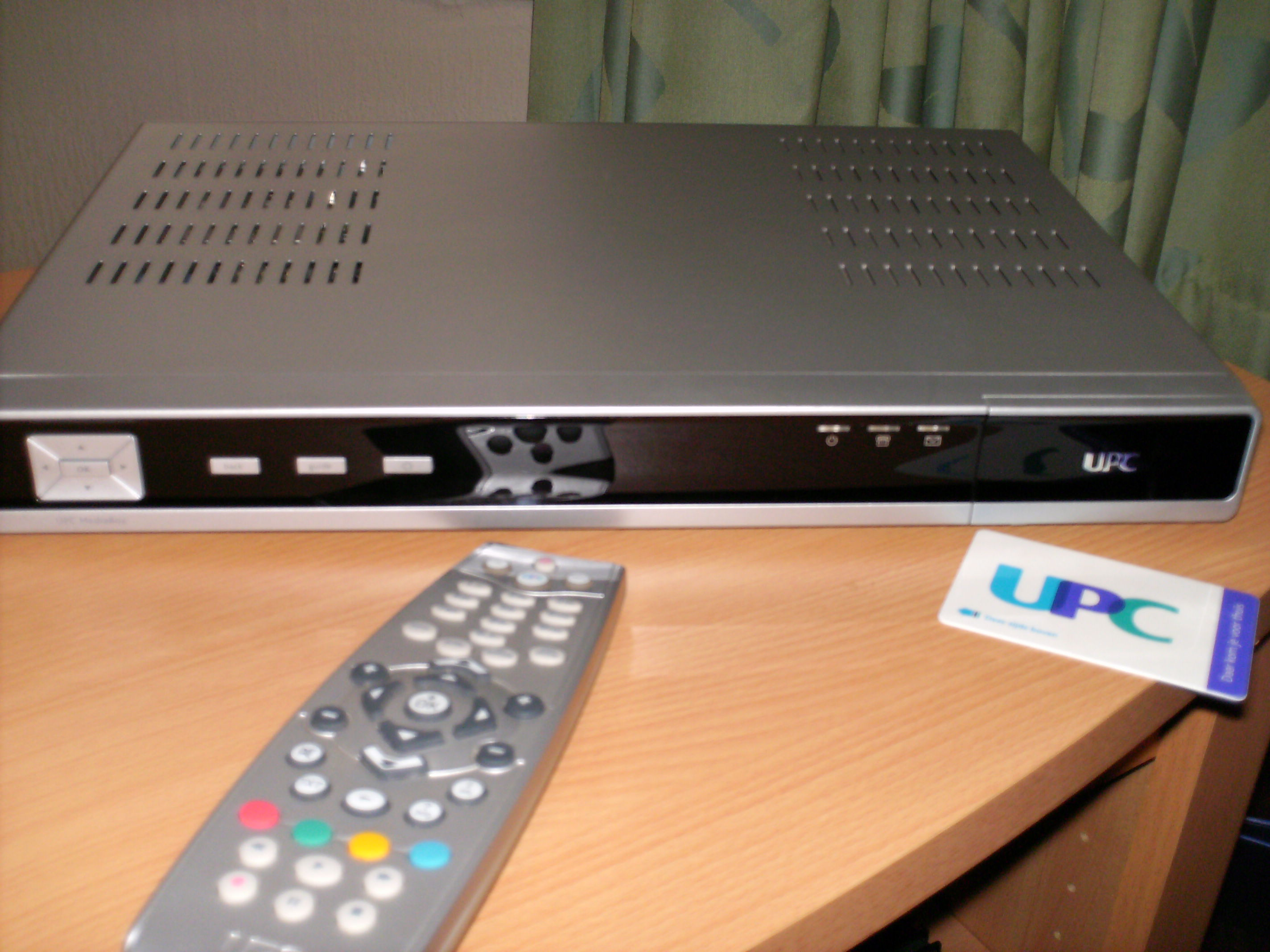
A Pace set-top box with a UPC smart card and remote, used by UPC Nederland.

==== Digital television ====
UPC Nederland provided about 200 television channels including about 51 in HD and also more than 100 radio channels, DVR service, video-on-demand content, catch-up TV from public television broadcasters and commercial television stations and interactive television using the DVB-C specification. UPC did use the Nagravision conditional access system. Nevertheless, about 40 TV channels and also 40 radio channels were transmitted in clear (unencrypted).

The new high-end set-top box called Horizon got its first release in the Netherlands on 7 September 2012. It incorporates television, internet and telephone services in one device. It has six tuners, a modem and a router on board.

==== Analogue television ====
There were about 30 analogue television channels and about 40 analogue radio channels available.

=== Internet ===
UPC Nederland was in 2008 the first cable company in Europe to be using the new EuroDOCSIS 3.0 cable standard. This new standard made it possible to achieve speeds comparable to fiber, up to 120 Mbit/s. As of July 2014, UPC offered the following subscription forms:

Name	Download speed	Upload speed	Monthly cost
50 Mbit/s Internet	50 Mbit/s	5 Mbit/s	N/A
120 Mbit/s Internet	120 Mbit/s	12 Mbit/s	N/A
200 Mbit/s Internet	200 Mbit/s	20 Mbit/s	N/A

Internet subscriptions included a Basic Cable TV and Radio (both analog and digital) subscription.

== See also ==
- Digital television in the Netherlands
- Internet in the Netherlands
- List of cable companies in the Netherlands
- Television in the Netherlands
- UPC Broadband
