= Vodafone Netherlands =

Mobile phone company in the Netherlands

- Type: Subsidiary
- Industry: Telecommunications
- Founded: September 1995; 31 years ago (as Libertel)
- Founder: Nationale-Nederlanden
- Headquarters: Maastricht, Netherlands
- Key people: Stephen van Rooyen (CEO)
- Products: Mobile telephony Wireless broadband
- Parent: VodafoneZiggo
- Website: www.vodafone.nl

Vodafone Libertel B.V. is the third largest mobile phone company in the Netherlands, and was previously called Libertel. It is part of VodafoneZiggo, a joint venture between Ziggo and Vodafone Group.

It offers 2G GSM, 2.5G GPRS on the 900 MHz frequency band, 4G LTE on the 800 MHz, 1500 MHz, 1800 MHz, 2100 MHz and 2600 MHz frequency bands, and 5G NR services via dynamic spectrum sharing (DSS) on band n3 (1800MHz) and non-DSS on band n28 (700MHz) and band n78 (3500MHz). It previously offered UMTS, HSDPA, and HSPA+ 3G services (on the 2100 MHz frequency band) until their shutdown in February 2020.

Vodafone Netherlands currently has 5.584 million mobile customers. Vodafone Netherlands currently operates one subbrand using its network called hollandsnieuwe (launched in January 2011).

As of 2008, Vodafone Netherlands is based in Maastricht and Amsterdam and has around 2,800 employees.

== History ==
Logo of the original company

Libertel was founded in September 1995 with financial backing from Nationale-Nederlanden (NN) to compete with KPN. Libertel was the second company in the Netherlands to get a license for offering GSM services (after PTT Telecom).

The corporate structure started with a holding partnership named CV Gemeenschapplijk Bezit Libertel containing three wholly owned subsidiaries: Libertel Groep B.V. (the holding company), Libertel B.V. (the cellular network operator), and Liberfone BV (the service provider).

The six original shareholders were ING, Vodafone, Vendex, Liof, Internatio-Müller, and Macintosh Retail Group. In early 1998, Vendex and Liof both sold their shares for 120 million guilders. Internatio-Müller and Macintosh each sold their shares for 48 million guilders. By the end of 1998, ING lowered its share from 52% to 30%, leaving Vodafone with 70%.

=== Vodafone acquisition ===
In June 1999, Libertel went public on the Amsterdam Stock Exchange as Libertel NV (ticker symbol: LTEL). Following the IPO, ING retained 5% (down from 30%) while Vodafone's share of 70% remained unchanged. In 2000, Vodafone changed the brand name for Libertel to "Libertel-Vodafone".

In 2002, Libertel-Vodafone was rebranded to "Vodafone" and saw subsequent branding changes by the Vodafone Group. Other Vodafone subsidiaries also went through a similar transition, aiming to establish the first global mobile telecommunications company with a familiar 'look and feel' throughout the world.

Vodafone Group performed a buyout in 2003 of the shares in Vodafone Libertel N.V. that it did not already own. At this time, Libertel was delisted from the Euronext Amsterdam stock market. in favour of Vodafone Libertel BV Dutch subsidiary Vodafone Group's pre-existing Dutch.

On 30 September 2007, Vodafone Libertel changed its type of business entity type from NV to BV, henceforth trading as Vodafone Libertel BV.

In 2011, the Macintosh Retail Group sold BelCompany and Telefoonkopen.nl to Vodafone Netherlands for 120 million euro. By 2016, Vodafone had either closed or rebranded the BelCompany stores.

On 3 April 2012, Vodafone Libertel acquired Telespectrum Telecommunicatie B.V.

On 1 October 2015, Vodafone Libertel acquired mITE Systems B.V.

=== Ziggo merger ===
A merger was announced on 16 February 2016 with Ziggo. The European Commission approved the merger in August 2016, on the condition that Vodafone splits off its fixed-line internet business. The new parent company for both Ziggo and Vodafone, called VodafoneZiggo, with a 50/50 joint ownership by Ziggo and Vodafone, was created on 31 December 2016.
