= BelCompany =

- Industry: Mobile phones
- Founded: 1995; 31 years ago
- Founders: Macintosh Retail Group, Pon Holdings
- Defunct: 2011
- Fate: Acquired by Vodafone Netherlands
- Parent: Vodafone Netherlands
- Website: belcompany.nl at the Wayback Machine (archived 2010-02-04)

BelCompany was a Dutch store-chain that specialises in mobile phones. It was founded in 1995 by Macintosh Retail Group and Pon Holdings, and is currently part of Vodafone Netherlands.

In 2011, BelCompany had 176 stores in the Netherlands, and daughter-chain Telefoonkopen.nl had 34 stores. In 2010 the company had a revenue of 181.3 million euro. The chain was headquartered in Veenendaal.

== History ==
In 1995 the first store was opened in Zaandam. In 1997 it opened a business branch named BelCompany Business Solutions. Macintosh Retail Group became sole owner of BelCompany in 1998.

In 2008 BelCompany and Macintosh founded the chain Telefoonkopen.nl. In 2011 this chain had 34 stores.

In 2009 Macintosh Retail Group sold the Belgian stores of BelCompany to Telenet. The Belgian stores still work under the commercial name BelCompany but are officially named Telenet Mobile NV. In 2011 Macintosh Retail Group sold BelCompany and Telefoonkopen.nl to Vodafone Netherlands for 120 million euro.

Vodafone since rebranded some of the BelCompany stores to Vodafone stores, and closed the remaining ones by 2016.
