= Casema =

Dutch cable operator

- Logo as of 2006
- Company type: Private
- Industry: Telecommunications
- Founded: 7 January 1970; 56 years ago
- Defunct: 2008
- Fate: Merged with Ziggo
- Headquarters: The Hague, Netherlands
- Products: Cable television Internet connectivity Fixed line telephony
- Number of employees: c. 800
- Website: casema.nl at the Wayback Machine (archived 2002-09-26)

Other logo of Casema as of 2001

Casema (Centrale Antenne Systemen Exploitatie Maatschappij) was a major Dutch provider of cable television, internet and telephone services until the merger with Multikabel and @Home to Ziggo on 16 May 2008. The company was mainly active in and around the cities of The Hague, Amersfoort, Utrecht, Amstelveen, and Breda.

Casema was founded on 7 January 1970 and was at that time mainly concerned with cable television. Until 1998, it was owned by KPN (75%) and Netherlands Public Broadcasting (25%). The company was then sold to France Télécom, who in turn sold Casema to the Carlyle Group, GMT Communications and Providence Equity Partners in 2003.

In July 2006, Cinven and Warburg Pincus purchased the company for €2.1 billion. The new owners also bought Multikabel and @Home, two other cable companies. From 16 May 2008, the three companies were merged to form Ziggo.

At the time of the merger, Casema had approximately 1.4 million customers. The merged company has approximately 3.3 million customers.

== See also ==
- Digital television in the Netherlands
- List of cable companies in the Netherlands
- Television in the Netherlands
