= Ziggo =

Dutch cable operator

Ziggo Holding B.V.
- Type: Division
- Industry: Telecommunications
- Predecessors: Multikabel @Home; Casema; UPC Nederland
- Founded: 16 May 2008; 18 years ago
- Founder: Multikabel @Home; Casema; UPC Nederland
- Headquarters: Utrecht, Netherlands
- Area served: Europe
- Key people: Ritchy Drost (Interim CEO)
- Products: Cable television IPTV; Digital television Internet; Telephony; Mobile Telephony
- Revenue: ▲€ 1,564.8 million (2013)
- Net income: ▲€ 347.3 million (2013)
- Number of employees: 2,571 FTE (2013 avg.)
- Parent: VodafoneZiggo
- Website: ziggo.nl

Previous Ziggo logo

Ziggo Holding B.V. (Dutch pronunciation: [ˈzɪɡoː] or [ˈzɪɣoː]) is the largest cable operator in the Netherlands, providing digital cable television, Internet, and telephone service to both residential and commercial customers.

== History ==
The company is the result of the merger between Multikabel, @Home, and Casema and launched officially on 16 May 2008. Later followed by a merger with UPC Nederland in the first quarter of 2015, at that time the second largest cable company in the Netherlands. It kept the brand name Ziggo. Its main competitors are KPN and CanalDigitaal.

Most of the share capital was up to 2012 held by holding companies of two private equity firms: Cinven and Warburg Pincus.

On 21 March 2012, Ziggo was listed on the NYSE Euronext stock exchange and later incorporated into the midcap equity AMX index. Additionally, there are options traded on the Ziggo share.

Cinven and Warburg Pincus started to reduce their stake in Ziggo and exited Ziggo in April 2013.

In March 2013, Liberty Global acquired a 12.65% stake in Ziggo. This grew to 15% in April and 28.5% in July.

On 27 January 2014, Liberty Global announced that it would be acquiring all remaining shares in Ziggo for €10 billion. The takeover was subject to regulatory approval and was expected to close by the second quarter of 2014, when Ziggo was expected to merge with UPC Nederland. In May 2014, the European Commission announced opening an in-depth investigation to assess whether the proposed acquisition of Ziggo by Liberty Global is in line with the EU Merger Regulation. The opening of an in-depth inquiry does not prejudge the outcome of the investigation. In November 2014, Liberty Global took over Ziggo. In December 2014, the shares of Ziggo N.V. were delisted from Euronext Amsterdam as Ziggo was converted into the Dutch private limited company (besloten vennootschap) Ziggo Holding B.V.

On 5 January 2015, Ziggo started to harmonize its cable network with the UPC Nederland cable network. The name UPC was finally phased out in favor of Ziggo on 13 April 2015.

On 15 February 2016, British telecommunications company Vodafone announced the merger of their Dutch operations Vodafone Netherlands with Liberty Global, the owner of Ziggo. The deal was closed on 31 December, creating a new parent company for both Ziggo and Vodafone, called VodafoneZiggo, with a 50/50 joint ownership by Ziggo and Vodafone.

== Network structure ==
In 2014 the Ziggo hybrid fiber-coaxial cable network (a broadband network that combines optical fiber and coaxial cable) passed 7.140 million homes in the Netherlands. In 2020 it consisted of 40,350 km (25,072 mi) of fiber-optic cables that transported 97% of the total data volume in the network. The final 3%, averaging the last 300 m (328 yd) from the neighborhood's hubsite optical node to the final customer connection, are transported by 412,600 km (256,378 mi) of coaxial cables. In the early 2020s the Ziggo network consist of:

- The national main fiber network. This is a ring network with 2 national data centers and the fiber-optic segment trunk backbone.
- Regional Center (RC) The RC is a coupling point between the national main fiber network and a regional fiber network (also a ring network). There are 66 RCs.
- Local Center (LC) The LC is the coupling point between the regional fiber network and the local fiber network. There are 600 LCs.
- District Center (DC) The District or Neighborhood Center is a tapping point of the local fiber network and contains the two-way fiber to coaxial conversion hardware to the Group Amplifier (GA) (Caxial Group Amplifier). Ziggo manages 12,000 GAs as coaxial segment trunks.
- Each GA feeds a small number of Power Amplifiers (PA) (Coaxial Power Amplifiers). Ziggo manages 70,000 PAs.
- Behind the PAs we find the Multitap in streets and larger buildings, which distributes the signal from the PA to a group of Subscriber Takeover Points (STP) final customer connection points. A PA and a multitap are often combined in a street cabinet. Ziggo manages approximately 7,300,000 STPs.

== Cable television and radio ==
=== Technology ===
==== Television signal ====
===== DVB-C =====
The digital television signal is transmitted in the Digital Video Broadcasting-Cable (DVB-C) standard in 256-QAM modulation mode. According to measurements the bit rates of the offered digital television channels vary, and many television channels have a variable bit rate (VBR). The high-definition channels are encoded in H.264/MPEG-4 AVC and most standard-definition channels are encoded in MPEG-4. Only a part of the free-to-cable standard-definition channels are still encoded in MPEG-2. Customers can buy or rent a certified set-top box or Integrated Digital Television with embedded CA. Additionally customers can buy any television or set-top box with a DVB-C tuner for the free-to-cable basic subscription and optionally included by CI+ support with a Ziggo compatible conditional-access module for supplemental packages. As of 2015, Ziggo uses both the Nagravision and Irdeto conditional access system.

Cable television via DVB-C is a service with which Ziggo can distinguish itself, as DVB-C linear television distribution is not available in Ziggy's service area from competing all-fiber-optics providers, who opted for Internet Protocol television (IPTV) instead of DVB-C. Despite this, the phasing out and end of DVB-C is inevitable, due to Ziggo's intended future switch to more capable DOCSIS 4 cable internet technology.

===== 2024 partial DVB-C shutdown =====
Ziggo opted to start the phasing out of DVB-C cautiously. In July 2024 the DVB-C television distribution of the Hindi, Turkish, Arabic and Gay Lifestyle subscription packages ended. In June 2024 Ziggo offered these subscribers to switch to their Next Mini 4K rent decoder to continue watching these packages, if their decoding hardware is unsuitable for IPTV-only content delivery. Ziggo stated there is no plan yet to make more television channels IPTV-only after this partial DVB-C shutdown.

===== IPTV =====
In 2022 Internet Protocol television (IPTV) was introduced by Ziggo for delivery of television content over Internet Protocol (IP) networks. For this the Next Mini decoder was introduced as standard television receiver for customers that also have an internet subscription. This IPTV-only television decoder is similar to the Liberty Global Mini TV Box and makes all television content visible via IPTV. The Next Mini is connected with the Ziggo network via Ethernet wiring or wireless via Wi-Fi. The number of television channels and other IP-stream content that can be viewed with IPTV hardware over a coax cable or fibre-optic cable based high-speed internet connection within a household is virtually unlimited. Practically, the provider determines which television channels and other content IP-streams are forwarded or not. Speculation is circulating on the internet that Ziggo introduced IPTV to make it easier for customers of competing combined high-speed internet and IPTV services providers, to switch to Ziggo or that DVB-C will be switched off in the future. As of 2024, new Ziggo television customers will always receive a Next Mini IPTV-only television decoder and Ziggo introduced their first IPTV-only channels.

Television viewers with a high-speed internet connection can opt to no longer use their provider's loan decoder, but an app for the online platform. To view television content, a Ziggo TV App is available for customers that poses Apple TV or Android TV mediaplayers or Amazon Fire TV Sticks. In 2023 speculations appeared that Ziggo might be preparing to transfer the distribution of television content to IPTV at an unknown moment in the future. For viewers who do not like additional IPTV hardware devices and remote controls, apps for smart television platforms are under development. In June 2024 the apps for post 2019 Samsung Smart TVs with the Tizen operating system and LG smart TVs with the WebOS 5.0 or higher operating system were released. The development and implementation of online and smart TV platform apps could nix the additional hardware for customers that (can) use their internet subscription to view television content and can promote a future transition from DVB-C to IPTV.

Previously, Ziggo also offered an analogue television signal. Between 2018 and 2021, it gradually phased out the analogue signal.

==== Radio signal ====
The digital radio signal is transmitted in the DVB-C standard. For digital radio a 2-channel (stereo) MPEG-1 Audio Layer II encoded digital audio broadcasting signal at 48 kHz audio sampling rate is used. According to measurements the bit rates of the offered digital radio channels vary, and some radio channels have a variable bit rate (VBR). The used lossy audio format is designed to provide high quality at about 192 kbit/s and higher bit rates for stereo sound signals. A company spokesperson stated Ziggo passes the digital radio stations to its end users as provided by the radio channels and does not re-encode, change or edit these digital signals to avoid quality reduction. In May 2024 Ziggo introduced 2-channel (stereo) Advanced Audio Coding (AAC) at 160 kbit/s encoded digital radio transmissions on a limited scale. Compared to MPEG-1 Audio Layer II, the AAC audio coding format requires less bandwidth to achieve the same sound quality. Disadvantages of using AAC are its non-open and free format, and it is not supported by some (older and cheaper) receiving devices.

Previously, Ziggo also offered an analogue radio signal. Between February 2021 and March 2022 the analogue FM cable radio signal was gradually phased out. According to TVTotaal the analogue FM cable radio service was terminated because due to competitive pressure Ziggo needed the bandwidth to increase the upload speed of the internet service. According to VodafoneZiggo; "The freed-up bandwidth allows us to offer even more television and internet services, such as increasing image quality and adding apps." and "We continue to innovate and look ahead, so that our GigaNet (internet service) grows with the needs of our customers. The complete switch to digital radio is a crucial part of that." For customers who are not able to receive the digital radio signal, Ziggo up to 29 May 2022 offered a digital radio receiver for €50 as an alternative for analogue FM cable radio reception equipment.

=== Channels ===
Ziggo provides about 200 linear television channels and more than 100 linear radio channels, DVR service, video-on-demand content, catch-up TV from public television broadcasters and commercial television stations and interactive television. About 40 TV channels and 40 radio channels are transmitted in clear, while most premium channels are transmitted encrypted.

Basic service is called Kabel TV and consists of about 40 digital television channels, as well as 40 digital and analogue radio channels. It consists of all the major Dutch networks and some of the main networks of neighbouring countries. Additional TV and radio channels are available through "TV Standard", "Movies & Series XL" and premium packages. Every additional package comes with Xite Music which offers 40 additional radio channels, as well as interactive video on demand services.

On 4 July 2009 the Dutch public broadcaster NPO started simulcasting NPO 1, NPO 2, and NPO 3 in 1080i high-definition. These public HD channels are part of basic service.

As of 2022 Ziggo offers most television channels in 1080i or 720p HD format. Also including premium film and sport services such as Film1 HD, ESPN HD and Ziggo Sport Totaal HD. The rest are part of basic service. A few channels/programmes are (sometimes temporarily) offered in 1080p Full HD, 4K Ultra HD and if available in HLG or HDR color representation for a larger dynamic range.

=== Ziggo GO ===
Ziggo GO is an online television service (an over-the-top (OTT) media service) from Ziggo. The service allows users to watch live TV and on demand video content from a PC, laptop, tablet and mobile phone. It is also possible to stream live television on Chromecast and Apple TV. The service was introduced by UPC in 2012. It was named Horizon TV app or Horizon GO. The service was renamed by Ziggo GO on 9 November 2016.

From 2017 until 2021 - after the closing of HBO Netherlands and before the Netherlands launch of HBO Max, all HBO content was available on Ziggo GO.

Internet-only subscribers with Ziggo can officially purchase an additional subscription for the online television service Ziggo GO as a supplement when such a subscription is purchased via the internet site. Ziggo GO can be viewed throughout the Netherlands and all countries of the European Union by customers that poses Apple TV or Android TV mediaplayers or Amazon Fire TV Sticks.

Until 2023 the channels were distributed in 720p HD via Ziggo GO. For these channels, the compression technique Advanced Video Coding (H.264) is used. In April 2023 Ziggo started offering twelve channels in 1080p Full HD via Ziggo GO. For these channels, the compression technique High Efficiency Video Coding (H.265) is used. In comparison to H.264, H.265 offers from 25% to 50% better data compression at the same level of video quality, or substantially improved video quality at the same bit rate.

== Internet ==
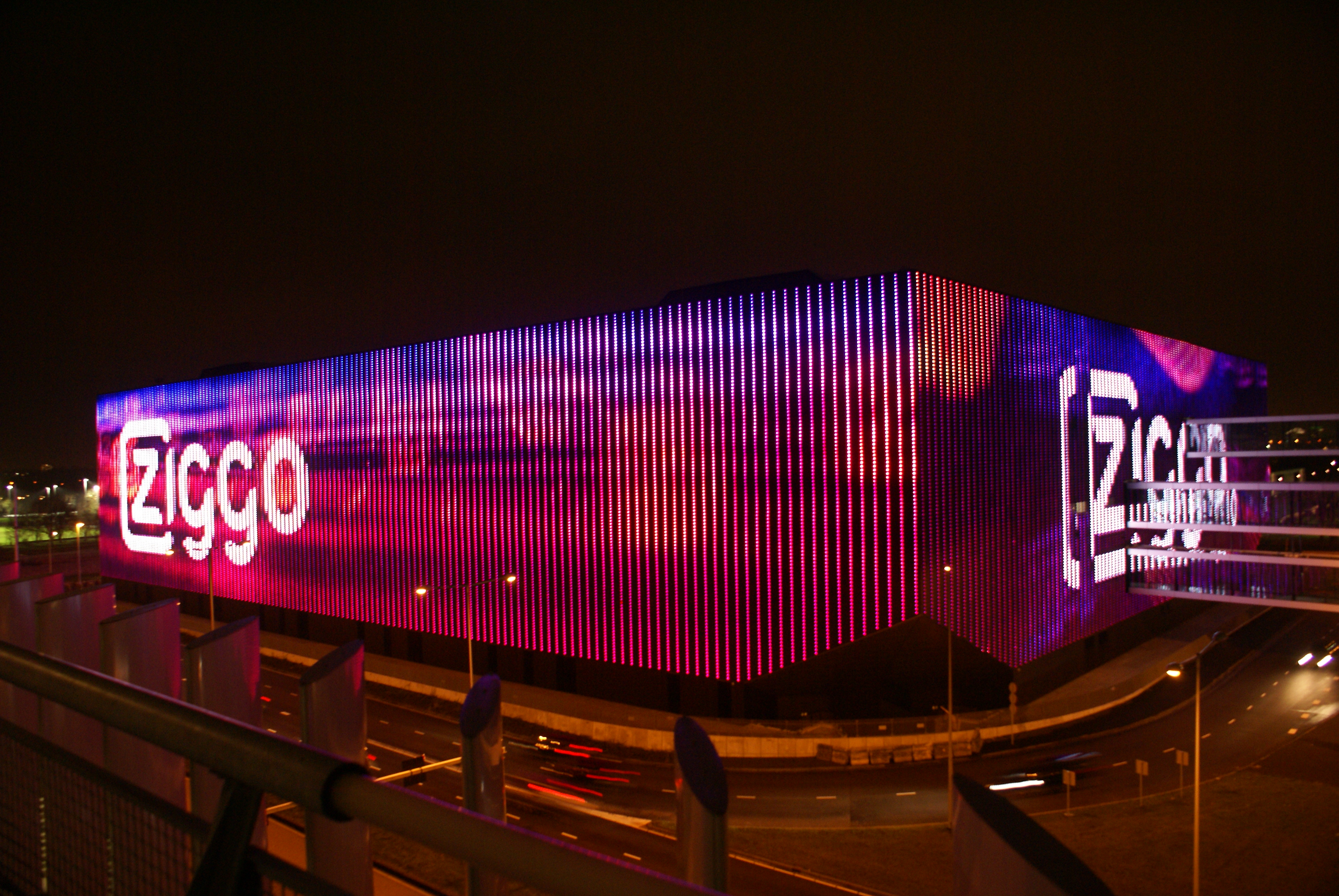
Ziggo Dome indoor arena in Amsterdam

In the Netherlands, there are three types of connections for landline broadband access internet available: (A)DSL, cable and fiber-optics. Almost every of the about 8.1 million Dutch households in 2022 had (A)DSL and cable internet access. Due to the almost universal cable availability and progressing roll-out of several fiber-to-the-home (FFTH) XGS-PON networks, it is expected (A)DSL will largely be phased out in the late 2020s. Four (Delta Fiber, KPN, Open Dutch Fiber/Odido, Ziggo) competing gigabit landline networks are regarded too many to be commercially economically viable. Mergers, acquisitions or mutual cooperation between these high-speed internet networks are expected at some point. At the end of 2022 5.34 million Dutch homes were passed by at least one FFTH network. Up to then the growth of FFTH was mainly due to the declining use of (A)DSL in providing internet. The combined cable and FFTH networks offered access to 1 Gbit/s download speeds for 97% of the Dutch residential addresses at the end of 2022.

In July 2023, the Netherlands Authority for Consumers and Markets (Autoriteit Consument & Markt (ACM)) regulator calculated 6.1 million homes were passed by at least one FFTH network and expected that almost all homes in the Netherlands will be connected to a FFTH network in 2026/2027. According to the ACM the two major Internet service providers (ISP's) KPN and Ziggo experience sufficient competition and in retail market areas where Ziggo competes with a FFTH network, Ziggo's market share has fallen to just under 40% and is expected to fall slightly further. In the fall of 2023 (symmetric) multigigabit down- and upload speeds up to 8 Gbit/s with XGS-PON technology for domestic subscribers were launched on all three main FFTH landline networks. To experience multigigabit internet on one computer, the home network – including the network card in the computer, any switches and all cabling – must be suitable for multigigabit speeds. It is expected that in a few years' time a minor update of the currently used XGS-PON technology will allow the internet speed of the all-fiber-optics providers to be increased to 25 Gbit/s. The Netherlands Authority for Consumers and Markets reported 7.13 million FFTH connections at the end of 2023, of which 2.64 million (37.3% coverage ratio) were used.

Due to competitive symmetric internet speed FFTH network offerings, Ziggo upgraded their asymmetric internet speeds offerings twice during 2023.

According to the quarterly Dutch Consumer Broadband research for broadband internet access by market researcher Telecompaper reported FTTH surpassed cable to become the most popular broadband technology in the Netherlands at the end of 2023. In all previous studies, the majority of the households opted for cable.

=== Technology ===
==== Hybrid fiber-coaxial DOCSIS data transfer ====
Ziggo offers cable broadband internet subscriptions, and their hybrid fiber-coaxial (fiber-to-the-neighborhood [FTTN]) network passed 7.3733 million of the about 8.1 million Dutch homes in 2022. For internet, Ziggo used and uses various versions of Data Over Cable Service Interface Specification (DOCSIS) technology. DOCSIS is used by many cable television operators to provide cable internet access over hybrid fiber-coaxial infrastructure. As Ziggo is a European operator, the used DOCSIS standards earlier than DOCSIS 3.1 were modified for use in Europe (EuroDOCSIS). As of December 2017, Ziggo had 3.240 million Internet access subscribers and 3,328 million subscribers in December 2022, which means that 45.1% of the homes passed paid Ziggo for internet access.

On 10 October 2019 Ziggo started the deployment of DOCSIS 3.1 in limited regions. This upgrade to DOCSIS 3.1 enabled download speeds up to 1 Gbit/s and is marketed as GigaNet. Since then EuroDOCSIS 3.1 was rolled out widely to offer asymmetric Internet access with asymmetric upload speeds of up to 100 Mbit/s. Ziggo completed the DOCSIS 3.1 roll-out operation in December 2022. At the same time, the company announced it is preparing for DOCSIS 4.0 (previously branded as DOCSIS 3.1 Full Duplex) tests in early 2023. Besides increased download speeds, DOCSIS 3.1 and especially DOCSIS 4.0 also technically enable significant increases in upload speeds. In 2022 Ziggo introduced the Sagemcom F3896LG-ZG/F@st 3896 DOCSIS 3.1 Full Duplex capable modem featuring a 2.5 Gbit/s Ethernet port that can deliver up to 5 Gbit/s download and 2 Gbit/s upload speeds.

==== Internal DOCSIS 4.0 testing ====
In May 2023 the first press releases emerged regarding an internal DOCSIS 4.0 test by Ziggo at their VodafoneZiggo TEC Campus in Amsterdam. The commencement of testing this DOCSIS technology version was announced in 2022. The first deployment of DOCSIS 4.0 in limited regions is not expected before 2024 or 2025, assuming by then sufficient DOCSIS 4.0 capable modems and other network components are available. Ziggo expects to start DOCSIS 4 field tests in 2024 and gradually achieve an asymmetric download speed of 5 Gbit/s in the further future.

It is not highly likely Ziggo will quickly roll out DOCSIS 4 over their full service area, as the coaxial segment frequency spectrum used increases from 1 to 1.2 GHz for Full Duplex (FDX) DOCSIS 4 or to 1.8 GHz for Extended Spectrum DOCSIS (ESD). For that, Ziggo must disable linear television distribution via DVB-C. The probably bigger challenge for delivering multi-gigabyte symmetrical internet speeds with DOCSIS 4 is the technical condition of the coaxial network. In large parts of the service area, the coaxial cables used between the street cabinets and the approximately 7,300,000 Subscriber Takeover Points (STP) final customer connection points are decades old. In some areas, these old cables have exceeded their maximum lifespan specifications. This has consequences for the services provided in the future. Coaxial cables that are no longer in optimal condition suffer from rapidly increasing attenuation above ~1 GHz. In October 2023 the first commercial DOCSIS 4 launch of an upgraded hybrid fiber-coaxial 1.2 GHz Full Duplex (FDX) network, offering symmetrical speeds up to 2 Gbit/s, was by Comcast/Xfinity in a selected area in the United States.

==== Small-scale introduction of fiber-to-the-home (FFTH) connections ====
Until early 2024, VodafoneZiggo has been reluctant to invest in upgrading the hybrid fiber-coaxial (fiber-to-the-neighborhood [FFTN]) network to a pure fiber-to-the-home (FFTH) network. Investing in DOCSIS 4.0 and possibly later DOCSIS upgrades costs less than going all-fiber-optics for the entire network. As in the early 2020s about 10% of Ziggo's total network length uses fiber-optical cables instead of coaxial cables, going all-fiber-optics will be a strategic investment to maintain sufficient ISP market share which seems to be postponed for the time being. In September 2023 the CEO of VodafoneZiggo co-owner Liberty Global said the company "feels good about DOCSIS 3.1 and 4.0" but added that it has options in the competitive Dutch market. Large corporate customers can be provided with all-fiber-optics to their business buildings by Ziggo.

Only on a small project scale, Ziggo offers fiber-to-the-home (FFTH) connections since 2021. These FTTH connections are based on a radio frequency over glass (RFoG) deep-fiber network design in which the coaxial portion of the hybrid fiber coax (HFC) network is replaced by a single-fiber passive optical network (PON). In the projects where Ziggo opts to extend the fiber-to-the-neighborhood (FFTN) into the customer's (new-build) home, significant additional construction costs like earthwork are avoided and a RFoG fiber to coax converter is still present. This ensures customers can continue to use their existing equipment. One can expect FTTH connections at larger post 2021 construction locations, with more than a hundred completely new homes to be built. The FFTH offered asymmetric internet services by Ziggo are identical to their non-FFTH asymmetric offerings.

===== Introduction of fiber-to-the-home (FFTH) connections on a municipal controlled network =====
In November 2023 Ziggo announced their approach for a planned switch from hybrid fiber-coaxial to a FFTH signal supply for the municipal cable network of Edam-Volendam, whilst holding on by RFoG signal converters at the Subscriber Takeover Points (STP) to DOCSIS and DVB-C technology. As of 2024 this municipal controlled all-fiber-optics FFTH network replaces the hybrid fiber-coaxial network, that eventually will be switched off. Multiple providers including KPN, Odido and Ziggo will mutually compete with their services on the new open network. Ziggo by exception will be offering symmetric up- and download speeds on this municipal network.

==== Joint venture with a commercial controlled fiber-to-the-home (FFTH) provider ====
In June 2025 Ziggo and fiber optics broadcast and internet services provider Delta announced a joint venture. In 2026 Ziggo will start to provide their broadcast and internet services on a non-local external commercial controlled fiber optics network. However, the networks of these providerw have no significant served areas overlap.

== Telephony ==
As of December 2017, Ziggo has 2.551 million subscribers to their land-line telephone services and 2.065 million subscribers in December 2022. It also offered a virtual mobile phone service. Ziggo Mobile stopped offering new mobile subscriptions in April 2017, and existing mobile customers were migrated to Vodafone Netherlands in September 2017.

== Triple play ==
As of December 2017, 64.7% of subscribers have a triple play subscription: a cable television, internet and telephone service bundle.

== Customers and business performance ==
At the end of 2020, the company provided at least one service to more than 3,836,300 households: 3,831,300 households with television, 3,363,500 households with an internet connection and 2,272,800 households with telephony. It then had 5,189,800 mobile subscribers (4,757,100 postpaid and 432,700 prepaid). In 2023, there were about 8,300,000 households in the Netherlands.

Year	Homes passed	Fixed services customers	Mobile services customers	Fixed coverage ratio	Revenue	Operating income
2014	6,982,700	4,291,600	—	61.5%	€2,534.800,000	€198,400,000
2015	7,023,200	4,090,400	—	58.2%	€2,472,700,000	€108,800,000
2016	7,089,500	3,978,600	—	56.1%	€4,172,900,000	€301,000,000
2017	7,140,000	3,920,000	4,800,000	54.9%	€4,091,100,000	€192,600,000
2018	7,200,000	3,900,000	4,960,000	54.2%	€3,895,000,000	€110,600,000
2019	7,250,000	3,880,000	5,065,000	53.5%	€3,937,000,000	€106,400,000
2020	7,300,000	3,836,300	5,189,800	52.6%	€4,000,000,000	€248,600,000
2021	7,328,000	3,738,800	5,365,400	51.0%	€4,076,900,000	€296,900,000
2022	7,373,300	3,676,200	5,527,600	49.9%	€4,065,600,000	€373,900,000
2023	7,516,600	3,553,000	5,642,000	47.3%	€4,114,700,000	€-471.500,000

To prevent a further decline in the fixed coverage ratio (46.2% at the end of the first quarter of 2024), Ziggo's business challenge is the price policy of their subscription offerings. Competing all-fiber-optics providers do provide faster internet for the same or sometimes a lower price. With DVB-C and a better television platform, Ziggo remains ahead of its competitors with linear television content. However, the media consumption of the Dutch households is changing so quickly towards online that this advantage is losing relevance.

== See also ==
- Digital television in the Netherlands
- Internet in the Netherlands
- List of cable companies in the Netherlands
- Television in the Netherlands
- VodafoneZiggo
- Vodafone Netherlands
- XMO
- Ziggo Dome
- Ziggo Sport
