= Schizas =

Schizas is a surname. Notable people with the surname include:

- Anastasios Schizas (born 1977), Greek water polo player
- Lou Schizas, Canadian financial analyst
- Madeline Schizas (born 2003), Canadian figure skater
- Stavros Schizas (born 1989), Greek basketball player
