= Aneta Bogdan =

Romanian branding, corporate identity and marketing consultant

Aneta Bogdan is a Romanian branding, corporate identity and marketing consultant. She is co-founder and managing partner of brand and design company Brandient, which operates from Bucharest and Singapore. She is considered a pioneer in the branding discipline in Romania and was included in the top 100 "Most Powerful Business Women in Romania" in 2012, as well as in other relevant business publications, such as "Who’s Who in Business Romania 2018", made by Ziarul Financiar.

Bogdan consults leading entrepreneurs and businesses in Eastern Europe and Southeast Asia, including Bitdefender, eMAG, Dedeman, Transavia, Banca Transilvania as well as multinational businesses such as YTL Corporation, Vodafone, ING Bank, Heineken and Renault. She was the advisor for the rebranding of several nation brands, such as sports organisations Romanian Olympic and Sports Committee, Romanian Rugby Federation, media organisations National Romanian Television and Radiocom, and the Romanian national bank CEC Bank, as well as for the creation of the Team Romania brand and the first visual identity for the Romania National Football Team.

Bogdan is a Chartered Marketer, a Fellow of The Chartered Institute of Marketing (FCIM) and holds an MBA from the Open University Business School (UK). She is also a trainer and brand speaker, and the author of Branding on the Eastern Front.

== Biography ==
Bogdan graduated from the Bucharest Academy of Economic Studies (ASE) in 1984, during the last decade of communism. Her first job was in a company producing and exporting industrial goods. Her career unfolded exclusively in marketing and branding. After a few jobs in the marketing management of local firms, she was hired in 1997 by the new telecom player Mobifon, operating the Connex brand (owned at the time by Telesystems International Wireless and AirTouch Canada). She was promoted as Marketing Communications Director, contributing to building the most valuable Romanian brand at the time – Connex was subsequently acquired by Vodafone in 2005 for EUR 2.6 billion.

Since 1998, Bogdan has been a member of The Chartered Institute of Marketing (CIM), where she received in 2001 the Chartered Marketer qualification. Since 2011, she is a Fellow of The Chartered Institute of Marketing (FCIM). In 2002 she received her post-graduate degree MBA (Master of Business Administration) from Open University Business School (UK). In the same year, she left Connex to co-found the brand strategy and design company Brandient, together with designer Cristian Kit Paul and finance professional Mihai Bogdan.

Bogdan is a frequent keynote speaker on branding and an awarded professional. She has been invited in the jury of global design competitions.

Bogdan is author of the book Branding on the Eastern Front (Romanian edition published in 2010, international edition published in 2018).

She has talked about improving the Romanian "brand" in the world and is active in several Romanian social causes.

== Work ==
Brandient

Founded in 2002 in Bucharest, Romania, Brandient is a consultancy in branding and design. In 2012, Brandient extended its activity in Southeast Asia, and opened an office in Singapore. Bogdan is Managing Partner of Brandient worldwide. Brandient has received many industry awards including Red Dot, Graphis, Rebrand 100, Pentawards, Transform etc., and was included in the Rebrand Hall of Fame in 2015. Through Brandient, Bogdan was responsible for the creation of over 100 new brands (a selection of which was published in the book Brandient 101 in 2010) and was the advisor for a quarter of the most valuable 50 Romanian brands (as per the report released by the global consulting firm Brand Finance).

Other projects

In 2003, Bogdan invited Wally Olins for the first time in Romania, launching the debate on the nation's branding at the conference BrandRo in Bucharest. Later in 2010, Olins wrote the foreword for her book Branding on the Eastern Front. In 2009, Bogdan and Olins led the consortium Brandient-Saffron at the tender for pitching for the tourism brand of Romania, organised by the Ministry of Development and Tourism.

In 2011, Bogdan was selected as a frontrunner at the tender for create the "Made in Bhutan" brand, organised by the Ministry of Economy from Bhutan, under the aegis of the United Nations Development Programme (UNDP).

== Books ==
Bogdan wrote the best-seller book Branding on the Eastern Front, with the first Romanian edition published in 2010 and sold out in 3 months, followed by the 2nd edition in 2011. The book is written after 20 years of practice in marketing, communication and branding, and its topic is "about reputation, against the tide" – as its subtitle reads – with focus on the pioneering of the branding approach on emergent markets in Eastern Europe. The book is referenced in academic research and serves as bibliography for the branding discipline at national universities. The international edition in English was published in 2018.

== See also ==
- Kevin Lane Keller
