= Karla Stephens-Tolstoy =

Canadian businesswoman (born 1969)

Karla D. Stephens-Tolstoy (Russian: Толста́я, romanized: Tolstaya; born December 30, 1969) is the co-founder and CEO of Stand Up Speak Up Apparel and the former CEO of Vodafone Czech Republic (formerly Oskar Mobil a.s.).

== Early life ==
Stephens was born in Winnipeg, Manitoba. Her father, Antony "Tony" Stephens served as president of Morguard Investments Ltd., Morguard Investments and Morguard Financial and was President of the Lake of the Woods Water Sustainability Foundation since its founding in 2004. Her mother, Nancy Stephens was the daughter of prominent Manitoban businessman, Jack Bulman, and sister of W. John A. Bulman; she was a homemaker. Stephens was the youngest of three daughters. The family relocated to metro Toronto in 1972 and the Stephens sisters attended Richview Collegiate Institute in Etobicoke. Following graduation, Stephens pursued her degree at McMaster University in Hamilton, majoring in English Literature and later earned a postgraduate diploma in Asian Marketing at Humber College in Toronto.

== Career ==
=== Early career ===
Following graduation from McMaster University in 1992, Stephens created a new television magazine show to Rogers TV called ChitChat. Also in 1992 she joined Bell Mobility as a Customer Care Rep and was promoted to Sales Planner.

=== Mobile Communications ===
In 1995 Stephens joined Toronto-based Telesystems International Wireless (TIW) and her first position was with Unicom in China as Director of Sales & Marketing where the company launched the first GSM operator in the Changsha region. Due to a mandate prohibiting foreign ownership of telecommunications companies, TIW was forced to sell the company back to the Chinese government and depart the region. Within a year TIW's Connex was awarded a GSM license in Romania and Stephens went on to serve as Vice President of Sales & Marketing for Connex (Mobifon S.A.) in Bucharest, Romania. In 1999 she became the Chief Commercial Officer with Oskar Mobil a.s. and helped build the third mobile telcom operator in the Czech Republic. In 2002 she was promoted to Chief Operating Officer. In 2005 Oskar was bid on by Vodafone and Stephens became CEO of Vodafone. Stephens created and executive produced the nighttime talk show Vodopád (Waterfall), airing weekly on TV Prima with Czech actor Tomáš Hanák in the host's seat. The show was considered a light and lively addition to TV Prima’s program schedule.

=== Tokii ===
In 2008, Stephens began working on Tokii, a relationship management platform headquartered in Oakville, Ontario in Canada. The program launched its public beta on March 11, 2011. The focus of this venture later expanded to be a quiz-based app with over 700 quizzes on a variety of self-help and relationship topics.

=== Stand Up Speak Up ===
In 2015, Stephens and her teen son, Zachary started the online store, podcast and blog Stand Up Speak Up, as a company devoted to using fashion to start conversations about topics that the pair did not feel were getting enough attention from mainstream media.

Stand Up Speak Up Podcast

The Stand Up Speak Up Podcast started in 2016 as a society and culture podcast that delves into the lives of people whose stories might not otherwise be brought to light. This podcast is known for its elements of true crime investigation, examining systems like foster care, criminal justice and mental health treatment, and for the real-life voices that are featured in each episode. Stand Up Speak Up gained significant recognition for its series on the disappearance of London, Ontario woman Shelley Desrochers, who hasn't been seen since January 2016.

== Personal life ==
Stephens married Alexander Tolstoy while in Prague and they have one son, Zachary Tolstoy. Stephens serves on the Advisory Council for Ted Rogers School of Management at Toronto Metropolitan University. Stephens' hobbies include visiting Lake of the Woods in Ontario and volunteers doing dog therapy with her great dane.

== Honors and awards ==
Computer World's Top 100 Companies (2005)

Rhodos Best Image Award – Telcom (2003, 2004, 2005)

Stevie Award for Women Entrepreneurs 2005

Design Effectiveness Awards (UK) 2005

Metro Golden Stone 2004, 2005

League of American Communications Professionals (LACP) Vision Awards (USA) 2001, 2003, 2004

World Communication Awards (UK) 2001, 2002, 2003, 2005
