= List of people from Oakville, Ontario =

This is a list of notable people from or living in Oakville, Ontario in alphabetical order.

== A ==
- Susan Aglukark, Inuk singer
- Damon Allen, quarterback, CFL's Toronto Argonauts
- Anita Anand, member of Parliament
- Zenon Andrusyshyn, former CFL's Toronto Argonauts placekicker
- Anjulie, pop singer
- Jason Arakgi, Canadian Football League player
- Peter Armstrong, CBC journalist

== B ==
- Bryan Baeumler, host of Disaster DIY
- Donovan Bailey, Olympic gold medalist and former world record holder in the 100 metres
- Alison Baird, children's fantasy author
- Tim Bakker, CFL player
- Jeff Batchelor, snowboarder
- Lindy Booth, actress
- Evan Bouchard, ice hockey player
- Erika Brown, curler
- Alexandra Bugailiskis, retired Canadian diplomat
- Desmond T. Burke, Canada Sports Hall of Fame member; winner of the 1924 King's Prize
- Molly Burke, blind YouTuber and motivational speaker

== C ==
- Larry Cain, Olympic gold medalist in men's canoe
- Eric Cairns, Pittsburgh Penguins defenceman
- Amice Calverley, English-born Canadian Egyptologist and composer
- Jamie Campbell, Rogers Sportsnet baseball analyst
- Dillon Casey, actor
- Ivan Chiriaev, Russian basketball player
- Brock Chisholm, first director general of the World Health Organization
- William Chisholm, founder of the town of Oakville
- Eric Chong, chef and winner of MasterChef Canada season 1
- Steve Christie, former NFL placekicker
- Michael "Pinball" Clemons, player and coach, CFL's Toronto Argonauts
- Tom Cochrane, musician
- Reggie Cornell, horse racing trainer
- Alex Crepinsek, professional lacrosse player with the Georgia Swarm of the National Lacrosse League (NLL)
- Ian Crichton, musician, lead guitarist of Saga
- Katie Crown, voice actress and television writer

== D ==
- Adam DiMarco, actor
- Nathan Dossantos, soccer player
- Arlene Duncan, actor

== F ==
- Joel Feeney, singer and songwriter
- Tom Fergus, former NHLer
- Dan Ferrone, CFL's Toronto Argonauts
- J.D. Fortune, musician and former frontman of INXS
- Matt Foy, NHL player

== G ==
- Sam Gagner, NHL player
- Isaiah George, NHL player
- Alice Glass, former frontwoman of the electronic band Crystal Castles
- Cody Goloubef, NHL player
- Adam Graves, former NHLer

== H ==
- Hagood Hardy, musician
- Vic Hadfield, former NHL player
- Noelle Henning, soccer player
- James Hinchcliffe, Indycar racer
- Lauren Holly, actress
- Marieve Herington, actress and singer

== I ==
- Malcolm Ingram, award-winning filmmaker, Small Town Gay Bar

== J ==
- Daniel Jebbison, soccer player
- Brianne Jenner (born 1991), Olympic gold and silver medalist in ice hockey, forward and captain for the Ottawa Charge, and member of the Canada women's national ice hockey team

== K ==
- Bob Kelly, former NHL player
- Jason Kenney, premier of Alberta, member of Parliament for Calgary Southeast
- Kristin O'Neill, PWHL Player, San Jose Sea Lions

== L ==
- Kara Lang, former Canadian international soccer player and current TV analyst
- Scott Laughton, NHL player
- Ray Lawson, former lieutenant governor of Ontario
- Granville Liggins, former Canadian Football League player
- Matt Luff, NHL player for the Los Angeles Kings
- Tabitha Lupien, dancer and actress

== M ==
- Carson MacCormac, actor
- Kimbal Mackenzie, basketball coach
- Ron MacLean, host of Hockey Night in Canada
- Tony Mandarich, former NFL offensive lineman
- Steve Mason, goalie, Philadelphia Flyers
- Miriam McDonald, Degrassi: The Next Generation actress
- Anne-Marie Mediwake, Global TV news anchor
- Alice Merton, singer-songwriter
- Michael Misa, NHL player, San Jose Sharks
- John Mitchell, NHL player, Toronto Maple Leafs
- Eric Monkman, academic and television personality
- Sean Morley, WWE wrestler

== N ==
- Ryland New, businessman, Canadian Horse Racing Hall of Fame
- Briar Nolet, dancer and actress

== P ==
- Stuart Percy, Pittsburgh Penguins defenceman
- Phil Pritchard (b. 1960 or 1961), keeper of the Stanley Cup
- Sandra Post, former LPGA golfer

== R ==
- Pamela Rabe, actor
- Jasmine Richards, actor
- Brian J. Robinson, musician

== S ==
- Michael Schade, operatic tenor
- Madeline Schizas, figure skater, represented Team Canada at the 2022 Winter Olympics
- Shawn Stasiak, WWE wrestler
- Karla Stephens-Tolstoy, CEO of Tokii; former CEO of Vodafone CZ
- Diana Swain, CBC Television journalist
- Andrew Sznajder (born 1967), English-born Canadian tennis player

== T ==
- John Tavares, NHL Player, Toronto Maple Leafs
- Michael Therriault, actor
- Shane Told, musician, lead singer of Silverstein

== V ==
- Adam van Koeverden, Olympic gold medalist, kayak singles 500
- Mike Vanderjagt, NFL kicker

== W ==
- Rick Wamsley, former NHLer
- Amalia Williamson, actress
- Niamh Wilson, actress
- Scott Wilson, forward, Pittsburgh Penguins

== X ==
- Allie X, singer-songwriter

== Z ==
- Rob Zamuner, former NHL player
