= Amice Calverley =

Canadian egyptologist (1896–1959)

Amice Mary Calverley
- Born: April 9, 1896; London, England
- Died: April 10, 1959 (aged 63); Toronto, Canada
- Occupations: Egyptologist, Composer

Amice Calverley (9 April 1896 – 10 April 1959) was an English-born Canadian Egyptologist who was instrumental to the recording and publication of the decoration in the temple of King Sethos I at Abydos. During and after World War II she engaged in humanitarian work, including in Crete where she nursed at the front and filmed the conflict. She then used her filming as publicity to seek assistance for those disabled as a result of the conflict. She was also a music composer, with many works in chamber music and orchestral music, such as the String Quartet in F minor and the Variations on a Harmonic Theme.

== Early life ==
Amice Mary Calverley was born in London, England on 9 April 1896. Her family first moved to South Africa, then on to Canada. She studied music and earned some money from her needlework, before going to New York where she worked as a mannequin and dress-designer at Wanamaker's Store. After gaining a scholarship in 1922 to study at the Royal College of Music she returned to England.

In 1926 she started to teach herself drawing for archaeology, during which process she upset a bottle of ink over an 'immemorial sherd' at the British Museum, and became involved with the Egyptian Exploration Society in 1927.

== Achievements in Egyptology ==
In 1928, Amice Calverley was engaged by the Society to work as part of a project to record the decoration in the temple of King Sethos I at Abydos.

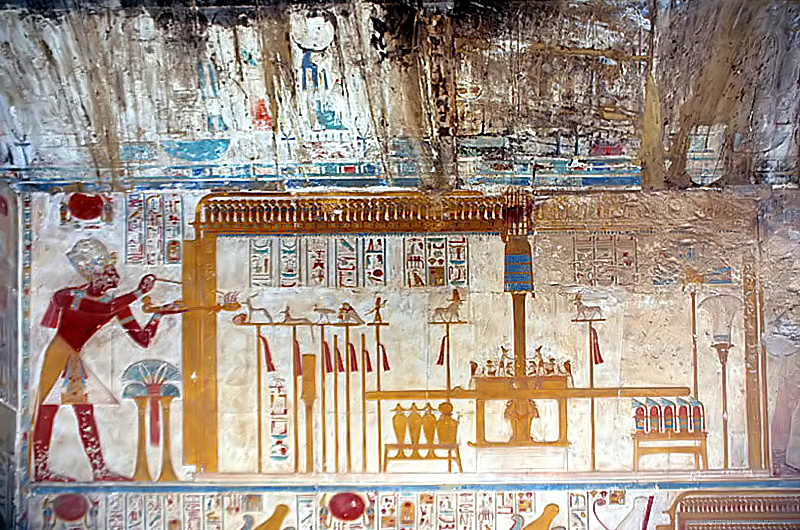
Example of a relief in Temple Chapel of Osiris, Temple of Seti I, Abydos, Egypt

Although the project was initially conceived as a "purely photographic publication", the quality of Calverley's draughtsmanship was instrumental in allowing a more ambitious publication to be realised. This was because the high standards Calverley attained in portraying the sculptures in the temple meant that it would look incongruous to simply put her drawings with schematic representations of the hieroglyphic inscriptions, and the project evolved into a more ambitious scheme - which would also require more time.

During the winter of 1928–9, Calverley was working singlehandedly to draw and photograph the reliefs when John D. Rockefeller Jr. visited. He was so impressed by her work and by the temple reliefs that he co-sponsored the project with the Oriental Institute of the University of Chicago.

The resulting work was published in four volumes:

- The Temple of King Sethos I at Abydos, Volume I: The Chapels of Osiris, Isis and Horus Copied by Amice M. Calverley, with the assistance of Myrtle F. Broome, and edited by Alan H. Gardiner, 1933.
- The Temple of King Sethos I at Abydos, Volume II: The Chapels of Amen-Rē', Rē'-Ḥarakhti, Ptaḥ, and King Sethos Copied by Amice M. Calverley, with the assistance of Myrtle F. Broome, and edited by Alan H. Gardiner, 1935.
- The Temple of King Sethos I at Abydos, Volume III: The Osiris Complex Copied by Amice M. Calverley, with the assistance of Myrtle F. Broome, and edited by Alan H. Gardiner, 1938.
- The Temple of King Sethos I at Abydos, Volume IV: The Second Hypostyle Hall Copied by Amice M. Calverley, with the assistance of Myrtle F. Broome, and edited by Alan H. Gardiner, 1958.

The photographic archive produced by Calverley became an irreplaceable resource for studying the temple, and was used by the Egypt Exploration Society in its further work on the temple in 1979–1983.

After working in Abydos, she went to Austria in 1933, where she wrote a string quartet in F Minor.

== War and post-war humanitarian work ==
When World War II started, she became a driver for the Invalid Children's Aid Association during the evacuation scheme in the UK, before returning to Canada due to family illness. Coming back to England in 1941, she was sent briefly to Cairo by the Ministry of Information to be attached to the propaganda unit of the British Embassy. She returned to the UK and joined the Air Force and in 1944 became Civilian Relief worker, Mediterranean, with U.N.R.R.A.

In 1947 she returned to Abydos, where there was an outbreak of cholera, and obtained vaccines from Chicago to inoculate local villagers and British and US personnel in Upper Egypt. She then went on to Crete in 1949 where she filmed the conflict, including visiting Epirus with the Commando Brigade of Colonel Papageorgopoulos and filming the battle of Grammos. She also nursed soldiers at the front.

She later contacted many of the men she had nursed and, shocked by the lack of after-care, worked out a scheme for training disabled people. In 1950 her film of the conflict was shown at the Central Office of Information, although the funds for the wounded that she hoped it would raise never materialized.

Caverley returned to Canada and continued to work on volumes V and VI of the Abydos material before her death on 10 April 1959. She resided in Oakville, Ontario, where her family had settled after emigrating from England when Calverley was 16.

== See also ==
- List of people from Oakville, Ontario
- Canadian classical music
- List of Canadian composers
- Chronological list of Canadian classical composers
