= Myrtle Broome =

British Egyptologist and artist

Myrtle Florence Broome
- Self portrait
- Born: 22 February 1888; Muswell Hill, London, England
- Died: 27 January 1978 (aged 89); Bushey, England
- Education: University College London
- Known for: Epigraphy, illustrations of Egyptian villages
- Notable work: Recording the Temple of Sethos I at Abydos in Egypt

Myrtle Florence Broome (22 February 1888 – 27 January 1978) was a British Egyptologist and artist known for her illustrated work with Amice Calverley on the Temple of Seti I at Abydos in Egypt and her paintings of Egyptian village life in the 1920s and 1930s.

== Early life and education ==
Myrtle Florence Broome was born on 22 February 1888 in Muswell Hill, London, England to Eleanor Slater and Washington Herbert Broome. She received her art training at a school in Bushey founded by Sir Hubert von Herkomer. From 1911 to 1913 she attended University College London and obtained a Certificate in Egyptology. Her teachers were Sir Flinders Petrie and Margaret Murray.

== Epigraphy career in Egypt ==
In 1927, Broome was invited to participate in a project being conducted in Egypt by the British School of Archeology. The participants, including archeologist Olga Tufnell, copied tomb inscriptions at Qua-El-Kebi, Egypt.

In 1929, Broome returned to Egypt to work as an artist with Canadian epigrapher Amice Calverley. Calverley had been hired by the Egypt Exploration Society in 1927 to copy the wall scenes in the Temple of Seti I, c. 1300 BC at Abydos. In the winter of 1928, a visit to Abydos by Mr. and Mrs. John D. Rockefeller Jr. changed the scope of the work being done. Rockefeller was so impressed with the painted reliefs and Calverley's photography like reproductions, that he decided to finance the entire project. As a patron of the Oriental Institute at the University of Chicago, he was also responsible for the Oriental Institute joining efforts on the temple endeavor with the Egypt Exploration Society.

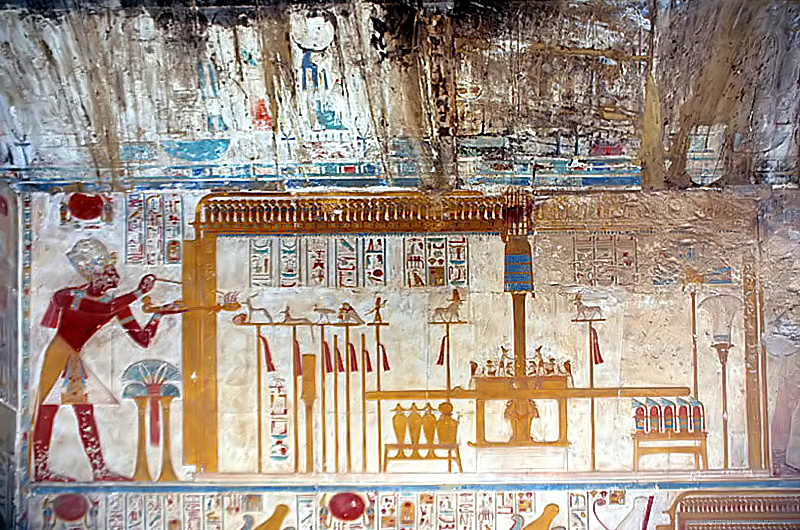
Example of a relief in Temple Chapel of Osiris, Temple of Seti I, Abydos, Egypt

Calverley was appointed director of the Temple project. With the increased funds, Broome was hired as Calverley's assistant in 1929. During eight seasons at the Temple, the two women were responsible for all the paintings and replications, with the help of a small staff of artists. Besides using large photographs to record the reliefs, the artists penciled over lines and inscriptions for a completely accurate rendering.

Broome and Calverley also used watercolor paintings to provide color to the reproductions, because only black and white photography was available at the time. The result of that effort is four volumes with coloured plates published by the University of Chicago between 1933 and 1958.

The artists lived together in a mudbrick house near the temple with two local servants. Broome and Calverley were actively involved in the life of the village, participating in feasts and ceremonies and often providing medical assistance to the villagers. The two women traveled together throughout Egypt, taking trains and often driving across the desert in a Jowett car they named Joey; Broome's impressions from that time are noted in letters and illustrations that were sent to her parents.

Broome retired from Egyptology in 1937 and returned to England due to her father's illness. She later painted a number of watercolours of Egyptian villages and the surrounding landscape. Over seventy of her paintings are on permanent exhibit at the Bushey Museum in Bushey, England. Broome's letters and papers are at the Griffith Institute in Oxford, England.

== Design and craft career in England ==
Broome's father, Washington Herbert Broome was a music and book publisher. He was a contemporary of William Morris, an influential designer in the British Arts and Crafts movement. W. Broome worked with Morris at the Kelmscott Press before establishing The Old Bourne Press with James Guthrie. In 1907, W. Broome built a house in Bushey that is now listed as a historically interesting building with Historic England. The Broome house "Avalon" was designed and built in the late Arts and Crafts Style. Myrtle Broome created painted panels and decorations throughout the house. She is also mentioned as being a designer and a craft worker, who designed for Liberty.

Avalon is also listed as the home of Myrtle and Washington Broomes' business – "Designers and Workers in Metal and Enamel". Historic England describes the house as being "of special interest as a building created for a designer and craftsman of the Arts and Crafts movement, containing a rich variety of decorative elements of the period designed by Broome and his daughter."

== Selected bibliography ==
- Calverley, Amice M. and Myrtle F. Broome 1933. The temple of king Sethos I at Abydos, Volume I: the chapels of Osiris, Isis and Horus. London; Chicago: Egypt Exploration Society; University of Chicago Press.
- Calverley, Amice M. and Myrtle F. Broome 1935. The temple of king Sethos I at Abydos, Volume II: the chapels of Amen-Rē', Rē'-Ḥarakhti, Ptaḥ, and King Sethos. London; Chicago: Egypt Exploration Society; University of Chicago Press.
- Calverley, Amice M. and Myrtle F. Broome 1938. The temple of king Sethos I at Abydos, Volume III: the Osiris complex. London; Chicago: Egypt Exploration Society; University of Chicago Press.
- Calverley, Amice M. and Myrtle F. Broome 1958. The temple of King Sethos I at Abydos, Volume IV: the second hypostyle hall. London; Chicago: Egypt Exploration Society; University of Chicago Press.
