= Vodafone Czech Republic =

Telecommunications company in the Czech Republic

Vodafone Czech Republic a.s.

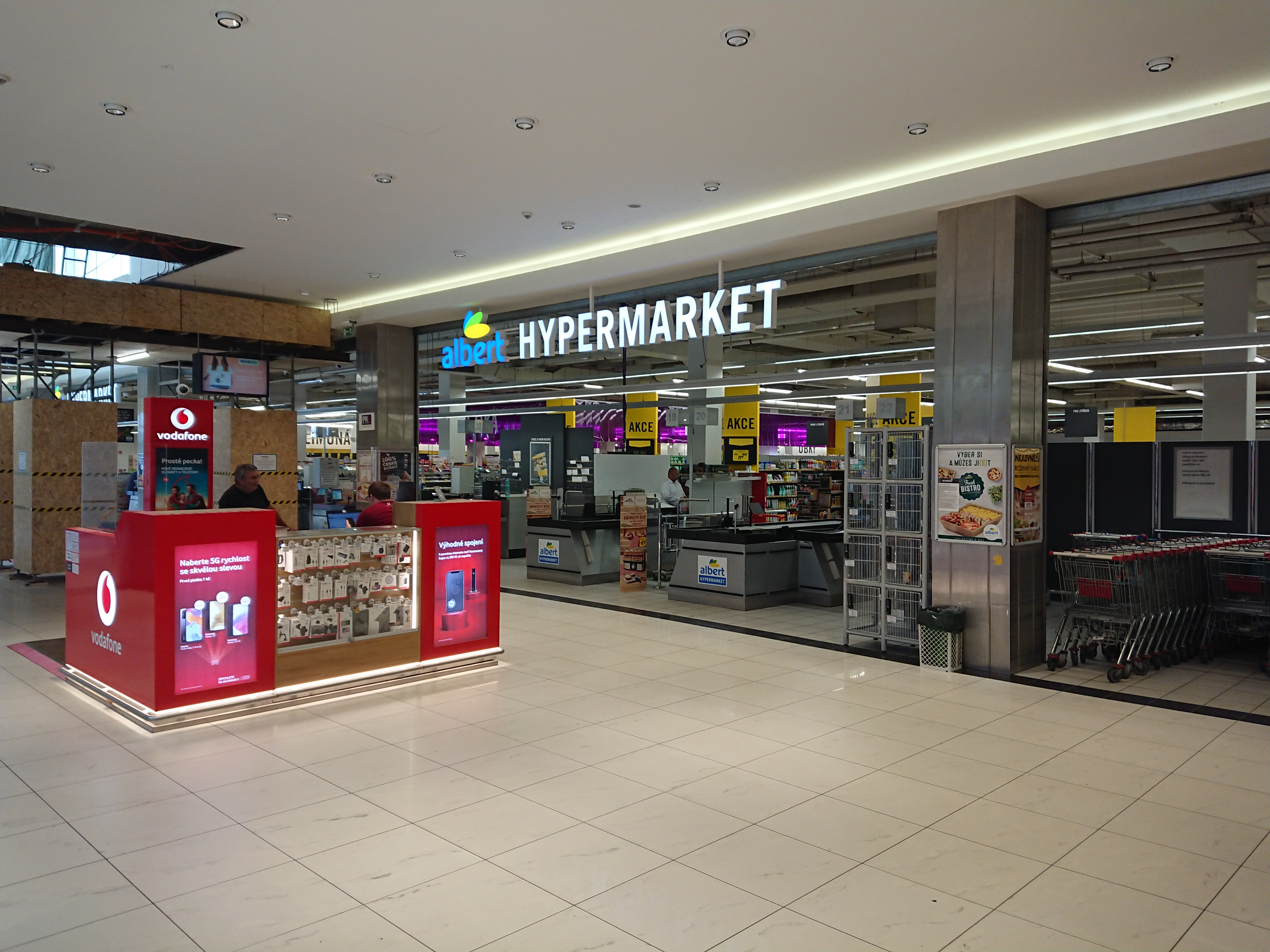
- Vodafone Czech Republic ship
- Formerly: Český Mobil a.s. (1999–2004); Oskar Mobil a.s. (2004–2006)
- Company type: Private
- Industry: Telecommunications
- Founded: August 13, 1999; 26 years ago
- Founder: TIW; IPB; Priority Telecom
- Headquarters: Prague, Czech Republic
- Area served: Czech Republic
- Key people: Violeta Luca (CEO)
- Products: Mobile and Fixed telephony
- Revenue: 19,811,000,000 Czech koruna (2022)
- Operating income: 1,924,000,000 Czech koruna (2022)
- Net income: 1,284,000,000 Czech koruna (2022)
- Total assets: 30,531,000,000 Czech koruna (2022)
- Owner: Vodafone Europe (100%)
- Number of employees: 2,411 (2022)
- Parent: Vodafone Group Plc
- Website: vodafone.cz

Vodafone Czech Republic a.s. is a Czech telecommunications company, owned by Vodafone Group. It is among the largest Czech companies by revenue.

It was established as Český Mobil in 1999, when the government of Miloš Zeman granted it a free license to operate the third mobile GSM network. The company was renamed in September 2004 to Oskar Mobil. In 2005 the international company Vodafone became the sole shareholder, which in November 2005, approved the most recent change in the company name.

Czech Vodafone currently has over 3 million customers. The director is Petr Dvořák since February 2018.

== History ==
In September 1999, an evaluation of the tender for the third license to operate telecommunications services in the GSM 1800 MHz band was conducted. Of the four registered bidders (Český Mobil, Orange, CrysTel, Vlna+) the best to meet the requirements of the tender were Český Mobil (148 points out of 150 possible) and Orange (132 points out of 150).

When comparing the experience with the operation of networks in the 1800 MHz (100% versus 0%) and the number of users (3.5 million versus 456 thousand), Orange prevailed, while Canadian Telesystems International Wireless (TIW, the majority shareholder of Český Mobil) had the difference from its rival having operated a mobile network in Romania (i.e. had experience with the operation of the network in an Eastern European country) and offered its network three months from the completion of the tender, i.e. during the scheduled completion of the tender at the end of September 1999, it should be running a network by Český Mobil by the end of December 1999. Orange offered to launch its network in early March 2000. The tender was won by Český Mobil.

On October 8, 1999, Český Mobil had its contract. It included a clause to run the network within three months: Český Mobil agrees to commence the provision of mobile telecommunications services and operation of telecommunications equipment within 3 months from the granting of credentials to cover approximately 37% of the population, assuming the availability of technical interconnection with SPT TELECOM, a.s. The original plan was to launch the network by Christmas 1999, but was dismissed from the mouth of the company's spokesperson about two months after signing the contract (November 1999) that the network would be operational by the deadline specified in the contract with the Ministry of Transport and Communications - the 8th of January 2000, but only for pilot testing. Officially, the commercial operation of the network Oskar wasn't started until March 1, 2000.

In 2001, in cooperation with Ericsson and the Czech Technical University it opened a Research and Development Center. Between 2001 and 2002, Oskar won 5 nominations for the prestigious World Communication Award for the best mobile operator. It closed its partnership with the world's mobile Vodafone family in 2005 and a year later of Oskar Mobil became Vodafone Czech Republic. Within a few months, there was a complete rebranding and Oskar Vodafone later became Vodafone. In 2007, Vodafone OneNet was launched offering companies converged mobile and fixed voice and data services including Internet access. As the first operator to do so, it started to offer services for free in exchange for viewing the ad on your mobile phone.

In the following years they began the construction of a 3G network and at the end of 2012 already covered 73.2% of the population. In the same year, Vodafone was the first operator to bring per-second billing and the first tablet under its own brand. The year 2013 was marked by unlimited tariffs, the test LTE network and cooperation with virtual operators.

== The Vodafone network ==
Commercial operation of the network was launched in March 2000. The Vodafone network currently covers 99.1% of the population. With the launch of EDGE, Vodafone introduced unlimited data services in 2005. The operation of its 3G network was launched in 2009. It launched LTE 4 years later for the first time. Vodafone is different from other operators in that they want LTE networks to cover mainly rural areas. By the end of 2014, it plans to cover 93% of the population.

== Virtual operators in the Vodafone network ==
On December 2, 2013, Vodafone launched its own virtual operator Oskarta, whose name follows its earlier service. It is a prepaid card that is already characterized by cheap calls. The Vodafone network currently comprises 23 virtual operators. Among them include: Centropol Telecom, COOP Mobil, DH Telecom, LAMA Mobile, Oskarta, Quadruple, SazkaMobil, Studentfone.

== Corporate responsibility ==
Vodafone is environmentally friendly and the first operator to launch a so-called Green network. More than two-thirds of its telecommunications network is supplied from renewable sources (hydropower, biogas plants, combustion of biomass, wind, solar) and the remaining 30% of energy consumption annually relies on 20,000 trees being planted in cooperation with the Agency for Nature Conservation and Landscape. According to a number of different parameters (material production, transportation, energy consumption) Vodafone is granted the environmental assessment Eco-class. The Vodafone Foundation, a non-profit organization since its founding in 2006, has distributed more than 125 million CZK. It supports young people in particular and all others who use their energy and creativity for the benefit of the community and society. Within the accelerator program Laboratory, the Vodafone Foundation helps implement ideas and projects, providing grants, regular meetings and mentoring and its successful graduates even have the opportunity to go abroad.

== Management ==
Petr Dvořák is the CEO of Vodafone Czech Republic since 2018. Balesh Sharma was director from 2013 to 2017 and Jiří Báča between 2017 and 2018.

== See also ==
- List of mobile network operators in Europe
