= Lou Schizas =

Canadian journalist

Lou Schizas is a Canadian financial analyst. He is best known for his work as an equities analyst for the Canadian specialty channel Business News Network (BNN) since its launch in September 1999 until August 24, 2007. He was also a daily contributor to national network CTV’s morning flagship program, Canada AM.

Schizas was an on-air radio personality on Corus Entertainment radio stations AM640 (CFMJ) in Toronto and AM980 (CFPL (AM)) in London until September 2018 when Corus tried to terminate its relationship with him with an offer of 1 month after 18 years of outstanding business and market analysis. Schizas retained a labour lawyer and successfully settled on 15 months of working notice. This involved working for the Corus station in Hamilton and London. His last day with Corus was December 10 2019.

Schizas taught finance at the Sheridan College Institute of Technology and Advanced Learning.

Before joining BNN, Schizas was a financial adviser based in Calgary where he sold tax-sheltered investments. He has also written a financial column for the Calgary Sun, hosted a radio program called The Money Manager on AM 1060 CKMX and performed media relations work for community groups.

Schizas holds a Bachelor of Arts in Economics from the University of Western Ontario and did graduate work at the State University of New York at Stony Brook. He also holds Canadian Investment Manager (CIM) designation, and is a Fellow of the Canadian Securities Institute.

Although Schizas is a Canadian citizen, he grew up in New York City. His daughter Madeline is an Olympic figure skater and four-time Canadian national champion.
