= Madeline Schizas =

Canadian figure skater (born 2003)

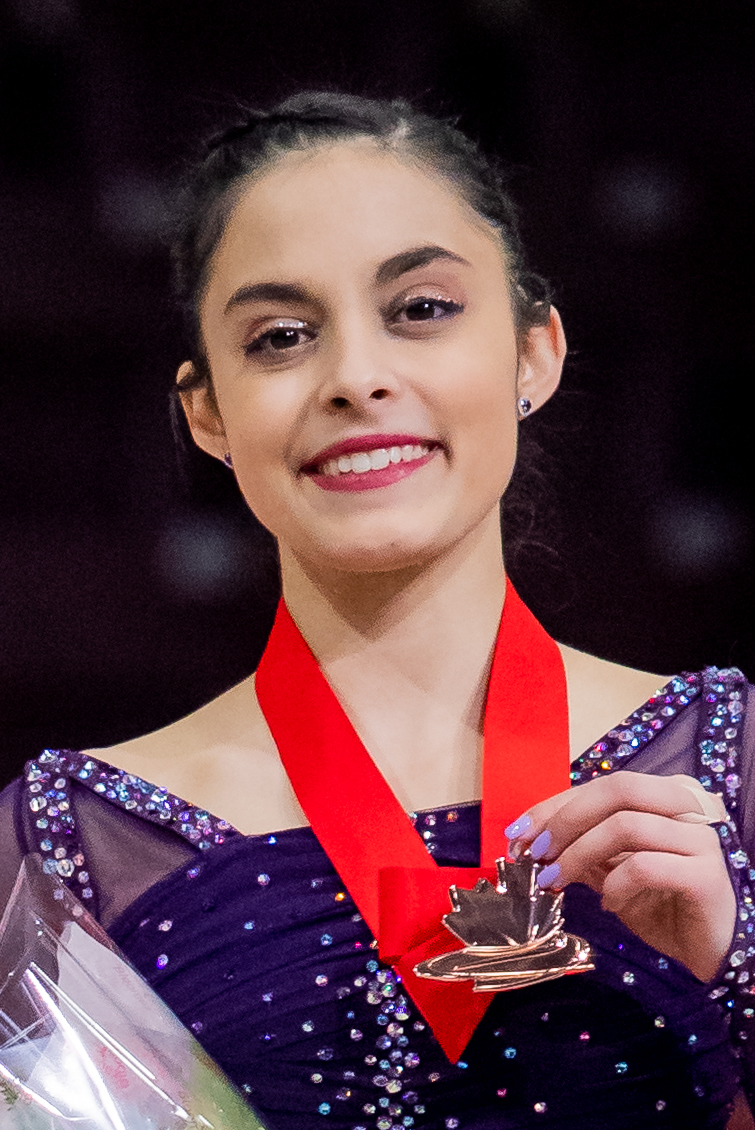
- Madeline Schizas at the 2020 Canadian Championships

Personal information
- Born: February 14, 2003 (age 23) Oakville, Ontario, Canada
- Height: 1.50 m (4 ft 11 in)

Figure skating career
- Country: Canada
- Discipline: Women's singles
- Coach: Nancy Lemaire; Alison Purkiss
- Skating club: Milton Skating Club
- Began skating: 2006
- Highest WS: 30th (2021-22)

Medal record
Canadian Championships
| Gold medal – first place | 2022 Ottawa | Singles |
| Gold medal – first place | 2023 Oshawa | Singles |
| Gold medal – first place | 2025 Laval | Singles |
| Gold medal – first place | 2026 Gatineau | Singles |
| Silver medal – second place | 2024 Calgary | Singles |
| Bronze medal – third place | 2020 Mississauga | Singles |

Madeline Christine Alyette Schizas (born February 14, 2003) is a Canadian figure skater. She is a three-time ISU Challenger Series bronze medallist, the 2020 Challenge Cup bronze medallist, and a four-time Canadian national champion (2022–23, 2025–26). She represented Canada at the 2022 and 2026 Winter Olympics.

== Personal life ==
Schizas was born on February 14, 2003, in Oakville, Ontario. She is the daughter of economist Linda Nazareth, and former broadcaster Lou Schizas. Her mother is of Indian Canadian ancestry while her father is Greek Canadian and French Canadian.

Schizas attended White Oaks Secondary School in Oakville. She was accepted to study Urban Planning at the University of Waterloo beginning in the fall of 2021 and stated her long-term aim was to become a physician. She subsequently transferred to McMaster University, where she graduated from in June 2026.

== Career ==
=== Early years ===
Schizas began learning to skate in 2006. As a child, she attended the 2010 Winter Olympics skating competitions in Vancouver, and in later years would cite witnessing bronze medallist Joannie Rochette's famous short program as "an inspiring moment, and it's one I will never forget." She placed sixth skating in the novice ranks at the 2018 Canadian Championships and won silver as a junior at the 2019 Canadian Championships.

In 2019, she served as a skating double during the filming of the Netflix drama Spinning Out.

=== 2019–2020 season: National bronze ===
Making her junior international debut, Schizas placed fifth at the Volvo Open Cup in November 2019 in Riga, Latvia. She then won gold in the senior women's category at the Skate Canada Challenge, qualifying her to compete as a senior at the 2020 Canadian Championships. At the Championships in January, she placed second in the short program despite performing only a double toe loop as the second part of her planned jump combination. She was third in the free skate after making several jump errors, including four singled attempts at a double Axel, and as a result, won the bronze medal, finishing 7.47 points behind the champion, Emily Bausback, and 0.87 behind silver medallist Alison Schumacher. Schizas remarked afterward, "the four single Axels, I don't even know what I was thinking, and the fourth one was an invalid combo, so there were some mental mistakes, but I think it comes along with experience, which you cannot buy."

In February, Schizas won gold in Group II junior ladies at the Bavarian Open. Her senior international debut came later that month at the International Challenge Cup in The Hague, Netherlands. Ranked sixth in the short and third in the free, she finished third overall behind Japan's Rika Kihira and Yuhana Yokoi and was awarded the bronze medal. Her score, 175.56, was the highest score by any Canadian lady that season, though it did not count toward the official ISU Season Best Scores. She was also the only Canadian lady to medal at any senior event that season. Despite this fact, she was passed up for the 2020 World Championships and the 2020 Junior Worlds in favour of more experienced competitors.

=== 2020–2021 season: Worlds debut ===
Schizas was named to the Canadian national team by virtue of being the reigning national bronze medallist. She was assigned to make her Grand Prix debut at the 2020 Skate Canada International, but the event was cancelled as a result of the coronavirus pandemic. Schizas planned to introduce the triple Lutz jump into her programs for the new season, having worked on it for a few years previously without sufficient results. Repeating her short program from the previous season, she selected the music from The Umbrellas of Cherbourg for a new free skate, in tribute to ice dancers Tessa Virtue and Scott Moir, who had performed to it in the 2007–08 season.

With the pandemic continuing to affect competitions, Schizas first won the Ontario Sectional Championships, held virtually. The 2021 Skate Canada Challenge was also organized virtually, filmed in November and December and then judged in January. She placed fourth in the short program, executing only a double toe loop as part of her combination and making a serious error on her triple loop. She won the free skate decisively, landing six of seven planned triple jumps, including a triple Lutz-triple toe loop combination for the first time. She won her second consecutive gold medal at Challenge. This would have qualified her to the 2021 Canadian Championships, but they were cancelled as a result of the pandemic, making it impossible to hold an in-person contest. Skating journalist Beverley Smith remarked, "we can't technically call Madeline Schizas a Canadian champion", "but effectively, she is."

On February 25, Schizas was announced as one of the two ladies' entries' to the 2021 World Championships in Stockholm, along with Emily Bausback, her debut at an ISU championship. She placed thirteenth, including setting a personal best with a ninth-place finish in the short program. Schizas' placement qualified a berth for Canada at the 2022 Winter Olympics in Beijing.

=== 2021–2022 season: First National title, Beijing Olympics ===
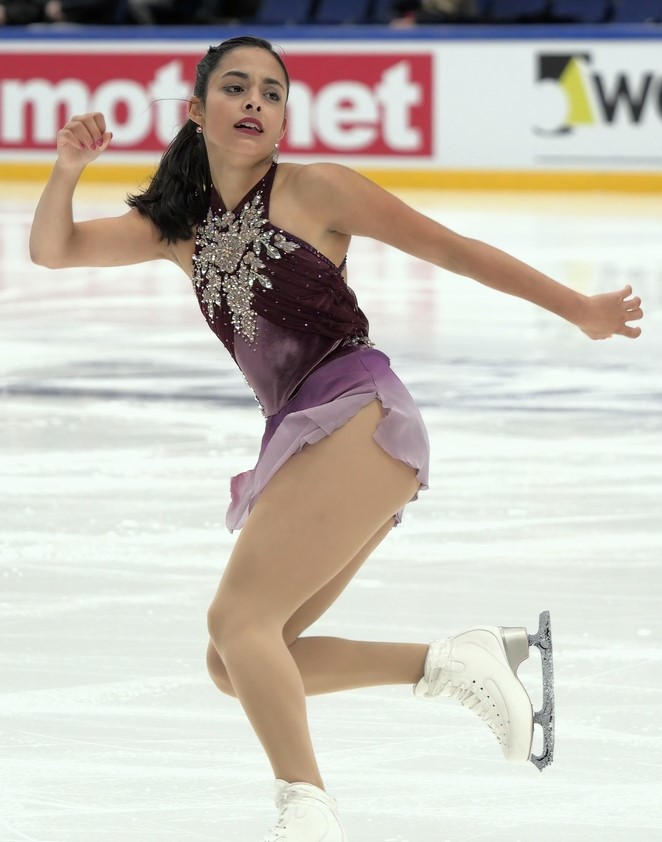
Schizas performing her short program at the 2021 CS Finlandia Trophy

In addition to longtime choreographer Asher Hill, Schizas collaborated on her Madama Butterfly free program with Lance Vipond, the regular choreographer of retired Canadian women's skating star Kaetlyn Osmond. She began the season at the Skating Club of Boston's Cranberry Cup, where she finished in fifth. She was next assigned to make her Challenger debut at the 2021 CS Finlandia Trophy, where she placed ninth, including setting a new personal best in the free skate. Schizas said she was pleased with the free skate, an opportunity to introduce new technical content.

Schizas made her Grand Prix debut at the 2021 Skate Canada International, where she placed ninth in both segments for eighth place overall, with a new personal best in total score. She was the highest-ranked Canadian woman in the event, finishing 26.68 points ahead of the next-ranked Emily Bausback in eleventh. She identified adding speed to her skating as her primary focus for improvement. In the interval between events, she competed domestically, winning the Ontario Sectionals for the third consecutive year. At her second Grand Prix, the 2021 Rostelecom Cup, she placed fourth in the short program with a clean skate. She made two errors in the free skate, stepping out of her triple flip and then doubling a planned triple Salchow, but still finished sixth overall, the highest Grand Prix placement for a Canadian woman in four years. Schizas noted that Rostelecom was "the biggest audience I've ever skated to. I think it was a great experience for hopefully the Olympics and World Championships."

Not having finished behind another Canadian woman in competition in almost two years, Schizas entered the 2022 Canadian Championships as the favourite for the title. Skating cleanly in the short program, she won that segment by 12.70 points. Despite some jump errors, she easily won the free skate as well, taking the gold medal and becoming the presumptive nominee for the Canadian Olympic team. Speaking afterward, she said that looking ahead to Beijing, "my biggest goal is to avoid catching COVID" in the weeks remaining before departure. On January 9, she was named to the Olympic team.

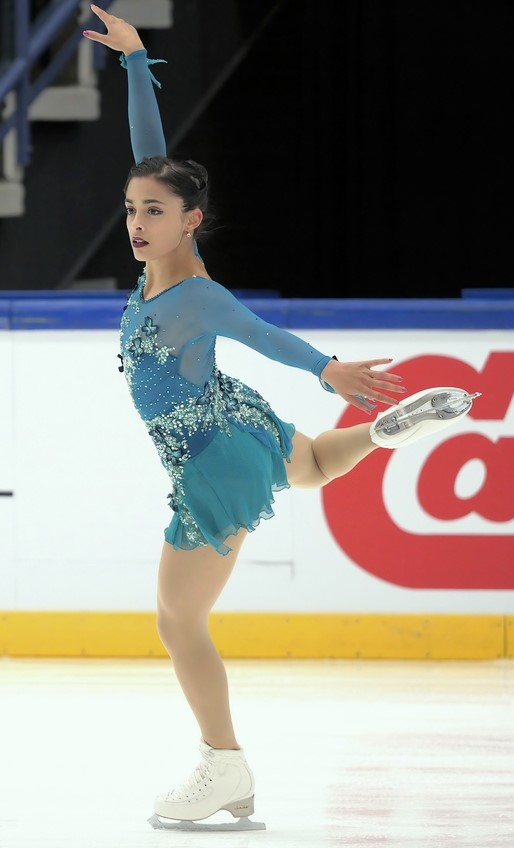
Schizas performing her free skate at the 2021 CS Finlandia Trophy

As the lone Canadian women's singles skater, Schizas began the 2022 Winter Olympics as her country's entry in the women's segments of the Olympic team event. With the women skating last among the short program segments, due to the underperformance of Canada's entries in the first three, especially that of Roman Sadovsky, Schizas was under significant pressure to perform and elevate Canada into the top five to qualify for the free skate. Delivering a clean short program and a new personal best score, she unexpectedly ranked third and took Canada from sixth place to fourth overall. Schizas said she was "a little bit nervous before today about being a part of the team and skating individually, but they gave me so much support, and I just loved the experience." Skating the free segment, she again placed third with a new personal best, the only error being a doubled attempt at a triple Lutz. Schizas' performances were widely cited as the highlight of the event for Team Canada, which finished in fourth place. However, the results of the team event were soon after thrown into doubt after a positive doping test for Russian skater Kamila Valieva resulted in the medal ceremony being delayed indefinitely. When asked about the possibility of the Canadian team being moved up to third, Schizas noted, "we have not won a medal yet; we're waiting on the outcome of the investigation. So once that happens, we'll see where the pieces fall."

In the Olympic women's event, Schizas stepped out of the landing of her triple Lutz and, as a result, had to salvage a combination on her triple loop, managing only a double toe loop instead of a triple. She placed twentieth, advancing to the free skate, and calling it "an up-and-down performance." She struggled with her jumps in the free skate, finishing eighteenth and moving up to nineteenth place overall. Schizas attributed her individual event performance to the difficulties of performing four programs in a short span and added that "the most important event here for me was the team event, as Canada had a chance at a medal there. That's really where my focus was."

Days after the Olympics concluded, the International Skating Union banned all Russian and Belarusian skaters from competing at the 2022 World Championships due to the invasion of Ukraine. This had a major impact on the women's field, which Russians dominated for most of the preceding eight years. Schizas entered the competition with the stated goal of placing in the top ten to recover a second berth for Canadian women. She placed tenth in the short program and said she was pleased with her performance after an "up and down kind of week" in practice sessions. Tenth in the free skate as well, she finished twelfth overall, with less than half a point separating her from ninth place.

In the off-season, Schizas was a guest participant in the Stars on Ice Canadian tour for the first time.

=== 2022–2023 season: Second consecutive National title ===
Beginning the season at the 2022 CS Nebelhorn Trophy, Schizas placed second in the short program but dropped to fifth overall after a tenth-place free skate. She shared the Fritz Geiger Memorial Trophy with the rest of the Canadian delegation, awarded to the top country at the competition. Schizas would later attribute her difficulties at Nebelhorn to heightened expectations from the Olympics.

Schizas' first Grand Prix assignment, the 2022 Skate Canada International, was held in Mississauga, the same location as her breakthrough bronze medal win at the Canadian Championships three seasons earlier. She said it was "weird to think how different of an experience that was." She unexpectedly won the short program, with fellow Canadian skater Gabrielle Daleman placing second. However, the free skate was once again a struggle, with several jump errors that saw her ranked ninth in the segment and dropping to seventh overall. She said afterward, "I knew full well that door was open. I just didn't figure out how to walk through it." Schizas went on to finish fifth at the 2022 Grand Prix of Espoo, her new highest placement on the Grand Prix. Following this, she was sent to the 2022 CS Golden Spin of Zagreb. Fourth in the short program, she rose to third in the free skate and won the bronze medal, her first on the Challenger circuit.

Entering the 2023 Canadian Championships as the favourite to retain her title, Schizas stepped out of her triple loop, but still placed first with score of 68.32, 7.11 points clear of her longtime friend and training mate Lia Pereira in second place. In the free skate she doubled a planned triple flip and had rough landings on a few other jumps in the second half of her program. She placed second in that segment, behind Kaiya Ruiter, but remained first overall and won her second national title. She called the experience "pretty surreal." Her coach, Nancy Lemaire, said that they would continue to look at improving her consistency on the flip jump, which Lemaire said she could do fine in practice. Schizas was named as Canada's lone women's entry to the 2023 World Championships, and also assigned to the 2023 Four Continents Championships.

Schizas finished tenth at the Four Continents Championships. Having struggled with her West Side Story free program all season, she opted to revert to her previous Madama Butterfly program for the World Championships. She came thirteenth. Schizas then joined Team Canada for the 2023 World Team Trophy. She finished fourth in the short program with a new personal best score of 69.76. She struggled in the free skate, coming ninth in that segment, and admitted afterward "I am happy to be done with the season now." Team Canada finished sixth.

=== 2023–2024 season ===
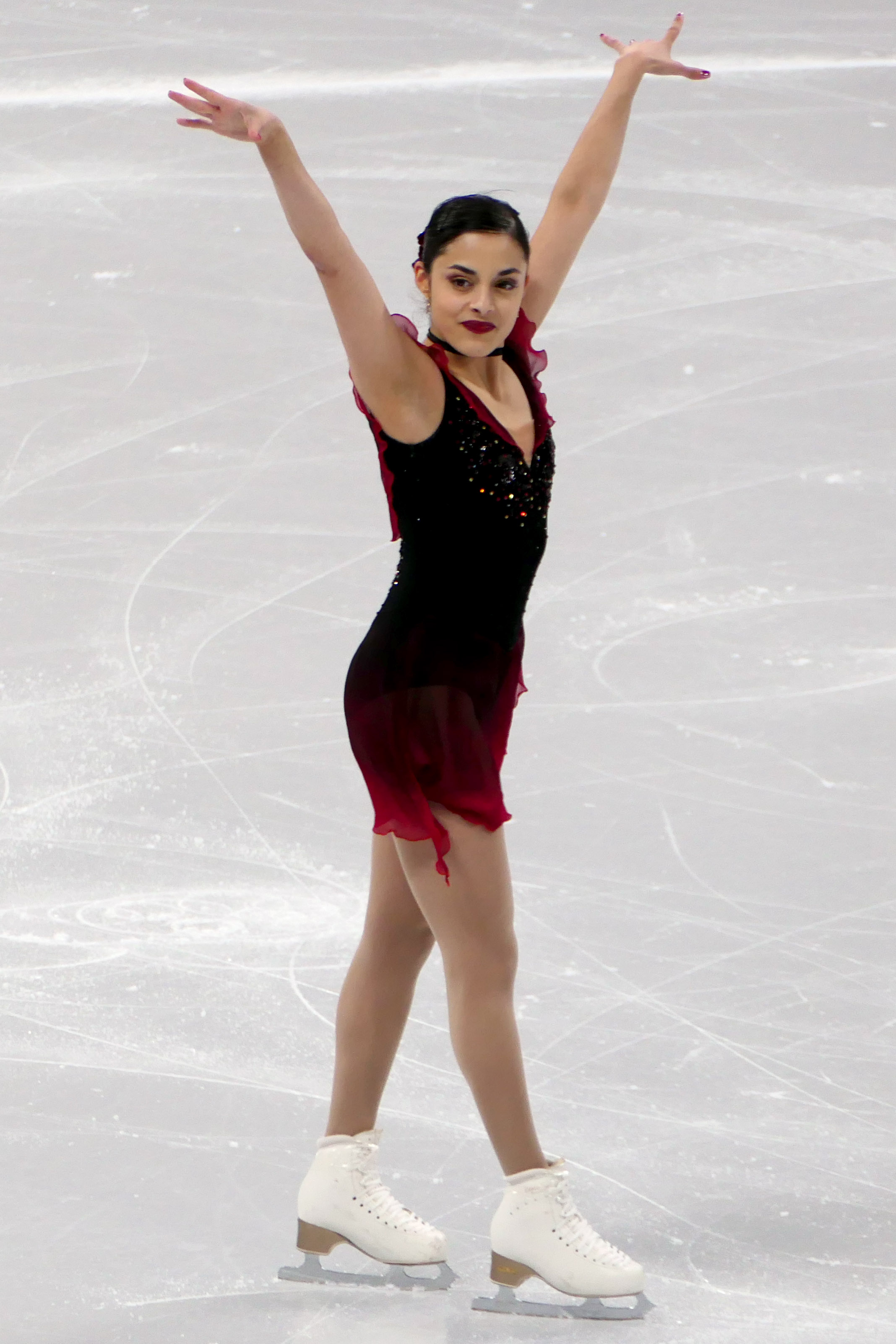
Schizas performing her short program at the 2024 World Championships

Following what she considered underwhelming results in the post-Olympic season, Schizas opted to seek new assistance with choreography. For her short program, she traveled to the Ice Academy of Montreal's London campus to work with Scott Moir, Madison Hubbell and Adrián Díaz using the music "Farrucas"; she noted it was popular in ice dance, saying "all three of my choreographers had used that music before — but none of them had choreographed it." For the free skate, she decided to use George Gershwin's "Summertime", working with the ice dance coaches Carol Lane and Juris Razgulajevs. On the technical side, she opted against increasing the difficulty of her elements, in favour of improving consistency.

Schizas began the season at the 2023 CS Nepela Memorial. She had the same short program score as South Korean Kim Chae-yeon, but lost the tiebreaker for the overall segment lead, thus rating second. She was fourth in the free skate, but won the bronze medal overall. She called the results "not perfect, but a big step-up from where we started last season, so I'm overall pretty happy with that." Moving on to the Grand Prix at the 2023 Skate Canada International, Schizas had a poor short program, making errors on all her jumping passes and finishing eighth in the segment. She rallied in the free skate, coming second in the segment with a new personal best (132.47), and rising to fourth overall. She had said she was "really angry" about the short program, "but I was able to put it behind me." She finished fifth at the 2023 Cup of China.

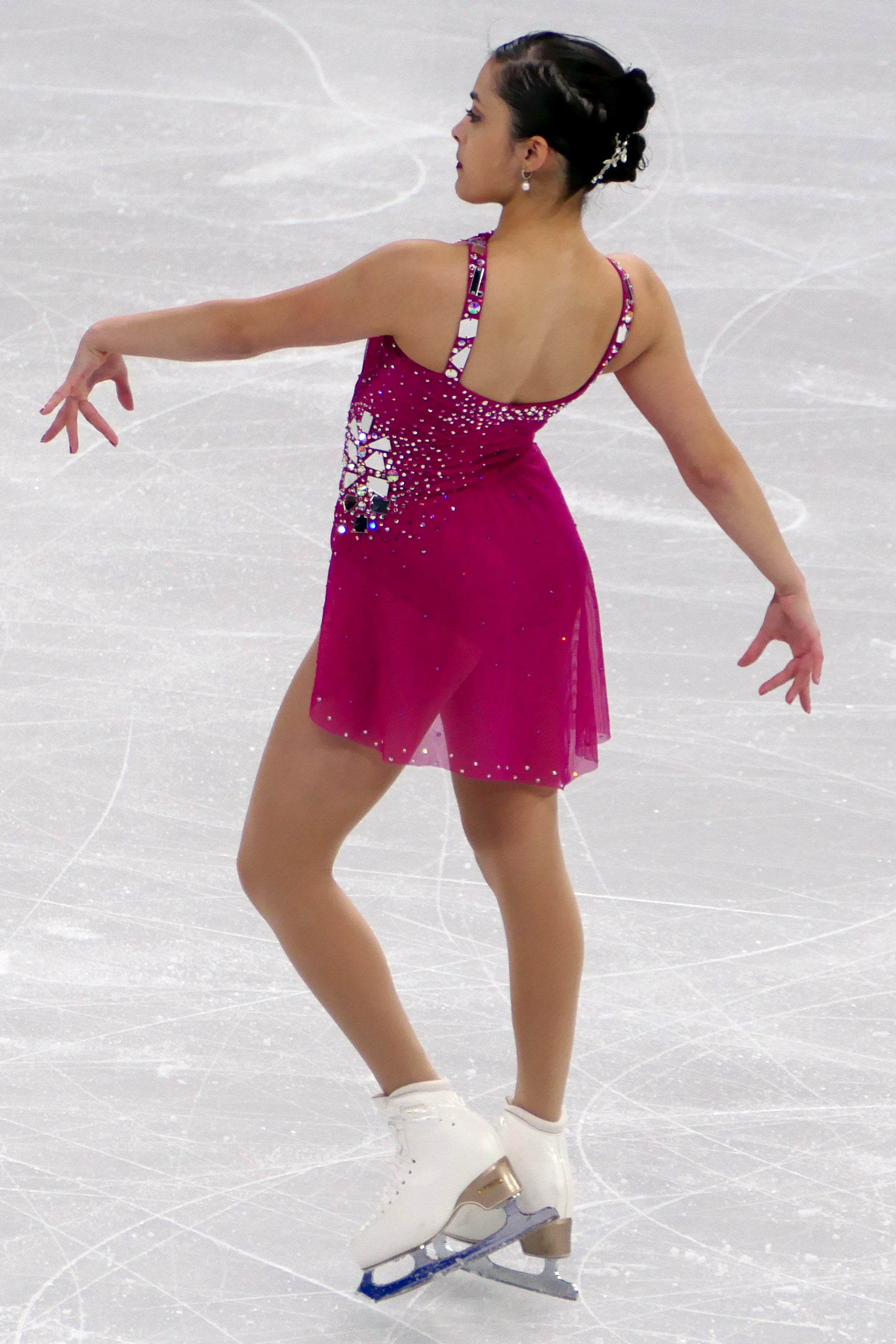
Schizas performing her free skate at the 2024 World Championships

Considered the heavy favourite and going into the 2024 Canadian Championships seeking a third consecutive victory, Schizas won the short program despite performing only a triple-double combination. However, she faltered badly in the free skate, making several jump errors, coming third in that segment and finishing second overall behind Kaiya Ruiter. She called herself "hugely disappointed" in her performance, in light of what she had considered successful training the leadup, saying that it now seemed "a waste of everyone's time, including mine."

In the short program at the 2024 Four Continents Championships in Shanghai, Schizas received a quarter underrotation call on the second part of her jump combination and stepped out of her triple loop, and was ranked ninth in the segment. She improved in the free skate, her only errors being another quarter underrotation on a triple loop and a stepout on a double Axel, and rose to sixth overall. Schizas called the result "a step up from nationals," adding that she had followed the advice of national ice dance champion Piper Gilles that "I could just wash off the bad vibes of the old costume" by getting a new one for the free skate program.

Schizas was assigned to Canada's lone berth at the 2024 World Championships, to be held in Montreal. She noted that this was particularly significant in terms of location, as both of her parents were originally from the city. Entering with the hope of reaching the top ten for the first time, she encountered difficulties in the short program, doubling a planned triple toe loop and landing her triple loop roughly, and came seventeenth in the segment. Despite this, she described the crowd reception as a "special moment." The free skate proved similarly difficult, and she was seventeenth there as well, but finished eighteenth overall. Schizas would later assess that "I had a hard time all week taking my space and being aggressive on some of the practices, which is sometimes needed, sometimes not. I had a hard time doing it, and it kind of snowballed."

=== 2024–25 season ===
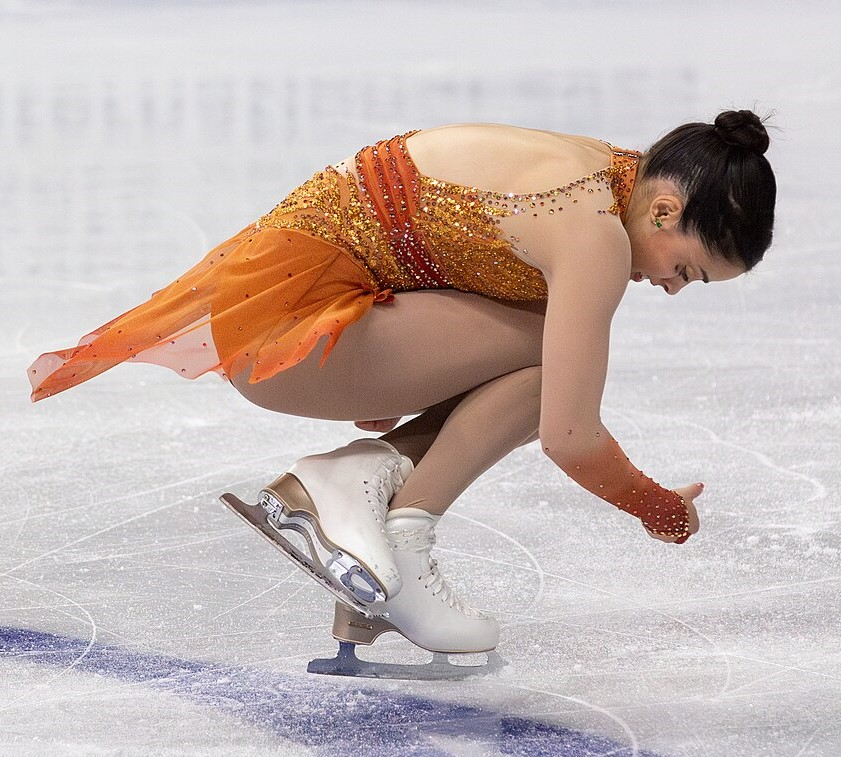
Schizas performing a sit spin at 2024 Skate Canada International

Following her disappointment at the 2024 World Championships, Schizas opted to reorganize her university studies to interfere less with her training, spreading her fourth year of courses out over two years. While performing with Stars on Ice in the off-season, the reception for a The Lion King show program was sufficiently positive that she decided to adapt it into a competitive program. She began the season by competing on the 2024–25 ISU Challenger Series, finishing sixth at the 2024 Cranberry Cup International, seventh at the 2024 Nebelhorn Trophy, and fifth at the 2024 Budapest Trophy.

On the 2024–25 Grand Prix circuit, Schizas competed first at the 2024 Skate Canada International, where she finished fifth in the short program, fourth in the free skate, and fifth overall. Despite this being a lower ordinal than the previous year, she cited it as an improvement due to being only 1.33 points behind bronze medalist Hana Yoshida, as well as having been consistent across both programs. Her total score of 190.04 was her best in two seasons. Four weeks later, Schizas finished seventh at the 2024 Cup of China.

Following the end of fall competitions, Schizas opted to discard her Danse Macabre free program in favour of an early debut of the program she had intended to use for the following Olympic season, the Chinese orchestral Butterfly Lovers' Violin Concerto. She explained with regard to her former program that "the pacing was perhaps not quite the right fit for me." She said that she hoped to further refine the program, including by consulting with a Chinese dance expert. After debuting the program at a Skate Ontario training day, Schizas entered the 2025 Canadian Championships in Laval seeking to reclaim her national title. She won both segments of the competition to take the gold medal by more than twenty points.

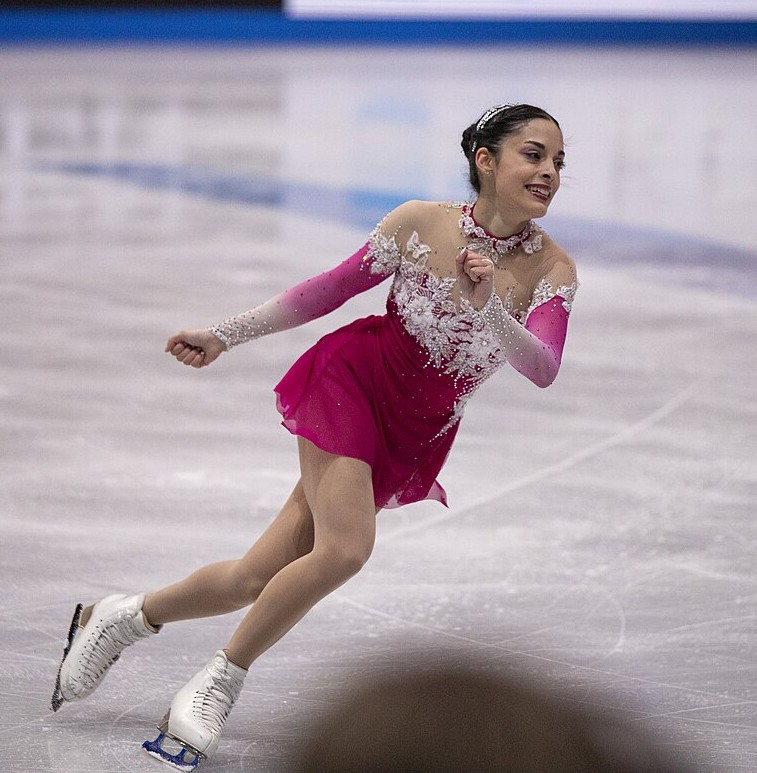
Schizas during the free skate at the 2025 World Championships

Upon arrival in Seoul for the 2025 Four Continents Championships, Schizas was one of several members of the Canadian delegation afflicted by a stomach virus. Despite this, she was able to compete, finishing in twelfth place. Speaking after the free skate, she credited "the Canadian team staff, who helped me be able to skate today. I wasn't sure I’d be able to do it."

The 2025 World Championships in Boston served as the primary qualifying event for the 2026 Winter Olympics in Milan–Cortina d'Ampezzo, with Schizas' main goal going into the event being to place in the top ten, which would create the possibility of Canada qualifying two women. She finished sixth in the short program, but after doubling a planned triple Lutz in the free skate she came eleventh in that segment and finished eleventh overall. Her total score of 190.79 was 3.37 points behind tenth-place Kim Chae-yeon of South Korea.

Selected to compete for Team Canada at the 2025 World Team Trophy, Schizas placed seventh in the women's singles event and Team Canada finished in fifth place overall. She said the team was better prepared than during its previous appearance at the event, when the skaters were World Team Trophy rookies.

=== 2025–26 season: Milano Cortina Olympics ===
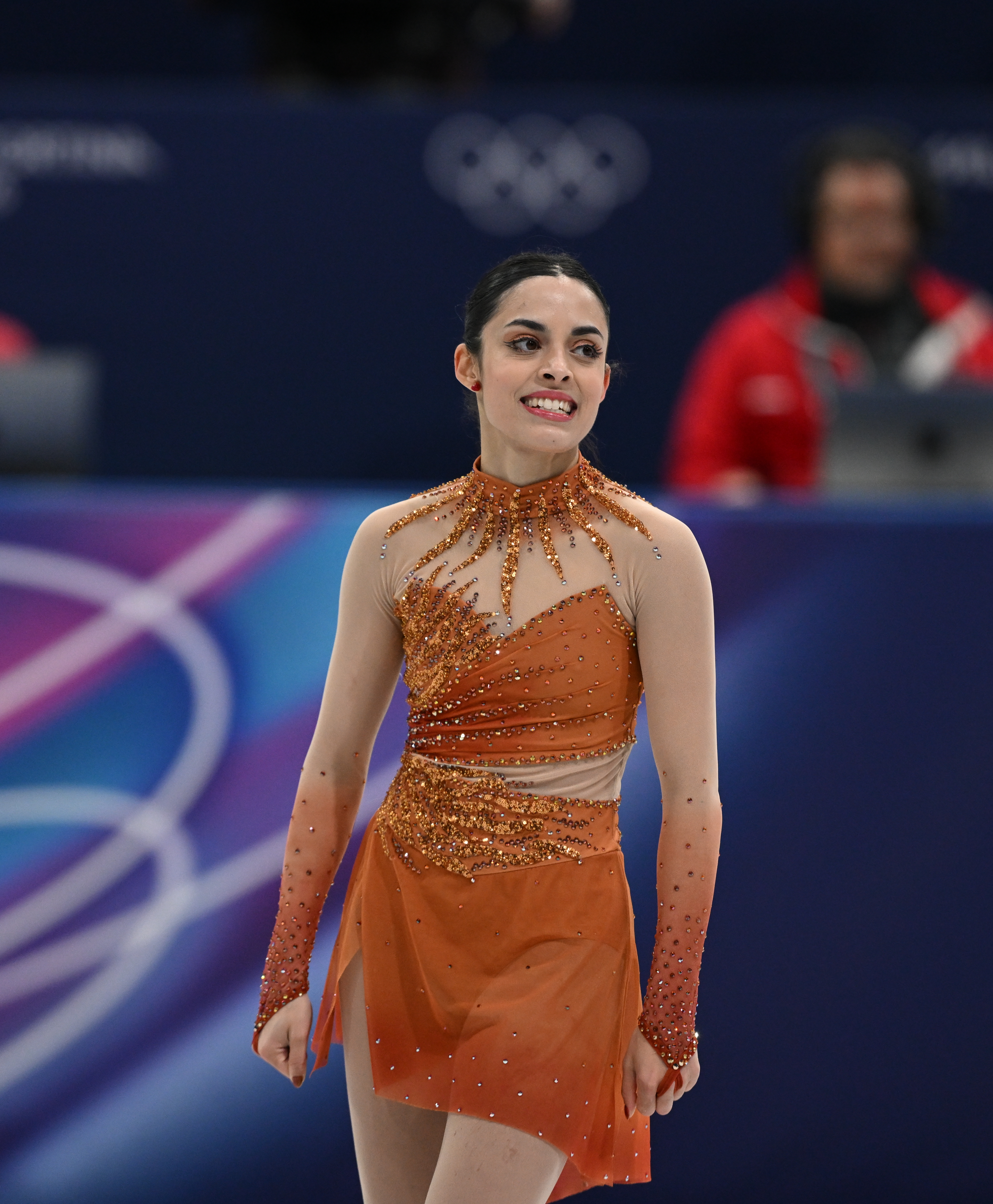
Madeline after her short program at the 2026 Winter Olympics

In June, Schizas shared that she had intended to keep her The Lion King short program for the upcoming Olympic season but due to quoted fees being issued to her by The Walt Disney Company for clearance rights, she opted to have a new short program created. As a result, she decided to reuse her 2022–23 short program, Black Swan.

Schizas opened her season by competing on the Challenger Series, finishing tenth at the 2025 CS Kinoshita Group Cup and winning bronze at the 2025 CS Denis Ten Memorial Challenge.

She then went on to compete on the 2025–26 Grand Prix circuit, finishing ninth at 2025 Skate Canada International. Following the event, Schizas opted to return to her The Lion King short program at the behest of Skate Canada. Going on to compete at the 2025 Finlandia Trophy, she placed third in the short program and fifth in the free skate, finishing fifth overall.

In January, Schizas competed at the 2026 Canadian Championships, winning her fourth national title. She was subsequently named to the 2026 Winter Olympic team. "I’m so excited to be going to a second Olympics," she said. "The first one was obviously COVID. I’m really excited I’ll have my family there. My aunts and uncle are coming. My parents are coming. So, I’m really, really excited that they’re all going to be there."

On February 6, Schizas placed sixth in the short program in the 2026 Winter Olympics Figure Skating Team Event. Despite a technical glitch with her music at the beginning, she said, "I'm happy with my performance today. I think that I skated my elements very well."

In the individual event, Schizas finished the short program in twenty-fifth place after she doubled an attempted triple loop jump; this was an invalid element, which gave her no points. She failed to qualify for the free skate.

The following month, Schizas competed at the 2026 World Championships in Prague where she placed fifteenth overall, after fifteenth-place finishes in both the short program and the free skate. After her short program she shared, "I'm happy with the way I skated. I think I was able to show a lot of resilience today, coming back and putting my previous performances behind me for the World Championships. I was very relieved."

== Skating technique ==
Unlike most skaters, Schizas spins and jumps clockwise, although she is not left-handed.

== Programs ==
| Season | Short program | Free skate | Exhibition | Ref. |
|---|---|---|---|---|
| 2019–20 | "Stranger in Paradise" From Kismet By Alexander Borodin, Robert Wright & George Forrest Performed by Sarah Brightman Choreo. by Asher Hill | Miss Saigon; 1. "Overture"; 2. "I Still Believe" All by Claude-Michel Schönberg Choreo. by Asher Hill | —N/a | |
| 2020–21 | "Stranger in Paradise" From Kismet By Alexander Borodin, Robert Wright & George Forrest Performed by Sarah Brightman Choreo. by Asher Hill | "I Will Wait for You" From The Umbrellas of Cherbourg By Michel Legrand, Jacques Demy & Norman Gimbel Choreo. by Asher Hill | —N/a | |
| 2021–22 | "Dulcea Si Tandra Mea Fiara" By Eugen Doga & Victoria Demici Performed by Catalina Caraus Choreo. by Asher Hill | Madama Butterfly; 1. "Entrance of Butterfly"; 2. "Love Duet"; 3. "Goro's Entrance"; 4. "Un bel dì, vedremo" All by Giacomo Puccini Choreo. by Lance Vipond | "It's Oh So Quiet" Performed by Björk | |
| 2022–23 | Black Swan; "Nina's Dream"; "Stumbled Beginnings" By Clint Mansell Choreo. by Asher Hill | West Side Story; 1. Prologue; 2. End Credits; 3. I Feel Pretty Performed by Rachel Zegler; 4. America All by Leonard Bernstein & Stephen Sondheim Choreo. by Lance Vipond | "Deja Vu" By Olivia Rodrigo | |
| 2022–23 | Black Swan; "Nina's Dream"; "Stumbled Beginnings" By Clint Mansell Choreo. by Asher Hill | Madama Butterfly | "Don't Rain on My Parade" From Glee) Performed by Lea Michele | |
| 2023–24 | "Farrucas" By Pepe Romero, Chano Lobato, Maria Magdalena & Paco Romero; "Solea Grana" By Estrella Morente Choreo. by Madison Hubbell, Scott Moir & Adrián Díaz | "Summertime" From Porgy and Bess By George Gershwin, DuBose Heyward & Ira Gershwin Performed by Ella Fitzgerald & Louis Armstrong Choreo. by Carol Lane & Juris Razgulajevs | "Everybody Wants to be a Cat" From The Aristocats Performed by Dimie Cat | |
| 2024–25 | The Lion King; "Spirit" By Beyoncé, Timothy Lee McKenzie & Ilya Salmanzadeh; "Grasslands Chant" By Lebo M; "Remember" By Hans Zimmer Choreo. by Alison Purkiss | Danse macabre By Camille Saint-Saëns Performed by Yevgeny Sudbin, Orchestre symphonique de Montréal & Kent Nagano Choreo. by Madison Hubbell, Scott Moir & Adrián Díaz; "Butterfly Lovers' Violin Concerto" By He Zhanhao, Chen Gang, & Shanghai Symphony Orchestra Performed by Lü Siqing & Beijing Central Philharmonic Orchestra Choreo. by Alison Purkiss | Goddess by Laufey | |
| 2025–26 | Black Swan; The Lion King | "Butterfly Lovers' Violin Concerto" | Where Is My Husband; by Raye | |
| 2026–27 | Why Don't You Do Right performed by Sinead O'Connor; Sing, Sing, Sing by Louis Prima | Je t'ai dans la peau; Hymne à l'amour by Patricia Kaas; La Foule by Edith Piaf | | |

== Competitive highlights ==
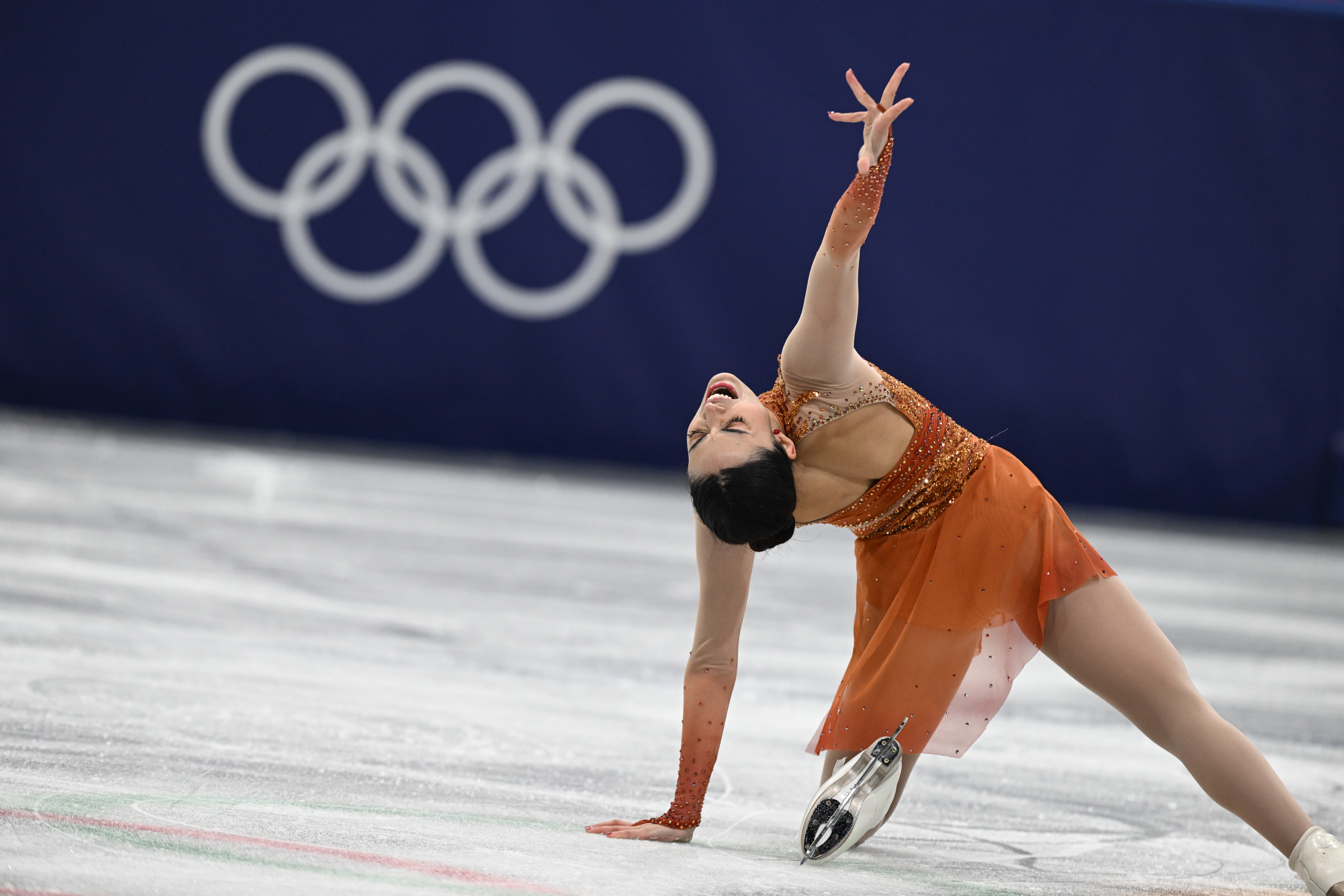
Schizas performing at the 2026 Winter Olympics

- GP – Event of the ISU Grand Prix Series
- CS – Event of the ISU Challenger Series
- TBD – Assigned
- WD – Withdrew from competition
- C – Event was cancelled
- Medals at team events are awarded for the team results only. Individual placements at team events are listed in parentheses.

Competition placements at senior level
| Season | 2019–20 | 2020–21 | 2021–22 | 2022–23 | 2023–24 | 2024–25 | 2025–26 | 2026-27 |
|---|---|---|---|---|---|---|---|---|
| Winter Olympics | | | 18th | | | | 25th | |
| Winter Olympics (Team event) | | | 4th | | | | 5th | |
| World Championships | | 13th | 12th | 13th | 18th | 11th | 15th | |
| Four Continents Championships | | | | 10th | 6th | 12th | | |
| Canadian Championships | 3rd | C | 1st | 1st | 2nd | 1st | 1st | |
| World Team Trophy | | | | 6th (7th) | | 5th (7th) | | |
| GP Cup of China | | | | | 5th | 7th | | |
| GP Finland | | | | 5th | | | 5th | |
| GP NHK Trophy | | | | | | | | TBD |
| GP Rostelecom Cup | | | 6th | | | | | |
| GP Skate Canada | | C | 8th | 7th | 4th | 5th | 9th | 8th |
| CS Budapest Trophy | | | | | | 5th | | 11th |
| CS Cranberry Cup | | | 5th | 4th | | 6th | | |
| CS Denis Ten Memorial | | | | | | | 3rd | |
| CS Finlandia Trophy | | | 9th | | | | | |
| CS Golden Spin of Zagreb | | | | 3rd | | | | |
| CS Kinoshita Group Cup | | | | | | | 10th | |
| CS Nebelhorn Trophy | | | | 5th | | 7th | | |
| CS Nepela Memorial | | | | | 3rd | | | |
| Challenge Cup | 3rd | | | | | | | |
| Skate Canada Challenge | 1st | 1st | | | | | | |

Competition placements at junior level
| Season | 2018–19 | 2019–20 |
|---|---|---|
| Canadian Championships | 2nd | |
| Bavarian Open | | 1st |
| Skate Canada Challenge | 2nd | |
| Volvo Open Cup | | 5th |

== Detailed results ==
ISU personal best scores in the +5/-5 GOE System
| Segment | Type | Score | Event |
|---|---|---|---|
| Total | TSS | 192.14 | 2021 Rostelecom Cup |
| Short program | TSS | 69.76 | 2023 World Team Trophy |
| Short program | TES | 38.48 | 2021 World Championships |
| Short program | PCS | 32.46 | 2022 Skate Canada International |
| Free skating | TSS | 132.47 | 2023 Skate Canada International |
| Free skating | TES | 70.21 | 2023 Skate Canada International |
| Free skating | PCS | 64.51 | 2022 Winter Olympics (Team event) |

=== Senior level ===
- Medals at team events are awarded for the team results only. Individual placements at team events are listed in parentheses.

Results in the 2019–20 season
| Date | Event | SP | | FS | | Total | |
| Date | Event | P | Score | P | Score | P | Score |
|---|---|---|---|---|---|---|---|
| Nov 27 – Dec 1, 2019 | 2020 Skate Canada Challenge | 4 | 52.96 | 1 | 104.04 | 1 | 157.00 |
| Jan 13–19, 2020 | (Canada) 2020 Canadian Championships | 2 | 60.66 | 3 | 107.41 | 3 | 168.07 |
| Feb 20–23, 2020 | (Netherlands) 2020 International Challenge Cup | 6 | 60.32 | 3 | 115.24 | 3 | 175.56 |

Results in the 2020–21 season
| Date | Event | SP | | FS | | Total | |
| Date | Event | P | Score | P | Score | P | Score |
|---|---|---|---|---|---|---|---|
| Jan 8–17, 2021 | 2021 Skate Canada Challenge | 4 | 57.71 | 1 | 117.94 | 1 | 175.65 |
| Mar 22–28, 2021 | (Sweden) 2021 World Championships | 9 | 68.77 | 14 | 117.01 | 13 | 185.78 |

Results in the 2021–22 season
| Date | Event | SP | | FS | | Total | |
| Date | Event | P | Score | P | Score | P | Score |
|---|---|---|---|---|---|---|---|
| Aug 11–15, 2021 | (United States) 2021 Cranberry Cup International | 6 | 59.70 | 3 | 113.64 | 5 | 173.34 |
| Oct 7–10, 2021 | (Finland) 2021 CS Finlandia Trophy | 12 | 59.29 | 8 | 125.44 | 9 | 184.73 |
| Oct 29–31, 2021 | 2021 Skate Canada International | 9 | 62.61 | 9 | 123.95 | 8 | 186.56 |
| Nov 26–28, 2021 | (Russia) 2021 Rostelecom Cup | 4 | 67.49 | 7 | 124.32 | 6 | 192.14 |
| Jan 6–12, 2022 | (Canada) 2022 Canadian Championships | 1 | 72.05 | 1 | 126.19 | 1 | 198.24 |
| Feb 4–7, 2022 | (China) 2022 Winter Olympics (Team event) | 3 | 69.60 | 3 | 132.04 | 4 | – |
| Feb 15–17, 2022 | (China) 2022 Winter Olympics | 19 | 60.53 | 17 | 115.03 | 18 | 175.56 |
| Mar 21–27, 2022 | (France) 2022 World Championships | 10 | 64.20 | 10 | 123.94 | 12 | 188.14 |

Results in the 2022–23 season
| Date | Event | SP | | FS | | Total | |
| Date | Event | P | Score | P | Score | P | Score |
|---|---|---|---|---|---|---|---|
| Aug 9–14, 2022 | (United States) 2022 Cranberry Cup International | 1 | 59.37 | 4 | 106.94 | 4 | 166.31 |
| Sep 21–24, 2022 | (Germany) 2022 CS Nebelhorn Trophy | 2 | 64.99 | 10 | 95.72 | 5 | 160.71 |
| Oct 28–30, 2022 | 2022 Skate Canada International | 1 | 67.90 | 9 | 112.69 | 7 | 180.59 |
| Nov 25–27, 2022 | (Finland) 2022 Grand Prix of Espoo | 5 | 65.19 | 5 | 122.65 | 5 | 187.84 |
| Dec 7–10, 2022 | (Croatia) 2022 CS Golden Spin of Zagreb | 4 | 58.66 | 3 | 124.62 | 3 | 183.28 |
| Jan 9–15, 2023 | (Canada) 2023 Canadian Championships | 1 | 68.32 | 2 | 128.15 | 1 | 196.47 |
| Feb 7–12, 2023 | (United States) 2023 Four Continents Championships | 9 | 60.11 | 10 | 99.62 | 10 | 159.73 |
| Mar 22–26, 2023 | (Japan) 2023 World Championships | 16 | 60.02 | 11 | 127.47 | 13 | 187.49 |
| Apr 13–16, 2023 | (Japan) 2023 World Team Trophy | 4 | 69.76 | 9 | 115.12 | 6 (7) | 184.88 |

Results in the 2023–24 season
| Date | Event | SP | | FS | | Total | |
| Date | Event | P | Score | P | Score | P | Score |
|---|---|---|---|---|---|---|---|
| Sep 28–30, 2023 | (Slovakia) 2023 CS Nepela Memorial | 2 | 67.42 | 4 | 121.46 | 3 | 188.88 |
| Oct 27–29, 2023 | 2023 Skate Canada International | 8 | 57.44 | 2 | 132.47 | 4 | 189.91 |
| Nov 10–12, 2023 | 2023 Cup of China | 7 | 61.53 | 5 | 118.05 | 5 | 179.58 |
| Jan 8–14, 2024 | (Canada) 2024 Canadian Championships | 1 | 63.63 | 3 | 109.27 | 2 | 172.90 |
| Jan 30 – Feb 4, 2024 | (China) 2024 Four Continents Championships | 9 | 61.57 | 6 | 124.12 | 6 | 185.69 |
| Mar 18–24, 2024 | (Canada) 2024 World Championships | 17 | 59.65 | 17 | 112.13 | 18 | 171.78 |

Results in the 2024–25 season
| Date | Event | SP | | FS | | Total | |
| Date | Event | P | Score | P | Score | P | Score |
|---|---|---|---|---|---|---|---|
| Aug 8-11, 2024 | (United States) 2024 CS Cranberry Cup International | 9 | 49.84 | 6 | 105.68 | 6 | 155.52 |
| Sep 18-21, 2024 | (Germany) 2024 CS Nebelhorn Trophy | 6 | 60.61 | 7 | 111.61 | 7 | 172.22 |
| Oct 11-13, 2024 | (Hungary) 2024 CS Budapest Trophy | 4 | 65.21 | 5 | 110.50 | 5 | 175.71 |
| Oct 25–27, 2024 | 2024 Skate Canada International | 5 | 65.28 | 4 | 124.76 | 5 | 190.04 |
| Nov 22–24, 2024 | 2024 Cup of China | 8 | 61.10 | 8 | 119.67 | 7 | 180.77 |
| Jan 14-19, 2025 | (Canada) 2025 Canadian Championships | 1 | 70.00 | 1 | 133.87 | 1 | 203.87 |
| Feb 19–23, 2025 | (South Korea) 2025 Four Continents Championships | 11 | 59.70 | 11 | 116.77 | 12 | 176.47 |
| Mar 26–30, 2025 | (United States) 2025 World Championships | 6 | 69.18 | 11 | 121.61 | 11 | 190.79 |
| Apr 17–20, 2025 | (Japan) 2025 World Team Trophy | 6 | 63.93 | 7 | 124.57 | 5 (7) | 188.50 |

Results in the 2025–26 season
| Date | Event | SP | | FS | | Total | |
| Date | Event | P | Score | P | Score | P | Score |
|---|---|---|---|---|---|---|---|
| Sep 5–7, 2025 | (Japan) 2025 CS Kinoshita Group Cup | 3 | 66.57 | 10 | 105.83 | 10 | 172.40 |
| Oct 1–4, 2025 | (Kazakhstan) 2025 CS Denis Ten Memorial Challenge | 2 | 55.55 | 3 | 108.84 | 3 | 164.39 |
| Oct 31 – Nov 2, 2025 | 2025 Skate Canada International | 12 | 48.72 | 7 | 117.92 | 9 | 166.64 |
| Nov 21–23, 2025 | (Finland) 2025 Finlandia Trophy | 3 | 65.16 | 5 | 123.44 | 5 | 188.60 |
| Jan 5–11, 2026 | (Canada) 2026 Canadian Championships | 4 | 64.92 | 1 | 135.95 | 1 | 200.86 |
| Feb 6–8, 2026 | (Italy) 2026 Winter Olympics – Team event | 6 | 64.97 | 5 | 125.00 | 5 | —N/a |
| Feb 17–19, 2026 | (Italy) 2026 Winter Olympics | 25 | 55.38 | —N/a | —N/a | 25 | 55.38 |
| Mar 24–29, 2026 | (Czech Republic) 2026 World Championships | 15 | 61.35 | 15 | 116.94 | 15 | 178.29 |

Results in the 2026-27 season
| Date | Event | SP | | FS | | Total | |
| Date | Event | P | Score | P | Score | P | Score |
|---|---|---|---|---|---|---|---|
| Oct 15-18, 2026 | (Hungary) 2026 CS Budapest Trophy | 9 | 60.10 | 10 | 107.15 | 11 | 167.25 |
| Oct 30 - Nov 1, 2026 | 2026 Skate Canada International | 9 | 57.95 | 7 | 119.43 | 8 | 177.38 |

=== Junior level ===
Results in the 2018–19 season
| Date | Event | SP | | FS | | Total | |
| Date | Event | P | Score | P | Score | P | Score |
|---|---|---|---|---|---|---|---|
| Nov 28 – Dec 2, 2018 | 2018 Skate Canada Challenge | 2 | 53.04 | 6 | 81.43 | 3 | 134.47 |
| Jan 13–20, 2019 | (Canada) 2019 Canadian Championships (Junior) | 6 | 46.77 | 2 | 87.82 | 2 | 134.59 |

Results in the 2019–20 season
| Date | Event | SP | | FS | | Total | |
| Date | Event | P | Score | P | Score | P | Score |
|---|---|---|---|---|---|---|---|
| Nov 5–10, 2019 | (Latvia) 2019 Volvo Open Cup | 4 | 56.45 | 8 | 94.26 | 5 | 150.71 |
| Feb 3–9, 2020 | (Germany) 2020 Bavarian Open | 1 | 56.10 | 1 | 108.19 | 1 | 164.29 |

== See also ==
- List of University of Waterloo people
- List of people from Oakville, Ontario
