= Telesystems International Wireless =

Canadian global mobile communications operator

- Traded as: Nasdaq: TIWI; TSX: TIW
- Industry: Telecommunications
- Headquarters: Canada
- Website: tiw.ca

Telesystem International Wireless (TIW) was a Canadian-based holding company with global investments in mobile communications operators. The company's shares were listed on the Montreal Exchange and the Toronto Stock Exchange ("TIW") and NASDAQ ("TIWI").

At different times TIW owned or had interest in:

- Dolphin Telecom plc, attempting to deploy a pan-European digital specialized mobile radio network (ESMR) through its subsidiary Dolphin Telecom plc, Europe. At that time it offered TETRA services in the United Kingdom, in addition to analog SMR services in the United Kingdom, France, Germany, Belgium, Spain and Portugal.
- MobiFon S.A. operating a GSM network (known under CONNEX brand name) in Romania
- Cesky Mobil a.s. operating a GSM network (known under the brand name OSKAR) in the Czech Republic.
- In Brazil TIW was a strategic and operating partner of the country's fifth largest cellular group, with operations in four regions (among others, using brand names of Telemig, Tele Norte and Telet).
- In Asia through TIW Asia N.V., an affiliate company established in October 1999, it had cellular operations in India and China.

By 1999, TIW boasted over two million subscribers in four geographic regions. On December 31, 2004, TIW had only two operating subsidiaries, MobiFon A.S. in Romania and Oskar Mobil a.s. in the Czech Republic, with 6.7 million subscribers. In February 2005 Oskar Mobil a.s. acquired a UMTS (also known as 3G) licence.

In March to April 2005, TIW sold its two remaining subsidiaries to Vodafone Group. In April 2005, it announced Special Meeting of Shareholders to approve a Plan of Arrangement to begin and proceed with its liquidation, including the implementation of a claims process and the distribution of net cash to shareholders, cancel its common shares and proceed with its final distribution and be dissolved.
