= Nickelodeon (European TV network) =

- The Nickelodeon logo (since August 2023)
- Country: United Kingdom
- Broadcast area: Europe, Middle East, Africa

Programming
- Language: English

Ownership
- Owner: Paramount Networks EMEAA

History
- Launched: 1 September 1993

Nickelodeon is a pay television network dedicated to kids. Nickelodeon is widely available throughout Europe as a subscription service or free-to-air service; depending on what region in Europe you are living in. Nickelodeon is seen in 24.2 million households throughout Europe, via channels and blocks.

Nickelodeon is operated by Paramount Networks EMEAA on behalf of its owner Paramount Skydance. Nickelodeon first launched in Europe in the United Kingdom in 1993 followed by a 1995 launch in Germany, 1 year later in 1996 Nickelodeon launched a Pan-Scandinavian channel for viewers in Sweden, Norway, Denmark & Finland, following this Nickelodeon subsequently launched a pan-European version of the channel and other local Nickelodeon channels.

On June 6, 2026, Paramount said it was willing to divest some major kids' channels, including Nickelodeon and Cartoon Network in Europe, in exchange of winning an approval of the Paramount-WBD deal from the European Union.

== Pan-European Nickelodeon ==
The Pan-European version, known as Nickelodeon airs a selection of programming from Nickelodeon in the USA and local shows from Nickelodeon in the UK, Ireland, Australia and New Zealand. Nickelodeon Europe is a 24-hour pan-regional feed reaching Malta, Romania, Hungary, Albania, Czechia, Slovakia, Croatia, Bosnia & Herzegovina, Slovenia, Serbia, Montenegro, North Macedonia, Bulgaria, Estonia, Latvia, Lithuania, France and Ukraine. The channel is primarily available in English with additional soundtracks in Russian, Hungarian, Romanian, Croatian and Serbian, Slovenian, Bulgarian, Czech, French, Kazakh, Estonian, Lithuanian, Latvian & Turkish. A total of more than 68 million homes across Europe and Central Asia can view the pan-European version of Nickelodeon. In a number of countries in Europe also host a local version of the channel and/or localized programming blocks. The UK/Ireland version of the network launched their HD simulcast channel on 5 October 2010 over Sky, and it is expected that further launches of HD channels will occur across the continent in the next few years.

== Global on-air identity ==
In January 2010, Viacom International launched a global on-air identity campaign for its Nickelodeon channels worldwide (except Nickelodeon US, which adopted the new look identity 28 September 2009). The new look on air-identity debuted on France (29 January 2010), UK and Ireland (15 February 2010), Poland (1 March), in Africa on 13 March 2010, and on Nickelodeon Netherlands, Germany, Nickelodeon Austria and Nickelodeon German-speaking Switzerland on 31 March 2010. The new look design incorporates the newly designed Nickelodeon logo which originally launched on Nickelodeon US in September, 2009. The roll-out of Nickelodeon's new global on-air, online and offline branding will take place throughout 2010 on all Nickelodeon channels worldwide (with exception to Nickelodeon US). Nickelodeon Europe picked up the new 2011 look from Nick USA in 2012. The first country to pick up the new bumpers was Nickelodeon (UK and Ireland). It first got random airings of these bumpers in October 2011 and they were fully used from 2 January 2012.

== Localized Nickelodeon channels in Europe, The Middle East & Africa (excluding countries which use Nickelodeon Central & Eastern Europe) ==
Country	Title	Air Date	New Look Release Date	International broadcast	Note
United Kingdom	Nickelodeon UK	September 1, 1993 (the UK)	February 15, 2010	United Kingdom	
Republic of Ireland	Nickelodeon Ireland	February 2004 (Ireland)	February 15, 2010	Republic of Ireland - local advertising and sponsorship	Broadcasting licence registered with Czech Republic broadcasting regulator
Germany	Nickelodeon (German TV channel)	July 5, 1995 (Original), September 15, 2005 (Re-launch)	March 31, 2010	Switzerland, Austria, Liechtenstein, Italy (South Tyrol), Luxembourg	The German Version Is the only Version that is Free-to-air
Scandinavia	Nickelodeon (Scandinavian TV channel)	1996	2010	Norway, Denmark, Finland, Sweden	Formerly available in Sweden until a local Swedish feed was launched on June 18 2008
Israel	Nickelodeon (Israeli TV channel)	March 15, 1996 (Block), July 1, 2003 (Channel)	May 2, 2010		
Middle East & North Africa	Nickelodeon (Middle Eastern & North African TV channel)	July 16, 1996 (Original), January 5, 2015 (Re-launch)	January 5, 2015	Egypt, Lebanon, Syria, Palestine, United Arab Emirates, Oman, Qatar, Saudi Arabia, Bahrain, Kuwait, Iraq, Yemen, Jordan, Algeria, Libya, Morocco, Tunisia, Mauritania	The original Middle Eastern Nickelodeon ceased broadcast on September 8, 2011 with programs moving to MBC3 the channel was re-launched on the Emirati TV provider OSN, on January 5, 2015
Turkey	Nickelodeon (Turkish TV channel)	December 10, 1997	March 15, 2010	Azerbaijan, Cyprus	
Hungary	Nickelodeon (Hungarian TV channel)	August 1, 1998 (Block), October 6, 1999 (Channel)	March 15, 2010		
German-speaking Switzerland	Nickelodeon (Swiss TV channel)	September 28, 1998 (block), April 1, 2009	March, 2010	Liechtenstein	Autonomous sub-feed of Nickelodeon Germany for German-speaking Switzerland
Ukraine	Nickelodeon (Ukraine)	17 October, 1998 (block) 1 June 2023 (Channel)	2010		Aired as a programming block on QTV until September, 2017 when QTV ceased broadcast.
Estonia	Nickelodeon (Estonia)	October 17, 1998			Aired as a programming block on TV1 until 2001 when the block was closed due to low ratings and declining viewership, Nickelodeon Europe added an Estonian audio track in 2017.
Russia	Nickelodeon (Russian TV channel)	November 15, 1998	2010	Ukraine, Belarus, Georgia, Azerbaijan, Armenia, Kazakhstan, Kyrgyzstan, Uzbekistan, Turkmenistan, Tajikistan, Moldova, Baltic states	
Armenia	Nickelodeon (Armenia)	January 28, 2012			Aired as a programming block on Armenia 2 until 2015 when the block was closed due to their rights to Nickelodeon content having expired.
Spain, Portugal	Nickelodeon (Spanish and Portuguese TV channel)	March 27, 1999, June 1, 2005	2010	Andorra, Equatorial Guinea, Cape Verde, Angola, Mozambique	
Sub-Saharan Africa	Nickelodeon (Sub-Saharan African TV channel)	June 12, 1999 (block), July 1, 2008	2010		Nickelodeon's Pan-African channel reaches 49 countries across the continent.
Poland	Nickelodeon (Polish TV channel)	November 7, 1999 (block), July 10, 2008 (channel)	June 14, 2010		
Netherlands	Nickelodeon (Dutch TV channel)	February, 2002 (block), July 14, 2003 (channel)	March 31, 2010	Belgium	
Greece	Nickelodeon (Greek TV channel)	2003 (block on Channel 9), September 3, 2010 (channel)	September 3, 2010	Cyprus	
Italy	Nickelodeon (Italian TV channel)	November 1, 2004	2010	San Marino, Vatican City	
France	Nickelodeon (French TV channel)	November 16, 2005	January 26, 2010	Switzerland, Belgium, Luxembourg, Monaco, Morocco, Tunisia, Lebanon, Madagascar, Mauritius, Overseas France, Haiti	
Wallonia (Belgium)	Nickelodeon (Walloon TV channel)	July 14, 2006	2010		
