= Dora the Explorer (TV series) =

American children's animated TV series

- Genre: Adventure; Children
- Created by: Chris Gifford; Valerie Walsh Valdes; Eric Weiner
- Voices of: see below
- Theme music composer: Joshua Sitron; Billy Straus
- Opening theme: "Dora the Explorer Theme"
- Ending theme: "Dora the Explorer Theme" (instrumental)
- Country of origin: United States
- Original languages: English; Spanish
- No. of seasons: 8
- No. of episodes: 177 (list of episodes)

Production
- Executive producer: Chris Gifford
- Producers: Valerie Walsh Valdes; Eric Weiner
- Editors: Gayle McIntyre; Karyn Finley Powell; David Wigforss
- Running time: 23–24 minutes (regular); 44–46 minutes (specials)
- Production companies: Nickelodeon Animation Studio; Nick Jr. Productions (seasons 1–4); Nickelodeon Productions (seasons 5–8)

Original release
- Network: Nickelodeon (2000–19); Nick Jr. (2019)
- Release: August 14, 2000 – August 9, 2019

Related
- Go, Diego, Go!; Dora and Friends: Into the City!; Dora

Dora the Explorer is an American children's animated television series in the Dora the Explorer franchise, created by Chris Gifford, Valerie Walsh Valdes, and Eric Weiner that premiered on Nickelodeon on August 14, 2000, and ended on August 9, 2019. The series was produced by Nickelodeon Animation Studio.

The series focuses on the adventures of a Latina girl named Dora and her monkey friend Boots, with a particular emphasis on the Spanish language. The series is presented in the style of both an interactive CD-ROM game and a point-and-click adventure game, with gimmicks such as Dora asking the viewer to help her by showing the current items in her inventory and asking the viewer which one is best for the current scenario.

The series is currently scheduled to receive a live-action version for older viewers on Paramount+.

== Plot ==
From left to right: Swiper (in background), Dora, and Boots

The series centers around Dora Márquez, a seven-year-old Latina girl, with a love of embarking on quests related to an activity that she wants to partake of or a place that she wants to go to, accompanied by her talking purple backpack and anthropomorphic monkey companion named Boots (named for his beloved pair of red boots). Each episode is based around a series of cyclical events that occur along the way during Dora's travels, along with obstacles that she and Boots are forced to overcome or puzzles that they have to solve (with "assistance" from the viewing audience) relating to riddles, the Spanish language, or counting. Common rituals may involve Dora's encounters with Swiper, a bipedal, anthropomorphic masked thieving fox whose theft of the possessions of others must be prevented through interaction with the viewer. To stop Swiper, Dora and Boots must say "Swiper, no swiping" three times. However, on occasions where Swiper steals the belongings of other people, the viewer is presented with the challenge of helping Boots and Dora locate the stolen items. Another obstacle involves encounters with another one of the program's antagonists; the "Grumpy Old Troll" dwelling beneath a bridge that Dora and Boots must cross, who challenges them with a riddle that needs to be solved with the viewer's help before permitting them to pass. Known for its constant audience interaction depicted in every episode, the audience is usually presented to two primary landmarks (three in most double-length episodes, and four in "Dora in Troll Land") that must be passed before Dora can reach her destination, normally being challenged with games or puzzles along the way. The episode always ends with Dora successfully reaching the locale and singing the "We Did It!" song with Boots in triumph, followed by Dora and Boots discussing their favorite part of the trip.

== Development ==
In 1995, Chris Gifford, Valerie Walsh, and Eric Weiner began developing a television series titled The Knockarounds, about a group of forest animals led by a brave explorer rabbit. Gifford later explained, "Val had an idea for a treasure hunt show and I wanted to do an adventure show, so eventually we settled on a problem-solving show that would give kids tools to help them sort through all the things that come at them." The creators pitched The Knockarounds to Nickelodeon's president of film and TV entertainment Albie Hecht, who instead ordered a pilot for Janice Burgess' pitch Me and My Friends.

The three had often thought about making the lead raccoon a human, and ultimately decided make the change after The Knockarounds was rejected. Gifford, who had designed the raccoon after his daughter, changed the character to a girl of Irish descent named Nina, described by Weiner as "an ordinary girl who could solve any problem she encountered" and "a superhero by her persistence". The pitch was reworked under the name Nina's Pop-up Puzzle, and a pilot was produced.

In May 1998, Nickelodeon executive Brown Johnson attended the Children Now trade conference in Los Angeles. The organization unveiled a study titled "A Different World: Children's Perceptions of Race and Class in the Media", which stated that children of varying race strongly believed there weren't enough Latino or Asian characters on television, and more than two-thirds of the surveyed children believed it was important to see their race on TV. Upon Johnson's return, the creators were asked if they could include Hispanic elements in their series. At first there was hesitancy, but eventually they realized that they had "a great opportunity" and the character's design remained. Dora is a Latina; according to a Nickelodeon spokesman, "she was developed to be pan-Latina to represent the diversity of Latino cultures".

Each episode of the series costs $500,000. Development of the series came out of Nickelodeon's desire to "come up with the next big hit" similar to its other successful preschool shows at the time, Little Bear and Blue's Clues. The creators sought to combine the format of both shows, with the narrative focus of Little Bear combined with the interactivity of Blue's Clues. The creators further developed the concept by observing preschoolers with the creators coming to the conclusion that "they are little explorers." Nickelodeon originally did not want Swiper, the only remaining character from the Knockarounds pitch, as researchers stated he was "bad modeling and unsettling to kids". The creators felt strongly about the inclusion of the antagonist as an integral part of the series; he remained in the final show.

On numerous occasions, television specials have been aired for the series in which the usual events of regular episodes are altered, threatened, or replaced. Usually said specials will present Dora with a bigger, more whimsical adventure than usual or with a magical task that must be fulfilled, or perhaps even offer a series of different adventures for Boots and Dora to travel through. They might be presented with an unusual, difficult task (such as assisting Swiper in his attempts to be erased from Santa Claus's Naughty List) that normally is not featured in average episodes, or challenge Dora with a goal that must be achieved (such as the emancipation of a trapped mermaid). Sometimes, the specials have involved the debut of new characters, such as the birth of Dora's superpowered twin baby siblings and the introduction of the enchanted anthropomorphic stars that accompany Dora on many of her quests.

The show was renewed for a second season in November 2000, followed by a third season in late 2001.

On March 8, 2009, Mattel and Nickelodeon announced that Dora would receive a tweenage makeover, switching from a young age to a teenage attending middle school. Initially, it was announced that the new look would not be revealed until late 2009, but after a short controversy, the tween Dora was unveiled on March 16, 2009.

The series' seventh season, the first to air in high-definition, featured a new CGI opening sequence created by Chicago-based Calabash Animation and a revised visual style with more shading.

== Episodes ==
Season	Episodes	Originally released	
Season	Episodes	First released	Last released
Pilot		June 12, 1999	
1	25	August 14, 2000	October 29, 2001
2	26	February 13, 2002	July 14, 2003
3	21	October 6, 2003	June 14, 2004
4	27	September 24, 2004	August 5, 2008
5	21	September 15, 2008	October 1, 2010
6	18	November 5, 2010	February 3, 2012
7	19	March 16, 2012	January 16, 2013
8	20	March 18, 2013	August 9, 2019 (Note: The series officially ended on June 5, 2014. Six additional episodes subsequently aired in the United States from July 7 to August 9, 2019, to coincide with the release of Dora and the Lost City of Gold.)

== Voice cast ==
- Dora Márquez (aka Dora the Explorer): Kathleen Herles (2000–2007), Caitlin Sanchez (2008–2012), Fátima Ptacek (2012–2019)
- Boots: Harrison Chad (2000–2007), Regan Mizrahi (2008–2013), Koda Gursoy (2013–2019)
- Backpack: Sasha Toro (2000–2007), Alexandria Suarez (2008–2013), Sofia Lopez (2013–2019)
- Isa the Iguana: Ashley Fleming (2000–2007), Lenique Vincent (2008–2012), Skai Jackson (2012–2019)
- Tico the Squirrel: Muhammad Cunningham (2000–2001), Jose Zelaya (2002–2007), Jean Carlos Celi (2008–2012), Oscar Hutarra (2012–2019)
- Benny the Bull: Jake Burbage (2000–2007), Matt Gumley (2008–2012), Aidan Gemme (2012–2019)
- Diego Márquez: Felipe and Andre Dieppa (2003–2004), Gabriel Alvarez (2003–2006), Jake T. Austin (2005–2010), Brandon Zambrano (2011–2012), Jacob Medrano (2012–2019)
- Explorer Stars: Christiana Anbri, Henry Gifford, Katie Gifford, Aisha Shickler, Muhammed Cunningham, Jose Zeleya
- Val the Octopus, Miscalleneous: Elaine Del Valle
- Mrs. Márquez: Eileen Galindo
- Big Red Chicken, Grumpy Old Troll, Pirate Pig, Miscellaneous: Chris Gifford
- Various: K. J. Sanchez
- Boots' Father, Miscellaneous: Adam Sietz
- Señor Tucán, Miscellaneous: Leslie Valdes
- Map, Swiper, The Fiesta Trio: Marc Weiner

=== Guest voices ===
- John Leguizamo – Silly Mail Bird, Pirate Pig (Dora's Pirate Adventure) and Flying Monkeys
- Cheech Marin – King Juan el Bobo
- Ricardo Montalbán – El Encantador
- Esai Morales – Mr. Márquez
- Amy Principe – Little Star, various
- Irwin Reese – Singing Gate
- Antonia Rey – Abuela
- Paul Rodriguez – León the Circus Lion

=== Guest stars ===
- Chita Rivera (Dora's Fairytale Adventure, 2004; Dora Saves Fairytale Land, 2015)
- Richard Kind (Dora Saves the Crystal Kingdom, 2009)
- Johnny Weir (Dora's Ice Skating Spectacular, 2013)
- Hilary Duff (Dora's Ice Skating Spectacular, 2013)
- Jewel Kilcher (Dora in Wonderland, 2014)
- Mel Brooks (Dora in Wonderland, 2014)
- Alan Cumming (Dora in Wonderland, 2014)
- Sara Ramirez (Dora in Wonderland, 2014)
- Juanes (Dora Saves Fairytale Land, 2015)

== Foreign adaptations ==
Dora the Explorer has been produced in various other languages worldwide. It facilitates the learning of important foreign language words or phrases (mostly English), interspersed with a local language (e.g. Norwegian, Russian, Hindi, or German), with occasional use of Spanish (used in the Irish, Serbian, and Turkish versions) through its simplicity and use of repetition.

- Arabic: The Arabic language version is broadcast on the "Nickelodeon on MBC3" block of MBC 3, and is presented in Arabic-English.
- Bengali: The Bengali language version was first broadcast in 2015 on SA TV. The series began to be aired again in Bengali on Duronto TV on July 31, 2021.
- Cantonese: The Cantonese language version (Chinese: 愛探險的朵拉; lit. 'Explore-loving Dora') is broadcast in Hong Kong and presented in Cantonese-English.
- Danish: The Danish language version is called Dora – udforskeren and there are commands and expressions in English. It is broadcast on the national public children's channel, DR Ramasjang, and also on the Nick Jr. Channel through various pay TV providers.
- Dutch: The Dutch language version broadcasts on Nickelodeon and Nick. Jr, It is presented in Dutch-English. The voice actors are Lottie Hellingman as Dora and Dieter Jansen as Boots.
- French: The French language version, Dora l'exploratrice, broadcasts on TF1 in France and Télé-Québec in Canada. It is presented in French-English, with Dora and Boots (called Babouche) speaking French and other protagonists speaking and answering in English.
- Filipino: The Filipino language version broadcasts on ABS-CBN and has the same English title "Dora the Explorer". The characters speak Filipino and some English, Dora teaches English in this version.
- German: The German language version broadcasts on the German branch of Nick. Bilingualism is German-English.
- Greek: The Greek language version is called "Ντόρα η μικρή εξερευνήτρια" (or Dora the Little Explorer). It is broadcast on Nickelodeon and Star Channel. Bilingualism is Greek-English. Dora and Boots (called Botas) speak Greek and other protagonists speak and answer in English.
- Hebrew: The Hebrew language version broadcasts on HOP channel. Bilingualism is Hebrew-English. The series is called מגלים עם דורה (or Megalim Im Dora—English: Discovering with Dora).
- Hindi: In the Hindi language version, Dora and the other characters speak Hindi. It is broadcast on Nickelodeon and Nick Jr. Dora teaches the viewers English words and numbers.
- Hungarian: In the Hungarian language version, Dora and the other characters speak Hungarian with some English words or phrases. It is broadcast on Nickelodeon. The series is called Dóra a felfedező.
- Indonesian: The Indonesian language version broadcasts on Global TV. The bilingualism is Indonesian-English.
- Irish: The Irish language version broadcasts on the Irish station TG4. The bilingualism is Irish-Spanish with Dora and Boots speaking in Irish and some other characters speaking Spanish as in the original American version.
- Italian: The Italian language version broadcasts on Cartoonito and on Nickelodeon. Bilingualism is Italian-English. The series is called Dora l'esploratrice ("Dora the Explorer"). Most characters speak Italian, but some characters, especially Dora's parents and backpack, speak English alongside Italian.
- Japanese: The Japanese language version broadcasts on Nickelodeon. The bilingualism is Japanese-English, with Dora and Boots speaking Japanese and other protagonists speaking and answering in English. The version is called ドーラといっしょに大冒険 (Dōra to issho ni dai bōken/Adventures with Dora).
- Kannada: The Kannada language version broadcasts on Chintu TV and is a very popular program on that network. Hindi is the second language in this version.
- Korean: The Korean language version broadcasts on Nick Jr. in Korea. The title is Hi Dora and is introduced by a real person whose name is Dami – she introduces key English vocabulary for each episode. The episode is primarily in Korean with some English.
- Macedonian: The Macedonian language version broadcasts on MRT 1 in Macedonia. The title is "Дора истражува" (or Dora the Explorer). The bilingualism is Macedonian-English.
- Malay: The Malay language version broadcasts on TV9. The bilingualism is Malay-English. Dora speaks primarily in Malay, and the secondary language is English. The original English-Spanish version, however, is also available on Nickelodeon via the Nick Jr. programming slot to subscribers of the ASTRO satellite TV service.
- Malayalam: The Malayalam language version is called Dorayude Prayanam ("Dora's Journey") and broadcasts on Kochu TV, Sun TV Network.
- Mandarin: In the Mandarin Chinese language version Dora the characters speak mainly Mandarin with limited English. It is broadcast on Yo-yo TV in Taiwan (Channel 25).
- Maori: The Māori language version is called "Dora Mātātoa".
- Norwegian: In the Norwegian language version, the bilingualism is Norwegian-English.
- Polish: The Polish language version broadcasts on Nickelodeon in Poland. The bilingualism is Polish-English. The series is called Dora poznaje świat ("Dora explores the world").
- Portuguese: In the Portuguese language versions, Dora a Exploradora broadcasts on RTP2 and Nickelodeon. On Nickelodeon Brazil and TV Cultura, the show is called Dora a Aventureira, and Dora and Boots (called Boots in the Portuguese version and Botas in the Brazilian version) speak Portuguese. In contrast, the other protagonists speak and answer in English. Some Portuguese episodes are available on DVD.
- Russian: The Russian language version broadcasts on TNT and Nickelodeon. The bilingualism is Russian-English. The series is called Dasha-sledopyt ("Dasha the Pathfinder"). Dasha is the children's name of Daria (Darya).
- Serbian: The Serbian language version broadcasts on B92. The bilingualism is Serbian-Spanish. The series is called Dora istražuje (Dora is exploring).
- Spanish: There are different Spanish versions for Mexico, Latin America, and Spain. Dora la Exploradora broadcasts on Nickelodeon in Latin America. For Hispanic and Latino Americans, it aired on Telemundo from August 21, 2000, to September 30, 2001, as part of Nickelodeon en Telemundo, then again from October 2, 2004, to September 3, 2006, as part of Telemundo Kids. Over a year and a half later, it aired on Univisión from April 5, 2008, to May 24, 2014, as part of Planeta U. Dora and Boots (called Botas) speak Spanish and the other protagonists speak and answer in English. Some Spanish episodes are available to US viewers on VHS, and some DVDs have a Spanish track (including Dora's Egg Hunt). This version is entirely the reverse of the original English version; Tico and Señor Tucan (called Mr. Toucan) only speak English. Additionally, Univision has added on-screen captions of the Spanish words spoken in English. In Spain, Dora la exploradora is aired on TVE 1, Clan TVE and the Spanish and Portuguese Nickelodeon feed. It is another reverse of the original English version (the characters speak mainly Spanish but there are commands and expressions in English).
- Swedish: In the Swedish language version Dora- utforskaren the characters speak mainly Swedish but there are commands and expressions in English. It is broadcast on Nickelodeon and TV4.
- Tamil: In the Tamil language version Doravin Payanangal (டோராவின் பயணங்கள்), the characters all speak Tamil, with some English interspersed. It is broadcast on a local kids programming channel Chutti TV.
- Thai: In the Thai language version ดอร่าดิเอกซ์พลอเรอร์ or ดอร่าสาวน้อยนักผจญภัย, the characters speak Thai; however, Tico speaks English. It is broadcast on Gang Cartoon Channel, Nick Jr., Thai PBS.
- Turkish: In the Turkish language version Dora the characters speak mainly Turkish, Spanish, and English but there are commands and expressions in Turkish. It is broadcast on Nickelodeon and CNBC-e.

As shown in the list above, Spanish is the second language taught in the original English language version of the show (also broadcast for Malay speakers), in the Irish, Serbian, and trilingual Turkish versions, but for other versions of the show, the language being taught is English.

== Franchise ==
=== Animated successor series ===
==== Spin-off ====
Created and executive produced by Chris Gifford and Valerie Walsh Valdes, Go, Diego Go!, is a spin-off of the original series and follows Dora's cousin Diego, an eight-year-old boy whose adventures frequently involve rescuing animals and protecting their environment. The series aired for five seasons consisting of 80 episodes and ran from September 6, 2005 until July 13, 2013.

==== Sequel ====
In 2013, Nickelodeon announced a development of a sequel to Dora the Explorer titled Dora and Friends: Into the City! and would star Dora as a 10-year-old who goes on city adventures with the Explorer Girls (a group introduced in 2009 consisting of Naiya, Kate, Emma, and Alana) and is accompanied by a male friend named Pablo. The series ran for two seasons and 40 episodes on Nickelodeon from August 8, 2014, to February 5, 2017.

==== Reboot ====
In February 2022, an animated reboot series was announced. A promotional short film, Dora and the Fantastical Creatures, debuted in theaters before PAW Patrol: The Mighty Movie. The first trailer for the CG-animated series Dora was released in February 2024, and the series became available to stream on April 12, 2024.

=== Live-action film adaptation ===
On October 23, 2017, Paramount Pictures and Nickelodeon Movies announced a development of live-action film adaptation of the franchise at sister studio Paramount Players titled Dora and the Lost City of Gold for a scheduled summer 2019 release. It was filmed in Gold Coast, Queensland, Australia at Village Roadshow Studios and directed by James Bobin from a screenplay by Nicholas Stoller and Kristin Burr as producer. The film was expected to follow the title character as a teenager unlike the TV series with the inclusion of her cousin Diego. On May 2, 2018, Isabela Moner was announced to portray the titular character. The film was released in theaters/cinemas in the U.S. and Canada on August 9, 2019.

=== Live-action spin-off ===
On February 24, 2021, Paramount+ announced the development of a live-action series based on the franchise. The following February, while announcing the development of an animated reboot series, Paramount+ further clarified that the live-action series would be aimed at tweens and take inspiration from the live-action film, Dora and the Lost City of Gold.
