= Nick Jr. (disambiguation) =

Nick Jr. is an American morning programming block that airs on Nickelodeon.

Nick Jr. or Nickelodeon Junior may also refer to:

== Regional versions ==
- Nick Jr. (Sub-Saharan Africa)
- Nick Jr. (Middle East and North Africa)
- Nick Jr. (Australia & New Zealand)
- Nick Jr. (Russia)
- Nickelodeon Junior, the variant of Nick Jr. in France
- Nick Jr. (Germany)
- Nick Jr. (India)
- Nick Jr. (Italy)
- Nick Jr. (Latin America)
- Nick Jr. (Netherlands)
- Nick Jr. (Poland)
- Nick Jr. (Portugal)
- Nick Jr. (Scandinavia)
- Nick Jr. (Southeast Asia)
- Nick Jr. (UK & Ireland)

== Programming blocks ==
- Nick Jr. (Greek TV programming block)
- Nick Jr. on CBS, a defunct block
- Nick Jr., a block on Nickelodeon Canada

== See also ==
- Nick Jr. 2, a second Nick Jr. TV channel in the UK and Ireland
- Nick Jr. Channel, an American pay television channel that primarily targets preschoolers
