= Nickelodeon (Hungary) =

Hungarian children's television channel

Nickelodeon Hungary
- Logo used since August 1, 2023 (Note: The logo's wordmark has been in use since 2010. Additionally, there is a variant meant to be used for white backgrounds; the main variant has a white wordmark in conjunction with a fully orange splat.)
- Broadcast area: Hungary
- Headquarters: Budapest

Programming
- Language: Hungarian

Ownership
- Owner: Paramount Networks EMEAA (Skydance Corporation)
- Parent: Nickelodeon Group
- Sister channels: Nick Jr. Channel; Nicktoons; TeenNick; MTV; Comedy Central

History
- Launched: August 1, 1998 (block); January 2000 (Nickelodeon CEE channel)
- Closed: October 5, 1999 (block)

Links
- Website: Official website

Nickelodeon is a Hungarian channel that is aimed at children. The channel launched in January, 2000, based on a block that the channel M-Sat launched in 1998 version of the U.S. television channel of the same name. launched from Nickelodeon Hungary is served by the Nickelodeon CEE.

== History ==
It was originally launched as a short block on August 1, 1998 on the youth entertainment channel M-Sat. On April 25, 1999 it had expanded to 12 hours, starting at 7AM. After M-Sat closed on October 5, 1999, the block was so successful that MTV Networks Europe decided to make a 12-hour channel out of the block. Nickelodeon Hungary started in January, 2000 in the place of formerly M-Sat. From May 2004 to September 2012 was based on Nickelodeon Europe.

== Former logos ==
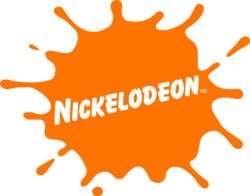
1998-2006	2006-2010	2010–2023
