= Nickelodeon (Scandinavia) =

Defunct Scandinavian children's television channel

- Final logo used from 1 August 2023 to 5 February 2026 (Note: The logo's wordmark had been in use since 2010. Additionally, there is a variant meant to be used for white backgrounds; the main variant has a white wordmark in conjunction with a fully orange splat.)
- Country: Denmark; Sweden; Norway; Finland
- Broadcast area: Denmark; Norway; Finland; Sweden

Programming
- Languages: English; Danish; Swedish; Norwegian; Finnish
- Picture format: SDTV 576i

Ownership
- Owner: Paramount Networks EMEAA
- Parent: Nickelodeon Group
- Sister channels: Nickelodeon Denmark; Nickelodeon Sweden; Nick Jr. Nicktoons

History
- Launched: 1 February 1997
- Closed: 5 February 2026
- Replaced by: Nickelodeon Global Unlimited

Links
- Website: nickelodeon.no (closed)

Nickelodeon was a children's television channel broadcasting in Denmark, Norway, Sweden and Finland. It broadcast programming from the American channel of the same name as well as some locally produced programmes.

== History ==
The channel started broadcasting in 1996, as a part of the analogue Viasat package, only broadcasting in the morning, sharing one transponder on Sirius 1 (previously Marcopolo 1) with ZTV and one on TV Sat 2 shared with 3+ and other Danish channels. The channel officially launched on 1 February 1997. Initially, the channel only broadcast for six hours between 7 a.m. and 1 p.m. It later changed to another transponder, allowing it to broadcast between 6 a.m. and 6 p.m.

Nickelodeon was launched as a free-to-air television channel in Sweden in 2001, and in Finland on 1 September 2007.

On 18 June 2008, a separate channel for Sweden was launched. Nickelodeon Sweden replaced the pan-Nordic channel in all of the country. However, the pan-Nordic continued to be available in Denmark, Finland and Norway.

A Danish version, Nickelodeon Denmark, was launched in March 2008. It was launched with VH1 Denmark, which aired Nickelodeon for six hours in the morning. The Pan-Nordic version remained available to Danish satellite viewers.

In 2011, the channel started broadcasting commercials in Norwegian, despite also being available in Denmark and Finland at the time.

On 7 January 2013, Viacom launched a Finnish version of Nick Jr. which replaced Nickelodeon Scandinavia on cable and in the terrestrial network. Nickelodeon Scandinavia continued to be available on satellite in Finland, as well as with a Finnish audio track on the pan-American Pluto TV channel Nickelodeon Totally Teen.

On 5 February 2026, Nickelodeon in Scandinavia transitioned into Nickelodeon Global Unlimited, having the same signal as Central Europe.

== Nickelodeon Denmark ==
Nickelodeon
- Logo used since 2023
- Country: Denmark; Finland; Norway; Sweden; Netherlands
- Broadcast area: Denmark; Finland; Norway; Sweden; Greenland
- Headquarters: Copenhagen, Denmark; Amsterdam, Netherlands

Programming
- Languages: Danish; Finnish; Norwegian; Swedish
- Picture format: 1080i HDTV 16:9 (downscaled to 576i for the SD feed)

Ownership
- Owner: Paramount Networks EMEAA
- Parent: Nickelodeon Group

History
- Launched: 1996 (as part of Nickelodeon Scandinavia); 15 March 2008 (as a separate feed)
- Closed: 5 February 2026
- Replaced by: Nickelodeon Global Unlimited

Links
- Website: nickelodeon.dk (closed)

The channel was launched on 15 March 2008 with the launch of VH1 Denmark, where it was broadcast between 6:00 am and 12:00 pm. From 1996 to 2008, Denmark was served by the pan-Nordic Nickelodeon Scandinavia. The Pan-Nordic channel continued to be available on satellite. VH1 separated from simulcasting Nickelodeon in early 2009, and the two channels had their own frequencies in analogue cable networks such as YouSee and Telia Stofa, where Nickelodeon became available between 6:00 am and 6:00 pm.

On 1 September 2009, the channel expanded its broadcasting hours, airing between 5:00 am and 7:00 pm. The channel became available on the digital terrestrial Boxer TV platform in November 2009. Nickelodeon was one of the least watched children's channels in Denmark in 2008, with a viewing share of 0.3 percent among children aged 3–11. It was surpassed by Disney Channel (15.7 percent share), Cartoon Network (12.0), Toon Disney (2.2), Jetix (2.1) and Playhouse Disney (2.1), with only Boomerang and Nickelodeon's satellite version having a smaller share of the children channels in Denmark.

== Nickelodeon Sweden ==
Nickelodeon
- Final logo used from 1 August 2023 to 5 February 2026
- Country: Sweden; Finland; Denmark; Norway
- Broadcast area: Sweden; Finland; Denmark; Norway

Programming
- Languages: Swedish; Finnish; Danish; Norwegian
- Picture format: 1080i HDTV

Ownership
- Owner: Paramount Networks EMEAA
- Parent: Nickelodeon Group

History
- Launched: 1996 (as Nickelodeon Scandinavia); 18 June 2008 (as Nickelodeon Sweden)
- Replaced: Nickelodeon Scandinavia
- Closed: 2021 (as Nickelodeon Sweden as an independent feed); 5 February 2026 (as Nickelodeon Scandinavia)
- Replaced by: Nickelodeon Global Unlimited

Availability

Terrestrial
- Boxer: Channel 30

Nickelodeon first became available in Sweden in 1996 when a pan-Scandinavian version was launched on the analogue Viasat platform. In 2001, it began broadcasting in the digital terrestrial television network. This pan-Scandinavian channel formerly broadcast between 6 a.m. and 6 p.m. when it started sharing a transponder with TV6 Nature/Action World in the late 1990s. In March 2008, Nickelodeon received a license to broadcast between 5 a.m. and 7 p.m. on the terrestrial network.

The daily schedule started with a Nick Jr. block for younger children with series such as Dora the Explorer, The Backyardigans and Paw Patrol. The channel also included a music video block called "Nick Hits". Cartoons for younger children were dubbed into Swedish. Live-action series aimed an older audience were broadcast with English with Swedish subtitles, but some were broadcast with Swedish dubbing.

On 18 June 2008, the dedicated Swedish version of Nickelodeon was launched with a separate schedule. The channel broadcast between 5 a.m. and 7 p.m. on most digital pay television platforms. Unlike the Pan-Scandinavian channel, which was broadcast from the UK, the Swedish version was broadcast from the Netherlands.

In September 2013, Nickelodeon Sweden started to use the idents from Nickelodeon USA and Nickelodeon UK and Ireland.

The channel began sharing the frequency space with Comedy Central Sweden when it launched in January 2009. The two channels became separate channel slots in November 2013. This allowed Nickelodeon Sweden to broadcast between 5 a.m. and 9 p.m. on most providers from 15 November.

Another hour was added to the broadcast day on 1 October 2015. After that, the channel would broadcast between 5 a.m. and 10 p.m.

The Nicktoon The Fairly OddParents was broadcast on Disney Channel and Nickelodeon in Sweden.

On 5 February 2026, Nickelodeon in Sweden (along with Scandinavia) transitioned into Nickelodeon Global Unlimited, having the same signal as Central Europe.

== Broadcast ==
Most cartoons were dubbed into local languages, and separate audio tracks were available on satellite. Live-action series aimed an older audience were broadcast in English with local subtitles.

The limited broadcasting hours meant that the channel usually shared bandwidth with other channels who would broadcast in the evening and the night. On Viasat, it formerly broadcast on the same channel as Viasat Nature, Viasat Crime and Playboy TV, but this was changed in 2007, when Viasat Nature started broadcasting in the day and Nickelodeon began timesharing with VH1. Many cable systems used the Viasat feed.

On Canal Digital, the European version of VH1 Classic was broadcast during Nickelodeon's off-air hours, and on Swedish DTT (Boxer). Star! was formerly shown during the same time.

The channel was previously broadcast from the United Kingdom, but in 2008, it revoked its UK license and started broadcasting from the Netherlands.
