= Sister station =

Broadcast stations of the same company

In broadcasting, sister stations or sister channels are radio or television stations operated by the same company, either by direct ownership or through a management agreement.

Radio sister stations will often have different formats, and sometimes one station is on the AM band while another is on the FM band. Conversely, several types of sister-station relationships exist in television; stations in the same city will usually be affiliated with different television networks (often one with a major network and the other with a secondary network), and may occasionally shift television programs between each other when local events require one station to interrupt its network feed.

Sister stations in separate (but often nearby) cities owned by the same company may or may not share a network affiliation. For example, WNYW and WWOR-TV, in New York City and Secaucus, New Jersey, are both owned by Fox Corporation. WNYW is a Fox owned-and-operated station; WWOR-TV is a MyNetworkTV owned-and-operated station. WPSG in Philadelphia and KBCW in San Francisco were the flagship stations of The CW until 2023 and are owned by CBS Television Stations. In addition, stations in different cities affiliated with the same network, but not sharing an ownership tie, may refer to each other informally as sister stations.

Sister networks or sister channels, in many cases, are cable or satellite channels which are launched to either broadcast series which either premiered on the main network but has been moved out of the higher-priority schedule (such as TV Land or Boomerang), fulfill a specific niche of content which would not be fulfilled on the main network (such as the Nick Jr. Channel or Nicktoons) or broadcast to a wider audience than the main network (such as CNN International or Al Jazeera English). However, in other cases, these cable or satellite channels may only share common ownership.

The establishment and proliferation of sister networks on cable, satellite and internet providers has become easier and more commercially profitable over the history of such media venues.

== See also ==
- Concentration of media ownership
- Parent company
