= Nickelodeon (Ukrainian TV programming block) =

Ukrainian programing block and television channel

- Country: Ukraine
- Broadcast area: Ukraine; Germany; Poland; Belgium; Netherlands; Spain; Czech Republic

Programming
- Language: Ukrainian

Ownership
- Owner: Paramount Networks EMEAA
- Parent: Nickelodeon Group

History
- Launched: 22 February 2010 (QTV block); 5 November 2003 (Pan-European channel); 1 April 2022 (Pluto TV channel); 1 June 2023 (Global)
- Closed: 31 August 2017 (QTV block); 30 June 2023 (Pluto TV channel); 1 January 2026 (Global)
- Replaced by: Nickelodeon Global (in Ukraine)

Nickelodeon Ukraine (Ukrainian; Нікелодеон Україна) was a Ukrainian language television channel and a programming block on QTV and channel on Pluto TV and on the Global feed.

== History ==
Nickelodeon started in Ukraine in 22 February 2010 as a programming block on the Ukrainian channel QTV.

On 5 November 2003, a Ukrainian version of the channel was launched in Russian using the Pan-European feed.

On 31 August 2017, the Ukrainian-language Nickelodeon block ended after the closure of QTV.

On 1 June 2023, 1+1 Media Group and Paramount Global announced that Nickelodeon had become available for viewers to watch in Ukrainian, after a Ukrainian audio track was added to Nickelodeon Global.

On 1 January 2026, the Nickelodeon Global feed closed in Ukraine along with Nick Jr. and Nicktoons channels in the region.

== Pluto TV channel ==
On 1 April 2022, during the Russian invasion of Ukraine, Nickelodeon Ukraine returned as a pop-up channel for Poland, Germany and Spain on Pluto TV. As for Spain and Portugal, users could watch the channel using Pluto TV, and other television services such as Movistar Plus+, Vodafone TV or Meo.

Due to the launch of a Ukrainian audio track to Nickelodeon CEE, Nickelodeon Ukraine on Pluto TV closed on 30 June 2023.
