= MTV (Portugal) =

Portuguese television channel (2003–2026)

- Logo used from 2021 to 2026
- Country: Portugal
- Broadcast area: Portugal; Angola; Mozambique
- Headquarters: Lisbon, Portugal

Programming
- Picture format: 1080i HDTV (downscaled to 16:9 576i for the SDTV feed)

Ownership
- Owner: Paramount Networks EMEAA
- Sister channels: Nickelodeon; Nick Jr.

History
- Launched: 4 July 2003; 23 years ago
- Replaced: MTV Europe
- Closed: 23 March 2026; 7 months ago
- Replaced by: MTV Global

Links
- Website: mtv.pt (inactive)

MTV was a Portuguese pay television channel that was launched on 4 July 2003, replacing MTV Europe in Portugal. A high-definition simulcast feed of the channel launched on 17 June 2015. In 2004, the channel targeted a 15–25 age group, and at the time, it was the twelfth most-watched channel on pay television platforms in Portugal. Between 2003 and 2025, the channel also had a music component.

When it launched, MTV Portugal shared similar content to MTV Spain and MTV Italy, while also airing programming from MTV US and MTV Europe (now MTV Global). The channel initially focused on music content but gradually the channel began to air reality shows similar to other MTV channels. The channel was launched in Portugal with the support of private broadcaster SIC as it previously had a MTV branded block in the early 1990s. The channel was based at MTV Networks Europe in Madrid and supported by a local office is Lisbon.

== History ==
MTV Portugal was launched at midnight on 4 July 2003, with a pre-recorded concert special by Blind Zero, replacing MTV Europe. The channel promised a "Portugalization" of its content, when, at launch, the channel had Portuguese staff, but no local programs aired.

At the beginning, the channel broadcast mainly music, but eventually shifted to reality shows. Most of its programming consisted of shows broadcast on MTV channels in the US (MTV and MTV2), along with shows from MTV UK (Geordie Shore, Just Tattoo of Us), MTV Spain (Gandía Shore), MTV Brazil and MTV Latin America.

In spring 2011, MTV Portugal began to air localised programming. The last MTV Portugal VJs were Diogo Dias, (the first presenter of the channel, having hosted MTV Portugal since 2004), Luís Marvão and Patrícia Vieira. Starting in the early 2020s, MTV Portugal discontinued its presenting roles. Several Portuguese celebrities were also MTV Portugal VJs, Filomena Cautela, Luísa Barbosa (in the mid-2000s) and Ana Sofia Martins (in the early 2010s).

In the 2020s, its dedicated music programming was progressively reduced, until in early 2026, music videos were completely eradicated from the channel's broadcast (similar to other MTV channels in Europe), and incorporated into MTV Global's global programming.

By 2024, MTV Portugal's schedule was merged into MTV Spain's, but still had localized content.

With the merger into MTV Global in 2025, Czech regulator RRTV requested that the former MTV Portugal license would be reused for MTV Poland's, and, consequently, the channel would be distributed from the Thor satellite instead.

Initially, MTV Portugal was available on Optimus Clix, which merged with ZON into NOS in 2014. The channel was also available on Nowo, until the channel was removed on 15 February 2021. On 31 December 2025, MTV Portugal was withdrawn from MEO, the operator which was the Portuguese subscription television service with the largest number of clients in 2023.

The MTV music channels in Portugal (such as MTV 00s and MTV Live) were closed on 31 December 2025, and MTV Portugal started using the same schedule as MTV Global, and discontinued airing music videos. The channel continued to be available on the NOS and Vodafone Portugal operators.

In March 2026, its feed was delocalized and moved to MTV Global with Portuguese subtitles and promotion announcer.

== VJ casting ==
In 2012, MTV Portugal aired a local television program which searched for new VJs across the country. It began its search by going across the country to ten cities across six months and selecting its top candidates to progress to the next stage. During the VJ casting process it visited Almada, Aveiro, Coimbra, Faro, Funchal, Guimarães, Lisbon, Montijo, Sintra, Viseu.

== Local programmes ==
- MTV Amplifica (entertainment news update hosted by VJ Diogo)
- MTV Breakfast Club (entertainment show hosted by VJ Patrícia and VJ Luís)
- MTV News (available on MTV Portugal's Instagram)
- MTV Hits (nonstop video show)
- MTV Push Portugal
- MTV Insomnia (nonstop video show)

== Programs ==
- 40 Greatest Pranks
- Acapulco Shore
- Amplifica
- Are You the One?
- Are You the One? Brazil
- Awkward
- Brothers Green: Eats
- Car Crash Couples
- Catfish: The TV Show
- The Challenge
- Daria
- Ex on the Beach
- Faking It
- Geordie Shore
- The Hills
- I Used to Be Fat
- Lip Sync Battle
- Made
- MTV #YouGotGot
- MTV Breakfast Club
- MTV Cribs
- MTV Dance Videos
- MTV Drive Time by Smart
- MTV Insomnia
- MTV It Girls
- MTV Movie Awards
- MTV Push
- MTV Retro
- MTV Summer Sessions
- MTV Sunset Braga
- MTV Suspect
- MTV Video Music Award
- MTV World Stage
- MTV's Bugging Out
- Pimp My Ride
- Pranked
- Punk'd
- The Ride
- Ridiculousness
- South Park
- Super Shore
- Teen Mom
- Thalia's Mixtape: El Soundtrack de Mi Vida
- Video Love
- Happy Tree Friends
- 16 and Pregnant
- America's Best Dance Crew
- Amplifica
- Beavis and Butt-head
- Blue Mountain State
- Bored to Death
- Bullied
- Caged
- Crash Canyon
- Dance Floor Chart
- Death Valley
- Degrassi: The Next Generation
- DISconnected
- Drawn Together
- Eastbound & Down
- Flash Prank
- From G's to Gents
- How to Make It in America
- Important Things with Demetri Martin
- Inbetweeners
- Instant Star
- Jersey Shore
- MTV U
- MTV Unplugged
- My Life as Liz
- My Super Sweet 16
- Na Cozinha
- Paris Hilton's My New BFF
- Peak Season
- Room Raiders
- Skins
- Soul Eater
- Taking the Stage
- The Buried Life
- The Challenge: Battle of the Exes
- The City
- The Osbournes
- The Pauly D Project
- The Real World
- The Sarah Silverman Program
- Top 10: O Teu Top
- Tosh.0
- Tough Love
- True Beauty
- True Life

=== Awards ceremonies on MTV Portugal ===
MTV Portugal broadcast live every edition of the MTV Europe Music Awards (EMA) between 2003 and its last edition in 2024, as well as the MTV Movie Awards.

It also broadcast live all editions of the MTV Video Music Awards (VMA) between 2003 and 2024, except for the 2010 edition, which, for unknown reasons, was not broadcast live, and the 2025 edition, which was also not broadcast on other European MTV channels. The 2011 edition aired with a half-hour delay. The delayed broadcast of the 2025 VMAs aired without Portuguese subtitles.

The 2007 edition of Los Premios MTV, the awards show for Spanish-speaking America, also aired on MTV Portugal.
