= Nickelodeon (Walloon TV channel) =

French Belgian version of Nickelodeon

- Country: Belgium
- Broadcast area: Belgium; Luxembourg

Programming
- Language: French
- Picture format: 576i, 1080i

Ownership
- Owner: Paramount Networks EMEAA
- Parent: Nickelodeon Group
- Sister channels: Nick Jr. Wallonia; MTV Wallonia

History
- Launched: 14 July 2006; 20 years ago (timesharing with MTV); 4 October 2011; 14 years ago (independent channel)

Links
- Website: Official website

Nickelodeon Wallonia is a Belgian pay television channel, working as the local variant of US kids network Nickelodeon in that country. The network has two sister networks, Nick Jr. Wallonia and MTV Wallonia.

== History ==
The Walloon variant of Nickelodeon was officially launched on 14 July 2006, sharing its analog feed with MTV Wallonia's. It gains revenue through advertisement and product sells. According to the Centre d'Information sur les Médias, Nickelodeon Wallonia was the most watched channel among kids aged 4 and up. During this time, the channel premiered new shows such as SpongeBob SquarePants and Avatar: the Last Airbender.

A Nick Jr. channel in French was launched in digital television on 28 August 2009.

In 2010, Nickelodeon Wallonia adopted the new US logo and rebranded its graphical package. In 2011, it switched its aspect ratio from 4:3 to 16:9. In 2014, Nickelodeon Wallonia premiered Rabbids Invasion, an original series of the channel, which premiered earlier that year on Nickelodeon France.

Nickelodeon timeshared with MTV, airing between 6am to 6pm. Nickelodeon and MTV were split in two 24h channels on digital platforms on 4 October 2011.

In 2019, Nickelodeon is the 1st kids channel in Southern Belgium with 15,66% share for the 4–14 years old range, in front of Disney Junior, Disney Channel, Cartoon Network and Studio 100 TV. All ages combined, Nickelodeon is ranked 11th regionally with a 1,29% share, behind the free-to-air state-owned La Trois with 1,36% who air the kids block Ouftivi all day.

As of April 6, 2020, the channel operates as an alternate video and audio track to Nickelodeon Commercial Light. Both channels' schedule are the same and operate under the same licence.
