= Nickelodeon (Polish TV channel) =

Polish television channel

Nickelodeon Poland
- Logo used since 1 August 2023 (Note: The logo's wordmark has been in use since 1 March 2010. Additionally, there is a variant meant to be used for white backgrounds; the main variant has a white wordmark in conjunction with a fully orange splat.)
- Country: Poland

Programming
- Languages: Polish; English (via Paramount+); Ukrainian; Russian (2010-2012); Turkish (2012)
- Picture format: 1080i (16:9 HDTV)

Ownership
- Owner: Paramount Networks EMEAA (Skydance Corporation)
- Parent: Nickelodeon Group
- Sister channels: Nick Jr. Nicktoons; TeenNick; MTV; Comedy Central

History
- Launched: 7 November 1999 (block); 10 July 2008 (channel)
- Closed: 1 July 2001 (block)

Links
- Website: Official website

Availability

Terrestrial
- Polish digital: TV Mobilna - MUX 4 (pay) - until November 2022

Streaming media
- Paramount+

Nickelodeon Poland (Polish: Nickelodeon Polska), also simply called Nick Poland, is a children's channel broadcasting in Poland. The channel broadcasts 24/7. All animated shows are dubbed into Polish and live-action Polish lector its from Nickelodeon's original namesake American channel.

== History ==
=== Start as a programming block on Fantastic (1999-2001) ===
Before the Polish Nickelodeon channel, Nickelodeon aired as a 12-hour block on Fantastic from 1999 to 2001 but was closed after being deemed a failure on 11 september 2001.

In 2000, the programme "ME-TV" began to be published, it was developed by Nickelodeon Russia specifically for Poland.

=== Channel (2008-present) ===
On 10 July 2008, Nickelodeon returned to Poland as a full-time channel. On 1 March 2010, Nickelodeon Poland changed its logo and switched to Nickelodeon CEE. On 2 October 2012, Nickelodeon CEE again became Nickelodeon Poland. On 9 November 2021, Nickelodeon Poland started to broadcast on czech license, but have a few opt-outs, including nighttime Rodzina Zastępcza (Foster Family) marathons between 23:00-5:00 CET, and weekday events between 20:05-22:20 CET, in which Nick air Kally's Mashup (Zmiksowanej Kally), followed by Henry Danger (Niebezpieczny Henryk) and two episodes of The Loud House (Harmidom; which are shown on main feed between 21:00-21:55 CET).

on April 17, 2021, Nickelodeon Poland switched once again to Nickelodeon CEE.

From June 1, 2023, the channel began using automatic subtitles in the promotion of programs, and also added Ukrainian language on this channel, in connection with the closing of the Pluto TV channel.

On August 1, 2023, the channel rebranded, which included an updated version of the logo and a new design.

== Controversy ==
On 6 June 2018, several episodes of The Loud House were banned from airing due to the complaint submitted to the Polish National Broadcasting Council by Ordo Iuris, a notable Catholic law office, about the LGBT themes presented in the series, but are still available on streaming platforms such as SkyShowtime.
