= Eurotroll =

Swedish dubbing company

- Industry: Dubbing
- Founded: 1992
- Headquarters: Stockholm, Sweden
- Key people: Lasse Svensson
- Website: Eurotroll

Eurotroll is a Swedish dubbing company based in Stockholm, the capital of Sweden. The company dubs content into a Swedish, Danish, Finnish, and Norwegian. The company is one of the few independent dubbing companies in Scandinavia. The company was founded in 1993 by Lasse Svensson. Before he founded Eurotroll, he was president of another dubbing named Media Dubb, which is unrelated to Eurotroll. The company dubs animation and videogames.

== Clients ==
- Cartoon Network
- Sveriges Television
- Nickelodeon (Sweden)
- Warner Bros.
- TV4 (Sweden)
- AB Svensk Filmindustri
- United International Pictures
- Taffy Entertainment
- Bonnier Audio
- 20th Century Fox
- TV-Loonland
- and more

== Filmography ==
=== Films and programs ===
- Bob the Builder
- SpongeBob SquarePants
- DuckTales
- Postman Pat
- Chuggington
- Jimmy Neutron: Boy Genius
- Kiki's Delivery Service
- Het Huis Anubis
- Rugrats Go Wild
- Tom and Jerry: The Magic Ring
- Tom and Jerry: The Movie
- The SpongeBob SquarePants Movie
- Pokémon: The First Movie
- Curious George 2: Follow That Monkey!
- Batman: The Animated Series
- Garfield and Friends
- and a lot more

=== Video games ===
- Resistance 2

== See also ==
- SDI Media Sweden
- Dubberman Sweden AB
