= Nick Jr. (Scandinavia) =

Swedish television channel

- Broadcast area: List: Denmark; Estonia; Faroe Islands; Finland; Iceland; Latvia; Lithuania; Norway; Sweden

Programming
- Language: List: Danish; English; Estonian; Finnish; Latvian; Lithuanian; Norwegian; Russian; Swedish

Ownership
- Owner: Paramount Networks EMEAA (Skydance Corporation)
- Parent: Nickelodeon Group
- Sister channels: Nickelodeon, Nicktoons, MTV, Comedy Central

History
- Launched: 1 September 2010; 16 years ago

Links
- Website: nickjr.tv

Nick Jr. is a Scandinavian television channel targeting preschoolers.

Viasat announced the launch of Nick Jr. on 25 May 2010. It launched on 1 September 2010. Viasat and Tele2 TV were broadcasting the channel from the start. Canal Digital added the channel on 7 January 2013.

Nick Jr. became MTV Networks' fourth dedicated Swedish channel, after MTV, Nickelodeon and Comedy Central.
