= Nickelodeon (Turkish TV channel) =

- The current logo used since 1 August 2023 (Note: The logo's wordmark has been in use since 31 March 2010. Additionally, there is a variant meant to be used for white backgrounds; the main variant has a white wordmark in conjunction with a fully orange splat.)
- Country: Turkey
- Broadcast area: Turkey; Northern Cyprus

Programming
- Languages: Turkish; English

Ownership
- Owner: Skydance Corporation; Dijimedya Grup
- Parent: Nickelodeon Group
- Sister channels: Nick Jr. Channel; Nicktoons Global; MTV Europe; Nickelodeon HD; MTV Hits (Europe)

History
- Launched: 10 December 1997; 28 years ago (original); February 2012; 14 years ago (relaunch)
- Closed: 31 August 2011; 15 years ago (original)

Availability

Terrestrial
- Digiturk 172. Channel (SD); 173. Channel (HD)

Nickelodeon is a Turkish pay television channel operated by Paramount Network EMEAA. which launched on 10 December 1997. It is based on the original United States channel.

== History ==
Nickelodeon was announced in August 1997 as a joint-venture with Medya Grubu and launched on 10 December 1997 on cable by Turkish company RTV and timeshared with Discovery Channel Turkey. Nickelodeon aired from 7am to 7pm. Local production was set to start only six months after the channel's launch.

In 2001, Multi Channel Developers took over Nickelodeon's license, thus making it a 24-hour channel.

On 31 March 2010, Nickelodeon had a major rebrand with new idents and a new logo.

On 22 May 2010, Nickelodeon and MTV Turkey were taken off of Digiturk, most likely due to disagreement issues.

On 2 June 2010, Nickelodeon and MTV Turkey's websites were shut down, due to an argument between MCD and Viacom.

On 31 August 2011, Viacom ended MCD's license of the two channels, thus getting the local channels shut down. Nickelodeon and MTV Europe later started broadcasting in English on D-Smart.

In February 2012, Viacom reached an agreement with Digiturk and brought back Nickelodeon and MTV to Turkey. Starting on 1 March 2012, Nickelodeon still broadcasts in Turkish today and starting with Polish version, while MTV has Turkish subtitles over the European feed.

On 1 May 2012, the Nick Jr. channel came to Turkey and mainly broadcasts preschooler shows for young kids aged 2–8 and is a 24-hour kid's channel much like Nickelodeon.

On 1 July 2012, Nickelodeon HD launched. It became Turkey's first HD kids channel.

In October 2012, the channel separated from the Polish version.

In Summer 2018, Nickelodeon Turkey is starting with the CEE feed, using the Hungarian version. Later In 2019, Nickelodeon Turkey now uses the Romanian version.
