= Nickelodeon (CIS and Baltics) =

Russian-language children's television channel

- Country: United Kingdom
- Broadcast area: CIS (except Russia and Belarus); Georgia; Estonia; Latvia; Lithuania
- Headquarters: London, United Kingdom

Programming
- Languages: Russian, English, Kazakh, Estonian, Latvian, Lithuanian
- Picture format: 16:9 576i SDTV

Ownership
- Owner: Paramount Networks EMEAA
- Parent: Nickelodeon Group
- Sister channels: Nick Jr., Nicktoons, MTV Russia, Paramount Comedy, Paramount Channel

History
- Launched: 15 November 1998; 27 years ago
- Closed: 28 April 2022; 4 years ago (Russia); 14 December 2022; 3 years ago (Belarus); 1 January 2026; 9 months ago (Ukraine)

Links
- Website: https://www.nickelodeon.ru/ Now official site redirects to Nickelodeon Global

Availability in Russia before 28.04.2022

Terrestrial
- Wink: Channel 301 (Before 28.04.2022)
- MTS: Channel 094 (Before 28.04.2022)

Nickelodeon is a Russian-language children's television channel launched on November 15, 1998, across the post-Soviet states. Localised version of the American television channel Nickelodeon. On April 28, 2022, the channel stopped serving Russia, but meanwhile the Russian broadcast continues in neighboring countries.

== History ==
=== 1993–1998 ===
On September 1, 1993, Nickelodeon UK began broadcasting in Europe and the western part of Russia from the Astra 1C and Astra 1B satellites. Broadcasting was from 9:00 to 22:00 MSK. Since 1996, Nickelodeon UK has broadcast from the Sirius satellite for the western and north-western part of Russia.

=== 1998–present ===
On September 16, 1998, Nickelodeon International signed an agreement with Metromedia International Group. MIG was engaged in localization of the channel into Russian, the editorial office was located on 2nd Brestskaya Street, in house No. 43 in Moscow. The presentation of the channel in the newspaper media and some Moscow schools also began.

On November 15, 1998, Nickelodeon Russia began broadcasting around the clock in the CIS and Baltic countries, having two audio tracks broadcasting languages (Russian and English). Dubbing was done in Moscow. Initially, cassettes with recordings were sent to Moscow, after which the material was dubbed, and the cassettes were returned to London, from there broadcasting was still going on. In the same year, three thematic blocks premiered: Nicktoons, Nick at Nite, and Nick Jr. According to statistics from June 1999, the channel was already received by 30,000 households in the cable networks of Arkhangelsk.

In 2000, the educational program ME TV premiered, which told about the cultural and national traditions of the CIS and Baltic countries. The Moscow office also developed a program for Poland.

In 2001, a website was launched, Nickelodeon.ru. In 2002, two more new blocks premiered: "Nick Films" and "Toons on toast". In 2003, the channel began broadcasting on the territory of Ukraine. In September 2003, MTV Networks International signed an agreement with EMC, the new distributor continued to localize and adapt the channel.

In May 2004, the channel was delocalized and replaced by Nickelodeon Europe. Now broadcasting was carried out throughout Eastern Europe, and a Hungarian soundtrack was also added. In 2006, Media Broadcasting Group became the distributor of the channel in the CIS. Also in 2006, two new blocks "Nick Zone" and "Nick Double" premiered, which offered additional animated series.

From 2008 to 2012, the channel periodically experienced failures on the air, including with an audiotrack, as a result of which animated series in Polish and English were released for some time period.

In the early 2010s, Paramount Pictures films and a small portion of Nickelodeon animated series appeared on the ivi online cinema. In 2019, Paramount entered into a major deal with ivi, Kinopoisk, MEGOGO, and tvzavr to add Nickelodeon content and to broadcast its own channels.

On March 1, 2010, a new corporate identity and logo were introduced, as well as a new design. In the same year, the broadcasting center moved from Warsaw and London to Prague, but Warsaw and London were responsible for programming and controlling the channel.

At the beginning of 2011, a representative office of Viacom opened in Russia, which began distributing the local version of the channel. On September 17, 2011, Nickelodeon switched to 16:9 widescreen broadcasting. On October 4, 2011, Nickelodeon Europe switched to HD format. This HD channel in some countries, including the CIS, is referred to as Nickelodeon HD. After that, it began broadcasting as the main channel of Nickelodeon Poland with a Russian soundtrack, this version was also delocalized for international broadcasting, Amsterdam took over programming of the channel.

In October 2012, the channel separated from the Polish version and was localized again, and its own set of programs also aired. For some time, the broadcast continued to go from Warsaw and Prague, later moved to London.

In 2013, the blocks "Family Friday" and "Old School" aired, consisting of classic animated series of the television channel.

In 2014, Nickelodeon and the Aeroplane production company signed a license agreement for the animated series The Fixies, under which the channel had broadcast an animated series for preschoolers for two years starting in January 2015.

Starting on January 1, 2015, the channel began broadcasting without advertising. In the summer of 2015, their updated website was presented, the audience of the site exceeded 650,000 unique users for the second quarter of 2015. In 2015, MEGOGO acquired the rights to Paramount Pictures films for all 15 countries of the former union, and a year later, Nickelodeon content was added to the service. In 2016, the block "Sunday Block Premier" aired.

In 2017, Moscow took over programming of Nickelodeon, but broadcasting continued from Warsaw and London. Also, audio tracks in Lithuanian, Latvian and Estonian were added for the Baltic countries.

At the beginning of 2020, Okko and ViacomCBS Networks Russia signed a deal under which the online cinema received the rights to the content of the Nickelodeon, Nick Jr, Comedy Central, Channel 5 and MTV brands. On June 1, 2020, Paramount+ was launched in the Okko service. On June 1, 2021, a similar service was launched in ivi, but under the name Paramount Play.

On April 1, 2022, the Nickelodeon Ukraine television channel began broadcasting in Poland and Germany, previously this channel broadcast on the streaming service Pluto TV. On April 5, 2022, a Kazakh audio track was added for Kazakhstan. On the territory of Ukraine, at the same time, the Russian-language version of the channel continued to broadcast on cable and satellite networks. The channel closed in Russia on April 28 of that year while airing an episode of Rugrats due to Paramount shutting down operations in that country in response to the Russian-Ukraine War. In the Commonwealth of Independent States (CIS), as well as Georgia, Ukraine the broadcasting of Russian-language versions of MTV and other Paramount channels continued until December 14.

After leaving Russia, Nickelodeon, along with other Paramount channels, continued to broadcast in Russian in the post-Soviet space. On April 20, 2022, Nickelodeon, while still in Russia, stopped indicating Moscow time in its promotional videos; instead, the times of Almaty, Tbilisi, and Chisinau began to be shown. The company continued to license its content to some Russian online cinemas for distribution in the CIS countries (except Russia and Belarus). The company also licenses local streaming services: for example, in the Baltic states, Go3 has been receiving the content since 2021.

In the summer of 2022, Nickelodeon Ukraine reached Ukraine as well, appearing on the MEGOGO and Sweet TV services, but Nickelodeon Russia continued to broadcast on cable and satellite networks.

On September 7, 2022, the TV channel's website stopped working; later, on December 5 of the same year, the website resumed operation under a different address - relaunch.www.nickelodeon.ru. On September 30, 2023, the website stopped working again.

From December 14, 2022, the broadcasting of Nickelodeon and affiliated channels in Belarus were closed. On the same day, the channel was closed and replaced by Nickelodeon Global (except Belarus) with saving Russian audio track.

At the end of 2024, when adjusting the budget, Kazakhstan excluded the expense item for translating popular children’s TV channels into Kazakh. From the end of 2025, some of the new programs began to be released without a Kazakh translation.

From 2025 to 2026, Paramount has reorganized the pan‑European versions of Nickelodeon: the CIS countries have been transferred to Nickelodeon Global Limited (formerly Nick Asia), and the Baltic states were transferred to Nickelodeon Global Unlimited. The first channel has censorship in its programs, and the second channel does not.

On January 1, 2026, the channel closed in Ukraine along with Nick Jr. and Nicktoons channels in the region.

== Censorship ==
Episodes of The Loud House featuring Howard and Harold McBride, Luna, Sam, Lainey and Alice were removed from broadcast due to the nation's domestic anti-gay propaganda law.

== See also ==
- Nickelodeon
