= Nickelodeon Group =

Children's entertainment division of Skydance TV

Nickelodeon Group Nickelodeon Networks Inc. Paramount Kids & Family Group
- Logo used since 2023 (Note: The logo's wordmark has been in use since September 28, 2009. Additionally, this logo is a variant meant to be used for white backgrounds; the main variant has a white wordmark in conjunction with a fully orange splat.)
- Type: Division
- Industry: Entertainment
- Founded: May 1, 2002; 24 years ago
- Headquarters: 1515 Broadway, New York City, U.S.
- Key people: Michael Ouweleen (president)
- Products: Pay television; Television production
- Brands: Nickelodeon; Nick Jr.; Nick at Nite; Noggin; Nicktoons; TeenNick; NickMusic
- Parent: Skydance Global Cable Media
- Website: nick.com (Redirects to country/territory website outside the U.S. no longer in some countries; it redirects to Nick Global)

The Nickelodeon Group, also known as Nickelodeon Networks Inc., is the children's and family entertainment division of the TV division of Skydance that oversees the operations of cable television channel Nickelodeon and its derivative channels and services. It was created in 2002.

== History ==
=== 2002–2009 ===
Nickelodeon Group was founded in 2002 after MTV Networks merged the business operations of Nickelodeon, Nick at Nite, and Nicktoons into a single division.

On January 4, 2006, Herb Scannell resigned from Nickelodeon. Cyma Zarghami was appointed in his place as president of the newly formed Kids & Family Group, which included Nickelodeon, Nick at Nite, Noggin, The N, Nicktoons Network, TV Land, CMT and CMT Pure Country.

In 2007, Nickelodeon entered into a four-year development deal with Sony Music to produce music-themed TV shows for the network, to help fund and launch tie-in albums, and to produce original soundtrack songs that could be released as singles. The Naked Brothers Band, a rock-mockumentary series of a pre-teenage rock band led by two real-life brothers who write and perform the songs, ran from 2007 to 2009; it was successful for children in the 6–11 age group. By February 2007, the band's song "Crazy Car" had appeared on the Billboard Hot 100, and the soundtrack albums from the first two seasons, each of which was signed to Sony Music's own Columbia Records, appeared on the Billboard 200. The only greenlit series produced under the Sony Music partnership, Victorious, ran from 2010 to 2013. A similar hit music-themed sitcom Big Time Rush ran from 2009 to 2013, and featured a similar partnership with Columbia Records; however, Columbia was only involved with the show's music, and Sony Music became involved with the series' production midway through its first season. It became Nickelodeon's second-most successful live-action show of all time after iCarly; the Big Time Rush episode "Big Time School of Rocque" was viewed by 6.8 million viewers for its premiere on January 18, 2010, setting a new record as the highest-rated live-action series premiere in the channel's history.

=== 2009–present ===
On February 1, 2009, Nickelodeon discontinued the TEENick block, as the name would soon be used for its own channel.

On July 29, 2009, Nickelodeon unveiled a new logo that would be implemented toward the end of the year, designed by New York City–based creative director/designer Eric Zim. It was part of a year dedicated to strengthening the brand's identity. The logo was intended to create a unified look that can better be conveyed across all of MTV Networks' children's channels. The new logo debuted on September 28, 2009, across Nickelodeon, Nick at Nite, and Nicktoons, along with TeenNick (which replaced The N and named after the TEENick block) and Nick Jr. Channel (which replaced Noggin and named after the concurrently-running Nick Jr. block).

The wordmark logo bug was given a blimp background in the days prior to the 2010 and 2011 Kids' Choice Awards to match the award given out at the ceremony; beginning the week of September 7, 2010, the logo bug was surrounded by a splat design (in the manner of the logo used from 2005 to 2009) during new episodes of Nickelodeon original series. The new logo was adopted in the United Kingdom on February 15, 2010, in Spain on February 19, 2010, in Southeast Asia on March 15, 2010, in Latin America on April 5, 2010, in India on June 25, 2010 and on the ABS-CBN block "Nickelodeon on ABS-CBN" in the Philippines on July 26, 2010. On November 2, 2009, a Canadian version of Nickelodeon was launched, in partnership between Viacom and Corus Entertainment (owners of YTV, which had aired and continued to air Nickelodeon's series); as a result, versions of Nickelodeon now exist in most of North America.

In October 2009 and September 2010, respectively, Viacom acquired the Teenage Mutant Ninja Turtles and Winx Club franchises into the Nickelodeon family. Nickelodeon Animation Studio produced a new CGI-animated Turtles series and new seasons of Winx Club with CGI sequences. Both productions comprised Nickelodeon's strategy to reboot two established brands for new viewers: TMNT was intended to reach an audience of boys aged 6 to 11, and Winx was aimed at the same age group of girls. In February 2011, Viacom acquired a third of Rainbow SpA, the Italian studio that introduced Winx Club. The purchase was valued at 62 million euros (US$83 million) and led to new shows being co-developed by Rainbow and Nickelodeon, including My American Friend and Club 57. Also in 2011, Nickelodeon debuted House of Anubis, a series based on the Nickelodeon Netherlands series Het Huis Anubis, which became the first original scripted series to be broadcast in a daily strip (similar to the soap opera format). Produced in the United Kingdom, it was also the first original series by the flagship U.S. channel to be produced entirely outside of North America.

2011 saw Nickelodeon's longtime ratings dominance among all children's cable channels begin to topple: it was the highest-rated cable channel during the first half of that year, only for its viewership to experience a sharp double-digit decline by the end of 2011, described as "inexplicable" by Viacom management. The channel would not experience a calendar week ratings increase until November 2012 (with viewership slowly rebounding after that point); however its 17-year streak as the highest-rated cable network in total day viewership was broken by Disney Channel during that year. Around late 2012, Nickelodeon made a sweeping change to their network by cancelling or ending their teen shows (How to Rock, iCarly, Victorious, Bucket & Skinner's Epic Adventures, Supah Ninjas and Big Time Rush) in favor of newer shows targeted to a younger block. On July 17, 2014, the network televised the inaugural Kids' Choice Sports, a spin-off of the Kids' Choice Awards that honors athletes and teams from the previous year in sports.

From 2016 to 2018, the network produced TV movies based on its older properties, including those of Legends of the Hidden Temple, Hey Arnold!, Rocko's Modern Life, and Invader Zim. The former two aired on the Nickelodeon channel, while the latter two premiered in August 2019 on Netflix.

In June 2018, Cyma Zarghami resigned as president of Nickelodeon, after 33 years of working at the network. In October 2018, All That co-creator Brian Robbins succeeded her as president of Nickelodeon.

On January 22, 2019, Viacom acquired the streaming service Pluto TV for $340 million, which has since launched various Nickelodeon-branded channels. On August 6, 2019, Viacom acquired the rights to the Garfield franchise, with plans for a new animated series. Later that year, Viacom signed a multi-year content production agreement with Netflix to produce several original films and series based on Nickelodeon properties.

After Viacom re-merged with CBS Corporation to form ViacomCBS at the end of 2019, it was announced that Nickelodeon content would be available for streaming on the CBS All Access streaming service (later relaunched as Paramount+ on March 4, 2021), with SpongeBob SquarePants spinoff Kamp Koral and The SpongeBob Movie: Sponge on the Run debuting on the service that same day. Throughout 2021, Paramount+ would announce and debut new programming based on Nickelodeon IP, including a live-action sequel series to The Fairly OddParents that premiered in March 2022, a CGI-animated reboot of Rugrats, and an iCarly sequel series.

By January 2021, Nickelodeon Group announced it had consolidated its live-action film & television production operations including current series & studio content and had combined it with those of ViacomCBS's fellow production & digital media and entertainment subsidiary Awesomeness into forming one live-action production studio under the Nickelodeon Productions and Awesomeness names with Nickelodeon's head of live-action production Shauna Phelan and Zack Olin would serve as co-presidents of the combined production unit Nickelodeon/Awesomess Live-Action Studio whilst continued co-heading Nickelodeon's live-action scripted production operations as they would now heading Awesomeness's live-action production operations whilst Nickelodeon and Awesomnesss Films executive VP Syrinthia Studer would oversee the combined live-action production under the Nickelodeon Productions and Awesomeness names as executive vice president of live-action films.

CBS Sports began partnering with Nickelodeon on its coverage of the National Football League, with Nickelodeon simulcasting a special version of an early 2021 Wild Card playoff game under the NFL on Nickelodeon banner. Nickelodeon would also figure prominently in CBS' own coverage of Super Bowl LV later that year, with special programming and content pertaining to the game itself. The NFL would extend its partnership with Nickelodeon by allowing them to air another Wild Card game in January 2022, and a weekly highlights show hosted by CBS' Nate Burleson and Tyler Perry's Young Dylan star Dylan Gilmer. Nickelodeon aired its first regular-season game in 2022, with the Denver Broncos taking on the defending Super Bowl champion Los Angeles Rams as part of the NFL's Christmas Day slate.

In October 2025, two months after Paramount Global merged with Skydance Media to form Paramount Skydance, Showtime/MTV Entertainment Studios and Skydance Television were folded into the revived Paramount Television Studios shortly after, which also folded Nickelodeon Productions and the former AwesomenessTV production units into it. Paramount Television Studios would then take over as the main production arm for Awesomeness and Nickelodeon; for the latter beginning with the upcoming Victorious spin-off series Hollywood Arts which was moved to Netflix, having been originally ordered at Nickelodeon, as the first Nickelodeon-branded series produced by the revived studio.

== Units ==
- Nickelodeon
  - Nick at Nite
- Nick Jr. (block)
- Nicktoons
  - NickSpongeBob
- TeenNick
- NickMusic
- Nick.com
- NickOnBoard – a Carnival cruise-only television channel launched on 14 April 2019.
- Nickelodeon Records

=== International channels ===
==== Nickelodeon ====
- Sub-Saharan Africa
- Middle East and North Africa — Closed on 25 November 2024.
- Asia — Closed in New Zealand on 31 July 2006.
- India
  - Nick HD+ — Closed on 15 June 2026.
- Israel
- Japan — Closed on 31 January 2022.
- Malaysia
- Pakistan — Closed on 28 October 2024.
- Philippines
- Australia (free-to-air)
- Australia and New Zealand (pay-TV) — Closed in Australia on 1 November 2025, in New Zealand on 2 December 2025.
- New Zealand — Closed on 30 November 2010.
  - NickMusic — Closed in Australia on 1 November 2025, in New Zealand on 31 December 2025.
- Canada — Closed on 1 September 2025.
- Central and Eastern Europe — Closed in Russia on 28 April 2022, in Belarus on 14 December 2022, in MENA, CIS, Turkey on 25 November 2025, in Ukraine on 1 January 2026.
- CIS and Baltics — Closed in Russia on 28 April 2022, in Belarus on 14 December 2022, in Ukraine on 1 January 2026.
- Croatia
- Denmark — Closed on 5 February 2026.
- Flanders
- France and French-speaking Switzerland
- Germany
  - Austria — Closed on 30 June 2025.
  - Switzerland
- Greece — Closed on 1 January 2026.
- Hungary
- Spain — Originally Iberia, but split on 29 January 2026 with Portugal transitioning to Nickelodeon CEE/Global.
- Italy
- Latin America
  - Brazil — Closed on 1 January 2026.
- Dutch
  - NickMusic — Closed on 31 December 2025.
- Poland
- Scandinavia — Closed on 5 February 2026.
- Serbia
- Slovenia
- Sweden — Closed on 5 February 2026.
- Turkey
- UK and Ireland
- Ukraine — Closed in the QTV block on 31 August 2017, in the Pluto TV on 30 June 2023, in the Global feed on 1 January 2026.
- Wallonia

==== Nick Jr. ====
- UK and Ireland – Introduced in 1993.
  - Nick Jr. Too/Nick Jr. 2
- Germany – Introduced in 1995.
- Latin America – Introduced in 1997.
  - Brazil – Introduced in 2008 and closed in 2026.
- Australia and New Zealand – Introduced in 1998 and closed in 2025.
- Turkey – Introduced in 1998.
- Israel – Introduced in 2003.
- The Netherlands – Introduced in 2003.
- France – Introduced in 2005.
- Middle East and North Africa – Introduced in 2008.
- Italy – Introduced in 2009.
- Canada – Introduced in 2009 and closed in 2025 (as a programming block).
- Scandinavia – Introduced in 2010.
- Greece – Introduced in 2010 and closed in 2025.
- Southeast Asia – Introduced in 2010.
- Poland – Introduced in 2010.
- Spain – Introduced in 2010.
- CIS and Georgia – Introduced in 2011 and closed in Russia and Belarus in 2022, in Ukraine in 2026.
- India – Introduced in 2012.
- Sub-Saharan Africa – Introduced in 2014.
- Portugal – Introduced in 2017.

==== Nicktoons ====
- United States – launched on May 1, 2002.
- UK and Ireland – launched on July 22, 2002.
- Netherlands – launched in 2007.
- Germany – launched in March 2010.
- Africa – launched on September 30, 2014.
- Estonia, Latvia, Lithuania – launched on January 2017.
- Scandinavia – launched on February 1, 2017.
- Arabia – launched on February 15, 2017.
- Turkey – launched on February 20, 2017.
- Poland – launched on 15 February 2018.
- Hungary and Romania – launched on 1 April 2019.
- Bulgaria – launched on 5 June 2019.
- Czech Republic – launched on 30 October 2019.
- Moldova – launched on 1 December 2019.
- Serbia, Croatia, Slovenia, Albania – launched on 14 July 2020.
- Australia – launched on 1 August 2023 (streaming channel on 10Play).
- France – launched on January 1, 2003, as a programming block on Canal J and it closed but it came back as N-Toons on Nickelodeon then on July 15 Nickelodeon Teen has been replaced by Nicktoons.
- Latin America – launched on February 4, 2013, and closed down in late 2020, being replaced in major cable providers by the US feed of NickMusic.
- Russia – launched on December 12, 2018, and closed down in Russia on April 28, 2022, in Belarus on 14 December 2022.
- Ukraine – launched on 22 January 2020, and closed down on 1 January 2026.
- Wallonia – launched as N-Toons, a Nickelodeon block on October 21, 2011, but it doesn't live up to its name and airs live-action content such as Supah Ninjas. It closed down on July 31, 2015.
- Canada – available as a channel on Pluto TV.

==== TeenNick ====
- Latin America – launched on September 14, 2020, replacing the former Nick HD feed known as Nick 2. Closed down on December 31, 2025.
- Middle East & North Africa – launched on April 15, 2017. Closed down on November 24, 2024.
- Greece – available as a programming block on Rise TV.
- Israel – launched on March 20, 2017.
- Vietnam – a TeenNick block was launched on HTV3 on September 28, 2018.
- Hungary – launched on January 12, 2021, replacing RTL Spike. Closed down on December 31, 2025.
- Romania – launched on January 12, 2021, replacing Paramount Channel. Closed down on December 31, 2025.
- Czech Republic – launched in September 2021 as a TV channel. Closed down on December 31, 2025.
- Poland – launched on 1 September 2021 as a TV channel.
- Brazil – a TeenNick was launched on Pluto TV on September 21, 2021.
- Germany, Austria, and Switzerland – In May 2020, Pluto TV launched international feeds in these countries.
- UK & Ireland – Launched on 2009 as a programming block on Nickelodeon. Ended July 30, 2010.
- Netherlands and Flanders – launched on February 14, 2011, as a programming block on Nickelodeon. Closed down on September 30, 2015, and replaced by Spike, now Paramount Network.
- India – launched on November 21, 2012, as a programming block on Nick Jr. Ended on February 1, 2017.
- Italy – launched on December 4, 2015. Closed down on May 2, 2020.

== See also ==
- Hanna-Barbera
- The Cartoon Network, Inc.
