= Nick Jr. (Portugal) =

Portuguese television channel

- Country: Portugal
- Broadcast area: Portugal
- Headquarters: Lisbon, Portugal

Programming
- Language: Portuguese
- Picture format: 1080i (HDTV); 576i (16:9 SDTV)

Ownership
- Owner: Paramount Networks EMEAA
- Parent: Nickelodeon Group
- Sister channels: MTV Portugal; Nickelodeon Portugal

History
- Launched: 2 November 2017; 8 years ago

Links
- Website: www.nickjr.pl

Nick Jr. is a children's television channel dedicated to preschool children. It started its transmission in Portugal on 2 November 2017. The channel was available exclusively on NOS, until 4 April 2023, when it was also launched on MEO. On 1 February 2024 the channel became available in HD.

Like Nickelodeon in Portugal, Nick Jr. also shares the same schedule as that of Spain, with the only difference between both feeds being the content broadcast during commercial breaks.
