= QTV (Ukrainian TV channel) =

Former Ukrainian television channel

- Country: Ukraine
- Broadcast area: Nationwide
- Headquarters: Kyiv, Ukraine

Programming
- Language: Ukrainian
- Picture format: 16:9 (576i, HDTV)

Ownership
- Owner: Starlight Media (TOV Hmarochos-Media)

History
- Launched: September 1, 2008 (test broadcasts); September 29, 2008 (regular broadcasts)
- Closed: August 31, 2017
- Former names: Kuy-TB (2008-2010)

QTV was a Ukrainian youth entertainment channel (children's channel in its final months), which started broadcasting on September 1, 2008 under the name Kuy-TB (Куй-ТБ) and was owned by the Starlight Media conglomerate.

On September 1, 2017, the channel was shut down and was replaced by OCE TV.

== History ==
The channel was the business project of the STB's team, which was announced at the beginning of 2008. The first name sounded like "Kui-TB". On September 1, "Kui-TV" began broadcasting at 14:00 in test mode, and on September 29, it began full-fledged broadcasting; subsequently from October 1, it entered GFK Ukraine's ratings measurements. The concept of the TV channel is "impressive reality" (дійсність, що вражає). It is this idea that unites the channel's programs.

The name and logo of the channel was not to everyone's liking. In particular, the then member of the National Council of Ukraine on Television and Radio Broadcasting Yurii Plaksyuk expressed his opinion on this matter:

"The Kui-TB logo is not just a play on words that can be gossiped about and forgotten. This will cause an ambiguous reaction in society. I understand that foul language is used by a large part of the population, but I also understand that a large part of people are annoyed by mat. Why should we take into account the interests of the first group and completely ignore the needs of the second? In my opinion, this is a name for a party, not a broadcaster."

Vladyslav Lyasovsky suggested that the National Council address the National Expert Commission on the Protection of Public Morals regarding the compliance of the "Kui-TB" logo with the Law of Ukraine "On the Protection of Public Morals". To which Tetyana Lebedeva, a member of the National Council, reproached her colleagues for being sociable.

As a result, the representative of the channel, the company "Khmarochos Media" decided to submit a new logo for approval to the National Council for Television and Radio Broadcasting: a hammer with the inscription "TV" and an anvil in the shape of a screen. Since the phrase "Kui-TV" was a separate trademark, it was not used on the air before receiving the opinion of the National Expert Commission on Public Morals.

The following programs were broadcast on "Kui-TV": "Guinness Records Show" ("Ginesnya"), "Chris Angel Mindfreak" ("Kui-fiction"), wrestling and fights without rules ("Male Mammals" and "Myasobka"), adult animation ("Katrusin cinema hall", "Harvey Birdman_ Attorney at Law"), fool show "The crazy gang" ("Guys from our village"), erotica at night ("Visiting fairy tales", "Zarasutra", "Night fantasies", "Naked and funny"), "Anatomy for beginners" ("Morgue", slot "Spalahuyka"), "Bleach in chocolate with Ksenia Sobchak" ("Female mammal"), "10 things you should try before you die" ("Entertaining snuff"), "Kui-Parad", "Bebapedia", etc.

On November 11, 2009, the TV channel became part of the Starlight Media media holding.

On February 22, 2010, the Kui-TV channel was rebranded as QTV. As Ilya Semenov, acting director of the TV channel, explains, the restart is caused by the desire to expand the audience of the channel by attracting new groups of viewers. The channel's new slogan was "This is fantastic!". After the channel was updated, the following series appeared: "Dexter", "Star Trek", "Doctor Who", "Xena: Warrior Princess", "Power Rangers"; Entertainment: Warrior of All Time, Delusion, Piss Addiction; Anime: Naruto, and the animated series Robot Chicken, SpongeBob SquarePants, Avatar: The Last Airbender, and Futurama.

From April 10 of the same year, the TV channel launched cartoon series for adults from Adult Swim.

As of 2012, the core audience of the channel consisted of men aged 14–25. The average share of QTV for this CA in 2012 was 3.72% (panel of 50 thousand+).

On October 9, 2013, wrestling commentators announced the termination of the broadcast of the WWE show on the television channel.

With the outbreak of the Russo-Ukrainian war in 2014, the channel released a video with the national anthem on its website. It never had the intention to air it on the channel.

On August 29, 2015, the program "Igronauts" announced the possibility of the return of the WWE show on "QTV", for example, at night, like on the Russian "2x2". However, on September 12, issue 191 revealed that there was no talk of resuming the broadcast of the show, and the statement about the "return" turned out to be an advertisement for the WWE 2K16 videogame.

On August 31, 2015, "QTV" changed its logo and on-air graphics, in which the orange logo in the form of the letter "Q", the orange letter "Q" became the main character of the announcements in the September promotional campaign of the new season of the TV channel.

On December 1, 2015, together with the related channel STB, it started broadcasting in widescreen format (16:9).

Since the beginning of 2017, the TV channel has reprogrammed the program grid and began to focus on children under the age of 12.

On September 1, 2017, the TV channel was reformatted into "OTSE TV". According to a member of the National Council, Valenty Koval, the reason for the closure was economic reasons — some advertisers fundamentally refused to advertise in children's blocks. The channel's audience was also the reason for the closure: previously the audience was adults, and since 2017, after the channel removed programs and animated series for an adult audience from the broadcast network, the channel began to focus on children aged 4 to 11 years.
