= Nick Jr. (CIS and Georgia) =

Russian-language children's television channel

- Country: United Kingdom
- Broadcast area: CIS: Russia (1 November 2011 – 28 April 2022); Belarus (1 November 2011 – 14 December 2022); Ukraine (1 November 2011 – 1 January 2026); Kazakhstan; Armenia; Azerbaijan; Moldova; Uzbekistan; Turkmenistan; Kyrgyzstan; Tajikistan; Georgia
- Headquarters: London, United Kingdom

Programming
- Languages: Russian; English; Kazakh; Ukrainian; Lithuanian; Latvian; Estonian
- Picture format: 16:9 576i (SDTV)

Ownership
- Owner: Paramount Networks EMEAA
- Parent: Nickelodeon Group
- Sister channels: Nickelodeon Global Unlimited; Nickelodeon Asia; Nicktoons Global; Comedy Central CIS

History
- Launched: 1 November 2011; 15 years ago
- Founder: MTV Networks Europe
- Closed: 28 April 2022; 4 years ago (Russia); 14 December 2022; 3 years ago (Belarus); 1 January 2026; 10 months ago (Ukraine)

Links
- Website: www.jr.nickelodeon.ru (Nick Jr. Russian-language official website is closed, now redirects to Global website of Nickelodeon)

Nick Jr. (Russian: Ник Джуниор, romanized: Nik Džunior) is a Russian-language children's cable and satellite television channel which launched on 1 November 2011. The channel closed in Russia on 28 April 2022, in Belarus on 14 December 2022 and in Ukraine on 1 January 2026.

== History ==
On 1 November 2011, MTV Networks Europe (now Paramount Networks EMEAA) launched Nick Jr. in Russia and the CIS countries. Before its launch as a full-time channel Nick Jr. had a block on Nickelodeon. The channel served by the European feed of Nick Jr., so no Russian-language text appeared on channel promos, info or bumpers.

The channel closed in Russia on 28 April 2022, and in Belarus on 14 December 2022, in response to the Russian invasion of Ukraine. In April 2023, a Kazakh audio track was added.

On 1 January 2026, the channel closed in Ukraine along with Nickelodeon and Nicktoons channels in the region.
