= Nicktoons (American TV channel) =

American digital cable and satellite television channel

- Logo used since January 1, 2024 (Note: The logo's wordmark has been in use since September 28, 2009. Additionally, this is a variant meant to be used for white backgrounds; the main variant has a white (for Nick) and green (for Toons) wordmark in conjunction with a fully orange splat.)
- Country: United States
- Broadcast area: Nationwide
- Headquarters: One Astor Plaza; New York City, U.S.

Programming
- Languages: English; Spanish (via SAP audio track); Portuguese (in Brazil)
- Picture format: 1080i HDTV (downscaled to letterboxed 480i for the SDTV feed)

Ownership
- Owner: Skydance Corporation
- Parent: Nickelodeon Group
- Sister channels: List: Adult Swim; Boomerang; Cartoon Network; Cartoonito; Discovery Familia; Discovery Family; Nickelodeon; Nick at Nite; Nick Jr.; NickMusic; TeenNick

History
- Launched: May 1, 2002; 24 years ago
- Former names: Nicktoons TV (2002–03); Nicktoons Network (2005–09)

Availability

Streaming media
- Affiliated streaming service: Paramount+
- Service(s): DirecTV Stream, Hulu + Live TV, Philo, Sling TV, YouTube TV

Nicktoons (formerly Nicktoons TV and Nicktoons Network) is an American pay television channel owned by the Nickelodeon Group, a subdivision of the television division of Skydance. Launched on May 1, 2002, the channel is geared towards children and adolescents aged 6 to 15, and serves as an extension of the eponymous brand used by Nickelodeon for its original animated programming.

As of December 2023, Nicktoons is available to approximately 43 million pay television households in the United States, down from its peak of 69 million in 2013.

== History ==
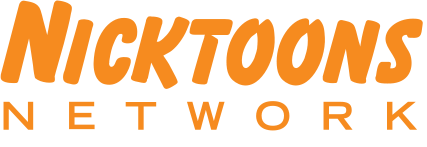
Nicktoons Network wordmark used from September 23, 2005 to September 28, 2009

Nicktoons launched on May 1, 2002, as Nicktoons TV. It was part of the digital cable–exclusive MTV Networks Digital Suite, in order to entice cable operators to pick up the network and give them a marketing advantage over satellite services. However, by early 2004, Nickelodeon management changed course and offered it to digital satellite services DirecTV and Dish Network. The network was originally marketed as commercial-free, with comedic promos involving Nickelodeon Animation Studios, two-minute cartoon shorts from foreign markets, and former program promotions that had previously been used on Nickelodeon taking up commercial time. By September 23, 2005, as the network's distribution increased, it began to carry regular advertising.

On September 28, 2009, the network's logo changed as part of Nickelodeon's universal rebranding effort. A high-definition feed was launched on August 13, 2013, and is available on several providers. Like Viacom's other HD channels, any programming produced in 4:3 SD is pillarboxed on this feed. As the network blended in more Nickelodeon programming into its schedule, the Nicktoons website was sunset to a parking page directing viewers to Nick.com before it was eventually redirected quietly to the latter website.

Splatless version of the 2023 logo, with “TOOnS” in green-cyan, concurrently used alongside the main version since January 1, 2024

On January 1, 2024, Nicktoons (along with TeenNick) debuted its variant of the refreshed Splat logo and new on-air interstitials, similar to Nickelodeon's. This refresh also changes the color for "TOOnS" from blue to green-cyan.

=== NickSpongeBob ===
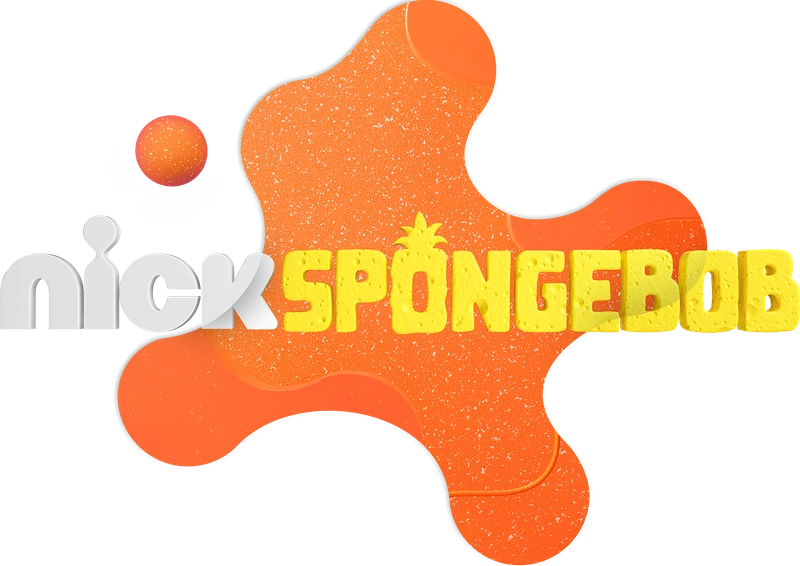
NickSpongeBob logo used since May 23–September 8, 2025, and May 25–September 8, 2026

As part of Paramount's efforts to honor the 25th anniversary of SpongeBob SquarePants, Nicktoons began to primarily run only SpongeBob and associated media daily beginning on May 13, 2024, promoted as "Non-Stop SpongeBob. All Day. Every Day." Repeat airings of new episodes of Nickelodeon's other animated series returned to Nicktoons later in the year. On May 23, 2025, Nicktoons temporarily rebranded itself as NickSpongeBob, following a trend set by the British and Irish version of the channel starting in 2022, during airings of SpongeBob shows, focusing exclusively on broadcasting content from the franchise throughout the summer. The channel returned to Nicktoons on September 8, 2025. It again rebranded to NickSpongeBob on May 25, 2026, and again returned to Nicktoons on September 8, but the channel's schedule continued to be exclusively episodes of SpongeBob SquarePants.

== Programming ==
Since its inception, Nicktoons mainly aired programs carried over from the main Nickelodeon channel, with some occasional airing of Nickelodeon's live-action programming depending on Viacom's programming direction at the time.

Beginning in the mid-2000s, older shows such as Rocko's Modern Life and CatDog were removed from the schedule as more acquired programming and Nicktoons Network originals were premiering. Many of these programs were phased out in the early 2010s. Fantastic Four: World's Greatest Heroes, Iron Man: Armored Adventures, and Wolverine and the X-Men were effectively cancelled when The Walt Disney Company acquired Marvel Studios in 2009.

Historically, episodes of under-performing Nickelodeon programs, including original shows and acquisitions, have been burned off on the Nicktoons channel. Some first run shows include The Angry Beavers, As Told by Ginger, Back at the Barnyard, Breadwinners, Bunsen Is a Beast, CatDog, El Tigre: The Adventures of Manny Rivera, Fanboy & Chum Chum, The Fairly OddParents, Harvey Beaks, Invader Zim, It's Pony, Kung Fu Panda: Legends of Awesomeness, Digimon Fusion, Making Fiends, The Mighty B!, My Life as a Teenage Robot, The Penguins of Madagascar, Pig Goat Banana Cricket, Planet Sheen, Random! Cartoons, Robot and Monster, T.U.F.F. Puppy, Teenage Mutant Ninja Turtles (2012), and Welcome to the Wayne. Some acquired shows that were moved over and finished their runs on the network include Alvinnn!!! and the Chipmunks, Ollie's Pack, and Rabbids Invasion (though the later seasons moved to Netflix for its fourth and final season, along with its hour-long series finale follow-up "Mission to Mars").

=== NickSports ===
On September 3, 2014, a two-hour Wednesday prime-time programming block named NickSports was launched, tying into the Kids' Choice Sports inaugurated earlier that year. The block presented mainly licensed programming focusing on sports, including the Rob Dyrdek-starring Wild Grinders and NFL Rush Zone: Guardians of the Core, along with sports-related feature films such as Bend It Like Beckham, Cool Runnings, and Space Jam. Sometime in 2015, the block was moved to a Friday prime time slot. The block ended in September 2018.

== International versions ==
=== Active channels ===
- UK & Ireland – launched on 22 July 2002
- Netherlands & Flanders– launched on August 2, 2007
- Germany & Austria – launched in March 2010
- Africa – launched on September 30, 2014
- Estonia, Latvia, Lithuania – launched on January 2017
- Scandinavia – launched on February 1, 2017
- Arabia – launched on February 15, 2017
- Turkey – launched on February 20, 2017
- Poland – launched on 15 February 2018
- Hungary & Romania – launched on 1 April 2019
- Bulgaria – launched on 5 June 2019
- Czech Republic – launched on 30 October 2019
- Moldova – launched on 1 December 2019
- Serbia, Croatia, Slovenia, Albania – launched on 14 July 2020
- Australia - launched on 1 August 2023 (FAST channel on 10Play)
- Canada - launched on December 22, 2023 (FAST channel on Pluto TV)
- France - launched on 15 July 2025, replacing Nickelodeon Teen

=== Defunct channels ===
- Latin America & Brazil – launched on February 4, 2013, and closed down in Mexico on late 2020, being replaced in major cable providers by the US feed of NickMusic
- Russia – launched on December 12, 2018, and closed down in Russia on 28 April 2022, in Belarus on 14 December 2022
- Ukraine – launched on 22 January 2020, and closed down on 1 January 2026.

== Branding ==
From 2005 until 2009, Nicktoons Network branded itself as the "Animation Capital of the World" (or "ACOW") in advertisements for the channel. Various mascots were seen in promotional bumpers, including the Three Headed Monster. Around this time, the Nicktoons Network website introduced an animated robot character with a large singular eye, animated using "photo-puppetry."

== See also ==
- Noggin
- N-Toons
- Nicktoonsters
- NickRewind
