= Nickelodeon (Sweden) =

Defunct Swedish children's television channel

Nickelodeon Sweden
- Final logo used from 1 August 2023 to 5 February 2026 (Note: The logo's wordmark had been in use since 2010. Additionally, there is a variant meant to be used for white backgrounds; the main variant has a white wordmark in conjunction with a fully orange splat.)
- Country: Sweden; Finland; Denmark; Norway
- Broadcast area: Sweden; Finland; Denmark; Norway

Programming
- Languages: Swedish; Finnish; Danish; Norwegian
- Picture format: 1080i HDTV

Ownership
- Owner: Paramount Networks EMEAA
- Parent: Nickelodeon Group

History
- Launched: 1996 (as Nickelodeon Scandinavia); 18 June 2008 (as Nickelodeon Sweden)
- Replaced: Nickelodeon Scandinavia
- Closed: 2021 (as Nickelodeon Sweden as an independent feed); 5 February 2026 (as Nickelodeon Scandinavia)
- Replaced by: Nickelodeon Global Unlimited

Availability

Terrestrial
- Boxer: Channel 30

Nickelodeon was a Swedish children's pay television channel broadcasting in Sweden, Finland, Denmark and Norway, the channel's headquarters was based in the United States.

Nickelodeon was the most popular commercial children's television channel in Sweden.

== History ==
Nickelodeon started broadcasting in Sweden in 1996, when a pan-Scandinavian version was launched on the analogue Viasat platform. In 2001, it began broadcasting as a digital terrestrial television network. This pan-Scandinavian channel formerly broadcast between 6 a.m. and 6 p.m. when it started sharing a transponder with TV6 Nature/Action World in the late 1990s. In March 2008, Nickelodeon received a license to broadcast between 5 a.m. and 7 p.m. on the terrestrial network.

On 18 June 2008, the dedicated Swedish version of Nickelodeon was launched with a separate schedule. The channel originally broadcast between 5 a.m. and 7 p.m. on most digital pay television platforms. Unlike the pan-Scandinavian channel, which was broadcast from the UK, the Swedish version was broadcast from the Netherlands.

In September 2013, Nickelodeon Sweden started to use the idents from Nickelodeon USA and Nickelodeon UK and Ireland.

The channel started sharing the frequency space with Comedy Central Sweden when the channel launched in January 2009. The two channels became separate channel slots in November 2013. This allowed Nickelodeon Sweden to broadcast between 5 a.m. and 9 p.m. on most providers from 15 November.

Another hour was added to the broadcast day on 1 October 2015. After that, the channel would broadcast between 5 a.m. and 10 p.m.

In 2021, Nickelodeon Sweden discontinued its independent feed and started simulcasting the Scandinavian feed.

On 5 February 2026, Nickelodeon in Sweden and Scandinavia transitioned into Nickelodeon Global Unlimited, having the same signal as Central Europe.

== Programming ==
The daily schedule started with a Nick Jr block for younger children with series such as Dora the Explorer, The Backyardigans and Paw Patrol. The channel also included a music video block called "Nick Hits". Cartoons for younger children were dubbed into Swedish. Live-action series aimed an older audience were broadcast in English with Swedish subtitles, but some were broadcast with Swedish dubbing.

The Nicktoon The Fairly OddParents was broadcast on Disney Channel and Nickelodeon in Sweden.
