= Nickelodeon (Japanese TV channel) =

Japanese television channel

- Final Logo used from January 30, 2018 to January 31, 2022
- Country: Japan
- Headquarters: Tokyo, Japan

Programming
- Language: Japanese
- Picture format: 1080i HDTV

Ownership
- Owner: ViacomCBS Networks Japan K.K. (ViacomCBS)
- Parent: Nickelodeon Group

History
- Launched: November 20, 1998; 27 years ago (first iteration); January 30, 2018; 8 years ago (as a brand for OTT media services, second iteration)
- Closed: September 30, 2009; 16 years ago (first iteration); January 31, 2022; 4 years ago (second iteration)

Nickelodeon (Japanese: ニコロデオン, Hepburn: Nikorodeon) was a Japanese television channel which was targeted mainly at children, teens and adults, operated by ViacomCBS Networks Japan K.K. (a subsidiary of ViacomCBS Networks EMEAA division of the eponymous television channel in the United States). It originally launched in November 1998 as a cable and satellite television channel, but due to declining viewership, the television channel was shut down on September 30, 2009. The channel was revived for OTT media services from January 30, 2018, to January 31, 2022.

== History ==
Nickelodeon launched on DirecTV channel 272 on November 15, 1998, in Japan. The withdrawal of DirecTV from Japan led to Nickelodeon moving to SKY PerfecTV! channel 278 on October 1, 2000. In January 2006, Nickelodeon switched to telecommunications service utilization broadcasting and moved to channel 751 on SKY PerfecTV! while also being available on select cable providers across Japan. The channel was renewed in October 2006.

Nickelodeon closed in Japan on September 30, 2009, due to declining ratings and robust domestic and international competition. Viacom continued to distribute select Nickelodeon series to its other networks (including MTV Japan), DTH satellite channels, and terrestrial television networks. NHK Educational TV, which had already been airing SpongeBob SquarePants, premiered The Penguins of Madagascar and iCarly in 2010. Nickelodeon's programs (including SpongeBob SquarePants) were also broadcast on Animax in Japan under a television block titled "NickTime", which premiered on September 1, 2010. The official Nickelodeon website remained online, with program information, website games and downloadable content.

The logo of the Animax NickTime block

On October 18, 2017, Viacom announced it would relaunch the Nickelodeon channel on dTV (a subscription TV streaming service of NTT Docomo). Nickelodeon relaunched on dTV and Hulu Japan on January 30, 2018. An official Facebook account was created on April 20. The Nickelodeon channel launched on Amazon Prime Video on July 3. Nickelodeon was available on music.jp from March 15, 2019, to January 31, 2021. On April 28, 2021, Rakuten TV began offering Nick+, a collection of Nickelodeon programs available for 440 yen per month. On January 31, 2022, the linear Nickelodeon channel was discontinued. The following day, Nickelodeon renewed its video-on-demand distribution agreement with Amazon Prime Video which lasted until 2024, when the VOD channel converted into Paramount+. Some of the channel's series continue to broadcast through separate syndication deals with Japanese broadcasters, for example SpongeBob SquarePants airs on Kids Station and NHK E.
