= MTV Base =

MTV Base may refer to:

- MTV Base (Africa)
- MTV Base (France)
- MTV Base (UK & Ireland)
