= Nick Jr. Channel =

American children's television channel

- Logo used since September 4, 2023 (Note: The logo's wordmark has been in use since September 28, 2009. Additionally, this is a variant meant for use on white backgrounds; the primary logo has a white (for Nick) and blue (for Jr.) wordmark in conjunction with a fully orange splat.)
- Country: United States
- Broadcast area: Nationwide
- Headquarters: One Astor Plaza; New York City, U.S.

Programming
- Languages: English; Spanish (via SAP audio track)
- Picture format: 1080i HDTV (downscaled to letterboxed 480i for the SDTV feed)

Ownership
- Owner: Skydance Corporation
- Parent: Nickelodeon Group
- Sister channels: List: Adult Swim; Boomerang; Cartoon Network; Cartoonito; Discovery Familia; Discovery Family; Nickelodeon; Nick at Nite; Nick Jr.; NickMusic; Nicktoons; TeenNick

History
- Launched: September 28, 2009; 17 years ago
- Replaced: Noggin (channel)

Links
- Website: www.nickjr.com (Archive link)

Availability

Streaming media
- Affiliated streaming service: Paramount+
- Other service(s): DirecTV Stream, FuboTV, Hulu + Live TV, Philo, Sling TV, YouTube TV

The Nick Jr. Channel (commonly shortened to Nick Jr.) is an American pay television channel owned by the Nickelodeon Group, a subdivision of the television division of Skydance Corporation. It launched on September 28, 2009, as a spin-off of Nickelodeon's programming block of the same name, and targets children aged 2 to 6, with a mix of original programming and series from the Nick Jr. block. To avoid confusion, the channel has been identified on-air as the "Nick Jr. Channel" since March 2018 and on-screen until September 2023.

The Nick Jr. channel replaced Noggin, which returned in 2015 as a streaming service and existed as a separate sister brand until its independent relaunch in 2025. Noggin's programming is distinct from Nick Jr.'s, primarily featuring pre-teen programs in its early years as a channel, while the streaming service featured a variety of exclusive series. From May 2021 to March 2022, the Nick Jr. Channel aired a "Noggin Hour" programming block every Friday, featuring series such as Noggin Knows and Kinderwood.

Both the Nick Jr. block and channel are currently running, with the former airing weekdays on Nickelodeon from 7:00 a.m. to 2:00 p.m. ET (hours vary during summer months, other school breaks, and major national holidays), featuring traditional commercial breaks for certain programs. As of November 2023, the Nick Jr. Channel is available to approximately 54 million pay television households in the United States, down from its peak of 77 million in 2013.

== History ==
=== Nick Jr. block (1988–present) ===
Since its inception in 1977, Nickelodeon's channel space had aired preschool-oriented programs, including Pinwheel, which was their first original series. These were usually played on weekday mornings when older children were in school and younger children were not. This block ran from 8:00 a.m. to 2:00 p.m. On January 4, 1988, Nickelodeon debuted a name for its preschool block: Nick Junior. Between September 1988 and mid-1989, the name was shortened to Nick Jr. on-air.

At launch, the block mostly showed imported series purchased from other companies. Eureeka's Castle was the first original series that Nickelodeon made for the block. Brown Johnson, the former vice president of Nick Jr., stated in a 2000 interview that after Eureeka ended production, Nick Jr. became "a neglected daypart" compared to the main Nickelodeon. "Without the investment of energy or money, the block floundered until 1994 when the network poured $30 million into a full-scale relaunch," said Johnson.

On September 5, 1994, the Nick Jr. block began its relaunch and introduced Face, its first host and no longer ran commercial breaks as intermissions during shows. Gullah Gullah Island and Allegra's Window, the second and third original series made for Nick Jr., premiered. They resulted in 50% rating gains for the block. From then onward, Nickelodeon continued to create its own productions for Nick Jr. and foreign-made imports were phased out. Blue's Clues and Dora the Explorer became ratings draws for both the block and Nickelodeon as a whole.

Before gaining its own spin-off network, the Nick Jr. block extended to several other networks: Nick Jr. on CBS from 2000 to 2006, and Nick Jr. on Noggin from 1999 to 2009. The Nick Jr. on CBS block ended on September 9, 2006 when CBS replaced its Nick Jr. programming with KOL Secret Slumber Party. Nick Jr. series continued to appear on Noggin until its closure, when the Nick Jr. channel replaced it.

=== Nick Jr. channel (2009–present) ===
On February 23, 2009, Nickelodeon announced that Noggin would be replaced by a channel named after the Nick Jr. block. The intention was to bring the channel in line with the Nickelodeon brand identity, as reruns from the Nick Jr. library had been gradually overtaking Noggin's lineup since 2003. In July of that year, Nickelodeon unveiled new standardized logos for its five channels, intending to create a unified look that could better be conveyed across the services.

The Nick Jr. channel debuted on September 28, 2009, at 6:00 a.m. ET, accompanied by the debut of a new logo designed by New York-based creative director Eric Zim. Although the use of an orange "adult" and blue "child" figure was discontinued in the new wordmark logo, the tradition of coloring the "Nick" text in orange (representing the adult) and the "Jr." text in blue (as the child) remained. The channel originally retained several Noggin programs and interstitials. It also continued not to accept traditional advertising or marginalize closing credits for promotion of other shows on the channel.

On March 1, 2012, the Nick Jr. channel received a new rebrand produced by Gretel Inc. Jessica DiCicco became the network's announcer, and the Moose and Zee mascots were dropped, removing one of the last vestiges of Noggin; as a result, some of the interstitial learning activities that originally featured Moose's narration (like the Puzzle Time segments) were recycled and replaced by her narration. The channel's slogan changed from "It's Like Preschool On TV" to "The Smart Place To Play" (which was also used as the branding for the Nick Jr. block), while several shows—The Upside Down Show, Oswald, Jack's Big Music Show, Franklin, Toot & Puddle and Miss Spider's Sunny Patch Friends—were pulled from the lineup; most of them would return later that year, while the former could still be seen on the channel's website at the time.

At this point, programming began to be hosted by characters from Nick Jr. shows. The Nick Jr. channel also began incorporating programming promotions and short features on that date; seven months later, on October 1, 2012, it started airing limited traditional advertising (for companies such as ABCMouse, Kmart, Chuck E. Cheese's, Nabi, Clorox, Walmart, Lysol and Playskool) in the form of underwriter sponsorships airing in-between shows, whereas its parent network airs longer traditional advertising.

Logo used from May 21, 2018 to September 4, 2023 on other on-screen graphics such as interstitials; in which the logo is in slightly darker color.

Nick Jr. Channel logo, used on-air from 2018 until 2023.

On May 21, 2018, the channel refreshed its imaging with new interstitials and updated curriculum notices, and began promoting itself as the "Nick Jr. Channel" to avoid confusion with the Nickelodeon block. The following August, many older shows, including The Backyardigans, Go, Diego, Go!, Little Bear, and Wonder Pets!, were pulled from the lineup to make way for newer shows.

Logo used since September 4, 2023.

Alternate logo with slightly different text placing concurrently used alongside the 2023 logo since September 4, 2023.

On September 4, 2023, the channel rebranded to use the refreshed splat logo, as well as new bumpers and curriculum boards (to keep in line with the Nickelodeon block, which began using the new branding on July 5, 2023). On the same day, the "Nick Jr. Channel" logo was changed to one reading simply "Nick Jr." for the first time since 2009. However, new promos continue to refer to the channel as the "Nick Jr. Channel".

==== NickMom block (2012–15) ====
From October 1, 2012, to September 28, 2015, a four-hour block of parent-targeted shows called NickMom aired from 10:00 p.m. to 2:00 a.m. ET. The NickMom name started out with a humor website in 2011 and the four-hour time slot aired comedies like Instant Mom and NickMom Night Out.

On September 9, 2015, the social media channels of NickMom announced that the four-hour weeknight block on the Nick Jr. channel, along with the NickMom website, would end operations by the end of September 28, 2015, due to Viacom's 2015 cutbacks involving acquired programming and also due to NickMom's low ratings with the time vacated by NickMom returned to traditional Nick Jr. programming like Dora the Explorer, Blue's Clues, Team Umizoomi, and Bubble Guppies. In the early morning of September 28, 2015, NickMom ended its 3-year run at 2:00 a.m. ET, with an airing of the film Guarding Tess. No sign off message was shown; after the film Guarding Tess, it faded straight into an episode of Yo Gabba Gabba! at its end. NickMom's former website address is now used as a redirect to Nickelodeon's site for parental resources.

Following NickMom's closure, the Nick Jr. channel increased the amount of traditional advertising it aired, but also began scheduling programs in an inversion of the "off-the-clock" format where the network shortened some of its commercial breaks, allowing the network to air more programming. The "off-the-clock" format was previously adopted by various Viacom networks, such as TV Land, Nick at Nite and Comedy Central (though in a reversed form, the scheduling format for those channels was designed to add extra advertising loads).

==== Noggin Hour block (2021–22) ====
On May 28, 2021, the Nick Jr. channel introduced an hour-long block of programming from the Noggin app every Friday. The block was usually titled "Noggin Hour" and was retitled "Noggin Presents" on days when it ran longer than an hour. Series featured in the timeslot included the Noggin originals Kinderwood and Noggin Knows, as well as the acquired shows Hey Duggee and JoJo & Gran Gran. Noggin interstitials played during commercial breaks, and a purple screen bug reading "On Noggin" was shown toward the beginning of each show.

== Programming ==
The Nick Jr. channel features a mix of current and former series from Nickelodeon's library of preschool programming, along with a few shows exclusive to the channel. As of 2026, the channel's lineup includes Gabby's Dollhouse, Bubble Guppies, Paw Patrol, Peppa Pig, Rubble & Crew, Mr. Crocodile, Santiago of the Seas, Tim Rex in Space, Team Umizoomi and Bedtime Stories with Ryan.

== Related services ==
Service	Description
Nick Jr. HD	Nick Jr. HD is the high-definition simulcast feed of Nick Jr. that broadcasts in the 1080i resolution format; the feed first began broadcasting on August 1, 2013. Like other Viacom-owned networks that have high-definition feeds, 16:9 sourced content broadcasts in HD, while 4:3 sourced content broadcasts pillarboxed. As of 2018, many providers carry the high-definition feed and downscale it for the standard-definition feed, broadcasting in 16:9 letterboxed to fit the 4:3 ratio.
Nick Jr. On Demand	Nick Jr. on Demand is the network's video-on-demand service, which is available on most subscription providers.
Nick Jr. on Pluto TV	Advertising-supported streaming service Pluto TV, which Viacom acquired in January 2019, added a free version of Nick Jr. on May 1, consisting mainly of older library and archive content. There are also several channels on the service devoted solely to one Nick Jr. series around the clock, and overall advertising is reduced on these channels, as is done on the cable services.
Paramount+	Programming from Nick Jr. was slowly introduced to what was then CBS All Access in November 2019 after the closure of the Viacom/CBS merger, and was a part of Paramount+ from its March 4, 2021 launch.
Noggin	An educational brand established by Nickelodeon and Sesame Workshop. Its flagship channel launched on February 2, 1999, occupying the space now held by the Nick Jr. channel. The Noggin brand was dormant from 2009 to 2015, when it relaunched a separate streaming service. The Nick Jr. channel carried a block of programming from the Noggin app every Friday from May 2021 to March 2022. On February 15, 2024, Paramount Global announced that Noggin would shut down later that year, resulting in the immediate layoff of its staff and its video library migrating to Paramount+. The service shut down on July 2, 2024, and in October, Paramount sold the Noggin IP to former CEO Kristen Kane.

== International ==
International versions of the Nick Jr. channel include:

- Nick Jr. (UK & Ireland) – Introduced in 1993
  - Nick Jr. 2/Nick Jr. Too
- Nick Jr. (Germany) – Introduced in 1995
- Nick Jr. (Latin America) – Introduced in 1997
- Nick Jr. (Brazil) – Introduced in 2008 and closed in 2026
- Nick Jr. (Australia and New Zealand) – Introduced in 1998 and closed in 2025
- Nick Jr. (Turkey) – Introduced in 1998
- Nick Jr. (Israel) – Introduced in 2003
- Nick Jr. (Netherlands) – Introduced in 2003
- Nickelodeon Junior (France) – Introduced in 2010
  - Nick Jr. (Wallonia)
- Nick Jr. (Middle East and North Africa) – Introduced in 2008
- Nick Jr. (Italy) – Introduced in 2009
- Nick Jr. (Canada) – Introduced in 2009 and closed in 2025 (as a programming block)
- Nick Jr. (Scandinavia) – Introduced in 2010
- Nick Jr. (Greece) – Introduced in 2010 and closed in 2025
- Nick Jr. (Southeast Asia) – Introduced in 2010
- Nick Jr. (Poland) – Introduced in 2010
- Nick Jr. (Spain) – Introduced in 2010
- Nick Jr. (Russia) – Introduced in 2011 and closed in 2022 in Russia and Belarus, in 2026 in Ukraine, the broadcast of the CIS continue
- Nick Jr. (India) – Introduced in 2012
- Nick Jr. (Sub-Saharan Africa) – Introduced in 2014
- Nick Jr. (Portugal) – Introduced in 2017

Nick Jr. was also available in Japan as a programming block on the Japanese version of Nickelodeon. Until August 2025, Nick Jr. content in Canada was licensed to the children's channel Treehouse TV.

== See also ==
- Nick Jr.
