= Nickelodeon (Italy) =

- Logo used since 2023 (Note: The logo's wordmark has been in use since 2010. Additionally, there is a variant meant to be used for white backgrounds; the main variant has a white wordmark in conjunction with a fully orange splat.)
- Country: Italy
- Broadcast area: Italy; San Marino; Vatican City

Programming
- Languages: Italian, English
- Picture format: 1080i (HDTV)
- Timeshift service: Nickelodeon +1 (2009-2025)

Ownership
- Owner: Skydance Corporation
- Parent: Nickelodeon Group
- Sister channels: Nick Jr.

History
- Launched: 1 November 2004; 21 years ago 1 August 2009; 17 years ago (+1)
- Closed: 1 December 2025; 10 months ago (Nickelodeon +1 only)

Links
- Website: nicktv.it

Availability

Streaming media
- Sky Go: Nickelodeon
- Sky Kids: Nickelodeon
- Now: Nickelodeon

Nickelodeon is an Italian children’s television channel launched on 1 November 2004 on Sky Italia. From 1996–1999, Rai Sat 2 broadcast Nickelodeon cartoons for three hours a day. It is based on the eponymous American cable television channel.

== History ==
In 1997, Viacom collaborated with the Italian company "RaiSat", a now defunct division of RAI originally created to manage their Satellite Networks, to have a TV block on the channel "RaiSat 2 - Ragazzi", which broadcast for three hours daily.

The channel was launched on 1 November 2004. During its initial operational phase, it divided its frequency with Comedy Central, which broadcast at night.

On 31 July 2009, the network expanded its reach by launching a +1 hour timeshift version. The next day Nick Jr. was launched, replacing RaiSat YOYO. The latter transitioned to a free-to-air model and was rebranded as Rai Yoyo.

On 9 September 2013, it and the +1 version of the network converted to a 16:9 widescreen aspect ratio.

On July 3, 2023, the channel implemented a restyling of its graphics and logo, ensuring visual consistency with its international counterparts.

On 1 December 2025, the channel made a return to channel 603 on the Sky Italia platform, a move necessitated by the arrival of Disney Jr. onto the satellite lineup. As a direct consequence of this reshuffling, the +1 timeshift version of the channel officially ceased all broadcasting operations.

== Related channels ==
=== Nick Jr. ===
Nick Jr. is an Italian children’s TV channel aimed at pre-school children. It is available on Sky Italia and was launched on 1 August 2009.

=== TeenNick ===
TeenNick was an Italian TV channel aimed at teens and pre-teens and aired a wide-variety of Nickelodeons live-action programming. It was launched on 4 December 2015, though was unsuccessful and closed after about 5 years of broadcasting on 2 May 2020. The channel was available through Sky Italia.
