= Nick Jr. (Italy) =

Italian television channel

- Logo used since 11 February 2024
- Country: Italy
- Broadcast area: Italy, San Marino, Vatican City

Programming
- Languages: Italian, English
- Picture format: 576i (SDTV)
- Timeshift service: Nick Jr. +1 (2011-2025)

Ownership
- Owner: Skydance Corporation
- Parent: Nickelodeon Group
- Sister channels: Nickelodeon

History
- Launched: 31 July 2009; 17 years ago 4 July 2011; 15 years ago (+1)
- Closed: 1 December 2025; 11 months ago (Nick Jr. +1 only)

Links
- Website: nickjr.it

Availability

Streaming media
- Sky Go: Nick Jr.
- Sky Kids: Nick Jr.
- Now: Nick Jr.

Nick Jr. is an Italian television channel, aimed at a pre-school children audience. It was launched on 1 August 2009 on Sky Italia on channel 602 to replace RaiSat YOYO, which then became free and is now named Rai Yoyo.

From 10 November 2009, Nick Jr. switched to the Channel 603 version.

Since 4 July 2011 of the timeshift service called Nick Jr. +1, which offers the same Nick Jr. programming one hour after the numbering 604.

Since 10 June 2013, together with the timeshift Nick Jr. +1, the channel broadcasts in wide-screen 16:9 and has renewed bumpers, graphics and promos.

On 11 February 2024, Nick Jr. rebranded with the splat logo just a few days after Latin America, Global, Scandinavia and Asia, and a few months after the United States.

On 1 December 2025, the channel made a return to channel 603 on the Sky Italia platform, a move necessitated by the arrival of Disney Jr. onto the satellite lineup. As a direct consequence of this reshuffling, the +1 timeshift version of the channel officially ceased all broadcasting operations.
