= Nickelodeon Global Unlimited =

International children's television channel

Nickelodeon Global (Unlimited)
- Logo used since 1 August 2023 (Note: The logo's wordmark has been in use since 10 February 2010. Additionally, this logo is a variant meant to be used for white backgrounds; the main variant has a white wordmark in conjunction with a fully orange splat.)
- Country: United States
- Broadcast area: Central Europe; Eastern Europe; Balkans; CIS (except Russia, Belarus and Ukraine); Baltics; Malta; Middle East; Africa; Nordic countries; Portugal; Hispanic America; Benelux; France; Monaco; Switzerland; Liechtenstein
- Network: Nickelodeon
- Headquarters: New York, NY

Programming
- Languages: English; Romanian; Croatian; Bulgarian; Serbian; Czech; Hungarian; Slovene; Russian; Estonian; Lithuanian; Latvian; Afrikaans; Amharic; Turkish; Ukrainian; Arabic; Kazakh; Spanish (Latin America); German (Switzerland); Dutch; French (France); Portuguese (Portugal); Swedish; Finnish; Danish; Norwegian
- Picture format: 16:9 576i (SDTV); 16:9 1080i (HDTV)

Ownership
- Owner: Skydance Europe
- Parent: Nickelodeon Group
- Sister channels: MTV Global; Nicktoons Global

History
- Launched: 15 November 1998; 28 years ago
- Replaced: Nickelodeon MENA (in MENA); Nickelodeon Commercial Light (in Hispanic America, Eastern Europe, Benelux, France, Liechtenstein, Monaco, Switzerland and Portugal); Nickelodeon Scandinavia and Nickelodeon Sweden (in Nordic countries)
- Closed: 28 April 2022; 4 years ago (Russia); 14 December 2022; 3 years ago (Belarus); 25 November 2025; 11 months ago (CIS and MENA); 31 December 2025; 10 months ago (Ukraine); 27 January 2026; 9 months ago (Sub-Saharan Africa (except South Africa) and Turkey)
- Replaced by: Nickelodeon Asia (in Middle East, Africa, CIS and Turkey)

Links
- Website: nick.com/global

Availability

Terrestrial
- GO (Malta): Channel 331

Nickelodeon Global (Unlimited) formerly Nickelodeon Europe and Nickelodeon Export is an American-managed specialized children's television channel and the international version of the American Nickelodeon channel. It is owned by Skydance group in Europe, the Middle East, Africa, Asia and Latin America.

== History ==
=== Nickelodeon Export ===
Since the late 1980s, many European countries, including the USSR in 1988, have hosted the American version of the channel, where Nickelodeon became available without translation. This expansion followed the strategy used in 1987 for launching MTV Networks Europe. Viacom (now Paramount) decided against establishing an independent Nickelodeon channel in Europe to minimize risks. On 1 September 1993, Nickelodeon UK was launched in partnership with BSkyB, (now Sky UK), and this version was subsequently distributed throughout the rest of Europe.

=== Nickelodeon Global ===
The pan-European channel was officially launched on 15 November 1998, under the name Nickelodeon Europe, broadcasting around the clock. Between 1998 and 2000, Nickelodeon Europe expanded to Malta, Romania, and Hungary.

In the early 2000s, the channel introduced four programming blocks, Nick Movies, Toons on Toast, Nick Zone, and Nick Double. In 2004, Nickelodeon Europe expanded to the rest of Eastern Europe, including broadcasting in Russian. From May 2004 to 2 October 2012, Nickelodeon Europe served as the main channel in the CIS and Baltic countries.

From 2008 to 2012, the channel experienced periodic technical issues, including audio track problems, which led to certain animated series in English to be broadcast on the channel for some time. During this period, promotional texts were also removed.

On 10 February 2010, a new corporate logo was introduced, aligning with other Nickelodeon channels worldwide featuring the then-new design. That same year, although the broadcasting center remained in London, the channel began broadcasting under a Czech license due to the country's minimum broadcasting regulations.

Between 2010 and 2013, Nickelodeon Europe expanded to the Czech Republic, Slovakia, Croatia, Slovenia, Bulgaria, and Serbia. On 17 September 2011, the channel switched to 16:9 widescreen broadcasting, and on 4 October 2011, it switched to HD format. In some countries, including the CIS, it is referred to as Nickelodeon HD.

In 2013, programming of the channel was taken over by Amsterdam.

In October 2017, audio tracks in Lithuanian, Latvian and Estonian were added for the Baltic States.

On 31 August 2021, Nickelodeon Europe was renamed Nickelodeon Global, the channel now serves 85 countries. Nickelodeon Global retains the Czech license (RRTV) to ensure the continuation of legal broadcasting in the European Union in accordance with the EU Audiovisual Media Services Directive (AVMSD) and the Single Market Law after the UK left the European Union.

On 5 April 2022, a Kazakh audio track was added for Kazakhstan. On 28 April 2022, due to the invasion of Ukraine, the channel in Russia was closed. After leaving Russia, the broadcast of the Belarus and CIS countries was continued. Since December 2022, Nickelodeon Global in Belarus was closed. The channel has once again been the main channel in the Georgia, and CIS countries (except for Russia and Belarus), replacing the local version, Nickelodeon Russia.

On 1 June 2023, a Ukrainian audio track was added, replacing the Nickelodeon Ukraine Pluto TV channel. On 1 August 2023, the channel underwent rebranding, which included an updated logo and new design.

On 25 November 2024, an Arabic audio track was added, replacing the Middle East and North Africa feed.

On 25 November 2025, the Arabic broadcast of the Global feed ended and replaced by Nickelodeon Asia and additionally the Kazakh and Russian broadcasts of the Global feed also ended and replaced by the same feed.

On 31 December 2025, the Ukrainian broadcast of the Global feed ended along with Nick Jr. and Nicktoons channels in the region.

On 1 January 2026, the Spanish, Hungarian, Czech, Slovene, Serbian, Bulgarian, Croatian and Romanian audio tracks were added and weeks later, on 27 January 2026, the Dutch, French and German audio tracks were added, replacing the Nickelodeon Commercial Light in Hispanic America, Eastern Europe, Benelux, France, Liechtenstein, Monaco and Switzerland.. The African and Turkish broadcasts of the Global feed ended and replaced by Nickelodeon Asia.

On 29 January 2026, a Portuguese audio track was added, replacing the Iberian feed in Portugal. This change means Portugal and Spain have separated from each other and Portugal once again receives the same feed as Central Europe for the first time since 2009.

On 5 February 2026, Danish, Norwegian and Swedish audio tracks were added, replacing the Scandinavian and Swedish feeds.

=== Nickelodeon CEE ===
Nickelodeon CEE was launched in early December 2004.
