= Nickelodeon (Spanish TV channel) =

Spanish television network

- Logo used since 2023 (Note: The logo's wordmark has been in use since 2010. Additionally, there is a variant meant to be used for white backgrounds; the main variant has a white wordmark in conjunction with a fully orange splat.)
- Country: Spain
- Broadcast area: Spain, Andorra
- Headquarters: Madrid, Spain

Programming
- Languages: Spanish; English
- Picture format: 1080i (HDTV); 576i (SDTV)

Ownership
- Owner: Skydance Corporation (Skydance Europe)
- Parent: Nickelodeon Group
- Sister channels: MTV Global; Comedy Central

History
- Launched: August 1996; 30 years ago (Spain, as a block on Minimax); March 1999; 27 years ago (Spain, as a TV channel); 1 June 2005; 21 years ago (Portugal)
- Closed: 29 January 2026; 9 months ago (Portugal)
- Replaced by: Nickelodeon Global Unlimited (Portugal)

Links
- Website: Spanish Website (closed)

Nickelodeon is a European pay television channel available in Spain and previously in Portugal, operated by Skydance Europe. The channel is aimed at children and teenagers.

== History ==
During the 1990s Nickelodeon programming was licensed to various commercial broadcasters in Spain and Portugal. In Spain these aired on the paid television channel Canal+, before later being assigned to its spin-off channel Minimax which would launch a block dedicated to just Nickelodeon programming, while in Portugal these were licensed to commercial broadcaster SIC.

The channel was launched in Spain on 27 March 1999 as a localised variant of American kids channel Nickelodeon, on Canal Satellite Digital. Like in the UK, Nickelodeon in Spain originally shared its signal with Comedy Central (at the time known as Paramount Comedy), until February 2005 when both channels were given their own signal.

On 1 June 2005, a feed of the Central European Nickelodeon channel was launched in Portugal with Portuguese audio with partial local ad breaks. The channel was initially an exclusive to the Portuguese TV operator NOS (at the time known as TV Cabo), with this exclusivity being maintained for the following 12 years.

On 1 September 2009, the Portuguese channel changed its source feed to Nickelodeon Spain. On 1 April 2010, Nickelodeon rebranded its graphical package with a new logo and new bumpers. On 22 November 2012, it changed its aspect ratio from 4:3 to 16:9.

On 15 January 2015, an HD version of the Spanish feed of the channel was launched exclusively on satellite provider Canal+ (now Movistar Plus+). The Portuguese feed only received an HD version on 1 February 2024.

In August 2019, Nickelodeon started using promos and bumpers similar to those of Central and Eastern Europe, removing end credits and any bumpers and idents with Portuguese or Spanish text, with the only difference between both feeds now, besides the audio, being the content broadcast during commercial breaks, with Spain broadcasting more commercials while Portugal aired shorts created by third parties such as Glumpers, ZellyGo or Chop Chop Ninja, or even brief clips from some Nickelodeon shows, to compensate for the time allocated for the commercials in Spain.

On 1 December 2017, Nickelodeon started to be carried by Portuguese TV provider Nowo, breaking its exclusivity with NOS. On 31 March 2020, Nickelodeon began to be carried by Portuguese TV provider Meo, and on 14 April 2020, Nickelodeon was launched on Vodafone Portugal, with the channel finally becoming available on all Portuguese TV providers. On the morning of 15 February 2021 however, Nickelodeon became unavailable on Nowo, alongside other Paramount owned channels available on the operator.

Between 2020 and 2023, a video on demand service called Nick+ was made available in Portugal, by the operators Meo and Vodafone. The service would be discontinued due to the launch of SkyShowtime, which serves as the country's equivalent to Paramount+.

On 29 January 2026, Nickelodeon in Portugal fully disconnected from the Iberian feed and transitioned into Nickelodeon Global Unlimited, once again having the same signal as Central Europe. As a result, all third party shorts were pulled from the Portuguese feed at the beginning of the year. Spain was not affected by this change.

== Former programming blocks ==
=== Noches Nick ===
Noches Nick was a night time programming block on Nickelodeon Iberia and was a localized variant of the American version of the block Nick@Nite. Not much is currently known about this block.
