= Nicktoons Global =

European children's television channel

- Logo used since 20 May 2024
- Country: United Kingdom
- Broadcast area: Scandinavia; Balkans; Central Europe; Eastern Europe; CIS
- Headquarters: London, UK

Programming
- Languages: English; Dutch; German; Polish; Czech; Danish; Hungarian; Norwegian; Russian; Romanian; Bulgarian; Serbian; Croatian; Slovenian; Swedish; Turkish; Estonian; Latvian; Lithuanian; Kazakh; Ukrainian
- Picture format: 16:9 1080i HDTV (downscaled to 16:9 576i for the SDTV feed)

Ownership
- Owner: Skydance Europe and Africa
- Parent: Nickelodeon Group
- Sister channels: Nickelodeon; Nick Jr. Channel; MTV Global

History
- Launched: 1 March 2012; 14 years ago (Germany and Netherlands); January 2017; 9 years ago (Estonia, Latvia and Lithuania); February 2017; 9 years ago (Nordic and Türkiye); 15 February 2018; 8 years ago (Poland); 12 December 2018; 7 years ago (Russia); 1 April 2019; 7 years ago (Hungary and Romania); 5 June 2019; 7 years ago (Bulgaria); 30 October 2019; 7 years ago (Czech Republic); 1 December 2019; 6 years ago (Moldova); 22 January 2020; 6 years ago (Ukraine); 14 July 2020; 6 years ago (Serbia, Croatia, Slovenia, Albania)
- Closed: 28 April 2022 (Russia); 14 December 2022 (Belarus); 1 January 2026 (Ukraine)

Nicktoons (sometimes called Nicktoons Europe) is a European international children's television network operated by Skydance Europe and Africa. Launched on 1 March 2012, it's the international version of the American television channel Nicktoons. The network serves many of the countries in the European Union, and features several feeds differentiated by time zones and local languages being the primary audio feed offered, with other languages offered through second audio program options. Other networks may display the domestic language as open-access subtitles.

== History ==
On 1 March, 2012, Nicktoons Global was created by merging Nicktoons Germany and Nicktoons Netherlands. The channel launched in Germany and Netherlands.

In January 2017, a Russian audio track was added for the Baltics (the channel appeared in the CIS in 2018). In February 2017, the channel was expanded by adding audio tracks in Swedish, Danish, Norwegian, Arabic, and Turkish for the respective countries.

The channel launched in Poland on 15 February 2018 at 10 a.m. (Polish time), replacing Nickelodeon HD.

On 12 December 2018, Nicktoons launched in Russia, then in Hungary and Romania on 1 April 2019, in Bulgaria on 5 June 2019, in Czech Republic on 30 October 2019, in Ukraine on 22 January 2020, and in Serbia, Croatia, Slovenia and Albania on 14 July 2020.

The channel closed in Russia on 28 April 2022 and in Belarus on 14 December 2022.

On 1 April 2023, Nicktoons launched three new feeds in Estonia, Latvia and Lithuania, a month before Latvia changed the law on language possibilities.

On 1 January 2026, the channel closed in Ukraine along with Nick Jr. and Nickelodeon channels in the region.

== Logos ==
1 March 2012 until 1 February 2017

1 February 2017 until 20 May 2024

from 20 May 2024

== See also ==
- Nicktoons (American TV channel)
- Nickelodeon Global Unlimited
