= Paramount Networks EMEAA =

Television company

Paramount Networks Europe, Middle East, Africa & Asia
- Final logo, used from 2022 to 2026
- Formerly: MTV Networks Europe (1987–2011); Viacom International Media Networks Europe (2011–2019); ViacomCBS Networks EMEAA (2019–2022)
- Type: Division
- Industry: Television
- Founded: 1 August 1987; 39 years ago
- Defunct: 6 October 2026; 46 days ago
- Fate: Absorbed by Warner Bros. Discovery Asia-Pacific and Warner Bros. Discovery EMEA
- Successor: Skydance Asia-Pacific, Middle East, and North Africa; Skydance Europe and Africa
- Headquarters: Madrid, Spain
- Area served: Europe; Middle East; Africa; Asia
- Products: Television channels
- Parent: Skydance International Content and Distribution

Paramount Networks EMEAA was a Spanish-based division of Skydance International Networks (representing its media operations across Europe, the Middle East, Africa, and Asia) which is fully owned by Skydance Corporation. The unit's headquarters was located in Madrid, with additional offices in Berlin, Lisbon, Paris, Amsterdam, Milan, Dubai, Johannesburg, Lagos, Budapest, Warsaw, Singapore, Stockholm, Tokyo, Beijing, Manila, Copenhagen, Prague, Helsinki, and Hong Kong. The company was originally founded under the name MTV Networks Europe in 1987.

In 2011, the division was renamed Viacom International Media Networks Europe. Also in 2011, Viacom created an Italian subdivision in order to purchase a 30% ownership stake in the Rainbow S.p.A. animation studio until it sold the stake in 2023.

It operated in 31 countries across Europe, Africa and the Middle East.

Its dissolution began on 1 January 2026 with the closure of the regional divisions of Africa, Northern Europe, Middle East, Eastern Europe, Asia and Southern Europe, and was completed on 6 October 2026 through the acquisition of Warner Bros. Discovery by Paramount Skydance Corporation.

== Divisions ==
=== Paramount Networks Northern Europe ===
Paramount Networks Northern Europe (formerly ViacomCBS Networks Northern Europe and Viacom International Media Networks UK, Northern and Eastern Europe) was a regional division of Paramount Networks EMEAA which serves the Germany, Austria, Switzerland, Netherlands, Belgium, Nordic countries (Denmark, Finland, Norway, Sweden), Baltic states (Estonia, Latvia, Lithuania), Hungary, North Macedonia, Romania, Poland, Ukraine, Georgia, Mongolia, and CIS countries.

Its main headquarters was located in Berlin, London and Warsaw, while its regional offices was located in Amsterdam and Stockholm.

Paramount Networks Northern Europe also operated content for MTV's global community (excluding the United States), as well as an array of MTV-branded channels including MTV Music (in Germany, UK & Europe), MTV Hits (in Germany, UK & Europe), MTV Base (in Germany, UK & Europe) and MTV Brand New (in Germany, Belgium, and the Netherlands).

In 2011, VIMN UK, Northern and Eastern Europe realigned its local production operations with music content being produced in Berlin, London, Warsaw, and Stockholm; kids and family programming in London, Berlin, and Warsaw; and comedy content in Berlin, Amsterdam, London, and Warsaw. Amsterdam acts as the technical play-out hub for the majority of Europe, with exception for channels in Germany, Poland and the UK.

It was closed on 1 January 2026, as part of a retrenchment international that entailed massive cost-cutting measures by Paramount Skydance Corporation.

=== Paramount Networks Southern Europe, Middle East, and Africa ===
Paramount Networks Southern Europe, Middle East, and Africa (formerly ViacomCBS Networks Southern Europe, Middle East, and Africa) was a regional division of Paramount Networks EMEAA. The unit's main headquarters was located in Madrid, with additional offices in Lisbon, Paris, Milan, Dubai, Johannesburg & Lagos, Singapore, Tokyo, Beijing, Manila, Prague, and Hong Kong SAR. The selection of multimedia brands that it offered this division varied depending on the country or region.

It was closed on 1 January 2026, as part of a retrenchment international that entailed massive cost-cutting measures by Paramount Skydance Corporation.

==== Paramount Networks Italia ====
In February 2011, Viacom set up Viacom International Media Networks Italia to purchase a 30% ownership stake of the Rainbow S.p.A. animation studio for 62 million euros (US$83 million). The purchase was called "the most significant transaction [in Italian entertainment]" of the year by the Fondazione Ente dello Spettacolo. Viacom originally sought to buy out the entire studio, but eventually decided to keep its founder Iginio Straffi at the helm and left him 70% of the studio. As a result of the purchase, Viacom's Nickelodeon networks broadcast Rainbow's shows worldwide. Viacom Italia has also coordinated co-productions between Nickelodeon's American studios and Rainbow, including Winx Club since 2010 and Club 57 in 2019.

== MTV in EMEAA ==
On 1 August 1987, Viacom formed a joint venture with BT and Robert Maxwell, and created the first MTV channel in Europe. The channel was based in London. From 1997, MTV Networks Europe established its regionalisation strategy launching localised channels across many European countries/regions.

This is a list of regional MTV channels still operating in Europe, Middle East, Africa, Asia in order of launch:

- MTV Global (August 1987)
- MTV Japan (November 1993)
- MTV Taiwan (April 1995)
- MTV Germany (March 1997)
- MTV UK (July 1997)
- MTV Italy (September 1997)
- MTV France (June 2000)
- MTV Poland (July 2000)
- MTV Spain (September 2000)
- MTV Netherlands (September 2000)
- MTV Israel (January 2011)

== MTV branding ==
Upon its launch in Europe in the late 1980s, MTV Europe made use of MTV US's on-air identity. Overtime, MTV Europe gradually produced its own on-air identity throughout the 1990s. From 1997, MTV's regionalization throughout Europe brought about specialized on-air identity which reflected the tastes and influences from each region. As part of a global rebranding strategy, MTV Networks International decided to produce a new on-air identity that would air on all MTV channels around the world (except MTV US, MTV Germany, and MTV Brazil). On 1 July 2009, all 64 MTV channels globally began to share the same on-air branding. This branding made use of a standardised logo, idents and promos (except MTV US, MTV Germany, and MTV Brazil). The on-air branding initiative was called Pop X1000 reflecting the changing nature of popular culture with MTV at the heart of these rapid changes. The branding was designed by MTV's design department World Design Studio in Milan and Berlin with additional designs added by other global departments throughout the year. The branding was overseen by Universal Everything. This branding was adopted by MTV Networks Europe (in Germany), MTV Networks Asia, MTV Networks Africa and MTV Networks Latin America. As part of MTV's rebrand awareness campaign MTV teamed up with Spanish retailer ZARA in December 2009 to provide branded themed T-shirts and hoodies representing the "Pop X 1000%" campaign. On 8 November 2010 MTV launched its third phase of idents.

In 2010, MTV US & MTV Germany rebranded its entire network of channels producing a revised version of the traditional MTV logo. It was decided that MTV Networks International channels would adopt this logo at a later date. On 1 July 2011, MTV Networks Europe rebranded its network across Germany, Europe and globally. MTV replaced its old logo with the then-current MTV US logo. On 30 June 2011, MTV's localized websites throughout Europe began to use the new branding. As part of a new strategy, MTV Networks Europe became part of Viacom Media International Networks in the winter of 2011.

In the fall of 2013, Viacom International Media Networks announced it would relaunch its MTV channels globally with a new on-air identity. This came into effect on 1 October 2013.

On 25 June 2015, MTV International channels were rebranded with a new initiative to get more viewers involved with the channel. MTV launched MTVBump.com where viewers could upload short video clips which will air on MTV channels worldwide (excluding MTV US). MTV also launched MTV Art Breaks where creative viewers can create special MTV idents. MTV would also launch MTV Creative, another initiative to coincide with MTV Bump. However, MTV's rebrand still saw falling ratings.

In early 2018, MTV Global began to roll out 'MTV Mood' identity on-air and online. The new look was first used by local MTV channels across Latin America. MTV Europe began using the new look at the end of 2017 along with MTV Germany, before rolling out across Europe in January/February 2018.

On 14 September 2021, MTV launched a new on-air identity; producing a "unified global brand with space for self-expression", for the first time MTV in the US & German shares the same on-air identity as MTV globally. MTV also introduced its first commissioned font, unique to the channel titled 'Gravity'.

== Websites ==
Since January 2010, MTV Networks Europe has started to rebrand its localized websites featuring a standard website for each region. The website design is similar for each region but has information, news and entertainment specific to each region. MTV Germany, MTV Belgium, MTV Netherlands, MTV Switzerland, MTV Portugal, MTV Sweden and MTV Denmark were the first to receive the new look website layout and design.

A new design and layout were released in late 2017 before rolling out across MTV globally in 2018. A new global design was launched in October 2019. A new global design was introduced in February 2021, with some minor changes to coincide with MTV's global rebrand in September 2021.

== Broadcasting Agreements ==
Paramount International Networks has utilized the broadcasting laws and regulation from both the Germany, United Kingdom and Poland to license and secure broadcasting agreements across Europe, whilst maintaining EU regulation. In the past, the majority of MTV's channels were regulated by authorities based in the Germany & UK (Ofcom) and Germany & Poland (The National Broadcasting Council). However, due to the UK's impending exit from the European Union the company has relocated many of its broadcasting licenses from the UK to regulators based in the Czech Republic (RRTV) and the Netherlands.

Following Brexit, all channels operating in the UK will remain under OFCOM, whilst all other channels operated by Paramount International Networks for the rest of Europe will be regulated from Germany, Poland, Czech Republic and/or the Netherlands. Channels for Ireland, Hungary, Czech Republic and pan-European channels are regulated by RRTV in the Czech Republic. Channels for the Benelux region, the Nordic region, France, Poland, Germany, Switzerland, Austria, Portugal are regulated by authorities in the Netherlands and the remaining channels will be regulated by authorities in the Czech Republic, the Netherlands and/or under a local arrangement with a relevant regulator.

== PIN local offices ==
PIN Europe, Middle East, and Africa had multiple offices across these regions including Berlin, London, Stockholm, Copenhagen, Amsterdam, Rome, Lisbon, Paris, Madrid, Warsaw, Prague, Johannesburg and Sydney.

PIN's European headquarters were in PIN Europe London HQ. The building at 17–29 Hawley Crescent, Camden Town, London NW1 8TT, UK, notably sports an exterior living wall. The wall spans over 300m² and hosts approximately 18,000 plants on two aspects: South and West. The wall provides a microenvironment for many species including the protected snail species Helix pomatia and occasional migratory birds.

=== Structural changes at Paramount Europe ===
==== 2009 ====
Following a successful launch in the Baltic region MTV (see MTV Baltic) ceased trading in the region in 2009 due to the economic downturn across Europe and the wider world.

==== 2010 ====
On 4 November 2010 MTV Networks International offices in Berlin & Amsterdam confirmed that from 1 January 2011 that TMF in the Netherlands broadcasting hours would be reduced until 15:00 each day. From 4 April 2011, TMF was gradually replaced by Kindernet and where the channel was only available online from the former TMF.nl website. On 1 September 2011, TMF in the Netherlands ceased broadcasting. TMF Nederland was the original channel before launching local channels in Germany, Belgium, UK and Australia. These local channels have been replaced with different channels. TMF's digital channels in the Netherlands TMF Live and TMF NL also ceased broadcasting. TMF Flanders in Belgium currently broadcasts as the only TMF channel.

==== 2011 ====
On 16 September 2011, it was confirmed by Viacom International Media Networks its operations in the Nordic countries, Benelux region and Germany would operate under Viacom International Media Networks Northern Europe. VIMN Northern Europe operates from its central offices in Amsterdam, Stockholm and Berlin. Resulting in job losses at its offices from MTV Networks Benelux in Belgium and the Netherlands. The re-alignment will see all music programming come from its operations in Stockholm. Its Swedish offices operate local channels such as MTV and VH1 within VIMN Northern European's portfolio of music channels. All kids and family programming operates from Berlin these include localized versions of Nickelodeon, Nick Jr. Channel and Kindernet. Whilst all the localized Comedy Central channels will be operated from Amsterdam. VIMN North European's portfolio includes the following territories: Netherlands, Belgium, Germany, Austria, Switzerland, Finland, Sweden, Norway and Denmark. MTV's Berlin and Amsterdam offices will remain open and will act as the technical play-out hub for the channels.

==== 2012 ====
In December 2012, both Viacom International Media Networks and ProfMedia announced the closure of MTV Russia. Prof Media who purchased MTV Russia from VIMN in 2007, claimed the MTV brand is no-longer relevant in the territory and will be replaced by a more youth orientated general entertainment brand called 'Friday' on 1 June 2013. MTV Russia is one of the most widely distributed channels in the Russian Federation and was previously rated the most watched channel in the territory. Today, the channel has been relegated to the Top 20 channels in Russia. VIMN stated its commitment to the region stating its other MTV channels and brands such as VH1, Nickelodeon and the newly localized Comedy Central will continue to broadcast across Russia on cable and digital television providers. It has also been stated in some reports that MTV as a brand is in crisis in other Eastern European territories with falling ratings for MTV Poland and other local MTV channels in Central Eastern Europe. This is an ongoing trend for MTV globally. It was reported in the fall of 2012 that MTV US and its other channels had seen a fall in revenue and audience figures. There is competition from on-demand music websites, and MTV's transformation from music oriented television to youth oriented reality and scripted reality shows has failed to ignite the brand. On 31 May 2013, MTV Ukraine ceased broadcasting due to falling ratings.

==== 2013 ====
On 3 July 2013, Viacom International Media Networks launched a localized version of MTV Base in South Africa. MTV South-Africa is an opt-out feed of the same channel with selected unique programming targeting South Africa. On 5 July 2013, VIMN announced it has purchased 51% of MTV Italy the channel was previously a joint-venture largely owned by Telecom Italia Media and VIMN. The ownership conditions have changed which means VIMN holds a larger share of the channel. On 12 September 2013, VIMN Europe announced it has gained 100% ownership of MTV Italia and associated channels from Telecom Italia.

Following the merger of MTV Networks New Zealand and MTV Networks Australia operations into one network based in Sydney in 2010, MTV (Australia & New Zealand) and its sister brand Comedy Central (New Zealand only) were placed under VIMN's – Viacom International Media Networks UK, Ireland, Australia, Central Eastern Europe and International Content Distribution. On 11 October 2013, VIMN's Sydney operations announced it would downsize. From year end all broadcasting is to be relocated to VIMN in London. VIMN's Sydney advertising department and Nickelodeon Australia and New Zealand will not be affected by this move.

==== 2014 ====
From January 2014, MTV Czech Republic & Slovakia will came under full ownership of VIMN Europe. Following a decision by the current operator CME to hand back the licence to VIMN. The channel was replaced by MTV Europe January 2014, with the possibility of the channel relaunching. Similarly, MTV Hungary ceased broadcasting on 31 December 2013. In early 2014, Czech TV regular (RRTV is the licence holder for MTV channels in Eastern Europe) issued MTV Hungary a new licence but this was handed back on 8 January 2014. On 1 August 2015, in Italy MTV Italia (DTT-free to air station) was sold to Sky Italia. In 2013, Viacom took full control of the channel after Telecom Italia Media sold its 51% share. At the same time Viacom launched on the platform of Sky, the new channel MTV Next. Viacom continues to broadcast in Italy through DTT the free-channel MTV Music (Italia) and remains active with Comedy Central, Nickelodeon and Nick Jr. through the platform of Sky Italia. MTV Classic Italia and MTV Hits Italia have been closed down on 1 August.

On 17 November 2015, the French versions of MTV Base, MTV Pulse and MTV Idol were closed and French versions of MTV Hits and BET were launched. The European version of MTV Hits ceased broadcasting in France, Belgium and Switzerland and MTV Rocks ceased broadcasting in Switzerland and CanalSat. On Numericable, VH1 and VH1 Classic returned and MTV Dance was launched.

==== 2016 ====
On 10 January 2016, VIMN shutdown its Greek MTV channel due to a turndown in advertising and competition from MAD TV, the channel was replaced by RISE TV. VIMN Europe confirmed its closure on 6 January 2016. This does not affect the Greek Nickelodeon service.

==== 2017–present ====
In the fall of 2017, VIMN closed plans to close VIVA from German channels in Hungary, Poland, Ireland and the UK. VIMN Germany, Austria and Switzerland confirmed it would reduce the broadcasting hours of the German-speaking VIVA replacing it with an extended version of Comedy Central Germany. By the spring of 2018, VIMN Germany confirmed it would close VIVA in Germany, Austria and Switzerland in January 2019, replacing it with a 24-hour Comedy Central Germany. meanwhile in the UK Nickelodeon, Nick Jr Too and Nicktoons will go 24/7 on 1 January 2019 the same day as the closure of VIVA. MTV Romania shut down in late February 2019, replaced by MTV Europe.

The current EMEAA division was formed when the re-merged ViacomCBS split off its UK channels and combined them with operations in Australia.

In 2021, MTV closed a number of channels across Europe and on March 31, 2022, MTV Classic and MTV Base closed in the UK. Meanwhile, MTV Hungary was closed in April 2022 and MTV Southeast Asia followed it in September 2022. On 7 January 2024, Paramount Networks closed VH1 Italy and on 31 March 2024, VH1 Denmark was closed.

As part of a consolidation process at Paramount Global in January 2025, MTV and Nickelodeon shut down local websites for France, Sweden, Norway, Finland, Denmark, Spain, Portugal, South Africa, Israel, Australia, and Japan, replacing them with the streamlined mtv.com/global site. This rollout will continue in other regions by the end of the year.

== Core brands ==
PIN has many key brands that are available across Europe, the Middle East and Africa. Some brands are specific to different territories.

Pan-European brands:

- MTV
- Comedy Central
- Nickelodeon
- Nick Jr.
- Nicktoons
- Paramount Network
- SkyShowtime

== See also ==
- Paramount Networks Americas
- Paramount Networks UK & Australia
