= Television in the Netherlands =

Television in the Netherlands was officially introduced in 1951. In the Netherlands, the television market is divided between a number of commercial networks, such as RTL Nederland, and a system of public broadcasters sharing three channels, NPO 1, NPO 2, and NPO 3. Imported programmes (except those for children), as well as news interviews with responses in a foreign language, are almost always shown in their original language, with subtitles.

== Reception ==
In the Netherlands, television can be watched analog or digital (the latter with the option of HDTV or UHD). Over 2018, 89.2% of Dutch viewers received television digitally. Analogue television is only available via some cable operators and some fiber to the home providers, since the Dutch government ended analogue reception via airwaves in 2006. Dutch largest cable company Ziggo began to phase out the analogue signal in 2018. Watching digital television is possible through a variety of ways, the most common being:

- Digital television over cable (in most cases through a set-top box with a smart card or through a Conditional-access module).
  - Ziggo is the major supplier of cable television in the Netherlands. Other companies are Caiway, DELTA, Kabelnoord and a few smaller local companies.
- Satellite television
  - Canal Digitaal is the only satellite provider.
- Digital terrestrial television
  - KPN Digitenne is the only terrestrial provider.
- Internet television (IPTV)
  - KPN, Tele2 and T-Mobile are the major suppliers of IPTV.
- Fiber to the home
  - KPN is the major operator of FTTH with its subsidiaries KPN Glasvezel, Glashart and Reggefiber. Other companies are Caiway and DELTA.

Which television channels can be received is heavily dependent on the operator and in most cases also the channel package that is paid for. However, there is a small selection of channels that every operator must carry. Since 2014, these are the following channels:

- NPO 1
- NPO 2
- NPO 3
- VRT 1 (Flanders (Belgium))
- VRT Canvas (Flanders (Belgium))
- Ketnet (Flanders (Belgium))
- Regional (provincial) broadcasters (when available)
- Local broadcaster (when available)

== Public channels ==
The Netherlands has three nationwide channels for publicly funded television (NPO). These channels can only make a fixed maximum amount of money from commercials. These commercials never interrupt broadcasts, and are only shown in between shows. The broadcasting organisations that use these channels are basically representative of the Dutch society. Every broadcasting company has members and the number of members gives them a status that is connected to the number of hours of broadcasting. Acceptance or refusal of entry is decided politically on the guidance of public opinion.

In 2005, there was a sharp political debate over government plans to cut funding to public broadcasters and to abolish statutory broadcaster NPS.

=== National ===
The three national television channels are:

- NPO 1
- NPO 2
- NPO 3
  - NPO Zapp
  - NPO Zappelin

=== Thematic ===
The three digital television channels that are provided by the Nederlandse Publieke Omroep organisation, are:

- NPO 1 Extra
- NPO 2 Extra
- NPO Politiek en Nieuws

=== International ===
There is also an international public channel:

- BVN, It shows the best of Dutch public television for Dutch viewers abroad. It was also formerly shared with Belgium's publicly funded Flemish television channel VRT.

=== Regional ===
Most regions and provinces have their own television channel as well. These also receive government funding:

- AT5 (Greater Amsterdam)
- Omrop Fryslân (Friesland), in West Frisian and Dutch
- RTV Noord (Groningen)
- RTV Drenthe (Drenthe)
- RTV Oost (Overijssel)
- Omroep Flevoland (Flevoland)
- TV Gelderland (Gelderland)
- RTV Utrecht (Utrecht)
- NH (North Holland)
- RTV Rijnmond (Rotterdam)
- TV West (South Holland)
- L1 (Limburg)
- Omroep Brabant TV (North Brabant)
- Omroep Zeeland (Zeeland)

== Commercial channels ==
=== RTL Nederland ===
- RTL 4
- RTL 5
- RTL 7
- RTL 8
- RTL Z
- RTL Crime
- RTL Lounge
- RTL Telekids

=== Talpa Network ===
- Net5
- SBS6
- SBS9
- Veronica
- TV 538

=== Skydance Europe & Africa ===
- Animal Planet
- Cartoon Network
- Cartoonito
- CNN International
- Comedy Central
- Discovery Channel
- Discovery Science
- Eurosport 1
- Eurosport 2
- HGTV
- MTV
- Nickelodeon
- Nick Jr.
- Nicktoons
- Investigation Discovery
- Paramount Network
- TLC

=== The Walt Disney Company ===
- 24Kitchen
- BabyTV (Distribution only)
- Disney Jr, formerly known as Jetix & Disney XD
- Disney Channel
- ESPN (through Eredivisie Media & Marketing CV)
- Star Channel (through Eredivisie Media & Marketing CV)
- National Geographic
- National Geographic Wild

=== VodafoneZiggo ===
- Ziggo Sport
- Ziggo Sport 2
- Ziggo Sport 3
- Ziggo Sport 4
- Ziggo Sport 5
- Ziggo Sport 6
- Ziggo TV

=== AMC Networks International ===
- AMC Networks International UK
  - Extreme Sports Channel
- ShortsTV, joint venture of AMC and Shorts International

=== NBCUniversal International Networks ===
- DreamWorks Channel
- E!
- Sky News

=== Versant ===
- CNBC Europe

=== SPI International ===
- DocuBox
- FightBox
- Film1
  - Film1 Premiere
  - Film1 Action
  - Film1 Family
  - Film1 Drama
- FilmBox+ One

=== BBC Studios ===
- BBC News
- BBC NL

=== A&E Networks ===
- Crime & Investigation
- History

=== Stingray Digital ===
- Stingray Classica
- Stingray Djazz
- Stingray iConcerts
- Stingray Lite TV

=== Muziekkiosk ===
- Nashville TV
- SchlagerTV
- TV Oranje

=== RadioCorp BV ===
- 100% NL TV
- Slam!TV

=== Viaplay Group ===
- Viaplay TV
- Viaplay TV+

=== Canal+ S.A. ===
- Canal+ Action

=== Other ===
The following (international) commercial channels broadcast localized versions of their programs:

- 192TV
- Curiosity Channel
- DanceTelevision
- Duck TV
- Euronews
- Family 7, conservative Christian channel
- FashionTV
- Horse & Country TV
- Love Nature
- Moonbug
- Njam!
- ONS, Dutch Nostalgia Channel
- OutTV, lesbian lifestyle
- Pebble TV, Dutch Children's Channel
- Telegraaf TV
- Top 40 TV
- Xite, Dutch Music Channel
- AFTV-African Television (English), available in The Hague and online, targeting Africans in the Netherlands
- NOS TV (Papiamento), available on Bonaire and online; local Bonaire TV station.
- RTV-7, (Papiamento, English); Rebroadcast of Antillian TV Channels in the Netherlands

== Foreign domestic channels ==
While there are many localised versions of international channels meant for the Dutch market, many television providers also broadcast 'domestic television' networks as part of the basic subscription package. Other 'domestic' channels may be received as part of extended packages. Many basic subscriptions include:

=== Belgium ===
- VRT 1 (Flanders)
- VRT Canvas (Flanders)
  - Ketnet Junior (Flanders)
- Ketnet (Flanders)
- La Une (Wallonia)
- Tipik (Wallonia)
- La Trois (Wallonia)
  - RTBF Auvio Kids TV (Wallonia)

=== United Kingdom ===
- BBC One
- BBC Two
- BBC Three
  - CBBC
- BBC Four
  - Cbeebies

=== Germany ===
- Das Erste
- ZDF
- WDR Fernsehen
- NDR Fernsehen
- RTL
- Sat.1
- 3sat
- Arte Deutschland

=== France ===
- France 2
- France 3
- France 4
  - Okoo
- France 5
- TV5 Monde Europe
- Arte France
- Mezzo

=== Italy ===
- Mediaset Italia
- Rai 1
- Rai 2
- Rai 3

=== Spain ===
- Antena 3
- TVE Internacional

=== Other ===
- TRT Türk (Turkey)
- Al Jazeera English
- CGTN
- Utsav Gold
- Utsav Plus

== High-definition ==
In the Netherlands customers can receive high-definition television channels by cable or satellite. Until 2018 there was no terrestrial HD service available. KPN started to switch its digital terrestrial television platform to the DVB-T2 HEVC standard in October 2018, this transition completed on 9 July 2019.

The first trials with high-definition television in the Netherlands began in 2006 with the broadcast of the 2006 World Cup in HD. After the trial the larger cable companies continued a HD service with a small number of channels such as National Geographic Channel HD, Discovery HD Showcase, History HD, Film1 HD and Sport1 HD. The demand for HD was low because no Dutch network had made the move to HD. Broadcasting in widescreen and the quality of the standard-definition PAL signal was good enough for most people.

Since the 2006 trials, none of the main Dutch networks made the move to HD. This changed in the summer of 2008 when from 1 June 2008 until 24 August 2008, the Netherlands Public Broadcasting (NPO) organisations made their primary channel, Nederland 1 temporary available in HD. This made it possible to broadcast Euro 2008, the 2008 Tour de France, and the 2008 Summer Olympics in HD and additionally allowed them to test their systems before the scheduled launch of their permanent HD service in early 2009. The NPO planned to launch their permanent HD service with HD versions of their three channels Nederland 1, Nederland 2, and Nederland 3. Most of the programming in the early stages consisted of upscaled material from their SD channels as in time more programs became available in HD. Technicolor Netherlands, the company responsible for the technical realisation of the broadcasts of the NPOs television and radio channels, began the summer 2008 test broadcast of Nederland 1 HD in 720p/50 as the European Broadcasting Union (EBU) recommends. During the test period an additional 1080i/25 version of the channel was made available to the cable companies because of quality complaints from viewers. In 2009 the NPO decided to adopt the 1080i/25 HD standard.

The main commercial broadcasting organizations in the Netherlands the SBS Broadcasting Group (Net5, SBS6, Veronica) and the channels of RTL Nederland followed in HD via cable and satellite, using the same HD standard as the NPO.

== Ultra-high-definition ==
The first television channels in 4K UHD were officially launched in the Netherlands in 2017. In April 2017, satellite provider CanalDigitaal added Insight TV 4K UHD in its channel line-up. After more than a year of testing, KPN launched ultra-high-definition television on 1 July 2017, with Xite 4K and Hispasat 4K TV. Eurosport 4K launched in the Netherlands on 5 June 2018. NPO 1 launched its first trials with ultra-high-definition television through KPN, CanalDigitaal and some minor networks on 14 June 2018, using the HLG standard. Ziggo Sport is available in UHD from March 2021.

== Defunct or rebranded channels ==
- 13th Street (30 May 1998 – 1 July 2016)
- Action Now! (16 May 2006 – 31 May 2009)
- A-Tivi (January 2003 – 1 February 2008)
- Adventure One (1999 – 2007), replaced by National Geographic Wild (2007–present)
- BBC Prime (1995 – 2009), replaced by BBC Entertainment (November 2009 – 31 March 2024)
- Boomerang (5 June 2005 – 18 March 2023), replaced by Cartoonito (18 March 2023 – present)
- Brava3D
- The Box/The Box Comedy (1995 – 30 April 2007), replaced by Comedy Central (30 April 2007 – present)
- CineNova (18 May 2000 – 18 May 2005)
- CMT Europe (October 1992 – 31 March 1998)
- Comedy Central Extra (1 November 2011 – 31 December 2022)
- Comedy Central Family (1 October 2008 – 31 May 2018), its programmes merged with Comedy Central Extra
- Consumenten 24 (formerly Consumenten TV)
- DanceTrippin TV (2011 – May 2018), rebranded by DanceTelevision (May 2018 – present)
- Discovery Civilisation (1 October 1998 - 18 April 2008), rebranded by Discovery World (18 April 2008 - 31 December 2020)
- Discovery Travel & Living (September 1999 – 4 July 2011), replaced by Investigation Discovery and TLC (4 July 2011 – present)
- Disney Cinema (1 November 2000 - 30 April 2020) Formerly Toon Disney & Disney Cinemagic
- Disney XD (2 August 1997 - 1 May 2025), replaced by Disney Jr. (1 May 2025 - present)
- ESPN America (5 December 2002 – 1 August 2013)
- ESPN Classic (13 March 2006 – 1 August 2013)
- Euro 7 (19 October 1994 – 28 March 1997)
- Familie 24
- Film1 Sundance (1 March 2012 – 31 August 2017) / Film1 Festival (1 February 2006 – 1 March 2012)
- Filmnet (1984 – 1997), replaced by Canal+ (1997 – 2006), followed by Film1 (1 February 2006 – present)
- Fine Living (1 September 2015 – 31 January 2019)
- Food Network (22 April 2010 – 31 January 2019)
- Fox (19 August 2013 - 31 October 2023), rebranded by Star Channel (1 November 2023 - present)
- Fox Kids (2 August 1995 – 13 February 2005), rebranded by Jetix (13 February 2005 – 1 January 2010) followed by Disney XD (1 January 2010 – 1 May 2025)
- Fox Life (7 September 2009 – 31 December 2016)
- Fox Sports Eredivisie, 3 pay-TV channels (29 August 2008 – 1 January 2021), rebranded by ESPN
- Fox Sports International 3 pay-TV channels (17 August 2013 – 1 January 2021), rebranded by ESPN
- Garuda TV
- Geschiedenis 24 (formerly Geschiedenis)
- GoedTV (April 2006 – 6 December 2015)
- Hallmark Channel (June 1995 – 20 July 2011)
- HBO 1/2/3 (9 February 1990 – 31 December 2016)
- Het Gesprek (2 October 2007 – 22 August 2010)
- JimJam (10 October 2006 – 1 March 2018)
- Kindernet (1 March 1988 –2 September 2003, 4 April 2011 – 1 November 2013)
- Magic Club (13 January 1995 - 1 January 1996)
- Magic Kids (12 January 1995 - 31 October 2006)
- Mannen 24 (2 May 2002 - 10 April 2013) Formerly Men and Motors
- MGM Channel (2001 – 6 November 2014), replaced by AMC (6 November 2014 – 31 December 2018)
- MisdaadNet (1 July 2008 – 1 September 2011), replaced by RTL Crime (1 September 2011 – present)
- Motors TV (1 September 2000 – 28 February 2017), rebranded by Motorsport.tv (1 March 2017 – 30 September 2018)
- MTV 80s (5 October 2020 - 31 December 2025)
- MTV 90s (5 October 2020 - 1 January 2025)
- MTV 00s (2 August 2021 - 31 December 2025)
- MTV Brand New (1 August 2006 - 31 January 2021), replaced by MTV Hits (1 February 2021 - 31 December 2025)
- MTV Hits (27 May 2014 - 31 December 2025)
- MTV Live (15 September 2008 - 1 January 2025)
- MTV Music 24 (1 September 2011 - 26 May 2021), replaced by MTV 90s (26 May 2021 - 1 January 2025)
- NBC Super Channel (30 January 1987 – 30 June 1998), replaced by National Geographic (1 July 1998 – present)
- Nederland 3
- NiCK (1 February 1994 - 12 January 1995)
- Nickelodeon Ukraine
- NickMusic (1 June 2021 - 31 December 2025)
- NostalgieNet (1 January 2006 – 13 September 2015), rebranded by ONS (13 September 2015 – present)
- NPO 3 Extra (31 October 2006 – 25 December 2018), between 2006 and 2014 named 101 TV and between 2014 and 2018 named NPO 101.
- NPO Doc (1 December 2004 as Holland Doc 24 – 1 July 2016)
- NPO Humor TV (15 November 2006 as Humor TV 24 – 1 July 2016)
- NPO Nieuws (1 December 2004 as Journaal 24 ceased on 15 December 2021)
- NPO Sport
- NPO Zappelin Extra (30 May 2009 – 15 December 2021)
- Revolt (1 November 2019 - 31 January 2021)
- RTL-Véronique (2 October 1989 – 17 September 1990), rebranded by RTL 4 (18 September 1990 – present)
- Spike (1 October 2015 - 24 May 2022), rebranded by Paramount Network (24 May 2022 - present)
- Spelshows 24 (formerly Spelshowkanaal)
- Spirit 24 (formerly Geloven)
- Sport 7 (18 August 1996 – 8 December 1996)
- Sportnet (29 March 1984 – 1 March 1993), merged with Eurosport (5 February 1989 – present)
- Sterren 24 (formerly Sterren.nl)
- Stingray Brava (2007 – 1 March 2019), replaced by Stingray Classica (1 March 2019 – present)
- SuperSport (1995 – 1997), replaced by Canal+ (1997 – 2006) followed by Sport1 (1 February 2006 – 12 November 2015), rebranded by Ziggo Sport Totaal (12 November 2015 – present)
- Syfy (30 May 2007 – 1 July 2016)
- TeenNick (14 February 2011 - 30 September 2015), replaced by Spike (1 October 2015 - 24 May 2022)
- The Big Channel (1 February 1990 - 3 September 2001)
- Talpa (13 August 2005 – 15 December 2005), rebranded by Tien (16 December 2005 – 17 August 2007) followed by RTL 8 (18 August 2007 – present)
- TMF (1 May 1995 – 1 September 2011)
- TMF Dance (1 May 2005 – 31 December 2011)
- TMF NL (1 May 2005 – 31 December 2011)
- TMF Pure (1 May 2005 – 31 December 2011)
- TNT Classic Movies (17 September 1993 – 15 October 1999) rebranded by TCM (15 October 1999 – 1 January 2014)
- TNT (24 January 2013 – 1 January 2014)
- Travel Channel (1996 – 31 January 2019)
- TV Noordzee
- TV10 (never launched due to license problems, 1989)
- TV10 Gold (1 May 1995 – 31 January 1996), rebranded a couple of times afterwards. First by TV10 (1 February 1996 – 18 December 1998) followed by FOX (19 December 1998 - August 1999), Fox 8 (September 1999 – 30 April 2001), V8 (1 May 2001 – 19 September 2003) and finally by Veronica (20 September 2003 – present)
- Veronica (1 September 1995 – 1 April 2001), rebranded by Yorin (2 April 2001 – 11 August 2005), and again rebranded by RTL 7 (12 August 2005 – present)
- VH1 (June 1999 - 2 August 2021), rebranded by MTV 00s (2 August 2021 - 31 December 2025)
- VH1 Classic (30 November 2004 – 5 October 2020), rebranded by MTV 80s (5 October 2020 – 31 December 2025)
- Viceland (1 March 2017 – 31 October 2019), rebranded by VICEtv (1 November 2019 – 24 August 2020)
- Vesta TV (October 1995 – July 1996)
- Weerkanaal (15 February 2006 – December 2008), rebranded by Weer en Verkeer (December 2008 – 1 October 2013)
- ZAZ (1 October 1991 - 31 July 2012)
- Ziggo Sport Docu (12 November 2015- 2 July 2024), rebranded by Ziggo Sport 5 (2 July 2024 - present)
- Ziggo Sport Extra (12 November 2015 - 28 February 2021), rebranded by Ziggo Sport Tennis (1 March 2021 - 2 July 2024)
- Ziggo Sport Golf (12 November 2015 - 2 July 2024), rebranded by Ziggo Sport 6 (2 July 2024 - present)
- Ziggo Sport Racing (12 November 2015 - 2 July 2024), rebranded by Ziggo Sport 3 (2 July 2024 - present)
- Ziggo Sport Select (12 November 2015 - 2 July 2024), merged with Ziggo Sport (2 July 2024 - present)
- Ziggo Sport Tennis (12 November 2015 - 2 July 2024), rebranded by Ziggo Sport 4 (2 July 2024 - present)
- Ziggo Sport Voetbal (12 November 2015 - 2 July 2024), rebranded by Ziggo Sport 2 (2 July 2024 - present)
- Zone Club (1998 – 1 April 2010)
- Zone Horror (30 October 2006 – 1 July 2009)
- Zone Reality (10 October 2002 – 2 December 2012), rebranded by CBS Reality (2 December 2012 – 31 December 2023)

== Television in other languages ==
To serve those who have another native language than Dutch, there are few television channels in the Netherlands broadcasting in one of the regional languages of The Netherlands. Those broadcasting in English usually target an international audience as well. Most of these channels broadcast through the internet only or have a very limited broadcasting area, with Omrop Fryslân as most notable exception. These channels are:

- Omrop Fryslân (Frisian), public access regional broadcaster in the province of Friesland
- Froeks.tv (Frisian), web-only channel for Friesland
- Radio Netherlands Worldwide (English), produces vodcasts on their website in English
- ThreeNL (English), reruns of Dutch public access programmes either English subtitled or dubbed
- AFTV-African Television (English), available in The Hague and online, targeting Africans in The Netherlands
- NOS TV (Papiamento), available on Bonaire and online; local Bonaire TV station.
- RTV-7 (Papiamento, English), available on Ziggo, XS4ALL and KPN. Rebroadcast of Antillian TV Channels in the Netherlands

== See also ==
- Digital television in the Netherlands
- History of Dutch television
- Lists of television channels
- List of cable companies in the Netherlands
- Media in the Netherlands
