= 2005 in Dutch television =

This is a list of Dutch television related events from 2005.

== Events ==
- 13 February - 1994 Soundmixshow winner Glennis Grace is selected to represent Netherlands at the 2005 Eurovision Song Contest with her song "My Impossible Dream". She is selected to be the forty-sixth Dutch Eurovision entry during Nationaal Songfestival held at Pepsi Stage Theatre in Amsterdam.
- 12 August - The RTL Nederland rebrand takes place; Yorin becomes RTL 7 and switched from a Dutch licence to a Luxembourgish one.
- 13 August - Talpa launches.
- 22-26 August - Talpa holds De TV Competitie, where viewers voted for pilots from five production companies.
- 27 August - Een goed begin by Endemol becomes the winning pilot of De TV Competitie.
- 15 October - Singer and runner up of the first series of Idols Jim Bakkum and his partner Julie Fryer win the first series of Dancing with the Stars.
- 22 December - Joost Hoebink wins the fifth series of Big Brother.

== Debuts ==
- 20 August - Dancing with the Stars (2005-2009)

== Television shows ==
=== 1950s ===
- NOS Journaal (1956–present)

=== 1970s ===
- Sesamstraat (1976–present)

=== 1980s ===
- Jeugdjournaal (1981–present)
- Het Klokhuis (1988–present)

=== 1990s ===
- Goede tijden, slechte tijden (1990–present)
- Big Brother (1999-2006)
- De Club van Sinterklaas (1999-2009)

=== 2000s ===
- Idols (2002-2008, 2016–present)

== Networks and services ==
=== Launches ===
Network	Type	Launch date	Notes	Source
Nicktoons on Nick	Cable television	Unknown		
Zone Reality	Cable television	Unknown		
Eurosport 2	Cable television	10 January		
Nick Jr.	Cable television	1 May		
TMF Party	Cable television	1 May		
TMF NL	Cable television	1 May		
TMF Pure	Cable television	1 May		
BabyTV	Cable television	4 July		
Tien	Cable television	13 August		
TV Oranje	Cable television	12 November		
Family7	Cable television	10 December		
RT	Cable television	10 December		

=== Conversions and rebrandings ===
Old network name	New network name	Type	Conversion Date	Notes	Source
Fox Kids	Jetix	Cable television	13 February		
Yorin	RTL 7	Cable television	13 August		

=== Closures ===
Network	Type	End date	Notes	Sources
CineNova	Cable television	18 May		

== See also ==
- 2005 in the Netherlands
