= TMF Pure =

Music television channel

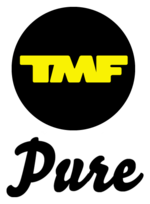
- Country: Netherlands
- Broadcast area: Netherlands; Belgium
- Network: TMF

Programming
- Picture format: 16:9 576i (SDTV)

Ownership
- Owner: Viacom International Media Networks Northern Europe
- Sister channels: TMF; TMF NL; TMF Dance; MTV; MTV Brand New; MTV Music 24; MTV Hits; MTV Rocks; MTV Dance; VH1 Europe; VH1 Classic Europe; Comedy Central; Comedy Central Family; Comedy Central Extra; Nickelodeon; Nick Jr. Nicktoons; Nick Hits; Kindernet

History
- Launched: 1 May 2005; 21 years ago
- Closed: 31 December 2011; 14 years ago

Links
- Website: www.tmf.nl/tv/digital/pure/

TMF Pure was a digital TV channel of MTV Networks Benelux.

The channel launched together with three other digital channels of MTV Networks on 1 May 2005. This channel, TMF NL and TMF Dance were among the first digital theme channels in the Netherlands. On 1 August 2006 TMF Pure was renamed MTV Brand New. This digital channel emits, unlike TMF Pure, non-stop video clips from the alternative rock genre. Besides videos, there are also live performances on MTV Brand New. Since 1 August 2007 the station went on air again, along with two new thematic channels: Nick Hits and Nicktoons. TMF Pure sent nonstop music videos from the genres R&B, rap and hip-hop and came back because The Box (which is focused on the same genre) ceased. After the reintegration of TMF Pure, MTV Brand New continued. All channels of TMF Nederland closed on 31 December 2011.
