= TMF Dance =

Music television channel

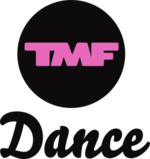
- Country: Netherlands and Belgium
- Broadcast area: Netherlands; Belgium
- Network: TMF

Programming
- Picture format: 16:9 576i (SDTV)

Ownership
- Owner: Viacom International Media Networks Northern Europe
- Sister channels: TMF; TMF NL; TMF Pure; MTV; MTV Brand New; MTV Music 24; MTV Hits; MTV Rocks; MTV Dance; VH1 Europe; VH1 Classic Europe; Comedy Central; Comedy Central Family; Comedy Central Extra; Nickelodeon; Nick Jr. Nicktoons; Nick Hits; Kindernet

History
- Launched: 1 May 2005; 19 years ago
- Closed: 31 December 2011; 13 years ago
- Former names: TMF Party (2005-2008)

Links
- Website: www.tmfdigital.nl/dance

Availability

Streaming media
- TMF.nl: Watch live (closed)

TMF Dance (formerly TMF Party) was a digital theme channel part of MTV Networks Benelux.

The channel, along with the channels TMF Pure, TMF NL, and Nick Jr., launched on 1 May 2005. The purpose of the TMF Dance was to play a nonstop mix of dance music. On 31 December 2011 all TMF channels, including TMF Dance, were closed down due to MTV strengthening its own brand.
