= TMF NL =

Dutch music television channel

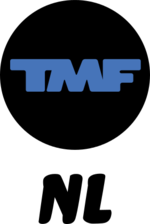
- Country: Netherlands
- Broadcast area: Netherlands; Belgium
- Network: TMF

Programming
- Picture format: 16:9 576i (SDTV)

Ownership
- Owner: Viacom International Media Networks Northern Europe
- Sister channels: TMF; TMF Pure; TMF Dance; MTV; MTV Brand New; MTV Music 24; MTV Hits; MTV Rocks; MTV Dance; VH1 Europe; VH1 Classic Europe; Comedy Central; Comedy Central Family; Comedy Central Extra; Nickelodeon; Nick Jr. Nicktoons; Nick Hits; Kindernet

History
- Launched: 1 May 2005; 19 years ago
- Closed: 31 December 2011; 13 years ago

Links
- Website: www.tmf.nl/tv/digital/nl/

Availability

Streaming media
- TMF.nl: Watch live (closed)

TMF NL was a digital music television channel of MTV Networks Benelux that broadcast on all major digital platforms in the Netherlands and Belgium from 2005 to 2011. The station was presented along with three other digital channels of MTV Networks, namely TMF Pure, TMF Party and Nick Jr., and started on 1 May 2005. The channel only played videos by Dutch artists and was a spin-off of successful Dutch music channel TMF.

The channel, as well as the other activities of TMF Nederland (Netherlands) closed on 31 December 2011.
