= TMF Nederland =

Dutch music channel

TMF Netherlands
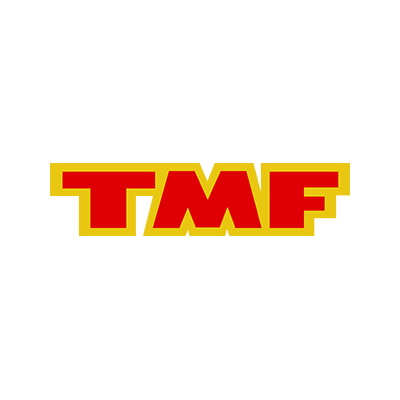
- Country: Netherlands
- Broadcast area: Netherlands
- Headquarters: Amsterdam

Programming
- Picture format: 4:3 576i SDTV (PAL) (1995-2008); 16:9 576i SDTV (2008-2011); 16:9 HDTV (2026- present)

Ownership
- Owner: Paramount Skydance
- Sister channels: MTV; Comedy Central; Nickelodeon; Nick Jr. Nicktoons; Paramount Network

History
- Launched: 1 May 1995; 31 years ago 7 May 2026; 5 months ago (relaunch)
- Closed: 1 September 2011; 15 years ago
- Replaced by: MTV Music 24; Kindernet (as a channel)
- Former names: TMF6 (1995); TMF9 (1995-2002)

Availability

TMF (abbreviation of The Music Factory) is a 24 hour music channel operated by Paramount Global in the Netherlands. The channel was previously in every standard TV package, but it ceased operating on 1 September 2011 which this channel returned on May 7, 2026. The channels operations were based in Amsterdam. The channel was previously known as TMF6 and TMF9.

== History ==
TMF was launched on 1 May 1995 by Lex Harding (then director of Radio 538), producer Herman Braakman, director Ewart van der Horst and multimedia company Arcade. It was the first Dutch music station competing against MTV Europe within the region. The Netherlands did not at that time have its own music station, in most municipalities, only English-language MTV Europe could be received. At first, TMF had a limited reach within the Netherlands, but this quickly increased. The nascent channel featured Sylvana Simons, Bridget Maasland, Isabelle Brinkman, Fabienne de Vries, Ruud de Wild, Michael Pilarczyk, Wessel van Diepen and Erik de Zwart as its VJs. During the years the VJ line-up changed to include Tooske Breugem, Daphne Bunskoek and Mental Theo. The last VJs on the channel included Miljuschka Witzenhausen and Nikkie Plessen.

The first clip that aired on TMF was "Too Much Love Will Kill You" by Brian May.

In the first months of 1995, the station went as TMF6. TMF then had to share a channel on many cable networks with TV10 Gold. TMF sent initially only eight hours a day new programs, from 16:00 to 24:00. During the other hours of the programs were repeated. TMF6 began on May 1, 1995, to broadcast and shared in the early months of a station with the channel TV10 Gold. Both stations were part of media company Wegener Arcade. TMF6 sent out in the afternoon to 6pm; After this time the programming was done by TV10 Gold. Because TV10 Gold gained woefully low ratings, Wegener Arcade developed in the autumn of 1995 a plan for the channel to form in TV10. In that way it had to "repeat channel TV10 its "dowdy" image to get rid. Simultaneously TMF6 should be broadcast on a private news channel.

In 1995 both went SBS6 and Veronica started. Both channels claimed channel 6. blazed a fierce battle between the two stations, which eventually (unofficially) was won by SBS6. Veronica therefore took 6 out of its logo and TMF turned in the autumn of 1995, the number 6, so that the channel TMF9 has been called. After the acquisition by MTV in 2002, the figure 9 from the logo disappeared The station was officially now just TMF. On August 2, 2005 9 came back into the TMF logo but kept the channel still officially called TMF. 9 is probably a counterattack on the Discovery Channel, which was launched action a day earlier in Netherlands to put/get the channel on 9. Also TV Gelderland called to program its viewers the station on preset choice test 9. Later the station was drastically changed with a new style logos, commercials and programs. Here the 9 disappeared.

In the beginning TMF's viewing figures were still very low, but within a few years the figures were higher than those of competitor MTV. Eventually TMF's success in Netherlands mean that also in Belgium, the United Kingdom and Australia a TMF channel was started. From these channels, the Belgian was the only TMF channel which still broadcast, this has also been shut down on November 1, 2015, and was replaced by Comedy Central.

Because of the great success that had TMF took over in 2002 MTV Networks shares on TMF. TMF was from that moment an interactive music station (SMS-based games in video clips) with minimal presentation; almost all VJs and TMF programs were transferred to the (new) Dutch MTV. A policy change was instituted in 2003 and 2004, making a number of programs that were transferred to MTV in 2002, came back again on TMF, including Mental Theo on the Road, presented by Mental Theo, and the Top 40, presented by Jeroen Nieuwenhuize. Both programs, though, are from the tube removed because TMF wanted to get a younger and hipper character.

Despite the launch of a local MTV Netherlands channel within the region in 2000. TMF continued to surpass MTV in audience ratings. To counteract this competition in 2002, MTV Networks Europe purchased TMF's operations in the Netherlands and Belgium. TMF shifted it attention towards more interactive programming, whilst some music programming from TMF was moved to MTV Nederland such as Mental Theo on the Road and Top 40 before moving back to TMF.

With the expansion of digital television TMF launched further brands which included TMF Dance (Techno, Trance and House music), TMF NL (Dutch music) and TMF Pure (R'n'B, Hip-Hop and urban). TMF Live also launched focusing on live music.

In April 2007 there were made more changes at TMF. So there were new programs and was put online a new website in March 2007. As of June 2007 the number was doubled and VJs on July 16, 2007, there is a (re)new(ed) site went into the air. Also, all SMS games disappeared. But the sender sent still simply clips under the same name. With all these changes TMF ultimately develop a new corporate identity to know. Came especially for this occasion on March 7, 2008 Fabienne de Vries, Sylvana Simons, Jeroen Post and Renate Verbaan once back at TMF.

After 2008, TMF's success rapidly decreased. It went further and further downhill with TMF, which from January 1 to April 3, 2011, to see the station was only from 6:00 to 15:00. At other times it was to see Comedy Central (formerly Comedy Central sent out on the channel of Nickelodeon). As a result, some VJs moved to MTV. On April 4 Kindernet took the place of TMF.

From 15:00 pm on April 3, 2011, to September 1 later that year TMF was only seen on the Internet, but again 24 hours a day. On September 1, the channel was (including all digital channels and the internet channel) definitely ceased.

From 1996 to 2011 TMF also organized TMF Awards. The event thus prevailed around 2002, the year in which most VJs had moved to MTV. However, in 2011 with the shutdown of TMF Nederland the TMF Awards are replaced by the Dutch MTV Awards. Even in Belgium, since 2011 there are no more TMF Awards. The disappearance of the channel was easily dismissed by the public, meanwhile, there are many other music channels, especially in the digital package.

== Closure ==
On 4 November 2010 Viacom International Media Networks announced from 1 January 2011 TMF would only broadcast between 06:00 until 15:00 daily. On 4 April TMF was replaced by Kindernet and TMF as brand officially ceased on 1 September 2011 when TMF.nl stopped broadcasting the channel online. VJ's from TMF were transferred to MTV Nederland. TMF's digital channels ceased broadcasting on 31 December 2011.

== Relaunch ==
On 30 April 2020 Erik de Zwart announced that he is working on the return of TMF. He wants to make an online platform of the former music channel.

On 10 April 2026, it was announced that Inn-Picture (who had previously been involved in providing archive material for 192TV.) had acquired the TMF branding from Paramount Skydance Corporation and will be collaborating with Your Channels on reviving TMF as an Over-the-top media service, to be launched on 7 May 2026.

It has been confirmed that over 9000 hours of archival content and 35,000 hours of videoclips from the 90s and 2000s had been digitised for the TMF revival, the launch is set to take place at the studio TMF was originally launched in, Studio Concordia in Bussum.

== VJs through the years ==
Presenters or VJs of the first hour were Sylvana Simons, Bridget Maasland, Isabelle Brinkman, Fabienne de Vries, Ruud de Wild, Michael Pilarczyk, Wessel van Diepen and Erik de Zwart. The four ladies had mentioned a modest hit in the spring of 1997 when the group The Magnificent Four. Later they were replaced under more and completed by Tooske Breugem, Daphne Bunskoek, Mental Theo, Jeroen Post, Sonja Silva and Renée Vervoorn. In 2002 moved many VJs with their programs to MTV. Only the VJs Jeroen Post and Renée Vervoorn remained at TMF. The number of VJs had to remain minimal. Not much later Renée Vervoorn departed too. Later the team was reinforced by Mental Theo. Sylvie Meis came from MTV to TMF and Jeroen Nieuwenhuize came also back to TMF. With a big election "Vote the VJ" has been at the TMF Awards 2004 Renate Verbaan elected new VJ. Sylvie Meis left the VJ team and not much later Miljuschka Witzenhausen strengthen the team. During the TMF Awards 2005 left Jeroen Post and Mental Theo's VJ team. Valerio Zeno joined the VJ team. During the TMF Awards 2006 went Renate Verbaan even at TMF and was replaced by Nikkie Plessen. From June 2007 the VJ team will really be enhanced by Saar, Soumia and Damien. Therefore, there is no longer any question of a minimal presentation. On October 30, 2007, Miljuschka presented her last episode on TMF. She has been replaced since 1 January 2008 by Sascha Visser. On March 18, 2010 Saar Koningsberger made in the TMF program Kijk Dit Nou, known must leave TMF in connection with the Flexwet. On 24 April 2010, she presented her last Kijk Dit Nou. As of 1 December 2010, Sascha Visser also leaves TMF.

=== VJs 1995-2011 ===
- Bridget Maasland (1995–2000)
- Erik de Zwart (1995–2002)
  - Until 2003 VJ at MTV
- Fabienne de Vries (1995–2000)
- Isabelle Brinkman (1995–1998)
- Michael Pilarczyk (1995–1996)
- Ruud de Wild (1995–1998)
- Sylvana Simons (1995–1999)
- Wessel van Diepen (1995–1998)
- Jeroen Post (1996–2005)
- Tooske Ragas (1998–2002)
  - Until 2002 VJ at MTV
- Daphne Bunskoek (1998–2002)
  - Until 2002 VJ at MTV
- Jeroen Nieuwenhuize (1998–2002, 2003–2007)
  - Between 2002 and 2003 VJ at MTV
- Murth Mossel (1999-2000)
- Mental Theo (1999–2002, 2003–2005)
  - Between 2002 and 2003 VJ at MTV
- Sonja Silva (1999–2001)
- Renee Vervoorn (2000–2003)
- Johnny de Mol (2001–2002)
  - Until 2003 VJ at MTV
- Seth Kamphuijs (2001–2002)
  - Until 2005 VJ at MTV
- Kristina Bozilovic (2001–2002)
  - Until 2003 VJ at MTV
- Virtuele Sita (2002-2003)
- Sylvie Meis (2003–2004)
  - In 2002-2003 VJ at MTV
- Renate Verbaan (2004–2006)
- Miljuschka Witzenhausen (2005–2007)
- Valerio Zeno (2005–2008)
- Nikkie Plessen (2006–2008)
- Damien Hope (2007–2008)
- Soumia Abalhaja (2007–2008)
- Saar Koningsberger (2007–2010)
- Sascha Visser (2008–2010)
- Amir Charles (2008–2011) (now on MTV)
- Veronica van Hoogdalem (2008–2011)
- Willem "Willy" de Bruin (2009–2011) (now on MTV)
- Tess Milne (2010–2011) (now on MTV)

== See also ==
- The Music Factory
