= TMF Flanders =

TMF
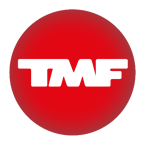
- Country: Belgium
- Broadcast area: Flanders
- Network: VIMN Belgium
- Headquarters: Antwerp

Programming
- Picture format: 16:9 576i (SDTV)

Ownership
- Owner: Viacom International Media Networks Northern Europe
- Sister channels: Comedy Central; Spike; MTV; Nickelodeon; Nick Jr. Nicktoons; Nick Hits

History
- Launched: 3 October 1998
- Closed: 1 November 2015
- Replaced by: Comedy Central going 24 Hours

Links
- Website: www.tmf.be

Availability (channel space shared with Comedy Central)

Streaming media
- Yelo TV: Watch Live
- TV Overal: Watch Live

TMF was a Belgian pay television channel whose programming was centred towards pop music videoclips. TMF was operated by Viacom International Media Networks.

Originally an abbreviation of "The Music Factory", the channel was launched as TMF Vlaanderen in 1998, mainly due to the success of the eponymous Dutch music television channel. The station began broadcasting on 3 October 1998.

The recordings of TMF Flanders occurred mainly in the Eurocam Media Center in Lint, there was until mid-2013 also established the parent company.

== History ==
TMF Flanders was launched on 3 October 1998. In 2004, it changed its Dutch licence for a Flemish one. On 5 October 2015 Viacom announced that TMF would stop broadcasting om 1 November 2015. Thereby two Flemish youth channels (TMF and competitor JIM) disappeared in a short time. From 1 November 2015 Comedy Central took over the whole channel. Thereby the last TMF stopped and the brand completely disappeared.

In 14 October 2023, to celebrate the 25th birthday of the channel, Pickx revived TMF under the name "TMF For A Day".

== See also ==
- The Music Factory
