= MTV Brand New (Dutch TV channel) =

- Country: Netherlands
- Broadcast area: Netherlands
- Network: MTV

Programming
- Picture format: 16:9 576i (SDTV)

Ownership
- Owner: ViacomCBS Networks EMEAA
- Sister channels: MTV; MTV 80s MTV Music 24; VH1; Comedy Central; Comedy Central Extra; Nickelodeon; Nick Jr. Nicktoons; Nick Music; MTV Live HD; Spike

History
- Launched: 1 August 2006; 19 years ago
- Closed: 1 February 2021; 5 years ago
- Replaced by: MTV Hits

Availability (at time of closure)

Streaming media
- Ziggo GO: ZiggoGO.tv (Europe only)

MTV Brand New was a 24-hour specialist music channel featuring new music videos, alternative and indie music available in the Netherlands. An Italian version of the channel launched on September 14, 2003. It also launched in Germany in 2011.

== History ==
First logo of MTV Brand New (Benelux) used until 2011

MTV Brand New was derived from the hit pan-European MTV music show brand:new which launched in 1999 on MTV's regional channels. The show was known as mtv:new or brand:new on MTV. The show focused primarily on new music releases, cutting edge music videos, introducing new artists and bands, interviews and live performances. The programme was turned into a stand-alone music channel in Italy in 2003. Since then MTV Networks Europe has begun to roll out localized Brand New channels gradually.

In 2006, the flagship program became a stand-alone channel in the Netherlands and Flanders featuring new music videos, alternative, punk and rock videos 24 hours a day without any commercial breaks. In the evening the channel also broadcasts MTV Live shows as well. The channel kicked off on KPN IPTV network, Caiway Cable television, UNET Fiber to the Home network and @Home Cable television on August 1, 2006. Followed by UPC Netherlands on October 5, 2006.

The channel was previously available in Belgium.

The channel identity was designed by Dutch creative studio PostPanic.

On 1 February 2021, the channel was replaced by MTV Hits.

== See also ==
- MTV
- MTV Music 24
- MTV Live
- VH1
- VH1 Classic
