= Nickelodeon (Flemish TV channel) =

Flemish television channel

- Country: Belgium
- Broadcast area: Flanders

Programming
- Language: Dutch
- Picture format: 1080i HDTV (downscaled to 16:9 576i for the SDTV feed)

Ownership
- Owner: Skydance Corporation
- Parent: Nickelodeon Group
- Sister channels: Nick Jr. Nicktoons; MTV; French MTV; Comedy Central; French-language Nickelodeon

History
- Launched: 2009; 17 years ago

Links
- Website: www.nickelodeon.be

Availability

Streaming media
- Yelo TV: Watch live
- Pickx: Watch live

Nickelodeon is a Belgian television channel that is derived from Nickelodeon Netherlands. The channel started in the summer of 2009 when it got its own programming. The Dutch version still airs via satellite.

== History ==
=== Launch in the Netherlands ===
Shortly after the Dutch children's channel Kindernet was taken over by MTV Networks Benelux in 2002, the station was renamed Nickelodeon. Kindernet was then still temporarily the name of a toddler block in the morning, but after a while it was renamed Nick Jr. The channel also moved from timesharing with Net5 to another television channel, Veronica.

Initially Nickelodeon took care of the daytime programming, while Veronica was responsible for the evening programmes. However, due to Veronica's low viewing figures, the station started broadcasting a lot of sex-related programmes, with the result that the programme Councils of Groningen/Drenthe and Amsterdam, among others, decided to take the station off cable.

As of 14 July 2003, Veronica stopped broadcasting in this form and Nickelodeon started broadcasting 24 hours a day. In these extra hours a limited number of but popular cartoons were broadcast: SpongeBob SquarePants, Rocket Power and The Wild Thornberrys. From 2004 Nickelodeon started to gain popularity, with series like Zoop and SpongeBob SquarePants, but also Bassie and Adriaan scored tremendously well.

=== The start of Nickelodeon and its sister channels in Flanders ===
On 1 April 2003, the Dutch version of Nickelodeon started broadcasting in Flanders from 06.00 to 11.00 on TMF's channel under the name Nickelodeon on TMF. Because of Belgian legislation prohibiting TV stations from advertising five minutes before and after a children's programme, the station broadcast video clips between programmes. Incidentally, this legislation is no longer in force.

On 16 February 2004, Nickelodeon moved from TMF to the MTV Europe channel and extended its broadcasting hours from 06.00 to 18.00, timesharing with the new MTV Vlaanderen.

In December 2005 Nickelodeon got its first digital sister channel for the Netherlands: Nick Jr. The channel focuses on the very youngest and broadcasts day and night. The Belgium feed was launched on 4 October 2011.

Because Nickelodeon moved to another channel in the Netherlands, the broadcasting time was extended by 3 hours. Since then Nickelodeon has been broadcast from 05.00 to 20.00 in both the Netherlands and Flanders. In Flanders, the remaining broadcast time was taken up by MTV Vlaanderen (then still the Dutch version with Flemish advertising).

On 1 August 2007, due to the success of MTV Networks, two new Nickelodeon channels were launched: NickToons and Nick Hits.

=== Nickelodeon Flanders became independent ===
Since mid-summer 2009 Flanders got its own version of Nickelodeon. It started with some programs to change from the original Dutch version. After the summer this was undone, but here and there some changes were made.

Since 1 October 2009 the programmes are announced in Flemish, also the advertising time is completely Flemish since then. Nick Jr. is still announced in Dutch. Nowadays the Flemish programming differs enormously from the Dutch.

On 31 March 2010, Nickelodeon got a new look. The new Nickelodeon logo was introduced in the United States at the end of September 2009. In France and Wallonia, the new style was inaugurated on 16 January. Nick Jr. and NickToons had also adopted the logos of their American version. The Nick Hits logo consists of an orange Nick and a purple Hits, where the i differs from those used in Nick.

=== Partnership with SBS Belgium and Nickelodeon Flanders in HD ===
From 4 October 2011, MTV Flanders obtained its own channel, and Nickelodeon will fill in the hours throughout the day. It was replaced by TeenNick, broadcast from 20:00, in contrast to the Netherlands where the block only starts at 21:00. Again, the teen block will offer programs in English with Dutch subtitles. Nick Jr. will be part of the basic offer at Telenet.

On 23 August 2011, MTV Networks announced that it had entered into a commercial partnership with SBS Belgium. Since 1 January 2012, SBS Belgium is responsible for the commercialization of MTV, TMF, Nickelodeon and Nick Jr. in Flanders.

On 5 November 2012, Nickelodeon has chosen to change the programming a little. The most important decision is that TeenNick will start at 21 instead of 20 hours. From then on Nickelodeon will broadcast the international version of The House of Anubis: House of Anubis.

Since the beginning of September 2015 the SD version of Nickelodeon has been replaced by the HD version at Telenet. Nickelodeon was broadcasting in HD in Flanders for the first time.

=== TeenNick stops, replaced by Spike ===
In August 2015, it was announced that TeenNick would be discontinued as of 1 October 2015. Since 1 October 2015, Viacom channel Spike is broadcast on the Nickelodeon channel between 9pm and 02.30 am. From 19 to 30 September 2015, TeenNick's hours were reduced to 2.30am The hours between 2.30am and 5am have since been taken by Nickelodeon.

Since 12 December 2016 there are changed hours for Nickelodeon. Nickelodeon starts at 5.00am instead of 2.30am and in the evening Nickelodeon ends a little later, at 9.05pm instead of 9.00pm.

Spike was shut down in Flanders on 6 January 2021, Nickelodeon airs now 24h/24.

== Timeshare ==
	05:00	06:00	11:00	18:00	20:00	21:00	02:30
1 April 2003 to 15 February 2004	TMF	Nickelodeon	TMF
16 February 2004 to 15 December 2006	MTV	Nickelodeon		MTV
16 December 2006 to 3 October 2011	Nickelodeon				MTV
4 October 2011 to 4 November 2012	Nickelodeon				TeenNick
5 November 2012 to 18 September 2015	Nickelodeon					TeenNick
19 September 2015 to 30 September 2015	Nickelodeon					TeenNick	Nickelodeon
1 October 2015 to 11 December 2016	Nickelodeon					Spike	Nickelodeon
12 December 2016 to 6 January 2021	Nickelodeon					Spike

== Sister channels ==
- Nick Jr.: For preschoolers. Available in Flanders via Proximus TV, and in the basic offer of Telenet.
- Nick Toons: Transmits 24h/24 Nickelodeon cartoons. The channel is available in Flanders via Proximus TV and Telenet TV.
