= 1996 in Dutch television =

This is a list of Dutch television related events from 1996.

== Events ==
- 3 March - Maxine & Franklin Brown are selected to represent Netherlands at the 1996 Eurovision Song Contest with their song "De eerste keer". They are selected to be the thirty-eighth Dutch Eurovision entry during Nationaal Songfestival held at Cinevideo Studio in Almere.
- Unknown - Edsilia Rombley wins the twelfth series of Soundmixshow, performing as Oleta Adams.

== Debuts ==
- 11 March - Goudkust (1996-2001)

== Television shows ==
=== 1950s ===
- NOS Journaal (1956–present)

=== 1970s ===
- Sesamstraat (1976–present)

=== 1980s ===
- Jeugdjournaal (1981–present)
- Soundmixshow (1985-2002)
- Het Klokhuis (1988–present)

=== 1990s ===
- Goede tijden, slechte tijden (1990–present)

== Networks and services ==
=== Launches ===
Network	Type	Launch date	Notes	Source
Zomer TV	Cable television	1 June		
Sport 7	Cable television	18 August		
Sci-Fi Channel	Cable television	1 October		
TV Gelderland	Cable television	1 November		

=== Conversions and rebrandings ===
Old network name	New network name	Type	Conversion Date	Notes	Source
European Business News	CNBC Europe	Cable television	11 March		

=== Closures ===
Network	Type	End date	Notes	Sources
VTV	Cable television	1 July		
Sport 7	Cable and satellite	8 December		

== Deaths ==
Date	Name	Age	Cinematic Credibility
3 July	Pim Jacobs	61	Dutch pianist & TV presenter
