= The Music Factory =

Belgian and Dutch music video channel

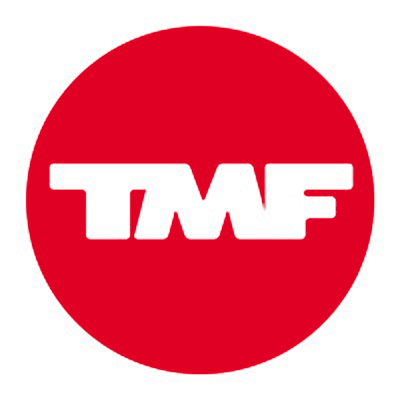
Logo of the Flemish TMF channel

The Music Factory (TMF) was originally a Dutch brand of television and radio channels, which focused on pop music. It was similar to the American MTV which took over TMF in 2002.

TMF operated channels in the Netherlands (TMF Nederland) as well as in the UK with TMF UK and Australia with TMF Australia. The brand is owned by MTV Networks International (part of the Viacom conglomerate). It shows only pop videos and locally produced live programming in Belgium. Likewise, with TMF Netherlands before its closure, the British TMF aired some of MTV's and VH1's programmes like Cribs, Newlyweds: Nick and Jessica, Hogan Knows Best and Run's House.

The channel operated until 26 October 2009 in the UK and Ireland, 1 September 2011 in the Netherlands and 1 November 2015 in Belgium. Viacom International Media Networks, the international arm of Viacom, owns the brand.

== TMF Nederland ==
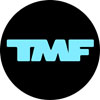
Logo of TMF Nederland.

TMF Nederland was launched on 1 May 1995 as the only local pop station in the Netherlands. It was founded by Lex Harding and the Arcade company. The station gradually began to get better viewer figures than MTV, so in 2002, MTV bought shares in TMF. Since 1996 headquartered in Bussum, the channel was notable for its dance music mixes. In 2005, three new channels, plus a radio station began broadcasting in the Netherlands under the TMF brand:

- TMF Dance - specialised in German, British, French, Belgian and Dutch trance and house music. Formerly known as "TMF Party".
- TMF NL - specialised in local Dutch music.
- TMF Pure - specialised in Soul, and R&B music.
- TMF Hit Radio - Launched on 27 December 2006 and later dropped the TMF branding which soon after became 'Hit Radio'

On 1 September 2011, TMF Nederland ceased broadcasting in the Netherlands entirely, and on 31 December 2011 all digital channels ceased operations.

On 7 May 2026, TMF Nederland relaunched as a FAST channel. The service is provided through Samsung TV Plus and the 192tv app at launch.

== TMF Flanders ==
TMF Flanders (TMF Vlaanderen) was the first international extension of the TMF brand, broadcast to viewers in the Belgian region of Flanders. TMF Flanders first day on air was October 3, 1998. TMF Flanders was the first Flemish-specific channel that was dedicated to video clip broadcast. VJs at the beginning included Stijn Smets, Yasmine, Inge Moerenhout and Katja Retsin. In the early few years, the broadcasts of TMF Flanders were conducted from the same Dutch studio facility that operated TMF Netherlands.

Until 2010 its broadcast were entirely in Dutch with local Flemish presenters. From the start, TMF Flanders is being distributed via cable-TV (analog and/or digital) and IPTV. Founded in 1998, its headquarters were in Mechelen but moved to Lint and later (after the re-alignment of VIMN Northern Europe) to Antwerp (local office) and Stockholm (channel operations). It is the sole TMF channel that is currently still in operation, but it has dropped all its presented programs in 2012. Since 2014 Comedy Central airs on its channel after 10pm. On November 1, 2015 TMF Vlaanderen ceased broadcasting. The channel was replaced by Comedy Central Vlaanderen, ending the TMF-era. In 2007, a second channel was launched and began broadcasting under the TMF brand:

- TMF Live HD - specialised in live music.

On 31 July 2010, TMF Live HD ceased operations.

On 1 November 2015, TMF Flanders ceased broadcasting in Belgium entirely, making Comedy Central a 24 hours channel.

== TMF UK & Ireland ==
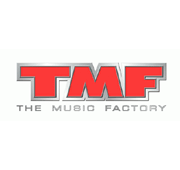
Logo of TMF Australia and TMF UK & Ireland

TMF launched on 30 October 2002 as a counter against EMAP's The Hits request music channel on Freeview. The channel was also available on Sky Digital and Virgin Media. The channel, alongside its music output, showed reruns of successful MTV and VH1 shows such as Pimp My Ride, Jackass and Cribs. There was also a Noggin strand in the morning for pre-school children.

On Mondays, TMF used to broadcast The Official UK Top 40 narrated by Phil Clifton, a day after it was broadcast on BBC Radio 1. The show featured videos of the singles of the previous week and charts their position in terms of record sales. On 26 October 2009, TMF UK & Ireland was replaced with the UK version of VIVA.

== TMF Australia ==
MTV Networks Australia launched a local version of TMF as a fully integrated, multi-platform 24-hour music channel in May 2007. TMF focused on the interactive playground and along with a selection of music video clips including programming and viewer-generated content including images, videos, text-based applications and graphics. Furthering the connectivity between the platforms, TMF was the first music channel in Australia to seamlessly connect all platforms as well as simulcast to mobile 24 a day via the Optus Zoo mobile portal launched in September 2007.

However, in November 2010, TMF Australia was replaced with an Australian version of MTV Hits.

== TMF Awards ==
The channel organized an annual music award show, the TMF Awards, in the Netherlands and Belgium. In addition, there were the TMF Game Awards, an annual awards show for games.
