= Comedy Central (Belgian TV channel) =

- Country: Belgium
- Broadcast area: Flanders
- Network: Comedy Central
- Headquarters: Amsterdam, Netherlands

Programming
- Picture format: 1080i (HDTV); 16:9 576i (SDTV)

Ownership
- Owner: Paramount Networks EMEAA
- Sister channels: MTV; Nickelodeon; Nick Jr. Nicktoons; Nick Hits

History
- Launched: 20 January 2014; 12 years ago

Links
- Website: www.comedycentral.be (closed)

Availability

Streaming media
- Telenet TV: Watch Live
- Proximus Pickx: Watch Live

Comedy Central is a Belgian television channel based on the American channel of the same name. Comedy Central has been several years in Europe with broadcasters in the Netherlands, Germany, Sweden, Poland, Italy, United Kingdom and Hungary. The channel broadcasts mainly of comedy, in the form of animation, series, movies and stand-up shows. In Belgium, the channel started on Monday, January 20, 2014, with the broadcast of a program block on the TMF channel, every day from 22 hours to 24 hours. The channel is available on cable, digital terrestrial and IPTV operators in Flanders. It aired between 10 pm and midnight on the channel of music channel TMF. As of November 1, 2015, it broadcasts 24 hours a day.

Comedy Central is owned by Paramount International Media Networks Benelux. The ad sales are handled by Ads & Data.
