= ONS (TV channel) =

- Country: Netherlands
- Broadcast area: Netherlands; Flanders
- Headquarters: Hilversum, Netherlands

Programming
- Picture format: 1080i HDTV (downscaled to 16:9 576i for the SDTV feed)

Ownership
- Owner: Bureauvijftig

History
- Launched: 1 January 2006; 19 years ago
- Former names: NostalgieNet (2006-2015)

Links
- Website: www.kijkbijons.nl

Availability

Terrestrial
- Digitenne: Channel 25 (01:00-06:00)

Streaming media
- Ziggo GO: ZiggoGO.tv (Europe only)

ONS (formerly NostalgieNet) is a Dutch commercial television channel owned by Bureauvijftig, which is dedicated to viewers aged 50 years or older. ONS's main target is the older audience. ONS airs footage from the forties to the eighties. Each month a specific theme is on the channel. Topics such as the Dutch East Indies, Netherlands Waterland, railroads, mills, work, food and household are broadcast. The channel launched as NostalgieNet on 1 January 2006 and changed its name into ONS on 13 September 2015. On 1 January 2020, Bureauvijftig took over ONS from Just Media Group. ONS is available in HD through Ziggo since 10 February 2022.

ONS can be received through Ziggo, KPN, Caiway, KBG, Canal Digitaal, CAI Harderwijk, Glashart Media and HSO in the Netherlands, and through TV Vlaanderen in Flanders.

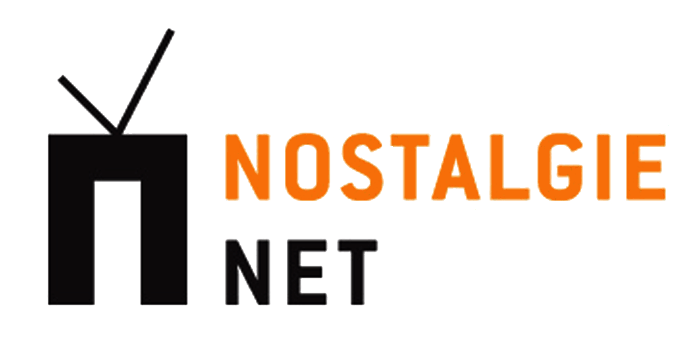
ONS's old logo as NostalgieNet

== Programs ==
ONS broadcasts include the following programs:

Program	Rough translation	Description
Een bijzonder jaar	A Special Year	A series of programs that provide an overview of everything that happened in a specific year and discusses subjects in the areas of politics, sports, culture and other news.
Mijn Nostalgisch Nederland	My Nostalgic Netherlands	A series of nostalgic programs about cities and regions in the Netherlands, including Amsterdam, Rotterdam, The Hague, South Limburg, the Achterhoek, West Friesland and Groningen.
Nederland Toen	Netherlands Back Then	An anthology of Polygoon fragments, with the distinctive voice of Philip Bloemendal as commentator. Themes such as transport, household, fashion and sports.
Retourtje Toen	Return Ticket Back Then	A series of programs on a specific topic with people looking back on their personal experiences of the past, with topics such as fashion, aviation, music, sport, education and vacation.
Natuur in beeld	Nature on Screen	A series on nature in the Netherlands.
Spoor door het verleden	Track Through the Past	A series about trains and trams in the Netherlands.
Ontdek je plekje	Discover Your Place	Idyllic images of cities and villages in the Netherlands, commented by Joop Scheltens.
Kluchten	Farces	Different farces (comedies) like Daar komt de bruid, Ik slaap wel op de bank and Oscar.

Additionally ONS's television broadcasts include De Dageraad, Sil de Strandjutter and Portret van een Passie. On Wednesdays Dutch films, like Het meisje met den blauwen hoed, De dijk is dicht and Kort Amerikaans.

Furthermore, ONS airs a number of old comedy and drama productions in English / American, such as 'Allo 'Allo!, Are You Being Served?, Hi-de-Hi!, Keeping Up Appearances, Ballykissangel, Please, Sir!, Bewitched, Doctor Who, The Love Boat and Miss Marple. The channel also airs Schlager .
