= MTV (Belgium) =

MTV Belgium
- Logo used since 14 September 2021

Programming
- Picture format: 1080i HDTV; 576i SDTV (16:9)
- Timeshift service: Nickelodeon (Netherlands & Flanders) (February 2004 - 3 October 2011)

History
- Launched: 16 February 2004

Links
- Website: MTV.BE

MTV Belgium was the Flemish version of the namesake American television channel. The channel's audience is somewhat older than that of The Music Factory (TMF) and focuses more on alternative music. In spring 2021, MTV Netherlands and MTV Belgium were merged into one channel - MTV Nederland and België.

== Local Programming ==
- MTV Now (3 minutes news and entertainment report hosted by local VJ)

== MTV Europe ==
MTV Europe began broadcasting in Dutch 1987. Prior to 1987, the network's programs featured European video jockeys (VJ) who presented in English. Belgian singer, writer and media personality, Marcel Vanthilt, was an MTV Europe VJ from 1987 to 1990, and was well-known for the MTV programme, Cokes & Vanthilt.

== MTV Netherlands ==
In February 2004, MTV Europe was replaced by MTV Netherlands on Flemish pay television. Unlike its country of origin, MTV Netherlands did not broadcast 24 hours per day in Belgium, but presented Dutch content with intermittent Flemish advertising. In addition to international produced shows, there are two local shows running on MTV Flanders; a Dutch version of Ridiculousness and the Dutch-Flemish version of Ex on the Beach.

== Audience ==
MTV Networks claims that MTV Flanders, together with TMF and Nickelodeon, reaches 2.3 million households daily. The company states that it aims to deliver "strong and relevant content" to its core audience via various multimedia platforms.
