= Touwfabriek Langman =

Touwfabriek Langman, BV
- Industry: Rope making
- Founded: 1638
- Headquarters: Nijkerk, Netherlands
- Website: www.langmanropes.com

Touwfabriek Langman (Langman Ropes) is one of the oldest rope making companies in Europe.

The company is based in Nijkerk, Netherlands.

== History ==
The company was founded in 1638 in Nijkerk, Netherlands. They originally made ropes from hemp and flax, mainly for use in the fishing and farming industries. In 1893, the company was sold by Evert van Sweden to Lebbert Langman. It has been run by members of the Langman family since then.

== In popular culture ==
The company supplied ship ropes for the Pirates of the Caribbean series of movies.

== See also ==
- Ropewalk
- List of oldest companies

External videos
- 1970 Newsreel report from Polygoon newsreel (Dutch language) (republished via YouTube by Touwfabriek Langman)
- 1982 TV segment from Van gewest tot gewest (Dutch language) (republished via YouTube by Touwfabriek Langman)
