= Filip De Groeve =

Belgian pharmacist and author

- Occupations: Pharmacist, author, speaker
- Known for: Zwijgverzuim (2025)

Filip De Groeve is a Belgian pharmacist, author and speaker. With Anneke Valk he wrote Zwijgverzuim, a Dutch-language book about perimenopause and menopause in the workplace, which was named Management Book of the Year in the Netherlands in 2026.

== Career ==
De Groeve trained as a pharmacist. He worked in marketing and management at pharmaceutical companies. In 2021 he was marketing director at Coloplast, a company that makes medical devices for, among other things, stomas and incontinence. That year he was the spokesperson for Praat Poep Met Me ("Talk Poo With Me"), a campaign that encouraged people with bowel complaints to see their general practitioner sooner. Alongside that job he gave talks and workshops on taboos in the workplace. He later left his job to write a book.

De Groeve is associated with JUMP, a Belgian organisation that works for equality between women and men at work. In November 2025 JUMP published a survey on sexism at work and during studies, based on responses from about 4,000 women and 1,000 men; 98 percent of the women said they had experienced sexism. Speaking to Belga News Agency, De Groeve said that French rules requiring employers to set up a procedure for reporting sexism had changed workplace culture in France. JUMP called for similar legislation in Belgium.

== Zwijgverzuim ==
De Groeve wrote Zwijgverzuim. Menopauze op de werkvloer: kennis en beleid voor duurzaam leiderschap with Anneke Valk, a biology lecturer at Wageningen University & Research. The authors use the term zwijgverzuim (roughly "silent absenteeism") for absence from work that arises because employees do not dare to talk about health complaints or personal problems. The book deals with perimenopause and menopause. Because publishers declined it, De Groeve and Valk published the book themselves.

On 16 April 2026 Zwijgverzuim was named Management Book of the Year 2026 at the annual Managementboek gala in De Rode Hoed in Amsterdam. The jury, chaired by Eric van Arendonk, chose the book unanimously. Regional broadcasters RTV Utrecht and Omroep Gelderland reported on the award. In July 2026 menopause expert Suzanne Rethans included the book in a list of ten books and podcasts about menopause in NRC.

In interviews De Groeve has said that organisations should treat menopause as a matter of personnel policy rather than as a problem of the individual woman, and that managers should know more about menopausal symptoms so that employees can discuss them at work. He has compared the silence around menopause with the silence around burnout: employees keep such complaints to themselves because they fear it will harm their career.

== Personal life ==
De Groeve lives in Utrecht.

== Works ==
- De Groeve, Filip; Valk, Anneke (2025). Zwijgverzuim. Menopauze op de werkvloer: kennis en beleid voor duurzaam leiderschap (in Dutch). taBOOH. ISBN 9789090407265.
