= Nick Hits =

Nick Hits may refer to:

- Nick Hits (TV programming block), a previous television block of Nickelodeon in Latin America
- NickMusic EMEA, formerly known as Nick Hits, international pay-TV music video channel
