= Miljuschka Witzenhausen =

Dutch model and actress

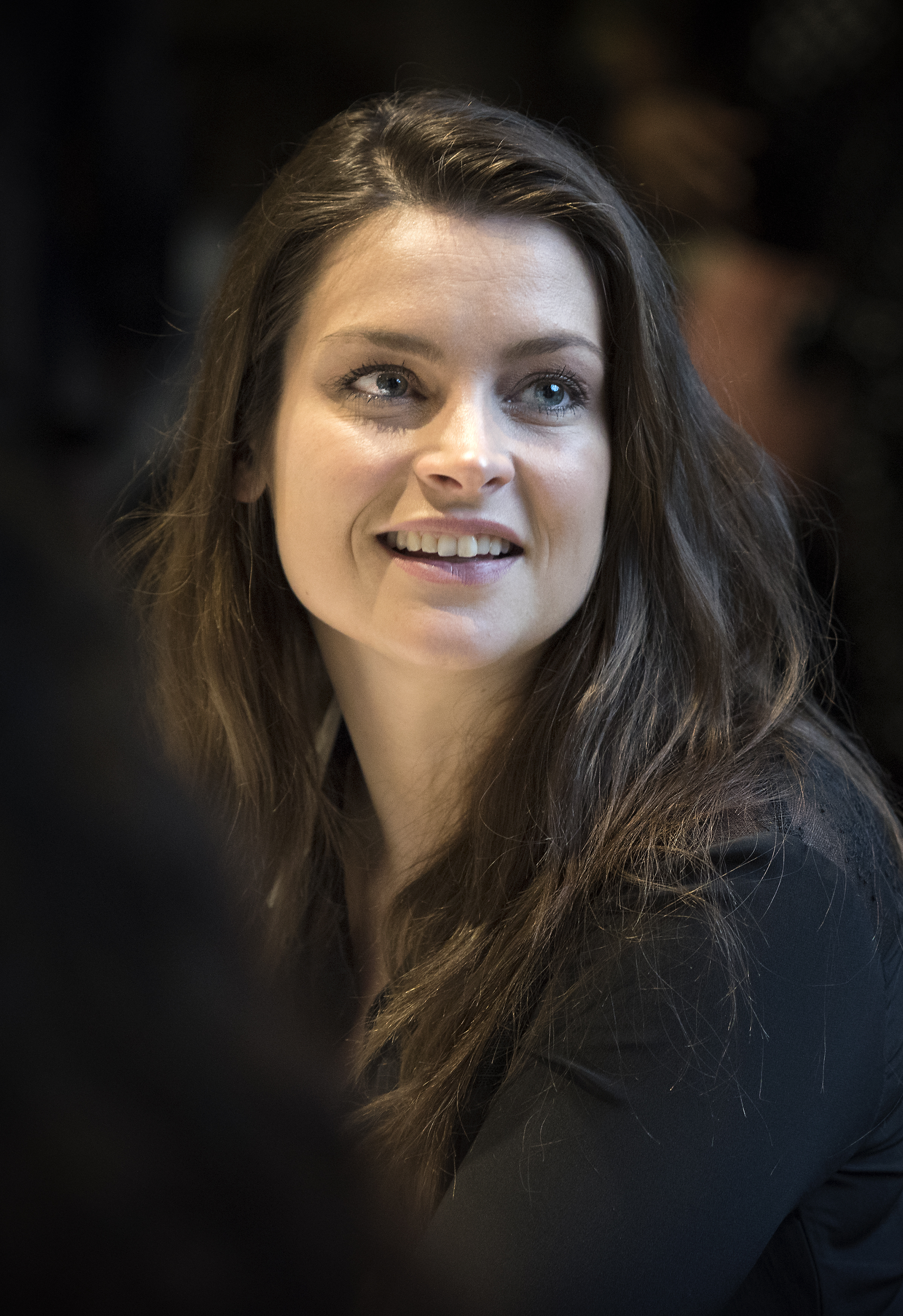
- Witzenhausen in 2018
- Born: Miljuschka Lola Witzenhausen; 10 July 1985 (age 40); Amsterdam, Netherlands
- Occupations: Model, actress, presenter
- Years active: 2005–present

Miljuschka Lola Witzenhausen (born 10 July 1985) is a Dutch model, actress and television presenter.

== Career ==
From 2005 to 2007, Witzenhausen was a video jockey on the music channel TMF. Since 2008, she has appeared in the BNN soap opera Onderweg naar Morgen. Since 2006, she has also been an ambassador for the Dance4Life AIDS awareness initiative.

In the 2010s, Witzenhausen became active as a TV cook, presenting cooking shows on 24Kitchen and making regular appearances in lifestyle programmes, such as RTL Boulevard. In 2020, she was a participant in the twentieth season of the popular television show Wie is de Mol?. She has been an ambassador for WW International since 2020.

Witzenhausen was a contestant in the 2020 season of the television show Het Perfecte Plaatje. In 2022, she appeared in the television show The Masked Singer.

In 2026, she became one of the presenters of the ninth season of the show Kopen Zonder Kijken after Martijn Krabbé was no longer able to present the show due to his health. Krabbé did the voice-over and the show was presented by multiple presenters. In the show, people purchase a home without having seen it first and the team of Kopen Zonder Kijken makes all relevant decisions based on budget and preferences.

== Personal life ==
Witzenhausen's maternal uncle is the notorious Dutch criminal Willem Holleeder. She divorced artist Tycho Veldhoen in 2015.
