= SchlagerTV =

- Country: Netherlands
- Broadcast area: Netherlands; Canada; United States
- Headquarters: Naarden, Netherlands

Programming
- Picture format: 1080i HDTV (downscaled to 16:9 576i for the SDTV feed)

Ownership
- Owner: MuziekKiosk
- Sister channels: Nashville TV; TV Oranje

History
- Launched: January 2009; 17 years ago

Links
- Website: www.schlagertv.nl

Availability

Streaming media
- Paystream.tv: Register for Live Watch
- Canal Digitaal Live: Watch Live

SchlagerTV is a music television channel focusing on Schlager music for European and North American audiences. It launched in January 2009. The channel's programming primarily consists of music videos and German-language music programs. The channel primarily focuses on Schlager music, a popular genre from Germany and Austria, the channel is officially owned by their company and officially owned by their company TV Digitaal BV. In December 2011, the Brava TV Group announced that Strengholt BV became a co-owner of SchlagerTV. However, the sister channel TV Oranje remains solely owned by TV Digitaal BV. Since 12 May 2016, SchlagerTV has been part of MuziekKiosk.

== See also ==
- Television in the Netherlands
- Digital television in the Netherlands
