= 2005 in the Netherlands =

- Decades: 1980s; 1990s; 2000s; 2010s; 2020s
- See also: Other events of 2005; History of the Netherlands

This article lists some of the events that took place in the Netherlands in 2005.

== Incumbents ==
- Monarch: Beatrix
- Prime Minister: Jan Peter Balkenende

== Events ==
=== January ===
- 1 January - New Year's celebrations all over the Netherlands fall silent for two minutes as mark of respect for Dutch memorial service for those affected by the 2004 Indian Ocean tsunami.

=== April ===
- 8: A referendum is held in Curaçao on independence vs. integration with The Netherlands.

=== May ===
- 31: A storage tank explodes in Warffum, Groningen killing 2 men and severely injuring another.

=== June ===
- 1: The Dutch electorate reject in a referendum the Constitutional Treaty for Europe.
- 28: The stockholders of Koninklijke Olie and Shell agree to a complete merger. The new enterprise is called Royal Dutch Shell, is designed after English law and has her headquarters in The Hague.

=== August ===
- 13: Talpa begins with the broadcasting of TV programs

=== September ===
- 11: Dennis van der Geest becomes world champion judo in Cairo judo in the open division.
- 13: The Public Ministry confesses in having made great mistakes in their Schiedamse park murder investigation.

=== October ===
- 27: Eleven soon to be deported asylum seekers die in a fire at the Schiphol-East detention center.

=== November ===
- 2: John Mieremet is assassinated in Thailand and Kees Houtman a real estate agent related to the criminal underworld is also assassinated in Amsterdam
- 14: Domino Day 2005 sparrow - A house sparrow, Passer domesticus, was shot and killed during preparations for Domino Day 2005.
- 15: Political activist, publicist and journalist Louis Sévèke is shot and killed in the center of Nijmegen.
- 25: Severe weather creates the longest evening peak traffic jam in The Netherlands ever: there is 802 kilometer traffic jam at 18.00 o'clock. Only at 05.20 o'clock, the next morning, all traffic jams are resolved. Hundreds of travelers (also by train) spend the night in shelters.

=== December ===
- 5: Start of the trail against the members of the Hofstad Network.

== Sport ==
- 2004–05 Eredivisie
- 2004–05 Eerste Divisie
- 2004–05 KNVB Cup
- 2005 Johan Cruijff Schaal
- Haile Gebrselassie wins the Amsterdam Marathon
- Argentina U-20 wins the 2005 FIFA World Youth Championship, defeating Nigeria U-20 in the final in Utrecht

== Births ==
- 12 January – Roxy Dekker, Dutch singer and social media personality
- 1 February – Lindsay van Zundert, Dutch former figure skater
- 3 April – Antoni Milambo, Dutch footballer
- 14 April – Dean Huijsen, Dutch footballer
- 17 April – Niels Laros, Dutch athlete
- 26 June – Princess Alexia of the Netherlands

== See also ==
- 2005 in Dutch television
