= RTV-7 =

Dutch television network

- Country: Netherlands

Programming
- Languages: Papiamento, Dutch, English, Spanish
- Picture format: 1080i 16:9 HDTV (PAL)

Ownership
- Owner: Seven media beheer BV

History
- Launched: April 2008; 18 years ago

Availability

Streaming media
- Ziggo, KPN and Odido: (Europe only)

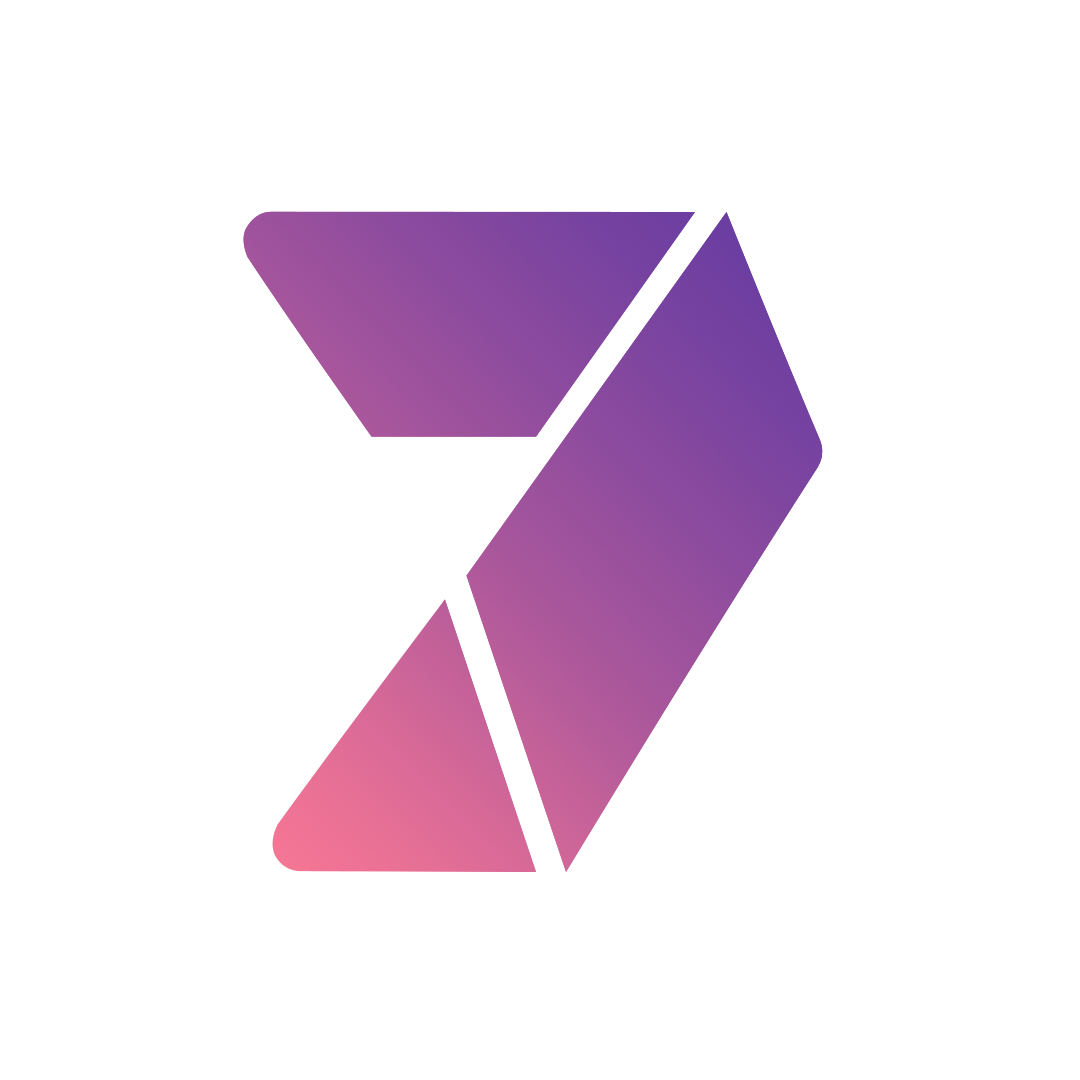
RTV7 Logo 2021

RTV-7 is a Dutch television (founded by Gerard Wijngaarden) network featuring linear programming from the Dutch Caribbean managed by owner Seven media beheer BV. Its target audience consists mainly of people from the former Netherlands Antilles and Suriname living in the Netherlands. Most of the programmes on RTV-7 are in Papiamento, Spanish and English as they are produced by the different television channels from Latin America and the Caribbean. The channel also broadcasts the Surinamese news programme, which is in Dutch, and several RTV-7 original shows.

== History ==
The channel's origins lie on A-Tivi and TeveSur, two separate subscription channels – the former targeting the Antillean diaspora and the latter, the Surinamese diaspora. In January 2008, the channels announced that they would cease transmission after several cable companies refused to renew their contracts. Both channels closed on 1 February 2008. Following their closure the new RTV-7 channel started on cable, as a subscription channel, like its predecessor. For its launch in July 2008, UPC offered a ten-day free preview to entice subscribers for its coverage of the Summer Carnival. RTV-7 also worked to provide better image quality, which was one of A-Tivi's problems (the channel's image quality was poor). At the time of launch, UPC was the only large cable company to carry the channel.
