= Omroep Gelderland =

Dutch public broadcaster

- Type: Public broadcaster
- Country: Netherlands
- Founded: 1 May 1985; 41 years ago
- Headquarters: Arnhem, Netherlands
- Broadcast area: Gelderland
- Launch date: 1 May 1985; 41 years ago (radio); 1 November 1996; 29 years ago (TV)
- Webcast: Watch Live; Listen Live; ZiggoGO.tv
- Official website: www.gld.nl

Omroep Gelderland (lit. 'Gelderland Broadcasting'; abbreviated Omroep GLD) is the regional public broadcaster for the Dutch province of Gelderland. Omroep Gelderland has its own radio station, Radio Gelderland, and television channel, TV Gelderland, broadcasting primarily for the province itself.

== Gallery ==
Logo used until 2007

Logo used from 2007 to 2013

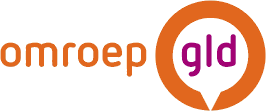
Logo used from 2013 to 2 March 2026

== See also ==
- Television in the Netherlands
