= List of programmes broadcast by Comedy Central (UK & Ireland) =

This is a list of television programmes formerly or currently broadcast by Comedy Central and Comedy Central Extra in the United Kingdom and Ireland.

== Current programmes ==
- 8 Out of 10 Cats (broadcast rights with E4/E4 Extra)
- Blockbusters (now on Comedy Central Extra)
- Criminally Funny (now on Comedy Central Extra)
- Cruise TV with LoveitBookit
- The Daily Show (now on Comedy Central Extra)
- Dragony Aunts (now on Comedy Central)
- Drunk History: Black Stories (now on Comedy Central)
- Everybody Loves Raymond
- Friends
- Important Things with Demetri Martin (now on Comedy Central Extra)
- Impractical Jokers (2012–present)
- Jimmy Carr's Am I the A******?
- Michael McIntyre's Big Show (now on Comedy Central Extra; also shown on 5Star)
- Mr. Bean
- New Girl (now moved to Disney+; also on Comedy Central Extra)
- Reno 911! (now on Comedy Central Extra)
- The Ricky Gervais Show
- South Park (2005–present)
- Spin City (now on Comedy Central Extra)
- Stupid Central (now on Comedy Central)
- Takeshi's Castle (now on Comedy Central Extra)
- Teachers (now on Comedy Central Extra)
- Utopia (now on Comedy Central Extra)
- Whose Line Is It Anyway? (US)

== Former programmes ==
=== Former programming: 2015–Present ===
- The A-Team
- All Grown Up
- Bad Education
- Baywatch
- Beavis and Butt-Head (2021-2025)
- Becker
- Bob's Burgers (now moved to Disney+)
- Broad City
- Chris Ramsey's Stand Up Central
- The Cleveland Show (now moved to Disney+)
- Comedy Game Night (previously shown on Channel 5 as Celebrity Game Night)
- The Complaints Department
- The Cops
- Da Ali G Show
- Daria
- Detroiters
- Digman!
- Fresh Off the Boat
- Guessable
- Home Improvement (2023-2025)
- Key & Peele (2013–2025)
- Kung Fu Panda: Legends of Awesomeness
- Last Man Standing
- Legends of Chamberlain Heights
- Life in Pieces
- Lip Sync Battle
- Live at the Apollo
- The Middle
- Mike & Molly
- Most Ridiculous
- My Wife and Kids
- Nathan for You
- Out of Order
- The Ren & Stimpy Show
- Rob Beckett's Undeniable
- Rhod Gilbert's Growing Pains
- Roast Battle
- Rugrats
- Russell Howard's Good News (a similar show called The Russell Howard Hour is now broadcast by Sky Max)
- Scrubs (broadcast rights moved to E4/E4 Extra) (now moved to Disney+)
- Tosh.0
- TripTank
- Two and a Half Men
- Ugly Americans
- Workaholics
- You're the Worst (also shown on 5Star)
- Your Face Or Mine?
- Younger

=== Only on Comedy Central Extra ===
- The Alternative Comedy Experience
- Comedy Central At The Comedy Store
- Drunk History
- Grimm
- The Good Brothers
- Idiotsitter
- Inside Amy Schumer
- Jackass
- The King of Queens
- Lee Evans
- Micky Flanagan: Back in the Game
- Peter Kay At The Comedy Store (also shown on Channel 5)

=== Former programming: 1995–2015 ===
- 30 Rock
- 3rd Rock from the Sun
- The Abbott and Costello Show
- Al Murray - A Glass...
- Al Murray - My Gaff, My Rules
- Ally McBeal
- Andromeda
- Andy Richter Controls the Universe
- Ardal O'Hanlan Live
- Asylum
- Bad Robots
- Baddiel and Skinner Unplanned
- Badly Dubbed Porn
- Bang Bang It's Reeves & Mortimer
- Barry Welsh Is Coming
- Beauty and the Beast
- Beavis and Butt-Head
- Becker
- Big Bad World
- Bill Bailey – Bewilderness
- Bill Plympton's Shorts
- Birds of a Feather
- A Bit of Fry & Laurie
- Black Books
- Bless This House
- Bordertown
- Bram & Alice
- Brickleberry
- Brighton Chat Show
- Brighton Gala
- Brotherhood
- Calvin and the Colonel
- Caroline in the City
- Celebrity Deathmatch
- Cheers (Now on Channel 4)
- Clueless
- Comedy Blue
- Comedy Store
- The Comic Strip Presents...
  - Bad News Tour
  - The Bullshitters: Roll Out the Gunbarrel
  - Four Men in a Car
  - The Strike
  - The Yob
- Coupling
- Courting Alex
- Cybill
- Dan Doyle: Space Person
  (featuring Manga Entertainment series such as Dominion: Tank Police)
- Das Crazy Clip Show
- Dead Ringers
- Desmond's
- The Detectives
- DiResta
- Dirty Sanchez
- Dirty Sexy Funny
- Dom & Kirk's Night O' Plenty
- Dr. Katz, Professional Therapist
- Drawn Together
- Drop the Dead Donkey
- Duckman
- Duty Free
- Dylan Moran Live
- Earth: Final Conflict
- Edinburgh and Beyond
- Epic Meal Empire
- Eurotrash
- Everybody Hates Chris
- A Fistful...
- Flipside TV
- The Frank Skinner Show
- Frasier
- The Fresh Prince of Bel-Air
- George and Mildred
- Give Out Girls
- Goodness Gracious Me
- Grace Under Fire
- Grosse Pointe
- Grouchy Young Men
- Grumpy Old Men
- Grumpy Old Women
- Happy Days
- Happy Tree Friends
- He's a Lady
- Hippies
- The Hitchhiker's Guide to the Galaxy
- How To Be A Complete Sod
- I Work Here
- In Bed with Medinner
- In-Laws
- Ink
- It's Garry Shandling's Show
- Jack Dee Live at the Apollo
- Jo Brand Barely Live
- Jongleurs Unleashed
- Just for Laughs
- Kate & Allie
- Keith Barret Live
- The King of Queens
- Kitchen Confidential
- Kristin
- Lee Evans:
  - Live from the West End
  - Live in Scotland
  - Wired & Wonderful
- Less than Perfect
- Linc's
- The Liver Birds
- The Lordz o' Flys
- Lucas & Walliams - The Early Years
- The Magician
- MAD
- Malcolm in the Middle
- Man About the House
- Married... with Children
- M*A*S*H
- Mash and Peas
- Mash Up (TV series)
- May to December
- The Micallef P(r)ogram(me)
- The Mighty Boosh
- Minder
- A Minute with Stan Hooper
- Modern Toss
- Moesha
- Monty Python's Flying Circus
- Moonlighting
- More Bad News
- Mork & Mindy
- Mr Jolly Lives Next Door
- Murder Most Horrid
- Mutant X
- Naked and Funny
- Ned and Stacey
- Never Mind the Buzzcocks
- The New Statesman
- Night Stand with Dick Dietrick
- The Nightly Show with Larry Wilmore
- Not Going Out
- Not the Nine O'Clock News
- The Office (US)
- The Penguins of Madagascar
- People Like Us
- Phill Jupitus at the Comedy Store
- Phill Jupitus – Quadrophobia
- The Piglet Files
- Pimp My Ride
- Podge & Rodge...
- Police Squad!
- Popeye and Son
- Punk'd
- Rab C. Nesbitt
- Rendez-View
- Respectable
- Rex the Runt
- Rhoda
- Rick and Morty (now on E4)
- Robin's Nest
- Roseanne
- Rules of Engagement
- Samantha Who?
- The Sarah Silverman Program
- Seinfeld
- Sex and the City
- Sexy Cam
- Shane
- Shorties Watchin' Shorties
- Sister Sister
- skitHOUSE
- Sledge Hammer!
- Soap
- Spitting Image
- SpongeBob SquarePants
- Stacked
- Student Bodies
- Suburban Shootout
- Taxi
- Terry and June
- That '70s Show
- Threesome
- Three's Company
- Time Gentlemen Please
- Tommy Tiernan Live
- Tosh.0
- Trailer Park Boys
- Trigger Happy TV
- Two Pints of Lager and a Packet of Crisps
- (Un)natural Acts
- The Upper Hand
- Veronica's Closet
- Vic Reeves Big Night Out
- We Know Where You Live ...
- Whose Line Is It Anyway?
- Whitney
- Wings
- The Wonder Years
- The World Stands Up
- World's Craziest Fools
- The Young Ones
- You've Been Maimed
