= Radio Gelderland =

- Arnhem; Netherlands
- Broadcast area: Gelderland
- Frequencies: FM Broadcasting; 103.5 MHz (Veluwe); 88.9 MHz (Arnhem/Nijmegen); 90.4 MHz (Achterhoek); 99.6 MHz (Betuwe); DAB+ 6B (East and Central Netherlands); 7A (Southeast Netherlands); 8A (West Netherlands); Satellite broadcasting Astra 23.5°E: 12.188 GHz Horizontal; SR: 29900 FEC: 2/3; SID: 21086 Audio PID: 146; Digital terrestrial broadcasting Digitenne: Channel 117; Cable television Ziggo: Channel 828; IPTV; KPN: Channel 884

Programming
- Language: Dutch
- Format: Regional Talk radio

Ownership
- Owner: Omroep Gelderland

History
- First air date: 1 May 1985; 41 years ago

Links
- Webcast: Webstream (Mobile)
- Website: radiogelderland.nl

Radio Gelderland is a regional public radio station for the Dutch province of Gelderland. Its history started in 1965 when Gelderland joined the RONO (Radio Omroep Noord en Oost). The RONO was already broadcasting for the north and east of the Netherlands. In 1977 RONO split into Radio Noord for Groningen and Drenthe, Radio Fryslân for Friesland and Radio Oost for Overijssel and Gelderland. Since 1985 Radio Gelderland is an independent broadcaster.

Radio Gelderland can be received on analogue terrestrial radio on 103.5 MHz FM Veluwe, 88.9 MHz FM Arnhem/Nijmegen, 90.4 MHz FM Achterhoek and 99.6 MHz FM Betuwe, and via DAB+. It's also available on cable (both analogue and digital), free-to-air on the Digital Terrestrial Television platform Digitenne, free-to-air on the Satellite television platform CanalDigitaal, IPTV platforms, Fiber-to-the-home platforms and on the internet.
