= Philip Bloemendal =

Dutch media personality (1918–1999)

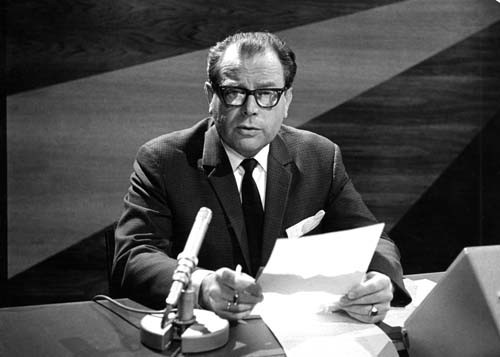
- Bloemendal in 1966
- Born: June 25, 1918; Scheveningen
- Died: February 22, 1999 (aged 80); Amersfoort
- Occupation: Announcer
- Known for: "The voice of the Netherlands"

Philippus Bloemendal (25 June 1918, in Scheveningen – 22 February 1999, in Amersfoort) was a Dutch cinema newsreel editor, announcer and voice-over. He gained nationwide fame as the offscreen announcer of the Dutch national Polygoon newsreel from 1946 to 1986. Bloemendal has been nicknamed "The voice of the Netherlands."

Bloemendal was born in Scheveningen in a Jewish family. After obtaining his HBS-diploma he worked in the textile industry for a short while. He survived the Second World War by going into hiding. Almost all his relatives, including his mother, were murdered in Auschwitz.

After the Second World War, Bloemendal became an announcer with Dutch radio. A year later he entered the service of the Polygoon film company as editor-announcer of the cinema newsreel. In 1952 he became its editor in chief. In 1981 he became Polygoon's managing director. When the cinema newsreel was discontinued in 1986, Bloemendal was bestowed the record of 'longest serving cinema newsreel announcer' by the Guinness Book of Records.

Bloemendal also recorded station announcements for the Amsterdam metro. These recordings have by now gone out of service.

Bloemendal's characteristic voice and enunciation is closely associated with the period of post-war reconstruction in the Netherlands, of which his newsreel gave optimistic accounts. His voice is regularly imitated and parodied, especially in radio and television commercials.

== Legacy ==
The Philip Bloemendal Foundation was founded in 2001 "with the aim of passing on the best practices about effective use of language and communication in the media to new generations of presenters." The foundation grants a biennial prize of €3500 to a talented media presenter.
