= Weer en Verkeer =

- Country: Netherlands
- Broadcast area: Netherlands

Programming
- Picture format: 16:9, PAL 576i (SDTV)

Ownership
- Owner: Chello Benelux (Liberty Global); Meteo Consult

History
- Launched: 15 February 2006; 19 years ago
- Closed: 1 October 2013; 11 years ago
- Former names: Weerkanaal (Weather Channel), till 2008

Links
- Website: WeerenVerkeer.tv

Weer en Verkeer (in English Weather and Traffic Channel) was a television channel in the Netherlands broadcasting weather forecasts, weather-related news and traffic information. The forecasts and traffic reports were provided by a major Dutch meteorological company Meteo Consult in Wageningen which also provides the weather forecasts for RTL 4. Weer en Verkeer has been a joint venture between Meteo Consult and Chello Benelux (Liberty Global).

== History ==
The channel was launched on 15 February 2006 under the name Weerkanaal (Weather Channel).

In December 2008, the channel got its current name.

The channel closed on 1 October 2013.
