= MTV (Netherlands) =

Dutch television channel

- Country: Netherlands
- Broadcast area: Netherlands & Belgium
- Network: MTV

Programming
- Picture format: 1080i HDTV (downscaled to 16:9 576i for the SDTV feed)

Ownership
- Owner: Skydance Europe
- Sister channels: Comedy Central; Nickelodeon; Nick Jr. Nicktoons; Paramount Network

History
- Launched: 1 August 1987; 39 years ago (Pan-European MTV); 12 September 2000; 26 years ago (Dutch version of MTV)
- Replaced: MTV Europe
- Former names: MTV NL

Links
- Website: Official site

Availability

Terrestrial
- Digitenne: Channel 13 (HD)

Streaming media
- Ziggo GO: ZiggoGO.tv (Europe only)

MTV Nederland en België is a Dutch speaking free-to-cable television channel broadcasting in the Netherlands and Belgium. It launched as MTV NL on 12 September 2000. Before the start of country-specific channels, the Pan-European version of MTV aired in the Netherlands.

The channel is broadcast from a Paramount Networks EMEAA office in Amsterdam, but it uses since 1 January 2022 a broadcast licence from Czech Republic in order not to have obligations under Netherlands medialaw.

== History ==
The European MTV began its services on 1 August 1987. The channel was a joint venture between Viacom, British Telecom and Robert Maxwell. It kicked off in Denmark, Germany, Finland, the Netherlands, Sweden, Switzerland and the United Kingdom. In the early 90s Viacom became the sole owner of MTV by buying the shares of British Telecom and Robert Maxwell. At the end of the 90s MTV Europe began to regionalize its MTV feeds. On 12 September 2000 the localized MTV NL started.

On 14 May 2009 MTV launched its first HD channel in the Netherlands. MTVN HD started on the Caiway cable network and on CanalDigitaal satellite TV. In 2010 followed by the larger cable network UPC Netherlands (3 May). The N stood for Nickelodeon. The channel combined the programs of MTV and Nickelodeon.

On 1 July 2011 MTVN HD changed into MTV Live HD, dropping the programs of Nickelodeon because in many European countries a separate HD-simulcast of Nickelodeon began. In September of that same year Ziggo added MTV Live HD to its line-up.

In Spring of 2012 MTV introduced HD-simulcasts of MTV NL and Comedy Central. On April 3 MTV HD started at UPC Netherlands replacing MTV Live HD. In September 2012 KPN followed.

In Spring 2021, both MTV Netherlands and MTV Belgium were merged into the one channel with localised advertising and sponsorship for both territories. However, both countries are served by separate social media sites and share the same website mtv.nl.

Since 1 January 2022 MTV Netherlands operates with a TV licence from Czech Republic. Before the channel used a Dutch licence. Following the licence revision requested on 8 December 2025, Flanders officially became a part of the coverage area.

== Presenters ==
Present

Past

- Romeo Egbeama (2000-2003)
- Fleur Van Der Kieft (2000-2003)
- Georgie
- Seth Kamphuijs (2002-2006)
- Jeroen Nieuwenhuize
- Johnny
- Kris (MTV News Specials & MTV Movie Specials)
- Erik de Zwart
- Tooske Breugem
- Daphne Bunskoek
- Mental Theo

== See also ==
- MTV Music 24
- MTV Brand New
- VH1
- VH1 Classic

== Defunct channels in the Netherlands ==
- Comedy Central Family
- TMF
- TMF NL
- TMF Dance
- TMF Pure
- Kindernet
- The Box Comedy
- The Box
- MTV 80s
- MTV 90s
- MTV 00s
- MTV Hits
- MTV Live
- NickMusic
