= TV Oranje =

- TV Oranje Logo
- Country: Netherlands
- Broadcast area: Netherlands; Belgium
- Headquarters: Steenwijk, Netherlands

Programming
- Picture format: 1080i HDTV (downscaled to 16:9 576i for the SDTV feed)

Ownership
- Owner: MuziekKiosk
- Sister channels: Nashville TV; SchlagerTV

History
- Launched: 5 October 2005; 20 years ago

Links
- Website: www.tvoranje.nl

Availability

Streaming media
- Paystream TV: TV Oranje Livestream
- Ziggo GO (Netherlands): ZiggoGO.tv (Europe only)

TV Oranje (English: TV Orange) is a Dutch music television channel aimed at the Dutch market which launched on 5 October 2005. The programming consists mainly of music videos and music programs in the Dutch language. The main music genres are Nederpop and Levenslied. The channel was founded by Jur Bron and Gerard Ardesch and officially owned by their company TV Digitaal BV. Since 12 May 2016 it is part of MuziekKiosk.

== See also ==
- Television in the Netherlands
- Digital television in the Netherlands
