= DanceTelevision =

Audiovisual dance content platform

- Country: Netherlands
- Broadcast area: Europe
- Headquarters: Amsterdam, Netherlands

Programming
- Picture format: 1080i HDTV (downscaled to 16:9 576i for the SDTV feed)

Ownership
- Owner: DanceTrippin BV

History
- Launched: 2018; 8 years ago
- Former names: DanceTrippin TV (2000-2018)

Links
- Website: www.dancetelevision.net

Availability

Streaming media
- Ziggo GO (Netherlands): ZiggoGO.tv (Europe only)

DanceTelevision (formerly known as DanceTrippin TV) is an audiovisual dance content platform which is active across web, apps, social medias, and television, owned by DanceTrippin BV which is based in Amsterdam, Netherlands with assets in various locales in Western & Eastern Europe, Australia, and Brazil. The platform is a network of the following genre-focussed content brands under which content is distributed to targeted dance audiences: Algorhythm (tech house), House floor (house music), Minimal (minimal tech), Techno Warehouse (techno), Deep House District (deep house), MainStage (commercial EDM), and Chill AF (downtempo). DanceTelevision publishes a variety of content including dj shows from clubs and festivals, studio sets, artist & label features, and a broad range of dance content produced by independent creators within the dance community itself.

DanceTelevision apps are available on iPhone, Android, Roku, Amazon, smart TV's from Sony and Samsung, Sky Germany and Austria streaming sticks, and telecom set top boxes of KPN and Vodafone Ziggo in the Netherlands, Swisscom and UPC in Switzerland, Virgin Ireland, Unity Media Germany. The linear cable TV channel is available in the Netherlands through Vodafone Ziggo.

DanceTelevision and its genre focussed content brands are active across social medias including Facebook where as of June 2019 the network has over 2.3 million fans and 40 million monthly reach. At the same point in time DanceTelevision has over 400,000 fans of its YouTube channel, there were 215,000 fans for its content network on Instagram, 61,000 followers onSoundcloud, and 30,000 monthly active users of its apps.

History: DanceTrippin TV began in 2000 as a grass roots project to qualitatively capture the spirit and musical essence of dj performances at clubs and festivals. It soon began broadcasting its content during the night hours of TEF local Ibiza TV which led it to gain access to world famous Ibiza clubs and DJs. In 2008 it launched its TV Channel and was eventually picked up by the Dutch cable operator Ziggo. DanceTrippin TV could previously be received by satellite as well; the channel was available free-to-air on the Astra 3 and Astra 4 satellites. But in June 2013 it ceased its satellite transmission. In May 2018 the content platform was renamed by DanceTelevision, and repositioned as a network of highly targeted content brands in order to more effectively reach an increasingly fragmented audience. As of May 2019 DanceTelevision has produced over 700 DJ shows which are available through the platform, in addition to works from external and independent creators.
