= Sil de Strandjutter =

Novel by Cor Bruijn

- Author: Cor Bruijn
- Illustrator: Anton Pieck
- Language: Dutch
- Genre: historical fiction
- Publisher: Callenbach
- Publication date: 1940
- Publication place: Netherlands (Note: Published in Nazi-occupied Netherlands.)

Sil de Strandjutter (translated from Dutch: Sil the Beachcomber) is a 1940 historical novel written by Cor Bruijn and illustrated by Anton Pieck. The novel is set on the island of Terschelling around the turn of the twentieth century and features the poor peasant family of Sil Droeviger. The novel covers themes of adoption, island life, family honour and local traditions on Terschelling.

In 1976, Belgian broadcaster BRT and the Dutch broadcaster Nederlandse Christelijke Radio Vereniging co-produced a seven-part miniseries based on the novel. This led to great popularity for the story in both the Netherlands and Flanders. It was also the breakout role for the Belgian actor Jan Decleir.

== Plot ==
On a farm on the eastern side of Terschelling, poor peasant and beachcomber Sil Droeviger and his wife Jaakje still grieve about the death of their only daughter Lobke, who died in infancy. Sil has two sons—Jelle and Wietse—but dreams of having a daughter. When a Swedish sail gets into trouble in front of the island and sinks, Sil manages to save a young girl while her mother drowns in the waves. The family names her Lobke and adopts her as their own. When Sil tries to register her as his own daughter, he first runs into difficulties, but the local authorities eventually accept the girl's new identity. The church is more critical and the local vicar tells Sil to wait to see if a family in Sweden will want her back. This decision angries Sil and he decides to abandon his faith.

The three children in the family grow out to be different. Lobke is studious and neat. Jelle, the oldest, is a free spirited womaniser who likes to make money in lucrative ways. Wietse, the younger brother, is more closed and dreams of becoming a sailor. As he grows older, Wietse slowly falls in love with Lobke and is determined to marry her eventually. However, at the same time, he frequently clashes with his father about the family's illegal beachcombing activities. A fight between him and his father makes Wietse decide to leave the island to become a sailor.

Although he initially set eyes on Maam—the daughter of a rich farmer—with the absence of Wietse, Jelle slowly falls in love with Lobke too. This to the disapproval of Sil, who tells him to stop this behaviour. Jelle's love for Lobke becomes obsessive, but Lobke also starts to grow fond of him. Meanwhile, Aike falls in love with Lobke too. Sil tries to promote the idea of marrying Aike to Lobke, but Lobke is not in love with him. Then, Lobke realises she loved Wietse most of all and decides to write him a letter again. Jelle tries to make advances on Lobke, but Sil finds out. This leads to a confrontation between Sil and Jelle.

When another ship gets into trouble in front of the island, Jelle attempts to save the crew, but falls in the water and drowns. After the funeral, the vicar and Sil excuse themselves to each other. Maam finds out she is pregnant. Wietse returns home from sailing and declares his love to Lobke. But as gossip spreads around the island that Maam is pregnant of Jelle, Wietse proposes her family to marry her to prevent damage to the family reputation. Maam admits that she got pregnant of Aike and not of Jelle. As a result, Maam and Aike get married, and Wietse and Lobke marry.

== Reception ==
Newspapers gave the novel mostly positive reviews. Tubantia wrote a positive review of the novel in early 1941, stating: "This is the first novel in Dutch literature about Terschelling and Cor Bruyn has exceptionally managed to bring the atmosphere of the island and its inhabitants to life. De Telegraaf wrote: "The different characters have been drawn sharply: raw, hard-working and religious and with one big love: the island. A good novel without literary meaning, but fresh and ready of style with living characters, hardened and tanned by the sea wind that blows over the dunes of Holland."

De Standaard wrote: "In summary, it looks like a simple tale. But in reality, it is an exceptional example of writing that never fails to lose attention."
