= Family7 =

- Country: Netherlands
- Broadcast area: Netherlands
- Headquarters: Apeldoorn, Netherlands

Programming
- Language: Dutch
- Picture format: 1080i HDTV (downscaled to 16:9 576i for the SDTV feed)

Ownership
- Owner: Christoffer Productions & Beheer
- Key people: Dolf van de Vegte (chairman)

History
- Launched: 10 December 2005; 20 years ago

Links
- Website: www.family7.nl

Availability

Streaming media
- Ziggo GO: ZiggoGO.tv (Europe only)

Family7 is a Dutch faith-based television channel. The programming is in line with Evangelicalism. Family7 is funded by donations from viewers, donors and some companies in exchange for advertising spots between programs on the channel.
