= Polygoon =

Cinema newsreel company in the Netherlands

Images of a new polder in the Netherlands

The Dutch Polygoon-Profilti was a cinema newsreel company in the Netherlands from 1919 to 1987. It started with weekly news items in the Dutch movie theaters and lasted until 1987 when it finally surrendered to television news shows.

The company was founded in 1919 and then made in-between movies for the silent movies of that time. Starting from 1921, it made ordered custom movies like 'the winning of brown coal "Carisborg"' (name translated) or 'Steam wheat mill "Holland" in Amsterdam' (name translated). Then in 1924 it started with cinema newsreel Hollands Nieuws, first bi-weekly, from the 1930s weekly.

"Where they are not, nothing is happening" was the motto of the cameramen of Polygoon who traveled up and down the Dutch countryside to capture news and local culture. There was a lot of competition at that time from other companies like Profilti and Haghefilm. Contracts for sport events, cameramen trying to cheat each other or fighting, aggressive sales methods and vague acquisitions were common.

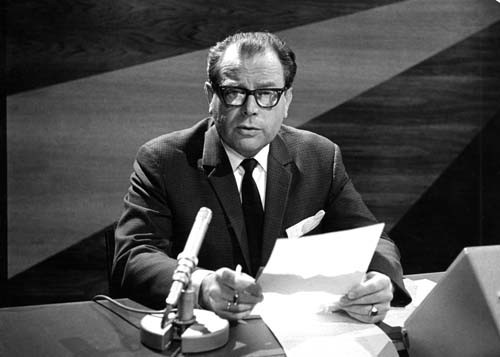
The voice of the Polygoon-journal, Philip Bloemendal

After World War II, the Polygoon-journal had its glory days; 400 different cinemas weekly showed Neêrlands Nieuws and Wereldnieuws. In 1946, the editor Philip Bloemendal (1918–1999) started as commentator; his particular voice became synonymous with Polygoon. Because of the emergence of the television in the Netherlands by the late 1950s, the Polygoon journals lost much attention, but the service lasted until 1987 before it finally ended.

Cameramen employed by Polygoon had orders to fill their reels, no matter what. If not for news, then with the local celebrity or even shots of famous buildings or locations. Because of this, Polygoon's archive is now a valuable source of historical stock footage available for other productions. It is currently being digitalized by the Netherlands Institute for Sound and Vision located in Hilversum. Several Polygoon newsreels can also be found on YouTube. One such example is the arrival of Thomas Cook's Rugby Club the first visiting team to play against Hilversum in 1958, filmed by Polygoon at the AGOVV Apeldoorn stadium in Apeldoorn.
