= A-Tivi =

Defunct Dutch television channel

- Country: Netherlands

Programming
- Languages: Papiamento, Dutch, English, Spanish
- Picture format: 1080i 16:9 HDTV (PAL)

History
- Launched: January 2003; 22 years ago
- Closed: February 1, 2008

A-Tivi was a Dutch subscription television channel targeting immigrants from the Dutch Caribbean. The channel's content was sourced from television channels in Aruba and Curaçao, airing primarily in Papiamento. Programming included news, game shows, talk-shows and Venezuelan telenovelas; the news service from TeleCuraçao was relayed live by satellite.

== History ==
A-Tivi started broadcasting in January 2003 on UPC, in time for the 2003 Tumba Festival. During UPC's free preview at launch, it carried highlights of the previous year's edition. A subscription at launch cost €15. On 22 December 2003, its coverage extended to Multikabel, then in June 2004, to Caiway, which had just started its digital cable service.

In January 2005, A-Tivi signed an agreement with Casema to carry the channel in its digital service from April.

At the end of 2007, the Dutch cable merger between @Home, Multikabel and Casema, which would lead to the creation of Ziggo, made its combined offer public, and among the notable absentees was A-Tivi. Several cable companies in the Netherlands have refused to continue carrying the channel, which led to the announcement of its closure on 1 February 2008. The channel was also known for its poor image quality.
