= Sport 7 =

- Country: Netherlands
- Broadcast area: Netherlands

Programming
- Language: Dutch
- Picture format: 576i 4:3 SDTV

History
- Launched: 18 August 1996; 29 years ago
- Closed: 8 December 1996; 29 years ago (112 days)

Sport 7 was a Dutch commercial television channel of the KNVB for the broadcasting of live football. John de Mol Jr., Philips, KPN, De Telegraaf and Nuon were shareholders. The channel didn't attract many viewers. Some cable companies refused to add Sport 7. Moreover, the audience had little interest in watching football on Sport 7 because the highlights of the Eredivisie were still being broadcast through public broadcaster NOS. The channel closed within four months after launch, on 8 December 1996.
