= TV Gelderland =

Public TV station

- Country: Netherlands
- Broadcast area: Gelderland, Netherlands
- Network: Omroep Gelderland
- Headquarters: Arnhem, Netherlands

Programming
- Language: Dutch
- Picture format: 1080i HDTV (downscaled to 16:9 576i for the SDTV feed)

Ownership
- Owner: Omroep Gelderland

History
- Launched: 1 November 1996; 29 years ago

Links
- Website: omroepgelderland.nl

Availability

Terrestrial
- Digitenne: Channel 22 (HD, Gelderland only)

Streaming media
- OmroepGelderland.nl: Watch live (Mobile)
- Ziggo GO: ZiggoGO.tv (Europe only)

TV Gelderland is a regional public television channel for the Dutch province of Gelderland. Omroep Gelderland launched its channel in 1996. The regional news bulletin called TV Gelderland Nieuws is broadcast daily live at 13.00 and 18:00, repeated every hour.

TV Gelderland can be received free-to-air on the Digital Terrestrial Television platform Digitenne. It's also available on cable, satellite, IPTV, Fiber-to-the-home platforms and on the Internet.

== See also ==
- Netherlands Public Broadcasting
- Television in the Netherlands
