= Paramount Network (Netherlands) =

Dutch variant of Paramount Network

- Country: Netherlands
- Broadcast area: Netherlands
- Network: Paramount Network

Programming
- Picture format: 1080i HDTV (downscaled to 16:9 576i for the SDTV feed)

Ownership
- Owner: Paramount Networks EMEAA
- Sister channels: MTV; Comedy Central; Nickelodeon; Nick Jr. Nicktoons

History
- Launched: 14 February 2011; 15 years ago
- Former names: TeenNick (2011-2015); Spike (2015–2022)

Links
- Website: www.paramountnetwork.nl

Availability

Streaming media
- Ziggo GO: ZiggoGO.tv (Europe only)

Paramount Network is a Dutch free-to-cable television channel in the Netherlands, previously in Belgium and the local variant of Paramount Network in the United States. Launched as Spike on 1 October 2015, it was the second such channel launched outside the US after the UK version. On launch, it aimed at a male audience. Initially, it only broadcast daily between 21:00 and 2:30, time-sharing with Nickelodeon. Since 12 December 2016, the channel is broadcasting 24 hours a day in the Netherlands. Until 6 January 2021, the channel was also available in Flanders. On 24 May 2022, the channel adopted its current name.

== History ==
On 18 August 2015, Viacom announced that Spike would launch in the Netherlands and Flanders on 1 October 2015. It started broadcasting at night and broadcasts from 21:00 to 2:30 on Nickelodeon, replacing TeenNick in its time slot. This brings the American Spike channel for the first time in the Netherlands and Belgium.

On 12 December 2016 Spike launched as a 24-hours channel on Ziggo in the Netherlands, followed by KPN, Telfort, XS4ALL, Caiway and T-Mobile Thuis 3 months later. Nickelodeon became a 24-hours channel again. On some platforms in the Netherlands, and in Flanders Spike kept time-sharing daily between 21:05 and 5:00 with Nickelodeon, which is 2.5 hours longer than before 12 December 2016.

On 18 January 2018, the American channel Spike was rebranded as Paramount Network by Viacom Media Networks to closely associate with the Paramount Pictures movie studio. Later followed by 5Spike in the UK. The Dutch channel has been renamed by Paramount Network on 24 May 2022.

In December 2020 it was announced that Spike would stop broadcasting in Flanders on 6 January 2021. Since that day, Nickelodeon is broadcasting 24 hours a day in Flanders.

== See also ==
- Paramount Network
