= Comedy Central (Netherlands) =

Television channel in the Netherlands

- Country: Netherlands
- Broadcast area: Netherlands
- Network: Comedy Central
- Headquarters: Amsterdam, Netherlands

Programming
- Picture format: 2160p UHDTV (downscaled to 16:9 1080p for the HDTV feed)

Ownership
- Owner: CBS Networks Television Netherlands Inc.
- Sister channels: MTV; Nickelodeon; Nick Jr. Nicktoons; Paramount Network

History
- Launched: 1 December 2006; 19 years ago (as The Box Comedy); 30 April 2007; 19 years ago (as Comedy Central)
- Replaced: The Box (1995–2006)
- Former names: The Box Comedy (2006–2007)

Links
- Website: comedycentral.nl

Availability

Terrestrial
- Digitenne: Channel 11 (HD)

Streaming media
- Ziggo GO: ZiggoGO.tv (Europe only)

Comedy Central is a Dutch pay television channel based on the American channel of the same name. The channel is available on cable, digital terrestrial, IPTV, and satellite operators in the Netherlands. It broadcasts many imports as well as original programming.

== History ==
=== The Box (1995–2006) ===
The Box was originally a Dutch music channel that allowed viewers to dial in or text the number of music videos to be played, much like selecting songs on a jukebox. It launched in June 1995 and was founded by a joint venture between Video Jukebox Network and Quote Media. The Box was taken over by the German music television network VIVA Media in 2002. In June 2004, The Box was acquired by MTV Networks Benelux of Viacom. On 1 December 2006, The Box's airtime was shortened, coinciding with Nickelodeon's move from the channel RTL 8 to The Box channel. At the same time, The Box was replaced by The Box Comedy with only a program block of The Box during the night.

=== The Box Comedy (2006–2007) ===
The Box Comedy was a temporary television channel that was launched in the Netherlands on 1 December 2006. It replaced the music video channel The Box, which used to broadcast music 24 hours a day, and the playlist was composed by televoting. It was intended to ease the transition from The Box to Comedy Central. The Box Comedy broadcast shows like SpongeBob SquarePants, Avatar: The Last Airbender, Wayside and My Life As A Teenage Robot. It time-shared with Nickelodeon. Nickelodeon broadcasts in the daytime and The Box Comedy in the evenings and at night.

During the night, The Box continued to broadcast R&B music. On 30 April 2007, the transition was completed when Comedy Central took control of its airtime.

=== Comedy Central ===
Comedy Central launched on 30 April 2007, replacing former channel The Box Comedy. Between 2007 and 2011 Comedy Central aired between 8:00 pm and 5:00 am. The programming began after the programming of Nickelodeon.

In October 2008 Comedy Central launched a 24-hour digital sister channel, Comedy Central Family, a close collaboration between MTV Networks and Endemol. The channel was first offered by cable operator Ziggo. After this, other providers followed gradually.

On 4 November 2010 it was announced that Comedy Central would receive more airtime. Comedy Central ceased timesharing with Nickelodeon on 1 January 2011, when Comedy Central moved to the TMF channel. On that channel Comedy Central is broadcasting 15 hours a day, between 15:00 and 06:00 (CET). It replaced TMF in its entirety in 2011. During mornings and early afternoons Kindernet was broadcast between 06:00 and 15:00 (CET).

From 1 October 2012 to the present, Comedy Central is broadcasting 21 hours a day, between 09:00 and 06:00 (CET). In the early morning hours, Kindernet was broadcast on the same channel between 06:00 and 09:00 (CET).

As of 3 April 2012, Comedy Central is also available in HD.

Since 1 November 2013, Comedy Central has been broadcasting 24 hours a day, replacing Kindernet between 06:00 and 09:00 (CET).

From November 2011 the digital channel Comedy Central Extra is broadcast by cable company Ziggo. These broadcasts include the American satirical program The Daily Show and stand-up shows. On 10 November 2022, it was announced that Comedy Central Extra would close in the Netherlands on 31 December 2022.

On 1 October 2011, Comedy Central underwent a rebranding for the new logo. In 2012 the channel started with HD broadcasts, beginning on April 3, 2012, at UPC and from 2 July 2012 at Ziggo. It is broadcast increasingly in native HD on Comedy Central.

The voice-over since the launch of the channel in 2007 and since the rebrand in 2011 is provided by Joost Griffioen.

The alternate voice-over is also provided by Frank Lammers.

Comedy Central Family closed on 31 May 2018. However, some of its programmes moved to Comedy Central Extra.

On 2 April 2019, Comedy Central underwent a rebranding for the new logo in Comedy Sans 2018-2019 Era.

== Programming ==
=== Current programming ===
- According to Jim
- American Dad!
- Bob's Burgers
- Broad City
- The Daily Show
- Everybody Loves Raymond
- Family Guy
- Friends
- Georgie & Mandy's First Marriage
- Ghosts US
- Key & Peele
- Last Man Standing
- Modern Family
- The Simpsons
- South Park
- Young Sheldon
- Interstate 60: Episodes of the Road

=== Other productions ===
Local productions:

- Comedy Central News
- Doll
- Freeks Oudejaars
- HiHaHondenlul
- Joezjny
- Lesboos
- The Daily Show, Nederlandse Editie
- New Kids

From Belgium:

- Kabouter Wesley

From French:

- Grizzy and the Lemmings

From the United States:

- 2 Broke Girls
- 2 Nuts and a Richard!
- 30 Rock
- 3rd Rock from the Sun
- 8 Simple Rules
- Abbott Elementary
- Aliens
- Anger Management
- Archer
- Are We There Yet?
- Arrested Development
- Awkwafina Is Nora from Queens
- Badly Dubbed Porn
- Becker
- The Best of Saturday Night Live
- Better Off Ted
- Bless the Harts
- Bored to Death
- Californication
- Call Me Fitz
- Central Park
- Chuck
- The Cleveland Show
- Clone High USA
- Close Enough
- The Colbert Report
- Community
- Crank Yankers
- The Critic
- Crash Canyon
- The Dating Guy
- Dead Like Me
- Dharma & Greg
- Dickie Roberts: Forever Child Star
- Digman!
- Dilbert
- Dirty Sexy Funny
- Dog Bites Man
- Duncanville
- Eastbound & Down
- Entourage
- Flight of the Conchords
- Frasier
- The Fresh Prince of Bel-Air
- Futurama
- Fugget About It
- Glenn Martin, DDS
- Go On
- The Goode Family
- The Graham Norton Show
- The Great North
- Grimsburg
- Grounded for Life
- The Guest Book
- Hollywood Heights
- Home Improvement
- HouseBroken
- How I Met Your Mother
- Hung
- Hustle
- Important Things with Demetri Martin
- Instant Mom
- It's Always Sunny in Philadelphia
- The Jamie Foxx Show
- The Jeff Dunham Show
- Jon Benjamin Has a Van
- Just Shoot Me!
- Kenny vs. Spenny
- Kevin of the North
- The King of Queens
- King of the Hill
- Krapopolis
- Last Comic Standing
- The League
- Legends of Chamberlain Heights
- Lesboos
- The Life & Times of Tim
- Malcolm in the Middle
- Married... with Children
- Melissa & Joey
- Men at Work
- The Middle
- Mike & Molly
- Moral Orel
- Mr. Sunshine
- Mulligan
- My Name Is Earl
- The Neighborhood
- New Kids
- Off Centre
- The Office (US)
- Out There
- Parks and Recreation
- Party Down
- Peep Show
- Portlandia
- Prime Time Glick
- Psych
- Reaper
- Reno 911!
- Rick and Morty
- The Roast of...
- Robot Chicken
- Rules of Engagement
- Saturday Night Live
- Scrubs
- See Dad Run
- Seinfeld
- The Showbizz Show
- Solar Opposites
- Spin City
- Stand Up Saturday
- Studio 60 on the Sunset Strip
- Teachers
- Ten Year Old Tom
- That '70s Show
- That's My Bush
- 'Til Death
- Tosh.0
- The Tracy Morgan Show
- Two Guys, a Girl and a Pizza Place
- Ugly Americans
- The Wayans Bros.
- Weeds
- Wilfred
- Will & Grace
- Workaholics
- The World Stands Up
- Yes, Dear
- Young & Hungry

From the United Kingdom:

- Britain's Finest
- Free Agents
- The Graham Norton Show
- The IT Crowd
- Takeshi's Castle (British edited version and Dutch commentary)
- Taking the Flak
- Two Pints of Lager and a Packet of Crisps

== See also ==
Comedy Central
