= Comedy Central Family (Netherlands) =

Dutch variant of Comedy Central

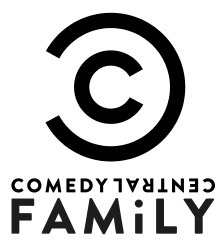
- Second and final logo used from 2011 to 2018
- Country: Netherlands
- Broadcast area: Netherlands
- Network: Comedy Central

Programming
- Picture format: 576i 16:9 (SDTV)

Ownership
- Owner: Paramount International Networks; Endemol Nederland

History
- Launched: 1 October 2008; 18 years ago
- Closed: 31 May 2018; 8 years ago

Availability

Streaming media
- Ziggo GO (Netherlands): ZiggoGO.tv

Comedy Central Family was a Dutch television channel operated by Endemol through a joint venture with Paramount International Networks that was broadcast from 1 October 2008 to 31 May 2018. It broadcast both series from Endemol itself and local and foreign comedy programming.

Originally scheduled for 1 September 2008, it was delayed, but was eventually launched through cable operator Ziggo on 1 October 2008. During its operation, it broadcast comedy programming locally made in the Netherlands and foreign programming from the United States, the United Kingdom and Fleanders. Comedy Central Family was available via cable company Ziggo, KPN, Delta and Caiway. The Dutch and Flemish series were drawn in from Endemol's catalog.

Comedy Central Family closed in the Netherlands on 31 May 2018. However, some of its programmes did move to Comedy Central Extra.

== Programming ==
=== Final Programming ===
- Futurama
- Rob the Robot
- Life in Pieces
- Razzberry Jazzberry Jam
- Fly Tales
- Real Husbands of Hollywood
- I dare you

=== Former Programming ===
- 3rd Rock from the Sun
- 8 Simple Rules
- The A-Team
- Bad Judge
- Community
- Cougar Town
- Dharma & Greg
- Ellen
- Empty Nest
- Frasier
- The Golden Girls
- The Graham Norton Show
- Home Improvement
- Kees & Co
- Less than Perfect
- Married... with Children
- Melissa & Joey
- My Wife and Kids
- The Neighbors
- Nikki
- Samen
- Sam Sam
- Scrubs
- Seinfeld
- Unhappily Ever After
- Up All Night
- Yes, Dear

== See also ==
- Comedy Central
- Comedy Central Extra
