= Nickelodeon (Dutch TV channel) =

Dutch children's television channel

- Logo used since August 1, 2023 (Note: The logo's wordmark has been in use since March 31, 2010. Additionally, there is a variant meant to be used for white backgrounds; the main variant has a white wordmark in conjunction with a fully orange splat.)
- Country: Netherlands
- Broadcast area: Netherlands; Belgium (satellite only)

Programming
- Languages: Dutch; English (subtitled in Dutch)
- Picture format: 1080i HDTV (downscaled to 16:9 576i for the SDTV feed)

Ownership
- Owner: Paramount Networks EMEAA (Skydance Corporation)
- Parent: Nickelodeon Group
- Sister channels: Nick Jr. Nicktoons; MTV; Comedy Central; Paramount Network

History
- Launched: February 23, 2002; 24 years ago (as channel on Kindernet)

Links
- Website: www.nickelodeon.nl (closed)

Availability

Terrestrial
- Digitenne: Channel 12 (HD)

Streaming media
- Ziggo GO: ZiggoGO.tv (Europe only)
- Canal Digitaal: Watch live (Netherlands only)
- TV Vlaanderen (Flanders): Watch live (Belgium only)

Nickelodeon is a Dutch free-to-cable children's television channel and is the variant of the American channel of the same name in the Netherlands and through satellite in Belgium.

== History ==
Before its launch, Dutch public television's children's programming aired selected Nickelodeon series, these were divided among the following omroeps:

- VPRO aired Hey Arnold! and The Angry Beavers
- NCRV aired The Wild Thornberries, Rugrats and As Told by Ginger
- AVRO aired Ren and Stimpy

This arrangement ended in the early 2000s, when MTV Networks announced that it would acquire the underperforming Kindernet and align it with Nickelodeon, airing more titles from the US network.

Nickelodeon was launched on February 23, 2002, with the first two programs were the pilot episode of Rugrats titled "Tommy's First Birthday" and the Hey Arnold! episode "Downtown As Fruits / Eugene's Bike". Initially, the channel timeshared with Veronica (which had just left RTL Nederland and began a new channel capacity of its own replacing V8). On 1 September 2003, the agreement with Veronica ended and Nickelodeon started broadcasting all day on Dutch cable networks.

In addition to the general Nickelodeon programmes, original productions such as ZOOP, Het Huis Anubis, and SuperNick have also been broadcast. The Dutch version of the Nickelodeon Kids' Choice Awards were presented in three years (2004, 2005 and 2007), featuring nominees that were relevant to the Dutch. In 2010, the US Kids' Choice Awards aired, which included categories for the Netherlands and Belgium inserted into the broadcast. Nickelodeon has a separate version in Belgium with advertising and programming variations for Belgian viewers. All Belgian cable and ISP providers carry the Belgian version, with the satellite provider TV Vlaanderen offering only the Dutch version, as it uses the feed of the Dutch CanalDigitaal.

Nickelodeon in the Netherlands was shared with Talpa (2005–2006; 2007), The Box Comedy (2006–2007) and Comedy Central (2007–2010; 2011). After that, between February 14, 2011 to October 1, 2015, Nickelodeon was available 24 hours a day with the block TeenNick in the Netherlands via all providers. After which the channel was shared with Spike from October 1, 2015 to December 12, 2016. Beginning on December 12, 2016, Nickelodeon returned to broadcast 24 hours a day on Ziggo and since March 1, 2017, also in via other providers.

In September 2004, it was announced that John de Mol Jr. (the creator of Big Brother franchise and the television company Endemol) had purchased the evening broadcasting time of Nickelodeon, in order to be able to start his own television channel there; De Mol bought the evening broadcasting time (from 6:00 PM to 2:00 AM). This started on October 9, 2004, with the Netherlands-Macedonia football match, but there was little sign of the purchase during the first half of 2005. The individual football matches were broadcast under the Nickelodeon flag (with promos and logos such as "Nickelodeon is Oranges"). Nickelodeon's regular programming was only occasionally interrupted for an evening, for a report and review of a football match. The Netherlands qualifiers were the first collaboration between Talpa and MTV Networks. The television channel was therefore started as Talpa on August 13, 2005. The first day was well viewed, but besides the football broadcasts, the viewing figures of the other programming was low behind the competition. Talpa managed to attract a large number of television personalities: including Frits Barend, Henk van Dorp, Linda de Mol (John de Mol's sister), Jack Spijkerman, Humberto Tan, Jan Mulder, Caroline Tensen, André van Duin, Henny Huisman, and others. On August 12, 2005, before the broadcasts had officially started, de Mol announced that his intent to start a second Talpa television channel in 2006 or 2007. Since the launch of de Mol's channel Talpa on August 16, 2005, Nickelodeon was continued to broadcast from 2.00 AM to 6.00 PM. The channel Talpa was part of Talpa Media Holding (Talpa TV), a company owned by John de Mol. Other notable media names from that company were Radio 10 Gold and Juize.FM. through Talpa Producties, the company made several programs that were developed for its own television channel. The channel was called Talpa until December 15, 2006, the Latin name for the nocturnal animal the mole, which is a reference to the founder's surname. At that time, from August 16, 2005 or September 16, 2005 to December 15, 2006, they only broadcast in the evening and night hours; during the day, Nickelodeon in the Netherlands, was shown on the same channel. From December 15, 2006 to August 18, 2007, Talpa/Tien broadcast 24 hours a day. On September 19, 2006, Talpa announced a deal with SBS Broadcasting about the use of the name Tien: Talpa would be renamed Tien from December 16, 2006. A month later, on October 20, the channel announced that it would broadcast 24 hours a day. Nickelodeon which shared the channel with Talpa, therefore moved to The Box Comedy. The name of the channel was also changed to Tien. The channel had already broadcast several promos and announcements of Talpa/Tien on December 16, 2006, which was officially launched a day later.

On August 16, 2005 and September 16, 2005 to December 16, 2006, Nickelodeon began time-sharing with Talpa, airing between 6.00 PM and 2.00 PM. On December 16, 2006, Nickelodeon in the Netherlands moved to the channel The Box Comedy, which was simultaneously renamed to The Box Comedy and later to Comedy Central. At the same time, Nickelodeon expanded its airtime by three hours due to high viewing figures. Nickelodeon later expanded its broadcast from 05:00 to 20:00 in The Netherlands and Flanders.

Comedy Central moved to TMF on January 1, 2011, and Nickelodeon resumed its 24-hour broadcast on February 14. A TeenNick block was added to the channel's schedule during the overnight hours, airing between 9.00 PM and 6.00 AM. All programming on Nickelodeon's regular schedule were available in Dutch, with the exception of Dutch-Belgian productions.

A high-definition simulcast of Nickelodeon was slated to launch through UPC Netherlands on April 3, 2012, but was delayed due to technical issues. Nickelodeon HD eventually launched on September 13, 2012, the time through KPN Interactive TV.

On October 1, 2015, sister channel Spike was launched and initially aired during Nickelodeon's overnight hours. On December 12, 2016, Spike became its own 24-hour channel on Ziggo, before launching on other providers (such as KPN, Telfort, XS4ALL, Caiway and T-Mobile Thuis) three months later.

Nickelodeon continues to air 24/7 in the Netherlands, broadcasting TeenNick programming at night and also introducing a version of The Splat. In Belgium, Spike and Nickelodeon continued to time-share until January 6, 2021, when Spike closed and Nickelodeon started to air 24/7.

== Closedown history ==
Nickelodeon Netherlands Closedown history
| Date | Shared channel with | Airtime |
|---|---|---|
| February 23, 2002 - August 31, 2002, September 1, 2002 - July 13, 2003 | Net5 (television channel) Veronica (television channel, 2002–2003) Nickelodeon/Kindernet | 6:00 pm - 6:00 am |
| July 13, 2003 – September 15-16, 2005 | 24-hour service (Kindernet closedown from January 7, 2004) | |
| September 15-16, 2005 - November 30, 2006, December 1, 2006 - December 15-16, 2006 | Talpa/Tien (channel created by John De Mol of Talpa TV/Talpa Holding/Talpa Media) | 6:00 pm - 2:00 am, 6:00 pm - 5:00/6:00 am |
| December 15-16, 2006 - April 29-30, 2007 | The Box Comedy | 8:00 pm - 5:00 am |
| April 29-30, 2007 – February 13, 2010; February 13, 2010 - January 1, 2011 - April 3, 2011 | Comedy Central | 8:00 pm - 5:00 am |
| January 1, 2011 - April 3, 2011, - October 1, 2012 - October 31, 2013, November 1, 2013 | Comedy Central moved to the channel used by TMF, and began sharing with that channel. Kindernet returned to television, On April 4, 2011, was became known as Nickelodeon Kindernet. Nickelodeon Kindernet later ended and the closedown time was used by Comedy Central, which broadcasts 24 hours a day. Starting on October 1, 2012, Comedy Central broadcast 21 hours a day, from 9:00 AM to 6:00 AM local time. Kindernet broadcast on the same channel in the early morning hours, from 6:00 am to 9:00 am local time. From November 1, 2013, Comedy Central broadcasts 24 hours a day. | 8:00 pm - 6:00 am |
| February 14, 2011 – September 18-19, 2015 | 24-hour service/TeenNick (2011–2015) | |
| September 18-19, 2015 – September 30, 2015, October 1, 2015 - December 12, 2016 - March 1, 2017 | Spike/TeenNick (2011–2015) | 9:00 pm-5:00 am, 6:00 am |
| December 12, 2016 and March 1, 2017 – present | 24-hour service | |

== Most-watched broadcasts per year ==
Since 2002, Stichting Kijkonderzoek (SKO) has been monitoring the viewer ratings for Nickelodeon programmes in the Netherlands. Between 2003 and 2017, SKO published an annual list of the most-watched broadcasts of the channel. From 2018, it published a list of the most-watched programmes within the Viacom-owned network.

Most-watch Nickelodeon broadcast per year (2003–2018)
| Year | Broadcast | Viewers |
|---|---|---|
| 2003 | Bassie & Adriaan & De reis vol verassingen (repetition) | 279,000 |
| 2004 | Zoop | 468,000 |
| 2005 | Zoop | 320,000 |
| 2006 | SpongeBob SquarePants | 292,000 |
| 2007 | Het Huis Anubis | 421,000 |
| 2008 | Avatar | 507,000 |
| 2009 | Het Huis Anubis | 477,000 |
| 2010 | Avatar | 333,000 |
| 2011 | iCarly | 322,000 |
| 2012 | Avatar: The Legend of Korra | 340,000 |
| 2013 | 2013 Kids' Choice Awards | 265,000 |
| 2014 | Avatar | 356,000 |
| 2015 | SpongeBob SquarePants | 155,000 |
| 2016 | 2016 Kids' Choice Awards | 219,000 |
| 2017 | 2017 Kids' Choice Awards | 179,000 |
| 2018 | The Thundermans | 124,000 |

== Sister channels ==
=== Nicktoons ===
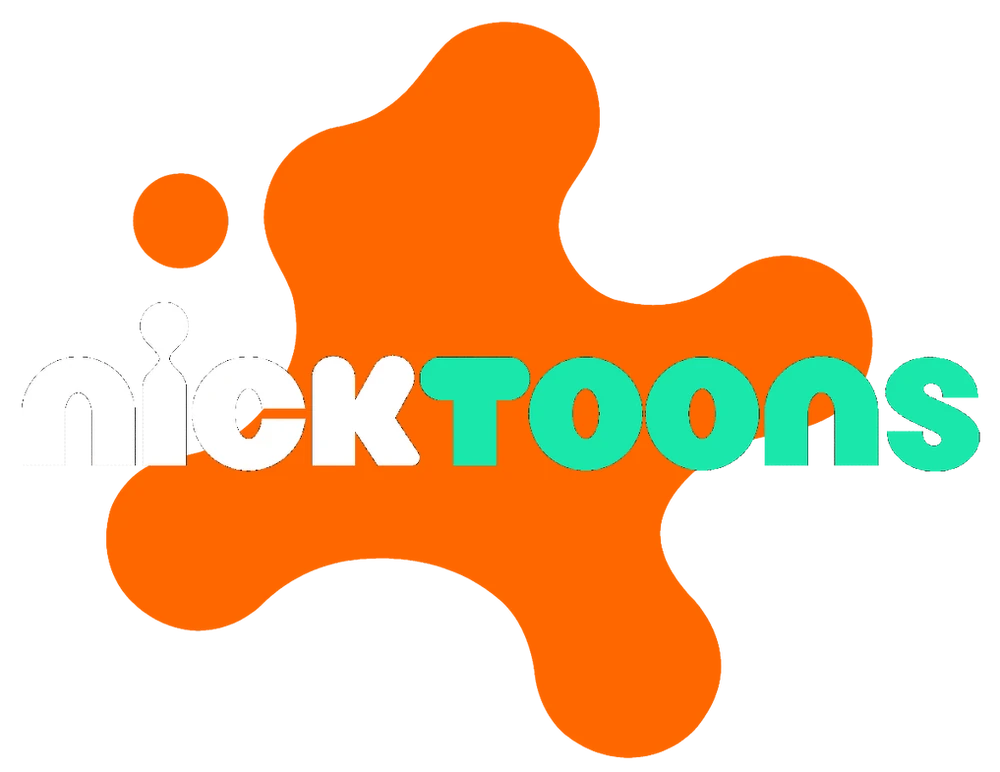
Nicktoons logo

Nicktoons is a Dutch television channel broadcasting in the Netherlands and Belgium, which mostly airs cartoons. It launched together with NickMusic on August 2, 2007. At daytime the cartoons are dubbed in Dutch and at night the cartoons are spoken in English, but subtitled in Dutch.

=== Nick Jr. ===
Nick Jr. logo

Nick Jr. is a preschoolers channel and is the sister channel to Nickelodeon. After the transition of Kindernet to Nickelodeon in 2003, Nick Jr. became a programme block on Nickelodeon in the morning. Nick Jr. was set to launch as a separate 24-hour channel on January 1, 2005, but due to capacity issues it was eventually launched a few months later on May 1.

=== NickMusic ===
NickMusic logo

NickMusic (formerly Nick Hits) is a digital music video channel for children. It launched alongside Nicktoons on August 2, 2007.
