= MTV Music 24 =

Pan-European music television channel

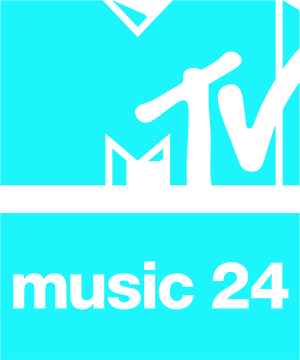
- Broadcast area: Netherlands later followed by other European countries and South Africa
- Network: MTV

Programming
- Language(s): English
- Picture format: 576i (16:9 SDTV)

Ownership
- Owner: ViacomCBS Networks EMEAA
- Sister channels: MTV; Club MTV; MTV 80s MTV 90s MTV Hits; MTV Live; VH1

History
- Launched: 1 September 2011; 13 years ago
- Replaced: TMF (Netherlands); MTV Music (Poland); VH1 Classic (South Africa)
- Closed: 26 May 2021; 4 years ago (Netherlands); 1 June 2021; 4 years ago (all countries)
- Replaced by: MTV 90s (Netherlands); NickMusic (Central Europe); MTV Hits (South Africa)

MTV Music 24 (also called MTV Music) was a Pan-European music television channel operated by ViacomCBS Networks EMEAA. The channel was available in multiple countries across Europe. The programming consists of non-stop music videos 24-hours a day. The channel first launched in the Netherlands and Flanders in 2011. Since then the channel has rolled out across many parts of Europe including Germany and it is available in South Africa. In March 2020, the channel launched in Poland replacing the version of MTV Music Polska.

== History ==
In the course of 2011 it became clear that MTV Benelux would cease TMF Nederland in the Netherlands replacing it by thematic channels of the MTV brand. The broadcast of TMF Nederland ended on September 1, 2011, except its digital channels, the broadcasts of its digital channels ended on December 31, 2011. VJ's from TMF were transferred to MTV Netherlands. A non-stop music channel was introduced under the name of MTV Music 24 on September 1, 2011. As a response of the increased competition from other music channels and online service and the main MTV brand had deviated from its original purpose.

On January 29, 2019, MTV Music 24 started broadcasting in 16:9 widescreen.

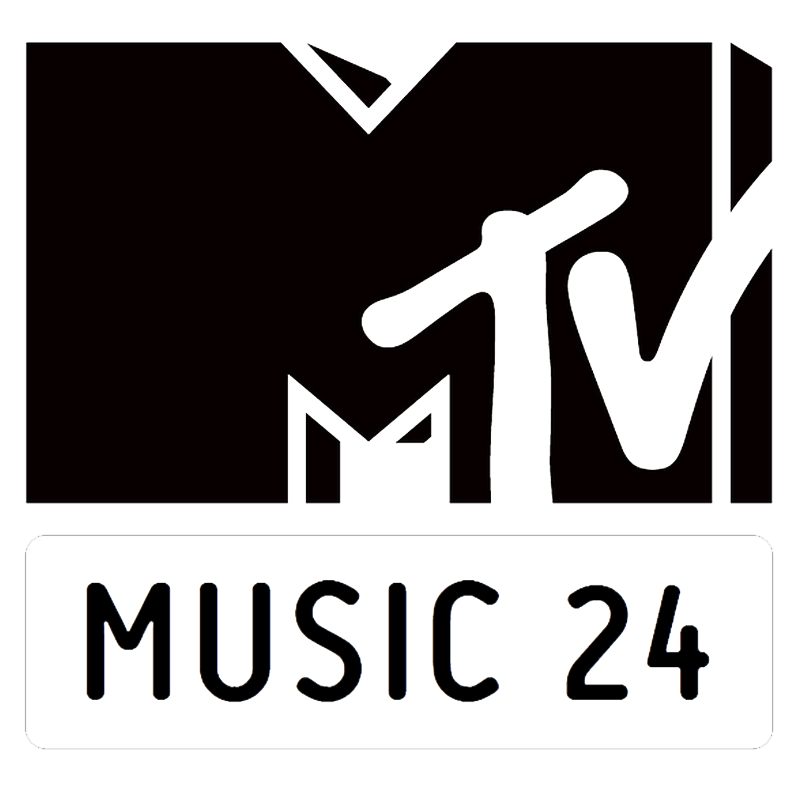
Logo used from 2011 - 2013

In March 2019, MTV Music 24 became available in South Africa replacing VH1 Classic Europe and on March 3, 2020 replaced MTV Music in Poland.

MTV Music 24 got replaced with MTV 90s in the Netherlands on 26 May 2021. On June 1, 2021, The channel was replaced by NickMusic in Central Europe, German-speaking countries and Spain and in South Africa by MTV Hits, closing in all regions. The last music video to be aired on the channel was "Your Love (9PM)" by ATB x Topic x A7S.

== Programming ==
- A-List Playlist: Nonstop music 24/7. The playlist includes the biggest hits of recent years from different genres.
- Euro Top Chart: 20 hottest hits in Europe on MTV Europe and MTV Polska

== Availability ==
The channel was available among many countries across Europe, Sub-Saharan Africa (mainly South Africa).
