= Comedy Central Extra =

European pay television channel

- Logo used since 2019
- Country: United Kingdom
- Broadcast area: Ireland; United Kingdom
- Network: Comedy Central
- Headquarters: London, England

Programming
- Languages: English; Polish; Czech; Hungarian (subtitles); Romanian (subtitles); Bulgarian (subtitles); Serbian (subtitles); Croatian (subtitles); Slovene (subtitles); Albanian (subtitles)
- Picture format: 576i 16:9 SDTV
- Timeshift service: Comedy Central Extra +1 (2007–2020)

Ownership
- Owner: UK & Ireland; Paramount UK Partnership (Skydance UK/Sky Group)
- Sister channels: Comedy Central UK

History
- Launched: List: 1 September 2003; 23 years ago (UK & Ireland); 1 November 2011; 15 years ago (Netherlands); 1 August 2012; 14 years ago (Balkans); 3 March 2020; 6 years ago (Poland) (as Polsat Comedy Central Extra)
- Closed: List: 14 July 2020; 6 years ago (Balkans); 31 December 2022; 3 years ago (Netherlands)
- Former names: Paramount Comedy 2 (2003–2009)

Links
- Website: comedycentral.co.uk comedycentral.ie ( via Internet Archive)

Comedy Central Extra is a European pay television channel that launched in the United Kingdom and Ireland in 2003, then followed by the Netherlands in 2011 where it was available until 31 December 2022. Between 2012 and 2020 it was also available in parts of Eastern Europe and the Balkans.

== History ==
=== United Kingdom and Ireland ===
The channel launched as Paramount Comedy 2 in the UK and Ireland on 1 September 2003 on Sky. It was originally formatted as a semi-timeshift service, airing the same shows as Paramount Comedy at different times of the day. The channel initially broadcast from 2:00 pm to 3:00 am. The channel later launched on Telewest Active Digital later on in the month, and on NTL:home Digital on 14 October.

In March 2007, the channel was reformatted from its original semi-timeshift nature with a new focus on British comedy shows. On 5 November, a one-hour timeshift of the network launched on Sky Digital. By 2008, its broadcast hours were reduced to 7:00 am to 7:00 pm in order for Nicktoonsters and Nicktoons Replay to utilise the daytime slot.

Logo used in the UK and Ireland until 31 July 2012.

On 17 February 2009, it was announced that both Paramount Comedy 1 and Paramount Comedy 2 would be re-branded as Comedy Central and Comedy Central Extra on 6 April 2009 at 9pm. The name change coincided with the launch of a new programming line-up which included new episodes of Two and a Half Men, The Office and South Park.

On 2 October 2012, Comedy Central Extra +1 began to run full-time again following the closure of Nicktoons Replay.

On 20 July 2020, Comedy Central Extra +1 ceased operations as part of a major channel restructure of the ViacomCBS portfolio in the UK.

=== International versions ===
On 1 November 2011, Comedy Central Extra launched a localised version in the Netherlands through cable operator Ziggo. Followed by KPN on 15 January 2012 and UPC Netherlands on 1 April 2012. Comedy Central Extra has been available in parts of Eastern Europe and between 1 August 2012 and 14 July 2020, in the Adriatic region: Bosnia and Herzegovina, Croatia, North Macedonia, Montenegro, Serbia and Slovenia.

On 14 July 2020, Comedy Central Extra closed in the Adriatic region, and is being replaced with a localised version of Nicktoons.

Some of the programming of Comedy Central Family moved to Comedy Central Extra after the closure of Comedy Central Family in the Netherlands on 31 May 2018. On 10 November 2022, it was announced that Comedy Central Extra would close in the Netherlands on 31 December 2022.

== Programming ==
Comedy Central Extra currently airs a variety of American comedy in the daytime. After 10pm, the shows are a mix of American and British comedy.

In January 2007, the channel switched from mainly American programmes to classic British programming with shows such as Seinfeld, Cheers and Roseanne being replaced by Bless This House, George and Mildred and The Upper Hand.

In February 2007, the channel had a 'British Classics' season, with such hits as Spitting Image and Monty Python's Flying Circus.

At weekends, the channel used to screen classic British comedy such as The Upper Hand, Bless This House, George and Mildred, Brush Strokes, Monty Python's Flying Circus, Don't Wait Up and Mr. Bean.

== See also ==
- Comedy Central UK
- List of programmes broadcast by Comedy Central (British TV channel)
