= Nicktoons (Dutch TV channel) =

Dutch children's television channel

- Logo used since May 20, 2024
- Country: Netherlands
- Broadcast area: Netherlands; Flanders
- Network: Nickelodeon

Programming
- Language: Dutch
- Picture format: 16:9 576i (SDTV)
- Timeshift service: Nicktoons +1

Ownership
- Owner: Paramount Networks EMEAA
- Parent: Nickelodeon Group
- Sister channels: Nickelodeon; Nick Jr. MTV; Comedy Central; Paramount Network

History
- Launched: 2 August 2007; 19 years ago
- Former names: Nicktoons on Nick (2005-2007)

Availability

Streaming media
- Ziggo GO: ZiggoGO.tv (Europe only)

Nicktoons is a Dutch pay television channel broadcasting in the Netherlands and Belgium. It launched together with Nick Hits (now NickMusic) on 2 August 2007. It mostly airs animated programs dubbed in the Dutch language. The Global feed has also been available since 2017.
