= Nick Jr. (Netherlands) =

Dutch children's television channel

- Country: Netherlands
- Broadcast area: Netherlands; Flanders
- Network: Nickelodeon

Programming
- Language: Dutch
- Picture format: 16:9 576i (SDTV)

Ownership
- Owner: Paramount Networks EMEAA
- Parent: Nickelodeon Group
- Sister channels: Nickelodeon; Nicktoons; French Nickelodeon; MTV; Comedy Central; Paramount Network

History
- Launched: 1 May 2005; 21 years ago

Links
- Website: nick.com/global

Availability

Streaming media
- Ziggo GO (Netherlands): ZiggoGO.tv (Europe only)

Nick Jr. is a Dutch pay-TV preschooler's network and is part of the Dutch Nickelodeon network. After the transition of Kindernet to Nickelodeon in 2003, Nick Jr. became a programme block on Nickelodeon in the morning. Nick Jr. was to launch as a separate channel on 1 January 2005, but due to some capacity issues, it finally launched a few months later on 1 May.
