= NickMusic EMEA =

Defunct Pan-European pay TV network

NickMusic EMEA [Global]
- Broadcast area: Europe; Middle East; Africa
- Headquarters: London, United Kingdom

Programming
- Language: English
- Picture format: 16:9 576i (SDTV)

Ownership
- Owner: Paramount Networks EMEAA
- Parent: Nickelodeon Group
- Sister channels: Nickelodeon; Nicktoons; Nick Jr. TeenNick

History
- Launched: 2 August 2007; 19 years ago
- Replaced: MTV Music 24 (Europe); VH1 (Denmark)
- Closed: 28 April 2022; 4 years ago (Russia); 14 December 2022; 3 years ago (Belarus and CIS); 1 November 2025; 10 months ago (Australia); 31 December 2025; 8 months ago (EMEA)
- Former names: Nick Hits (2007–2017)

Availability

Streaming media
- Ziggo GO: ZiggoGO.tv (Europe)

NickMusic (formerly Nick Hits until 2017) was a specialised music video channel owned by Paramount Networks EMEAA that was the international version of the US NickMusic. The channel mainly featured modern pop music, but aimed at younger people.

== History ==
On 2 August 2007, Nick Hits was launched in Benelux. At that time, the channel had promos in Dutch.

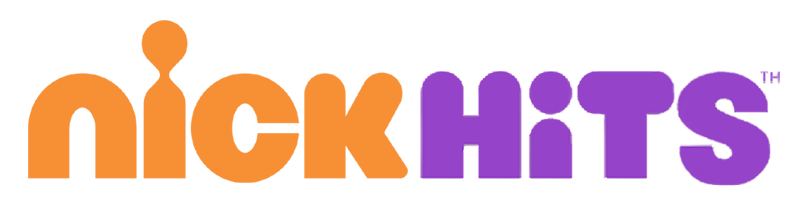
Nick Hits logo from 2010 to 2017

On 1 February 2017, the channel was rebranded; Nick Hits became NickMusic.

On 1 July 2020, NickMusic was delocalised along promo and advertising were removed. At the same time, NickMusic became available in Australia, replacing channel [V]. On 6 July 2020, Nick Music became available in New Zealand.

On 1 June 2021, NickMusic replaced MTV Music 24 in Europe. Later, the channel expanded to Africa and the Middle East. The channel has a Czech license (RRTV) in order to ensure the continuation of legal broadcasting in the European Union (EU) in accordance with the EU Audiovisual Media Services Directive (AVMSD) and the Single Market Law after the United Kingdom left the European Union. Since the Czech Republic has minimum broadcasting rules, it was chosen for licensing purposes in the EU. The editorial office of the channel remains located in London.

On 1 April 2024, VH1 in Denmark was closed down indefinitely and replaced with NickMusic.

NickMusic was closed in Australia on 1 November 2025.

On 2 July 2025, Paramount Skydance announced the closure of several all-music channels on New Year's Eve 2025, including this international iteration of NickMusic. The final music video emitted on NickMusic before its closure at was "End Game" by Taylor Swift, Ed Sheeran and Future. The channel closed at 6:00 CET in EMEA on 31 December 2025 and was replaced by an informational slide displaying the closing message.
