= Late-night talk show =

Genre of comedic talk show, airing late at night

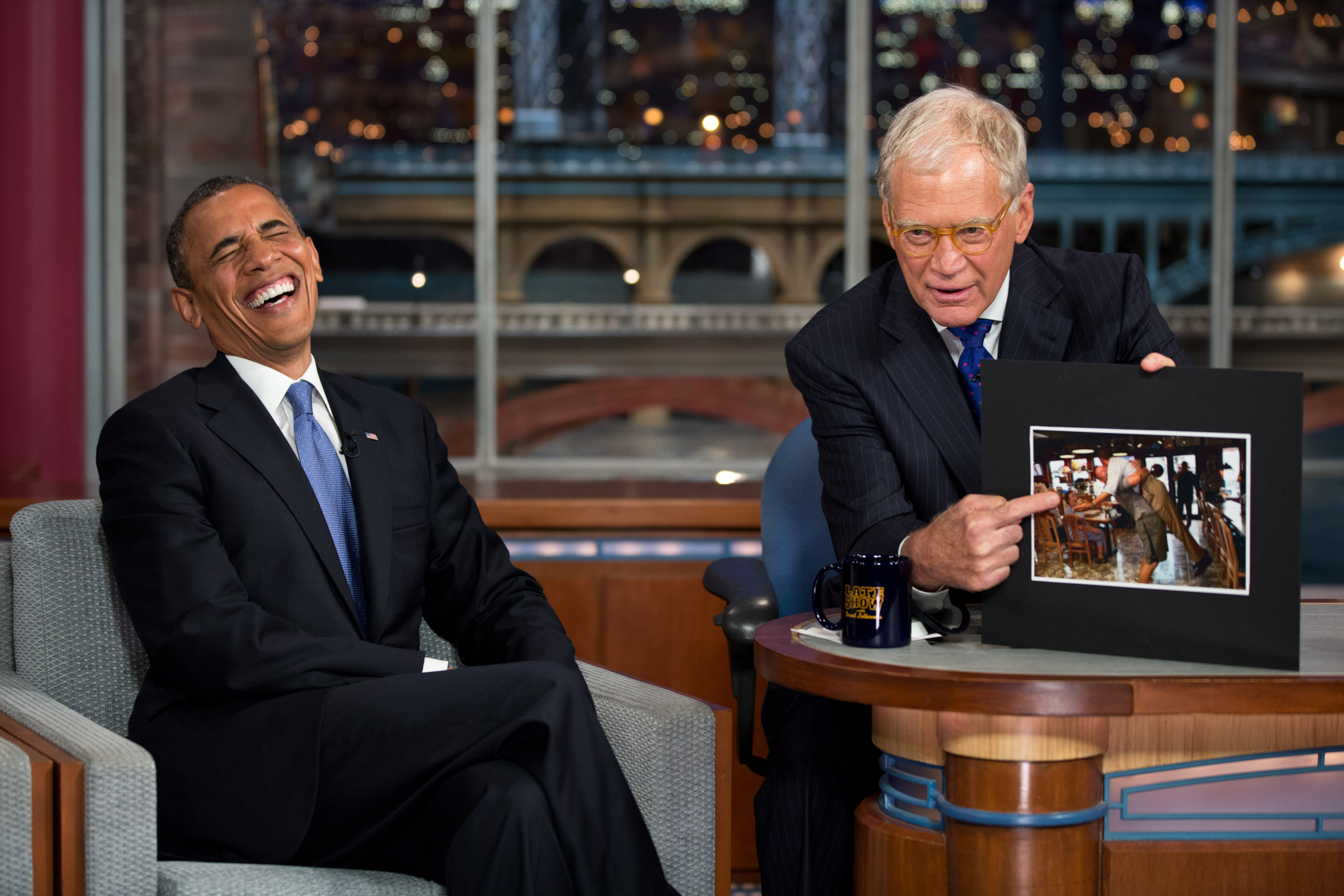
Late-night talk shows often feature guest interviews. Barack Obama (left) is seen here being interviewed by David Letterman (right).

A late-night talk show is a genre of talk show, originating in the United States. It is generally structured around humorous monologues about the day's news, guest interviews, comedy sketches and music performances. It is characterized by spontaneous conversation, and for an effect of immediacy and intimacy as if the host were speaking directly to each member of the watching audience. Late-night talk shows are also fundamentally shaped by the personality of the host.

The late-night talk show format was popularized by Johnny Carson and his sidekick Ed McMahon with The Tonight Show Starring Johnny Carson on NBC. Typically, the show's host conducts interviews from behind a desk, while a guest(s) is seated on a couch. Many late-night talk shows feature a house band which generally performs cover songs for the studio audience during commercial breaks and occasionally will back a guest artist.

Late-night talk shows are a widely viewed format in the United States, but are not as prominent in other parts of the world. Shows that loosely resemble the format air in other countries, but generally air weekly as opposed to the nightly airings of those in the United States. They also generally air in time slots considered to be prime time in the United States.

== History ==
=== United States ===
==== 1940s–1960s ====
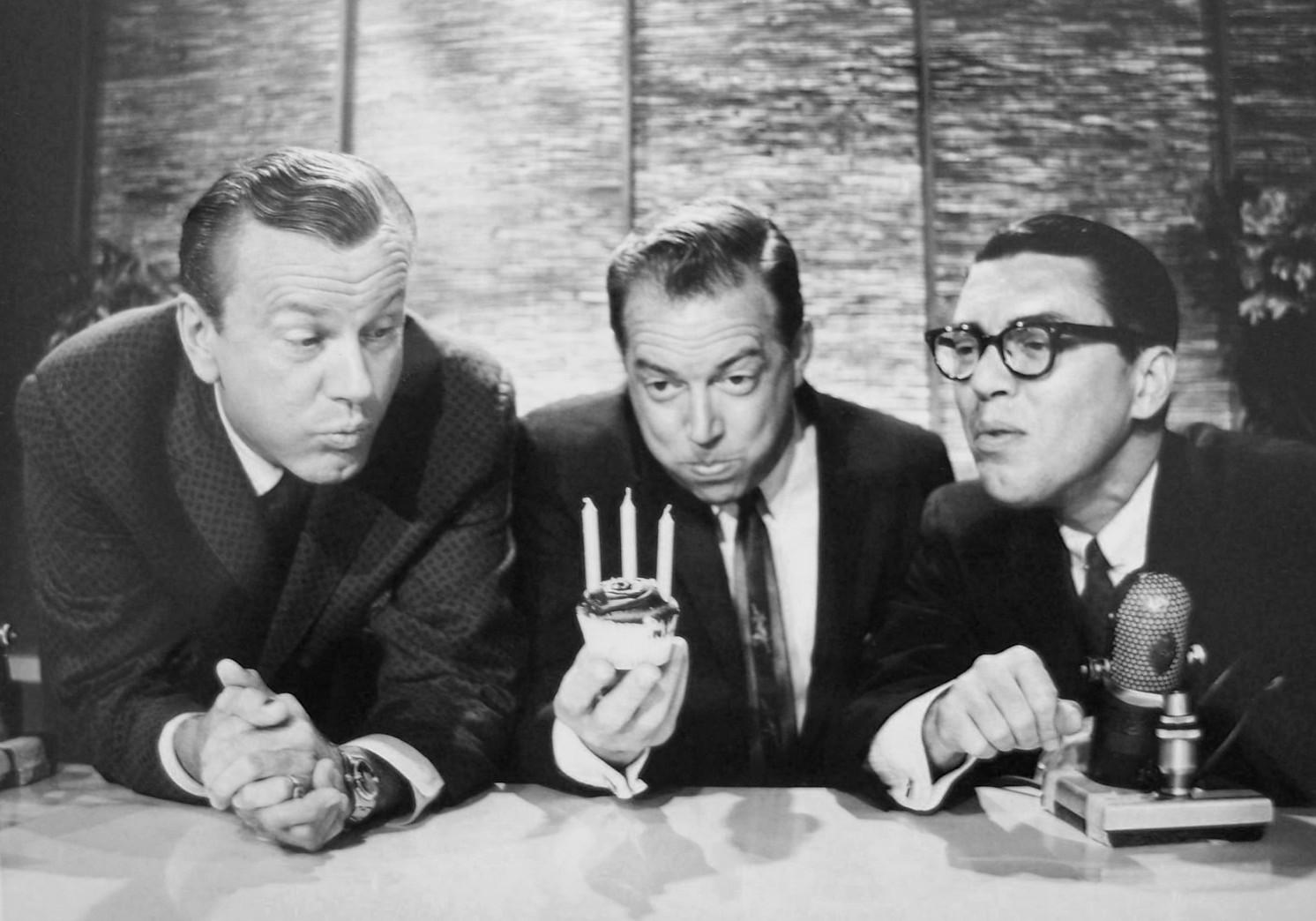
The cast of Tonight Starring Jack Paar in 1960

Late-night talk shows had their genesis in early variety shows, a format that migrated to television from radio, where it had been the dominant form of light entertainment during most of the old-time radio era. The Pepsodent Show, which opened each weekly episode with host Bob Hope's rapid-fire, topical and often political observational comedy, was a particularly important predecessor to the late-night format.

Early television variety shows included The Ed Sullivan Show (originally known as Toast of the Town), which aired on CBS Sunday nights from 1948 to 1971, and Texaco Star Theater with Milton Berle, which aired on NBC from 1948 to 1956. These shows aired once a week in evening time slots that would come to be known as prime time.

The first show to air in a late-night timeslot itself, Broadway Open House, aired on NBC in 1950 and ended a year later after host Jerry Lester left the show, a combination of frustration with being upstaged by his sidekick Virginia "Dagmar" Lewis, burnout from having to go through a large amount of material in a short time, and the lack of enough television sets in the United States to make television broadcasting in late nights viable. (Lester himself was a last-minute replacement host for up-and-coming 26-year-old comic Don Hornsby, whom Hope had recommended to NBC but who caught polio and died less than a week before the show began.) For the next season, the only late-night program on the networks was NBC's Nightcap, a preview of the next day's programming hosted by Mary Kay Stearns.

The first late-night television talk show was The Faye Emerson Show, hosted by actress Faye Emerson. It began airing on CBS on October 24, 1949, in local East Coast markets before the network moved the 15-minute show, which regularly aired up to 11pm, nationwide in March 1950. In 1950, Emerson also hosted a similar show on NBC called Fifteen with Faye for about six months before committing the CBS show. Emerson's show was distinguished from her competition on NBC in that she was more openly political; Emerson, an avowed Democrat, regularly interviewed political and intellectual figures on her show (among them Soviet leader Joseph Stalin) in addition to a smattering of vaudeville and variety acts.

The first version of The Tonight Show, Tonight Starring Steve Allen, debuted in 1954 on NBC. The show created many modern talk show staples including an opening monologue, celebrity interviews, audience participation, comedy bits, and musical performances; it also had some holdovers from the radio era, including a vocal group (Steve and Eydie, who went on to decades of success after Tonight) in addition to the house band, something that later late-night shows would abandon. By this point, the Federal Communications Commission had lifted a freeze on new television stations, which allowed new stations to appear across the country, and television set sales soon grew exponentially. As a result, unlike Broadway Open House, Tonight proved to be a resounding success.

The success of the show led Allen to receive another show, entitled The Steve Allen Show, which would compete with The Ed Sullivan Show on Sunday nights. Meanwhile, hosting duties of The Tonight Show were split between Allen and Ernie Kovacs; Kovacs had defected to NBC from his own late-night show on the then-crumbling DuMont Television Network. Both Allen and Kovacs departed from Tonight in 1957 in order to focus on Allen's Sunday night show. After the two left, the format changed to something similar to Today and was renamed Tonight! America After Dark, hosted first by Jack Lescoulie, and later by Al Collins, with interviews conducted by Hy Gardner, and a house band led by Lou Stein performing. The show was not popular, leading to many NBC affiliates dropping the show. The show returned to the original format that year and was renamed Tonight Starring Jack Paar.

The even greater success of the show during Paar's hosting resulted in many NBC affiliates deciding to clear the show. He was noted for his conversational style, relatively high-brow interview guests, feuds with other media personalities (his animosity toward print journalists Ed Sullivan and Walter Winchell marked a power shift from print to television; Winchell's career never recovered from the damage), and mercurial personality. Paar quit the show in 1960 in a dispute over a censored joke, but was allowed to come back a month later. He permanently left the show in 1962, saying that he could not handle the workload of The Tonight Show (at the time, the show ran 105 minutes a day, five nights a week), and he moved to his own weekly prime-time show, which ran until 1965.

After Paar's departure, hosting duties were filled by Groucho Marx, Mort Sahl, and many others. Johnny Carson took over as host of The Tonight Show in 1962 and the show was renamed The Tonight Show Starring Johnny Carson. Carson streamlined the format of the show, focusing more on entertainment personalities, tweaking the monologue to feature shorter jokes, and emphasizing sketch comedy. Ed McMahon served as Carson's announcer, while from 1962 to 1966, the band was led by Skitch Henderson, who hired, among others, Doc Severinsen. When Henderson left, Milton DeLugg took over. Severinsen assumed the position in 1967 and served as bandleader with the NBC Orchestra. The show originated from NBC Studios in New York City but, as part of Carson's shifting the show toward a more entertainment-oriented program, moved to Burbank, California, in 1972.

NBC's two other rivals during the early television era, CBS and ABC, did not attempt any major forays into late-night television until the 1960s. ABC's first effort at the late-night TV race, The Les Crane Show was hosted by Les Crane, which pioneered the controversial tabloid talk show format that would not become popular until two decades later. With most viewers not accustomed to the visceral conflict it entailed, Crane's show lasted only six months. Shorter still was The Las Vegas Show, a Las Vegas-based late-night show hosted by Bill Dana that was the only offering of the United Network that ever made it to air (because that network only had a handful of affiliates, it also syndicated the program to CBS, ABC and independent stations); it, along with the network, only lasted five weeks in summer 1967.

Steve Allen himself returned to NBC late night in syndication twice in this time frame, first with a show that ran from 1962 to 1964 and then with a series that ran from 1968 to 1971. ABC added The Joey Bishop Show, with Regis Philbin as sidekick, to its late-night lineup in 1967, employing a talk show format, in an attempt to compete against the Tonight Show, which lasted until 1969. CBS went without late-night TV (the closest thing it would have to a late-night show was its late-prime-time variety show The Danny Kaye Show from 1963 to 1967) until 1969, when it acquired The Merv Griffin Show from syndication; Griffin returned to syndication in 1972, and CBS would not air any further late-night talk shows until 1989, instead opting for reruns, lifestyle programs and, later, imported Canadian dramas in the time slot. By the 1960s, NBC had already cornered the market for late-night television viewing and would dominate the ratings for several decades in the future.

==== 1970s–1980s ====
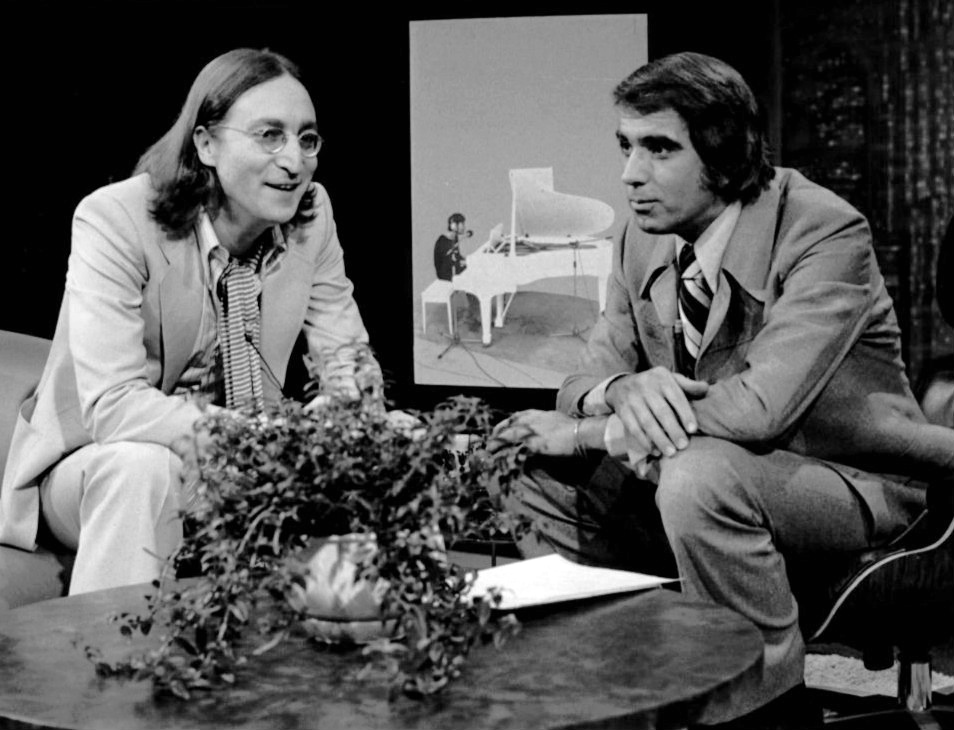
Tomorrow (host Tom Snyder at right, interviewing John Lennon) followed a low-key interview format.

A number of restrictions on television networks that took effect in 1971, among them a nationwide prohibition on tobacco advertising, the requirement that a portion of prime time be set aside for local stations, and rules prohibiting networks from also acting as syndicators, prompted NBC to extend its broadcast day by an additional hour with programming it hoped would recuperate some of its lost revenue. In 1973, NBC launched two new programs: a concert series, The Midnight Special, that aired Friday nights, and a low-cost talk show, The Tomorrow Show, hosted by Tom Snyder, that aired Mondays through Thursdays. Both shows aired immediately following Carson's Tonight Show at 1:00 a.m. ET. Tomorrow was different from The Tonight Show. For instance, the show originally featured no studio audience, while Snyder would conduct one-on-one interviews with a cigarette in hand. Snyder's guest list was eclectic and would sometimes include the intellectuals and cultural and artistic figures that Carson had long since abandoned. Carson's new contract in 1980 allowed him to cut the length of his show from 90 minutes to 60 minutes, and for a short time, Tomorrow was moved to an earlier timeslot, to fill the time gap left by Carson's move. NBC felt that Snyder's more conversational style would not bring in enough viewership in the earlier time slot, forcibly changed the show's format to resemble Carson's, and added gossip reporter Rona Barrett as a co-host. The two did not get along and had an acrimonious relationship on and off the air. The agreement gave Carson's production company ownership of the timeslot following Tonight, which Carson Productions and NBC used to create Late Night with David Letterman on February 1, 1982. When NBC offered Snyder the time slot after Letterman, he refused it, having always been resentful of the forced change in format, and NBC News Overnight, a newscast, took the slot instead, some months after Tomorrow's final broadcast in 1982.

During his tenure as host of The Tonight Show, Carson became known as The King of Late Night. While numerous hosts (Merv Griffin and Dick Cavett being the best-known) attempted to compete with Carson, none was ever successful in drawing more viewers than Carson did on Tonight, not even ABC's short-lived revival of Paar's show in 1973 using the name Jack Paar Tonite (though Paar blamed erratic scheduling and his own unwillingness to succeed at the expense of Cavett, his friend and former writer). Much like Paar, Carson became tired of fulfilling the workload of 525 minutes a week, so The Tonight Show was shortened to 90 minutes and again to 60 minutes in 1980 with 15 weeks of vacation a year. Because of a lack of competition, Carson was free to take time off (by 1980, he was only hosting three new shows a week) and have guest hosts on the show on a weekly basis, and for weeks at a time when Carson was on vacation, including Joey Bishop (a former competitor of his), Joan Rivers, David Letterman, Bob Newhart, Don Rickles, David Brenner and Jerry Lewis.

ABC opted not to compete against Carson with a late-night talk show. In 1980, it produced a pilot of a Richard Dawson-hosted show called Bizarre (it instead went to series on Showtime with John Byner as host) and, for two years, carried the weekly sketch comedy series Fridays. ABC instead counterprogrammed Carson with a successful news magazine entitled Nightline, beginning in 1980.

After 1980, Carson produced new shows only three nights a week with guest hosts and "Best of Carson" reruns the other two nights. From 1983 to 1986, Rivers and Brenner served as Carson's permanent guest hosts. Many in 1986, including top executives at NBC, thought it was possible that Johnny Carson would retire after reaching his 25th anniversary on October 1, 1987, as it was such a logical cut-off point.

In the spring of 1986, a confidential memo between top NBC executives, listing about ten possible replacements in the event of Carson's retirement the next year, was leaked. When Rivers saw it, she was shocked to see that she was nowhere on the list despite the fact that she had been The Tonight Show's permanent guest host since 1983. In 1986, Joan Rivers joined the brand-new Fox network, where she hosted her own late-night talk show, The Late Show, which competed directly against The Tonight Show. Clint Holmes served as Rivers' announcer while Mark Hudson served as band leader. Carson was incensed that Rivers did not consult him beforehand and never spoke to her again.

Brenner also left Tonight in 1986, although he did so amicably, to launch a syndicated 30-minute late-night talk show called Nightlife, which was canceled after one season.

From 1986 to 1987 Garry Shandling, who had been a frequent guest host for Carson in the early 1980s, served as permanent guest host, alternating with Jay Leno. He then left to focus on his cable program, It's Garry Shandling's Show, leaving Leno to be Carson's sole guest host.

In June 1987, Late Night with David Letterman, which had been running very successfully on NBC expanded from four to five nights per week, displacing the four-year-old Friday Night Videos to the timeslot following it. FNV, which had several subsequent format changes, ran until 2002.

Rivers was fired from The Late Show in 1987 after abysmal ratings and a battle with network executives, leading to her being replaced by Arsenio Hall. Hall performed extremely well among viewers in the 18–49 demographic; however, Fox had already greenlit The Wilton North Report to replace The Late Show, leading to Hall hosting his own late-night talk show in syndication after The Late Show was canceled in 1988. The Late Show continued with several unknown hosts until its cancellation. Hall's syndicated show, The Arsenio Hall Show, began in syndication in 1988, becoming more popular among younger viewers than Carson.

Carson did not retire in 1987, instead continuing as host until 1992 with Leno as sole permanent guest host. The last network attempt at a Carson competitor, CBS's The Pat Sajak Show, lasted less than 16 months, debuting in 1989 and being canceled in 1990.

Beginning on August 22, 1988, NBC concluded its main programming for the day with a half-hour entry, Later, hosted by NBC sportscaster Bob Costas and airing at 1:35 a.m. Eastern, after Letterman, Mondays through Thursdays. It originated from 30 Rockefeller Plaza in New York and bore a strong resemblance to an earlier NBC late-night favorite, Tom Snyder's Tomorrow, due to its lack of the typical late-night trappings in favor of a low-key but intense concentration upon Costas interviewing a single guest. Costas hosted the program until 1994.

==== 1992–2009 ====
Carson retired as host of The Tonight Show in 1992 following his 30th anniversary as host. This garnered major media attention and speculation on who would replace him. The two candidates were David Letterman (host of Late Night since 1982) and Jay Leno (Carson's regular guest host since 1987). Leno was eventually chosen, leading to Letterman leaving the NBC network for CBS to launch the direct competitor Late Show with David Letterman in 1993. The Tonight Show with Jay Leno debuted in 1992 and Letterman was replaced by newcomer Conan O'Brien as host of Late Night. Arsenio Hall's show lost numerous affiliates after Letterman's debut and his show was canceled one year later.

Fox returned to late-night television in September 1993 with The Chevy Chase Show. However, due to sagging ratings, disastrous reviews, and Chase's embitterment at not being allowed to present the program according to his preferences, the show was canceled the following month.

MTV entered the late-night contest in 1993 when it debuted The Jon Stewart Show, hosted by Jon Stewart, which ran until 1995.

In 1994 Bob Costas, the host of NBC's Later, gave way to the host of the cable show Talk Soup, Greg Kinnear, whose tenure was accompanied by a move to Burbank and toward a more conventional, audience-and-celebrity-driven format. Kinnear parlayed that experience into a movie career and stayed only two years; he left in 1996 and was succeeded by a plethora of fill-in hosts for the next four years.

Letterman initially won the late-night ratings battle but fell behind Leno in 1995; Leno generally remained in first place until first leaving Tonight in 2009. To combat NBC's Late Night, CBS gave Letterman's studio Worldwide Pants control of the post-Late Show time slot, and premiered The Late Late Show with Tom Snyder in 1995 — serving as a spiritual successor to Snyder's Tomorrow. They had originally attempted to lure Bob Costas away from NBC and Later (offering to have him host The Late Late Show and become a correspondent for CBS's newsmagazine 60 Minutes), but were unsuccessful due to his desire to stay with NBC Sports, as well as continuing his relationship with NBC chief Dick Ebersol.

Snyder departed Tomorrow in 1999 and was succeeded by Craig Kilborn. At this time, The Late Late Show switched to a more conventional (albeit lower-budget) format in line with Late Show and its competitors. Kilborn had previously served as host of The Daily Show, a late-night satirical news program on Comedy Central, and upon Kilborn's departure, Jon Stewart replaced him on that program. Perhaps one of the most unusual late-night hosts to come out of this boom was basketball player and later entrepreneur Magic Johnson, whose syndicated The Magic Hour was a major flop and effectively ended any future efforts from anyone else at a syndicated late-night talk show at that point in time.

ABC finally re-entered the late-night first-run comedy fray, after an absence of 15 years, in 1997 by placing Politically Incorrect with Bill Maher (which had aired on Comedy Central from 1993 to 1996) into its lineup after Nightline. Unlike traditional late-night talk shows, Politically Incorrect was a half hour in length and (following a brief host monologue) featured a panel of four guests debating topical issues while Maher moderated in a comedic fashion.

With the new millennium in 2000, NBC's Later finally got another permanent host after various figures had taken the chair for several years, in the form of a VH1 personality, Cynthia Garrett, who broke the proverbial "glass ceiling" by becoming the first African-American female late-night host. Unfortunately, Garrett only lasted a year before NBC canceled the 12 1/2-year-old Later in favor of reruns of the critically acclaimed cult Canadian-produced sketch comedy series, SCTV, itself a former NBC late-night program that aired Fridays between 1981 and 1983. That action, a temporary measure, was necessitated by the prolonged development of, and negotiations with a host of, a slated replacement show (see below).

Many late-night talk shows went off the air in the days following the September 11 attacks of 2001, while their networks aired round-the-clock news coverage. Letterman was the first to return on September 17, addressing the situation in an opening monologue. The show was not presented in its normal jovial manner, and featured Dan Rather, Regis Philbin, and a musical performance from Tori Amos. Politically Incorrect also resumed on September 17 and immediately drew controversy due to remarks Maher and a guest (Dinesh D'Souza) made concerning the "coward" label given to the terrorists by President George W. Bush. The Tonight Show returned the following night, featuring John McCain and a performance from Crosby, Stills, and Nash.

After NBC's placeholding run of SCTV at 1:35 a.m. came to an end after a year, the network debuted Last Call with Carson Daly in its place in January 2002; Daly was a former MTV VJ. Four months later, it expanded to five nights a week (from Later's four), and unlike the other shows on the air at the time, only a half-year's worth of first-run programs were recorded each season. In 2009, Last Call was retooled with a travelogue-like format, using interviews and performances filmed on-location rather than a traditional studio-based format.

Politically Incorrect was canceled due to low ratings in the summer of 2002, after which Maher joined HBO and began hosting the similarly formatted weekly series Real Time. ABC then tapped Comedy Central personality Jimmy Kimmel to host a more traditional late-night program, Jimmy Kimmel Live!. From its beginning in 2003 until early 2013, the show aired following Nightline on ABC's late-night lineup. With Nightline past its prime in audience size due to the proliferation of cable news, and ABC believing in stronger ratings potential in the timeslot, Jimmy Kimmel Live! was moved to 11:35 p.m. ET/PT on January 8, 2013—placing it in line with its competitors, Letterman and Leno.

On October 17, 2005, Comedy Central premiered The Colbert Report, a spin-off of The Daily Show hosted by regular cast member Stephen Colbert. The show was structured as a satire of opinion-based cable news programs, featuring Colbert portraying a narcissistic pundit reminiscent of Fox News hosts such as Bill O'Reilly and Sean Hannity, among other influences.

Jake Sasseville entered the late-night arena after a self-syndication campaign got him clearance on several ABC affiliates by local general managers in 2008. The Edge with Jake Sasseville aired after Jimmy Kimmel Live! in some markets, reaching a total of 35 million homes, despite the network's concerns. The show went off the air in 2010. Another syndicated show that earned significant clearance in the late 2000s was Comics Unleashed, which was produced by Byron Allen's Entertainment Studios, and had still been cleared by some stations (such as WCBS-TV and other CBS owned-and-operated stations) as late as 2013 without any new episodes having been produced. Comics Unleashed has largely relied on Allen buying the airtime from CBS and its stations to achieve clearance.

Scottish native Craig Ferguson succeeded Kilborn as host of The Late Late Show in 2005, renaming it The Late Late Show with Craig Ferguson. TBS entered the late-night scene in 2009 when it debuted Lopez Tonight, hosted by comedian George Lopez. On September 27, 2004, the 50th anniversary of The Tonight Show's debut, NBC announced that Jay Leno would be succeeded by Conan O'Brien, in 2009. Leno explained that he did not want to cause a repeat of the hard feelings and controversy that occurred when he was picked for the show over David Letterman following Carson's retirement in 1992. O'Brien's final Late Night episode was taped on February 20, 2009. Saturday Night Live alum Jimmy Fallon took over as host of Late Night on March 2, 2009.

The popularity of late-night shows in the United States has been cited as a key factor in Americans not getting a requisite seven to eight hours of sleep per night. Since 2015, late-night talk shows have competed for the Primetime Emmy Award for Outstanding Variety Talk Series; prior to then, the genre competed against general variety shows for the Primetime Emmy Award for Outstanding Variety Series.

==== 2009–present ====
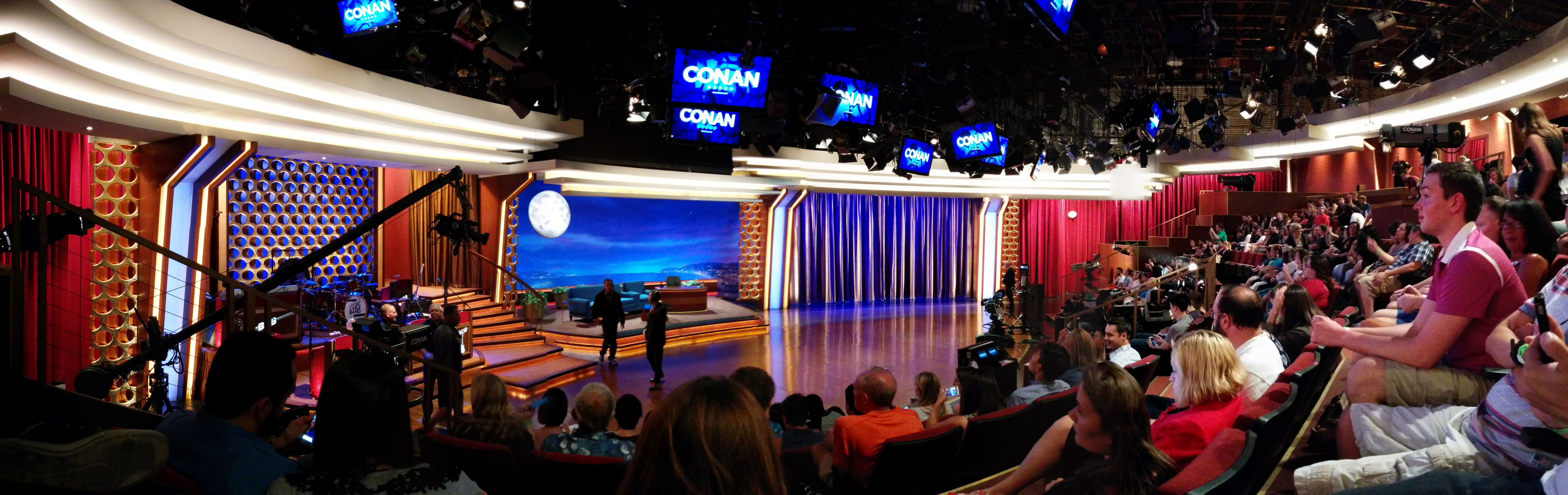
A panoramic view of the studio for Conan at Warner Bros. Studios in Burbank, featuring its audience area, band, and desk

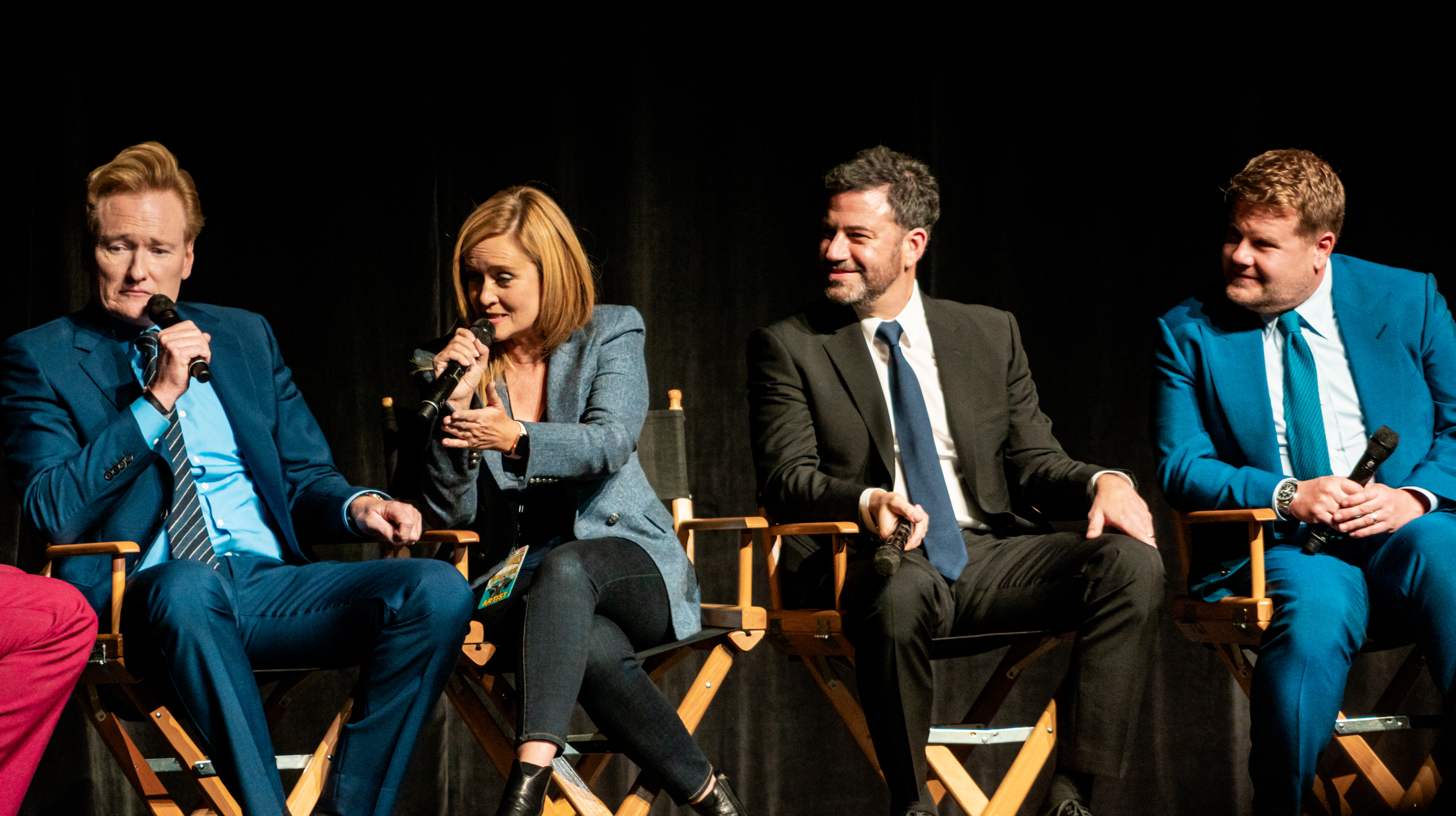
Late-night hosts Conan O'Brien, Samantha Bee, Jimmy Kimmel, and James Corden in 2018

Jay Leno hosted his final episode of The Tonight Show on May 29, 2009, with his successor Conan O'Brien, and musician James Taylor as his guests. O'Brien took over hosting duties on The Tonight Show with Conan O'Brien the following Monday, June 1, 2009.

As part of an effort to keep Leno with the network, NBC subsequently premiered The Jay Leno Show in September 2009. The series aired on weeknights in prime time at 10 p.m. ET/PT, and featured a similar format to Leno's incarnation of The Tonight Show. The Jay Leno Show faced dismal ratings, which also led to complaints from NBC affiliates that it was impacting the viewership of their late local newscasts.

On January 7, 2010, multiple media outlets reported that The Jay Leno Show would be moved to 11:35 p.m. and The Tonight Show with Conan O'Brien would be moved from 11:35 p.m. to 12:05 a.m. effective March 1, 2010, the first time in its history that the show would begin after midnight in the Eastern Time Zone. On January 12, 2010, O'Brien publicly announced in an open letter that he intended to leave NBC if it moved The Tonight Show to any timeslot after midnight in order to accommodate The Jay Leno Show at 11:35 p.m. ET. He felt it would damage the show's legacy, as it had always started after the late local news since it began in 1954.

After several days of negotiations, O'Brien reached a settlement with NBC that allowed him to leave The Tonight Show on January 22, 2010, ending his affiliation with NBC after 22 years. Leno began his second tenure as host of The Tonight Show on March 1, 2010, after the 2010 Winter Olympics, but only after major controversy. Leno's second Tonight iteration was taped at NBC's Studio 11 in Burbank, the former home of The Jay Leno Show, with a modified version of that show's set. After leaving NBC, O'Brien began hosting his new late night talk show, Conan, on TBS on November 8, 2010, after the non-compete clause in his NBC contract had lapsed.

In March 2013, news broke that NBC was expected to part ways with Leno for good after his contract expired in 2014, clearing the way for Fallon (whose tenure at Late Night had found success with a young, culturally savvy audience that was very desirable to advertisers) to take over The Tonight Show beginning that year, which also marked the 60th anniversary of the franchise. NBC confirmed the change on April 3, 2013. Under Fallon, the show returned to New York City, where the show originated from its 1954 debut until 1972; NBC no longer owns the former company-owned studios in Burbank where Carson and Leno's programs originated (O'Brien's Tonight Show taped at nearby Universal Studios). On May 13, 2013, it was announced that Fallon's former SNL castmate Seth Meyers would assume the duties of Late Night once Fallon moved to The Tonight Show. The Tonight Show Starring Jimmy Fallon debuted during NBC's coverage of the Winter Olympics in Russia on February 17, 2014, while Late Night with Seth Meyers debuted one week later.

2014 and 2015 saw a realignment to CBS's late night lineup: in April 2014, Craig Ferguson announced that he would leave The Late Late Show at the end of the year. On September 8, 2014, British actor and comedian James Corden was announced as the new host of The Late Late Show. His incarnation of the program was modelled more upon British chat shows such as The Graham Norton Show, de-emphasizing the monologue and relying on multiple guests present throughout the entire show (rather than interviewed individually). Meanwhile, in May 2015, David Letterman retired from Late Show, ending a 33-year career on late-night TV, and was succeeded the following September by Stephen Colbert—who departed from Comedy Central and The Colbert Report to host the program. On August 6, 2015, Jon Stewart also retired from The Daily Show (being succeeded by fellow cast member and South African comedian Trevor Noah), joining The Late Show with Stephen Colbert as an executive producer and occasional contributor.

The Late Show with Stephen Colbert achieved critical and ratings successes for its satire of the 2016 U.S. presidential election campaign and the presidency of Donald Trump; following the 2018–19 television season, it was the highest-rated late-night talk show overall for the third season in a row, and narrowly beat The Tonight Show in key demographic (18-to-49-year-old) viewership for the first time since 1994–95.

On February 12, 2019, NBC announced that Last Call with Carson Daly would conclude after its 2000th and final episode. Daly had already reduced his role on the program in 2013 due to his commitments to the Today Show and other projects. On September 16, 2019, NBC premiered A Little Late with Lilly Singh—a new talk show hosted by Indian-Canadian YouTuber Lilly Singh. She became the first openly bisexual person and the first person of Indian descent to host an American late-night talk show.

Due to the COVID-19 pandemic, nearly every American late-night talk shows were forced to impose major changes to their formats in March 2020 due to public health orders and restrictions on gatherings. They initially adopted formats produced remotely from their hosts' homes, with all guests appearing via videoconferencing. By July 2020, late-night shows began to migrate back to studio-based productions, but with reconfigured or different studios than normal with no audience and continued use of remote interviews. By October 2021, all late-night TV shows (with the exception of The Daily Show, which opted to continue without an audience as a stylistic choice) had full audiences return to their studio.

One of the few programs initially unaffected by COVID-19 restrictions was A Little Late, as it had already filmed the entirety of its first season in 2019. The program shifted to a home-based production for its second season in January 2021, with Singh citing both the pandemic and a creative preference against a traditional studio-based format. Singh opted not to continue A Little Late beyond 2021, and NBC returned the time slot to its affiliates. Conan concluded its run on June 24, 2021, with O'Brien having announced plans to produce a weekly "variety" show for HBO Max and focus on other digital media projects.

On January 17, 2023, it was announced that Craig Ferguson would make a return to late-night television with a new syndicated program from Sony Pictures Television, Channel Surf with Craig Ferguson; as opposed to The Late Late Show and other late-night shows, the program was pitched as having a specific focus on television as a topic, and air in a half-hour timeslot. Channel Surf never made it to series.

James Corden hosted his final episode of The Late Late Show on April 27, 2023, in a departure that was first announced a year prior. It was reported that CBS was reconsidering the future of the Late Late Show franchise in favor of lower-cost formats; in November 2023, the network officially announced that it would premiere a Taylor Tomlinson-hosted revival of @midnight—a comedy panel show previously aired by corporate sibling Comedy Central from 2013 through 2017—as a replacement in 2024. Its development and premiere had been delayed due to the Writers Guild of America and SAG-AFTRA strikes. CBS filled the Late Late Show timeslot with reruns and previously unaired episodes of Comics Unleashed. The revival, titled @fter Midnight, premiered on January 16, 2024. Tomlinson announced her resignation in March 2025, after which CBS discontinued programming the time slot once the last episodes aired in June and sold the airtime to Byron Allen, who promptly returned the time slot to Comics Unleashed.

Late-night talk show viewership had a brief peak in 2016 in the wake of retirements and new hosts but has been in steep decline since then. Conan O'Brien, in a 2023 interview, noted that several factors played into the decline, all of which impacted his decision to end Conan and focus on other projects, including a saturated market, the loss of the captive audience to video on demand options, and a changing culture that made it more difficult to make genuine fun of the culture (O'Brien, who tended to rely less on political humor than some of his contemporaries, cited Donald Trump as an example of a figure so polarizing that even those who do not like him would be repulsed by the mention of him, even in a satirical context, while those who are his fans would be offended). Leno remarked in 2025 that the current crop of hosts were more openly and consistently partisan (most of the existing hosts have openly favored Democrats) and less escapist than their predecessors, which had the potential to worsen audience fragmentation ("Now you have to be content with half the audience because you have to give your opinion"); Leno, who was not averse to political humor when hosting Tonight, generally split his jokes evenly between the two major parties. In a 2024 podcast, Jimmy Kimmel admitted that he only agreed to continue Jimmy Kimmel Live! because he feared he had no career options if the show were to end, also noting that he anticipated that within the next ten years, the networks would decide that the format was no longer cost-effective and cancel all of the remaining shows: "maybe there'll be one."

CBS was the first network to confirm Kimmel's predictions when Colbert announced in July 2025 that The Late Show would be canceled in May 2026 and that it would be exiting the late-night time slot with no replacement programming; CBS stated that the late-night format was no longer profitable, even though Colbert's was the top-rated in its genre, due to high production costs, audience fragmentation and declining advertising revenue. Kimmel disputed this claim as "nonsensical" but acknowledged that late-night programming was not profitable based on advertising alone and that the genre relied on earmarks from the network, paid through its stations' affiliate fees, to cover the remainder. Kimmel was suspended and his program pulled from the air for a portion of September 2025 following an affiliate revolt against comments Kimmel had made on the program regarding the assassination of conservative activist Charlie Kirk; the suspension would eventually be lifted later that month. Allen would later make a one-year purchase of the former Late Show timeslot for yet more Comics Unleashed; CBS stated that its plans for the time slot beyond 2027 are undecided but that the sale to Allen would establish "instant profitability" for the slot until a decision is made. CBS executive George Cheeks noted that if the network were to resume programming late nights, it would have to do so "with a different financial model."

== List of shows in Asia ==
=== Armenia ===
- ArmComedy (ATV; 2012–present)
- Late Night with Ara Kazaryan (Ուշ երեկոյան Արա Կազարյան հետ) (Armenia TV; 2015–2016)
- Nice Evening (Լավ երեկո) (Armenia 1; October 27, 2017 – December 31, 2019)
- Evening Azoyan (Երեկոյան Ազոյան) (Armenia TV; March 24 – June 9, 2018)
- Garik's Evening (Գարիկի Երեկոն) (Armenia TV; March 6 – May 16, 2021)

=== Azerbaijan ===
- 5-to-5 (5-də-5) (Khazar TV; 2012–2020)
- Against the good with Ilgar (Xeyrə qarşı) (Azad Azerbaijan TV; 2015–2017)
- Fateh's divan (Fatehin divanı) (İctimai Television; 2019–2022)
- 1aztv (AzTV; 2019–present)
- True news from Feli (Fəlidən doğru xəbər) (Khazar TV; 2020–present)
- Saturday evening (Şənbə axşamı) (İctimai Television; 2022–2023)
- Friday evening (Cümə axşamı) (İctimai Television; 2023–2025)

=== Georgia ===
- Vano's Show (ვანოს შოუ) (Rustavi 2; 2007–2019, Mtavari Arkhi; 2019–2025) is a Georgian version of the American TV program format that has existed since the 1950s and is extremely successful in the United States.
- Late Show With Giorgi Gabunia (ღამის შოუ გიორგი გაბუნიასთან ერთად) (Imedi TV; 2018–present)
- Night Show on First Channel (ღამის შოუ პირველზე) (First Channel; 2019–present)
- Late Show (გვიანი შოუ) (Rustavi 2; 2019–2020)
- Paata Guliashvilis and Nika Arabidze's show (პაატა გულიაშვილის და ნიკა არაბიძის შოუ) (Rustavi 2; 2024–present)

=== Hong Kong ===
- Celebrity Talk Show (今夜不設防) (ATV; 1989 – 1990)
- Sze U Tonight (今晚睇李) (TVB; 2015)

=== India ===
- Movers & Shakers (Sony Entertainment Television; 1997 – 2012)
- Koffee with Karan (Star One; 2004 – 2019)
- Comedy Circus (Sony Entertainment Television; 2007–2018)
- Comedy Nights with Kapil (Colors TV; 2013–2016)
- The Anupam Kher Show – Kucch Bhi Ho Sakta Hai (Colors TV; 2014–2015)
- The Late Night Show – Jitna Rangeen Utna Sangeen (Colors TV; 2014–2014)
- Comedy Nights Bachao (Colors TV; 2015–2017)
- The Kapil Sharma Show (Sony Entertainment Television; 2016 – present)
- Comedy Nights Live (Colors TV; 2016)
- Good Night India (Sony Entertainment Television; 2022)
- The Thugesh Show By Mahesh Keshwala (Thugesh YouTube Channel; 2023)

=== Indonesia ===
- Lepas Malam (Trans TV; 2004–2006)
- Hitam Putih (Trans7; 2010–2020)
- Ini Baru Empat Mata (Trans7; 2006–2020)
- Salam Canda (RCTI; 1992–1996)
- Angin Malam (RCTI; 2000–2004)
- Bincang Bintang (RCTI; 2004–2007)
- Buaya Show (Indosiar; 2012)
- Selayang Pandang (Indosiar; 1997–2000)
- Mel's Update (antv; 2012–2013)
- Intermezzo (MNCTV; 2012–2013)
- Night Project (Sindo TV; 2014–2015)
- Sebelas Duabelas (Kompas TV; 2014–2015)
- On The Show (RTV; 2014–2016)
- Tonight Show (NET.; 2013–present)
- Baim Kaga Jaim (RTV; 2015)
- Just Kidding (RTV; 2015)
- The Rooftop (Trans7; 2016)
- Nite Show (Metro TV; 2016)
- E-Talkshow (tvOne; 2017–present)
- Ada Show (Trans7; 2020–2021)
- Tukul Arwana One Man Show (Indosiar; 2020–2021)
- The Sultan (SCTV; 2020–2021)
- Master Show (RTV; 2020–2022)
- OOTD (Obrolan of the Day) (Trans7; 2020–2021)
- The Sultan Entertainment (SCTV; 2021–2022)
- Dewan Curhat (Trans7; 2021–2022)
- TRIG3RR (Trans7; 2022)
- Talksik (Trans TV; 2022)
- Lunite (RTV; 2022)
- Sweet Daddy (Trans TV)
- Heart Of Heart (Trans TV)
- The Sultan Empire (SCTV)
- Meet Nite Live (Metro TV; 2025–present)

=== Iran ===
- A Few Saturdays with Sina (چندشنبه با سینا) (MBC Persia; 2013–present)
- Khandevane (خندوانه) (IRIB Nasim; 2014–present)
- Dorehami (دورهمی) (IRIB Nasim; 2016–present)
- Mutual Friendship (هم‌رفیق "Hamrafigh") (Namava; 2020–present)
- Shab Ahangi

=== Iraq ===
- The night with Dadosh (اللية ويه دعدوش) (MBC Iraq; 2019–present)

=== Israel ===
- Haiom balila with Guri Alfi (היום בלילה עם גורי אלפי) (Channel 2; 30 December 2015 – 2018)

=== Japan ===
- 11PM (Nippon Television Network System; 1965–1990)
- Ametalk! (TV Asahi; 2003-)
- EX-Terebi (Nippon Television Network System; 1990–1994)
- Gilgamesh Night (TV Tokyo; 1991–1998)
- London Hearts (TV Asahi; 1999-)
- Tamori Club (TV Asahi; 1982–2023)

=== Kazakhstan ===
- Night studio (Túngi studio) (Qazaqstan; 2013–2019)
- New night studio (Жаңа түнгі студия) (Jibek joly; 2022–present)

=== Philippines ===
- Aquino & Abunda Tonight (ABS-CBN; February 10, 2014 – September 25, 2015)
- Cayetano in Action with Boy Abunda (GMA; February 5, 2023 – January 11, 2026)
- The Medyo Late Night Show with Jojo A. (The Somehow Late Night Show with Jojo A.) (RJTV; 2005–2007, Q; 2007–2009, TV5; 2009–2013, 2015; GMA; 2014–2017, PTV; 2018, RJDigiTV; 2020–Present)
- Tonight with Arnold Clavio (GMA News TV; 2011–2020, Q; 2010–2011)
- The Tim Yap Show (GMA; 2013–2015)
- Martin Late at Night (ABS-CBN; March 1–May 31, 2013)
- Martin Late at Nite (ABS-CBN; 1998–2003)
- Martin After Dark (GMA; 1988–1993, ABS-CBN; 1993–1998)
- Oh No! It's Johnny! (ABS-CBN; 1987–1999)
- Show & Tell (GMA; 1994–1995)
- Gandang Gabi Vice (Good Evening Vice) (ABS-CBN; May 22, 2011 – March 8, 2020, GMA; September 13, 2026 – present)
- Tonight with Boy Abunda (ABS-CBN; September 28, 2015 – May 4, 2020)
- The Boobay and Tekla Show (GMA; January 27, 2019 – present)
- PIE Night Long (PIE Channel; 2022)
- The SPG Show (PIE Channel; 2023)
- What's Up Doods? (TV5; 2013)

=== South Korea ===
- SNL (Saturday Night Live) (tvN; 2011–present)
- Journalism Talk Show J (KBS1; June 2018 – present)

=== Tajikistan ===
- Tonight (Имшаб) (Tajikistan TV; 2015–present)

=== Thailand ===
- Tonight's the Night (Channel 3; premiered on March 5, 2016)
- The Daily Show (Channel 7 HD)
- Talk Ka-thoey Tonight (GMMTV)

=== Uzbekistan ===
- MTV Show (Milliy TV; September, 2016–present)

=== Vietnam ===
- Cuộc hẹn cuối tuần (VTV3; 2021–present)

== List of shows in Africa ==
=== South Africa ===
- WtfTumi on SABC 3
- TRENDING SA on SABC 3

=== Algeria ===
- Le Grand Sbitar (literal translation: The Grand Hospital) on Nessma then Echourouk TV; 2013–2016

=== Kenya ===
- The Trend on NTV

=== Madagascar ===
- Takariva mafana an'i Mija Rasolo (2014–present)

=== Morocco ===
- Rachid Show on 2M TV (2013–present) Host: Rachid Allali

=== Nigeria ===
- Highlites with IK on Africa Magic Showcase (2014 – 2017) Host: IK Osakioduwa

- DRC (Congo)

Le #ChezfrancisKakondeshow on Antenne A Monday/Wednesday and Friday at 23h30 (20th season) since 2003–2023

Host: Francis Kakonde

== List of shows in the Americas ==
=== Brazil ===
- Jô Soares Onze e Meia (SBT; 1988–1999)
- Programa do Jô (Rede Globo; 2000–2016)
- Agora É Tarde com Danilo Gentili (Band; 2011–2013)
  - Agora É Tarde, hosted by Rafinha Bastos (Band; 2014–2015)
- Luciana by Night, hosted by Luciana Gimenez (RedeTV!; 2012–2021)
- The Noite com Danilo Gentili (SBT; 2014–present)
- Programa do Porchat (RecordTV; 2016–2018)
- Lady Night, hosted by Tatá Werneck (Multishow; 2017–present)
- Conversa com Bial (TV Globo; 2017–present) (GNT; 2024–present)
- Greg News com Gregório Duvivier (HBO; 2017–2023)
- Que História é Essa, Porchat? (GNT; 2019–present)

=== Canada ===
- The Hour/George Stroumboulopoulos Tonight (CBC; 2009–2012, primetime from 2005 to 2009 and 2012 to 2014)
- Ed & Red's Night Party (Citytv; 1995–2008)
- The Mike Bullard Show (Global; 2003–2004)
- Open Mike with Mike Bullard (CTV; 1997–2003)
- Friday Night! with Ralph Benmergui (CBC; 1993, primetime from 1992 to 1993)
- Canada After Dark with Paul Soles (CBC; 1978–79)
- Nightcap (CBC; 1963–67)
- Charlie Had One But He Didn't Like It, So He Gave It To Us (CBC; 1966)
- 90 Minutes Live with Peter Gzowski (CBC; 1976–1978)
- It's Only Rock & Roll (CBC; 1987)
- The Being Frank Show (CHCH; 2010–present)
- Le Grand Blond avec un show sournois with Marc Labrèche (TVA; 2001–2003)
- La Fin du monde est à 7 heures with Marc Labrèche (TQS; 1997–2000)
- En mode Salvail with Eric Salvail (V; 2013–2017)
- Le Ti-Mé show with Ti-Mé Paré (Ici Radio-Canada Télé; 2014–2016)
- Le Show de Rousseau with Stéphane Rousseau (V; 2018)
- La semaine des 4 Julie with Julie Snyder (V; 2020)

=== Colombia ===
- Yo, José Gabriel with José Gabriel Ortiz (RCN; 1998-2007 and 2019–present) (Caracol 2010–2011)
- The Suso's Show with Dany Alejandro Hoyos (Caracol; 2009–present)

=== Mexico ===
- SNSerio with Gabo Ramos (Canal 6; 2016–present)

== List of shows in Australia ==
- Tonight Live with Steve Vizard (1990–1993)
- The Late Show (1992–1993)
- Rove (1999–2009)
- Sam Pang Tonight (2025–present)

== List of shows in Europe ==
=== Albania ===
- Xing me Ermalin (Tv Klan, 2016–present)
- 6 dite pa Ermalin (Top Channel, 2014–2016)

=== Austria ===
- Willkommen Österreich with Stermann & Grissemann (ORF 1; 2007–present)
- Gute Nacht Österreich with Peter Klien (ORF 1; 2019–present)
- Bussi Fussi with Rudi Fussi (Puls 24; 2020–present)

=== Belarus ===
- Макаёнка, 9 (Belarus–1; 2018–2020)

=== Belgium ===
- Gert Late Night (VIER, 2017–present)
- Le Dan Late Show (La Deux, 2014–2016)
- De Laatste Show (Eén, 1999–2012)

=== Bulgaria ===
- Slavi's Show (bTV, 2000–2019)
- Azis's Evening show (TV2: 2007–2009, PRO.BG: 2009–2010)
- Ivan & Andrey's Show (Nova TV, 2009–2011)
- Of stubborn (TV7, Nova TV, 2010–2011)
- bTV's Late Show (bTV, 2017)
- Mavrikov's Show (Eurocom, 2018–present)
- Slavi Trifonov's Evening show (7/8 TV, 2019–present)
- Saturday Night with Donny (BNT 1, 2020)
- Nikolaos Tsitiridis' Show (bTV, 2020–2023)
- Saturday Night with Mitko Pavlov (BNT 1, 2020–2021)
- Saturday Night with BNT (BNT 1, 2022–2023)
- The Evening Show (BNT 1, 2023–present)

=== Czech Republic ===
- Show Jana Krause (TV Prima; 2010–present)
- Uvolněte se, prosím (Czech Television; 2004–2010)
- Show Leoše Mareše (TV Prima; 2015)
- 7 pádů Honzy Dědka (TV Prima; 2011-present)

=== Finland ===
- Anteeksi kuinka? (MTV3, 1993–1996)
- Joonas Nordman Show (MTV3, 2020–present)
- Kovan viikon ilta (YLE, 2023-present)

=== France ===
- Zen avec Maxime Biaggi et Grimkujow (Twitch, 2022–2024)
- Le Late avec Alain Chabat (TF1, 2022)
- On n'est pas couché (France 2, 2006–2020)
- Claudy Show (France Ô; 2013–2015)
- Ce Soir avec Arthur (Comédie +, 2010–2012; TF1, 2013)
- La nuit nous appartient (NRJ 12;Comédie +, 2009–2012)
- L'habit ne fait pas Lemoine (France 2, 2009)
- La Méthode Cauet (TF1; 2003–2008)

=== Germany ===
- Schmidteinander (WDR: 1990–1993; Das Erste: 1994)
- Gottschalk Late Night (RTL: 1992–1995)
- RTL Nachtshow (RTL: 1994–1995)
- Harald Schmidt Show (Sat.1: 1995–2003, 2011–2012; Sky Atlantic HD, Sky Hits HD: 2012–2014), Harald Schmidt (Das Erste: 2004–2007, 2009–2011)
- Late Lounge (hr: 1999–2005), Late Lounge Club (hr: 2005–2006)
- TV Total (ProSieben: 1999–2015, 2021–present)
- SWR3 Ring frei! (SWR: 2003–2007), SWR3 latenight (SWR: 2007–2015), Die Pierre M. Krause Show (SWR: 2016–present)
- Anke Late Night (Sat.1: 2004)
- Sarah Kuttner – Die Show (VIVA: 2004–2005), Kuttner (MTV: 2005–2006)
- Schmidt & Pocher (Das Erste: 2007–2009)
- Inas Nacht (NDR: 2007–2009; Das Erste: 2009–present)
- Die Kurt Krömer Show (rbb: 2003–2005), Krömer – Die Internationale Show (rbb: 2007–2011), Krömer – Late Night Show (Das Erste: 2012–2014)
- Die Oliver Pocher Show (Sat.1: 2009–2011)
- MTV Home (MTV: 2009–2011)
- Heute-show (ZDF: 2009–present)
- Stuckrad–Barre (ZDFneo: 2010–2012; Tele 5: 2012–2013)
- NeoParadise (ZDFneo: 2011–2013)
- Circus HalliGalli (ProSieben: 2013–2017)
- Neo Magazin (ZDFneo: 2013–2014), Neo Magazin Royale (ZDFneo, ZDF: 2015–2019), ZDF Magazin Royale (ZDF: 2020–present)
- Geht's noch?! Kayas Woche (RTL: 2014–2015)
- Promi Big Brother – Late Night Live (sixx: 2014), Promi Big Brother – Die Late Night Show (sixx: 2015–2016)
- Der Klügere kippt nach (Tele 5: 2015)
- Luke! Die Woche und ich (Sat.1: 2015–2020)
- Boomarama Late Night (Tele 5: 2015–2016), Boomarama 3000 (Tele 5: 2017–present)
- Ringlstetter (BR: 2016–present)
- Late Night Berlin (ProSieben: 2018–2025)
- Late Night Alter (ZDFneo: 2020–2021)
- Edins Neo Night (ZDFneo: 2024–2025)
- Till Tonight (ZDFneo: 2025)

=== Greece ===
- Radio Arvyla (ANT1, 2008–2018, Skai TV, 2019, Open TV, 2021–present)
- Ellinofreneia (Skai TV, 2008–2011; Alpha TV, 2013–2017)
- Al Tsantiri News (Alpha TV, 2004–2016; Open TV, 2019–present)
- A.M.A.N. (Mega Channel, 1996–1997; ANT1, 1997–2000), A.M.A.N. Ta Katharmata (ANT1, 2000–2007)
- Comfusio (ERT3, 1993–1994; Star Channel, 1994–1996)
- The 2Night Show (ANT1, 2015–present)

=== Hungary ===
- Heti dörgés with Géza Villám (Comedy Central, 2019)
- Frizbi with Péter Hajdú
  - ATV, 2006–2008, 2016–2018 as Esti Frizbi
  - Story TV, 2009 as Esti Frizbi
  - TV2, 2010–2016 as Frizbi
  - LifeTV, 2021–2022 as Frizbi
  - YouTube, 2022–present as Frizbi

2020-2025 Task master

- Fábry (M1, 2012–2015; Duna TV, 2015–present)
- Heti Hetes (RTL Klub, 1999–2012; RTL2, 2012–2016)
- Showtime with Péter Hajdú (TV2, 2016)
- Kasza! (Super TV2, 2013–2014; TV2, 2015)
- Esti Showder with Sándor Fábry (M1, 1998; RTL Klub, 1999–2011)
- Light Night with László Lovász (Prizma TV, 2011)
- Késő este with András Hajós (Viasat 3, 2004)
- Magánszám with András Hajós (TV2, 2003)
- Boros-Bochkor Show (TV2, 2001–2002)
- Friderikusz Show (M1, 1992–1997)

=== Iceland ===
- Vikan með Gísla Marteini (RÚV; 2015–present)

=== Ireland ===
- The Late Late Show (RTÉ; 1962–present)
- The Tommy Tiernan Show (RTÉ; 2017–present)
- Saturday Night with Miriam (RTÉ; 2005–present)
- The Ray D'Arcy Show (RTÉ; 2015–present)
- The Saturday Night Show (RTÉ; 2010–2015)
- Kenny Live (RTÉ; 1988–1999)
- Good Grief Moncrieff! (RTÉ; 1996)
- Kennedy (RTÉ; 1997)
- Tubridy Tonight (RTÉ; 2004–2009)
- Tonight with Craig Doyle (RTÉ; 2010)

=== Italy ===
- E poi c'è Cattelan (Sky Uno; 2014–2020)
- Stasera c'è Cattelan su Rai 2 (Rai 2; 2022–2025)
- Gazebo (Rai 3; 2013–2017)
- Victor Victoria – niente è come sembra (La7; 2009–2010)
- Very Victoria (MTV; 2005-2008)
- Che tempo che fa (Rai 3, Rai 1, Rai 2, Nove; 2003–present)
- Satyricon (Rai 2; 2001)
- Maurizio Costanzo Show (Rete 4-Canale 5; 1982–2009;2015–2022)
- Barracuda (Italia 1; 1999)
- Volo in diretta (Rai 3; 2012-2013)
- Il grande cocomero (Rai 2; 2013)
- Sorci verdi (Rai 2; 2015)
- Bionda anomala (All Music; 2008-2009)

=== Latvia ===
- Evening with Renārs Zeltiņš (Vakars ar Renāru Zeltiņu; LTV1; 17 October 2014 – 18 December 2015)
- Midnight Show at Seven (Pusnakts šovs septiņos; 7 November 2014–present)
- Late Show with Streips (Vēlais ar Streipu; RīgaTV24, 29 February 2016–present)

=== Lithuania ===
- Gero vakaro šou (TV3; premiered on August 31, 2016)
- Laikykitės ten (Laisvės TV)

=== Netherlands ===
- Barend & Van Dorp (RTL 4; 1990-2005/Talpa; 2005–2006)
- RTL Late Night (RTL 4; 2013–2019)
- Pauw & Witteman (VARA; 2006–2014)
- De Avondshow met Arjen Lubach (VPRO; 2022–2024)

=== Norway ===
- Senkveld med HC og Tommy – TV2 (2001–2002)
- Senkveld med Thomas og Harald – TV2 (2003–2018)
- Senkveld med Stian og Helene – TV2 (2018–2021)
- Lindmo – NRK (2012–2024)
- I kveld med Ylvis – TVNorge (2011–2016)
- Først & sist – NRK (1998–2007), Skavlans first talk show
- Skavlan – NRK/SVT/TV2 (2009–2021) (Recorded in Sweden, England and the U.S., broadcast on Swedish and Norwegian television. The host is Norwegian)
- Else – TV2 (2013–2014)
- Kåss til kvelds – NRK (2020–2023)
- Else! – TVNorge (2024 – present)

=== Poland ===
- Kuba Wojewódzki (Polsat; 2002–2006; tvn: 2006–present)
- Wieczór z Wampirem (RTL7; 1997–1999)
- Wieczór z Jagielskim (TVP2; 1999–2001)
- Szymon Majewski Show (tvn; 2005–2011)
- Szymon Na Żywo (tvn; 2012)

=== Portugal ===
- 5 Para A Meia-Noite (RTP1)

=== Romania ===
- Chestiunea Zilei cu Florin Călinescu (1998 – 2004) (Pro TV; Tele7ABC)
- Noaptea Târziu cu Mircea Badea și Oreste (1999–2002) (Antena 1)
- Show de Seară cu Viorel Dragu (Comedy Central Extra) (April 3, 2017 – present)
- Starea Nației cu Dragoș Pătraru (PrimaTV)

=== Russia ===
- Good Night (Добрый вечер; RTR (РТР); 1997–1998)
- Once in the Night (Однажды вечером; TNT (ТНТ); 1999–2001)
- Good Night with Maxim (Добрый вечер с Максимом; RTR (Россия 1); 2011)
- Evening Urgant (Вечерний Ургант; Channel One (Первый канал); April 16, 2012 – February 25, 2022)
- Nightly Herasimets (Вечерний Герасимец; TV Rain (Дождь); 2012–2013)
- Volya’s Show (Шоу Воли; TNT (ТНТ); April 16, 2023 – present)

=== Serbia ===
- 24 minuta sa Zoranom Kesićem (2013—present)
- Veče sa Ivanom Ivanovićem (2010–present)
- Marko Živić Show (2007)
- Oralno doba (2007–2008)
- Fajront Republika (2008–2011)

=== Slovakia ===
- Adela show (Markíza; 2010–2012)
- Neskoro večer s Petrom Marcinom (Jednotka; 2014–present)

=== Spain ===
- La noche se mueve (Telemadrid; 1992–1993)
- Sense titol (TV3; 1995)
- Esta noche cruzamos el Mississippi (Telecinco; 1995–1997)
- La noche prohibida (Antena 3; 1996)
- Sense titol 2 (TV3; 1996)
- Efecto F (Antena 3; 1997)
- Sense titol, Sense Vacances (TV3; 1997)
- Crónicas marcianas (Telecinco; 1997–2005)
- La sonrisa del pelícano (Antena 3; 1997)
- Sense titol, s/n (TV3; 1998)
- La cosa nostra (TV3; 1999–2002)
- La Central (Antena 3; 2000)
- Maldita la hora (Antena 3; 2001)
- Abierto al anochecer (Antena 3; 2002)
- Una altra cosa (TV3; 2002–2004)
- UHF (Antena 3; 2004)
- TNT (Telecinco; 2004–2007)
- Noche sin tregua (Paramount Comedy; 2004–2007)
- Buenafuente (Antena 3; 2005–2007, laSexta; 2007–2011)
- La azotea de Wyoming (La Primera; 2005)
- Plan C (Telecinco; 2005)
- Ruffus & Navarro (La Primera; 2005–2006)
- Noche Hache (Cuatro; 2005–2008)
- El Hormiguero (Cuatro, 2006–2011; Antena 3, 2011–present)
- Sabías a lo que venías (laSexta; 2007)
- Sálvame deluxe / Deluxe (Telecinco; 2009–2023)
- La semana más larga (Canal Sur; 2010–2013)
- UAU! (Cuatro; 2010)
- En el aire (laSexta; 2013–2015)
- Se enciende la noche (Telecinco; 2013–2014)
- Hable con ellas (Telecinco; 2014–2015; also had a brief prime time run in 2016)
- Alaska y Segura (La 1; 2015; also had previous prime time runs on La 2 as Torres y Reyes and Alaska y Coronas in 2013–2014)
- El último mono (laSexta; 2015)
- Late Motiv (Canal+/#0; 2016–2021)
- La Resistencia (#0/Movistar Plus+; 2018–2024)
- Hoy no se sale (Ubeat; 2019–2022)
- Las que faltaban (#0; 2019)
- Animales nocturnos (Telecinco; 2020)
- Los felices veinte (Canal Orange; 2020–2022)
- Esto es un late (Amazon Prime Video via Twitch; 2021–2022)
- Late Xou amb Marc Giró / Late Xou con Marc Giró (TVE Catalunya/La 2 and RTVE Play; 2023–2026)
- La revuelta (La 1 and RTVE Play; 2024–present)
- Cara al show con Marc Giró (laSexta; 2026–present)

=== Switzerland ===
- Night Moor with Dieter Moor (Swiss Television; 1997–1999)
- Giacobbo/Müller Late Service Public (Swiss Television; 2008–2016)
- Deville Deville Late Night with Dominic Deville (Swiss Television; 2016–heute)
- 52 Minutes with Vincent Kucholl and Vincent Veillon (Swiss Television; 2020-)

=== Ukraine ===
- 15 Minutes till Tomorrow (15 хвилин до завтра; K1; 2011–2012)
- Evening. Pasha. Stars (Вечір. Паша. Зорі; K1; 2012)
- Crazy Week (Шалений тиждень; TVi; 2012)
- Проти ночі (TVi; 2012)
- ЧистоNEWS (1+1, March 23, 2012 – present)
- Pedan-Prytula Show (Педан-Притула Шоу; Novyi Kanal (Новий канал); March 10, 2013 – 2014)
- Uteodyn with Michael Shchur (Утеодин з Майклом Щуром; UA:First (UA:Перший); October 18, 2014 – July 25, 2015)
- Lumpen Show (NLO TV, 2015—September 29, 2017)
- ЧереЩур (UA:First, 2017)
- The Evening with Nataliya Garipova (Вечір з Наталею Гаріповою; STB (СТБ); March 3, 2018)
- The Evening Show with Yuriy Marchenko (Вечірнє шоу з Юрієм Марченком; UA:First (UA:Перший); 2018)
- Kondratyuk on Monday (Кондратюк у понеділок; 5 Kanal (5 канал); September 21, 2020–present)
- Fierce Ukrainization with Antin Mukharsky (Люта українізація з Антіном Мухарським; 4 Kanal (uk) (4 канал); December 18, 2020–present)
- Dizel Night (STB (СТБ); March 6, 2021–present)

=== United Kingdom ===
- Parkinson (BBC One; 1971–1982, 1998–2004, ITV; 1987–1988, 2004–2007)
- Des O'Connor Tonight (BBC Two; 1977–1982, ITV; 1983–1999, 2001–2002)
- Wogan (BBC One; 1982–1992)
- The Late Clive James (ITV; 1983–1987)
- Aspel & Company (ITV; 1984–1993)
- Joan Rivers: Can We Talk? (BBC Two; 1986)
- The Last Resort with Jonathan Ross (Channel 4; 1987–1988)
- Saturday Night Clive (BBC Two; 1989–1990, BBC One; 1991)
- Clive Anderson Talks Back (Channel 4; 1989–1996)
- Saturday Matters with Sue Lawley (BBC One; 1989)
- Tonight with Jonathan Ross (Channel 4; 1990–1992)
- Terry Wogan's Friday Night (BBC One; 1992–1993)
- Sunday Night Clive (BBC One; 1994)
- The Danny Baker Show (BBC One; 1994–1995)
- The Clive James Show (ITV; 1995–1998)
- The Frank Skinner Show (BBC One; 1995–1999; ITV; 2000–2005)
- The Gaby Roslin Show (Channel 4; 1996)
- Clive Anderson All Talk (BBC One; 1996–1999)
- The Late Jonathan Ross (Channel 4; 1996)
- The Jack Docherty Show (Channel 5; 1997–1999)
- Friday Night's All Wright (Channel 5; 1998–2000)
- So Graham Norton (Channel 4; 1998–2002)
- Patrick Kielty Almost Live (BBC One; 1999–2003)
- The Richard Blackwood Show (Channel 4; 1999–2001)
- The Brian Conley Show (ITV; 2000–2002)
- Clive Anderson NOW (Channel 5; 2001)
- Friday Night with Jonathan Ross (BBC One; 2001–2010)
- Johnny Vaughan Tonight (BBC One; 2002–2003)
- V Graham Norton (Channel 4; 2002–2003)
- The Ralf Little Show (BBC Choice; 2002)
- God Almighty (Channel 5; 2003)
- Graham Norton's Bigger Picture (BBC One; 2005–2006)
- Wogan Now & Then (UK GOLD; 2006)
- The Charlotte Church Show (Channel 4; 2006–2008)
- Russell Brand's Got Issues (E4; 2006)
- The Russell Brand Show (Channel 4; 2006)
- The Graham Norton Show (BBC Two; 2007–2009, BBC One; 2009–present)
- Lily Allen and Friends (BBC Three; 2008)
- The Justin Lee Collins Show (ITV2; 2009)
- Piers Morgan's Life Stories (ITV; 2009–2023)
- Alan Carr: Chatty Man (Channel 4; 2009–2017)
- Justin Lee Collins: Good Times (Channel 5; 2010)
- Frank Skinner's Opinionated (BBC Two; 2010–2011)
- Paul O'Grady Live (ITV; 2010–2011)
- The Rob Brydon Show (BBC Two; 2010–2012)
- The Jonathan Ross Show (ITV; 2011–present)
- Parkinson: Masterclass (Sky Arts; 2012–2014)
- The Michael McIntyre Chat Show (BBC One; 2014)
- Up Late with Rylan (Channel 5; 2016)
- Alan Carr: Happy Hour (Channel 4; 2016)
- John Bishop: In Conversation With... (W; 2016–2018)
- The Nightly Show (ITV; 2017)
- The John Bishop Show (ITV; 2022–2023)
- The Chris & Rosie Ramsey Show (BBC Two; 2022, BBC One; 2023)

==== Mock chat shows ====
- The Dame Edna Experience (ITV; 1987–1989)
- The Word (Channel 4; 1990–1995)
- Room 101 (BBC Two; 1994–2007, BBC One; 2012–2018)
- Knowing Me, Knowing You with Alan Partridge (BBC Two; 1994–1995)
- The Mrs Merton Show (BBC Two; 1995, BBC One; 1996–1998)
- TFI Friday (Channel 4; 1996–2000, 2015)
- Da Ali G Show (Channel 4; 2000, HBO; 2003–2004)
- Meet Ricky Gervais (Channel 4; 2000)
- The Kumars at No. 42 (BBC Two; 2001–2004, BBC One; 2005–2006, Sky One 2014)
- This Is Dom Joly (BBC Three; 2003)
- The Keith Barret Show (BBC Two; 2004–2005)
- OFI Sunday (Channel 4; 2005)
- Man to Man with Dean Learner (Channel 4; 2006)
- TV Heaven, Telly Hell (Channel 4; 2006–2007)
- Al Murray's Happy Hour (ITV; 2007–2008)
- The Dame Edna Treatment (ITV; 2007)
- Carpool (Dave; 2010–2011)
- That Sunday Night Show (ITV; 2011–2012)
- Comic's Choice (Channel 4; 2011)
- The Angelos Epithemiou Show (Channel 4; 2011–2012)
- The Last Leg (Channel 4; 2012–present)
- Backchat with Jack Whitehall and His Dad (BBC Three; 2013–2014, BBC Two; 2015)
- All Round to Mrs. Brown's (BBC One; 2017–2020)
- The Russell Howard Hour (Sky One; 2018–2022)
- The Big Narstie Show (Channel 4; 2018–2022)
- This Time with Alan Partridge (BBC One; 2019–2021)
- The Lateish Show with Mo Gilligan (Channel 4; 2019–2023)
