= VIVA Hungary =

- Country: Hungary

Programming
- Language: Hungarian
- Picture format: 576i (16:9 SDTV)

Ownership
- Owner: Viacom International Media Networks Europe
- Sister channels: MTV Hungary

History
- Launched: 27 June 1997
- Closed: 3 October 2017; 8 years ago
- Replaced by: Comedy Central Family, MTV Hits
- Former names: Z+ (1997–2001); VIVA+ (2001–2003)

Links
- Website: vivatv.hu

VIVA Hungary was a Hungarian pay television music channel that was launched on 27 June 1997 as Z+. Like its sister channels MTV and VH1, VIVA Hungary featured localised music videos, programming, presenters and chart shows. It shut down on October 3, 2017, replaced by Comedy Central Family or MTV Hits, depending on the providers.

== History ==
The channel was created by HBO Europe (HBO Europe since 2012) on 27 June 1997 as Z+, one year after the closure of the first Hungarian music channel Top TV. Its first music video was Ilyenek voltunk by Ákos Kovács. Being the only music channel produced for and by Hungarians, it gave access for new and emerging local artists. In February 2001, it was acquired by the German VIVA Media AG and was renamed VIVA+ on 4 June 2001. The + was removed from the channel name on 7 January 2002, after which the existing German channel gradually left Hungarian cable companies.

On 15 July 2010, Viacom transferred its license from Hungary to the Czech Republic, causing it to lose the Hungarian content ratings system.

The last music video played on the channel was Számolj Hármat by FISH!.

== Programmes ==
- Chillout Zone
- Egytől Három
- Hazai Pálya (local chart)
- Mayo Chix Divatvilág
- Megálló
- Napi Top 10
- Party Sounds
- Plain Jane
- Randikommandó
- RandomMarci
- Spongyabob Kockanadrág
- Szülinap Luxuskivitelben
- UK Chart
- US Chart
- Út a Csúcsra
- VIVA Chart Show
- VIVA Interaktív
- VIVA Night Sounds
- VIVA Online Chart
- VIVA Sounds
- VIVA Vekker
- World Stage
- Presenters:
- VJ Ada (2003−2010)
- VJ Ben (2008−2010)
- VJ Zola (2006−2011)
- VJ Eszti (2010–2017)
- VJ Marci(2011–2012)
- Sanyóca (only in Megálló, 2012–2017)
- Pizsu (2012–2015)
- Marcell (2012–2017)

== Logos ==
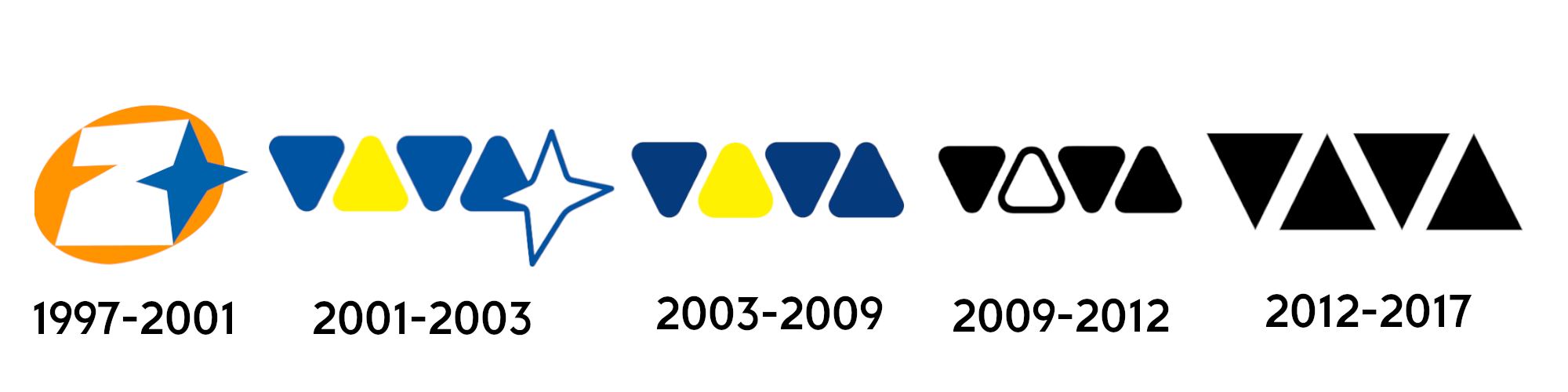
