= Late Night Republic =

American syndicated late-night television talk show

- Genre: Late-night talk show
- Presented by: Jake Sasseville
- Country of origin: United States
- Original language: English
- No. of episodes: 22

Original release
- Release: August 6, 2010 – February 10, 2011

Late Night Republic was an American syndicated late-night television talk show. It was hosted by Jake Sasseville, who also served as an executive producer. The show featured celebrity and "on the street" interviews by Sasseville, sketch comedy bits, and musical performances. It was based in New York, New York.

Sasseville previously hosted The Edge with Jake Sasseville, which he began on local public-access television cable TV television in Maine in 2001. He said that the new show reflected his maturity. "The humor I used to have was indicative of the age I was at the time,” he said.

== Content ==
Sasseville noted that some show content would come directly from viewers, who might offer content and ideas over social networks, adding that by 2011, the show would be "exclusively" produced by viewers. He has indicated that the audience demographic is 16-to-24-years of age.

Early episodes featured interviews with comedian and actor Michael Ian Black and actress Blanchard Ryan, along with a variety of sketch comedy, interview, and music segments. The show does not appear to tape in a single studio and instead resorts to on-location filming in New York or against a white background.

== Distribution ==
Late Night Republic aired one night a week on various Fox, MyNetworkTV, and CW stations. Since Sasseville's production company, Jake Entertainment Inc., secures syndication deals with individual stations, timeslots varied by city. In September 2010, Sasseville launched a publicity campaign to keep the show on the air in San Diego, California, after ratings for "The Edge" put "Late Night Republic's" standing in peril on the XETV station.

The program also aired full episodes on its web site.

== Sponsorship ==
By securing funding directly from advertisers instead of television networks, Late Night Republic appeared to be following a non-traditional financing model. Sasseville heavily promoted the Procter & Gamble Pringles Xtreme brand during the show, including an interactive contest sponsored by Pringles where viewers can submit comedic videos for judging by Sasseville.

He was quoted saying that he was comfortable with obvious brand integrations into his show. "If you let your audience in to know that this is what you have to do to make sure that you can pay the bills, they get it and they're okay with it," Sasseville told an interviewer. "It's when people start to try to hide it that it becomes slippery slope."

== Marketing ==
In September 2010, Sasseville began visiting 45 cities during the fall season as part of a road trip to promote Late Night Republic. That trip was sponsored by FRS Healthy Energy, and included 15 concert performances as part of Sasseville's Pringles Xtreme Campus Tour. We The Kings and J. Cole were the headlining performances on that tour.
