= Comedy Central Family =

Comedy Central Family was a spin-off channel of Comedy Central in 3 European countries:

- Comedy Central Family (Netherlands), closed on 31 May 2018
- Polsat Comedy Central Extra, originally known as Comedy Central Family Poland until 3 March 2020
- Comedy Central Family (Hungary), closed on 6 July 2024
