= Comedy Central Family (Hungary) =

Comedy Central-branded channel

- Country: Hungary
- Broadcast area: Hungary
- Network: Comedy Central

Programming
- Picture format: 576i 16:9 (SDTV)

Ownership
- Owner: Paramount International Networks
- Sister channels: MTV, VH1, Nickelodeon, Nick Jr., Comedy Central, NickToons, Paramount Network, TeenNick

History
- Launched: 3 October 2017; 8 years ago
- Replaced: VIVA; Comedy Central Extra
- Closed: 6 July 2024; 23 months ago

Comedy Central Family was a Hungarian television channel, focused on airing family and humorous comedy series.

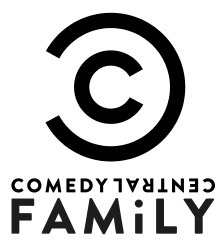
2017-2019 logo

== History ==
On July 26, 2017, when Viacom announced the launch of a new humor channel entirely in Hungarian, which started October 3, 2017, replacing both VIVA and Comedy Central Extra.

On June 4, 2019, Comedy Central and Comedy Central Family received a new logo and a new look.

The channel was canceled on July 6, 2024.

== Programming ==
=== Final Programming ===
Sources:

- Awkward
- Instant Mom
- The King of Queens
- Kung Fu Panda: Legends of Awesomeness
- The Middle
- Most Ridiculous
- The Neighborhood
- The Penguins of Madagascar
- SpongeBob SquarePants
- See Dad Run
- Young Sheldon

=== Former Programming ===
Sources:

- Alone Together
- Baby Daddy
- Dharma & Greg
- Fresh of the Boat
- The Goldbergs
- Friends
- How I Met You Mother
- Life in Pieces
- Melissa & Joey
- Mike & Molly
- My Wife and Kids
- New Girl
- Simon's Cat
- Speechless
- Suburgatory
- Takeshi's Castle Indonesia
