= 90 Minutes Live =

Canadian television late-night talk show

- Genre: Talks show
- Presented by: Peter Gzowski
- Country of origin: Canada
- Original language: English

Production
- Running time: 90 minutes

Original release
- Network: CBC
- Release: April 19, 1976 – May 12, 1978

90 Minutes Live is a Canadian television late-night talk show, which aired on CBC Television from April 19, 1976, to May 12, 1978. The program aired weekday evenings at 11:30 p.m.

Hosted by Peter Gzowski, the program was patterned after CBC Radio's This Country in the Morning, with both current affairs and entertainment features. Other personalities associated with the program included Allan Fotheringham, Rick Moranis, Andre Gagnon, Anne Ditchburn, Danny Finkleman, Valri Bromfield, John Harvard and Flo & Eddie.

The program was not successful with CBC audiences, and was replaced in 1978 by Canada After Dark.
