= Luciana by Night =

Brazilian late-night talk show

- Genre: Talk show
- Presented by: Luciana Gimenez
- Starring: Diogo Portugal
- Country of origin: Brazil
- Original language: Portuguese

Production
- Running time: 75 minutes

Original release
- Network: RedeTV!
- Release: November 27, 2012 – present

Luciana by Night is a Brazilian weekly late-night talk show hosted by Luciana Gimenez and broadcast by RedeTV! since November 27, 2012.

== Format ==
Different from Superpop, another TV show hosted by Gimenez, Luciana by Night follows the format of the popular late-night talk shows in the U.S. television.

== Announcement ==
RedeTV! announced Luciana by Night to the public in a press conference held at the RedeTV! studios, located in Osasco, on November 21, 2012, a week before the show's debut.

In the press conference, Gimenez showed that like to watch the Chelsea Handler, Ellen DeGeneres and Jimmy Fallon shows, at the time are respective hosts of Chelsea Lately (E!), The Ellen DeGeneres Show, and Late Night (NBC). Both serve as inspiration for the Gimenez show.

Gimenez also said that being a woman in conducting a talk show is a differential:

[...] This type of show is conducted by men and me, being a woman, is a differential.. [...] I decided that I will laugh with me or of me.

— Luciana Gimenez

== History ==
Initially, the program's debut was scheduled for November 20, but it was eventually changed to November 27, a week later.

Ana Hickmann was the guest in the show's debut episode. The visit of Hickmann to the show was for retribution to Gimenez by she have gone to Programa da Tarde, Hickmann's show on Rede Record. In this occasion, Luciana By Night has received an average of 3 points in the ratings, according to the consolidated data of IBOPE.

On April 1, 2015, due to a change in the nightly RedeTV! schedule, the program began to be aired at 10:30 pm.
