= Beugró =

- Also known as: Stand-In
- Genre: Improvisational Comedy
- Written by: Gábor Olivér Búss; Bence Trunkó; Szilárd Móri; László Pintér; Dóra Eszter Sós; László Alpári; Dávid Lendvai
- Directed by: Iván Kapitány; Dániel Erdélyi
- Presented by: Péter Novák
- Starring: Lia Pokorny; Laura Ruttkay; Péter Rudolf; Péter Kálloy Molnár; Győző Szabó; Csaba Debreczeny
- Composer: Gergely Parádi
- Country of origin: Hungary
- Original language: Hungarian
- No. of seasons: 9
- No. of episodes: 107

Production
- Producers: Iván Kapitány; György Tamás; Tamás Szurdi
- Production locations: Centrál Szinház, Budapest
- Cinematography: Frigyes B. Marton
- Editors: Gábor Marinkás; Zoltán Bálint
- Camera setup: Multi-camera
- Running time: Season 1: 30 minutes Season 2-9: 50 minutes
- Production company: Filmservice

Original release
- Network: Season 1: TV2; Season 2-3: m1 (Comedy Central); Season 4-6: Cool TV; Season 7-8: Viasat 3 Season 9: RTL II
- Release: December 31, 2007

Beugró (pronounced [ˈbɛuɡroː], English: Stand-In) is a Hungarian short-form improvisational comedy television program. The show's format is similar to the one of Whose Line Is It Anyway?. It was first aired on December 31, 2007 on TV2, but was not renewed after the first season. The Hungarian public service television (Magyar Televízió) and Comedy Central Hungary took Beugró over after its cancellation, but one year later (in 2009) they passed it to Cool TV. In 2011, Viasat 3 bought the rights to the show but stopped production after only one year. The last episode was aired on January 1, 2012. The show had a spring and a fall season each year. In late 2017, RTL II—one of Cool TV's sister channels—revived the series for a tenth anniversary season.

Each episode of the show consists of four actors (usually Lia Pokorny, Laura Ruttkay, Péter Kálloy Molnár, Győző Szabó, Péter Rudolf and/or Csaba Debreczeny) who play improvisational games. As stage properties, they usually have nothing but four chairs. The types of games remain similar but the situations always change. The show is hosted by Péter Novák and is directed and produced by Iván Kapitány.

== History ==
=== The beginnings: 2007–2009 ===
Beugró was based on the idea of co-producer Tamás Szurdi and went through a long preparatory phase. The games came from exercises played at the Academy of Drama and Film in Budapest and from traditional Hungarian improvisational theatre. After the pilot was accepted the creators watched several international improvisational TV shows (among others the Whose Line Is It Anyway?) to determine the final format of the show. The original four actors were Lia Pokorny, Péter Kálloy Molnár, Győző Szabó and Péter Rudolf.

The first episode was aired on New Year's Eve in 2007 on TV2. Beugró was both critically acclaimed and popular among audiences so it started as a weekly series on March 14, 2008 starting at 11 pm (CET). In the meantime the pilot episode, which was never aired, was uploaded on Videa (a Hungarian video sharing website) between March 13 and April 26 and was later included on the 2008 fall season DVD set. 11 further episodes were aired and a compilation of cut scenes. Though the show managed to rank #1 in 18-49 in its time slot, TV2 announced that it won't renew Beugró for a second season on May 6. An internet petition was started to save the show, after which negotiations begun. It turned out that both Magyar Televízió (Hungarian public service television) and Comedy Central Hungary (which hadn't started broadcasting by that time) were interested in the project.

Beugró continued on m1 (in association with Comedy Central) on Saturdays at 10 pm from September 13. The length of the show was changed from 30 minutes to 50 minutes per episode and it became interactive (viewers were asked to solve funny tasks, videotape it and upload on Videa). Also a completely new set design was introduced which was used with altering colours until it was changed again for season 7. After Comedy Central Hungary started to broadcast (October 1) it aired reruns of the show. After October 31 Beugró moved to Friday 9 pm. In December after a one-week break two more episodes aired at 9:20 pm counting altogether 14 episodes. On New Year's Eve the actors performed in Millenáris, where Dorottya Udvaros stood in for Lia Pokorny during the first act. The performance was connected to a dinner. Comedy Central held two Beugró weekends when in the afternoon they broadcast five-hour-long reruns of the show on January 24–25 and March 21–22, 2009. Season 3 started with the New Year's Eve performance at 10:40 pm on Friday, February 13. After an Easter break the show aired at 8:20 pm until June 5. On May 5, the actors participated on a charity event with the actors from A Társulat (a talent show on m1). Beugró Klub (where fans could play the games from the show) was started in club Take5, in Budapest. On August 1, they had a performance in Coke Club, Siófok.

=== The Cool TV era: 2009–2010 ===
The Beugró crew planned a national tour for September 2009, but it was cancelled because of financial reasons; and season 4 was aired on Cool TV between October 16 and December 18 at 9:15 pm with ten episodes. A board game version of the show was also published, developed by Nóra Fejtő, and followed by a refill pack (Beugró Újratöltve) and a second board game (Beugró 2.). In November 2009 the radio version of the show was started on the newly founded Neo FM titled Beugró+ which ended in December 2010. On December 27, the first Beugró Live Party with Péter Kálloy Molnár and Győző Szabó was organised on Corvintető. Csaba Debreczeny, who substituted Győző Szabó in one episode in season 3, in the New Year's Eve performance (not recorded) on January 6–7, 2010 and in Palace of Arts at a Magyar Telekom event on January 12, was announced as the fifth official Beugró-actor in season 5 and onwards. By this time Beugró had more than 10,000 fans on Facebook, and also had a considerable fan community on the forum of the official site developed by Balázs Naszódi.

Season 5 started on March 19, 2010 and consisted of ten episodes like season 4. On the next day the actors performed in Hunguest Hotel Pelion in Tapolca. Season 1 was published on DVD on March 30. Centrál Színház held two further performances that were not recorded by Cool TV on May 10–11. Season 5 ended on May 21, and was followed by the second Beugró Live Party on the 24th. During the summer of 2010 four channels broadcast the show's reruns: TV2, m2, Comedy Central and Cool TV. On September 25, Beugró got the Kamera Hungária Award for Best Comedy/Musical Series. In the beginning of October Facebook-fans of Beugró counted more than 100,000. Season 6 aired from October 20, to December 22, on Wednesdays at 9:15 pm with ten new episodes. On January 21–23, 2011, the actors performed in Tapolca again (except Győző Szabó).

=== Beugró plusz: 2011–2012 ===
On January 28, it was announced that Beugró would continue with season 7 on Viasat 3, fourth home for the show. Viasat 3's creative director Gábor Kereszty in 2007 as director of TV2 suggested programme director Lóránd Poich to buy Beugró. In 2011 he said the show fitted the target group of Viasat 3. The channel gave the name Beugró plusz (Stand-In Plus) to the new season (so that the audience can easily distinguish old episodes from the new ones). The decision was explained from the creative side with that the format was also somewhat changed. The new season, which started on March 11, 2011 at 9:15 pm, looked for the sixth Beugró-actor with the Beugró-games in a talent show/reality way. The season featured six contestants (young actors and actresses) each of whom had a debut episode. Three of them were promoted to the second round (one episode each). The winner, Laura Ruttkay had a third episode and there were two regular episodes as well. Season 7 ended on May 27. Viewers could vote for the contestants via Facebook, but the winner was chosen by the producers of the show solely. Péter Bozsó got the majority of the votes. In season 7 the set design the opening theme and the opening sequence were all significantly changed.

During the summer break of the show a webseries was being published on the official site and the Facebook profile of the show, titled Beugró TV containing interview extracts and deleted scenes. The second Beugró plusz season used featured topics for each of its twelve episodes that could be voted for via Facebook. Since the set design of the previous season received negative response, it was recoloured (again based on Facebook votes). The first eleven episodes aired at 9:15 pm on Fridays between September 16 and November 25, while the last one at 9:00 pm on January 1, 2012. For this season Laura Ruttkay joined the main cast. A monthly theatrical series started on November 22, 2011 in Győr titled GyőrBe-Ugró based on Beugró. On January 26, Viasat 3 announced that it would not order any further Beugró plusz episodes, but producer Iván Kapitány claimed that the series would continue in some other form. As of spring 2012, Centrál Színház still held Beugró theatre events but these were not recorded for television broadcast.

== Production ==
An unaired pilot episode was recorded on May 7, 2007 in Játékszín, Budapest, though all of seasons 1 through 8 were taped on the small stage of Centrál Színház (Central Theatre). These shootings are usually about three to three and a half hours long. The tickets are sold months before the performance. They are held fortnightly on Mondays and Thuesdays, and the production teem has three or four weeks till airing the finished episode. While shooting, the director instructs the cameramen and the presenter from a production truck. The first season was recorded between October 9, 2007 and April 29, 2008; the second between August 25 and November 18, 2008; the fifth between February, 22 and April 20, 2011; the sixth between September 27 and November 23, 2010; the seventh between February 21 and May 3, 2011; the eighth between September 5 and November 8, 2011.

== Episodes ==
Season	Episodes	Originally released		
Season	Episodes	First released	Last released	Network
Pilot		December 31, 2007		TV2
1	12	March 14, 2008	June 6, 2008	TV2
2	14	September 13, 2008	December 19, 2008	M1
3	16	February 13, 2009	June 5, 2009	M1
4	10	October 16, 2009	December 18, 2009	Cool TV
5	10	March 19, 2010	May 21, 2010	Cool TV
6	10	October 20, 2010	December 22, 2010	Cool TV
7	12	March 11, 2011	May 27, 2011	Viasat 3
8	12	September 16, 2011	January 1, 2012	Viasat 3
Live stream		December 19, 2016		Origo.hu
9	10	October 27, 2017	December 29, 2017	RTL II

== DVD release ==
The first two seasons have been published on DVD so far. Their distributor is Universal Music. First season 2 was released on October 8, 2009 on 4 DVDs, containing all fourteen episodes and cut scenes along with the pilot episode as extra. Season 1 came out next on March 30, 2010 on 3 DVDs with all thirteen episodes and a making-of and cut scenes as extra. They are both region 0, 4:3 PAL with stereo sound.

== Guest performers ==
The show has featured several guest performers. In seasons 1-3, they were mostly well-known actors and actresses and were called simply guest performers. Season 1 and 2 had two each, while season 3 had five, one of them Csaba Debreczeny who became regular from season 5. Season 4 didn't have any guests, while season 5 and 6 had four and five, respectively, called stand-ins or Stand-In. In season 5 they were well-known TV personalities (not actors) while in season 6 young or less-known actors. Season 7 featured six contestants for the sixth Beugró-actor.

== Boardgames ==
The first official board game for the show was published in autumn 2009 by Alter Játék and Keller & Mayer. Developer Nóra Fejtő said she wanted to make a game that doesn't get repeated, can be played by many and few, is simple, doesn't need much preparation and can be played many times. It featured six of the Beugró games, and the developers could use the "screenplays" of the show (so it contains many situations played at the shootings but never making it to air). The game contained 180 situation (30 for each type), a table bell (symbol of the show, used by the presenter) and cards for some of the game types. The game was sold out by December 2009 and was available again from February 2010. In May 2010 a new version was released with new situations: Beugró Újratöltve (Beugró Reloaded), and in September 2010 Beugró 2. which featured six new types of games.
