= The Millers =

American sitcom (2013–2015)

- Genre: Sitcom
- Created by: Greg Garcia
- Directed by: James Burrows (Note: The majority of episodes of the series are directed by Burrows; other than him, Phill Lewis directed "You Are The Wind Beneath My Wings, Man" (season 2, episode 4) and Marc Buckland directed "When the Pope Comes Marching In" (season 2, episode 7).)
- Starring: Will Arnett; Margo Martindale; Beau Bridges; J. B. Smoove; Jayma Mays; Nelson Franklin; Eve Moon; Lulu Wilson; Sean Hayes
- Theme music composer: Jonathan Leahy; Manish Raval; Tom Wolfe
- Composers: Danny Lux; Matt Mariano
- Country of origin: United States
- Original language: English
- No. of seasons: 2
- No. of episodes: 34 (list of episodes)

Production
- Executive producers: Greg Garcia; James Burrows
- Camera setup: Multi-camera
- Running time: 21 minutes
- Production companies: Amigos de Garcia Productions; CBS Television Studios

Original release
- Network: CBS
- Release: October 3, 2013 – July 18, 2015

The Millers is an American sitcom television series that was created by Greg Garcia and stars Will Arnett as Nathan Miller and Margo Martindale as Carol Miller. The multi-camera series aired from October 3, 2013, to July 18, 2015, and ran 34 episodes over two seasons on CBS.

CBS announced the cancellation of The Millers on November 14, 2014, four episodes into the show's second season. The series filmed their final episode on November 17, 2014. Eleven episodes were produced during season 2 before production shut down. The producers decided to finish the episode "Hero", which was underway at the time for the financial sake of the below the line crew members that had already worked on the episode for several days. In an interview in The Hollywood Reporter in April 2015, Margo Martindale stated that the show's cancellation was unexpected.

== Premise ==
The Millers is set in Leesburg, Virginia where Nathan Miller is a local television news reporter. His sister Debbie runs a combination yoga studio/vegan restaurant with her husband Adam, with whom she has a daughter named Mikayla. Nathan does not have any children and often hangs out with Ray, his friend who also serves as a cameraman for the television station at which Nathan works. As the series begins, Nathan and Debbie's bickering parents, Tom and Carol Miller, are returning from Myrtle Beach. Nathan informs them he divorced his wife, Janice, several months ago. Tom responds by deciding to leave Carol, ending their 43-year marriage. Tom moves in with Debbie and Adam while Carol moves in with Nathan, each driving their children crazy.

== Cast and characters ==
=== Main cast ===
- Will Arnett as Nathan Miller
- Margo Martindale as Carol Miller
- Beau Bridges as Tom Miller
- Jayma Mays as Debbie Stoker
- Nelson Franklin as Adam Stoker
- J. B. Smoove as Ray
- Lulu Wilson (guest star, episodes 12–13; series regular, episodes 14–34) and Eve Moon (episodes 1–9) as Mikayla Stoker
- Sean Hayes as Kip Finkle (season 2)

=== Recurring cast ===
- Eliza Coupe as Janice, Nathan's ex-wife
- Lou Wagner as Mr. Booms, Nathan's immediate supervisor at the TV station
- Garrett Ryan as Young Nathan (in flashbacks)

== Series overview ==
Season	Episodes	Originally released	
Season	Episodes	First released	Last released
1	23	October 3, 2013	May 15, 2014
2	11	October 20, 2014	July 18, 2015

== Development and production ==
On January 18, 2013, CBS placed a pilot order, under the title Unauthorized Greg Garcia Pilot. The pilot was written by Greg Garcia and directed by James Burrows.

Casting announcements began in February 2013, with Will Arnett first cast in the lead role of Nathan Miller, a recently divorced man whose life is complicated when his parents decide to move in with him. Arnett originally booked the role in second position to Up All Night, whose future was uncertain at the time. Margo Martindale was the next actor cast, in the series regular role of Carol Miller, Nathan's vibrant but meddlesome mother. J. B. Smoove then joined the series as Ray, Nathan's good friend and cameraman. Shortly after, Mary Elizabeth Ellis signed onto the role of Debbie, Nathan's happily married sister. In early March, Beau Bridges joined the series as Tom Miller, Nathan's father, who moves in with Debbie. Michael Rapaport was the last actor to sign onto the series, in the role of Adam, Debbie's husband.

On May 10, 2013, CBS placed a series order, under the new title The Millers. Shortly after the series order, Mary Elizabeth Ellis and Michael Rapaport exited the roles of Debbie and Adam. A couple months later, Jayma Mays and Nelson Franklin were cast in the two vacated roles.

On March 13, 2014, CBS announced the second season renewal of The Millers. For the second season, Sean Hayes signed on for the series regular role of Kip Finkle, Carol's new best friend.

On November 15, 2014, CBS canceled The Millers after citing "underwhelming" ratings in its new Monday berth, most recently pulling in a 1.5 rating in adults 18–49. Production was to be halted after taping of the second season's 11th episode on November 17, 2014.

== Reception ==
Leanne Aguilera and Jenna Mullins of E! Online said the "wonderful cast" gives them a sliver of hope. Diane Werts of Newsday gave the show an A−. David Hinckley of The New York Daily News gave the show 1 star out of 5. It currently holds a 49% approval rating on Rotten Tomatoes and a 50% approval rating on Metacritic, both signifying mixed reviews.

=== Ratings ===
Season	Timeslot (ET)	Episodes	Premiered		Ended		TV Season	Rank	Viewers (in millions)
Season	Timeslot (ET)	Episodes	Date	Premiere Viewers (in millions)	Date	Finale Viewers (in millions)	TV Season	Rank	Viewers (in millions)
1	Thursday 8:30 pm	23	October 3, 2013	13.09	May 15, 2014	9.78	2013–14	#24	11.37
2	Monday 8:30 pm Saturday 8:00 pm Saturday 8:30 pm	11	October 20, 2014	8.93	July 18, 2015	2.11	2014–15	N/A	N/A

== International broadcasts ==
- In Canada, CTV aired season 2. Season 1 aired on Global
- Comedy Central UK announced that they would be airing the series starting on October 14, 2013.
- In South Africa, DStv aired The Millers on the M-Net channel.
- In Australia, Ten originally aired the series before moving it to One.
- In New Zealand, Prime began airing on Sundays 9:30PM from December 1, 2013.
- In Latin America the show airs on Canal TBS
- In Poland, Universal Channel aired The Millers from March 19, 2014.
- In Germany, ProSieben airs The Millers.
- In Hungary, Comedy Central Hungary started airing The Millers.
- In Russia, Amedia Premium started airing the show one day after its U.S. premiere.
- In Asia, the series aired on RTL CBS Entertainment.
- In India, Zee Café airs The Millers
- In Philippines, 2nd Avenue starting airing October 25, 2014, Saturday 7:30 pm.

== Home media ==
Season 1 was released on DVD in Region 1 on August 19, 2014

Season 1
Set Details	Special Features
23 Episodes; 3 Disc Set; 16:9 Aspect Ratio; Languages: English Audio; English, Portuguese, Spanish Subtitles	Launch Promos; Season In Review: Year One; J.B. Smoove Walks The Streets; The Actor's Actor: William Arnett; Gag Reel; Audio Commentary
