= List of The Millers episodes =

The Millers is an American sitcom that was created by Greg Garcia. The multi-camera series premiered on CBS as part of the 2013–14 American television season and aired from October 3, 2013, to July 18, 2015. The Millers is set in Leesburg, Virginia, where Nathan Miller is a local television news reporter. His sister Debbie runs a combination yoga studio/vegan restaurant with her husband Adam, with whom she has a daughter named Mikayla. Nathan does not have any children and often hangs out with Ray, his friend who also serves as a cameraman for the fictional television station at which Nathan works. As the series begins, Nathan and Debbie's bickering parents, Tom and Carol Miller, are returning from Myrtle Beach. Nathan informs them he divorced his wife, Janice, several months ago. Tom responds by deciding to leave Carol after being married for forty-three years. Tom moves in with Debbie and Adam while Carol moves in with Nathan, each driving their children crazy. On March 13, 2014, The Millers was renewed for a second season, which premiered on October 20, 2014.

After the series cancellation by CBS was announced on November 14, 2014, CBS broadcast the episode titled "CON-Troversy" on November 17, 2014, instead of the originally scheduled episode "Diggin' Up Bones". The episode "CON-Troversy" ended with a parting phrase, "I'll be back Monday. Which Monday? I don't know." Some season two episodes aired outside the United States months prior to their eventual burn-off broadcasts by CBS on Saturday nights in July 2015. On November 27, 2014, CTV in Canada premiered an original episode not previously broadcast by CBS, titled "Papa Was a Rolling Bone." On January 14, 2015, M-Net in South Africa premiered another original episode never broadcast prior, titled "Highway to the Manger Zone". M-Net continued to premiere all the remaining episodes each week until the series finale aired on February 11, 2015.

The series ran from October 3, 2013, to July 18, 2015, on CBS and aired 34 original episodes over two seasons.

== Series overview ==
Season	Episodes	Originally released	
Season	Episodes	First released	Last released
1	23	October 3, 2013	May 15, 2014
2	11	October 20, 2014	July 18, 2015

== Episodes ==
=== Season 1 (2013–14) ===
No. overall	No. in season	Title	Directed by	Written by	Original release date	Prod. code	U.S. viewers (millions)
1	1	"Pilot"	James Burrows	Greg Garcia	October 3, 2013	MLR101	13.09
Siblings Nathan and Debbie are upset when their parents announce they're divorcing after 43 years of marriage. But there's more: their intrusive mother Carol announces that she's moving in with Nathan, while their easily-distracted father Tom is moving in with Debbie.
2	2	"Plot Twists"	James Burrows	Danielle Sanchez-Witzel	October 10, 2013	MLR104	11.73
Due to her and Nathan's divorces, Carol calls a meeting to discuss rearranging the family's cemetery plots she had pre-purchased. This forces a reluctant Nathan to contact his ex, Janice (Eliza Coupe).
3	3	"The Phone Upgrade"	James Burrows	Bobby Bowman	October 17, 2013	MLR103	12.27
Fed up with Tom's forgetfulness, Debbie complains to Nathan, who then helps his father by giving him a modern smartphone and programming in audio reminders. Nathan brags that he's "fixed" Tom, but soon realizes that Dad is still Dad.
4	4	"The Mother is In"	James Burrows	Austen Earl	October 24, 2013	MLR105	10.74
After Carol learns that Nathan has been going to therapy, she books an appointment with the same psychologist so that she can sneak a peek at what Nathan has been saying about her.
5	5	"Giving the Bird"	James Burrows	Gina Gari	October 31, 2013	MLR106	9.67
On Halloween, Nathan, Debbie, and Adam take Mikayla trick-or-treating to the house of an old woman (Beth Grant) suspected by the neighborhood of being a witch. Nathan and Debbie also find out that Carol lied about what really happened to their pet parrot when they were kids.
6	6	"Stuff"	James Burrows	Stephnie Weir	November 7, 2013	MLR102	10.38
Nathan and Debbie encourage Carol and Tom to go through their still-unpacked boxes after discovering many family momentos in them, hoping that their parents will feel nostalgic and get back together.
7	7	"The Talk"	James Burrows	Stephnie Weir	November 14, 2013	MLR110	11.08
When Nathan brings home his first date (Casey Wilson) since his mother became his roommate, Carol realizes that Tom never had "the talk" with Nathan about the birds and the bees, and insists it's not too late to gather the family for a belated discussion.
8	8	"Internet Dating"	James Burrows	Chadd Gindin	November 21, 2013	MLR108	11.78
Nathan and Ray set up a profile for Carol on an internet dating site. They become so enamored with one of her potential suitors (Fred Dryer), they start conversing with him directly, pretending to be Carol.
9	9	"You're in Trouble"	James Burrows	Elizabeth Tippet	December 5, 2013	MLR109	9.23
When Nathan learns why Debbie is Tom's favorite, he decides to reveal some of Debbie's childhood secrets to their parents – but Debbie turns the tables.
10	10	"Carol's Parents Are Coming to Town"	James Burrows	Bobby Bowman	December 12, 2013	MLR111	10.93
Carol's parents decide to visit for Christmas, so the family must pretend that Carol and Tom are still married, as are Nathan and Janice; also, Carol and Tom are living with Debbie because Adam is in rehab. When the lies get out of control, Carol's dad (Jerry Van Dyke) has a shock for his wife (June Squibb). Meanwhile, Ray warns Nathan that Janice might be "Christmas horny."
11	11	"Dear Diary"	James Burrows	Austen Earl	January 2, 2014	MLR112	11.33
After becoming suspicious that Carol and Nathan are reading her diary, Debbie (with help from Adam) plants a fake entry in it to catch them in the act.
12	12	"Miller's Mind"	James Burrows	Chadd Gindin	January 9, 2014	MLR113	13.39
Nathan shares one of Carol's rants with co-workers as a joke, but his boss decides he wants to put the rant on the air. It is so well-received, the station makes it a regular feature, forcing Nathan to try to keep Carol riled up for new material. Meanwhile, Adam is afraid to accompany Mikayla at her school's father-daughter dance.
13	13	"Driving Miss Crazy"	James Burrows	Stephnie Weir	January 30, 2014	MLR107	11.50
Nathan tells Carol he's tired of constantly having to drive her around town, forcing her to ask Adam. When she and Adam begin to bond, however, Nathan gets jealous.
14	14	"Carol's Surprise"	James Burrows	Elizabeth Tippet	February 6, 2014	MLR114	10.69
After the gang discusses how Carol always figures out their surprise party plans, they agree to "no surprises" for her upcoming birthday. Nathan then gets Debbie, Adam, Tom and Ray all involved in an elaborate, complex surprise scenario, but it's just a ruse for the "real" surprise because he knows they will all leak information to Carol.
15	15	"You Betcha"	James Burrows	Guy Endore-Kaiser	February 27, 2014	MLR115	11.10
Nathan wants to spend more time with Tom, but the two soon realize they have little in common. Ray reveals he has a sports gambling problem, only after suckering Nathan and Tom into giving him money for his bet on an international soccer match. Elsewhere, while babysitting Mikayla, Carol accidentally serves her the wrong lasagna – one with meat in it. When Mikayla falls in love with the taste, the two try to keep the secret from Mikayla's vegan parents.
16	16	"Bahama Mama"	James Burrows	Bob Daily	March 6, 2014	MLR116	11.58
Nathan and Ray have a trip to the tropics planned, but Ray gets a foot injury, leaving a reluctant Nathan to vacation alone, or so Nathan thinks. Debbie gets upset that Adam hasn't ever written her a love song, after seeing a videotape of a teenaged Adam singing a love song to a different girl.
17	17	"Plus One"	James Burrows	Chadd Gindin	March 13, 2014	MLR117	10.52
Nathan has two tickets to a charity dinner where President Obama is speaking, and has a hard time deciding which family member to take, knowing the three left out will be angry. Ray has already declined because he once beat up "Barry" Obama after a pickup basketball game when he lived in Chicago.
18	18	"Walk-n-Wave"	James Burrows	Gina Gari	April 3, 2014	MLR118	11.35
After Nathan wonders aloud why he wasn't invited to a station employee's wedding, Ray says it's because he always does a "walk-n-wave" rather than talking to the co-worker, which makes it appear that Nathan is putting himself above that person. Nathan then tries to chat up a strange co-worker (Andy Richter), but ends up getting too involved in the guy's life. Meanwhile, Adam and Tom each take an online IQ test to determine who is smarter.
19	19	"Cancellation Fee"	James Burrows	Stephnie Weir	April 10, 2014	MLR119	10.07
Carol forgets a dentist appointment and fakes an injury to explain her tardiness when she finally arrives, but the receptionist hits her with a cancellation fee anyway. When the dentist, Dr. Sonya Vega, later has to postpone Carol's appointment, Carol demands her fee back. After the receptionist won't comply, Carol puts Dr. Vega on her growing boycott list. The only problem is that Nathan has made a date with Sonya.
20	20	"Tomlandia"	James Burrows	Austen Earl	April 24, 2014	MLR120	9.96
Mikayla convinces Tom to tell his comic book-style story to his family, in which he is a superhero. Ray and Nathan pitch the idea to the station owner as a children's program featuring puppets of Tom's characters, but Nathan is less than thrilled when the owner wants him to play the "farmer" that will host the show. At the filming for the pilot episode, Tom explodes over major changes made to his precious characters.
21	21	"0072"	James Burrows	Chadd Gindin	May 1, 2014	MLR121	9.43
Tom announces that he wants to start dating again, and his family begins to seek out women they think might be his speed. On his own, however, Tom lands a considerably younger book store employee. Convinced the woman is a golddigger, Nathan investigates, only to discover that Tom has won over the woman with a mysterious cover identity.
22	22	"Sex Ed Dolan"	James Burrows	Bobby Bowman	May 8, 2014	MLR122	8.96
To get out of a night "tomcatting" with his boss, Ed (Jeffrey Tambor), Nathan has Tom turn on the charm and share some common interests. But that only leads to Ed sleeping with Carol. After one night, Ed becomes clingy and Carol tries to figure out a way to leave him without hurting Nathan's standing at work. Carol's family is more than ready to provide suggestions to make Ed leave her, which mostly involve Carol being herself.
23	23	"Mother's Day"	James Burrows	Story by : Max Reisman; Teleplay by : Sara Huffman and Joe Ahern	May 15, 2014	MLR123	9.78
Carol makes a big deal about how Debbie forgot one Mother's Day in the past and how Nathan never forgets. But when flowers show up at Nathan's home addressed to his ex-mother in law, Nathan reveals he simply has a standing order with two florists for Mother's Day, and that Carol's flowers likely have been delivered to her and Tom's old home in Myrtle Beach. Upset, Carol has her Mother's Day brunch alone, getting drunk on mimosas and then trying to guilt her family into joining her.

=== Season 2 (2014–15) ===
No. overall	No. in season	Title	Directed by	Written by	Original release date	Prod. code	U.S. viewers (millions)
24	1	"Movin' Out (Carol's Song)"	James Burrows	Chadd Gindin	October 20, 2014	MLR201	8.93
Carol begins her search for a new apartment, causing Nathan and Debbie to race each other to find her a place that is the farthest away from each of them. During the course of her house-hunting, Carol meets and develops an instant bond with Kip (Sean Hayes), her new best friend who works in admissions at a retirement community.
25	2	"Reunited and It Feels So Bad"	James Burrows	Stephnie Weir	October 27, 2014	MLR203	6.94
It's finally time for Carol and Tom to sign their divorce papers, but Carol has issue with the "no fault" language. So the two decide to stay married, and discover that some bad habits of each have disappeared during their time with the children. After announcing that they are staying together, Nathan and Debbie aren't convinced it will last. So they have Kip host a "Rawly-wed Game" in which Carol and Tom compete against the teams of Debbie-Adam and Nathan-Ray.
26	3	"Give Metta World Peace a Chance"	James Burrows	Mark Stegemann	November 3, 2014	MLR204	6.78
Nathan lands the biggest interview of his career, with professional basketball player (Metta World Peace) who has written a children's book. But an incident at a gas station on the way leads to an embarrassing interview that threatens to ruin his career. Also, Debbie has been faking an illness to secretly attend a substitute teaching job, because she's afraid to tell Adam that she's given up on the vegan cafe making any money.
27	4	"You Are the Wind Beneath My Wings, Man"	Phill Lewis	Chris Harris	November 10, 2014	MLR206	6.48
Ray points out that Nathan is the worst wingman ever, because he always turns the attention to himself. Nathan worries that he is a narcissist, so Kip offers to help teach him how to be less self-involved. Also, Adam proposes to turn the restaurant into a food truck business, but Debbie goes behind his back again to interview for a job at a rental car company.
28	5	"CON-Troversy"	James Burrows	Guy Endore-Kaiser	November 17, 2014	MLR202	6.31
Nathan is assigned to cover a Sci-Fi Fest for his workplace and runs into a famous book author who has hated him since grade school. Meanwhile, Adam has an identity crisis when he learns that much of what he was taught by his commune leader (Ed Begley, Jr.) was based on the mythology of Star Wars.
29	6	"Diggin' Up Bones"	James Burrows	Austen Earl	July 4, 2015	MLR205	1.68
Kip motivates Carol to face her arch enemy, Miss Pam (Molly Shannon), during Pam's retirement party from teaching at Central Elementary School. As Pam reads aloud some praiseworthy letters from former students who admired her, Nathan proposes they dig up the time capsule that Carol's students buried many years ago, hoping to find something that will make Carol feel better.
30	7	"When the Pope Comes Marching In"	Marc Buckland	Elizabeth Tippet	July 4, 2015	MLR207	1.47
Nathan plans a series of special reports on the Pope's visit to town, while Ray is lured to work for rival reporter Chuck Manners. When Kip learns Tom is an old friend of the Pope, he begs Tom to get him close enough that the Pope can cure his Carpal tunnel syndrome. Meanwhile, it takes a miracle for Debbie and Adam to sell their homemade souvenirs along the parade route.
31	8	"Papa Was a Rolling Bone"	James Burrows	Stephnie Weir	July 11, 2015	MLR208	1.82
Following an argument, the Millers intend to celebrate Thanksgiving apart. Nathan plans to spend time with his girlfriend Kate (Jama Williamson), Tom and Ray hang out together, Carol and Kip host a guest at home but get on each other's nerves, while Debbie, Adam and Mikayla end up at a Native American casino where Debbie starts gambling. But all these plans are soon dashed, and they end up together by dinner time.
32	9	"Louise Louise"	James Burrows	Bobby Bowman	July 11, 2015	MLR209	1.76
Carol's Aunt Louise (Cloris Leachman) comes to town to attend a funeral. Aunt Louise has one wish before her own funeral though, so The Millers pull out all the stops to give her the chance to sing the national anthem at a Leesburg Titans hockey game. Note: This episode was originally titled "Stan by Me."
33	10	"Highway to the Manger Zone"	James Burrows	Chadd Gindin & Austen Earl & Elizabeth Tippet	July 18, 2015	MLR210	1.87
The Millers are selected to play the living Nativity scene for the Christmas fundraiser at their church, but they are replaced at the last minute by a rival family named the Muellers, angering Carol. So Kip convinces the Millers to create a competing Nativity scene. Nathan and Kip are vying for Carol's attention and get into a very public fight over playing the baby Jesus in the manger scene. Meanwhile, Tom spends the entire holiday season reading 15,000 emails in his inbox after someone calls him a "yahoo" and he finally remembers his old Yahoo email password is "shutupstupid."
34	11	"Hero"	James Burrows	Tim Stack	July 18, 2015	MLR211	1.96
Nathan tries to impress a teacher, Miss Sparks (Kathleen Rose Perkins), during an admissions interview to get his niece Mikayla into a new age school. Phil LaMarr also guest stars as Principal Walters. Meanwhile, Kip is having trouble falling asleep without the aid of sleeping pills, so Carol and Tom try to help.
