= Canada After Dark =

1978–79 talk show

Canada After Dark is Canada's first late-night comedy/variety talk show. It was hosted by Paul Soles and aired on CBC Television from September 18, 1978, to January 26, 1979.

The show was repackaged from the more informational 90 Minutes Live. Executive producer Alex Frame and producer Bob Ennis decided to try a show that would be comparable to The Tonight Show instead, changing the name of the show to Canada After Dark and replacing host Peter Gzowski with comedic actor Soles. The new show would last for less than half a season.

The Royal Canadian Air Farce parodied the show with skits called "Clark In The Dark", featuring then-Prime Minister Joe Clark (played by Don Ferguson) acting as "host" from the gallery of an empty House Of Commons. The skits were revived after Clark returned to politics in the late 1990s.
