= The Joey Bishop Show =

The Joey Bishop Show is the title of the following shows which starred American comic actor Joey Bishop:

- The Joey Bishop Show (TV series), an American situation comedy television series, broadcast by NBC (1961–1964) and CBS (1964–1965)
- The Joey Bishop Show (talk show), an American television talk show program, presented on ABC's nighttime schedule (11:30pm–1am) from April 1967 to December 1969
