= The Edge with Jake Sasseville =

The Edge with Jake Sasseville is an American late-night television talk show created and hosted by Jake Sasseville. The series combined celebrity interviews, unscripted comedy, and behind-the-scenes footage. The program was produced by Sasseville's production company, Foot in Mouth, Inc., and was based in New York, New York. It began on Public-access television in Auburn, Maine in 2001, aired briefly on Fox affiliates in Maine in 2004, and its first 13-episode national season began airing on at least 37 ABC affiliates on February 14, 2008. The show stopped airing in 2010 and Sasseville now hosts Late Night Republic. When it ran, in most markets, the program aired at 1:05 a.m. on Friday mornings following Jimmy Kimmel Live! The program has followed an unusual path of obtaining nationwide exposure by purchasing blocks of airtime in local markets and selling advertising itself. Initial nationwide sponsors included the Ford Motor Company, Overstock.com, and Red Bull.

== Other media ==
=== Marketing ===
In an attempt to convince ABC affiliates to adopt the program, Sasseville began a campaign titled "Jake After Jimmy" during the 2007 Crocs Next Step Campus Tour featuring the band Guster. Sasseville emceed the tour and encouraged crowd members to send messages to ABC affiliate managers by logging onto his Web site, JakeAfterJimmy.com. Author Brandon Mendelson is quoted in the press as being a co-creator and in charge of the online efforts behind the Jake After Jimmy campaign.
