= Luciana Gimenez =

Brazilian TV host

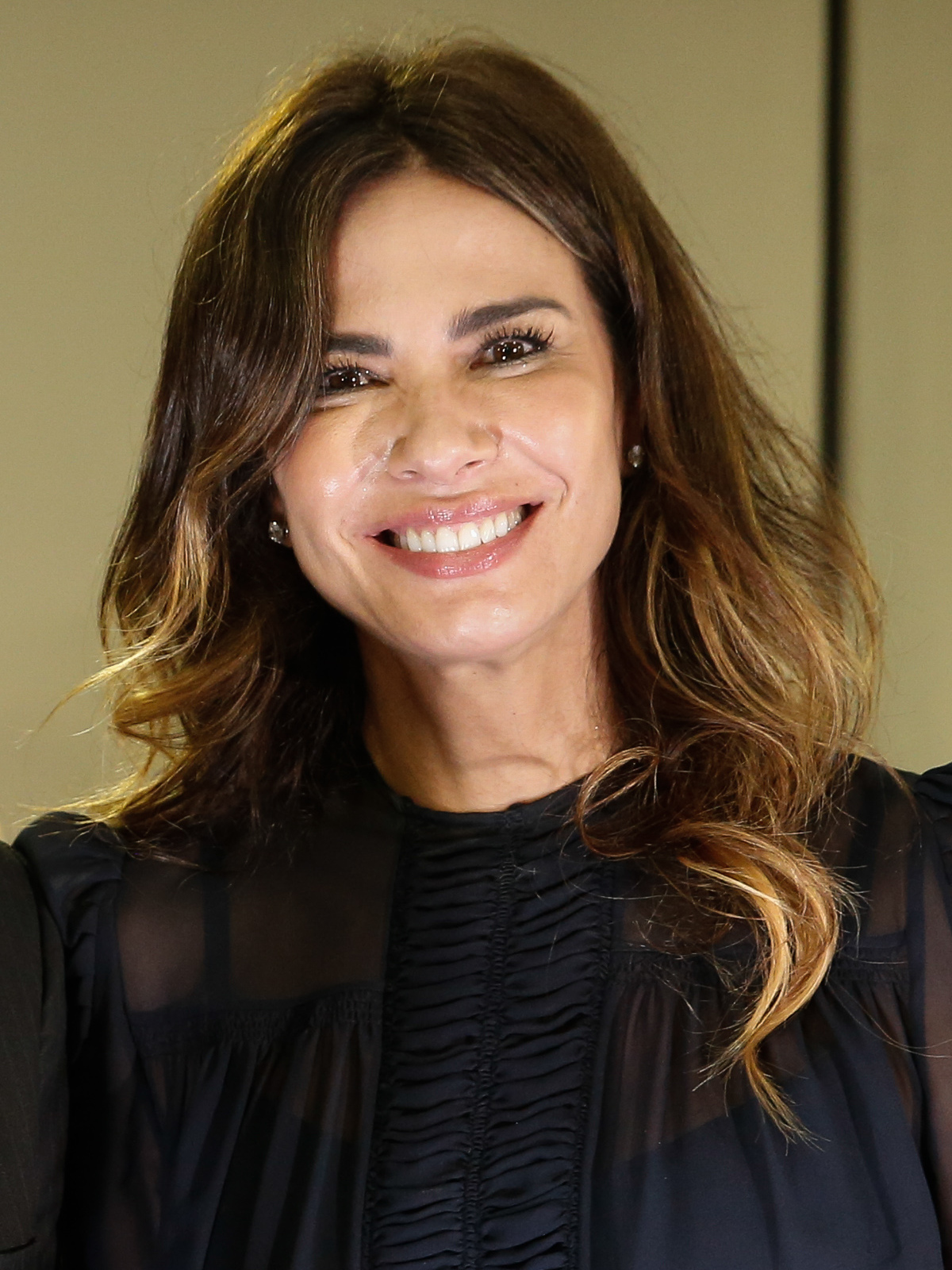
- Gimenez in 2015
- Born: Luciana Gimenez Morad; November 3, 1969 (age 56); São Paulo, Brazil
- Occupation: TV host
- Height: 1.81 m (5 ft 11 in)
- Spouse: Marcelo de Carvalho (m. 2006; div. 2018)
- Children: Lucas Maurice Morad-Jagger (eldest son); Lorenzo Gabriel (youngest son)
- Parent(s): João Alberto Morad (father); Vera Gimenez (mother)
- Relatives: Marco Antônio Gimenez (younger half-brother)
- Website: lucianagimenez.com.br

Luciana Gimenez Morad (born November 3, 1969) is a Brazilian television host, businesswoman and model. In Brazil, she hosts the TV show Superpop.

Outside of Brazil, she is best known for getting pregnant with Mick Jagger's child while he was unofficially married to supermodel Jerry Hall. DNA tests confirmed Lucas Maurice Morad Jagger was Jagger's son.

== Early life ==
Gimenez was born in São Paulo, daughter of businessman João Alberto Morad and actress Vera Gimenez. She is also the half sister of actor Marco Antonio Gimenez. Luciana spent part of her childhood at her maternal grandmother's house in São Paulo because of her parents' divorce proceedings. After the death of her grandmother, she moved to Rio de Janeiro, where she moved in with her mother and stepfather, actor Jece Valadão.

== Career ==
Gimenez started her modeling career at age 13. She was then recruited at 16 by John Casablancas, founder of Elite Model Management and began modeling in many cities around the world, such as Paris, Hamburg, Milan, and New York.

In 2001, Gimenez became a TV hostess on Brazil's RedeTV!, and her show is the primetime show Superpop. She has already been endorsed by brands such as: Chanel, Osklen, Marks & Spencer, Azzedine Alaïa.

After research done by ABC, Luciana was invited to participate in the program The View on June 10, 2013. One of the main issues addressed by the program was the campaign against the prevention of communicable disease by prostitutes.

== Personal life ==
Her son with musician Mick Jagger, Lucas Maurice Morad Jagger, also known as Lucas Jagger, was born on May 18, 1999 in New York City, United States.

She was married to Marcelo de Carvalho, who owns RedeTV!, from 2006 to 2018. Gimenez and Carvalho have one son, born on February 24, 2011, also born in New York.

In a 2023 videocast to Universa, Luciana came out as demisexual.

== Filmography ==
=== Television ===
Year	Program	Channel
2001–2026	Superpop	RedeTV!
2010	Mega Senha	RedeTV!
2012–2021	Luciana by Night	RedeTV!
2013	The View	ABC

=== Film ===
Year	Film	Role
2001	Xuxa e os Duendes	Fada Morgana
2010	O Filme dos Espíritos	Roseli
