= Jake Sasseville =

American media entrepreneur

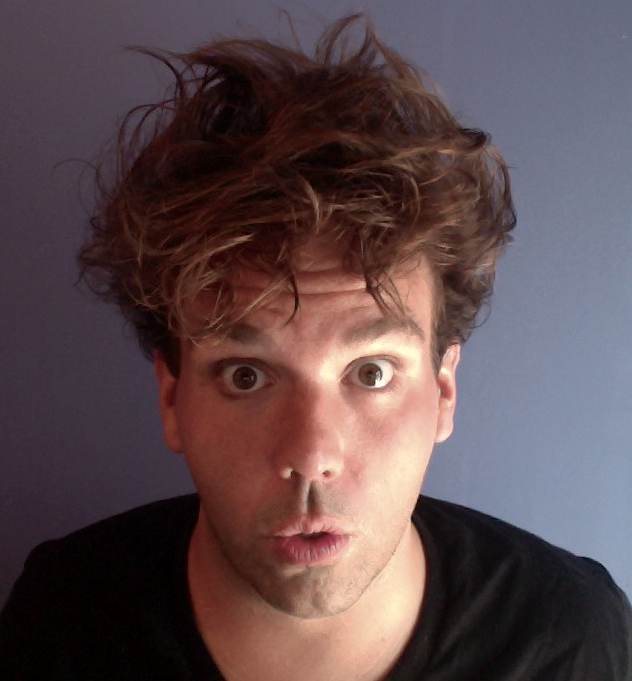
- Born: November 30, 1985 (age 40); Lewiston, Maine, United States
- Notable work: The Jake Sasseville Show; Delusions of Grandeur; The Edge with Jake Sasseville; Late Night Republic

Comedy career
- Years active: 2000 - present
- Subjects: Entrepreneurship, Entertainment, Journalism
- Occupations: Talk show host, Journalist, Entrepreneur
- Website: Official website

Jake Sasseville (born November 30, 1985) is the CEO and Co-Founder of Imiloa Institute.

He is also a television personality who hosted, produced and created talk shows and variety shows from 2007-2015, such as The Edge with Jake Sasseville and Late Night Republic with Jake Sasseville, on various ABC, The CW, and FOX television affiliates.

Since 2014, he has hosted the award winning The Jake Sasseville Show, a podcast having an audience of one million listeners and called "the intersection of Culture and Consciousness" by the Huffington Post.

== Early life ==
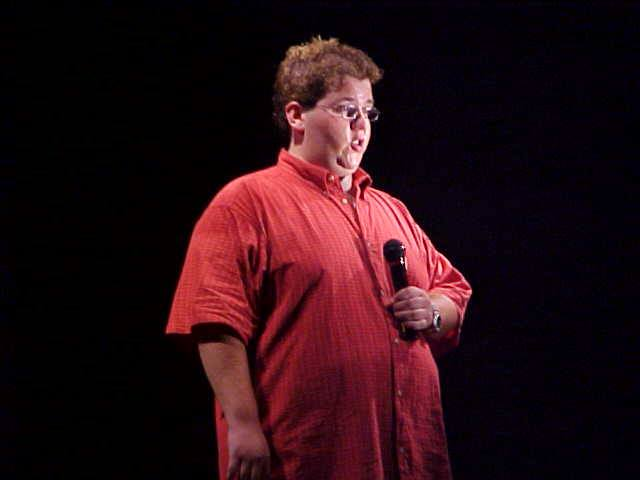
Sasseville on tour in 2003

Sasseville was born in Lewiston, Maine and grew up in Auburn, Maine, one of two principal cities of and included in the Lewiston-Auburn, Maine metropolitan statistical area.

At age 13, Sasseville took up magic, taking lessons weekly with local Maine magician Bob Nixon. He began performing card magic and stage magic a few months later. Television shows passed on the young Sasseville as guest; despite that, at age 14, he was one of the youngest people to join the Society of American Magicians. Sasseville attended Edward Little High School in Auburn, and continued performing magic throughout high school to fund his own local access television show.

While in high school, Sasseville left the US when he was 15 to study abroad in France. After graduating, Sasseville enrolled in the New York Institute of Technology. He then transferred from the Institute to Marymount Manhattan College in New York City for two and a half years. He dropped out of college to pursue his career full time, becoming the youngest host in recorded late night TV history after Jimmy Kimmel at age 22.

== Career ==
=== Television talk shows ===
Sasseville's television talk career primarily focused on a reality-talk formula, such as seen on the news/talk program "The Edge". In 2008, Sasseville began hosting The Edge with Jake Sasseville which ran from 2008–2010. In 2008, Sasseville launched the crowd sourced-funded late night talk show Late Night Republic on The CW and FOX television. That same year, the New York Observer's Spencer Morgan called Sasseville "a most un-PC talk show host".

In 2012, Sasseville created the ABC Family show, "Delusions of Grandeur", which had elements of reality television and sitcom television combined. While performing as the show's host, Sasseville also was the executive producer of Late Night Republic on CW and Fox which ran from 2010–2012. In 2012, Sasseville was named by the White House as one of the top entrepreneurs in America.

As part of his different talk shows, Sasseville conducted off-beat interviews—including a variety of locations and odd pairings. Guests have included actor Rainn Wilson of The Office, musician and activist Wyclef Jean, the President of Zambia, Kenneth Kaunda, Al Capone's grandson Chris, and Congressman Dennis Kucinich.

=== Music Tours ===
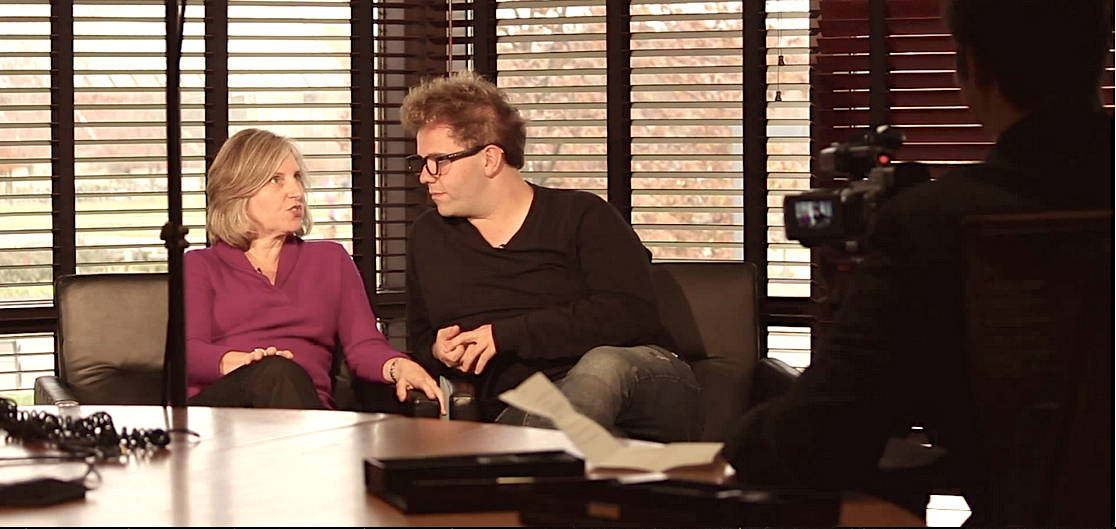
Sasseville and INC Magazine Editor Donna Fenn backstage at the David Letterman Lecture Series in 2012

Sasseville has conducted a number of speaking tours. From 2010-2011, he was the executive producer, emcee and co-owner of several music tours, featuring Kanye West, OneRepublic, Guster, J. Cole Fabolous and Brett Dennen. In 2010 and 2011, impressed by the power of education and inspired by his travels to several African countries, Sasseville launched The Pringles Xtreme Campus Tour, a charity program to build one school in Laos and Thailand for every school the music tour stopped at in the United States. To promote his new TV show on Fox "Late Night Republic", he also embarked on a 40-city road tour, speaking at universities among other events.

=== The Jake Sasseville Show ===
On September 16, 2014, Sasseville launched "The Jake Sasseville Show", a podcast, and the show quickly built an audience of one million listeners thanks in part to initial guests like Yvette Noel-Schure (Beyonce's publicist), presidents of Fortune 500 companies and NBA teams, professional sports athletes, Grammy winning musicians and best-selling authors. In order to launch the show successfully, Sasseville called on his wide circle of friends as initial guests. In 2015, in a story recapping Sasseville's interview with Garrett Madison, Mount Everest climber and survivor of the 2015 Nepal earthquake, the Huffington Post wrote of the show: "The Jake Sasseville Show is at the intersection of culture and consciousness".

=== Marketing and Promotion ===
To promote his shows, Sasseville has used a variety of tactics. When the restaurant chain Wendy's refused to take his call to advertise with him, Sasseville showed up at the flagship store beside the corporate headquarters in Columbus, Ohio, inviting every woman named Wendy in the state of Ohio to have lunch with him at Wendy's. On another occasion, Sasseville broke the world record for largest drum ensemble on Pringles Xtreme cans to win the affinity of the brand. He is also the author of Slightly Famous, an autobiography that describes his rise, fall and rebound to "slight" fame.

=== "Dark Night of the Soul", Maui and Creating Imiloa Institute ===
In 2012, Hurricane Sandy washed away Jake's home on Broad Channel, NYC. His life upended, losing his TV contracts and being forced to move into his grandmother's basement, in Lewiston, Maine. Her basement, by those who follow him, has become synonymous with a "Dark Night of the Soul." He lived there for two years, searching for what he would do next. After moving to Maui from his grandmother's basement and becoming friends with Ram Dass and Shep Gordon, Sasseville became interested in the world of transformation as he saw the trend of health and wellness. He also was hosting people in his 2,500 square foot home and cottage in Kula, Hawaii. He created Imiloa in response to the trend toward health and wellness but also recognizing that human beings want to feel at home in their transformation.

It is well known that Jake approached his soon-to-be-business partner Nadav Wilf four times with the idea of Imiloa before Wilf got inspired by the idea. The pair in 2017 notoriously raised $3.5 million in five Facebook posts, making a dent in the social impact world of investing by gathering 38 investors from 19 countries for Imiloa's formation.

=== Imiloa Institute in Costa Rica ===
The first of 7 planned inter-continental institutes is in the mountains near Dominical in Costa Rica. According to its website, Imiloa is a home and an experience where human beings are invited to awaken their consciousness. Imiloa hosts a variety of retreats and says they handle everything from ticketing to touchdown, transformation to take off, from the United Nations to yoga trainings, medical intuitive retreats to research and development retreats, art therapy retreats and more.
