= Comedy Central (Hungary) =

Comedy Central Hungary
- Final logo, used from 2019 to 2025
- Country: Hungary
- Broadcast area: Hungary

Programming
- Languages: Hungarian; English
- Picture format: 576i (SDTV); 1080i (HDTV)
- Timeshift service: Comedy Central +1

Ownership
- Owner: Paramount Networks EMEAA
- Sister channels: MTV, VH1, Nickelodeon, Nick Jr., Comedy Central Family, Nicktoons, Paramount Network, TeenNick

History
- Launched: October 1, 2008
- Closed: December 31, 2025

Links
- Website: Comedy Central Hungary

Comedy Central Hungary was the Hungarian version of Comedy Central. The channel broadcast comedy oriented shows.

== History ==
The Hungarian broadcast version started on October 1, 2008. The broadcast was initially timesharing with VH1 (which aired between 2:00 AM and 2:00 PM). Based on the viewership data of the first two months of 2009, the channel achieved an average audience share of approximately 0.4% in prime time viewing in the 18-49 age group. From May 1, 2009, the channel began to broadcast 24 hours a day and also VH1 also returned broadcasting 24 hours a day.

Between October 3, 2017, and July 6, 2024, a companion channel named Comedy Central Family was available which broadcast shows more aimed at a family audience such as The King of Queens, Young Sheldon and Friends as well as some animated shows from Nickelodeon like Spongebob Squarepants and The Penguins of Madagascar.

On July 13, 2025, it was reported that Comedy Central, along with nine other Paramount TV channels will cease broadcasting in Hungary on December 31, 2025, according to a spokesperson for Orange Polska.

The channel officially shut down on December 31, 2025 at midnight.

== Programming ==
=== Final programming ===
- Archer (Archer)
- Beavis and Butt-Head (Beavis és Butt-head)
- The Big Bang Theory (Agymenők)
- Bob Hearts Abishola (Bob szereti Abisholát)
- Brickleberry (Brickleberry)
- Comedy Central Presents (A Comedy Central bemutatja...)
- Drawn Together (Firka Villa)
- Family Guy (Family Guy)
- Fugget About It (Tartsd a szádat!)
- Most Ridiculous (Láttad már?)
- My Name Is Earl (A nevem Earl)
- Rules of Engagement (Egy kapcsolat szabályai)
- South Park (South Park)
- Takeshi's Castle Indonesia (Takeshi küldetés)
- The Daily Show
- The Odd Couple (Furcsa pár)
- Young Sheldon (Az ifjú Sheldon)

=== Former programming ===
- A Bit of Fry & Laurie (Egy kis Fry és Laurie)
- According to Jim (Jim szerint a világ)
- 'Allo 'Allo! (Halló, halló!)
- Arrested Development (Az ítélet család)
- Banánhéj (Hungarian sitcom)
- Beugró (Hungarian sitcom, seasons 2 and 3)
- Bob's Burgers (Bob burgerfalodája)
- The Cleveland Show (Cleveland Show)
- Coupling (Páran párban)
- Dads (Így neveld a faterod)
- Dharma & Greg (Dharma és Greg)
- Don't Trust the B— in Apartment 23 (Ne bízz a ribiben!)
- Drawn Together (Firka Villa)
- Drunk History (Tömény történelem)
- Friends (Jóbarátok)
- Gary Unmarried (2012–2014, as Elvált Gary)
- Happy Endings (Happy Endings – Fuss el véle!)
- How I Met Your Mother (Így jártam anyátokkal)
- How Not to Live Your Life (Hogy ne éld az életed)
- I Live with Models (Modellek közt)
- Irigy Hónaljmirigy (a Hungarian sitcom)
- The IT Crowd (Kockafejek)
- It's Always Sunny in Philadelphia (Felhőtlen Philadelphia)
- Joey
- Késő este Hajós Andrással (Late Night with Hajós András - a Hungarian comedy talk show)
- The King of Queens (Férjek gyöngye)
- Kröd Mändoon and the Flaming Sword of Fire
- Kung Fu Panda: Legends of Awesomeness (Kung Fu Panda: A rendkívüliség legendája)
- Modern Family (Modern család)
- The League of Gentlemen (Kretének Klubja)
- Little Britain (Angolkák)
- Louie
- Malcolm in the Middle (Már megint Malcolm)
- Mike and Molly (Mike és Molly)
- The Millers (A Miller család)
- Moonbeam City (Holdfényváros)
- Mr. Bean (Mr. Bean)
- My Hero (Én hősöm)
- My Wife and Kids (Életem értelmei)
- The Neighborhood (Jószomszédok)
- Neighbors from Hell (Pokoli szomszédok)
- The New Adventures of Old Christine (Christine kalandjai)
- The Office US (A hivatal)
- The Penguins of Madagascar (A Madagaszkár pingvinjei)
- Reba
- The Sarah Silverman Program
- Scrubs (Dokik)
- The Simpsons (A Simpson család)
- Splitting Up Together (Elválótársak)
- SpongeBob SquarePants (SpongyaBob Kockanadrág)
- Suburgatory (Kertvárosba száműzve)
- Threesome (2014, as Édeshármas)
- Ugly Americans (Furcsa Amcsik)
- Van képünk hozzá (Hungarian sitcom)
- Vastyúk is talál szeget (Hungarian sketch comedy)
- Workaholics (A munka hősei)
- Yes, Dear (Igen, drágám!)
- You Rang, M'Lord? (Csengetett, Mylord?)
