= MTV (Hungarian TV channel) =

MTV Hungary
- Final logo, used from 14 September 2021 to 1 April 2022.
- Country: Hungary
- Broadcast area: Hungary

Ownership
- Owner: Paramount Networks EMEAA

History
- Launched: 1 October 2007; 18 years ago (first time); 3 October 2017; 8 years ago (second time)
- Closed: 1 December 2013; 12 years ago (first time); 1 April 2022; 4 years ago (second time)
- Replaced by: MTV Global

Links
- Website: Official site

MTV Hungary was a Hungarian pay television channel owned by Paramount Global.

== History ==
A local MTV Hungary was launched on 1 October 2007, replacing MTV Europe. However, this was closed on December 1, 2013, with MTV Europe replacing MTV Hungary.

On October 3, 2017, it was relaunched with the Hungarian block of music videos airing between 9:00 and 21:00, and the remainder was being taken over by MTV Europe programming. All programming on the MTV Europe block became available in either Hungarian subtitles or dubbing.

From March 2020, for an unknown reason, the Hungarian programming block was controversially reduced to 4 hours between 17:00 to 21:00, then to 4 hours 15 minutes between 17:00 and 21:15.

On February 17, 2021, further changes were made to MTV available in Hungary. Instead of the localized version of MTV Europe with Hungarian subtitles/advertising, the channel broadcasts MTV Poland with localized advertising and subtitles. A Hungarian music block takes place between 17:00 and 21:00 featuring content from MTV Hits, Club MTV and MTV's chart shows.

The channel was rebranded between 14 September and 1 October 2021.

From 1 October 2021, the Hungarian programming block was got longer broadcast time. On weekdays to 5 hours 25 minutes between 15:35 and 21:00. On weekends to 5 hours 50 minutes between 15:10 and 21:00.

On 1 April 2022, it was shut down and replaced by MTV Global.

== Music shows ==
2007–2010:

- Swung
- Alternative Nation
- Be My DJ
- MTV Blokk
- Top Selection
- Rock Chart
- Headbangers Ball
- Korai Dalömlés ( Morning Glory )

2010–2013:

- Folyt.köv
- Top 10@10

2017–2020:

- MTV Hits
- MTV 100% Music
- MTV Hot&Fresh
- MTV Throwback
- Hello Weekend
- MTV MUSIC BATTLE
- MTV Local Heroes
- MTV Girl Power
- MTV Pump It Up
- MTV Party Hard
- Monday Mixer
- MTV Chart Show
- Top 5
- Top 10
- brand:new
- Your Playlist
- Club MTV
- MTV Club Chart
- MTV Online Chart
- MTV Base Chart
- Local Chart
- CCC's Music Chart

2020–2021:

- MTV Hits
- Club MTV
- Local Chart

2021–2022:

- MTV Hits
- Club MTV
- Local Chart
- EMA TOP 10 (October 2021 only)
- EMA TOP 20 (October 2021 only)

== Scripted and reality shows ==
- Engine Room
- MTV Cribs
- Teen Cribs
- Best Show Ever
- The Hills
- Disaster Date
- Jersey Shore
- The Hard Times of RJ Berger
- The Real World
- The City
- Baby High
- South Park
- Made
- Taking the Stage
- The Hills
- Jackass
- America's Best Dancecrew
- Valemont
- A Shot at Love
- MTV at the Movies
- From G's to Gents
- My life as Liz
- Paris Hilton's My New BFF

== MTV trademark suit ==
Magyar Televízió, Hungary's public broadcaster who has a trademark on the initials MTV, registered with the Hungarian copyright office, sued the American MTV network for trademark infringement when the Hungarian version of the music channel was launched in 2007. The suit is ended on December 2008, and Magyar Televízió lost it.

== See also ==
- Comedy Central
- Nickelodeon
