= Paramount International Networks =

International division of Paramount Media Networks

- Final logo, used from 2022 to 2026
- Formerly: MTV Networks International (1987–2011); Viacom International Media Networks (2011–2019); ViacomCBS Networks International (2019–2022)
- Type: Division
- Industry: Broadcasting
- Founded: 1 August 1987; 39 years ago
- Defunct: October 6, 2026; 46 days ago
- Fate: Merged with Warner Bros. Discovery International
- Successor: Skydance Global Content Sales
- Headquarters: 1515 Broadway, New York City, U.S.; 17-29 Hawley Crescent, Camden Town, London, England
- Key people: Kevin MacLellan (president, International and Global Content Distribution); Josh Silverman (president, Global Products and Experiences)
- Parent: Viacom (1987–2005; 2005–2019); Paramount Global (2019–2025) (Note: Formerly known as ViacomCBS from 2019 to 2022.); Paramount Skydance (2025–2026)
- Divisions: Paramount Networks Americas; Paramount Networks EMEAA; Paramount Networks UK & Australia

Paramount International Networks (PIN) was the international division of the Paramount Media Networks division of Paramount Skydance that overseen the production, broadcasting and promotion of its brands outside of the United States. These brands include Paramount Network, Comedy Central, MTV, Nickelodeon and BET, as well as CBS-branded channels co-owned with AMC Networks International. PIN also owned a 30% stake in the Rainbow S.p.A. animation studio in Italy from 2011 to 2023 and a majority-then-later-minority stake in Viacom18, an Indian joint venture with domestic partner TV18, which operates the former's television brands in India along with homegrown brand Colors from 2007 to 2024.

The division is headquartered within offices of the former Paramount Global in New York City and London, with other international offices located in São Paulo, Berlin, Stockholm, Amsterdam, Warsaw, Lagos, Madrid, Milan, Mumbai, Paris, Singapore, Budapest, Belgrade and Sydney amongst others. Its first international offices opened in the late 1980s in London and Amsterdam with the launch of MTV Europe (now MTV Global). It was created from a rebrand of predecessor Viacom's MTV Networks, which included MTV, BET, VH1 and Nickelodeon, to include Comedy Central. MTV Asia was a leader against rival Channel V in China, India and South Korea in 1999.

The division was previously led by Pam Kaufman as part of her broader role as president and CEO of International Markets, Global Consumer Products & Experiences. Kaufman departed Paramount in September 2025 following the company's acquisition by Skydance Media. Her former role was subsequently split into two positions: Kevin MacLellan was appointed president of International and Global Content Distribution, while Josh Silverman was hired as president of Global Products and Experiences, overseeing consumer products, live experiences, publishing, partnerships and ecommerce.

== History ==
In June 2008, MTV Networks International partnered with Dutch entertainment company Endemol to launch its joint-venture Dutch comedy channel under the former's Comedy Central brand with the new comedy channel being named Comedy Central Family.

In November 2009, MTV Networks International teamed up with Abu Dhabi-based entertainment company Twofour54 to establish an Arabian comedy content production studio that would produce and develop local Arabic-language comedy content for the Middle East called Comedy Central Studios Arabia, the new studio would be headquartered at Twofour54's Abu Dhabi offices and would also adapt localized versions of Comedy Central's programming library for the Arabic market.

On 29 July 2010, MTV Networks International announced its launching of its Hebrew-language television channel entitled Comedy Central Israel which had launched the following year on 1 January 2011, marking the ten country to use the Comedy Central brand.

In May 2011 following MTV Networks International renaming to Viacom International Media Networks and its launch of Dutch channel Comedy Central Family with global production & distribution studio Endemol three years ago in 2008, Viacom International Media Networks alongside global Dutch entertainment production & distribution giant Endemol had expanded their partnership with the two companies had established a female-skewed entertainment channel based in Poland that will target women aged 16 to 49 named Viacom Blink!, the launch of the new entertainment channel Viacom Blink! had gained Viacom International Media Networks another entertainment channel in its portfolio as Viacom Internation Media Networks have licensed Endemol's programming library to the new channel under a programming deal with the former planning to launch the channel to other countries.

At the start of May 2014, Viacom International Media Networks announced it had signed a definitive agreement to acquire British free-to-air public broadcast television channel Channel 5 alongside its parent company Channel 5 Broadcasting Limited and its three entertainment channels 5* and US programming-focus channel 5USA from Richard Desmond's British publishing company Northern & Shell for £450m (US$759 million).

In October 2015, Viacom International Media Networks had established its international production division that would serve as a production hub for its global entertainment network brands worldwide, including Nickelodeon, MTV and Comedy Central entitled Viacom International Studios which would be based in Miami, Florida to expand Viacom's production capabilities for global networks as the new international studio would produce local adaptations of Viacom's productions including original scripted & unscripted content worldwide for its global networks & mobile and digital platforms internationally with VIMN president Bob Bakish heading the new international production division Viacom International Studios as president, Viacom International Studios had also opened up a new production studio facility based in Miami, Florida where VIMN's Latin American division VIMN Americas was headquartered following the launch of Viacom International Studios, with the new production studio facility would be served as the production of Viacom International Studios' productions.

== Divisions ==
Since 14 January 2020, this division consists of two brand groups (Entertainment and Youth Brands, Kids and Family), and three regional hubs (UK & Australia, EMEAA and Americas).

=== United Kingdom and Australia ===
Paramount Networks UK & Australia, formerly ViacomCBS Networks UK and Australia was a regional subsidiary of Paramount Global launched on 14 January 2020 and headquartered in London with a local office in Sydney that served the United Kingdom and Australia. It also overseed Channel 5 Broadcasting Limited and Paramount Australia & New Zealand, the respective corporate overseers of British free-to-air channel, Channel 5 and Australian free-to-air channel Network 10.

=== Europe, Middle East, Africa, and Asia ===
Paramount Networks EMEAA, formerly MTV Networks Europe, Viacom International Media Networks Europe and ViacomCBS Networks EMEAA, was a subsidiary of Paramount Global which served Europe, the Middle East, Africa and Asia.

It consisted of the following branches:

- Paramount Networks Northern Europe, which served Benelux (the Netherlands, Belgium, Luxembourg), Nordic/Scandinavian countries (Denmark, Finland, Norway, Sweden), Ireland, DAPOL (Germany, Austria, Poland), German-speaking Switzerland, Estonia, Latvia, Lithuania, Hungary, North Macedonia, Romania, Ukraine and CIS countries.
- Paramount Networks Southern Europe, Middle East, and Africa (SEMEA), which served France, French-speaking Switzerland, Italy, Spain, Portugal, the Middle East and Africa.
  - Paramount Networks Italia, a division that was founded in 2011 in order for Viacom to purchase a 30% ownership stake in the Rainbow S.p.A. animation studio.

=== The Americas ===
Paramount Networks Americas, formerly MTV Networks Latin America, Viacom International Media Networks The Americas and ViacomCBS Networks Americas, was a regional subsidiary of Paramount International Networks. Its operational headquarters was located in Miami, Florida, with offices in Mexico, Brazil, Argentina, Chile and Colombia.

=== Production company ===
In 2016, Viacom launched its own subsidiary Viacom International Studios, which have its headquarters in Miami. Its first production was I Am Frankie for Nickelodeon. Following the Viacom-CBS merger, it was rebranded to ViacomCBS International Studios (or simply VIS). On 24 June 2020, both ViacomCBS International Studios and sister sibling Miramax is planning on to co-produce The Turkish Detective, the series adaptation of the novels. On 2 September 2020, it returned to production with Mexico's backdoor structure On 7 October 2020, ViacomCBS International Studios revealed a streamlining its sales structure. On 30 November 2021, the studio launched a first-look deal program with 5 British writers to amplify diverse voices.

With its parent company rebranded to Paramount Global in 2022, its international division was rebranded as Paramount Television International Studios (PTIS).

== Comedy Central ==
=== Current channels ===
- Africa
- Comedy Central Africa
- Flanders
- Comedy Central Belgium
- France
- Comedy Central France
- Germany
- Comedy Central Germany
- Israel
- Comedy Central Israel
- Italy
- Comedy Central Italy
- Latin America
- Comedy Central Latin America
- Netherlands
- Comedy Central Netherlands
- Poland
- Comedy Central Poland
- Polsat Comedy Central Extra
- Romania
- Comedy Central Romania
- Spain
- Comedy Central Spain
- United Kingdom and Ireland (Note: Co-owned by Sky Group)
- Comedy Central UK & Ireland
- Comedy Central Extra

=== Former channels ===
- Adriatic/Balkans region (Note: Serving Albania, Bosnia and Herzegovina, Bulgaria, Croatia, Kosovo, North Macedonia, Montenegro, Romania, Serbia, and Slovenia)
- Comedy Central Extra Adria (Note: Comedy Central Extra Adria was closed on 14 July 2020 and was replaced by Nicktoons Adria)
- Australia and New Zealand
- Comedy Central Australia & New Zealand
- Austria
- Comedy Central Austria (Note: Comedy Central Austria closed on 1 January 2026 and was replaced by Comedy Central Germany)
- Arabia
- Comedy Central Middle East
- Asia
- Comedy Central Asia
- Brazil
- Comedy Central Brazil (Note: Closed on 1 January 2026)
- Canada
- Comedy Central Canada (Note: Owned by Bell Media, now as CTV Comedy Channel; programming shared with Much)
- CIS and Georgia
- Comedy Central CIS & Georgia
- Denmark
- Comedy Central Denmark (Note: Comedy Central Denmark was closed on 8 January 2019 and was replaced by Paramount Network Denmark)
- Hungary
- Comedy Central Hungary
- Comedy Central Family Hungary
- India (Note: Channels owned by Viacom18, under license from Paramount Global)
- Comedy Central India
- Italy
- Comedy Central +1 Italy
- Netherlands
- Comedy Central Extra Netherlands
- Comedy Central Family Netherlands
- Norway
- Comedy Central Norway (Note: Comedy Central Norway was closed on 15 January 2019 and was replaced by Paramount Network Norway)
- Russia
- Comedy Central Russia
- Sweden
- Comedy Central Sweden (Note: Comedy Central Sweden was closed on 15 January 2019 and was replaced by Paramount Network Sweden)
- Switzerland
- Comedy Central Schweiz (Note: Comedy Central Schweiz closed on 12 January 2022 and was replaced by Comedy Central Germany)
- Ukraine
- Comedy Central Ukraine

== MTV ==
=== Current channels ===
- Worldwide
- MTV Global
- France
- MTV France
- Germany
- MTV Germany
- India (Note: Channels owned by JioStar, under license from Paramount Networks EMEAA)
- MTV India
- Israel
- MTV Israel
- MTV Music (Israel)
- MTV Hits (Israel)
- MTV 00s (Israel)
- Italy
- MTV Italy
- Japan (Note: Channel owned by Amdocs Japan Co., Ltd., under license from Paramount Networks EMEAA)
- MTV Japan
- Latin America
- MTV Latin America
- Netherlands and Belgium
- MTV Nederland and België
- Poland
- MTV Poland
- Spain
- MTV Spain
- Taiwan
- MTV Taiwan (Note: Co-owned by Sanlih E-Television)
- United Kingdom
- MTV UK

=== Former channels ===
- Worldwide
- MTV International
- MTV Hits
- MTV Live
- MTV 80s
- MTV 90s
- MTV 00s
- Club MTV
- Adriatic Region (Note: Serving Albania, Bosnia and Herzegovina, Croatia, Kosovo, North Macedonia, Montenegro, Serbia, and Slovenia)
- MTV Adria
- Africa
- MTV Base
- Australia & New Zealand
- CMT Australia
- MTV Australia & New Zealand
- MTV New Zealand
- MTV Classic Australia & New Zealand
- MTV Hits Australia & New Zealand
- MTV Music Australia & New Zealand
- Club MTV Australia
- Africa and MENA
- MTV Africa
- Austria
- MTV Austria
- Belarus
- MTV Belarus (2006-2009)
- Brazil
- MTV Brazil (1990–2013)
- MTV Brazil (Note: Closed on 1 January 2026)
- Canada
- MTV Canada
- MTV2 Canada
- China
- MTV China
- Czech Republic & Slovakia
- MTV Czech Republic
- Denmark
- MTV Denmark
- Estonia
- MTV Estonia
- Europe
- MTV Music 24
- MTV Rocks
- Finland
- MTV Finland
- France
- Game One Music 3D
- Game One Music HD (Note: closed in September 2016)
- MTV Idol (Note: replaced by both MTV Hits France & BET France on 17 November 2015)
- MTV Pulse France
- MTV Base France
- MTV Hits France
- Germany
- MTV2 Pop (Note: replaced with Nickelodeon in 2005)
- Greece
- MTV Greece
- Hungary
- MTV Hungary
- India
- MTV Beats
- Indonesia
- MTV Indonesia (Note: Joint venture with Karsa Group)
- Italy
- MTV Brand New Italy
- MTV Classic Italy
- MTV Pulse Italy
- QOOB (Note: Closed in 2009 and the channel has been replaced in 2011)
- MTV Music Italy (Note: Replaced on DTT by VH1 Italy in March 2016. Available only on Sky Italia.)
- Latin America
- MTV Hits Latin America
- Lithuania & Latvia
- MTV Lithuania & Latvia
- Middle East
- MTV Middle East
- Netherlands
- TMF (Note: except TMF Vlaanderen; all others replaced with VIVA in 2009)
- MTV Brand New Netherlands (Note: Closed on 1 February 2021)
- Norway
- MTV Norway
- Pakistan
- MTV Pakistan
- Philippines
- MTV Pinoy (Note: Joint venture with Viva Entertainment)
- MTVph (Note: Joint venture with Solar Entertainment Corporation)
- MTV Philippines (Note: Co-owned by All Youth Channels, a subsidiary of ABS-CBN Corporation's Creative Programs)
- Poland
- MTV Classic Poland
- MTV Music Poland
- Portugal
- MTV Portugal
- Romania
- MTV Romania
- Russia
- MTV Russia
- Scandinavia/Nordic
- MTV Nordic
- South Korea
- SBS M (Note: Joint venture with SBS)
- Southeast Asia
- MTV Asia (first incarnation)
- MTV Southeast Asia
- Sweden
- MTV Sweden
- Switzerland
- MTV Schweiz
- Taiwan
- MTV Taiwan (first incarnation)
- Thailand
- MTV Thailand (Note: Co-owned by MCOT)
- Turkey
- MTV Turkey
- Ukraine
- MTV Ukraine
- United Kingdom & Ireland
- MTV Extra
- MTV Flux
- MTV Base
- MTV Classic
- MTV OMG
- MTV Rocks
- MTV Hits UK
- MTV 80s UK
- MTV 90s UK
- Club MTV UK
- MTV Music UK
- Vietnam
- MTV Vietnam (Note: Joint venture with IMC Group)

== Nickelodeon ==
=== Current channels ===
- Worldwide
- Nickelodeon Global Unlimited
- Nickelodeon Global Limited
- Australia
- Nickelodeon Australia
- Bulgaria
- Nickelodeon Bulgaria
- CIS & Baltics
- Nickelodeon CIS & Baltics
- Croatia & Bosnia
- Nickelodeon Croatia
- Czech Republic
- Nickelodeon Czech Republic
- France & Wallonia
- Nickelodeon France
- Nickelodeon Wallonia
- Germany
- Nickelodeon Germany
- Hungary
- Nickelodeon Hungary
- India
- Nickelodeon India
- Sonic
- Israel
- Nickelodeon Israel
- Italy
- Nickelodeon Italy
- Latin America
- Nickelodeon Latin America
- Malaysia
- Nickelodeon Malaysia
- Netherlands & Flanders
- Nickelodeon Netherlands
- Nickelodeon Flanders
- Philippines
- Nickelodeon Philippines
- Poland
- Nickelodeon Poland
- Romania
- Nickelodeon Romania
- Serbia & Montenegro
- Nickelodeon Serbia
- Slovenia
- Nickelodeon Slovenia
- Spain
- Nickelodeon Spain
- Sub-Saharan Africa
- Nickelodeon Africa
- Switzerland
- Nickelodeon Schweiz
- Turkey
- Nickelodeon Turkey
- United Kingdom and Ireland
- Nickelodeon UK & Ireland

=== Former channels ===
- Australia (pay-TV)
- Nickelodeon Australia
- Austria
- Nickelodeon Austria (Note: Nickelodeon/Comedy Central Austria was closed on 30 June 2025 and was replaced by Nickelodeon/Comedy Central+1 Germany)
- Armenia
- Nickelodeon (Armenian TV programming block)
- Brazil
- Nickelodeon Brazil (Note: Closed on 1 January 2026)
- Canada
- Nickelodeon Canada
- China
- HaHa Nick (Note: Nickelodeon TV block, closed in October 2007)
- Denmark
- Nickelodeon Denmark
- Estonia
- Nickelodeon (Estonian TV programming block)
- Europe
- NickMusic EMEA
- Finland
- Nickelodeon Finland
- Greece
- Nickelodeon Greece
- India
- Nickelodeon HD+ (Note: Nickelodeon HD+ was closed on 15 June 2026 and replaced with an HD+ simulcast of Nickelodeon India)
- Italy
- Nickelodeon +1 (Italy)
- Japan
- Nickelodeon Japan
- Middle East and North Africa
- Nickelodeon MENA
- New Zealand
- Nickelodeon New Zealand (old version) (Note: Now defunct, replaced by the Australian version)
- Nickelodeon New Zealand
- Norway
- Nickelodeon Norway
- Pakistan
- Nickelodeon Pakistan
- Portugal
- Nickelodeon Portugal
- Scandinavia
- Nickelodeon Scandinavia/Nordic
- South Korea
- KiZmom
- Sweden
- Nickelodeon Sweden
- Ukraine
- Nickelodeon (Ukraine TV Block) (Note: Closed in September 2017 as a block)
- Nickelodeon Ukraine Pluto TV (Note: Closed on Pluto TV in June 2023)
- Nickelodeon Ukraine

== Nick Jr. Channel ==
=== Current channels ===
- Africa
- Nick Jr. (Sub-Saharan Africa)
- CIS and Georgia
- Nick Jr. CIS and Georgia
- France & Wallonia
- Nickelodeon Junior
- Nick Jr. (Wallonia)
- Germanic countries
- Nick Jr. Germany, Austria & Switzerland
- India
- Nick Jr. (India)
- Israel
- Nick Jr. (Israel)
- Italy
- Nick Jr. (Italy)
- Latin America
- Nick Jr. (Latin America)
- Middle East and North Africa
- Nick Jr. (Middle East and North Africa)
- Netherlands & Flanders
- Nick Jr. Netherlands & Flanders
- Poland
- Nick Jr. (Poland)
- Portugal
- Nick Jr. (Portugal)
- Romania
- Nick Jr. (Romania)
- Scandinavia (Note: Denmark, Finland, Norway, Sweden)
- Nick Jr. Scandinavia
- Spain
- Nick Jr. (Spain)
- Southeast Asia
- Nick Jr. (Southeast Asia)
- Turkey
- Nick Jr. (Turkey)
- United Kingdom and Ireland
- Nick Jr. UK & Ireland
- Nick Jr. Too

=== Former channels ===
- Australia
- Nick Jr. (Australia & New Zealand)
- Brazil
- Nick Jr. (Brazil)
- Greece
- Nick Jr. (Greece)
- Italy
- Nick Jr. +1 (Italy)
- Netherlands
- Kindernet

== Nicktoons and TeenNick ==
=== Current channels ===
- Worldwide
- Nicktoons Global
- Africa
- Nicktoons Africa
- Bulgaria
- Nicktoons Bulgaria
- Croatia & Bosnia
- Nicktoons Croatia
- Czech Republic
- Nicktoons Czech Republic
- France
- Nicktoons France (Note: On 15 July 2025, Nickelodeon Teen was rebranded to Nicktoons France)
- Germanic countries
- Nicktoons Germany, Austria & Switzerland
- Hungary
- Nicktoons Hungary
- Israel
- TeenNick Israel
- Middle East and North Africa
- Nicktoons MENA
- TeenNick MENA
- Netherlands & Flanders
- Nicktoons Netherlands & Flanders
- Poland
- Nicktoons Poland
- TeenNick Poland
- Romania
- Nicktoons Romania
- Scandinavia
- Nicktoons Scandinavia
- Serbia & Montenegro
- Nicktoons Serbia
- Slovenia
- Nicktoons Slovenia
- Turkey
- Nicktoons Turkey
- United Kingdom and Ireland
- Nicktoons UK & Ireland

=== Former channels ===
- Czech Republic
- TeenNick Czech Republic
- France
- Nickelodeon Teen (Note: On 15 July 2025, Nickelodeon Teen was rebranded to Nicktoons France)
- Greece
- TeenNick Greece
- TeenNick Greece (Block)
- Hungary
- TeenNick Hungary
- India
- TeenNick (Indian TV Block)
- Italy
- TeenNick Italy
- Latin America
- Nicktoons Latin America
- TeenNick Latin America
- Netherlands & Flanders
- TeenNick Netherlands & Flanders (Note: TeenNick Netherlands timeshared with Nickelodeon Netherlands between 14 February 2011 and 30 September 2015)
- Romania
- TeenNick Romania
- Russia & CIS
- Nicktoons Russia
- Ukraine
- Nicktoons Ukraine
- United Kingdom and Ireland
- Nicktoonsters (Note: British spinoff of Nicktoons U.K., closed 31 July 2009. Replaced by Nicktoons Replay (1-hour delayed timeshift feed of main Nicktoons channel))
- Vietnam
- TeenNick Vietnam (Block)

== Paramount Network ==
=== Current channels ===
- Netherlands
- Paramount Network Netherlands
- Poland
- Paramount Network Poland (Note: Formerly Viacom Bink!)

=== Former channels ===
- Australia and New Zealand
- Spike Australia
- Arabia
- Paramount Channel Arabia
- Asia
- Paramount Network Asia
- Austria
- Paramount Network Austria
- Brazil
- Paramount Network Brazil
- Canada
- Paramount Network Canada
- Czech Republic
- Prima Comedy Central
- Paramount Network Czech Republic
- Denmark
- Paramount Network Denmark
- Finland
- Paramount Network Finland
- Flanders
- Spike Flanders
- France
- Paramount Network France
- Hungary
- Paramount Network Hungary (Note: Formerly RTL Spike (Licensed by RTL Group))
- Italy
- Paramount Network Italy
- Latin America
- Paramount Network Latin America
- Norway
- Paramount Network Norway
- Romania & Moldova
- Paramount Channel Romania & Moldova
- Russia and CIS
- Paramount Channel Russia and CIS
- Spain
- Paramount Network Spain
- Sweden
- Paramount Network Sweden
- United Kingdom
- 5Spike (Note: Part of the Channel 5 network, 2015–2020. Now 5Action)

== Other networks ==
- CMT Canada
- Smithsonian Channel Canada

=== Ananey (Israel) ===
- Food Channel
- Health Channel
- Travel Channel
- Good Life Channel
- Ego Channel

=== Channel 5 (United Kingdom) ===
- 5
- 5Select
- 5Star
- 5USA
- 5Action

=== Legend and True Crime (co-owned with AMC Networks International) (UK) ===
- Legend
- Legend Xtra
- True Crime
- True Crime Xtra

=== Network 10 (Australia) ===
- Network 10
- 10 Comedy
- 10 Drama
- 10 HD

== Former channels ==
- Chilevisión (Chile)
- Game One (France)
- J-One (France)
- Super! (Italy)

=== BET ===
- BET Canada
- BET France
- BET International

=== VH1 ===
- VH1 Brazil
  - VH1 HD
- VH1 MegaHits
- VH1 Denmark
- VH1 Classic Europe
- VH1 Europe (Note: Amsterdam only; replaced with Nickelodeon)
- VH-1 Germany
- VH1 India
- VH1 Indonesia
- VH1 Italy
- VH1 Latin America
- VH1 Pakistan
- VH1 UK & Ireland
  - VH2 (Note: replaced with MTV Flux in summer 2006)

=== CBS International (co-owned with AMC Networks International) ===
- CBS Action
- Film Cafe (previously CBS Europa)
- CBS Reality
- CBS Justice

=== Smithsonian Channel ===
- Smithsonian Channel Africa
- Smithsonian Channel (Asia) (Note: Joint with Rock Entertainment Holdings)
- Smithsonian Channel Latin America
- Smithsonian Channel UK

=== Telefe ===
- Telefe is an Argentinian television station launched on 15 January 1990.
- Telefe Internacional is the international signal of Telefe.

=== TMF ===
- The Music Factory
  - TMF Flanders
  - TMF Netherlands

=== VIVA ===
VIVA Media GmbH (until 2004 VIVA Media AG) was a music television network originating from Germany. It was founded as an alternative to MTV by Time Warner executives Tom McGrath and Peter Bogner with Rudi Dolezal and Hannes Rossacher from DoRo Productions, which created music videos. The channel was a broadcast of VIVA Germany as VIVA Media AG in 1993 later in 1995 of Viva Zwei launch, and has been owned by their former competitor Viacom, the parent company of MTV, since 2004. Viva channels exist in some European countries; the first spin-offs were launched in Poland and Switzerland in 2000.

==== Austria ====
VIVA Austria was launched in May 2012, 15% of the channel's programming consists of Austrian music, music tops, and lifestyle programming focused on the Austrian market. The channels marketing and promotion are managed by Goldback Media. Before 2012, VIVA Germany aired across Austria with localized advertising and sponsorship for Austria.

==== Germany ====
VIVA Germany

==== German-speaking Switzerland ====
VIVA Switzerland

==== Poland ====
VIVA Poland was a Polish music channel launched on 10 June 2000 by the German VIVA Media AG. On 17 July 2012, the channel stopped being an FTA network and was pulled off from Eutelsat Hot Bird 13A satellite. In 2014, the station canceled local production shows. From 2015 to 2017, the station canceled all reality TV shows and continued playing only electronic dance music. Before the new broadcast schedule, the station was playing Polish and international pop, dance, rock, and hip hop music.

==== Hungary ====
VIVA Hungary was a music channel launched on 27 June 1997 as Z+. Like its sister channels, the channel features localized music videos, programming, presenters, and chart shows. The channel started to use the new logo on 2 April 2012. The channel ended broadcast on 3 October 2017 replaced by MTV Music.

==== United Kingdom & Ireland ====
VIVA UK & Ireland was launched on 26 October 2009, replacing TMF, and ceased broadcasting on 31 January 2018.
