= MTV Hits (France) =

- Country: France
- Broadcast area: France, Belgium, Switzerland, Luxembourg

Programming
- Language: French
- Picture format: 16:9, 1080i (HDTV)

Ownership
- Owner: Paramount Networks EMEAA
- Sister channels: MTV; BET; Nickelodeon; Nickelodeon Junior; Nicktoons; Game One; Comedy Central; J-One; Paramount Network

History
- Launched: 17 November 2015; 10 years ago
- Replaced: MTV Base; MTV Pulse; MTV Idol; MTV Hits (Europe)
- Closed: 31 December 2025; 6 months ago

MTV Hits was a French music television channel from Paramount Networks EMEAA launched on 17 November 2015.

== History ==
The channels MTV Base, MTV Pulse and MTV Idol merged on November 17, 2015, replaced by MTV Hits. At the same time, BET became its own channel, My MTV, an interactive music channel was created, MTV Rocks was removed from CanalSat while MTV Dance, VH1 and VH1 Classic were added to Numericable.

After weeks of negotiations an agreement has been reached between the Viacom and Canal+ groups, Canal retained the BET, MTV Hits and J-One channels.

Since April 2019, MTV Hits is available on all SFR networks (ADSL/FTTH/FTTB).

Since November 19, 2019, the channels of the ViacomCBS International Media Networks France group including J-One, Nickelodeon channels and other MTV and MTV Hits channels are now distributed to ADSL/Fiber operators which marks the end of exclusivity with Canal+, such as Free on November 19, 2019, the OTT platform Molotov TV on November 28, since January 28, 2020 at Bouygues Telecom and to Orange on July 8, 2020.

Since January 14, 2020, the channel changes its numbering and was on channel 183 of the operator Canal+.

On October 8, 2021, the channel changed its logo and look. That same day at 9pm, it broadcast an exclusive concert of Madonna's Madame X Tour, recorded in Lisbon.

The channel ceased broadcast on Canal+ on 20 April 2022.

The channel closed on 31 December 2025. The final music video playing on this channel was Gabriela by Katseye before the channel's closing at 6:00 AM CET.

=== Visual identity (logo) ===
Logo used from 17 November 2015 - 30 April 2017

Logo used from 1 May 2017 - 7 October 2021

Logo used from 8 October 2021 - 31 December 2025

== Programming ==
At its launch, it took most of the programming of the former channels MTV Base, MTV Pulse and MTV Idol initially branded as En Mode Base, En Mode Pulse and En Mode Idol. The channel also aired music-related reality shows and documentaries during evenings and late-night.

=== Music programming ===
- 10 meilleurs clips
  - 10 meilleurs clips electronic
  - 10 meilleurs clips France
  - 10 meilleurs clips pop
  - 10 meilleurs clips rap
  - 10 meilleurs clips USA
- Beats & Lyrics
- Club Party
- Hip-Hop My House
- Les 50 meilleurs clips
- Les papas du rock
- MTV Breakfast Club
- MTV Classics Only (Rap & R&B only)
- MTV Insomnia
- Music & News
- MTV World Stage
- My Life on MTV
- Rap Only
