= Mon Nickelodeon Junior =

- Country: France
- Broadcast area: France

Programming
- Language: French

Ownership
- Owner: MTV Networks Europe; CanalSat
- Sister channels: Nickelodeon; Nickelodeon Junior; MTV France; Game One; MTV Pulse; MTV Base

Links
- Website: Official website

Mon Nickelodeon Junior (My Nickelodeon Junior) is a French edutainment TV channel which is customizable by parents and has no advertisements. The channel adapts to the preferences to each child and is exclusive to Canal+ subscribers only via SFR Evolution, Orange and Free.

== About ==
Mon Nickelodeon Junior is the first edutainment TV channel entirely customizable by parents and without advertising, which adapts to the preferences of each child. This is a unique broadcast TV experience in the world for unique children to learn while having fun. Parents can create a chain effect for their child, according to their age and sex, edutainment themes from the programs broadcast on Nickelodeon Junior and the desired viewing times.

The channel constantly adapts the preferences of each child which may at any time give its opinion on what it sees, and the edutainment themes sought by each parent at each stage of their child's development.

== Programming ==
Mon Nickelodeon Junior also broadcasts shows from the Nickelodeon Junior channel. The channel will be regularly enriched with new programs.

== Availability ==
The channel is exclusively available on TV to all CanalSat subscribers which can be seen on channel 153 via SFR Evolution box and free subscription. The channel is also available on PC, tablet and on smartphone which makes it a multi-screen experience. Indeed, every child can start a session watching the channel on the TV and finish it on the tablet or computer screen. Similarly, two children from the same household can simultaneously watch all their custom string on two different screens.

The channel's app can be downloaded on tablet via Google Play and on iPad or iPhone through the Apple App Store
