= MTV Idol =

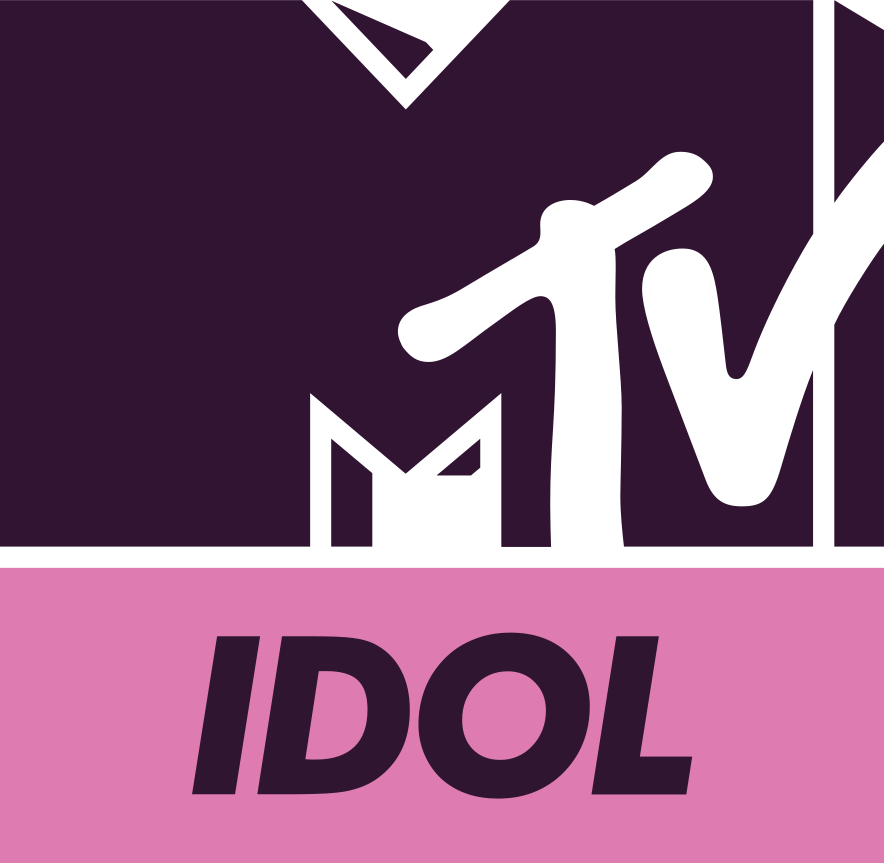
- Country: France
- Broadcast area: France, Belgium, Switzerland, Luxembourg

Programming
- Language: French
- Picture format: 16:9, 576i (SDTV); 16:9, 1080i (HDTV)

Ownership
- Owner: Viacom International Media Networks Europe
- Sister channels: MTV; MTV Base; MTV Pulse; BET; Nickelodeon; Nickelodeon Junior; Nickelodeon 4Teen; Game One; Game One Music; J-One; Paramount Channel

History
- Launched: 30 November 2005
- Closed: 17 November 2015
- Replaced by: MTV Hits

MTV Idol was a French television channel launched on November 30, 2005 owned by Viacom.It specialized in music and reality-shows, plus covering of news of artists of this era that have influenced French and French-speaking generations. It stopped broadcasting on 17 November 2015.

MTV Idol was founded in 2005 to serve French territories and was a retro channel and featured rerun of very popular cult broadcasting and programming of the MTV era including those of MTV Unplugged and reruns of popular series notably Beavis and Butt-Head. MTV Idol formed a package offering with other affiliated channels such as MTV, MTV Base and MTV Pulse. It was also available from 20 October 2009 until its cancellation on PlayStation Portable format.

MTV Idol ceased broadcasting in France on November 17, 2015, along with MTV Base and MTV Pulse, to be replaced by French version of MTV Hits and until the closing date of all of MTV's 24-hour music video channels on 31 December 2025.
