= MTV Base (France) =

Former French music TV channel

- Country: France
- Broadcast area: France, Belgium, Switzerland, Luxembourg

Programming
- Language: French
- Picture format: 16:9, 576i (SDTV); 16:9, 1080i (HDTV)

Ownership
- Owner: Viacom International Media Networks Europe
- Sister channels: MTV; MTV Idol; MTV Pulse; BET; Nickelodeon; Nickelodeon Junior; Nickelodeon 4Teen; Game One; Game One Music; J-One; Paramount Channel

History
- Launched: 21 December 2007; 17 years ago
- Closed: 17 November 2015; 10 years ago
- Replaced by: MTV Hits

Links
- Website: mtvbase.fr

MTV Base was a 24-hour French subscription music channel operated by Viacom International Media Networks Europe.

== History ==
A first channel, MTV Base UK was launched on 1 July 1999. This version of the channel will still be broadcast in France after the launch of the French version until 7 March 2008 where it is replaced by MTV Dance on Free and the other ADSL operators (as in all Europe except the UK and Ireland).

Launched on December 21, 2007, at 1pm, MTV Base focuses mainly on hip-hop and R'n'B. Its slogan is "La chaîne en Mode Hip-Hop R'n'B". It was launched on the second anniversary of the MTV Pulse and MTV Idol channels, complementing the channel offerings of the MTV Networks France bouquet. MTV Base is also for France "the reflection of the most popular musical genre in France" and targets in particular the 11/34 years.

In 2014, the channel changed targets by broadcasting less hip-hop music, and slowly began to focus on pop and dance content, such as One Direction, Taylor Swift and Calvin Harris.

MTV Base ceased broadcasting in France on November 17, 2015, along with MTV Pulse and MTV Idol, to be replaced by French version of MTV Hits and until the closing date of 31 December 2025.

=== Visual Identity (Logo) ===
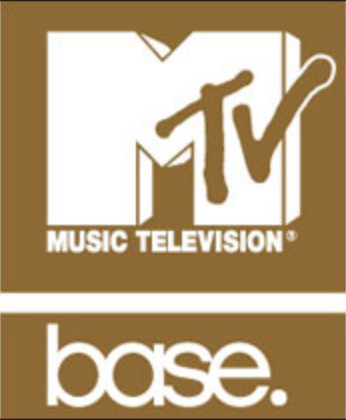
Logo used from 23 November 2009 - 1 July 2011

Logo used from 1 October 2013 - 17 November 2015

== Shows ==
- Beats and Lyrics
- French Only
- Hits Base
- Les 10 meilleurs clips français
- Les 50 meilleurs clips vacances
- Le Top Base
- Le Top US
- MTV Base News
