= MTV Pulse (France) =

Musical pop and rock television channel

- Country: France
- Broadcast area: France, Belgium, Switzerland, Luxembourg

Programming
- Language: French
- Picture format: 16:9, 576i (SDTV); 16:9, 1080i (HDTV)

Ownership
- Owner: Viacom International Media Networks Europe
- Sister channels: MTV; MTV Base; MTV Idol; BET; Nickelodeon; Nickelodeon Junior; Nickelodeon 4Teen; Game One; Game One Music; J-One; Paramount Channel

History
- Launched: 30 November 2005; 20 years ago
- Closed: 17 November 2015; 10 years ago
- Replaced by: MTV Hits

MTV Pulse was a musical pop/rock television channel owned by MTV Networks France, launched in November 2005 only for France, dedicated to young adult (15–35 years) audience. MTV Pulse broadcast pop and rock music videos (also metal, punk, soul, alternative rock, etc.), live performances, interviews and special programs entirely dedicated to this musical universe.

The clips were broadcast in a more commercial format and from the currents of alternative music.

From April 9, 2013, the channel was available in HD.

MTV Pulse ceased broadcasting in France on 17 November 2015, along with MTV Base and MTV Idol, to be replaced by French version of MTV Hits and until the closing date of 31 December 2025.
