= 2015 in French television =

This is a list of French television related events from 2015.

== Events ==
- 27 January – Music group Bagad de Vannes win the 9th series of La France a un incroyable talent.
- 10 March – The Presidential Office confirms that three French sports personalities taking part in the reality television series Dropped were among 10 people killed in a helicopter crash in Argentina's La Rioja province the previous day. Yachtswoman Florence Arthaud, Olympic swimmer Camille Muffat and Olympic boxer Alexis Vastine were taking part in filming for the series at the time of the crash.
- 12 March – Emji wins the eleventh series of Nouvelle Star.
- 8–9 April – Hackers claiming to belong to the militant group Islamic State cause channels operated by TV5Monde to go off-air, and post material on its social media protesting against French military action in Iraq.
- 25 April – Lilian Renaud wins the fourth series of The Voice: la plus belle voix.
- 23 October – 14-year-old Jane Constance wins the second series of The Voice Kids.
- 13 November – Émilie Fiorelli wins the ninth series of Secret Story.
- 8 December – 19-year-old animal trainer Juliette Roux-Merveille and her dog Charlie win the tenth series of La France a un incroyable talent.
- 23 December – Singer and runner up of the third series of The Voice Belgique Loïc Nottet and his partner Denitsa Ikonomova win the sixth series of Danse avec les stars.

== Television shows ==
=== 1940s ===
- Le Jour du Seigneur (1949–present)

=== 1950s ===
- Présence protestante (1955–present)

=== 1970s ===
- 30 millions d'amis (1976–2016)

=== 2000s ===
- Nouvelle Star (2003–2010, 2012–2017)
- Plus belle la vie (2004–2022)
- La France a un incroyable talent (2006–present)
- Secret Story (2007–2017, 2024-present)

=== 2010s ===
- Danse avec les stars (2011–present)
- The Voice: la plus belle voix (2012–present)

== Networks and services ==
=== Launches ===
Network	Type	Launch date	Notes	Source
Trek	Cable television	2 February		
Science et Vie TV	Cable and satellite	30 March		
TV5 Monde Style	Cable and satellite	8 April		
BET	Cable and satellite	17 November		
MTV Hits	Cable and satellite	17 November		
Trace Gospel	Cable television	23 November		
Investigation Discovery	Cable and satellite	15 December		

=== Conversions and rebrandings ===
Old network name	New network name	Type	Conversion Date	Notes	Source
Escales	Trek	Cable and satellite	2 February		
Disney Cinemagic	Disney Cinema	Cable and satellite	8 May		

=== Closures ===
Network	Type	End date	Notes	Sources
M6 Music Black	Cable and satellite	5 January		
Encyclo	Cable and satellite	30 March		
Sport+	Cable and satellite	27 June		
MTV Idol	Cable and satellite	17 November		
MTV Pulse	Cable and satellite	17 November		

== Deaths ==
- Anne-Marie Peysson

== See also ==
- 2015 in France
- List of French films of 2015
