= MTV (Israeli TV channel) =

MTV Israel
- Country: Israel
- Broadcast area: Nationwide
- Headquarters: Tel Aviv, Israel

Programming
- Picture format: 16:9 576i SDTV (MTV Series); 1080i HDTV (MTV Music)

Ownership
- Owner: Ananey (Paramount Networks EMEAA)
- Sister channels: Hot Comedy Central; Nickelodeon; Nick Jr. TeenNick; MTV Hits; MTV 00s

History
- Launched: 17 January 2011; 15 years ago
- Replaced: MTV Europe

Links
- Website: http://www.mtv.co.il/

MTV Israel (Hebrew: MTV ישראל) is the Hebrew-language branch of the American channel of the same name. It launched on 17 January 2011.

== History ==
Prior to the launch of a 24-hour MTV Israel, the territory was previously served by a localised version of MTV Europe, which was introduced to the country in 1990. In the early 2000s, MTV started to localise the European MTV feed in Israel featuring localised advertising and sponsorship. MTV Networks International signed a deal with Tel Aviv-based telecommunications company Ananey Communications (currently owned by MTV's owner Paramount) to launch MTV Baltic during the negotiations Ananey showed interest in launching a local MTV channel in Israel. MTV Networks International launched an on-demand channel found at MTV.co.il. This service launched on 23 October 2007. MTV.co.il featured localised advertising, sponsorship and translated shows. The On-Demand Music & Entertainment channel launched on 23 October 2007. During this time, MTV Europe continued to be available in Israel on cable and satellite television, while MTV.co.il served as an interactive music service.

In 2008, MTV.co.il increased its localised programming featuring a local "MTV News" series and other music-based programming. The channel also features two local presenters. In November 2009, MTV Networks Europe and its associated partner within Israel, Ananey Communications have announced that a 24-hour, Hebrew-language channel will launch in the near future. It was expected that the channel will launch around late 2010 or early 2011. Ananey Communications recently hold a licensing agreement with MTV Networks Europe in relation to the local Nickelodeon within the region and promote other brands associated with MTV. MTV Networks International also host a localised version of Nickelodeon in Israel and promote other brands such as channel E!.

In January 2015, the channel was split in two: MTV Music, which only broadcasts music; and MTV Series which broadcasts general entertainment and reality programming. MTV Series is only available on HOT.

MTV Israel's First logo used from 17 January 2011 until 30 June 2011

MTV Israel's Second logo used from 1 July 2011 until 13 September 2021
