= Comedy Central (French TV channel) =

- Country: France
- Broadcast area: France, Switzerland

Programming
- Languages: French; English (some programs and continuity)
- Picture format: 1080i HDTV

Ownership
- Owner: Paramount Networks France
- Sister channels: MTV; Nickelodeon; Nickelodeon Junior; Nicktoons

History
- Launched: 4 October 2018; 7 years ago

Links
- Website: www.comedycentral.fr

Availability

Streaming media
- MyCanal: canalplus.com/live
- Molotov.tv: Watch live

Comedy Central is a French pay television channel based on the original namesake American channel operated by Paramount Networks France.

== History ==
Comedy Central was launched in France on 4 October 2018, along with the launch of a French digital content division for social medias, Viacom Digital Studios France.

On 8 October 2019, Comedy Central joined Canal+. It ceased satellite broadcast on 20 April 2022.

Comedy Central and Paramount Channel were launched in Belgium on 7 April 2020 on VOO, on 14 April on Telenet and on 1 January 2021 on Proximus.

== Programming ==
Comedy Central broadcast comedy shows and series. Comedy Central France premiered many Comedy Central shows in French, and offers many programmes in simulcast with the United States (The Daily Show, South Park, Crank Yankers...).

In mornings, Comedy Central used to air cartoons (Sanjay and Craig and Hey Arnold!). As of 2024, Comedy Central also airs shows during night-time (The World's Funniest Moments) and during most of the time a selection of series (Becker, zigby, Heroes of the City, Wakfu). Films are sometimes shown in evening.

=== Current programming ===
Sources:

- Awkwafina is Nora from Queens
- Becker
- Broad City
- Daria
- inspector Hamster
- Key & Peele
- The King of Queens
- Most Ridiculous
- Reno 911!
- zigby
- the boony tunes show
- Heroes of the City
- Wakfu

=== Former programming ===
- Brooklyn Nine-Nine
- Comedy Central Roast
- Crank Yankers
- The Daily Show
- Drawn Together
- Frasier
- The Fresh Prince of Bel-Air
- Hard Times
- Hey Arnold!
- How I Met Your Mother
- Nathan for You
- Punk'd
- Robot and Monster (also on Nickelodeon Junior)
- Sanjay and Craig
- Takeshi's Castle Indonesia
- Tosh.0
- Underemployed
- Un gars, une fille
- The World's Funniest Moments
- World's Funniest Videos
