= Ananey =

Israeli media company

Ananey (ענני), formerly Ananey Communications (ענני תקשורת) is an Israeli company founded by Udi Miron in 1996, and is currently owned by Skydance. The company owns 12 channels.

== History ==
Ananey Communications was founded by Udi Miron and Iris Hod after the ICP agreement broke the exclusivity contract between the cable companies (Matav, Golden Channels and Tevel) and the channels ICP produced (Arutz HaMishpaha, Arutz HaSport and Arutz HaYeladim. The Antitrust Court of Israel approved the split of the management, causing Noga to become the sole owner of Arutz HaYeladim and Channel 8 and ICP to keep its control of Arutz HaMishpaha and Arutz HaSratim. The remaining ICP channels, the ones that were sold, continued operations, but exclusively on cable companies.

In August 1999, Aviv Giladi acquired 25% of the company, which at the time owned Noga Communications. Giladi's entrance expected Ananey to expand its activities to other TV-related business areas, as well as their commercial derivatives. It also announced the arrival of international "superbrands" to be "packaged" into the Israeli market. Facing the expiry of the contract between Ananey-Noga and the cable companies, the company submitted an agreement on December 6, 2000 in order to save its staff (of 70) from being fired. The company was expected to open up its capital in 2006, considering an IPO for this purpose. By then it represented MTV, Discovery Channel and Nickelodeon in Israel. Per a Cable and Satellite Council directive, Aviv Giladi was forced to sell his shares on Ananey, as he owned shares of Channel 2.

The IPO was announced in May 2007, with a capital of NIS 80 million. The company was listed on June 13 and had increased its net profits by 41% by late August, but a fall of 11%. The fall was due to the cessation of production of Channel 10's Odette. It also reported a 7% fall in gains for the Ego channel. In January 2013, the company left the Tel Aviv Stock Exchange.

In April 2014, Sharon Lemberger and Orly Atlas Katz became the new CEOs, replacing Udi Miron.

=== Acquisition by ViacomCBS ===
On January 12, 2017, Viacom (later ViacomCBS) acquired a 25% stake in Ananey Communications, but had the option of acquiring its control. The agreement came at a time when multinationals were gradually taking over Israeli production companies, turning them into their subsidiaries. On April 6, 2020, ViacomCBS took over the entire company. Udi Miron continued as a special consultant and would also manage his new company, Gazella - New Media Experience.

== Assets ==
- Ananey Tech (previously Mars Interactive) was established in 2002 and develops interactive television applications for Yes and HOT. The company, which was joint-owned by Oberon Media, was acquired by Ananey in 2012. In 2021, it developed a quiz game based on the US series Friends.
- Post Office is a post-production house founded by Ilan Kedem and Chen Ravid. Ananey acquired the company in April 2008, its activities were reduced by 2018, most of its staff was laid off on August 1.

=== Ananey Studios ===
Ananey Studios (formerly Nutz Productions) is Ananey's production arm, established in 2010, led by executive producer Osnat Sarga. The company produces original content for Paramount's brands in Israel, as well as distributing in the local and global markets, either original productions or formats. In 2010, it sold its travel documentary series Market Values to BBC channels in Asia. In January 2016, Netflix acquired the rights of The Greenhouse and between 2017 and 2018, it inked deals with European broadcasters to carry Schhuna (The Hood), whose second season was airing on RTP2 in January 2018.

== International activities ==
Throughout the years, the company has expanded its businesses outside of Israel. In 2007, it launched a children's channel on Boom in Romania, which featured a 300-hour content agreement from Cookie Jar and a 100-hour agreement from Viacom, as well as local programming produced by Ananey for the Romanian market. In June 2008, it acquired UAB MTV Networks Baltic (MTVNB), a company which oversaw the localized MTV channels in the Baltics, for the sum of NIS 3 million. In August 2009, it launched a karaoke channel in the Netherlands on UPC. Ananey also owned The Karaoke Channel's original version on HOT and Yes and operated foreign versions with partners. In February 2011, it signed an international co-operation agreement with Hebei Television. The agreement envisioned one of HEBTV's travel series, Hello, My Love, to air on Ananey's travel channel, while Ananey's Places to Be would air on one of HEBTV's channels. It was also a landmark agreement for the Chinese market, becoming the first Israeli lifestyle program produced by an Israeli production company to air on a Chinese television channel.

== Channels ==
=== Skydance brands ===
- Nickelodeon
- TeenNick
- Nick Jr.
- MTV
- MTV Music
- MTV 00s
- MTV Hits

=== Lifestyle channels ===
- The Good Life Channel
- The Food Channel
- The Travel Channel
- The Health Channel
- Ego
- Travel+ (Cellcom TV+)
- Good Life+ (Cellcom TV+)

=== Former linear channels ===
- Game One (shut down 2006)
- Ego Total (shut down 2021)
- Comedy Central (shut down 2022)
- Health+ (shut down 2024)
- Food+ (shut down 2025)
- CNBC (distribution rights)
- MSNBC (distribution rights, ended 2016)
- Second tender for the Arabic channel in 2004, which eventually became the current Hala TV

=== Former interactive services developed by Ananey Tech ===
- TJ Portal
- Super Kid Portal
- Gogo
- Gogo Club
- Gogo Gold
- HOT Games Channel
- Who Wants To Be a Millionaire?
- Hop! Learning
- Logi (interactive service)
- Nick School
- Arutz HaYeladim Plus
- Disney Games Channel
- Vegas Channel
- Ego Games
- Playboy Games
- The Karaoke Channel
- HOT Album
- The Shopping Channel
- Psychometry Channel

== TV series ==
=== Pre-school series ===
- Craft Party (2017)
- Rescue Team (2017-2023)
- Walla Koala (2020)
- Marshmallow Legends (2020)
- Bonbon Restaurant (2020-2024)

=== Kids series ===
- Greenhouse Academy (2012)
- The Hood (2014)
- Kadabra (2017)
- Beit Sefer (2019)
- Spyders (2020)
- Palmach (2020)
- The Last Floor (2020)
- Sky (2021)
- On Our Own (2021)
- Golda and Meir (2022)
- Ronnie and Tom (2023)
