= 2015 in France =

- Decades: 1990s; 2000s; 2010s; 2020s; 2030s
- See also: History of France; Timeline of French history; List of years in France

The following lists events that happened in 2015 in France.

== Incumbents ==
- President – François Hollande (Socialist)
- Prime Minister – Manuel Valls (Socialist)

== Events ==
=== January ===
- January 6 – Former Prime Minister Lionel Jospin enters the Constitutional Council.
- January 7 – Gunmen kill 12 people at the headquarters of Charlie Hebdo in Paris.
- January 8 – One of the suspects in the killings, Hamyd Mourad, voluntarily surrenders to police at Charleville-Mézières while the other two suspects are still at large.
- January 9 – Gunshots are reported in Dammartin-en-Goele as a manhunt continues for two suspects nearby.
- January 9 – A hostage situation occurs at a Jewish market, Hypercacher, in the eastern Paris suburb of Vincennes. There are two suspected hostage takers, Hayat Boumeddiene, 26, and Amedy Coulibaly, 32, who were previously suspected of shooting a policewoman dead earlier in the week. There were at least sixteen hostages. The standoff ends with Coulibaly dead as well as four hostages. Four additional hostages and two police officers require hospitalization. Boumeddiene remains at large.

=== February ===
- February 9 – Hooded gunmen attack French police in the city of Marseille, which Prime Minister Manuel Valls is due to visit.

=== March ===
- March 9 – Villa Castelli helicopter collision: Two helicopters collide over Western Argentina, killing 10 people, including three French sports stars.
- March 22 – Voters in France go to the polls for the first round of voting in local government elections. Exit polls show the conservative UMP in first place, Marine Le Pen's National Front in second, with President Francois Hollande's French Socialist Party in third.
- March 24 – A Germanwings flight carrying 144 passengers and six crew crashes en route from Barcelona, Spain, to Düsseldorf, Germany, in a mountainous region of the Alps near Digne-les-Bains in Southern France. All on board are dead.

=== April ===
- April 16 – Vladimir Putin wants France to refund Russia for Mistral warships. The deal for these warships may not go through because of the Russo-Ukrainian war
- April 19 – Sid Ahmed Ghlam, a 24-year-old Algerian student, is arrested in Paris on suspicion of plotting a terrorist attack on one or more churches as well as for the killing of Aurélie Châtelain.
- April 22 – President François Hollande says he will refund Russia for the Mistral warships if the deal falls through
- April 30 – Qatar buys 24 Rafale fighter jets from France, paying about 6.3 billion euros (or 7.05 million US dollars). Qatar is in search of military power due to instability in the Middle Eastern region. They are fearful of recent conflict in Yemen, Syria, and Libya, as well as the growing power of Iran. The deal also "includes MBDA missiles, and the training of 36 Qatari pilots and 100 technicians by the French army". France's arms exports are now at 15 billion euros for this year.

=== May ===
- May 4 – Gilles Le Guen, who is accused of working with a branch of Al-Queda in North Africa, goes into trial in Paris. He is the first person to go on trial for a new anti-terrorism law that was passed in 2012. This law "allows French prosecutors to go after citizens who are suspected of participating in terrorist acts on foreign soil, or who have left the country to receive terrorist training."
- May 6 – The French parliament passes a bill that gives power to intelligence services to do things such as tap cell phones and read emails. Intelligence services can use these powers "while bypassing the judiciary". The point of this bill is to protect France from security threats. The bill has raised questions about privacy of the French people
- May 7
  - A French family is trapped in Portuguese water after their ship capsizes near the mid-Atlantic Azores islands. The six-year-old girl of the family dies of hypothermia after being stranded in 21 degree Celsius water for 7 hours. The rest of the family was rescued by a Spanish hospital ship.
  - Wiretaps of Nicolas Sarkozy (head of the UMP) were approved by a French court to be used as evidence. These wiretappings would likely be used against Sarkozy in a corruption case against him. Sarkozy's phones were first bugged "over allegations that he accepted illicit payments from L'Oréal heiress Liliane Bettencourt for his 2007 presidential campaign, much of it in cash-filled envelopes." The recordings entail conversations between Sarkozy and his lawyer. This case is seen as a threat to Sarkozy's recent "political comeback".
  - The state prosecutor of France confirms that judges in France will investigate rape allegations against French peacekeepers in Bangui, Central African Republic. The allegations come from six children between the ages of 9 and 13, claiming that fourteen French soldiers raped them in exchange for food between December 2013 and June 2014.

=== June ===
- June 7 – The 2015 French Open tennis tournament concludes at Stade Roland Garros. Stan Wawrinka wins the Men's Singles title, and Serena Williams the Ladies' Singles.
- June 26 – "Vendredi Noir": At Saint-Quentin-Fallavier, near Lyon, a French Muslim, Yassin Salhi, murders his employer Hervé Cornara and drives a van into gas cylinders at a factory, causing an explosion.

=== July ===
- July 26 – The 2015 Tour de France concludes in Paris, and is won by Chris Froome of Team Sky, the first British rider to win the Tour twice.

=== August ===
- August 21 – An attempted mass shooting occurred on board a Thalys train on its way to Paris from Amsterdam. Four people including the assailant were injured but no fatalities were reported. Three Americans and one British person, who all helped to subdue the gunmen, were made Knights of the Legion of Honour (Chevaliers de la Légion d'honneur) by President François Hollande.

=== October ===
- October 12 – Jean-Jacques Hyest enters the Constitutional Council.

=== November ===
- November 13 – Terrorist attacks rip through France with as many as 130 people reported to be dead. The Islamic State claims responsibility of the shooting.

=== December ===
- December 25 – A Muslim prayer hall is ransacked in Ajaccio, Corsica during a series of protests by Corsican nationalists.

=== General ===
The penetration rate of the mobile phone in French Republic is around 107-109%.

== Deaths ==
=== January ===
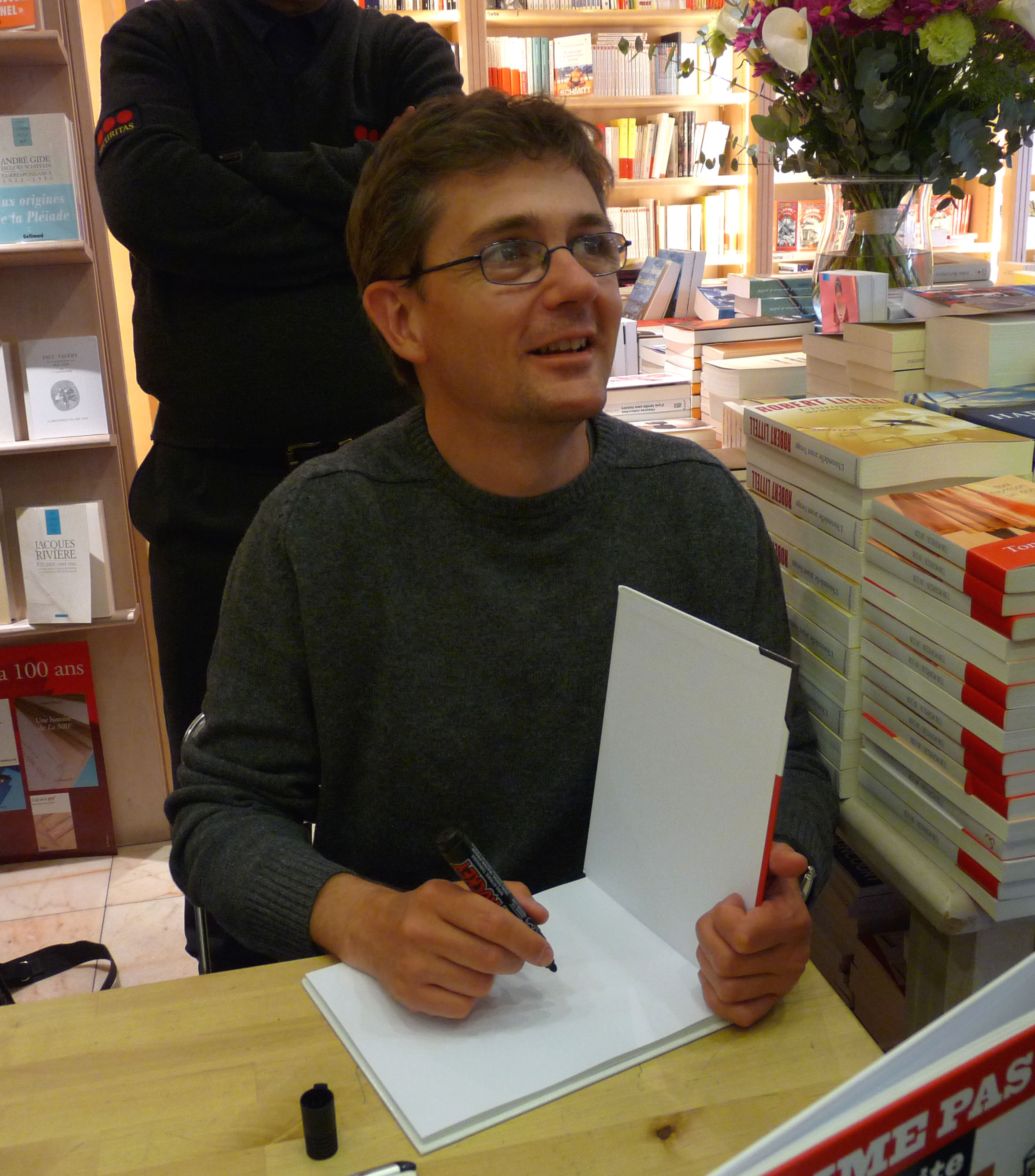
Charb

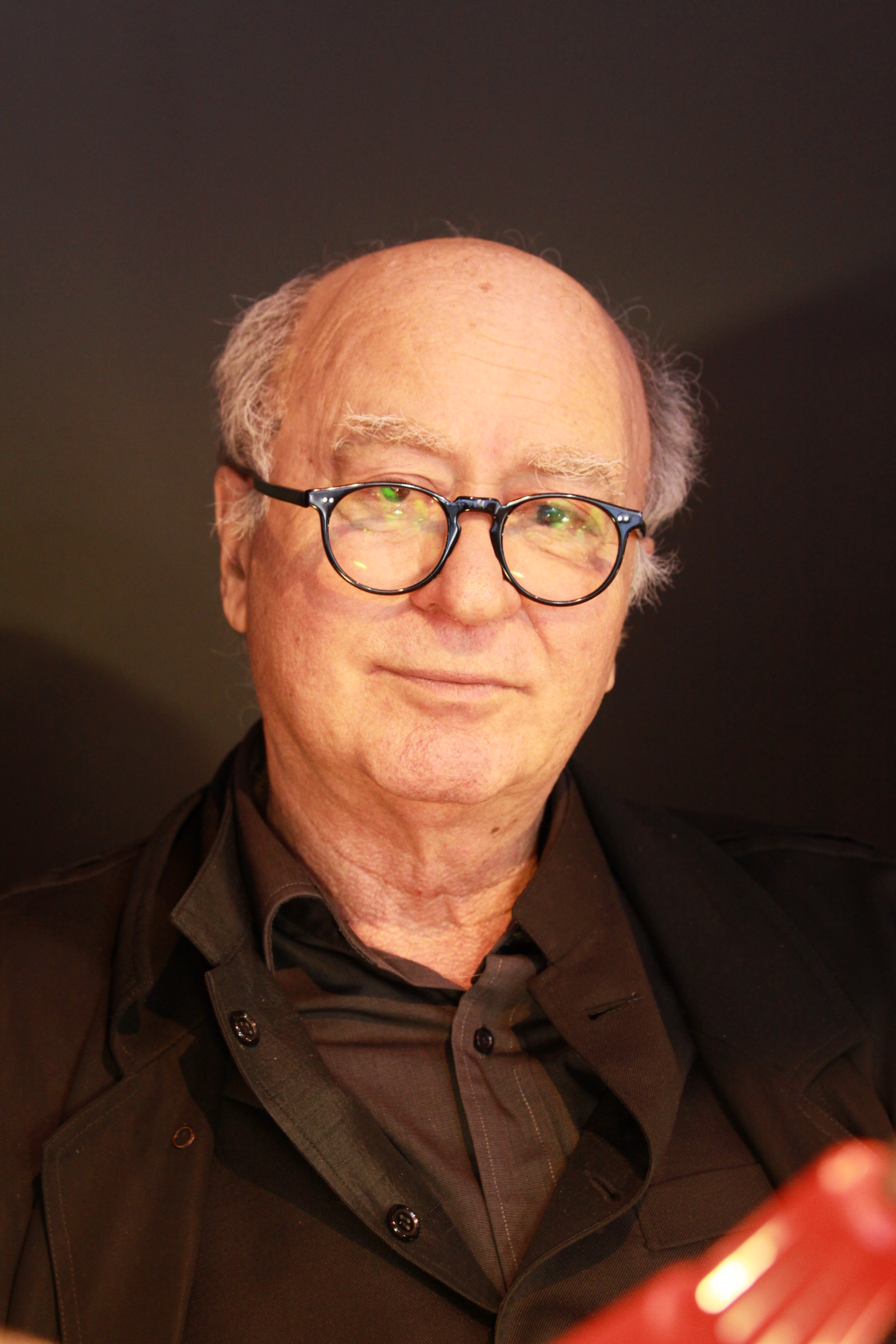
Georges Wolinski

- January 1 – Géry Leuliet, Roman Catholic prelate (b. 1910)
- January 2
  - Charles Baur, politician (b. 1929)
  - Maurice Fontaine, politician (b. 1919)
- January 4 – Ives Roqueta, Occitan author (b. 1936)
- January 5 – Jean-Pierre Beltoise, racing driver (b. 1937)
- January 7
  - Cabu, cartoonist (b. 1938)
  - Elsa Cayat, psychoanalyst and columnist (b. 1960)
  - Charb, cartoonist and journalist (b. 1967)
  - Philippe Honoré, cartoonist (b. 1941)
  - Bernard Maris, economist and journalist (b. 1946)
  - Mustapha Ourrad, Algerian-born French copy editor (b. 1954)
  - Tignous, cartoonist (b. 1957)
  - Georges Wolinski, cartoonist (b. 1934)
- January 9
  - Amedy Coulibaly, Islamic Jihadist (b. 1982)
  - Chérif and Saïd Kouachi, Islamic Jihadists (b. 1980 and 1982)
  - Christian Vanneque, sommelier and restaurateur (b. 1949)
- January 15 – Jean-Claude Baker, French-born American restaurateur (b. 1943)
- January 16 – Patrick Journoud, athlete (b. 1964)
- January 20 – Wilfride Piollet, ballerina and choreographer (b. 1943)
- January 24 – Robert Bonnaventure, cyclist (b. 1920)
- January 25 – Pierre Gosnat, politician (b. 1948)
- January 28 – Yves Chauvin, Belgian-French Nobel chemist (b. 1930)

=== February ===
- February 1 – Aldo Ciccolini, Italian-French pianist (b. 1925)
- February 6 – Assia Djebar, Algerian writer (b. 1936)
- February 10
  - Corinne Le Poulain, actress (b. 1948)
  - Bernard Marie, rugby league referee and politician (b. 1918)
- February 12 – Désiré Dondeyne, composer (b. 1921)
- February 14
  - Louis Jourdan, actor (b. 1921)
  - Philippe Massoni, prefect (b. 1936)
- February 17 – Henri Martin, political activist (b. 1927)
- February 19 – Gérard Ducarouge, Formula One car designer (b. 1941)
- February 20 – Gérard Calvi, French film score composer (b. 1922)
- February 25 – Thérèse Aillaud, politician (b. 1931)

=== March ===
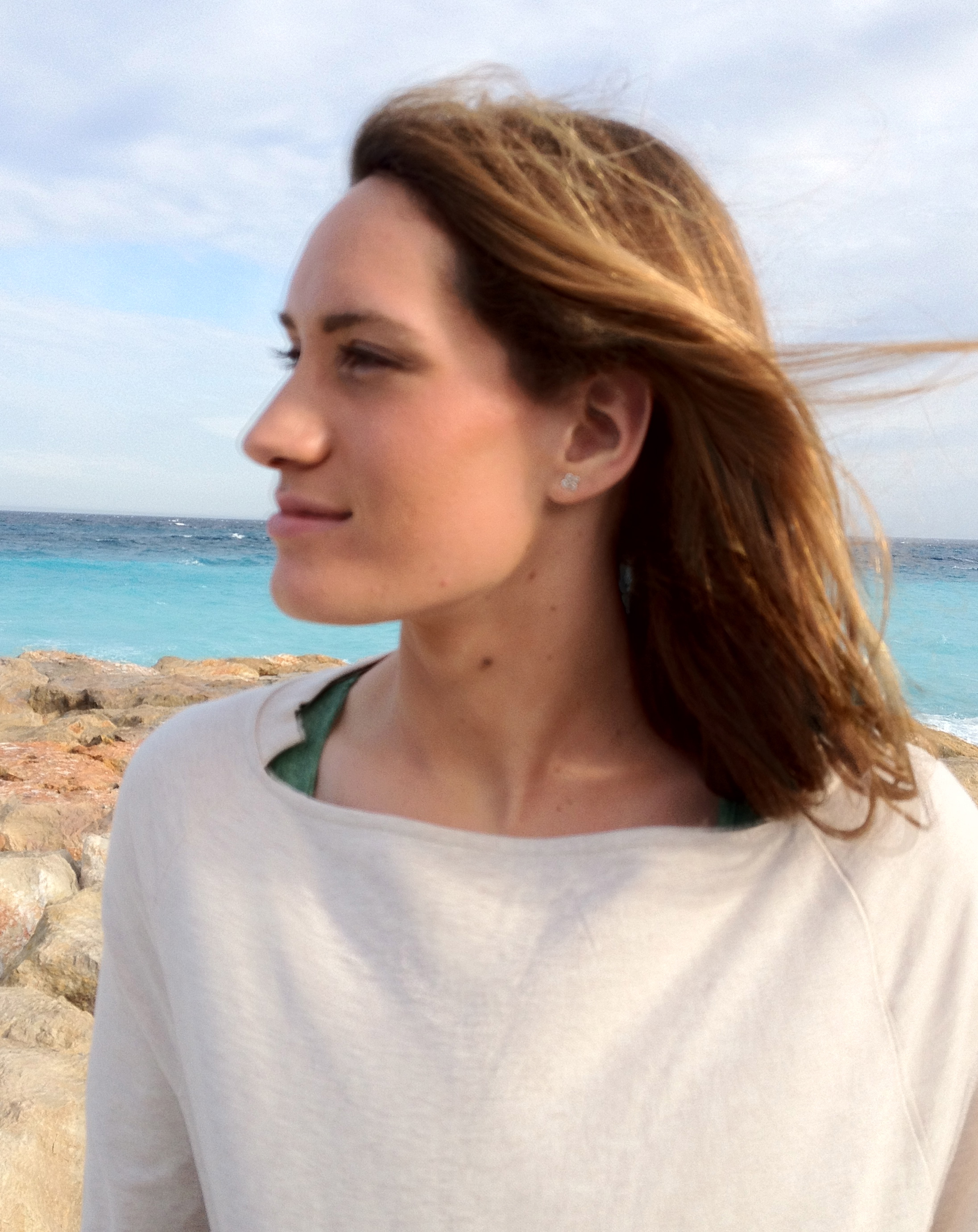
Camille Muffat

- March 2 – Bettina Graziani, 89, fashion model (b. 1925)
- March 3
  - André Brulé, 93, racing driver (b. 1922)
  - Gilles Cistac, 43, French-Mozambican human rights lawyer (b. 1961)
- March 9
  - Florence Arthaud, 57, sailor (b. 1957)
  - Camille Muffat, 25, swimmer (b. 1989)
  - Alexis Vastine, 28, boxer (b. 1986)
- March 24
  - Oleg Bryjak, 54, Kazakh-German opera singer (b. 1960)
  - Maria Radner, 33, German opera singer (b. 1981)
  - Victims of crash of Germanwings Flight 9525

=== April ===
- April 9 – Nina Companeez, 77, screenwriter and film director (b. 1937)
- April 19 – Aurélie Châtelain, 32, fitness instructor.

=== May ===
- May 10 - Rachel Rosenthal, 88, French-American actress and dancer (b. 1926)
- May 17 - Claude Carliez, 90, French fencer and stuntman (b. 1925)

=== July ===
- July 17 - Jules Bianchi, 25, racing driver (b. 1989)

=== December ===
- December 23 – Jean-Marie Pelt, 82, biologist (b. 1933)

== See also ==
- 2015 in French television
- 2015 Île-de-France attacks
- List of French films of 2015
- 2015 in the European Union
