= Les Jardins de l'Empereur =

Human settlement in France

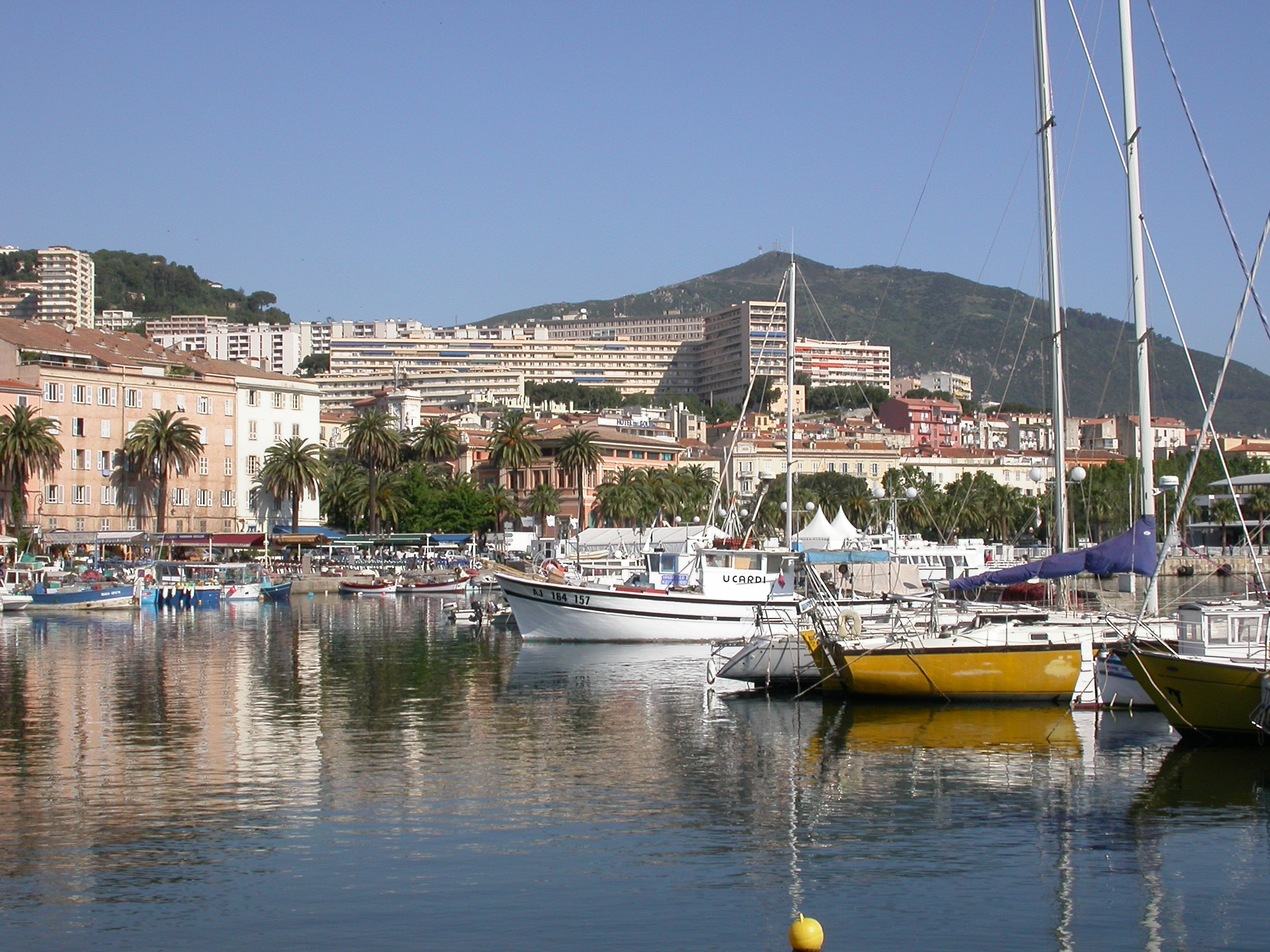
View of the port of Ajaccio. The modern buildings in the background are Les Jardins de l'Empereur.

Les Jardins de l'Empereur (literally, "The Emperor's Gardens") is a neighbourhood of Ajaccio, Corsica, France. The neighbourhood has been described as a banlieue and is classed as a sensitive urban zone (ZUS). The majority of its inhabitants are foreign, of which North Africans predominate. The neighbourhood made national and international headlines due to violent unrest in December 2015, after which programmes were initiated to improve it.

== Profile ==
According to the French bureau of statistics INSEE, the neighbourhood had a 10.6% unemployment rate in 2006 as compared to 9.8% for the city as a whole. The median household income was €13,009, the lowest of the four vulnerable neighbourhoods profiled, and nearly half as much as the €24,567 average for the city. In 2006, 10.7% of the population qualified for subsidised healthcare (CMU-C) the second highest rate of the four profiled neighbourhoods and compared to the 8.3% average.

In 2018, the neighbourhood had a population of 2,200, including Corsicans, North Africans and Portuguese people. In December 2020, Les Echos profiled the neighbourhood as having 1,700 residents in 480 households, of which the majority were homeowners and also of foreign nationality. The principal buildings are named after members of the local House of Bonaparte.

== Unrest and subsequent programmes ==
The neighbourhood made national and international headlines on 24 December 2015 when police and firefighters were attacked when responding to a call, by hooded men who said "Corses de merde, vous n'êtes pas chez vous!" (Corsican shits, you are not in your land!). In response, hundreds of Corsicans marched on the neighbourhood and other areas of high Arab population, calling for Arabs to leave the city and vandalising sites including a Muslim prayer room.

In November 2015, the neighbourhood was included in a nationwide programme to improve disadvantaged areas with renovation and infrastructure, and the following January a Citizens' Council was established. In April 2018, the Minister of Territorial Development, Jacques Mézard, visited the neighbourhood. While households had been sold cheaply to escape the neighbourhood following the 2015 unrest, by the fifth anniversary of the violence, a three-room apartment had nearly doubled in value from €80,000 to €150,000.
