= Ego (TV channel) =

Israeli television channel

EGO

Ownership
- Owner: Ananey Communications

History
- Launched: 2002
- Closed: 31 December 2021

Ego Channel is an Israeli men's interest channel owned by Ananey which started broadcasting in 2002. It had a sister channel, Ego Total, which shut down in 2021.

== History ==
The anticipation campaign for its launch was released on February 19, 2002, and was conceived by Ananey subsidiary Zoe. This consisted of four 15-second spots parodying the titles to the James Bond movie franchise presenting situations related to its four core programming segments: money, action (extreme lifestyle), toys (gadgets) and emotions (softcore eroticism). A 30-second revelation promo introduced the channel as a whole. The channel was priced at 10 shekels on digital cable and would offer a free preview to potential subscribers in its first year.

The channel launched in April 2002 and had a strong interactive component. In its early years, its director was Tali Pink. Under the slogan "A channel to tell guys", it was initially perceived as an erotic channel, which Pink denied. Erotic content occupied one third of its programming, as "emotional programming". The two other sections were cars and action programming. Pink told Globes in 2005 that she received foreign material, surprising colleagues.

The channel gained the rights to Family Business in 2004, about a Jewish-American porn actor. In May 2005, the channel announced that, from the following month, it would start airing 3-4 minute videos produced by the IDF's road safety unit, featuring stories of people who suffered traffic accidents or family members of people deceased in such situations. On October 2, it added a new primetime strand dedicated to the "new man", catering fitness, lifestyle, personal care, metrosexuality and related topics, as well as G4's program Pulse.

In 2006, the channel merged with Game One and added content related to video games.

On June 28, 2010, the channel carried the first televised broadcast of semi-finals and the final of the Israeli Billiard Championship for nine-ball pool.
