= Heroes of the City =

- Genre: Action; Adventure; Preschool
- Created by: Ruta Ett
- Written by: Anne D. Bernstein; Daniel Edfeldt; Elin Ferner; Peter K. Hirsch; Jymn Magon; Mike Setaro; Dave Benjoya; Eric Shaw; Joe Vitale; Mike de Sève; Karen de Sève
- Directed by: Pelle Ferner
- Voices of: Fiona Ash; Jennie Kirk; Joyce Jones; Andrew Pushkin; Lisa Hanam; James Williams; Oscar Teare; Thomas Fuller; Erik Stredwick; Jon Milward; Rachel Redfern; Dave Jolly
- Composer: Joakim Karlsson
- Country of origin: Sweden
- Original languages: Swedish; English
- No. of seasons: 2
- No. of episodes: 52

Production
- Executive producer: Pelle Ferner (season 1)
- Producer: Pelle Ferner (season 2)
- Editor: Pelle Ferner
- Running time: 11 minutes
- Production companies: Ruta Ett DVD AB; Your Family Entertainment (season 1)

Original release
- Network: Cartoon Network Sweden
- Release: 1 June 2012 – 29 December 2014

Heroes of the City (Swedish: Stadens Hjältar) is a Swedish computer-animated television series for preschool children, with stories about friendship, sharing and caring. The plots revolve around the emergency vehicles Paulie Police Car and Fiona Fire Engine who tackle a new mission in each episode.

Heroes of the City was created in Sweden in 2009, and was broadcast in over 70 countries. Season 1 was written by Swedish screenwriters, Season 2 mainly by American screenwriters.

It was presented as "Sweden's first 3D animated TV series".

== Production credits ==
=== Season 1 (2012) ===
- Production: Ruta Ett DVD AB
- Executive producer: Pelle Ferner
- Creative consultant: Lennart Blixt
- Voice recording: Hippeis Media
- Music: Joakim Karlsson
- Soundeffects: Elin Ferner
- Editing: Pelle Ferner
- Actors: Fiona Ash, Jennie Kirk, Joyce Jones, Andrew Pushkin, Lisa Hanam, James Williams, Oscar Teare, Thomas Fuller, Erik Stredwick, Jon Milward, Rachel Redfern and Dave Jolly
- Heroes of the city was created by: Ruta Ett DVD AB
- Director: Pelle Ferner
- Script writer: Elin Ferner
- Storyboard: Carolina Årnäs
- Art director: Mattias Wennerfalk
- Animation
  - Executive Producer: Shambhoo Phalke
  - Animation Director: Rahul Patil
  - Production Manager: Rakesh Tatia
  - Production Executive: Sonal Aswale
  - Animation Team Lead: Krishnaparasad CT
  - Reliance Media Works Ltd
- Ruta ett DVD-PRODUKTION, Your Family Entertainment (credited as yourfamily entertainment)
- © Ruta Ett DVD AB 2012

=== Season 2 (2014) ===
- Heroes of the City is created by Ruta Ett DVD AB
- Producer and director: Pelle Ferner
- Art director: Mattias Wennerfalk
- Storyboard, modeling and textures: Mattias Wennerfalk, Carolina Årnäs, Anton Kirkhoff, Andrea Forsgren
- Editing: Pelle Ferner
- Title graphics: Sara Berntsson
- Marketing and sales: Lennart Blixt
- Business developer: Erik Foberg
- Script: Baboon Animation
- Writers: Joe Vitale, Anne D. Bernstein (credited as Anne Bernstein), Mike Setaro, Dave Benjoya, Mike de Sève, Jymn Magon, Karen de Sève, Peter K. Hirsch (credited as Peter Hirsch), Eric Shaw, Elin Ferner
- Story editors: Mike de Seve, Elin Ferner
- Animations: Reliance Media Works Ltd
- Animation director: Rahul Patil
- Animation co-ordinator: Vilas Rane
- Animators: Sagar Kadam, Pankaj Kashid, Roshan Bagul, Gautam Prasad, Amit Sharma, Abhay Bansude
- SFX and rig: Sanjay Kamble, Chirag Parmar, Gyandeep Das
- Voice recording: Audioworks Producers Group
- Voice director: Mike de Seve
- Voice consultant: Kip Kaplan
- Music: Joakim Karlsson
- Sound effects and mixing: Elin Ferner
- Ruta ett DVD-PRODUKTION
- © Ruta Ett DVD AB 2014
- Heroes of the City home page: www.hotc.nu

== Characters ==
- Paulie Police Car - A Police car.
- Fiona Fire Engine - A Fire engine.
- Calamity Crow - A Crow who is the must unluckiest citizen.
- Alice - A Megaphone who reports emergencies.

== Series overview ==
Episodes (Season 1)	Episodes (Season 2)
1. The Treasure Map	1. Better Business Buddies
2. The Hot Air Balloon	2. Alice's Alarm
3. The Train Adventure	3. Trading Places
4. Camping Troubles	4. Hero Helper
5. The Garbage Party	5. The Wild Goof Chase
6. The Big Concert	6. Luck Be a Crow
7. Fisherman Fred in Troubled Waters	7. The Wrong Side of the Tracks
8. The Water Mystery	8. Mail Mixup
9. The Mysterious Thief	9. Mayors Mission
10. Fiona's Day Off	10. The Seamonster
11. Calamity Crow's Unlucky Day	11. Walking the Prank
12. Tiger on the Loose	12. Monster Truck
13. The Airplane That Disappeared	13. Backseat Driver
14. Ghost Car	14. Percy Postponed
15. Wacky Wayne Comes to Town	15. One Hundred Cats
16. The Hungry Crocodile	16. Robbie's Upgrade
17. Stormy Weather	17. Police Farce
18. Friends Forever	18. Best City Ever
19. Harry's Dangerous Pranks	19. Garden Grabber
20. The Secret Box	20. Digsy Helps Out
21. Movie Maker	21. The Secret Club
22. The Ice-Cream Stall Is on Fire	22. The Oilcan
23. The Missing Treasure	23. The Talent Show
24. Cara and the Mini Circus	24. Laugh In
25. The Forgotten Birthday	25. The Most Helpful Citizen
26. The Race	26. Fake, Rattle and Roll
