= Paramount Network (Czech Republic) =

- Country: Czech Republic
- Broadcast area: Czech Republic
- Network: Paramount Network

Programming
- Picture format: 1080i HDTV (downscaled to 16:9 576i for the SDTV feed)

Ownership
- Owner: Paramount Networks EMEAA
- Sister channels: MTV; Club MTV; MTV Hits; MTV Live; MTV 80s MTV 90s MTV 00s Nickelodeon; Nick Jr. Nicktoons

History
- Launched: 14 December 2015; 10 years ago (as Prima Comedy Central); 12 January 2021; 5 years ago (as Paramount Network)
- Closed: December 31, 2025; 8 months ago
- Former names: Prima Comedy Central (2015–2021)

Links
- Website: www.paramountnetwork.cz

Availability

Terrestrial
- DVB-T/T2: MUX 24 (FTA)

Paramount Network (originally Prima Comedy Central) was a Czech television channel operated by the American media concern Paramount International Media Networks (in the Czech Republic it also broadcasts, for example, MTV, VH1, Nickelodeon or Comedy Central Extra). The channel was launched on 14 December 2015 at 15:00 under the name Prima Comedy Central. It broadcasts 24 hours a day. On January 12, 2021, the station changed its name to Paramount Network, and films from Paramount Pictures were added to the broadcast.

== Programming ==
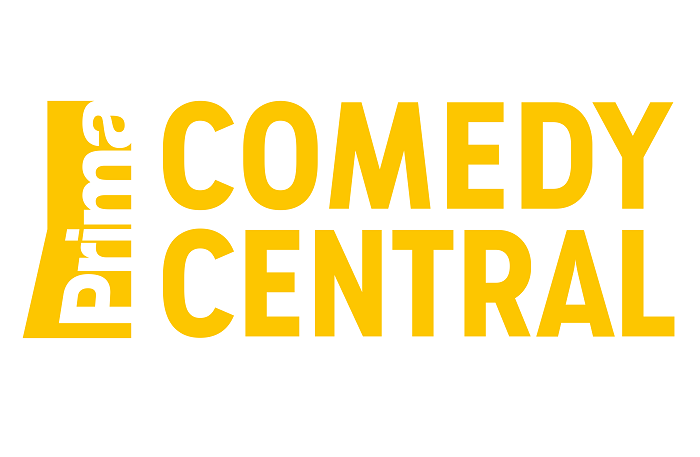
Prima Comedy Central logo

The channel's line-up started with comedy series, such as Family Guy, South Park, New Girl, The Middle, According to Jim, Modern Family, SpongeBob SquarePants, Teenage Mutant Ninja Turtles. From April 25, 2016, it also included the original stand-up show Comedy Club in its program. Following the 2021 rebrand, non-comedy titles were added.

=== final program ===
- Comedy Club
- CSI: Crime Scene Investigation
- Elementary
- Kung Fu Panda: Legends of Awesomeness
- The Penguins of Madagascar
- Police Interceptors
- Red Dwarf
- SpongeBob SquarePants

=== Former series ===
- According to Jim
- The Adventures of Jimmy Neutron, Boy Genius
- American Dad!
- Back at the Barnyard
- Beavis and Butt-Head
- Breadwinners
- Family Guy
- The Goldbergs
- Hawaii Five-0
- The Middle
- The Mighty B!
- Modern Family
- New Girl
- Sanjay and Craig
- Scrubs
- South Park
- Teenage Mutant Ninja Turtles
- T.U.F.F. Puppy
- Yellowstone
