= Nickelodeon (Serbian TV channel) =

- Logo used since 2023 (Note: The logo's wordmark has been in use since 2010. Additionally, this logo is a variant meant to be used for white backgrounds; the main variant has a white wordmark in conjunction with a fully orange splat.)
- Country: Serbia
- Broadcast area: Serbia; Montenegro; North Macedonia; Bosnia and Herzegovina

Programming
- Language: Serbian
- Picture format: HDTV 1080i (downscaled to 576i for the SD feed)

Ownership
- Owner: Paramount Networks EMEAA
- Parent: Nickelodeon Group

History
- Launched: 28 April 2013

Links
- Website: Official website

Nickelodeon (Serbian: Nickelodeon Srbija) is the Serbian version of Nick, launched on April 28, 2013 along with the Slovenian-language version of Nick. It broadcasts in Serbia, North Macedonia, Bosnia and Herzegovina and Montenegro. All animated and live-action shows are dubbed into the Serbian. Dubs are made by Gold Digi Net studio, but the channel also airs some dubs made by B92, Happy TV, Ideogram and Loudworks. The channel broadcasts 24/7. The Serbian version of channel is served by the Pan-European version of Nick.
