= Nickelodeon (Slovenian TV channel) =

- Country: Slovenia

Programming
- Language: Slovenian
- Picture format: HDTV 1080i (downscaled to 576i for the SD feed)

Ownership
- Owner: Paramount Networks EMEAA
- Parent: Nickelodeon Group

History
- Launched: April 28, 2013

Links
- Website: www.nick.com/global

Nickelodeon, often shortened to Nick is a Slovenian television channel. It is served by the pan-European feed. It launched on April 28, 2013, along with Nickelodeon (Serbia).
