= 2015 Corsican protests =

2015 violent clashes in Corsica

- Date: 24–28 December 2015
- Location: Ajaccio, Corsica, France (Initially in Les Jardins de l'Empereur area); 41°55′36″N 8°44′13″E
- Methods: Protests, rioting, arson, vandalism
- Result: Muslim prayer centre damaged, vandalism of property

Parties
European rioters: Nationalists	Corsican police	North African residents

Casualties
- Death: 0
- Injuries: 0
- Detained: Six North African men sentenced to between 6 and 30 months in prison for initial attack.
- Ban on protests declared effective until 4 January 2016, yet protests continued.

The 2015 Corsican protests were a series of marches by several hundred Corsican nationalists that began on 25 December, in Ajaccio, capital of Corsica. During the initial demonstrations, a Muslim prayer hall was burned down and Qur'ans were set alight. Further protests were organised after the initial march despite a government ban on protests until 4 January 2016. The protesters claimed to be acting in revenge for an incident that occurred the day prior when firefighters and police were assaulted in the neighbourhood of Les Jardins de l'Empereur; however, outside observers labeled the ensuing riots as anti-Arab and anti-Muslim. The Corsican nationalist politicians have claimed their view does not legitimise xenophobia, blaming the protest on French nationalism instead. Scholarly opinions on this claim are divided.

== Background ==
Over the past several decades, Corsican nationalists have been calling for the island's recognition as a nation since French annexation. Following years of violence by the FLNC (stopped in 2014), a referendum on increased devolution failed by a narrow majority. The Corsican language is also labeled as a "definitely endangered language" by UNESCO.

While racial tensions linger, in the December 2015 French regional elections in Corsica, the pro-autonomy party Pè a Corsica got 35.34% of the vote, winning 24 seats out of 51. Gilles Simeoni, already mayor of Bastia, said: "It's a victory for Corsica and all the Corsicans. My first thoughts go to all those early campaigners who have battled for our cause for half a century – among them the youngsters, some of whom are in prison. It's a victory for an alternative policy to that which has failed Corsicans for decades. [Corsicans had a] thirst for democracy, economic development and social justice." The leader of the pro-independence group Corsica Libera, Jean-Guy Talamoni, added: "It's been a 40-year-long march to arrive here. Corsica is not just a French administrative constituency – it's a country, a nation, a people." He further noted the result of "those who have never accepted French rule... and have never ceased to fight for the survival of the Corsican nation" and also called for amnesty for "political prisoners" and "those still in hiding."

Negotiations were imminent for the creation of a single Corsican region by 2018 that would merge the executive with its two départements. Republicans leader Nicolas Sarkozy said before the vote that "Mr Talamoni does not want the French Republic? Well, the French Republic does not want Mr Talamoni. This is France." Following the election, the former FLNC's Jean-Pierre Susini said: "This is the culmination of 40 years of struggle. I have always called for independence but after 200 years of (French) colonialism...the nationalists have an enormous amount of work to do." He added: "We have only two years before us. We must not disappoint, otherwise the valets of colonialism will take back control." The election was said to play a part in the rise of nationalist sentiment.

== Arson and protests ==
On 24 December in the poor neighbourhood of Les Jardins de l'Empereur, firefighters were ambushed by unidentified "hooded youths" with iron bars and baseball bats, resulting in injuries to two firefighters and a police officer. A local official, François Lalanne, said a fire was deliberately lit in the area and when the emergency services arrived they were attacked. An unnamed fireman said that about 20 men tried to break the windows of their truck with bars and bats. According to Corse Matin, the firefighters were told "Sales Corses de merde, cassez-vous, vous n'êtes pas chez vous ici!" (Dirty shitty Corsicans, go fuck yourselves, you are not in your home here!). On 25 December, a Muslim prayer hall in Les Jardins de l'Empereur was burned with at least part of a Quran set on fire. It was raided by crowds the next day after accusations that the firefighters were attacked by local Arab residents.

On 27 December, following the initial arson, as well as a consequent protest ban, several hundred people marched in Corsica, though they avoided the affected neighbourhood, instead rallying in other areas. Previous marches had seen slogans such as : "Arabs get out!" On the day, they also rejected accusations that their rally was racist and chanted: "We fight against scum, not against Arabs!" and "We aren't thugs, we aren't racists!" Police were also deployed around Les Jardins de l'Empereur, home to many immigrants, to prevent any clashes.

== Arrests ==
Two men in their 20s were arrested for the initial attack and were due to be charged.

In December 2018, six men were sentenced for their part in the initial attack: Nabil Khallouk and Aziz Doudouch received 30 months in prison, Christian Richard received two years, and Karim Khallouk received 18 months. Nordine Doudouch got 10 months in prison for transporting weapons, and Abdelkarim El Youssfi received a six-month suspended sentence and community service for trespassing and vandalism.

== Reactions ==
=== Politics ===
Prime Minister Manuel Valls said the attack was "an unacceptable desecration," while Interior Minister Bernard Cazeneuve pledged that the perpetrators of the attacks on the firefighters and the prayer hall would be identified and arrested. He further commented that there was no place for "racism and xenophobia" in France. The French Council of the Muslim Faith denounced the violence. A ban was issued on protests in the mostly Muslim neighbourhood until at least 4 January 2016.

President of the Corsican Assembly Jean-Guy Talamoni blamed the "imported" ideology of the National Front and claimed the protests and arson were anethema to Corsican nationalism, which had established the Corsican Republic. He also said the perpetrators tended to support the National Front and were not nationalists. In response the National Front issued a statement that read "the unacceptable violence which shook Ajaccio on 25 December is the unfortunately expected consequence of lax and weak politics, which leaves neighbourhoods to become no-go areas where representatives of the emergency services are assaulted daily." Corsica's administrator Christophe Mirmand said: "This behaviour must stop. It hurts Corsica's image."

=== Religion ===
Olivier de Germay, Bishop of Ajaccio, condemned the violence, stating that "those who commit violent acts in the name of the Christian faith are fooling themselves."

=== Academia ===
Eugène Gherardi, a professor of Corsican culture and history, shares the view that xenophobic forms of nationalism reached the island through the National Front. However, Emmanuel Martin of the Institute for Economic Studies in Europe noted that the protesters were chanting in Corsican and displaying the island's flag, theorising that the alleged xenophobia would be stronger in Corsica where some locals already believe that their homeland has been colonised by the French.

== See also ==
- List of ethnic riots
- 2022 Corsica unrest
