= Paramount Network (international) =

International television channel brand owned by Paramount Global

Paramount Network (International)
- Product type: Television broadcaster
- Current owner: Skydance
- Country: United States
- Introduced: List: February 14, 2011 (Netherlands & Flanders) March 30, 2012 (Spain) May 13, 2012 (Austria) September 5, 2013 (France) February 14, 2014 (Hungary) February 14, 2014 (Russia and CIS) May 28, 2014 (Romania & Moldova) November 14, 2014 (Latin America and Brazil) December 16, 2014 (Sweden, Denmark, Norway) March 19, 2015 (Poland) February 2016 (Thailand) February 27, 2016 (Italy) April 15, 2017 (MENA) 2017 (Vietnam and Malaysia) July 4, 2018 (United Kingdom) June 1, 2019 (Philippines) October 1, 2019 (Finland) February 19, 2020 (Ukraine) January 12, 2021 (Czech Republic) February 1, 2021 (Singapore) February 1, 2021 (Southeast Asia) September 27, 2021 (TransVision, Indonesia) October 1, 2021 (myTV Super, Hong Kong) October 15, 2021 (Cable TV, Hong Kong) December 9, 2021 (Brunei)
- Discontinued: List: September 1, 2020 (MENA) January 6, 2021 (Flanders) January 12, 2021 (Romania & Moldova) January 1, 2022 (Denmark, Finland, Sweden & Norway) January 17, 2022 (Italy) January 19, 2022 (United Kingdom) April 28, 2022 (Russia) December 14, 2022 (Belarus) January 1, 2023 (Vietnam) January 4, 2023 (CIS and Ukraine) June 1, 2023 (Cable TV, Hong Kong) September 29, 2023 (myTV Super, Hong Kong) April 1, 2024 (Southeast Asia and Hong Kong) January 1, 2026 (Czech Republic, Spain, Latin America, France, Hungary and Brazil)

Paramount Network is an international television channel brand owned and operated by the Skydance Global Content Sales division of Skydance that showcase its selected television productions and the film catalogue of its filming division, Paramount Pictures. First launched in Spain on 30 March 2012, as Paramount Channel, the brand has since been or was operated in territories across Europe, East Africa, Latin America and Asia.

== History ==
=== As Paramount Channel ===
To date, Paramount Channel has launched in Spain in March 2012, France in September 2013, Hungary in February 2014, Russia in January 2014, Romania on January 14, 2014, Latin America in November 2014, Sweden in December 2014, Poland in March 2015, Italy and Thailand in February and May 2016, and in the Middle East in April 2017.

=== Relaunch as Paramount Network ===
Paramount Network logo without the mountain, used since 2018

In May 2018, Viacom announced that the original Paramount Channel in Spain would relaunch as a local version of the U.S Paramount Network, switching to a general entertainment format with television series and films. The same relaunch as the Paramount Network occurred in Italy on March 16, 2019, and in Latin America on April 14, 2020. On October 20, 2020, it was announced that the Hungarian version would also rebrand as the Paramount Network, and the rebranding date was confirmed on November 23 that year. Paramount Channel in Hungary rebranded as the Paramount Network on December 17, 2020. In December 2020, ViacomCBS announced Prima Comedy Central in the Czech Republic will be rebranded as Paramount Network. Paramount Network launched effectively on January 12, 2021. On January 26, 2021, ViacomCBS announced through the Paramount Channel Asia official Facebook page that the Paramount Channel in Thailand, Malaysia, and the Pacific Islands (including the Philippines) was to be rebranded as Paramount Network on February 1, 2021.

On January 20, 2025, Paramount Channel France rebranded as Paramount Network being the first international version to adopt the branding introduced for the US in 2024, and finally retiring the Paramount Channel name introduced almost 13 years ago.

=== Gradual cease in operations ===
In 2021, Paramount Global began discontinuing operations of Paramount Network internationally, starting with Romania and Moldova, where it was replaced by TeenNick.

In August 2021, Paramount Networks International agreed a deal with Comcast Corporation's Sky Group to launch the Paramount+ streaming service in various European markets via Sky's set-top boxes and devices. To reduce overall branding confusion with Paramount+, Paramount Network in the UK was rebranded as 5Action on 19 January 2022, without any overall changes to its programme schedule.

Less than two weeks before the UK rebranding, rumors begin to surge about Paramount Network and Spike in Italy closing on January 17, 2022. This was later confirmed, with Mediaset acquiring the positions left unused on DTT, and Paramount Network being replaced with the channel Twentyseven.

Following the Russian invasion of Ukraine, all the channels under the control of Paramount Global were discontinued from Russia, including the Paramount Channel, on April 28, 2022. The channel would be permanently discontinued in CIS regions and Ukraine on January 4, 2023.

By April 1, 2024, Paramount Network ceased operations in Southeast Asia following the arrival of both streaming platforms, Paramount+ which launched in June via Blast TV, and Pluto TV which will launch in the near future.

On October 8, 2025, Paramount announced that Paramount Network would shut down in France on December 31, 2025 along with Game One and J-One, it was also announced on the same day that the channel would also shut down in Latin America on December 31, 2025 (for the same day as in France and Central Eastern European countries like Hungary and the Czech Republic) along with TeenNick, NickMusic and the MTV thematic channels (MTV 80s, MTV 00s, MTV Hits, MTV Live and Club MTV) due to the company's global restructuring policy.

On October 22, 2025, Paramount announced that Paramount Network would shut down in Spain on DTT and pay TV platforms on December 31, 2025, as part of a global cost-cutting program by Paramount Skydance Corporation, being replaced by Squirrel Dos, acting as a sister channel to Squirrel which replaced Disney Channel Spain on DTT earlier in the year.

The only two Paramount Network channels outside of the US, that are expected to continue active by 2026 thus far, are the ones in the Netherlands and Poland.

== Programming ==
The original Paramount Channel in Spain primarily broadcast films from the 1980s and 1990s, as well as recent television series. The international versions that followed shared a similar format but never the same programming. For instance, films from the 1950s, 1960s, 1970s were broadcast in France, recent TV series and 1990s and 2000s films were broadcast in Italy, and films and TV series from the 1930s, 1970s, 1980s, 2000s, and 2010s were broadcast in Hungary, Poland, Romania, Czech Republic, Russia, the Middle East, Latin America, and Southeast Asia. In addition to airing films, some versions in other countries are also airing combat sporting events from mixed martial arts promotion Bellator MMA.

Following the rebranding of the channel (along with international Spike channels) as Paramount Network, it now adds series from its U.S. domestic counterpart as well as from the television production companies of Paramount Global and from acquisition of syndicated programming. In some countries, shows from Comedy Central are also aired on the channel.

== List of channels ==
=== Operating ===
Country	Name	Launch date	Former names
United States	Paramount Network	March 7, 1983	The Nashville Network (1983–2000); The National Network (2000–2001); The New TNN (2001–2003); Spike TV (2003–2006); Spike (2006–2018)
Netherlands	Paramount Network	February 14, 2011	TeenNick (2011–2015); Spike (2015–2022)
Poland	Paramount Network	July 20, 2011	Viacom Blink! (2011–2015); Paramount Channel (2015–2022)

=== Defunct ===
Country	Name	Former names	Launch date	Shutdown date	Replaced by
United Kingdom	The Paramount Channel	None at launch	November 1, 1995	February 1, 1997	Comedy Central
United Kingdom	5Spike	Spike (2015–2017)	April 15, 2015	January 7, 2020	Paramount Network
United Kingdom	Paramount Network	None at launch	July 4, 2018	January 19, 2022	5Action
Spain	Paramount Network	Paramount Channel (2012–2018)	March 30, 2012	January 1, 2026	Squirrel2
Hungary	RTL Spike	None at launch	December 1, 2016	January 12, 2021	TeenNick (Hungary & Romania)
Romania and Moldova	Paramount Channel	None at launch	May 28, 2014	January 12, 2021	TeenNick (Hungary & Romania)
Flanders	Spike	TeenNick (2011–2015)	February 14, 2011	January 6, 2021	Nickelodeon
Italy	Paramount Network	Paramount Channel (2016–2019)	February 27, 2016	January 17, 2022	Twentyseven
Italy	Spike	Fine Living (2014–2017)	October 22, 2017	January 17, 2022	Discontinued
Australia	Spike	None at launch	July 1, 2016	February 27, 2022	Discontinued
Russia & CIS	Spike	None at launch	March 15, 2017	June 1, 2021	Discontinued
Russia & CIS	Paramount Channel	None at launch	February 14, 2014	April 28, 2022 (Russia); December 14, 2022 (Belarus); January 4, 2023 (CIS)	Discontinued
Asia	Paramount Channel	None at launch	February 1, 2021	January 1, 2023 (Vietnam); April 1, 2024 (Southeast Asia and Hong Kong)	Discontinued
Arabia	Paramount Channel	None at launch	April 15, 2017	September 1, 2020	Discontinued
Finland	Paramount Network	None at launch	October 1, 2019	January 1, 2022	Discontinued
Austria	Paramount Network	None at launch	January 14 2019	October 31, 2021	Discontinued
Philippines	Paramount Network	None at launch	June 1, 2019	April 1, 2024	Discontinued
Sweden	Paramount Network	Comedy Central (2009–2019)	January 15, 2019	January 1, 2022	Discontinued
Norway	Paramount Network	Comedy Central (2014–2019)	January 15, 2019	January 1, 2022	Discontinued
Denmark	Paramount Network	Comedy Central (2014–2019)	January 8, 2019	January 1, 2022	Discontinued
Czech Republic and Slovakia	Paramount Network	Prima Comedy Central (2015–2021)	January 12, 2021	January 1, 2026	Discontinued
Latin America	Paramount Network	Paramount Channel (2014–2020)	November 14, 2014	January 1, 2026	Discontinued
Brazil	Paramount Network	Paramount Channel (2014–2020)	November 14, 2014	January 1, 2026	Discontinued
Hungary	Paramount Network	Paramount Channel (2014–2020)	January 12, 2021	January 1, 2026	Discontinued
France	Paramount Network	Paramount Channel (2013–2025)	September 5, 2013	January 1, 2026	Discontinued
