= Hot Comedy Central =

Israeli Hebrew-language television channel

HOT Comedy Central הוט קומדי סנטרל
- Country: Israel
- Broadcast area: Nationwide
- Headquarters: Tel Aviv, Israel

Programming
- Language: Hebrew
- Picture format: 576i (SDTV) (4:3 / 16:9) (2011-2015); HDTV (2015-present)

Ownership
- Owner: Ananey Communications (Paramount Networks EMEAA)
- Sister channels: Nickelodeon Israel, MTV Israel

History
- Launched: January 1, 2011

Links
- Website: http://www.comedycentral.co.il/he/home

HOT Comedy Central (Hebrew: קומדי סנטרל) is the Hebrew-language version Comedy Central. It is the 10th Comedy Central channel. The channel was launched on January 1, 2011. The channel shows international and local shows. The channel is owned by Ananey Communications, a subsidiary of Paramount Networks EMEAA and broadcasts exclusively for cable on HOT.

The channel was initially broadcast in 4:3 aspect ratio, later transferred to 16:9 widescreen yet still in standard definition, and began broadcasting in High Definition on August 3, 2015.

== See also ==
- Comedy Central
- MTV Israel
- Nickelodeon Israel
- Bip
