= Nickelodeon (Israeli TV channel) =

Israeli children's channel

- Logo used since 2023 (Note: The logo's wordmark has been in use since 2010. Additionally, there is a variant meant to be used for white backgrounds; the main variant has a white wordmark in conjunction with a fully orange splat.)
- Country: Israel
- Broadcast area: Nationwide
- Headquarters: Tel Aviv, Israel

Programming
- Language: Hebrew (dubbing/Subtitles)
- Picture format: SDTV 576i

Ownership
- Owner: Ananey (Paramount Networks EMEAA)
- Parent: Nickelodeon Group
- Sister channels: Nick Jr.

History
- Launched: 15 March 1996 (as programming block of Arutz HaYeladim); 1 July 2003 (as an independent channel)

Links
- Website: Official Site

Nickelodeon (Hebrew: ניקלודיאון) is an Israeli children's television channel launched on 1 July 2003.

== Programming ==
=== Israel original shows ===
- Shchuna (שכונה) – In English, "Neighborhood".
- HaHamama (החממה) – The original show of Netflix's The "Greenhouse Academy".
- HaTzhokia (הצחוקייה) – A kids stand-up show with Israel's most popular comedians.
- Neelamin (נעלמים) – In English, "Vanished".
- Betzefer (בצפר)- A Hebrew slang commonly used by students, for the word "Beit-Sefer". In English, it means "School".
- Kadabra (כדברא) – In English, "Spell keeprs".
- Yapanick (יפניק) A kids wipeout type show, in which classes from all over the countries compete to win a prize.
- Championsnick (צ'מפיונסניק) – A game show between schools from all over the country to win a trip to Barcelona.
- Forever (פוראבר) – In English, "forever".
- Spyders (ספיידרז) – In English, "the Spyders".
- Gan Hayot (גן חיות) – A kid's sketch comedy show taking place in a fictional zoo called "Gancha".
- Ziggy (זיגי) – A 16-year-old with vitiligo struggles with self-confidence as he pursues his dream of being a performer.

=== Current ===
- Best & Bester (9 October 2022 – present)
- Big Nate (22 September 2022 – present)
- The Casagrandes (22 March 2020 – present)
- Kamp Koral: SpongeBob's Under Years (1 September 2021 – present)
- Middlemost Post (17 October 2021 – present)
- Monster High (6 February 2023 – present)
- Rugrats (2021) (22 July 2022 – present)
- SpongeBob SquarePants (1 July 2003–present)
- Star Trek: Prodigy (5 November 2022–present)
- The Loud House (15 May 2016 – present)
- The Patrick Star Show (17 October 2021 – present)
- The Smurfs (2021)

=== Upcoming ===
- Fairy Express

=== Former ===
==== Animated ====
- 44 Cats
- Aaahh!!! Real Monsters
- Action League Now!
- The Adventures of Jimmy Neutron, Boy Genius
- The Adventures of Kid Danger
- All Grown Up!
- Alvinnn!!! and the Chipmunks
- The Angry Beavers
- As Told by Ginger
- Avatar: The Last Airbender
- Back at the Barnyard
- Bakugan Battle Planet
- The Barbarian and the Troll
- Beyblade Burst
- Bolts & Blip
- Breadwinners
- Bunsen Is a Beast
- CatDog
- Catscratch
- ChalkZone
- Danny Phantom
- Daria
- Delilah & Julius
- Doodlez
- Dorg Van Dango
- Dr. Zitbag's Transylvania Pet Shop
- Dragon Ball Super
- El Tigre: The Adventures of Manny Rivera
- The Fairly OddParents
- Fanboy & Chum Chum
- Fatherhood
- Flatmania
- Frankenstein's Cat
- Gasp!
- Get Blake!
- The Gnoufs
- Harvey Beaks
- Hero Factory
- Hey Arnold!
- Invader Zim
- It's Pony (10 May 2020 – 12 February 2024)
- Johnny Test
- KaBlam!
- Kappa Mikey
- Kung Fu Panda: Legends of Awesomeness
- The Legend of Korra
- Legends of Chima
- Lego Friends
- Lego Star Wars: The Yoda Chronicles
- The Mighty B!
- Monsters vs. Aliens
- Monsuno
- Mr. Meaty
- My Life as a Teenage Robot
- Ninjago
- O'Grady
- Oh Yeah! Cartoons
- Ollie's Pack
- The Penguins of Madagascar
- Pirate Family
- Pitt & Kantrop
- Planet Sheen
- Rabbids Invasion
- Rainbow Butterfly Unicorn Kitty (9 February 2020 – 2020)
- Random! Cartoons
- The Ren & Stimpy Show
- Ricky Sprocket: Showbiz Boy
- Rise of the Teenage Mutant Ninja Turtles
- Robot and Monster
- Rocket Monkeys
- Rocket Power
- Rocko's Modern Life
- Rugrats
- Samson and Neon
- Sanjay and Craig
- Scaredy Camp
- Skyland
- T.U.F.F. Puppy
- Tak and the Power of Juju
- Team Hot Wheels
- Teenage Mutant Ninja Turtles
- The X's
- ToonMarty
- Transformers: Robots in Disguise
- Transformers: Cyberverse
- Trollz
- Vampires, Pirates & Aliens
- Wayside
- Welcome to the Wayne
- The Wild Thornberrys
- Winx Club
- Yakkity Yak

==== Live-action ====
- The Adventures of Pete & Pete
- All That
- The Amanda Show
- The Brothers García
- Clarissa Explains It All
- Cousin Skeeter
- Drake & Josh
- Girls v. Boys
- House of Anubis
- The Journey of Allen Strange
- Just for Kicks
- Just Jordan
- Kenan & Kel
- The Naked Brothers Band
- Naturally, Sadie
- Ned's Declassified School Survival Guide
- The Nick Cannon Show
- Noah Knows Best
- Renford Rejects
- Road Rules
- Romeo!
- Unfabulous
- Zoey 101

==== Nick Jr. series (2007–2012) ====
- Ben & Holly's Little Kingdom
- Blue's Clues
- Bubble Guppies
- Dora the Explorer
- Go, Diego, Go!
- Little Bill
- Ni Hao, Kai-Lan
- Oobi
- Team Umizoomi
- Tickety Toc
- Wonder Pets!

==== TeenNick series (2013–2017) ====
- 100 Things to Do Before High School
- Big Time Rush
- Bella and the Bulldogs
- Degrassi: The Next Generation
- Every Witch Way
- Fred: The Show
- Game Shakers (19 October 2016 – 2019)
- Henry Danger
- How to Rock
- Instant Mom (5 August 2015 – 2016)
- Make It Pop
- Marvin Marvin
- Max & Shred
- Nicky, Ricky, Dicky & Dawn
- Sam & Cat
- School of Rock
- See Dad Run
- Supah Ninjas
- The Haunted Hathaways
- The Thundermans
- The Troop
- True Jackson, VP
- iCarly
- Victorious
- You Gotta See This
- Wendell & Vinnie
- WITS Academy (23 November 2016 – 2016)
- What's Up Warthogs!

== Opening and closing times (Over now) ==
Nickelodeon used to sign-on at 6:00 AM and sign-off at 12:00 AM. Nowadays, Nickelodeon Israel is always on air, broadcasting SpongeBob SquarePants in the Hebrew dub for 6 hours from midnight to 6 AM.
