= MTV (France) =

- Country: Spain; France
- Broadcast area: France, Switzerland, Monaco, French-Speaking Africa, Overseas France, Haiti
- Headquarters: Madrid, Spain; Neuilly-sur-Seine, France

Programming
- Language: French
- Picture format: 1080i HDTV (downscaled to 16:9 576i for the SDTV feed)

Ownership
- Owner: Paramount Networks EMEAA
- Sister channels: Nickelodeon; Nickelodeon Junior; Nicktoons

History
- Launched: 20 June 2000
- Replaced: MTV Europe
- Former names: MTVF

Links
- Website: www.mtv.fr

MTV France is a French pay-television channel operated by Paramount Networks EMEAA. It was launched as MTV Networks Europe began to further localise its brand throughout Europe. MTV France (previously MTVF) was launched on 20 June 2000. It is also distributed in Switzerland (Romandie), Monaco and Francophone Africa.

Its headquarters are at Paramount Networks EMEAA in Madrid with a local office at MTV Networks France in Neuilly-sur-Seine.

== History ==
- Upon launch MTV Europe was available in France. In June 2000 MTV Networks Europe replaced MTV Europe with MTVF in France and other French-speaking territories.
- In 2005, MTV Networks Europe further expanded the MTV brand within France with the launch of MTV Pulse and MTV Idol. Other MTV channels are also available including the pan-European versions of MTV Rocks, MTV Hits, VH1 Europe, MTV Base.
- In December 2007 MTV Networks France a subsidiary of MTV Networks Europe launched a French-speaking version of MTV Base.
- In November 2008, MTVNHD launched in France.
- In January 2011, MTV Networks France launched services related to MTV, MTV Base, Nickelodeon and Game One for use on Philips connected TV sets. Each channel offers access to free video contents, news and trailers from brands MTV, MTV Base, MTV Pulse, MTV Idol, Game One, Game One Music HD, Nickelodeon and Nickelodeon junior.
- In March 2016, MTV +1 was replaced by Nickelodeon +1.

== VJs ==
- Frédérique Bedos (French Link; 2000-2003)
- Daniela (MTV Total Request, MTV Select; 2003-2006)
- Guillaume Stanczyk (MTV Buzz, MTV Select; 2003-2006)
- Mouloud(MTV Select; 2004)
- China(MTV Select, MTV News; 2004)
- Ariel Wizman (MTV Select; 2004)

== Former shows ==
- Euro 20
- French Link
- Hitlist Base
- Hitlist France
- Hitlist Rock
- Hitlist US
- Hitlist Yo!
- Hot Link
- La French Night
- Love Link
- MTV 8
- MTV News France
- MTV Reaction
- MTV Select France
- Pimp My Ride France (2009-2011)
- Total Request France

== See also ==
- MTV Base
- MTV Idol
- MTV Pulse
- Viacom International Media Networks Europe
