= BET (French TV channel) =

French TV channel

Black Entertainment Television
- Logo used since 2022
- Country: France
- Broadcast area: France
- Network: BET
- Headquarters: Neuilly-sur-Seine, France

Programming
- Language: French
- Picture format: 576i (16:9 SDTV); 1080i (HDTV)

Ownership
- Owner: Paramount Networks EMEAA

History
- Launched: 17 November 2015; 10 years ago
- Closed: 1 January 2026; 3 months ago

Links
- Website: www.betchannel.fr

BET France was a French TV channel owned by Paramount Skydance Corporation. It was the French version of BET in the United States. It was launched on November 17, 2015 in France.

In France since the end of June 2012, a BET Break box was broadcast every day with The Heat and 106 & Park on MTV.

In October 2015, the launch of BET France was announced for November 17, 2015. This information created a controversy because of the absence of black animators on a historical community channel.

After weeks of negotiations, an agreement was reached between the ViacomCBS and Canal groups, the Canal Group retained the BET channels, MTV Hits France and J-One.

The channel's voiceover was China Moses.

Since January 14, 2020, the channel changed its number to channel 85 of the Canal+

In 2021, Canal+ replaced BET in its overseas operations by Nickelodeon Junior.

BET ceased broadcasting in France on January 1, 2026.
