= Nick Jr. (Israel) =

Israeli television programming block and channel

- Country: Israel
- Broadcast area: Nationwide

Programming
- Languages: English; Hebrew (Dubbing)

Ownership
- Owner: Ananey (Paramount Networks EMEAA)
- Parent: Nickelodeon Group

History
- Launched: 13 June 2003 (block); 7 February 2012 (channel)

Nick Jr. (Hebrew: ניק ג'וניור) in Israel was launched as a programming block in 2003 by Viacom International Media Networks. The cable channel went live on the air on February 7, 2012.

== Programming ==
The Nick Jr. programming aims to educate and entertain young minds with a mix of local and international shows.
