= Nickelodeon (French TV channel) =

French television channel

Nickelodeon France
- Logo used since 2 September 2023 (Note: The logo's wordmark has been in use since 26 January 2010. Additionally, there is a variant meant to be used for white backgrounds; the main variant has a white wordmark in conjunction with a fully orange splat.)
- Country: France
- Broadcast area: France; Switzerland; Monaco; French-Speaking Africa; Overseas France; Haiti
- Headquarters: Neuilly-sur-Seine

Programming
- Language: French
- Picture format: 1080i

Ownership
- Owner: Skydance Corporation
- Parent: Nickelodeon Group
- Sister channels: Nickelodeon Junior; Nicktoons; MTV France; Comedy Central

History
- Launched: 16 November 2005

Links
- Website: Official website (now redirects to nick.com/global)

Availability

Streaming media
- MyCanal: canalplus.com/live/?channel=591
- Molotov. tv: molotov.tv/fr_fr/c/262/nickelodeon

"Nick" is unused in French because it sounds similar to the French swear word "niquer"

Nickelodeon is a French pay television channel and is the local variant of the American children's network Nickelodeon in France, as well as in other French-speaking countries such as of Switzerland, Monaco, Overseas France, and Francophone Africa. The network has two sister networks, Nickelodeon Junior and Nicktoons.

The network is solely branded as "Nickelodeon" in Francophone regions, with the common branding shortening of "Nick" used in all other markets completely unused due to "Nick" sounding similar to the French swear word niquer.

== History ==
On 10 January 2003, Nicktoons was launched as a programming block in France on Canal J.

The French variant of Nickelodeon was announced in 2005, and was officially launched on 16 November of that same year. The channel's application to broadcast on French digital terrestrial television was rejected by the CSA in favor of Gulli, a child-oriented channel (launched as a joint-venture between the Lagardère Group and the public broadcaster France Télévisions). It gained revenue through advertisement and product sales. At the time, its market value was equal to €300 million. According to research conducted by ConsoJunior in 2006, Nickelodeon France was the most-watched channel among children between 4 and 14 years old. During this time, the channel premiered series from the American channel such as SpongeBob SquarePants, Avatar: The Last Airbender and Dora the Explorer. Thereafter, during the first half of 2007, Nickelodeon increased its audience share by 113% over a year. Due to this, some French celebrities such as Matt Pokora started to appear on the channel as hosts.

On 26 January 2010, Nickelodeon France adopted the new logo and rebranded its graphical package. On that same day, the preschool channel Nickelodeon Junior was launched. In November of that same year, the network celebrated its fifth anniversary. On 20 September 2011, it switched its aspect ratio from 4:3 to 16:9. In May 2013, Nickelodeon announced the release of two new video games of Dora the Explorer, in association with 2K Games.

From 28 June to 12 July 2013, the channel organized the Crazy Tour Nickelodeon in six malls in France. On 6 September 2014, Nickelodeon France premiered Rabbids Invasion, an original series of the channel.

On 19 November 2014, Nickelodeon 4Teen was launched, with its programming being centered on series for teenagers. It was rebranded as Nickelodeon Teen in 2017. On 22 September 2015, Nickelodeon HD was launched on Canalsat. In March 2016, Nickelodeon +1 was launched, replacing the timeshift feed of MTV, MTV +1. In 2019, Nickelodeon channels were launched on French ISP bouquets, ending their exclusivity on Canal+. In January 2021, Nickelodeon, J-One and Comedy Central were added to the Mauritius Telecom's My.t offers.

== Sister channels ==
=== Nickelodeon Junior ===
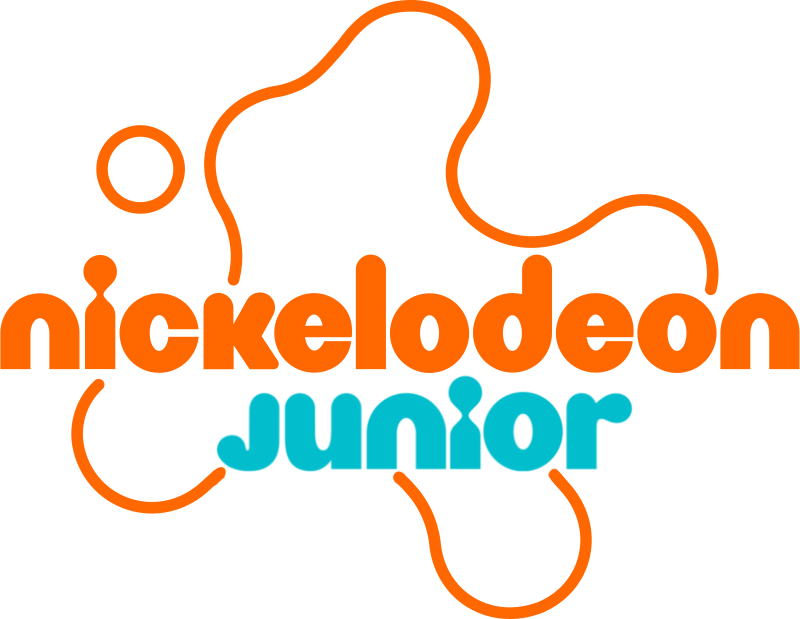
French logo

Nickelodeon Junior was launched as a television channel on 26 January 2010. Prior to its launch, Nick Jr. programming was part of Nickelodeon.

=== Nicktoons ===
Nickelodeon 4Teen was launched on 19 November 2014, broadcasting in HD and focusing on live-action shows for a tween and teen audiences.

On 26 August 2017, the channel was renamed Nickelodeon Teen.

On 15 July 2025, the channel was rebranded as a French variant of Nicktoons.

== N-Toons ==
N-Toons
- N-Toons logo used from 21 October 2011 until 31 July 2015

Programming
- Picture format: 576i (SDTV); 1080i (HDTV)

Ownership
- Owner: Viacom

History
- Launched: 10 January 2003 (original); 21 October 2011 (2011 reboot)
- Closed: 7 November 2005 (Nicktoons, the block was subsequently reorganized into N-Toons); 31 July 2015 (2011 reboot)
- Replaced by: Nickelodeon

Links
- Website: www.nickelodeon.fr

N-Toons, formerly known as Nicktoons, was a block on the French network Canal J, which launched the Nickelodeon brand in France. A separate network launched to carry Nickelodeon in 2005 and the Canal J block was rebranded as N-Toons. The block later returned on 21 October 2011, which run until 31 July 2015 on the French version of Nickelodeon Wallonia.

== See also ==
- List of Nickelodeon international channels
- Nickelodeon Switzerland, German-speaking Swiss version in Switzerland
