= Game One =

French television channel

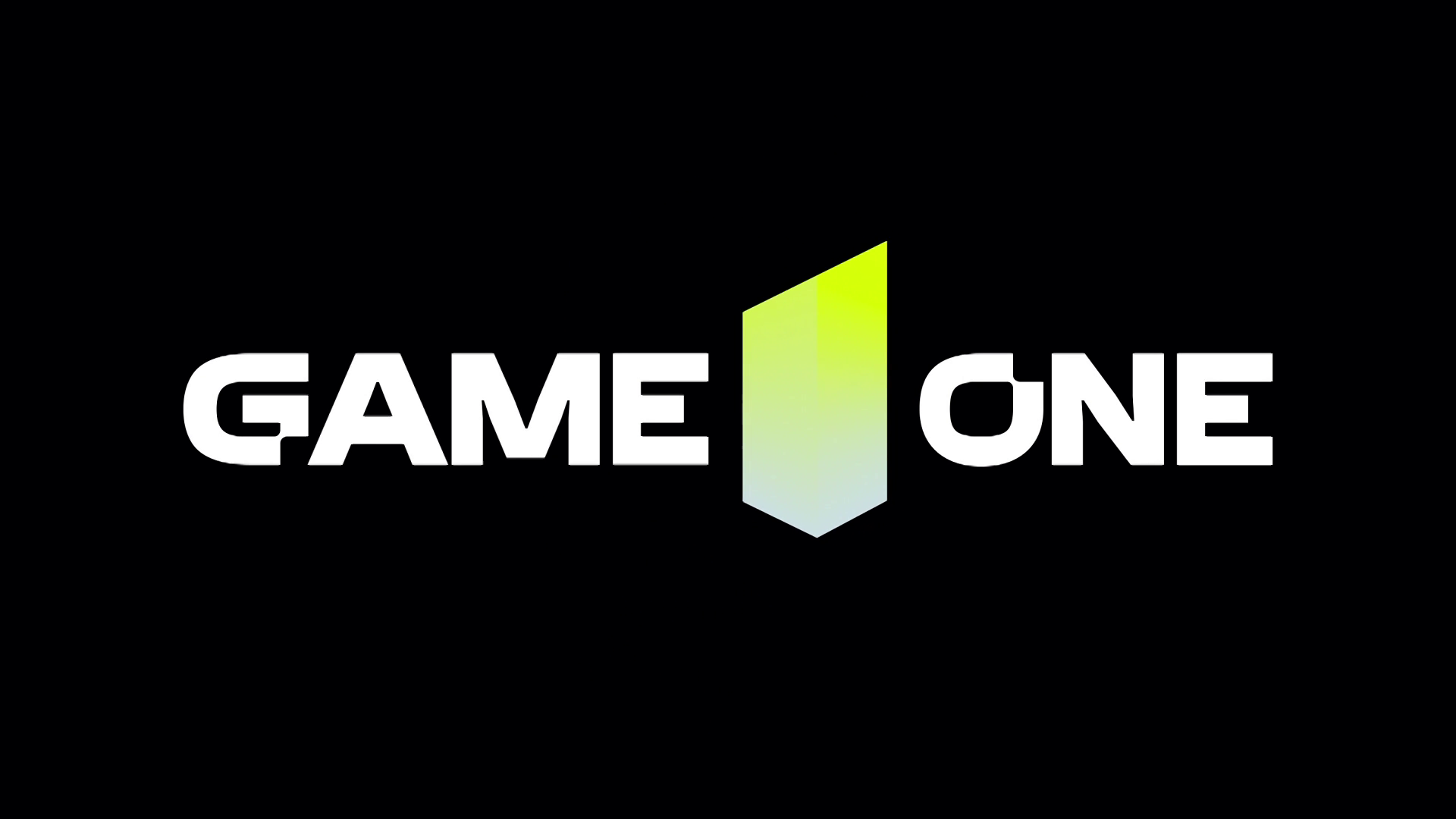
- Country: France
- Broadcast area: France, Belgium, Switzerland, Luxembourg, Africa

Programming
- Languages: French, English (1998-1999)
- Picture format: 576i (16:9 SDTV); 1080i (HDTV)
- Timeshift service: Game One +1

Ownership
- Owner: Infogrames/Atari (1998–2006); Groupe Canal+ (1998–2001); Paramount Networks France (2003–2025)
- Sister channels: J-One

History
- Launched: 7 September 1998; 28 years ago
- Founder: Alain Le Diberder
- Replaced: C: (1996–1998)
- Closed: 31 December 2025; 9 months ago

Links
- Website: gameone.net

Game One was a French television channel owned by Paramount Networks EMEAA. The channel showed several programs based on video games. It also aired Japanese anime on a regular basis.

== History ==
In Germany between 2006 and 2014, a television show about video games with the same name aired on MTV Germany. After the show was cancelled, Game One staff launched an online television channel, named Rocket Beans TV, on Twitch and YouTube.

Since 2016, they present the web show Game Two, with the support of funk, which is the online service of the German television channels Das Erste and ZDF.

== Shutdown ==
On 8 October 2025, a report revealed the closure of the channel from late November, as part of a plan from Paramount Skydance that would affect more than 50% of its television workforce in France. The channel was still profitable, with net gains of €2 million per year. Its staff was surprised by the decision.

However, the channel, along with J-One, could return as early as March 2026 with a new shareholder, and Paramount Network France was reportedly in negotiations to sell the channels.

== See also ==
- Can I Play That?
- Great Big Game Show
