= Nicktoons (French TV channel) =

French television channel

- Logo used since July 15, 2025
- Country: France
- Broadcast area: France; Switzerland

Programming
- Language: French

Ownership
- Owner: Paramount Networks EMEAA
- Parent: Nickelodeon Group
- Sister channels: Nickelodeon; Nickelodeon Junior

History
- Launched: 19 November 2014; 11 years ago (as Nickelodeon 4Teen/Teen); 15 July 2025; 13 months ago (as Nicktoons)
- Former names: Nickelodeon 4Teen (2014-2017); Nickelodeon Teen (2017-2025)

Links
- Website: www.nickelodeon.fr (refers to global)

Nicktoons (formerly Nickelodeon Teen and Nickelodeon 4Teen) is a French pay television channel owned by Paramount Networks EMEAA. It is the French equivalent of Nicktoons.

== History ==
Logo used from 26 August 2017 until 20 May 2024.

Nickelodeon 4Teen launched on November 19, 2014, targeting tweens and teenagers. It changed its name to Nickelodeon Teen on 26 August 2017.

On November 20, 2019, the channel launched on the basic offer of Free, followed on Bouygues Télécom on January 28, 2020.

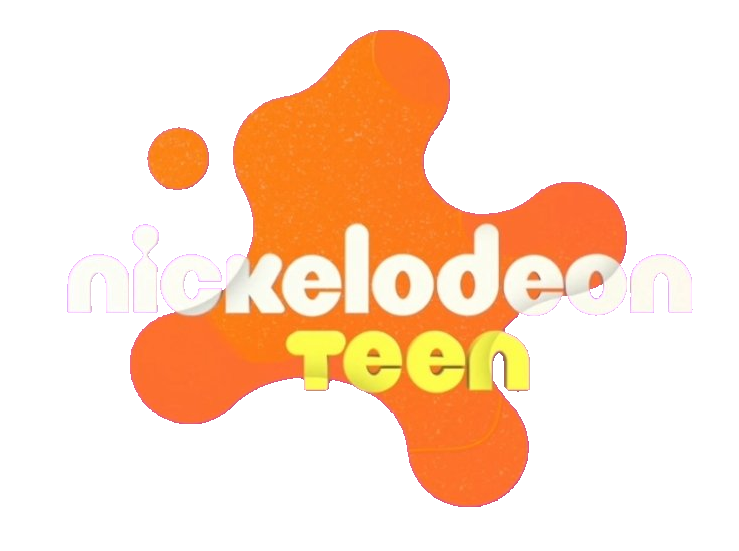
Logo used from 20 May 2024 until 15 July 2025.

On June 13, 2025, Paramount Networks EMEAA announced Nickelodeon Teen would rebrand to Nicktoons on 15 July.
