= J-One =

- Country: France
- Broadcast area: France, Switzerland, Africa
- Headquarters: Neuilly-sur-Seine, France

Programming
- Language: French
- Picture format: 1080i (HDTV)

Ownership
- Owner: Paramount Networks France
- Sister channels: Game One

History
- Launched: 4 October 2013; 13 years ago
- Closed: 31 December 2025; 9 months ago

Links
- Website: www.j-one.com

J-One was a French television channel dedicated to Japanese anime and culture. It was launched on 4 October 2013.

J-One broadcast anime in simulcast. Many of these are then broadcast with French dub on Game One.

J-One was a Canal+ exclusive, until 2019 when it joined ISP bouquets.

The channel closed alongside Game One on 31 December 2025. However, the channel, along with Game One, could return as early as March 2026 with a new shareholder, and Paramount Network France was reportedly in negotiations to sell the channels.
