= Nickelodeon Junior =

French television channel

- Country: France
- Broadcast area: France; Switzerland; French-Speaking Africa; Mauritius; Madagascar; Haiti
- Headquarters: Neuilly-sur-Seine, France

Programming
- Language: French

Ownership
- Owner: Paramount Networks EMEAA
- Parent: Nickelodeon Group
- Sister channels: Nickelodeon; Nicktoons

History
- Launched: 26 January 2010; 16 years ago

Links
- Website: nickelodeonjunior.fr (dead link, redirects to nick.com/global)

Logo used from 2010 until February 5, 2024.

Nickelodeon Junior is a French 24-hour television channel broadcasting to France and Switzerland for a toddler audience. It is the French equivalent of the Nick Jr. Channel, though with its French branding meeting domestic language policies, along with "Nick" sounding similar to a French profanity.

The Walloon version is called simply Nick Jr.

The channel was first announced on 26 November 2009. At launch, it used an ident package similar to the one used on the American Nick Jr. channel (months before the other international Nick Jr. feeds did so), although Moose and Zee were not present on the French version of the network.

On 24 May 2012, Nickelodeon Junior started broadcasting in 16:9 widescreen.

On 22 September 2015, Nickelodeon Junior HD was launched.

In 2019 and 2020, Nickelodeon channels were launched on French ISP bouquets, ending their exclusivity on Canal+.

In January 2021, Nickelodeon Junior was added to the Canal+ systems in Caledonia, the Caribbean and the French-speaking territories in Madagascar and the Indian Ocean, and shortly after in Sub-Saharan Africa.
