= VIVA Austria =

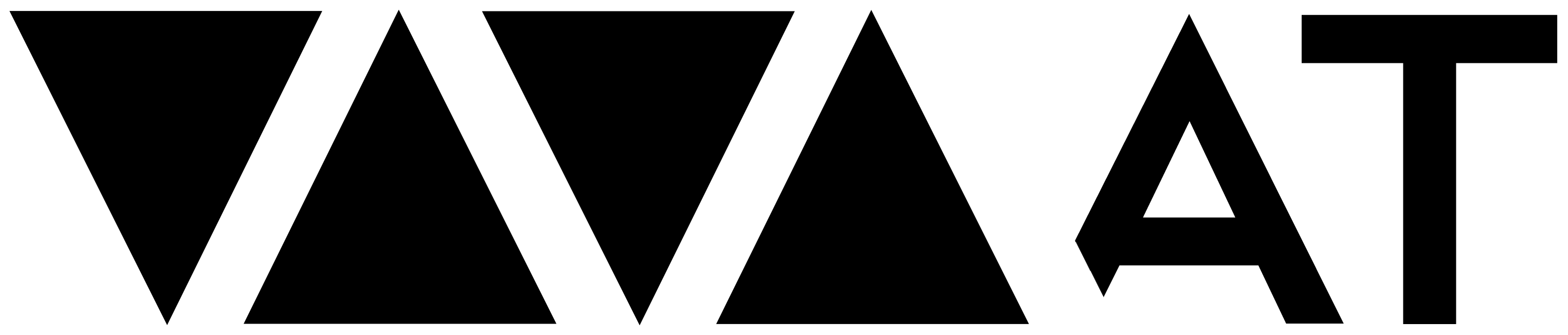
- Country: Austria
- Broadcast area: Austria
- Headquarters: Berlin, Germany

Programming
- Language(s): German
- Picture format: 576i (16:9 SDTV); 1080i (HDTV)

Ownership
- Owner: Viacom International Media Networks Europe
- Sister channels: MTV; MTV Brand New; Comedy Central; Nickelodeon; Nicktoons; Nick Jr.

History
- Launched: 1 May 2012; 13 years ago
- Closed: 31 December 2018; 6 years ago

Links
- Website: VIVA Austria

VIVA was an Austrian free-to-air television channel launched 2012 as the localised feed of VIVA Germany. In June 2018, Viacom announced that it would shut down all Viva operations worldwide by 31 December 2018.

== History ==
VIVA Austria was launched in May 2012, 15 per cent of the channels output consists of Austrian music, Chartshows and lifestyle programming taloried to the Austrian market. The channels marketing and promotion are done by Goldback Media. Prior to 2012, VIVA Germany aired across Austria with localized advertising and sponsorship for Austria.

From 8 September 2014, VIVA aired between 6 am and 5 pm. In the time between 5 pm and 6 am the program of Comedy Central Austria was shown. Until October 2014 there will be a simulcast broadcast of the program of Comedy Central on the shared frequency with Nickelodeon (8.15 pm to 5.45 am) and on the VIVA-frequency (5 pm to 6 am).

== Local Shows ==
- VIVA PUR: shows every 14 days, the "hottest news" comes to parties, people and trends, presented by VJ Mark Floth.
- VIVA Austria Top 100: from May 2014 Jenny Posch hosts a weekly countdown show.
- VIVA Austria Top 20: VJ Mark Floth newly presented every week and losers of the Austrian charts.

=== Programs ===
- 10 Dinge, die ich an dir hasse
- 180°
- Alle hassen Chris
- Amerikanischer Vater!
- Aqua Teen Hunger Force
- Awkward – Mein sogenanntes Leben
- Beavis und Butthead
- Blauer Bergstaat
- Bogenschütze
- Bully Beatdown
- Catfish – Verliebte im Netz
- Crash Canyon
- Criss Angel Mindfreak
- Das Pauly D-Projekt
- Degrassi: Die nächste Generation
- Detektiv Conan
- Deutschstunde
- Die Dudesons in Amerika
- Die harten Zeiten von RJ Berger
- Die Pinguine aus Madasgcar
- Die Ren & Stimpy Show
- Echte Männer von Hollywood
- Ein Baumhügel
- Ein Stück
- Einfache Jane
- Esel
- Eure VIVA Lieblingsklicks
- Familienmensch
- Faust des Zen
- Feat.
- Flash Prank
- Freude
- Friendzone
- Futurama
- Game One
- Gemacht
- Geordie Shore
- Get the Clip
- Glückliche Baumfreunde
- Good Morning Saturday
- Good Morning Sunday
- Guy Code
- Happy End
- The Hasselhoffs
- Hässliche Amerikaner
- Hollys Welt
- Ich war mal dick
- InuYasha: Ein feudales Märchen
- Jerseyufer
- Jungs mit Kindern
- Kendra
- Kenny gegen Spenny
- Kesha: Mein verrücktes schönes Leben
- Killer-Karaoke
- Lächerlichkeit
- Liebe oder nicht
- Love Test 3 in 1
- Loveline
- Mein Leben als Liz
- Meine super süße Weltklasse
- Meinen Wagen aufmotzen
- Melissa und Joey
- Mit den Kardashians Schritt halten
- Mixery Massive Music
- Most Wanted 2000s
- MTV at the Movies
- MTV Europe Music Awards
- MTV Home
- MTV Movie Awards
- MTV Top 100 (until December 2017 as VIVA Top 100)
- MTV Unplugged
- MTV Video Music Awards
- MTV World Stage
- Music
- My Kid Is Gonna Be Famous
- Narben
- Naruto
- Neu
- Neu um 9
- Night Sounds
- Night Sounds Party (on the weekend instead of Night Sounds)
- Nitrozirkus
- O.C., Kalifornien
- Party, Bruder!
- Promi-Deathmatch
- Punk'd
- Retro Charts
- Riesig
- Roboter Huhn
- Sailor Moon
- Savage U
- Scandalicious
- The Short List
- Skins
- SMS Guru
- Snooki und Jwoww
- Special Charts
- Süd Park
- SpongeBob Schwammkopf
- Streichelte
- Style Star
- Supercharts
- Teen Mama 2
- Then and Now
- Todd und das Buch des Bösen
- Todes-Tal
- Tsubasa: Reservoir Chronik
- Undateable
- Unglücksdatum
- Unhöfliches Rohr
- Unterbeschäftigt
- Versuchsgelände
- VIVA Charts ... 1 Year Ago
- VIVA Charts ... 5 Years Ago
- VIVA Club Rotation
- VIVA Comet
- VIVA Fahrstuhlmusik
- VIVA Live!
- VIVA Quiz
- VIVA Sounds
- VIVA Spezial
- VIVA Streaming Charts
- VIVA Top 20 Singlecharts
- VIVA Top 40 Singlecharts
- VIVA Top 100
- VIVA Wecker
- VIVA's Most Played Charts
- VIVA's Most Wanted Charts
- VIVApedia
- Your Choice
- WakeBrothers
- Young & Married
- Zusammen gezeichnet

== VJs ==
- Mark Floth (since 2012)
- Jenny Posch (since May 2014)
