= 1995 in German television =

This is a list of German television related events from 1995.

== Events ==
- 30 December - Debut of Soundmix Show, a series hosted by Linda de Mol in which members of the public impersonate their favourite singers.

== Debuts ==
=== Free for air ===
==== Domestic ====
- 2 January - Verbotene Liebe (1995–2015) (Das Erste)
- 20 February - Wilsberg (1995–present) (Das Erste)
- 19 March - Das Schwein – Eine deutsche Karriere (1995) (Sat.1)
- 19 April - Im Zweifel für ... (1995) (Das Erste)
- 4 May - Deutschlandlied (1995) (Arte)
- 18 June - Zu Fuß und ohne Geld (1995) (ZDF)
- 16 September - Gottschalks Hausparty (1995–1997)
- 20 November - Tödliche Wahl (1995) (ZDF)
- 24 December - Der Räuber mit der sanften Hand (1995) (RTL)
- 30 December - Soundmix Show (1995–1997)

==== International ====
- 21 April - (United Kingdom) The Shoe People (1987) (RTL II)
- 24 April - (United States) Seinfeld (1989–1998) (kabel eins)
- 28 April - (Canada) / (United States) Dog City (1992–1994) (ZDF)
- 28 July - (United States) Dastardly and Muttley in Their Flying Machines (1969–1970) (RTL II)
- 8 October - (United States) The Tick (1994–1996) (ProSieben)
- 22 October - (United States) Touched by an Angel (1994–2003) (RTL II)
- 30 October - (United States) ER (1994–2009) (ProSieben)
- 30 December - (United Kingdom) / (France) Oscar's Orchestra (1995–2000) (ZDF)

=== Cable ===
==== International ====
- July - (United States) Rugrats (1991-2004) (Nickelodeon)

=== Armed Forces Network ===
- (United States) Animaniacs (1993-1998)
- (United States) Barney & Friends (1992-2010)
- (Canada) / (United States) Dog City (1992-1994)
- (United States) / (Germany) / (United Kingdom) Secret Life of Toys (1994)

=== BFBS ===
- (United Kingdom) Oakie Doke (1995-1996)
- (United Kingdom) / (United States) / (Canada) Magic Adventures of Mumfie (1994-1999)

== Changes of network affiliation ==
Title	Original Country	Former Network	New Network	Date
Doctor Who	United Kingdom	RTL Television	VOX	2 February

== Television shows ==
=== 1950s ===
- Tagesschau (1952–present)

=== 1960s ===
- heute (1963-present)

=== 1970s ===
- heute-journal (1978-present)
- Tagesthemen (1978-present)

=== 1980s ===
- Wetten, dass..? (1981-2014)
- Lindenstraße (1985–present)

=== 1990s ===
- Gute Zeiten, schlechte Zeiten (1992–present)
- Marienhof (1992–2011)
- Unter uns (1994-present)

== Networks and services ==
=== Launches ===
Network	Type	Launch date	Notes	Source
VH-1	Cable television	10 March		
Viva Zwei	Cable television	21 March		
Super RTL	Cable television	28 April		
tm3	Cable television	25 August		
ServusTV	Cable television	17 September		
Unitel Classica	Cable television	Unknown		

=== Conversions and rebrandings ===
Old network name	New network name	Type	Conversion Date	Notes	Source
		Cable and satellite			

=== Closures ===
Network	Type	End date	Notes	Sources
[[]]	Cable and satellite			

== See also ==
- 1995 in Germany
