= VIVA Germany =

Former German TV station

VIVA
- Country: Germany
- Broadcast area: Germany
- Headquarters: Cologne (1993–2005); Berlin, Germany (2005–2018)

Programming
- Language: German
- Picture format: 1080i HDTV (downscaled to 16:9 576i for the SDTV feed)

Ownership
- Owner: Viacom International Media Networks Europe
- Sister channels: MTV; MTV Brand New; Comedy Central; Nickelodeon; Nicktoons; Nick Jr.

History
- Launched: 1 December 1993; 32 years ago
- Closed: 31 December 2018; 7 years ago
- Replaced by: Comedy Central

Links
- Website: http://www.viva.tv at the Wayback Machine (archived 14 January 2019)

Viva (stylized VIVA, but not an acronym according to program director Dieter Gorny) was a German free-to-air music television channel, first broadcast on 1 December 1993. The channel was intended to compete against MTV Europe and was the sole German-language music TV channel after the closure of musicbox in 1988, while MTV was only broadcast in English until the introduction of MTV Germany in 1997. It was also supposed to focus more on German music and pop culture while MTV only broadcast anglophone music by artists primarily from North America, the United Kingdom, Ireland and Australia.

After years of competition for audience share, MTV Networks Europe eventually acquired VIVA on 14 January 2005, after it had exhausted its own efforts for superior ratings. MTV operated VIVA channels in Austria, Germany, Hungary, Ireland, Poland, Switzerland and the United Kingdom.

In June 2018, Viacom announced that it would shut down all VIVA operations worldwide at the end of that year.

The channel ceased to broadcast at 14:00 on 31 December 2018, being replaced by Comedy Central.

== History ==
=== Initial concept ===
The concept behind VIVA originated in 1992, when major record labels were frustrated by MTV Europe's decision to program mostly English-language music videos to the Germanophone markets, in what was perceived as its refusal to play major German-speaking artists. Executives at US media giant Time Warner, keen on increasing their market share of its music repertoire and business in Germany, planned the new TV station in 1992. Eventually, they recruited DoRo Productions, producers of music videos for notable acts such as Queen, The Rolling Stones, David Bowie, in the design of the music channel. Time Warner executives Tom McGrath and Peter Bogner assembled a group of record labels that included its very own Warner Music, EMI Music, Polygram Records and Sony Television along with Frank Otto, Apax Partners, and Austrian producers Rudi Dolezal and Hannes Rossacher of DoRo Productions. In a concept paper of Time Warner, Peter Bogner analyzed MTV's market position as vulnerable, and "while MTV is betting on a diet of pure Anglo-American video clips, VIVA should broadcast at least 40% more German music."

VIVA started broadcasting on 1 December 1993, as Germany's second music channel, after the first channel, musicbox, became Tele 5 in 1988 and its lineup, which was initially dominated by music, was gradually reduced. VIVA advanced to fill this gap. The broadcasting studio was located in the rented rooms of Bertelsmann's VOX studios in Cologne-Ossendorf. Originally, VIVA was started by the media giant Time Warner to boost the German business of its company Warner Music Group. The Bertelsmann Music Group (BMG) declined an invitation to take part in VIVA because they feared possible reprisals from their competitor MTV Europe and were not convinced that a German-language music channel could prevail against MTV. Undeterred by this, Time Warner executives Tom McGrath and Peter Bogner, along with their competitors Sony, PolyGram and EMI Music, and media executive Michael Oplesch (VIVA GF, MTV GF, MME GF), founded producer Rudi Dolezal and Hannes Rossacher, the founders of the TV production company Me, Myself & Eye (MME), Christoph Post, Jörg A. Hoppe and Marcus O. Rosenmüller, and the media lawyer Helge Sasse the Viva Medien GmbH. The first VJs included the moderators Stefan Raab and Heike Makatsch, who were still unknown at the time. After their time at VIVA, they rose to become successful film and television personalities in Germany.

From its beginning, the channel broadcast from Cologne. The studios were in Cologne-Mülheim for most years, in the same building as Brainpool. The first (and subsequently last in 2018) music video played was "Zu geil für diese Welt" (Too Awesome for This World). The channel's profile was largely defined by Rudi Dolezal and Hannes Rossacher (DoRo production). In 1994, market leadership was achieved for the first time (according to their own statements). After MTV re-entered free TV, VIVA temporarily lost the upper hand. From the middle of 2004, however, VIVA was again slightly in the lead in terms of viewership in the advertising-relevant target group.

VIVA became an immediate success with the audience, while ultimately providing German artists with a music channel that could expose their music to the German audience.

=== Competing with MTV ===
With Dieter Gorny eventually as its second managing director on board, VIVA applied for cable carriage licenses in the various German states. DoRo Productions designed the original programming format which while clearly a music video channel, sought to differentiate itself from MTV not just by having a German-speaking voice, but by speaking directly to the differences in pop culture between Germany and the anglophone MTV.

Before launching the channel, the labels offered to fund MTV in a German-speaking version but were rejected by MTV management at the time, as it espoused a "one world, one language" programming philosophy (at least in Europe, as the Latin American channels used Spanish and Portuguese).

On 21 March 1995, a second channel, Viva Zwei ("VIVA Two"), was created, initially a channel for classic music videos which later focused on lesser known and more independently produced music, mostly indie, alternative rock, metal, electronic music and alternative hip hop.

However, Viva Zwei was not financially successful, and on 7 January 2002, it was replaced by VIVA Plus, a channel dedicated purely to pop and mainstream music for a younger target audience. Nonetheless, some Viva Zwei formats managed to continue on Viva Plus for some time, and Fast Forward was even included in the main channel's program. VIVA Plus itself was discontinued on 14 January 2007 and got replaced by Comedy Central Deutschland the next day.

=== Comet Awards ===
Since 1995, VIVA held an annual pop music award ceremony known as the Comet. During the 2003 award ceremonies, VIVA openly expressed an anti-Iraq War view. The awards were last held in 2011. The 2012 awards ceremony was cancelled as Viacom wanted to focus more on the MTV Europe Music Awards instead. In 2013, it was cancelled again. Although the awards were never officially canceled altogether, they weren't held ever since.

=== MTV's response to VIVA ===
After MTV introduced a German-language version of itself in 1997, the competition between the two stations increased. VIVA was widely perceived as the more mainstream-oriented channel for younger viewers, while MTV Germany was directed at youths and young adults with some edgier programming. In 2003, VIVA received bad press after it was discovered that it had given Universal Music an unfair advantage in the placement of their music videos.

=== MTV owner acquires VIVA ===
On 24 June 2004, VIVA was acquired (for the sum of €310 million) by Viacom International, which also owns MTV, thus ending the VIVA-MTV rivalry and fostering cooperation instead. After the acquisition of VIVA by Viacom, MTV Germany shifted to mostly broadcasting reality and comedy shows. VIVA became the music channel with chart shows and other similar programs which were mostly directed at a mainstream audience. Although the new owners had outlined that, with four channels under their helm, they were going to "offer a greater variety of content for a wider public and a larger range of tastes" while still promising to continue the "strong national and cultural identity" of the channel, Viacom introduced a programming scheme that allowed the station to be run by just 40 people, making many previous employees redundant. The studios and headquarters in Cologne were closed in March 2005 (Viacom became the sole owner of the former VIVA Media properties in January), and from then on VIVA broadcast from the same studios as MTV Germany in Berlin.

From January 2011, under a major shakeup at MTV Networks Germany, VIVA continued to be part of MTV Networks Germany's free-to-air package, and the channel became the main music and entertainment brand within Germany. VIVA was complemented by its sister channels MTV Germany and MTV Brand New, which then became paid TV, although in late 2017 MTV Germany was returned to free TV. VIVA Germany received a new look and on-air branding on 1 January 2011. The new look of VIVA joined the four triangles of the new logo into one triangle, putting the angle of VIVA into one heart.

Starting 22 March 2011, VIVA broadcast only in 16:9. Programs produced in 4:3 were cropped to 14:9 and black bars were added left and right. VIVA HD Germany, a simulcast in 1080i high-definition, launched on 16 May 2011. It was available via IPTV from Deutsche Telekom.

On 1 January 2012, VIVA shut down its analog signal from Astra 19,2º East.

=== Discontinuation ===
In June 2018, Viacom announced its decision to discontinue VIVA at the end of the year. Viacom general manager Mark Specht said in an interview that the channel is profitable, but that Viacom wants to focus on its three core brands, MTV, Comedy Central and Nickelodeon, as it sees bigger growth opportunities there. The slot was filled by Comedy Central, which had already shared its slot with VIVA since 2014 and was to become a 24-hour channel. Comedy Central had so far been broadcast only during evening and night hours, while VIVA was broadcast at daytime.

On 31 December 2018 at 14:00 CET, the channel aired its final music video, "Viva Forever", by the Spice Girls, which had also been aired when the sister channel in the UK and Ireland ceased broadcast earlier in the year. Shortly after, the channel aired end-of-broadcast shows, featuring several music artists, former hosts and other celebrities (including DJ BoBo, Loona, Alex Christensen, Udo Lindenberg and Oliver Pocher) saying their goodbyes. After the end-of-broadcast specials concluded, the channel aired the music video of "Zu geil für diese Welt" by Die Fantastischen Vier (which was also the first music video that was aired back in 1993) and then faded to a black screen featuring the old 2002-2004 VIVA logo with the words "Rest In Peace" and "1993-2018" below. Shortly after, the channel faded to dark, followed by the startup of Comedy Central, officially ending 25 years of broadcast. However, the broadcast was unintentionally "extended"; in the first seconds of the Comedy Central broadcast, the station briefly failed to transition from the VIVA logo.

== Programming ==
- #Facebookclips
- #Tweetclips
- 10 Dinge, die ich an dir hasse
- 180°
- Alle hassen Chris
- American Dad!
- Aqua Teen Hunger Force
- Archer
- Assy McGee
- Awkward – Mein sogenanntes Leben
- Beavis and Butt-Head
- Blue Mountain State
- Britney and Kevin: Chaotic
- Bully Beatdown
- Catfish – Verliebte im Netz
- Crash Canyon
- Criss Angel Mindfreak
- Die Pinguine aus Madasgcar
- Die Ren & Stimpy Show
- Death Valley
- Degrassi
- Deutschstunde
- Detektiv Conan
- Drawn Together
- The Dudesons in America
- Eure VIVA Lieblingsklicks
- Family Guy
- Feat.
- Faust des Zen
- Flash Prank
- Friendzone
- Futurama
- Game One
- Get the Clip
- Glee
- Geordie Shore
- Good Morning Saturday
- Good Morning Sunday
- Guy Code
- Jungs mit Kindern
- Happy End
- Happy Tree Friends
- The Hard Times of RJ Berger
- The Hasselhoffs
- Hollys Welt
- Ich war mal dick
- InuYasha: Ein feudales Märchen
- Jackass
- Jersey Shore
- Keeping Up with the Kardashians
- Kendra
- Kenny gegen Spenny
- Kesha: Mein verrücktes schönes Leben
- Killer-Karaoke
- Liebe oder nicht
- Love Test 3 in 1
- Loveline
- Made
- Mein Leben als Liz
- Meine super süße Weltklasse
- Melissa und Joey
- Mixery Massive Music
- Most Wanted 2000s
- MTV at the Movies
- MTV Europe Music Awards
- MTV Home
- MTV Movie Awards
- MTV Top 100 (until December 2017 as VIVA Top 100)
- MTV Unplugged
- MTV Video Music Awards
- MTV World Stage
- Music
- My Kid Is Gonna Be Famous
- Narben
- Naruto
- Neu
- Neu um 9
- Night Sounds
- Night Sounds Party (on weekend instead of Night Sounds)
- Nitrozirkus
- O.C., Kalifornien
- One Piece
- One Tree Hill
- Party, Bruder!
- The Pauly D Project
- Pimp My Ride
- Plain Jane
- Promi-Deathmatch
- Punk'd
- Echte Männer von Hollywood
- Retro Charts
- Ridiculousness
- Riesig
- Robot Chicken
- Unhöfliches Rohr
- Sailor Moon
- Savage U
- Scandalicious
- The Short List
- Skins
- SMS Guru
- Snooki & Jwoww
- South Park
- Special Charts
- SpongeBob Schwammkopf
- Streichelte
- Style Star
- Supercharts
- Teen Mom 2
- Then and Now
- Todd und das Buch des Bösen
- Tsubasa: Reservoir Chronik
- Ugly Americans
- Undateable
- Underemployed
- Unglücksdatum
- Versuchsgelände
- VIVA Charts... 1 Year Ago
- VIVA Charts... 5 Years Ago
- VIVA Club Rotation
- VIVA Comet
- VIVA Fahrstuhlmusik
- VIVA Live!
- VIVA Quiz
- VIVA Sounds
- VIVA Spezial
- VIVA Streaming Charts
- VIVA Top 20 Singlecharts
- VIVA Top 40 Singlecharts
- VIVA Top 100
- VIVA Wecker
- VIVApedia
- VIVA's Most Played Charts
- VIVA's Most Wanted Charts
- WakeBrothers
- Your Choice
- Young & Married
- Zoey 101

=== Presenters ===
VJ	Year	Shows						
Mola Adebisi	1993–2004	Interaktiv; VIVA Top 100; Club R'n’B						
Bibiana Ballbè Serra	2001–2003	Planet VIVA; Chartsurfer; Was geht ab?; Ritmo; Inside						
Aleksandra Bechtel	1993–1999	Was geht ab?; Interaktiv						
Nils Bokelberg	1993–1998	Was geht ab?						
Ricky Breitengraser	2000	Interaktiv Spezial						
Sabine Christ	1994–1999	Housefrau						
Rocco Clein † (Stefan Bickerich)	1993–2001	Neuigkeiten						
Phil Daub	1994–2001	Metalla; Planet VIVA						
Daisy Dee (Daisy Rollocks)	1996–2003	Club Rotation Dance Charts; Ritmo						
Isabel Dziobek	1993–1996	Freunde der Nacht als "VIVA TWINS“ |-	Natalie Dziobek	1993–1996	Freunde der Nacht als "VIVA TWINS“ |-	Mate Galić	1994–1997	Housefrau; VIVA Trance
Daniel Hartwig	1998–1999	Interaktiv						
Klaas Heufer-Umlauf	2004–2009	Klaas' Wochenshow; VIVA Live!; Retro Charts; NEU; Interaktiv; VIVA News						
Gülcan Kamps	2003–2010	Interaktiv; 17; VIVA News; NEU; Shibuya; VIVA Live!; VIVA Top 100						
Markus Kavka	1997	Metalla						
Johanna Klum	2005–2012	VIVA Top 20; VIVA Top 100; Retro Charts; VIVA Live!; NEU; 17; Jung, sexy, sucht!						
Lukas Koch	2001–2002	Voll VIVA; Was geht ab?; Chartsurfer; Neu bei VIVA						
Sebastian König	2006–2009	Ringtone Charts; Straßencharts; Mixery Massive Music; NEU; VIVA Top 20; Special Charts; VIVA Live!						
Joel Korenzecher	1999	World of Bits						
Steffi Krause	1999–2000	VIVA Wecker						
Ralph Michael Krieger	1993–1994	Jam; Metalla; Neu bei VIVA						
Nadine Krüger	1997–1999	Film ab; Interaktiv; Jam						
Sarah Kuttner	2001–2005	Interaktiv; Sarah Kuttner – Die Show; Albumcharts						
Frank Lämmermann	1998–1999	Lämmermann Live						
Liza Li	2007–2008	Straßencharts; VIVA Top 20; VIVA Top 100						

VJ	Year	Shows
Milka Loff Fernandes	1999–2004	Inside; Interaktiv; Was geht ab?; Face it!
Heike Makatsch	1993–1997	Interaktiv; Heikes Hausbesuche
MC Rene	1999–2002	Mixery Raw Deluxe
Nova Meierhenrich	2000–2001	Inside
Markus Meske	2002	Neuigkeiten
Enie van de Meiklokjes (Doreen Grochowski)	1996–2000	Chartsurfer; Was geht ab?; Neu bei VIVA
Matthias Opdenhövel	1993–1997	Interaktiv; Neuigkeiten
Nela Panghy-Lee	2004–2005	Club Rotation Dance Charts; Neu bei VIVA
Minh-Khai Phan-Thi	1995–1998	Interaktiv; Minh-Khai & Friends
Oliver Pocher	1999–2005	Alles Pocher; Interaktiv; Trash Top 100; Was geht ab?; Planet VIVA; Chartsurfer
Stefan Raab	1993–1998	Ma' kuck'n; Vivasion
Janin Reinhardt	2001–2005	Film ab; Inside; Interaktiv; 17
René le Riche	1994–1996	Neuigkeiten; Jam
Tyron Ricketts	1996–2000	Word Cup
Charlotte Roche	1998–2005	Fast Forward
Niels Ruf	1998–2001	Kamikaze
Falk "Hawkeye" Schacht	2001–2004	Supreme; Mixery Raw Deluxe
Tobias Schlegl	1995–2004	Interaktiv; Kewl; Schlegl; Das jüngste Gericht
Jessica Schwarz	2000–2003	Film ab; Interaktiv
Axel Terporten	1993–1997	Neuigkeiten
Martin Tietjen	2006	Ringtone Charts
Shirin Valentine	1995–1999	VIVA Wecker
Nadine Vasta	2009–2011	VASTA; VIVA Live!; VIVA Top 100; NEU
Jessica Wahls	2003–2005	17; Interaktiv; Your Stars for X-Mas
Annemarie Warnkross	2004–2005	Ringtone Charts; Club Rotation Dance Charts
Collien Fernandes	2003–2015	Mixery Massive Music; Neu; Ringtone Charts; Special Charts; Straßencharts; VIVA Live!; VIVA Top 20; VIVA Top 100
Palina Rojinski	2011–2015	VIVA Top 100; VIVAPedia
Romina Becks	2011–2015	VIVA Top 100; VIVAPedia
Jan Köppen	2006–2018	VIVA Liederladen Top 20; Ringtone Charts; VIVA Top 100; Neu; VIVA Live!; Retro Charts; VIVApedia; MTV Top 100
Melissa Lee	2015–2018	VIVA Top 100
Hanna Scholz	2017–2018	VIVA Top 100
Uli Brase	2018	VIVA Top 100

==== Presenters from MTV ====
VJ	Year	Shows
Daniel Budiman	2011–2014	Game One (MTV show)
Simon Krätschmer	2011–2014	Game One (MTV show)
Nils Bomhoff	2011–2014	Game One (MTV show)
Etienne Gardé	2011–2014	Game One (MTV show)

=== Logos ===
First logo used from 1 December 1993 to 19 April 1998

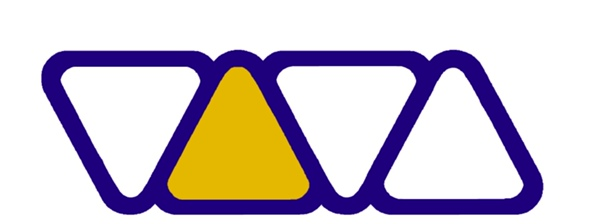
Redesigned first logo used from 20 April 1998 to 31 December 2001

Logo used from 1 January 2002 to 29 August 2004

Logo used from 30 August 2004 to 31 December 2010. From 5 November 2007 it was shown in orange, green and blue, before then it was white.

Note that from 1 December 2018 to 31 December 2018, each VIVA logo design was displayed, cycling every two minutes, as a tribute to VIVA due to its shutdown.

== VIVA in other countries ==
Viacom also operated VIVA channels in Austria (VIVA Austria), Hungary (VIVA Hungary), Poland (VIVA Polska), the United Kingdom and Ireland (Viva UK and Ireland) and Switzerland (VIVA Switzerland). All of these channels are now defunct as well and have since been replaced with Comedy Central- or MTV-branded channels. "Tele-3" (now TV3) in Lithuania broadcast the "VIVA TOP 100" show on Saturdays between 1994 and 1996. This experience later inspired Lithuanian television stations to create local equivalents. For example, in 2001–2002, the Lithuanian National Broadcaster (LRT), in cooperation with German producers, started broadcasting an official Lithuanian version of the VIVA show, which was hosted on Friday evenings by Aurimas Dautartas.

== See also ==
- TMF, a similar defunct channel to VIVA that was available in the Netherlands and Flemish-speaking parts of Belgium before being replaced by localized versions of MTV. Both VIVA and TMF are operated by Viacom International Media Networks Europe.
- Viva Zwei
