= VIVA Plus =

German music TV channel

- Country: Germany
- Broadcast area: Germany, Austria, Switzerland
- Headquarters: Berlin, Germany

Programming
- Language(s): German
- Picture format: 576i (4:3 SDTV)

Ownership
- Owner: Viacom

History
- Launched: 7 January 2002; 23 years ago
- Closed: 14 January 2007; 18 years ago

Links
- Website: www.vivaplus.tv

VIVA Plus was a German music television channel that went on air on 7 January 2002 at 13:00 based in Cologne, Germany. It was the successor to VIVA Zwei and was initially managed by VIVA Media AG and later by Viacom, based in Berlin, Germany. On 14 January 2007, the channel was discontinued and replaced by Comedy Central Deutschland, which began broadcasting the following day.

== History ==
When the TV channel started broadcasting, VIVA Media AG held 51% and AOL Time Warner 49% until the takeover by Viacom in the summer of 2004. The station's initial claim was to become the "CNN of music television". The programme was dominated by information treadmills, so-called "crawls", and the hourly VIVA Plus News. In addition, there were correspondents in London, Los Angeles, Berlin and Hamburg who reported daily on current topics from the cities. The daily programme Cologne Day was also broadcast from the VIVA Plus studios in Cologne, to which various musicians, among others, were invited. Further correspondents were planned for the summer, reporting from Barcelona, Munich, Frankfurt am Main and Tokyo. However, the station's idea did not seem to work out and nothing came of further plans, as the expected group sales were not achieved and the largest single shareholder AOL Time Warner put greater commitment into a new concept - that of a pure clip station, like the then competitor MTV2 Pop.

VIVA Plus was then radically transformed and the concept of an interactive channel, which had been pursued until the end, in which viewers were involved through tele-voting. From then on, the VIVA Plus programme was characterised by the interactive programme Get the Clip and its variations grouped by musical genre. Get the Clip was a kind of playlist that could be compiled by the viewer via SMS or interactive voice response (IVR). If the vote was sent by SMS, a short message could also be sent, which was then shown on the TV programme. Aside from the normal Get The Clip which was broadcast during the daytime and dedicated to mainstream pop music, there were also special formats that were broadcast once or twice a week in the evening and were dedicated to special styles of music, e.g. Get The Clip Rock, Get The Clip Hip Hop, etc..

The channel was then optically adapted to the main VIVA channel. The programme scheme slowly recovered and was gradually expanded with new non-hosted formats before VIVA Media AG was taken over by Viacom in 2005 and most of these formats were discontinued. Recently, three different call-in programmes were broadcast on VIVA Plus in the style of 9Live, accounting for up to 40% of daily broadcasting time.

On the morning of 14 January 2007, Viacom replaced VIVA Plus with Comedy Central Deutschland. Since then, the main format of VIVA Plus, Get the Clip, was transferred to VIVA. Since January 2011, the programme has only been broadcast twice a day from Monday to Friday and was no longer shown at weekends. The last edition of the programme ran on 19 February 2014.

As a result of the steadily increasing number of call-in broadcasts and ringtone commercials on the VIVA Plus programme and the imminent end of broadcasting operations, former VIVA employee Mola Adebisi, among others, founded the music channel iMusic1, which initially followed the Get the Clip principle in its entirety.

== Hosts ==
- Alex
- Chris Multer
- Daniel Ende
- Futschi Matheis
- Jan Hendrik Becker
- Julia Althoff
- Katjuschka Altmann
- Michael Wigge
- Mirjam Weichselbraun
- Simone Bargetze
- Tobias Trosse
- Yousef Hammoudah

== Logos ==
Logo until October 2002

Logo until August 2004

Last used logo
