= VH-1 (German TV channel) =

German television channel

Programming
- Picture format: 576i (4:3 SDTV)

Ownership
- Owner: MTV Networks International

History
- Launched: 10 March 1995; 31 years ago
- Closed: 1 May 2001; 25 years ago
- Replaced by: MTV2 Pop

Links
- Website: http://www.vh1.de (defunct)

VH-1 Deutschland was a localised German version of the Viacom channel VH1 that was on air from 1995 until 2001. The programme was operated by Me, Myself & Eye Entertainment GmbH, the former editorial office of Tele 5's predecessor musicbox, in cooperation with MTV Networks Europe.

In contrast to the other language versions, VH-1 Deutschland had to use the January 1985 – 1987 US logo rather than the then-current logo of the US incarnation and consequently a different spelling, as the ARD saw too many parallels to its own logo in the original logo.

== History ==
VH-1 Deutschland started at 8:00 p.m. on Friday, 10 March 1995 for twelve hours a day. VH-1 used the downtime of the British version of Nickelodeon on the Astra satellite system. In fact, VH-1 initially only show a four-hour programme, which was repeated twice during the night. With the launch of the new Eutelsat Hot Bird 1 satellite at 13 degrees East in April of the same year, the programme was extended to 24 hours and converted into a full programme. The host of the first hour was Daniel Kovac. The first clip played was Musique Non Stop by Kraftwerk.

As part of the encryption of MTV Europe on 1 July 1995, VH-1 also encrypted its signal on the Eutelsat satellite. The remaining 12-hour programme window on ASTRA was switched off on the same day. The channel was encrypted on cable a few months later.

The focus was on pop and rock video clips from the 1960s throughout the 1990s for an audience of 25 to 49 years old. In the initial phase, the programme included imported VH-1 formats such as Storytellers, Pop-Up Video and Behind the Music, concerts and recordings from the archive and telecasts of live events such as the VH-1 Big In Award, as well as numerous self-produced formats with a relatively high standard of music journalism, such as the Musikalische Quintett. The host was Alan Bangs, further critics were Götz Alsmann and Heinz-Rudolf Kunze.

The VH-1DERLAND website (www.vh1.de) went online in 1995 when the programme was launched, but removed a few years later. It was the first website of a German television station. Curiously, the website went online a few days until the station.

In 1996, as a reaction to the start-up losses of around 60 million Deutsche Mark, a conversion to a younger-oriented programme titled MTV2 was openly considered for the first time.

The then-competitor VIVA launched VIVA II eleven days after VH-1. targeting the same demographic. Meanwhile, VH-1's management suggested that a merger with VIVA II would make financial sense. Instead, VIVA rejected the unsuccessful concept in favour of a more progressive and alternative format, VIVA Zwei.

A budget cut in October 1997 meant that almost all live-presented programmes had to be cancelled; a large part of its workforce was laid off. Afterwards, the station was dominated by pure videoclips and US formats. Alan Bangs and Susanne Reimann, both then VJs of the 360 Grad programme, resisted the reformatting.

Ronny's Pop Show made a comeback on VH-1 in the same year. In 1998, the teletext, called VH-1 Text, was introduced.

On 7 August 2000, Bauer Media Group announced its intentions to take over 50% of the shares in VH-1 and the design of the programme from 08.00 to 20.00 hours. A separate channel was to be dedicated to the Bravo TV programme for this purpose. However, these plans were rejected on 11 December of the same year.

On 1 May 2001, VH-1 was converted into the much younger-oriented mainstream MTV2 Pop channel as the "debut project" of the then new MTV managing director Catherine Mühlemann. The final video on 30 April 2001 was Money for Nothing by the Dire Straits. MTV2 Pop took over all cable frequencies from VH-1 at midnight with One More Time by Daft Punk.

Me, Myself & Eye Entertainment GmbH also took over editorial tasks in the early years of MTV2 Pop. In contrast to its predecessor, however, the programme was played out by the MTV servers in London, United Kingdom.

== Distribution ==
The programme was usually received unencrypted only on cable networks. On analogue, the channel was aired only temporarily via Astra 19.2°E from 20:00 to 00:00 on the space of sister channel Nickelodeon Deutschland. VH-1 initially remained on the satellite site, although the past "main tenant" Nickelodeon ceased airing on 31 May 1998 at 20:00 hours. Despite this, VH-1 kept its limited transmission times, although Nickelodeon's space was replaced by a testcard informing viewers of its closure until August. MTV Central completely took over the frequency on 1 January 1999. From then on, VH-1 was no longer broadcast via satellite until it was completely shut down.

For satellite viewers, it was temporarily only possible to receive the programme in the then new digital standard. Digitally, VH-1 was only offered in encrypted form via the DF1 platform. After the merger of DF1 and Premiere to form Premiere World, both VH-1 and MTV Central were no longer represented in the programme portfolio.

The reason for this limited reception situation via satellite was an exclusive contract with the then cable network operator Deutsche Telekom, which wanted to create a customer incentive with an unencrypted transmission of VH-1. Despite everything, VH-1 could also only be received on an hourly basis in many cable networks. A similar agreement between the parent company Viacom Inc. and the DF1 operator, the Kirch Group, for all Viacom programmes was rejected by Viacom.
