= MTV (Swiss TV channel) =

MTV Switzerland
- Country: Switzerland
- Broadcast area: Switzerland
- Headquarters: Küsnacht ZH, Switzerland

Programming
- Language: German
- Picture format: 576i (16:9 SDTV); 1080i (HDTV)

Ownership
- Owner: Paramount Networks EMEAA
- Sister channels: Comedy Central Switzerland; Nickelodeon (Switzerland)

History
- Launched: 1 April 2008; 18 years ago
- Replaced: MTV Germany
- Closed: 12 January 2022; 4 years ago
- Replaced by: MTV Germany

Links
- Website: www.mtv.ch

MTV Switzerland was a localised version of MTV for the German-speaking market in that country. The channel began as an opt-out feed of MTV Central in 2004 featuring localized advertising and sponsorship, but as of April 2009 the channel will feature more local programming. Following the ceasing of VIVA Switzerland, MTV Switzerland was relaunched in April 2009 with more localized features, replacing MTV Germany in Switzerland, to coincide ina dedicated website MTV.ch was launched in January 2010, alongside new music programming including a Swiss-German version of Brand New (Brand: neu). VIVA Switzerland was later revived in 2012.

The majority of programming on MTV Switzerland is either a simulcast or delayed simulcast of MTV Germany with localized advertising, sponsorship, promos and events highlights relevant to the German-Swiss market.

MTV.ch featured the localized album and singles chart.

== History ==
On 1 April 2008 the Swiss version of MTV started.

On 5 October 2010, MTV announced that MTV Germany and MTV Austria will be remain as pay-tv service only. An exception is Switzerland, in which the German-speaking MTV Switzerland continued to be free-to-air.

On 1 July 2011, the new broadcasting logo from the United States was also taken over in Switzerland.

== Current local shows ==
- Brand: neu
- Crispy News
- MTV News

== Current VJs ==
- Jubaira (previously on VIVA Switzerland)
