= MTV2 (disambiguation) =

MTV2 is an American television channel launched in 1996.

MTV2 may also refer to:

- MTV2 (Canada), a Canadian television channel launched in 2008
- MTV2 Pop, a German channel replaced by Nickelodeon Germany
- MTV2 Europe, later known as MTV Rocks, a television channel in the UK and Ireland
