= Nickelodeon Schweiz =

Swiss children's TV channel

- Logo used since 23 August 2023 (Note: The logo's wordmark has been in use since March 2010. Additionally, there is a variant meant to be used for white backgrounds; the main variant has a white wordmark in conjunction with a fully orange splat.)
- Country: Switzerland
- Network: Paramount Networks EMEAA

Programming
- Language: German
- Picture format: 1080i HDTV

Ownership
- Owner: CH Media (under license from Paramount)
- Parent: Nickelodeon Group
- Sister channels: Nick Jr. Nicktoons

History
- Launched: 1 April 2009 (Note: Not including the block on SF2, which ran from 28 September 1998 to 16 September 2003.)
- Former names: Nickelodeon Schweiz (2010–2017); Nick Schweiz (2017–2023)

Links
- Website: www.nick.ch

Nickelodeon Schweiz is a Swiss German-language pay television channel centred towards children. It was launched on 1 April 2009 timesharing with VIVA Switzerland, replacing the German feed that was available in Switzerland. The programming schedule is the same as Nickelodeon Germany feed, with commercial breaks from the country being replaced by local ads.

In March 2010, Nick was rebranded. From 1 January 2011 until 30 September 2014, Nickelodeon Switzerland timeshared with Comedy Central.

Before Nickelodeon Switzerland was launched as a TV channel it was a 7-hour programming block on the Swiss channel SF2 which used to broadcast from 28 September 1998 -16 September 2003 after the shutdown of the German channel on 31 May 1998. It was replaced by another programming block called Junior.

"Nickelodeon Schweiz" logo used from 31 March 2010 – 28 June 2017

Since 1 October 2021, the channel has been run by CH Media under license from Paramount, timesharing with the new channel 7+ Family.

The channel was rebranded back to Nickelodeon on 23 August 2023.

"Nick Schweiz" logo used from 28 June 2017 – 23 August 2023

Splat logo used since 2023

This is the only remaining Nickelodeon Germany subfeed following the shutdown of the Austrian subfeed.

== See also ==
- Nickelodeon France, French-speaking version, also distributed in Switzerland
- List of Nickelodeon international channels
- Nickelodeon
- Nickelodeon Germany
- Nickelodeon Austria
