= Sarah Kuttner =

German television presenter and author (born 1979)

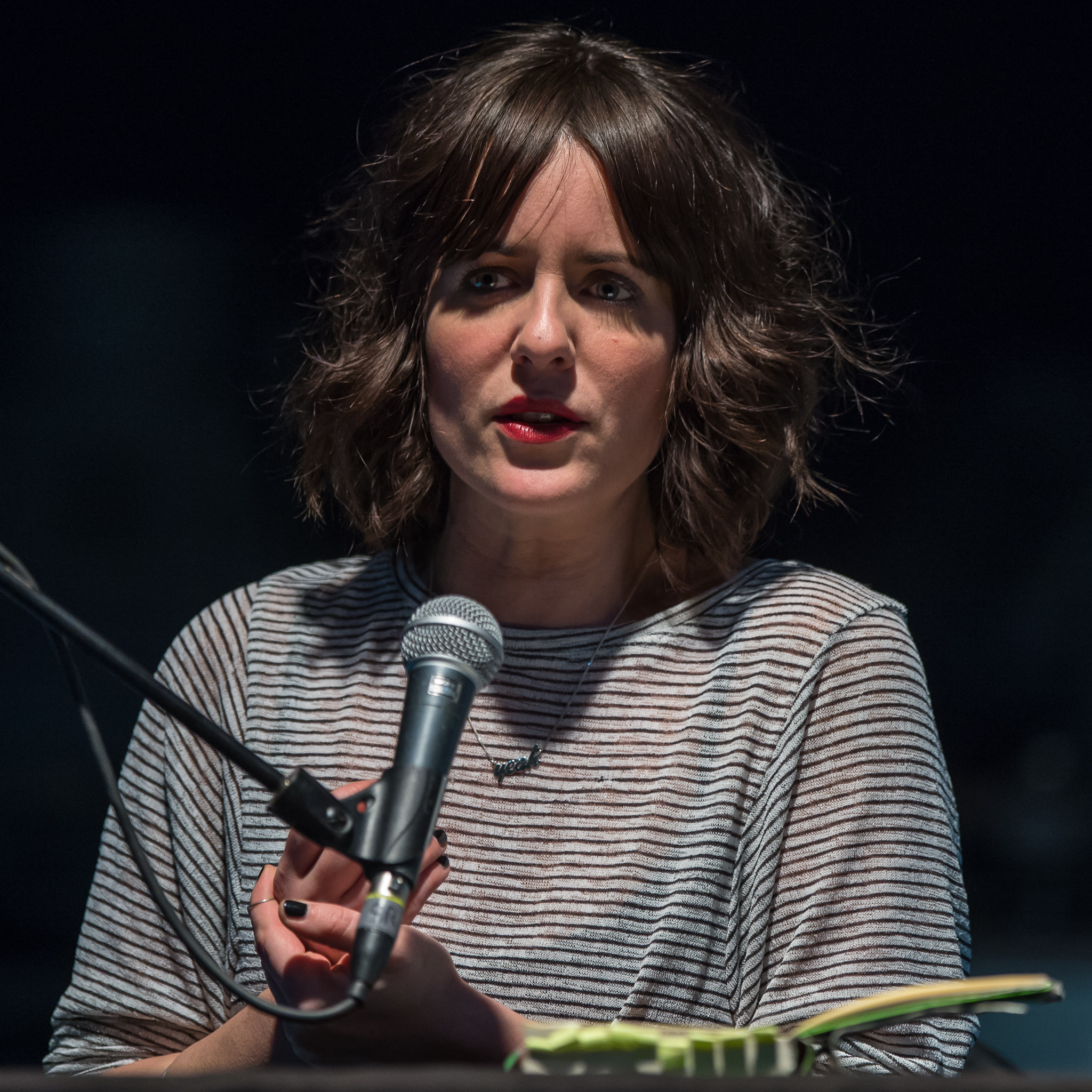
- Kuttner in 2017
- Born: 29 January 1979 (age 47); Berlin, East Germany
- Occupations: Television presenter, author, comedian
- Years active: 2001–present

Sarah Kuttner (born 29 January 1979) is a German television presenter, author, and podcaster.

== Biography ==
Kuttner was born in Berlin. Her father is famed radio host Jürgen Kuttner. She has regularly appeared on the music television channel VIVA since November 2001 after being selected out of 1500 other participants in a casting held in summer of that year. Her popularity increased rapidly and in August 2004 she started to host her own show called Sarah Kuttner – Die Show, a variation on the popular late show concept with comedy, a sidekick (Sven Schuhmacher), talk guests and musical guests. After Viacom bought VIVA in 2005, her show was moved to MTV Germany and renamed to "Kuttner." with no dramatic changes in concept or crew. Production was relocated from Cologne to Berlin. Kuttner announced the show's cancellation due to high production costs and low ratings in May 2006.

She also co-hosted (with Jörg Pilawa) the show "Germany 12 Points", the German pre-selection for the Eurovision Song Contest on publicly owned channel ARD on 19 March 2004.

Kuttner wrote a weekly column in the national daily newspaper Süddeutsche Zeitung and a monthly column in music magazine Musikexpress. Both were compiled in two books, "Das oblatendünne Eis des halben Zweidrittelwissens" (March 2006) and "Die anstrengende Daueranwesenheit der Gegenwart" (March 2007). "Das oblatendünne Eis" enjoyed a moderate success in Germany with mixed but largely positive reviews. Especially TV personality Harald Schmidt emphasized his admiration for the book. No figures or reviews for "Die anstrengende Daueranwesenheit" are yet available.

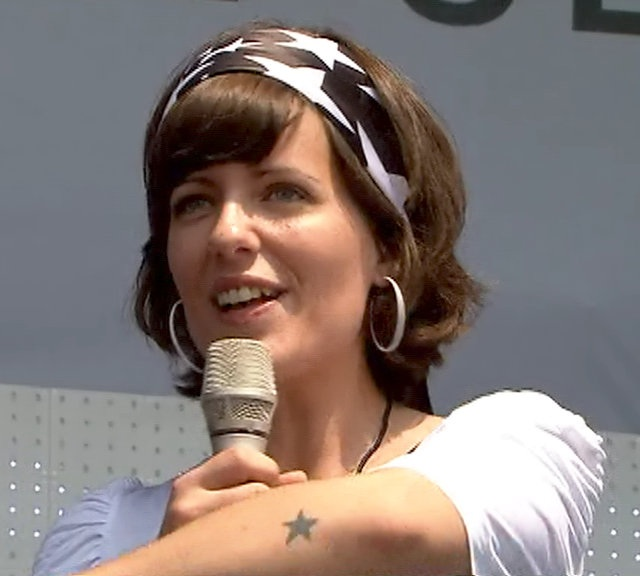
Kuttner in 2007

In 2009 Kuttner released her first novel Mängelexemplar, which dealt with the topic of depression. The film Too Hard to Handle (2016) is based on the book. In November 2011, her second book Wachstumsschmerz was released. Kuttner's second novel is about the pains of growing up.

In 2006 Kuttner accepted her first and so far only acting job, providing the German voice of "Red" in the dubbed version of the movie Hoodwinked!.

Beginning 11 November 2007 she started hosting a weekly radio show, Kuttner & Kuttner together with her father Jürgen Kuttner, on Radio Eins in Berlin.

In 2011 Kuttner hosted a talk show called "Ausflug mit Kuttner" of which three episodes where shot. In this show she interviewed celebrities while going on typical Sunday trips with them.

== Publications ==
- Das oblatendünne Eis des halben Zweidrittelwissens. Kolumnen. Fischer, Frankfurt am Main 2006, ISBN 3-596-17108-3
- Die anstrengende Daueranwesenheit der Gegenwart. Kolumnen. Fischer, Frankfurt am Main 2007, ISBN 3-596-17533-X
- Mängelexemplar. Roman. Fischer, Frankfurt am Main 2009, ISBN 978-3-10-042205-7
- Wachstumsschmerz. Roman. Fischer, Frankfurt am Main 2011, ISBN 978-3-10-042206-4
