= Alex Stenzel =

German painter (born 1965)

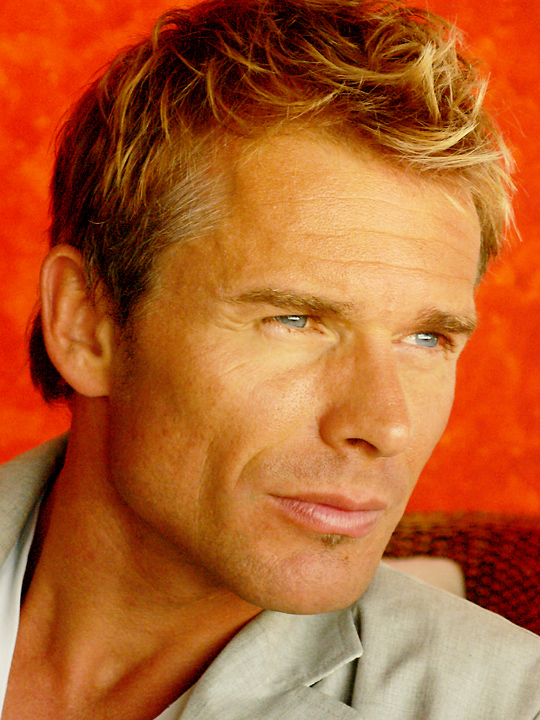
- Alex Stenzel, 2006
- Born: 26 January 1965 (age 61); Recklinghausen, Germany
- Website: alexstenzel.com

Alex Stenzel (born 1965) is a German-American artist and former fashion designer who is known for a new style of abstract overpainted photographs and innovative designs in architecture, fashion and product design.

Stenzel was born in Recklinghausen, Westphalia and grew up in Oer-Erkenschwick, a small coal-mining town on the northern fringe of the Ruhr district, one of the largest industrial areas in Europe. Stenzel was also a world class athlete: tennis(1983 ITF Junior World Ranking No.33), mountain-bike(1987 Grundig Challenge Mountain Bike World Cup, Kaprun No.30), triathlon(1986 Ironman World Championship, Kona, Hawaii) .

Stenzel has produced many of his works in his studio in the Pacific Palisades in Los Angeles. In 2006 as an artist of extraordinary ability Stenzel was granted permanent resident status by the United States Immigration and now lives and works in the Eastern Sierras in Bishop, California.

== Work ==
=== Fashion design ===
In 1984 Stenzel age 19 started a business importing Californian surf t-shirts and in 1986 Stenzel had his own fashion line, running a company with 15 employees, designing a collection inspired by surfing and skateboarding and trademarked it Broken Glasses. As Stenzel's baggy pants and shirts established themselves in trendy boutiques in Germany, Switzerland and Austria he made his first million. In 1987 Stenzel, with his label Broken Glasses Sportswear was considered by German Vogue Magazine amongst Europe's prominent fashion designers. Stenzel appeared on posters and ads modeling for his clothing line Broken Glasses.

=== Product design ===
Stenzel owns patents trademarks, and copyrights in fields as widely ranging as fashion, general gift items, computer accessories, food products, architectural designs, screenplays, workout programs, and computer games. Stenzel has designed CD holders, piggy banks, doors and food products which have been sold at Whole Food and Walmart. In 2004, Stenzel designed and patented a bread less cucumber sandwich trademarked Gorilla Sandwich, a hollowed-out cucumber filled with such ingredients as walnuts, avocado, olives, seaweed and flax seed oil.

=== Architecture ===
In 1999, Stenzel conceived an interactive sculpture for Berlin, "B1-Be Tower 1". It was one of the earliest designs for a modern 'twisted' tower structure. Stenzel described it as a multi-story structure built of glass, steel, and video monitors, all arranged in the shape of a large crystal. On the inside, the sculpture is designed to function as a platform to connect to the Internet....Hundreds of images are beamed from behind the glass...photographs sent by e-mail...from all over the world...all serve as a reminder of the world's unity. After 9/11, a year before the memorial competition, on 9 April 2002 Stenzel wrote a letter to Mr. Whitehead at the Lower Manhattan Development Corporation, proposing to use the idea for a memorial. Stenzels' design was exhibited at the Don O'Melveny Gallery in 2002. In 2003 Stenzel entered a variation of his original design into the World Trade Center Site Memorial Competition.

=== Visual arts ===
Stenzel has produced oil paintings, collages, sculptures, photographs and overpainted photographs. In 2001 Stenzels' exhibition at the Absolute L.A. Biennial Art Invitational was exhibited at the Coleman Gallery and sponsored by the German Consulate. Stenzels' work 10 Tons was on the cover of the L.A Biennial Catalog."It is the remarkable combination and juxtaposition of nature, art history references, and man made elements, with a manipulation of space and weight, that make this new series a breakthrough–a pioneering foot pushing apart a theatrical curtain that has been opened for the first time," writes art critique, Bruce Helander of the Huffington Post. In 2002 the overpainted photograph, Shipwreck 6.0 tons was auctioned at Angel Art, Christie's Auction, hosted by Creative Artists Agency in Los Angeles. Stenzel 2002 exhibition at the Don O'Melveny gallery was reviewed by Peter Frank as LA Weekly "Art Picks of the Week". In 2014 Stenzel traded artwork with German entertainer Michael Wigge and appeared in his movie Barter for Paradise.

==== Overpainted photographs ====
For Stenzel the process of making an overpainted photograph begins by photographing the surfaces and textures of artifacts marked by time and weather. Stenzel believes that weathered artifacts exhibit distinct marks in different location in the world and has traveled extensively to hunt down unseen structures and patterns. Stenzel has been written about in the German media and books and featured in documentaries as an art nomad. On walls or rusty steel doors Stenzel finds "fractal images": colors and forms that look like an abstract painting. "A truthful moment can only be depicted with a complex fractal image as a starting point," Die Zeit. Later, in a studio, he paints over the enlarged photographs with oil. There is a perceptual shifting going in Stenzel's work without much optrickery, LA Weekly. He separates a photographic printed surface with well-balanced painted lines, and an occasional geometric shape. In 15 Tons, a painting that was exhibited at the Coleman Gallery in Los Angeles Stenzel communicated a new visual language by combining a photographic image with acrylic paint, capturing the chance visual poetry found on a common, wire-wrapped fence post out on the range. These recognizable and literal visual twists are delicately painted over to form a mysterious theatrical scrim-like curtain. Some of Stenzels paintings seem to be bundles wrapped together like a Christo knapsack with strong tight lines. There is a slight resemblance to Franz Kline's scratchy, narrow black gestures. Stenzel exhibit named 105.000 Tons at the Coleman gallery is "measured in weight" relating to his perception of space as gravitational forces. In his work Stenzel draws from a spiritual understanding learned in the Aboriginal Australian Outback. "I spent years traveling through Australia, I walked the song lines of the Aboriginal, meditated at their sacred sites and studied their rituals," said Stenzel. Stenzels' work is lively and unpredictable and he achieves this through planar abstraction that involve many modernist factors: Gesture, composition, form and color contrast, and collage. "I work in different mediums and see myself as an abstract romantic painter. When I make my overpainted photographs I start abstracting the image or object while I photograph it. I move my camera like a sculpture moves his chisel around a block of marble, I abstract it until I loose the object and just have relations of time and space. I put a layer of pigment over the photograph, I dust it basically on it. This creates a beautiful contrast between the glossy surface of the photograph and the layer of paint. This continues the process of abstraction which started already when taking the photograph. You don't know what the object is but you have a great dimensionality, it's space behind a veil,"said Stenzel.

==== Solo exhibits ====
- 2001 L.A. Biennial, Coleman Gallery, Hollywood, CA
- 2002 Don O'Melveny Gallery, Hollywood, CA
- 2007 Paul Fisher Gallery, West Palm Beach, Florida
- 2009 Seyhoun Gallery, Hollywood, CA
- 2009 Don 0'Melveny Gallery, Hollywood, CA
