= Nickelodeon Germany Kids' Choice Awards =

Nickelodeon Verleihung (1996, 1997) Nickelodeon Germany Kids' Choice Awards (2007, 2008)
- Location: Hamburg (1997); Movie Park Germany, Bottrop-Kirchhellen (2007, 2008)
- Country: Germany
- Presented by: various stars
- Hosted by: Der Wolf, Loretta Stern, various Nickelodeon hosts (1997); Elton, Bürger Lars Dietrich(2007, 2008); Nela Panghy-Lee (2008)
- Reward: KCA Blimp (1996, 1997: known as Zeppi)
- First award: 1995
- Final award: 17 October 2008

Television/radio coverage
- Network: Nickelodeon (Germany)
- Runtime: Approx. 90-120 min.

The Nickelodeon Germany Kids' Choice Awards, also known as the Nick Verleihung, was an annual awards show that aired on Nickelodeon (Germany). Its first edition was held in 1996, the final edition on 17 October 2008. As in the original version, winners receive a hollow orange blimp figurine, a logo outline for much of the network's 1984-2009 era, which also functions as a kaleidoscope. Since 2010 the original version is shown with a category for Germany, Austria and Switzerland.

== 2007 ==
=== Favourite Actor/Actress ===
Laudators were Mandy and Bahar from Monrose.

- Jimi Blue Ochsenknecht
- Susan Sideropoulos
- Alexandra Neldel
- Devon Werkheiser
- Jamie Lynn Spears (Winner)

=== Favourite Singer ===
Laudator was Josh Peck.

- LaFee (Winner)
- Christina Stürmer
- Mark Medlock
- Nevio Passaro
- Sarah Connor
- Miley Cyrus
- Taio Cruz

=== Favourite TV Show ===
Laudators were Timo and Franky from Panik (Nevada Tan).

- SpongeBob SquarePants
- Gute Zeiten, schlechte Zeiten
- Ned's Declassified School Survival Guide (Winner)
- Schloss Einstein
- Kim Possible

The prize was accepted by Devon Werkheiser.

=== Favourite Movie ===
Laudator was Gülcan Kamps.

- Pirates of the Caribbean: At World's End
- Shrek the Third
- Harry Potter and the Order of the Phoenix
- The Wild Soccer Bunch 4 (Winner)
- Surf's Up

The prize was accepted by Anne Mühlmeier, Jimi Blue Ochsenknecht and Wilson Gonzalez Ochsenknecht.

=== Favourite Music Group ===
Laudator was Nena.

- Tokio Hotel
- US5 (Winners)
- Monrose
- Nevada Tan
- Killerpilze

US5 accepted the prize incomplete, because Michael Johnson left the band shortly before the show.

=== Favourite Athlete ===
- Lukas Podolski (Winner)
- Michael Ballack
- Birgit Prinz
- Marcel Reif
- Dirk Nowitzki

=== Hidden Talent ===
This prize was chosen by the children on the show. The winner was traditionally slimed. Laudator was Susan Sideropoulos.

- Felix von Jascheroff – Become red
- Liza Li – Squint while viewing the Iris "tremble"
- Bürger Lars Dietrich – Eyebrow wave
- Nela Panghy-Lee – Wiggle her nostrils
- Elton (Winner) – Imitation of Stefan Raab during aerobatics

== 2008 ==
=== Favourite Music Group ===
- US5 (Winners)
- Revolverheld
- Monrose
- Tokio Hotel
- Culcha Candela

=== Favourite Singer ===
- LaFee
- Thomas Godoj (Winner)
- Sarah Connor
- Jimi Blue Ochsenknecht
- Stefanie Heinzmann

=== Favourite Movie ===
Laudator was Miranda Cosgrove.

- Kung Fu Panda
- The Wild Soccer Bunch 5
- Horton Hears a Who!
- Freche Mädchen (Winner)
- Asterix at the Olympic Games

=== Favourite Athlete ===
- Michael Ballack
- Dirk Nowitzki
- Magdalena Neuner
- Fabian Hambüchen
- Bastian Schweinsteiger (Winner)

=== Favourite TV Show ===
Laudators were Lexington Bridge.

- Avatar: The Last Airbender
- Hannah Montana
- Pokémon
- Gute Zeiten, schlechte Zeiten
- iCarly (Winner)

The prize was accepted by Miranda Cosgrove.

=== Favourite Actor/Actress ===
- Jimi Blue Ochsenknecht (Winner)
- Miranda Cosgrove
- Michael "Bully" Herbig
- Josephine Schmidt
- Drake Bell
