= MTV2 Pop =

Defunct German television station

Programming
- Picture format: 576i (4:3 SDTV)

Ownership
- Owner: Viacom International Media Networks

History
- Launched: 1 May 2001; 24 years ago
- Replaced: VH-1 Germany
- Closed: 11 September 2005; 20 years ago
- Replaced by: Nickelodeon Germany

MTV2 Pop was a German music channel. It launched on 1 May 2001, taking over the transponder left by the analogue service of MTV UK and Ireland when it closed down. It replaced VH-1 Germany. The channel mainly focused on Europop and eurodance music (uplifting house/uplifting trance, vocal trance, pumping house, progressive trance).

It closed on 11 September 2005, being replaced by Nickelodeon Germany. MTV2 Pop also broadcast anime such as InuYasha, Lupin III, Golden Boy, Cowboy Bebop and The Vision of Escaflowne.

When the UK version of TMF was hastily launched in October 2002, the channel used MTV2 Pop's presentation graphics, with the identifications re-badged to contain the TMF logo. These graphics were used until Summer 2005.

== History ==
Since 1 May 2001, the channel has been broadcasting Europe-wide via satellite, in the German-language cable networks, partly terrestrial analogue and later also occasionally via DVB-T. It replaced the previously hardly successful VH-1 Germany music channel. The video One More Time by Daft Punk was played both at the start and the end of broadcasting.

=== Programmes ===
At the start of the programme there were clearly separated programmes in themselves, but their music formats did not differ in most cases. Hits of the Century was advertised as a retrospective of the past twenty years, but the same current mainstream clips were broadcast as in the rest of the day and evening program. Only formats such as Dance Hits and later Black Hits differed significantly in their formats from the rest of the programmes. Otherwise, the music videos were selected according to the time of day. So in the mornings not too penetrating, but also not very quiet videos were played (Daylight, Pophits). During the day there were stronger songs in the program (Quicklunch), the evening was aimed at those who were looking for some relaxation (Relax, Kiss Me). The night and weekend program was not arranged according to these aspects (Moonlight, Weekend).

==== Moderated formats ====
The first moderated format was created in August 2001: ODC 40 with Simone Heppner was a two-hour dance chart show. The top 40 charts were based on the NewYorker Official Dance Charts, which were also displayed in the clothing company's branches. In September 2002, the show was renamed New Yorker ODC 40. Several ODC 40 parties were held throughout Germany. At the end of 2004, New Yorker and MTV2 Pop ended the cooperation. Until then, the corresponding music format even dominated the entire program.

The telephone quiz GaMe TV started in July 2003. The moderations were recorded in advance; in contrast to other call-in formats, the participant had to answer several questions about pop culture after registration in five rounds. GaMe TV was discontinued after a short time.

==== Further broadcasts ====
In 2001, the MTV Video Music Awards were repeated on MTV2 Pop. In 2002, older episodes of Making the Band, from which the formation O-Town emerged, were broadcast, while MTV Germany showed more recent episodes.

==== Anime and cartoon series ====
Between September 2003 and January 2004, the station broadcast anime and cartoon series formerly broadcast on MTV Germany and Nickelodeon Germany.

- Radiated cartoon series:
  - Aaahh!!! Real Monsters (Aaahh!!! Monsters)
  - The Ren & Stimpy Show

Originally other cartoons like CatDog had been announced as well. It is unclear why they had limited themselves to the series mentioned above.

- Broadcast anime series:
  - Inuyasha (episodes 1-52, uncut)
  - Lupin the Third
  - Cowboy Bebop
  - The Vision of Escaflowne
  - Golden Boy

MTV2 Pop broadcast the anime series Inuyasha as German premiere and in an uncut version (the repeat and the second German season aired on RTL II in a cut version).

=== On-air design ===
In its first month, MTV2 Pop revised its on-air design twice. This was because the agency Regardez! was only commissioned with the design at short notice and the final version of the Lots of Dots baptized on-air design could not be completed on time. In addition, there were problems with the MTV servers in London, which could only display the animated insertions incorrectly. Therefore, a provisional on-air package was developed for the initial phase.

With Lots of Dots, a graphic world with light bulb surfaces and 3D elements, the disco and nightlife theme was taken up. The graphics were from 06:00 to 12:00 in yellow, from 12:00 to 18:00 in orange, from 18:00 to 24:00 in magenta (a special feature is that in the trailers no self-producing music, but "One More Time" was incorporated) and from 00:00 to 06:00 in blue.

On 30 September 2002, MTV2 Pop presented itself in a new design. The design package, created by the station's own on-air promotion, represented a playful, flat flora and fauna landscape. The colours were retained as the transmission surface separators. Shortly afterwards, the design was taken over by the then newly founded British branch of the TMF pop channel.

The station's signature tune is based on Weave Your Web by Luke Slater.

=== Channel name ===
Some confusion was also caused by the station name. As it can be seen from the first design drafts, MTV Pop was originally intended as the name. Obviously the final logo with the internationally established brand MTV2 fit better to the general appearance, so that at first it was called MTV2 The Pop Channel or simply MTV2. With the first revision in mid-May 2001, the short form MTV2 Pop, which is more distinguishable from other MTV2 programs, gradually gained acceptance. A few months later, MTV Pop was suddenly mentioned in the program notes and moderations. Only shortly before the end of broadcasting MTV2 Pop was mentioned again almost everywhere on the website. The logo remained the same throughout.

== Audience ==
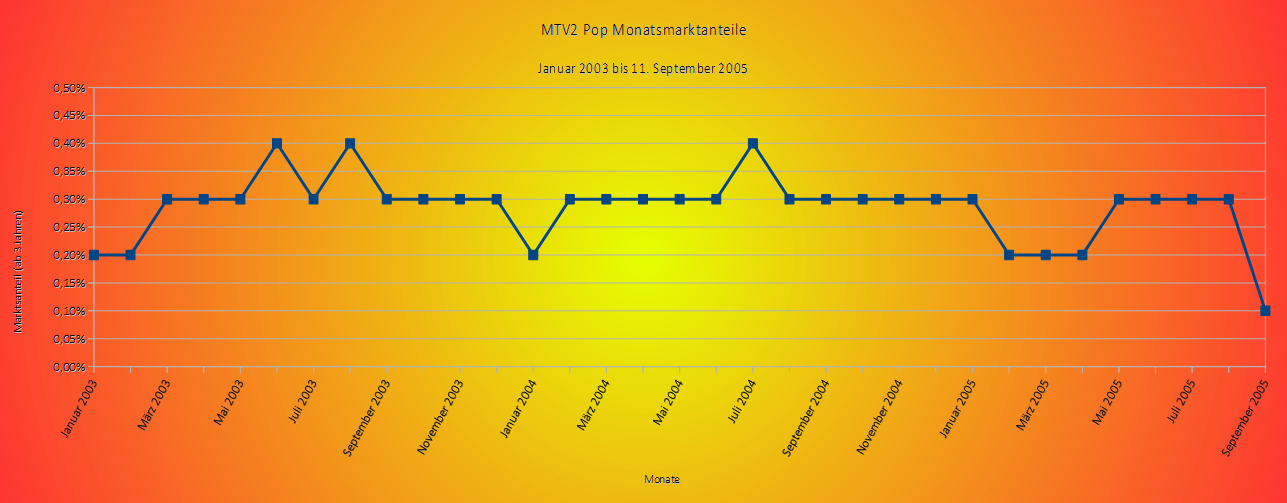
Marketshare of MTV2 Pop (January 2003 – September 2005)

MTV2 Pop first reported quotas in 2003 and did so, as did its main channel MTV Germany, from January 2003 onwards. Market shares were reported for each month until the discontinuation in September 2005, but the discontinuation did not result in an annual market share for 2005, unlike 2003 and 2004.

In both 2003 and 2004, MTV2 Pop reached 0.3% of the total audience, 0.2% and 0.1% respectively below MTV Germany and 0.1% below VIVA Germany, against which MTV2 Pop was directly positioned.

From January 2003 to 11 September 2005, there were repeated fluctuations in market share. For example, a market share of 0.4% was achieved several times, while the lowest market share of 0.1% was achieved in September 2005. This is due to the fact that MTV2 Pop ceased broadcasting on 11 September 2005, which means that September 2005 as a whole cannot be taken into account.

== Sampler ==
On 30 September 2002 (volume 1) and 14 April 2003 (volume 2), two CD compilations were released in cooperation with Polystar under the name MTV(2) Pop - Tophits Nonstop!. One CD consisted mainly of dance tracks, the much more poppy content of the second CD could be determined by internet users by voting.

== Discontinuation ==
Since Viacom became the market leader in music television in Germany in 2004 through the acquisition of VIVA Germany and VIVA Plus, all special formats on MTV2 Pop were cancelled. The reason given for this step was that the four programs were now to be made more widely available with differentiable formats. As a family-friendly program, MTV2 Pop occasionally recorded older videos in the program until it was discontinued. On 11 September 2005, MTV2 Pop was replaced by the children's channel Nickelodeon Germany, which started broadcasting after a 24-hour countdown.
