= Viva Zwei =

VIVA Zwei
- Last VIVA Zwei logo

History
- Launched: 21 March 1995
- Closed: 7 January 2002

Viva Zwei was a German music channel aired and distributed throughout Europe. The channel was launched on 21 March 1995 under the name "Viva II" as a second channel to the main channel VIVA in Germany and lasted until 7 January 2002, when it got replaced by Viva Plus.

Unlike VIVA, Viva Zwei focused on more alternative styles of music, especially indie and alternative rock, metal, alternative hip hop and electronic music. It was also devoted to music from lesser known bands that could use Viva Zwei to get their music heard and was aimed at a more adult and more sophisticated audience while other music channels such as VIVA and MTV were aimed towards a mainstream audience that mainly consisted of teenagers and young adults. Even though it was not well-known to the music world, Viva Zwei was considered an important music channel for alternative styles of music and an example of a music channel dedicated to less mainstream music and aimed at a less mainstream audience. However, it never managed to become a financial success and piled up losses that led to its discontinuation. The main channel VIVA was discontinued at the end of 2018.

== History ==
=== 1995–1996: The beginning ===
One of the first shows on Viva Zwei was Geschmackssache, a German TV show that featured singers from around the world. The singer would talk about himself or herself and would show some of their favorite music videos to the viewers. Viva Zwei's logo at the time was a logo in a transverse wave form similar to the VIVA logo with a Roman numeral 2 (II) sign beside it, and it was put into the upper right corner of the screen. In mid 1996, the logo was changed to a logo similar of a plus sign with the uppercase word "ZWEI" beside it, and it was put into the lower left corner of the screen.

The 1995–1996 original Viva Zwei channel (more known as Viva II at the time) aired mostly classic 60s, 70s and 80s music as well as current 90s pop music and shows like Das War... (translated into the English language: That Was..., for example: Das War 1964 (That Was 1964), Das War 1974 (That Was 1974), Das War 1984 (That Was 1984), Das War 1994 (That Was 1994) etc.) and Geschmackssache. At this time, VIVA was the mainstream channel for shows.

=== 1997–2001: Change in concept ===
In 1997, more programming started to be aired such as 2Rock, 2Step, Fast Forward, Trendspotting, Wah^{2} and Zwobot. The channel now focused more on current, alternative styles of music, mainly alternative and indie rock, but also metal, alternative hip hop and electronic music, and started becoming a place for lesser known bands that were not aired on MTV or VIVA to get their music heard, as well as airing music from bigger name stars such as Depeche Mode.

=== 2001–2002: Closure ===
By 2001, the channel became more popular, but its owner, Time Warner, was losing money; Viva Zwei was generating losses and was not popular enough to survive. In mid-summer 2001, it was announced that Viva Zwei would be shut down.

The shutdown occurred on 7 January 2002. The final video on the network was a sendoff video, a special thanks to Viva Zwei's hosts, a music video from Zwobot, and Mr. Explosion from Zwobot. Then, Viva Zwei switched full time into Viva Plus, a channel dedicated to mainstream pop music. This was considered to be a loss to the music world by fans of the old channel as well as music personalities, because it eliminated a medium for lesser known bands to be recognized.

Some shows lived on on Viva Plus or VIVA though: Fast Forward, a German music talk show hosted by Charlotte Roche, aired on Viva Zwei from 1999 to 2001, moved to VIVA in 2002 and lasted there until 2 January 2005. On 2 January, the farewell episode of Fast Forward aired without Charlotte Roche. It aired only music videos, and at the end broadcast a message saying "Fast Forward Say Thank You" and ended showing its usual closing sequence.

Overdrive ran on Viva Zwei from 1998 to 2002, came back on Viva Plus later in 2002 and lasted there until 2007, when Viva Plus shut down. 2Step and E-Beats were slated to have come back on Viva Plus, but the idea was canceled when it was decided that Viva Plus would only broadcast Get the Clip.

On 14 January 2007, Viva Plus itself was discontinued and replaced by Comedy Central.

== Logo history ==
1995–1996	1996–2002

== Shows ==
- 2Dark
- 2New
- 2Rock
- 2Rock Charts
- 2Step
- 90's Backspin
- A. M.
- Airplay Charts
- Best of Fast Forward
- Best of Haushaltshilfe
- Best of Soja
- Blue
- Connex
- Das War...
- Deep
- Downtown
- D-Tonal
- Electronic Beats
- F. M.
- Fast Forward
- Geschmackssache
- Haushalts Hilfe
- H.
- Jam
- Kaffeeklatsch
- Kamikaze
- LP Charts
- Massiv
- Metalla
- Minh-Khai & Friends
- Moon
- Move
- Mr.Explosion
- Neuigkeiten
- Noon
- Overdrive
- P. M.
- Pop
- Popp TV
- PVG
- Red
- Shockwave
- Sleepless
- Sneak Preview
- Soja
- Sunny Side Up
- Supreme
- The Flow
- Trendspotting
- Twelve
- UK Charts
- UK/US Charts
- US Charts
- Vinyl
- Vinyl-X-Tra
- Virus
- Wah^{2}
- Zelluloid
- Zone 2
- Zwei Clips
- Zwobot

== Hosts ==
- Götz Bühler
- Rocco Clein
- Dirk Dresselhaus (alias Schneider TM)
- Katja Giglinger
- Simon Gosejohann
- Markus Kavka
- Ill-Young Kim
- Tanja Mairhofer
- Markus Meske
- Nils Neumann
- Minh-Khai Phan-Thi
- Charlotte Roche
- Niels Ruf
- Falk "Hawkeye" Schacht
- Patrick Sommer
- Herbert
- Zwobot
