= Comedy Central (Germany) =

German television station

- Country: Germany
- Broadcast area: Germany; Austria; Switzerland
- Network: Comedy Central
- Headquarters: Berlin, Germany

Programming
- Picture format: 1080i HDTV (downscaled to 16:9 576i for the standard-definition feed)
- Timeshift service: Comedy Central +1 (Germany and Austria, timeshare with Nickelodeon)

Ownership
- Owner: Paramount Networks EMEAA

History
- Launched: 15 January 2007
- Replaced: VIVA Plus; VIVA Germany

Links
- Website: http://www.comedycentral.tv/

Comedy Central is a German free-to-air channel owned by Paramount Networks EMEAA. It is distributed in Germany, Austria, and Switzerland and broadcasts many American and British imported television series as well as original programming. It launched on 15 January 2007 replacing former music channel VIVA Plus. Prior to its launch, Viacom had Nick Comedy, which was a timeshared channel with Nickelodeon Germany, airing from 9:15pm to 6:00am. Since 2021, the 1-hour timeshift Comedy Central +1 timeshares from 8:15pm to 1:00am with Nickelodeon in Germany and Austria.

From 15 December 2008 until 31 December 2018 Comedy Central Germany ceased broadcasting 24 hours a day and used to timeshare its slot with Nickelodeon Germany first then later VIVA Germany, running from 8:15pm to 5:45am. However, after VIVA ceased on 31 December 2018 at 14:00 Comedy Central returned to broadcast 24 hours a day, and next day logo was changed.

== History ==
Comedy Central Germany was licensed by the Media Authority of North Rhine-Westphalia (LfM), which is also the supervising State media authority for the channel. On 24 November 2006, the license of VIVA Plus was changed to Comedy Central. Due to this, it got a license valid until 20 March 2010.

Viacom initially tried to establish the channel independently as a 24-hour network. On 15 December 2008, however, Comedy Central started to timeshare its frequency with Nickelodeon and therefore reduced its broadcast time to 9:30 hours, from 8:15pm until 5:45am. Viacom previously launched a comedy timeshared channel using that same timeslot named Nick Comedy, which lasted from 2005 to 2006. It was shut down in favour of Comedy Central Germany.

On 1 March 2010, Comedy Central Germany switched its aspect ratio to 16:9 and began airing its programming schedule in widescreen.

On 1 October 2011, Comedy Central Germany was rebranded, using the American new logo and graphic packages.

From 1 October 2014, Comedy Central Germany shared air-time with VIVA Germany, due to launch of NickNight, late night block equivalent to American Nick@Nite until 31 December 2018 when VIVA ceased with Comedy Central finally broadcasting 24/7.

On 1 March 2021, MTV+ was replaced by Comedy Central +1. Its time-slot is composed of animated shows.

In 2023 an English language audio feed was added with the original language available on almost all shows (except Rick and Morty). The audio feed sometimes broadcasts trailers in English.

=== Austrian subfeed ===
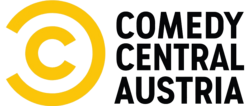
Logo of Comedy Central Austria

An Austrian subfeed of the channel was launched on 1 January 2011. The programming is the same as the German main feed with the exception of airing local advertisements. It replaced VIVA Austria's timeslot on Nickelodeon Austria as a timeshared channel, following the shut down of MTV Austria. Due to VIVA closing, Comedy Central became a 24-hour channel.

On 1 October 2021, Comedy Central +1 replaced Nicknight in Austria.

=== Swiss subfeed ===
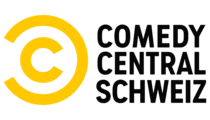
Logo of Comedy Central Schweiz

In Switzerland, a localised subfeed was launched on 16 May 2011. The Swiss subfeed differs from the main feed on having less on-air time, ending its broadcast at 5:00am in favour of Nickelodeon Switzerland. Like in Austria, Comedy Central replaced VIVA Switzerland, which had its programming moved to MTV Switzerland in the following months. Nevertheless, Viacom announced on 28 September 2012 that VIVA Switzerland would be launched again on 1 October as a full, 24-hour channel. Due to VIVA closing, Comedy Central became a 24-hour channel.

On 12 January 2022, Comedy Central Schweiz stopped broadcasting and was replaced by the German feed.

== High-definition feed ==
Logo of Comedy Central HD

On 16 May 2011, Viacom launched Comedy Central HD, which was picked up by Telekom and Vodafone TV. Later, on 11 June 2011, HD+ by Astra starts offering the channel on its satellite line up.

== Audience share ==
=== Germany ===
	January	February	March	April	May	June	July	August	September	October	November	December	Annual average
2007	0,1	0,2	0,3	0,3	0,2	0,3	0,3	0,3	0,3	0,3	0,3	0,3	0,3
2008	0,3	0,3	0,3	0,3	0,3	0,3	0,4	0,3	0,3	0,3	0,4	0,4	▲0,3
2009	0,2	0,2	0,3	0,3	0,3	0,3	0,4	0,3	0,3	0,3	0,3	0,3	▼0,3
2010	0,3	0,3	0,3	0,3	0,3	0,3	0,3	0,4	0,3	0,3	0,3	0,3	▲0,3
2011	0,3	0,4	0,4	0,4	0,4	0,4	0,5	0,5	0,4	0,4	0,3	0,3	▲0,4
2012	0,3	0,3	0,3	0,3	0,4	0,3	0,3	0,4	0,4	0,4	0,4	0,4	▼0,3
2013	0,3	0,3	0,3	0,3	0,4	0,4	0,4	0,4	0,3	0,3	0,3	0,3	▼0,3
2014	0,3	0,3	0,4	0,4	0,4	0,3	0,3	0,4	0,2	0,4	0,4	0,4	▲0,3
2015	0,3	0,4	0,4	0,4	0,4	0,4	0,4	0,4	0,4	0,3	0,3	0,4	▲0,4
2016	0,3	0,3	0,4	0,4	0,4	0,4	0,4	0,3	0,3	0,3	0,3	0,3	▼0,3
2017	0,3	0,3	0,4	0,4	0,4	0,4	0,4	0,4	0,5	0,4			▲0,4
