= Palina Rojinski =

Russian-German television presenter

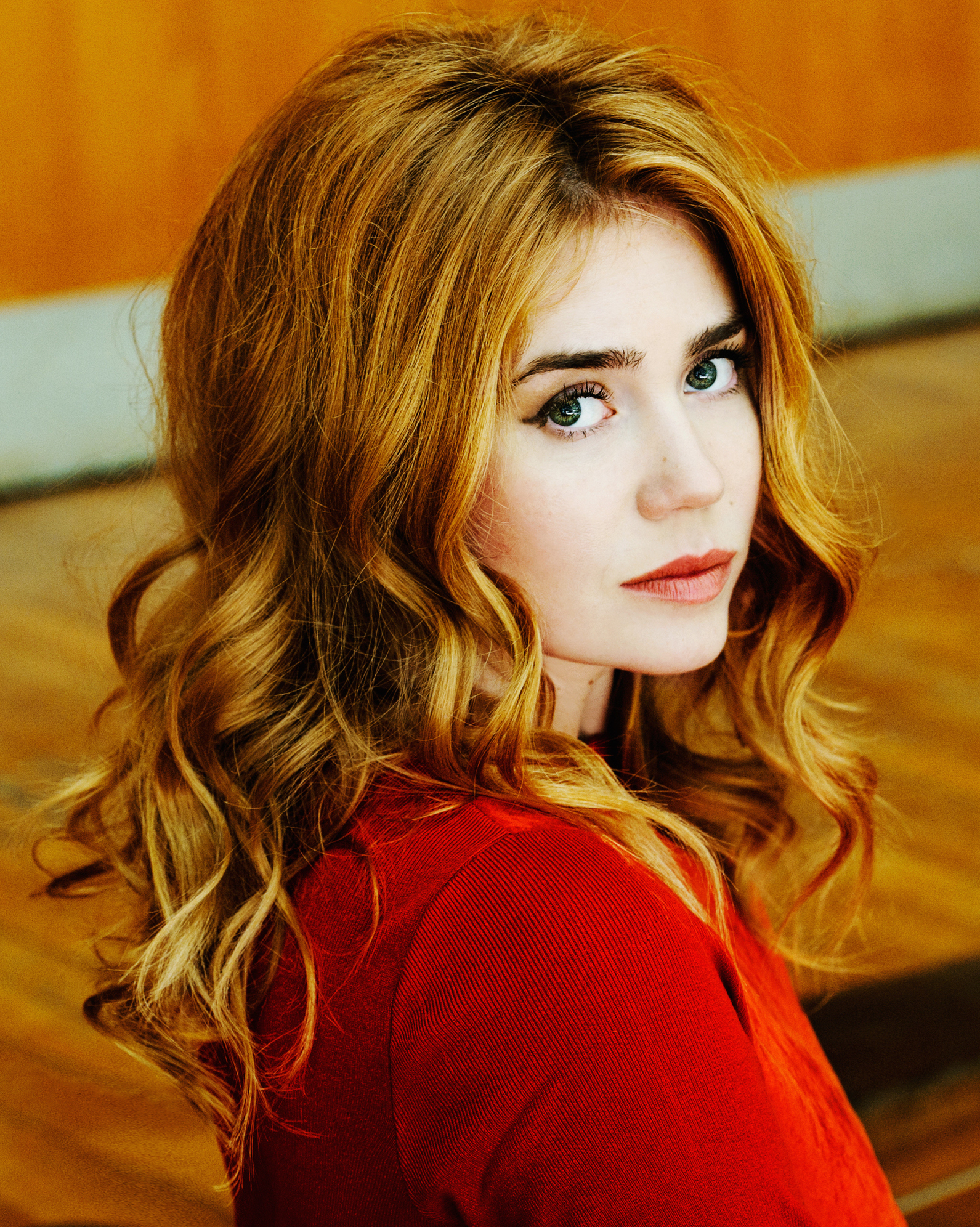
- Rojinski in 2016
- Born: Palina Rozhinskaya; 21 April 1985 (age 41); Leningrad, Soviet Union
- Occupations: TV presenter, actress
- Years active: 2009-present

Palina Rojinski (née Rozhinskaya, Russian: Полина Игоревна Рожинская; born 21 April 1985) is a Russian-German television presenter and actress based in Germany.

== Life and career ==
From 2009 to 2011, she hosted MTV Home on MTV Germany, and since 2011 has hosted various music-programs on VIVA Germany. As of 2012, she models for Otto GmbH and Adidas. Since 2013, she has worked exclusively for TV-channel ProSieben. Since 2014, she plays in the German comedy-show "Was wäre wenn?".

Her father is Jewish, her mother is Christian.

She has publicly spoken out against the Russian invasion of Ukraine.

== Filmography ==
=== As host ===
- 2010-2011: MTV Home
- 2011-2013: neoParadise
- 2011-2015: VIVA Top 100
- 2012: Zirkus Rojinski
- 2013-2017: Circus HalliGalli
- 2013-2015: Got to dance (as judge)
- 2014: Crazy Dates
- 2014-2017: Offline - Palina World Wide Weg

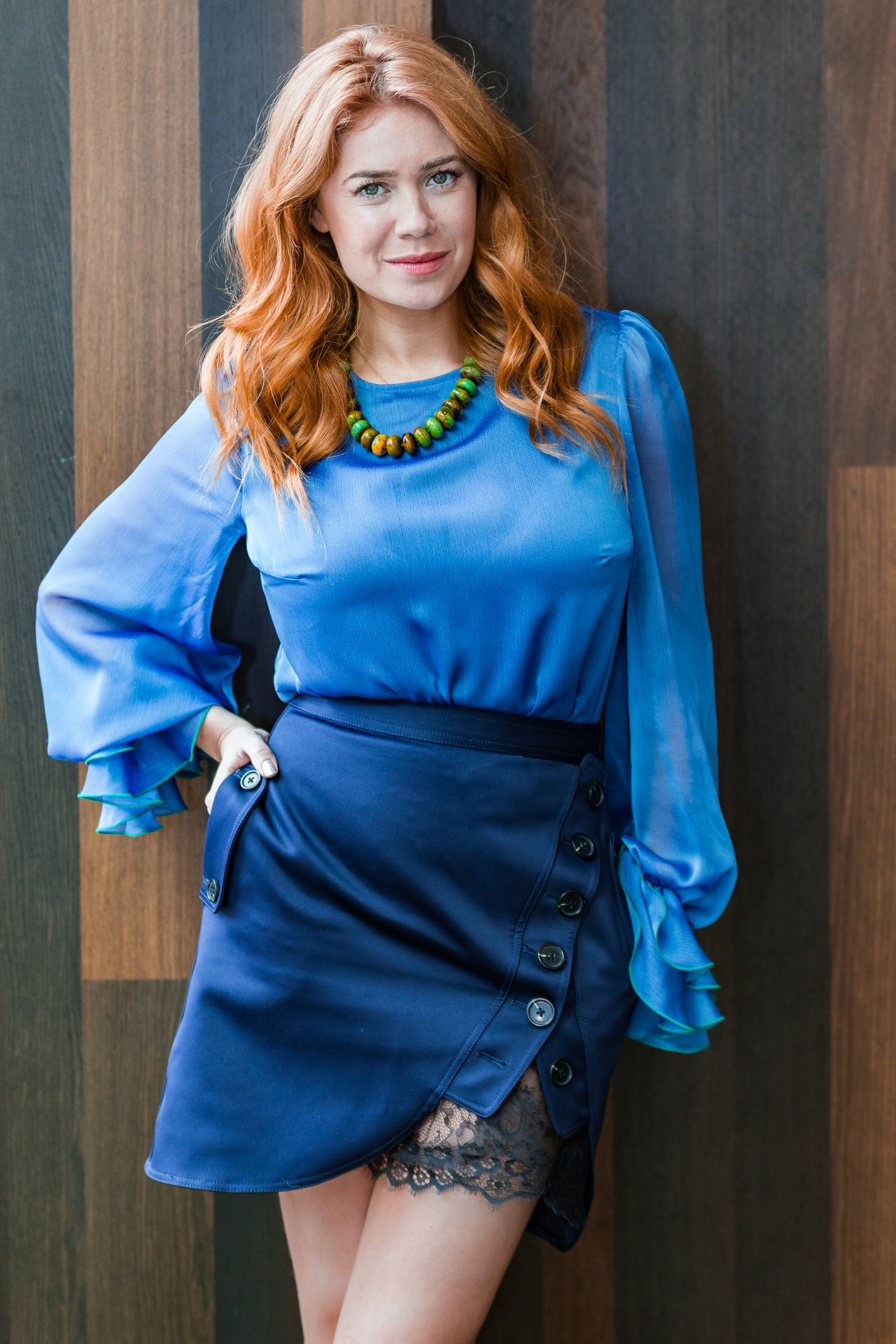
Rojinski in 2018

- 2014: Was wäre wenn?
- 2015: The big Surprise - Dein schönster Albtraum
- 2016: Das ProSieben Auswärtsspiel
- 2018: Unser Russland - Eine Städtereise zur Fußball-WM
- 2019: Yo! MTV Raps
- 2020: Sing on! Germany
- 2022: Gipfel der Quizgiganten

=== As actress ===
- 2009: Männerherzen ... Sabrina Silver
- 2011: Men in the City 2 ... cameo
- 2011: Woman in Love ... Jasmina
- 2011: Hotel Desire (short) ... Julia
- 2012: Jesus loves me ... Svetlana
- 2012: Zeit der Helden ... Katharina Ulrich
- 2013: Weniger ist mehr ... Katja Müller
- 2013: Tatort: Die fette Hoppe ... Nadine Reuter
- 2015: Traumfrauen ... Vivienne
- 2016: Welcome to Germany as Sofie Hartmann
- 2016: Ich du & sie
- 2018: jerks. (season 2, episode 5 Tibet)
- 2018: Early Man (Goona, Stimme)
- 2019: Get lucky
- 2020: Nightlife
- 2020: Granny Nanny
- 2026: My Ex
