= Sarah Kuttner – Die Show =

German television talk show

Sarah Kuttner – Die Show is a German television talk show that ran on VIVA and was then transferred to MTV under the title "Kuttner." in mid-2005. It ran from 2 August 2004 to 3 August 2006.

Hosted by Sarah Kuttner, it was a more youthful variation on the traditional late show concept with a sidekick, Sven Schuhmacher, and various national as well as international celebrity guests. The show also featured humorous reports by Michael Wigge and Caroline Korneli, its own band and musical guests performing live on stage.

When MTV took over other German music channel VIVA in 2004, it was suggested, the show would be cancelled, which drew massive protests from fans. It was then cut from four shows per week to just two shows and later transferred to MTV and renamed Kuttner. Production was relocated from Cologne to Berlin.

MTV cancelled Kuttner. in summer 2006 due to low ratings and high production costs.
