= VIVA Switzerland =

VIVA Schweiz
- Country: Switzerland
- Broadcast area: Switzerland
- Headquarters: Berlin, Germany

Programming
- Language(s): German
- Picture format: 576i (16:9 SDTV); 1080i (HDTV)

Ownership
- Owner: Viacom International Media Networks Europe
- Sister channels: MTV; MTV Brand New; Comedy Central; Nickelodeon; Nicktoons; Nick Jr.

History
- Launched: 6 September 1999; 25 years ago
- Closed: 31 December 2018; 6 years ago
- Former names: SWIZZ (1999–2000); VIVA Swizz (2000–2002)

Links
- Website: VIVA Switzerland

VIVA Schweiz was a TV channel which timeshared with Nickelodeon Switzerland and featured music videos and quizzes. It launched on 6 September 1999 as SWIZZ. The channel served German-speaking regions in Switzerland. It closed on 31 December 2018, along with all other Viva-branded channels.

== Timesharing with Comedy Central ==
From 8 September 2014 VIVA aired between 6am and 5pm, with Comedy Central Switzerland taking up evening and late night. Until October 2014 there was a simulcast broadcast of the program of Comedy Central on the shared frequency with Nickelodeon (9 pm to 5.30 am) and on the VIVA-frequency (5 pm to 6 am).

Programmes:

- Charts Rotation
- Clip Trip
- Nacht Express
- VIVA News

== Presenters ==
Among the presenters was Noémi Besedes.
