= Nickelodeon (German TV channel) =

German children's television channel

- Logo used since 1 August 2023 (Note: The logo's wordmark has been in use since 31 March 2010. Additionally, there is a variant meant to be used for white backgrounds; the main variant has a white wordmark in conjunction with a fully orange splat.)
- Country: Germany
- Broadcast area: Germany; Austria; Liechtenstein; Luxembourg; Switzerland
- Network: Skydance Corporation
- Headquarters: Düsseldorf, Germany (1995–1998); Berlin, Germany (2005–present)

Programming
- Languages: German; English
- Picture format: 1080i HDTV (downscaled to 16:9 576i for the SDTV feed)

Ownership
- Owner: Paramount Networks EMEAA (Skydance Corporation)
- Parent: Nickelodeon Group
- Sister channels: Nicktoons; Nick Jr.

History
- Launched: 5 July 1995 (original); 12 September 2005 (relaunch)
- Replaced: MTV2 Pop (second iteration)
- Closed: 31 May 1998 (original)
- Former names: Nickelodeon (original use; 1995–1998); Nick (2005–2010); Nickelodeon (second use, 2010–2017); Nick (second use, 2017–2023)

Links
- Website: Official website

Availability (channel space shared with nighttime programming block Comedy Central +1)

Nickelodeon is a German free-to-air television channel for children, part of the international. based on the U.S. counterpart brand originally launched in 1995, relaunched in 2005 as Nick, Nickelodeon is based in Berlin. The channel is available on subscription services and as an unscrambled, free-to-air (FTA) satellite signal. On 31 March 2010, the channel readopted the name Nickelodeon on air and online after being shortened to Nick since its relaunch in 2005, in addition to the new Nickelodeon logo and graphical package being rolled out internationally at the time. In 2017, The Nickelodeon name was shortened again to Nick before being reversed and readopted once again when it rebranded on 1 August 2023, nearly five months after its rebrand in the U.S. Since then, the channel is also broadcast in English in addition to German on a secondary audio track. It is aimed at children between the ages of 6 and 13.

== Nicknight ==
Nicknight was a German, Austrian and Swiss programming block operating from 2014 to 2021. On 1 November 2018, Nicknight Germany was replaced by MTV+ (Comedy Central +1 since 1 March 2021). Nicknight closed in Switzerland and Austria on 1 October 2021, and were replaced by Comedy Central Austria and 7+ Family respectively.

== History ==
=== 1995–1998 ===
The original version of Nickelodeon was launched on 5 July 1995 on the DFS Kopernikus satellite and a few cable providers in North Rhine-Westphalia. The station was launched in a joint venture between Viacom, who owned 90%, and Ravensburger's film and television division, who owned the remaining 10%. Nickelodeon initially aired for six hours per day from 1:00 pm to 7:00 pm on weekdays and 8:00 am to 1:00pm on weekends; during off-air hours, the channel looped a half-hour special featuring excerpts from its shows. The station was headquartered in Düsseldorf where live presentation came from. Starting in October 1995, Nickelodeon aired from 6:00 am until 8:00 pm, and timeshared with Arte starting in 1996, truncating its broadcast to 5:00 pm, though later expanded to 7:00 pm.

After Der Kinderkanal launched in January 1997, Nickelodeon's channel slot replaced by Kinderkanal on many cable providers and started timesharing with VH-1 Germany on satellite between 6:00am and 8:00pm. Nickelodeon was a financial failure and lost 150,000,000 Deutsche Mark due to weak advertising sales and its inability to compete against the more successful Kinderkanal. The channel's future had been deliberated since the beginning of 1998 and its closure had been planned months in advance. Viacom announced it with only days of notice given to employees. During the station's final three days, a testcard aired after each programme informing viewers of its incoming closure.

During the final three days, the final episode of Nick Live Club aired, in which the channel's in-vision presenters thanked viewers for watching before performing a farewell song. This episode was filmed on 29 May and was repeated up to and including the final day. The channel closed on 31 May 1998 at 8:00 pm with a video thanking viewers and informing them Nickelodeon's programming would soon be available elsewhere, before switching to VH1. Its transponder space was occupied with an edited version of the testcard in the following weeks, before MTV was relocated to the transponder the following year.

Viacom soon thereafter struck a deal with RTL owner CLT-UFA to broadcast their programming on RTL's own children's channel, Super RTL, in addition to a weekend morning Nicktoons block on the main RTL channel. After VH-1 Germany shut down in 2001 (and was replaced by a pan-European feed on a separate channel), it was replaced with MTV2 Pop.

=== Relaunch: 2005–2010 ===
On 7 April 2005, it was announced that Nickelodeon Germany would be relaunched under the name Nick as a new channel on 12 September 2005. Nick started with a prime-time programming block titled Nick Comedy that aired sitcoms and other comedy shows. Nickelodeon eventually replaced MTV2 Pop; since February 2006, in addition to international series, it started airing locally produced shows. In October 2007, a special German version of the Kids' Choice Awards was produced and broadcast on the channel.

In the start of 2008, Nick launched a family-oriented programming block named Nick nach acht (Nick after eight), which was the local adaptation of US overnight block Nick at Nite. It aired documentaries, drama series, films and sitcoms. It used an adapted logo of its US counterpart. Most of the block's programming schedule consisted on repeats of The Ren & Stimpy Show and CatDog. On 15 December 2008, Comedy Central Germany replaced Nick nach acht on Nickelodeon, taking over its airing time as a timeshared channel starting 8:15 pm.

=== 2010s ===
On 31 March 2010, the channel adopted the new international branding. The full Nickelodeon name was restored, while Nick Premium was rebranded as Nicktoons.

On 1 June 2011, Nickelodeon Germany started broadcasting in HD.

On 1 October 2014, Nickelodeon Germany became a 24-hour channel, with Comedy Central leaving Nickelodeon's channel slot and moving to VIVA Germany. Furthermore, Nickelodeon introduced a new overnight programming block called Nicknight, replacing Comedy Central's airing time from 9:00 pm to 5:45 am.

On 28 June 2017, the channel rebranded and shortened its name back to Nick.

On 1 November 2018 at 5 am, Nicknight was discontinued. At 8.15 pm on that day MTV+ launched airing from 8:15 pm to 5 am. However, the Austrian and Swiss feeds continued carrying the Nicknight brand until 1 October 2021, when they were replaced by Comedy Central Austria and 7+ Family.

=== 2020s ===
On 1 March 2021, MTV+ was replaced by Comedy Central +1.

On 1 August 2023, Nickelodeon Germany rebranded on the same date as other international feeds and reverted to the original "Nickelodeon" name.

On 23 April 2024, it was reported that RTL Group (the former CLT-UFA) had reached an agreement with Paramount Global to acquire Nickelodeon Germany, as Paramount wants to refocus its resources on Paramount+ and Pluto TV. If the deal were to have been approved, RTL Group would rebrand the channel as Toggo, the same name used for Super RTL's programming block for children, while also having the broadcasting rights for Nickelodeon shows on German television. On 17 September 2024, it was announced by the German Federal Cartel Office (FCO) that they had blocked RTL's purchase of Nickelodeon Germany.

== Other feeds ==
=== Austrian channel ===
Logo of Nickelodeon Austria

On 1 June 2006, an Austrian subfeed of the channel was launched, initially timesharing with VIVA Austria from 6.00 am to 7.00 pm. On 1 January 2011, it started timesharing with Comedy Central Austria. The channel is known on-air as Nickelodeon Austria.

On 1 October 2014, Nick Austria started broadcasting 24 hours a day with the launch of NickNight.

On 1 October 2021, the channel started timesharing with Comedy Central Austria, along with a new licence from RRtv, using the European graphics package, its schedule and its original name, Nickelodeon. Nick Austria rebranded into the 2023 Splat and was fully reverted back to its original name "Nickelodeon".

At the end of June 2025, Nickelodeon Austria stopped broadcasting and was replaced by the German feed.

=== Swiss channel ===
Logo of Nickelodeon Schweiz

A Swiss subfeed for German-speaking viewers was launched on 1 April 2009, first timesharing with VIVA Switzerland and then with Comedy Central starting on 16 May 2011. For many years, its programming schedule was identical with the main, German feed. Nevertheless, it got its own, separate schedule. The channel is known on-air as Nickelodeon Schweiz.

On 1 October 2014, Nick Switzerland started broadcasting 24 hours a day with the launch of NickNight.

Since 1 October 2021, the channel has been run by CH Media under license from Paramount.

On 23 August 2023, Nick Switzerland rebranded into the 2023 Splat and was reverted back to its original name "Nickelodeon".

This is the only remaining Nickelodeon Germany subfeed following the shutdown of the Austrian subfeed.

== Sister channels ==
=== Nicktoons ===
Nicktoons logo

Nicktoons was launched in December 2007 as Nick Premium. In 2009, Nickelodeon announced that Nick Premium would be rebranded as Nicktoons. The channel airs animated programmes from Nickelodeon.

=== Nick Jr. ===
Nick Jr. logo

Nick Jr. is a channel that broadcasts to younger children. The channel was launched on 12 September 2005 as a block and on 31 March 2009 as a channel. Before the channel launched, some programmes were broadcast on Super RTL and Disney Channel.
