= Nick Jr. (Germany) =

Nick Jr. Germany
- Country: Germany
- Broadcast area: Germany; Austria; Switzerland; Liechtenstein; Luxembourg
- Network: Paramount Networks EMEAA
- Headquarters: Berlin, Germany

Programming
- Language: German
- Picture format: 576i (16:9 SDTV); 1080i (HDTV)

Ownership
- Owner: Paramount Networks EMEAA
- Parent: Nickelodeon Group
- Sister channels: Nicktoons; Nickelodeon

History
- Launched: 1996 (first block); September 12, 2005 (second block); March 31, 2009 (channel)
- Closed: May 29, 1998 (first block)

Links
- Website: Nick Jr. Germany (redirects to nick.de)

Nick Jr. is a German TV television channel broadcasting to children in Germany, Switzerland and Austria. The current version of channel was launched on September 12, 2005 as a programming block on the relaunched version of Nickelodeon between 6am and 10am and 4:30am to 9:45am on Nick Premium. The channel now broadcasts 24/7 from March 31, 2009. Before the channel launched, some programs were broadcast on Super RTL and Disney Channel.

On 1 April 2020, Nick Jr. and Nicktoons were added back to Sky Deutschland, replacing Disney Junior.

The channel also had a block on the original version of Nickelodeon Germany which lasted until 29 May 1998 between 9:30am and 11:30am, the German-input block was presented by Face (known in German as Gesicht), although the block was initially titled Zirkus Nickelodeon. On 31 March 2010, the channel rebranded into its current look.

== Nick Jr. von Nickelodeon ==
On 4 February 2019, the Nick Jr. block was removed from Nickelodeon Germany. However, Nick Jr. von Nickelodeon continued to air on Nick Schweiz and Austria until October 2021.

== See also ==
- Nickelodeon
- Super RTL
- MTV
- Nicktoons
- Nickelodeon Schweiz
- Nickelodeon Junior (France)
- Viacom International Media Networks Northern Europe
