= Mola Adebisi =

German television presenter

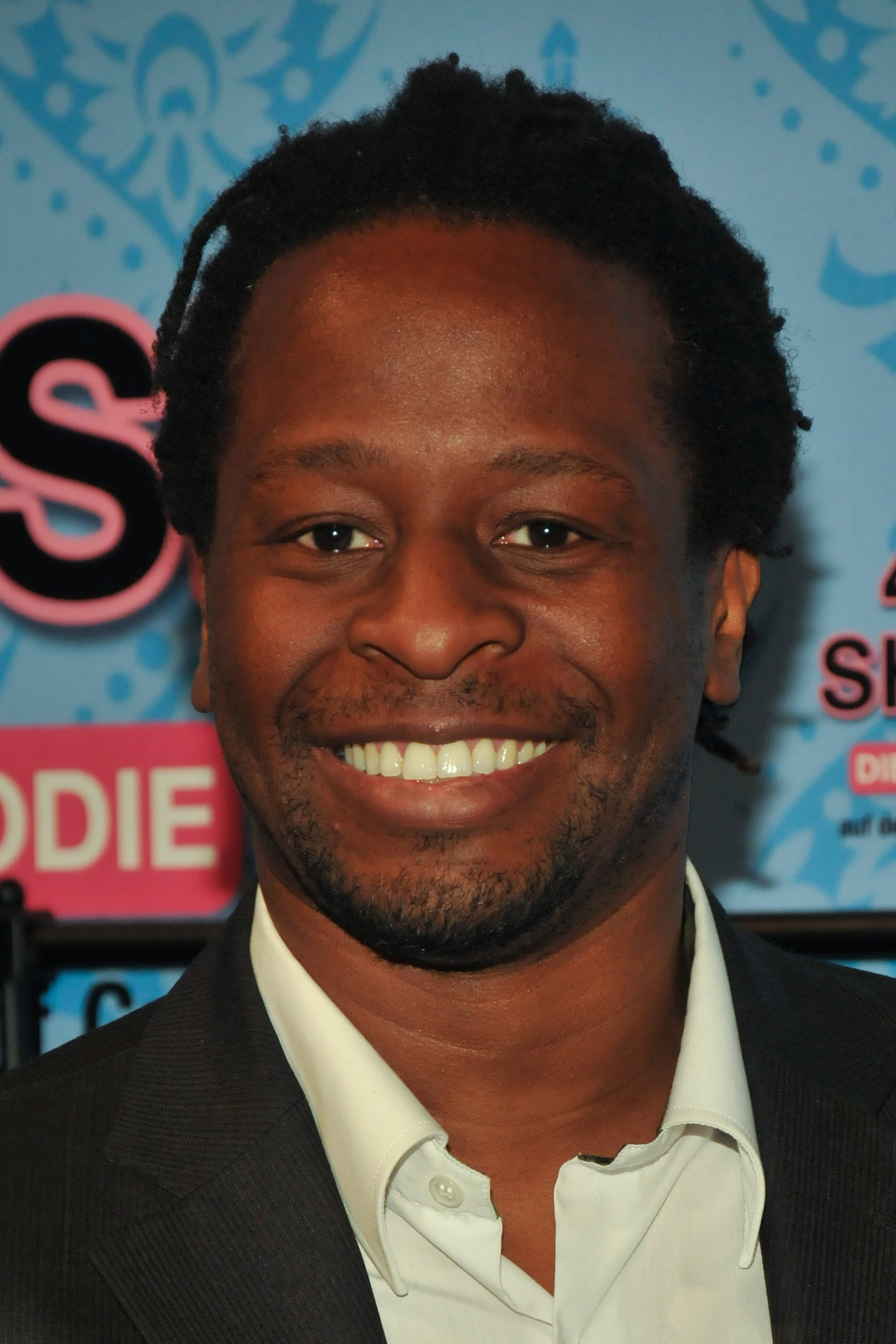
- Adebisi in 2014
- Born: Ademola Oluwatosin Adetumbo Adebisi; 15 February 1973 (age 53); Uelzen, West Germany
- Occupations: Television presenter, television personality
- Years active: 1990s–present

Ademola Oluwatosin Adetumbo Adebisi (born 15 February 1973) is a German television personality and presenter. He has also ventured into acting, singing, dancing and amateur car racing.

Mola Adebis was born in Uelzen to parents from Nigeria and grew up in Solingen. From 1993 to 2004, he was a presenter of a number of shows on the music television channel VIVA Germany.

== Personal life ==
He lives in Solingen and has one kid with his wife Adelina Zilai.

== Filmography ==
=== As actor ===
- 1995: Jede Menge Leben
- 1996: Der Trip – Die nackte Gitarre 0,5
- 1996–1997: Marienhof
- 1997: Einsatz Hamburg Süd
- 1999: alphateam – Die Lebensretter im OP
- 1999: Sieben Tage bis zum Glück
- 2008: Falco: Damn It, We're Still Alive!
- 2011: Alarm für Cobra 11 – Die Autobahnpolizei

=== As dubbing actor ===
- 2002: Ali G in da House
- 2004: Große Haie – Kleine Fische

== Discography ==
- 1996: Shake that Body
- 1997: Get It Right (mit Sqeezer & Bed & Breakfast)
- 1997: Don't Give Up
