= Niels Ruf =

German journalist, actor

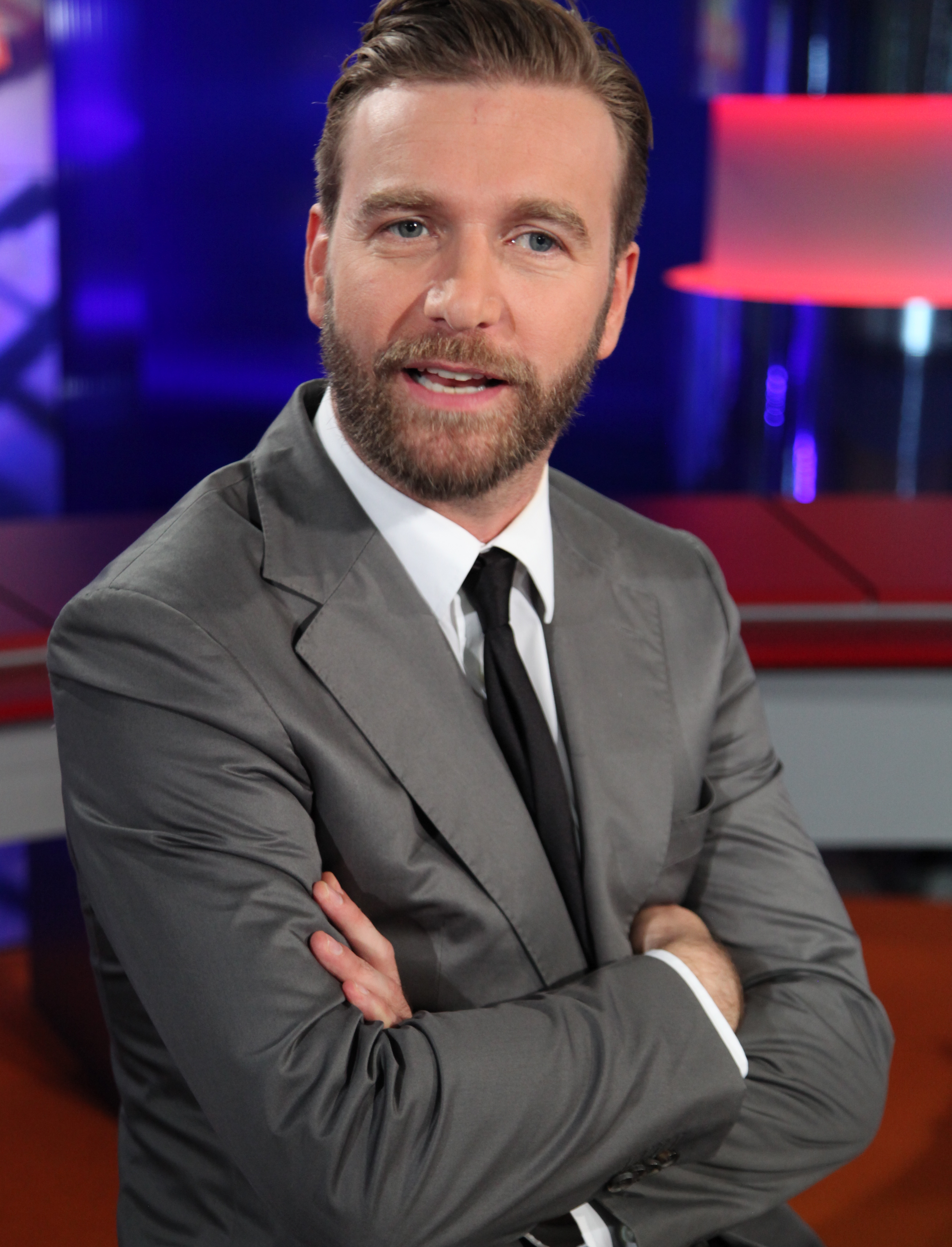
Ruf in 2011

Niels Ruf (born 21 May 1973) is a German television presenter, author and actor.

== Early life ==
Born in Worms, Ruf attended high school at Rhein-Wied-Gymnasium in Neuwied.

== Career ==
=== Writing ===
Ruf worked for one year at the German newspaper Rhein-Zeitung. He also wrote scripts for the German children's television program Clubhouse.

He worked as a columnist for publications including music magazine Intro, the weekly magazine Die Zeit, and Maxim.

=== Television ===
At 21 Ruf was cast by ZDF as the presenter of the video game show X Base. Afterwards he became the presenter of his own call-in show, Niels' Ruf, on DSF. The series was cancelled after nine episodes; Ruf later stated the cancellation was "because of blasphemy". He then worked as a freelance employee for Focus TV while pursuing acting opportunities.

Ruf was cast by German music television station Viva II in 1998 for the TV show Kamikaze, which he hosted and produced. His provocative monologues and announcements were characterised as "rabble-rousing". He earned a reputation as a "sex piglet" and "scandal-facilitator".

In 2002, Ruf started a hidden camera show, Dumm erwischt, in which people on the street had tricks played on them. Six episodes aired. In October 2006, Ruf hosted Die Niels Ruf Show on Sat.1's comedy channel. After criticism for low ratings, Ruf left Sat.1 and produced the internet-exclusive show Looki Looki. Deutsche Telekom cancelled the project in May 2011.

In 2007, Ruf played divorce attorney Simon C. Herzog in the sitcom Herzog. The series was cancelled due to poor ratings after three episodes. In 2008, the Niels Ruf Show ran on Sat1., but was cancelled early the same year due to bad ratings.

Ruf starred in a mockumentary web series Josef Gyrls – Tochter der Freiheit ("Josef Gyrls – Daughter of Freedom"). He appeared in the German version of Hell's Kitchen in the spring of 2014, but had to leave in the fifth episode due to an injury. In March 2016, he appeared in the ninth season of the German live dance show Let's Dance; he dropped out in the second round.

=== Films ===
Ruf appeared in the films Charley's Tante (1996), Und alles wegen Mama (1998) and Wie die Karnickel (2002).

In December 2001, Universal Mercury released a DVD titled Niels Ruf – Pest of Kamikaze 1998–2001, with excerpts and previously unpublished scenes from his Kamikaze program.

=== Music ===
In 2000, Ruf and German DJ WestBam covered Abwärts' song "Computerstaat" for the compilation Pop 2000.

== Personal life ==
Ruf briefly dated German actress and comedian Anke Engelke in 2000.

In June 2001, Ruf came under attack by the public when a report circulated alleging that he had made insensitive jokes about a colleague's skin cancer diagnosis. This led to his firing from the VIVA network. Ruf denied the allegations and threatened to sue for libel.

After making an insensitive tweet about German jazz/pop musician Roger Cicero's death in March 2016, Ruf was heavily criticized in the media. The incident caused his management team to part ways with him.

== Awards ==
- 2008: MIRA Award
- 2009: German Comedy Award (nomination)

== Filmography and TV ==
- 1996: Charley's Aunt
- 1998: Und alles wegen Mama
- 2002: Wie die Karnickel
- 2008: Herzog (television series)
- 2012: Josef Gyrls – Tochter der Freiheit (web series)
- 2013: Eins gegen Eins (season 4, episode 3)
- 2014: Hell's Kitchen (show)
- 2015: Im Knast (sitcom, ZDFneo, 1 episode)
- 2016: Let's Dance (show)
