= Liza Li =

German singer (born 1988)

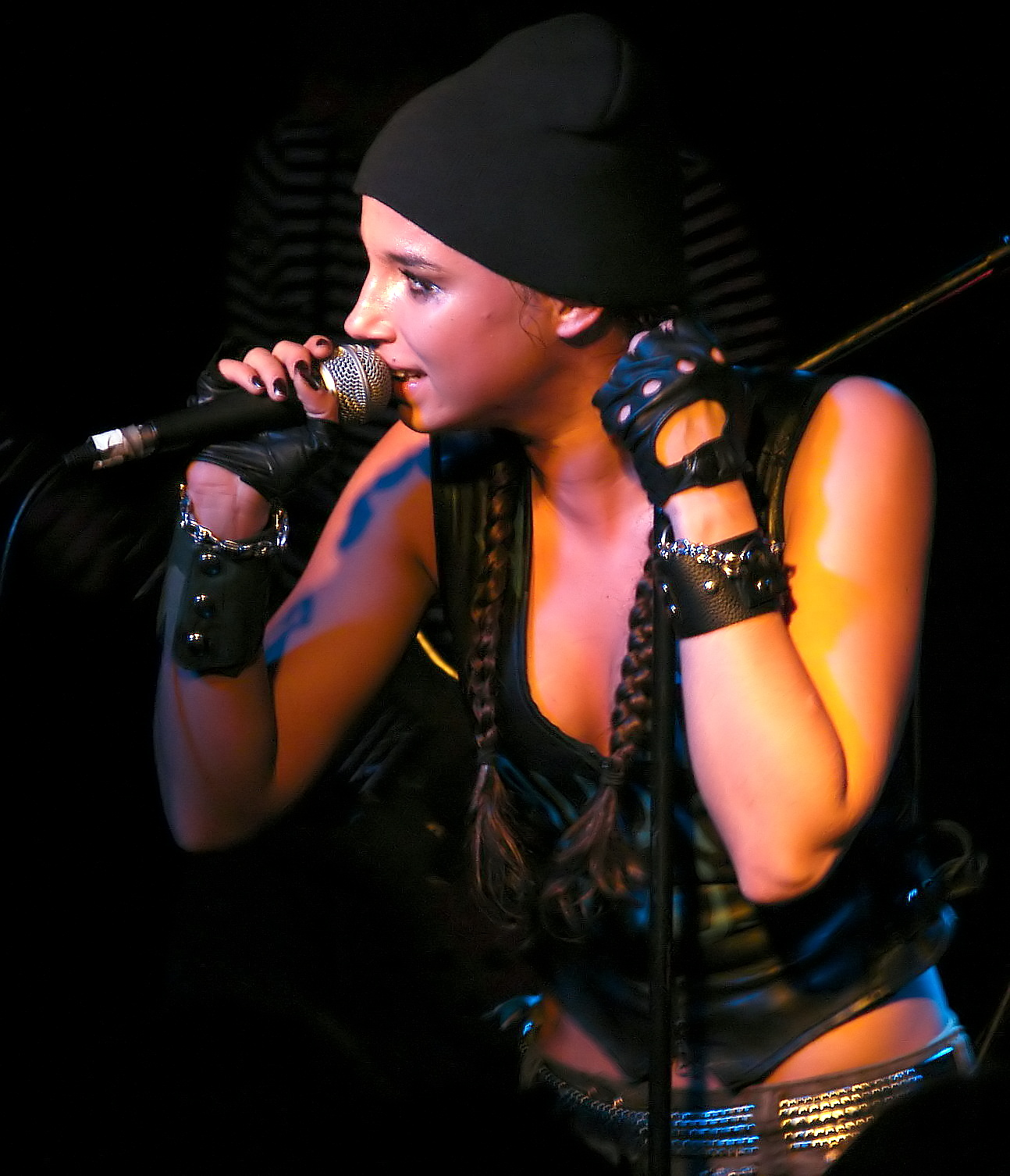
Liza Li

Liza Li (born Liza Wilke on March 30, 1988, in Düsseldorf) is a German singer. Her songtexts deal with the themes of love and violence as experienced by young women.

== Life ==
According to the biography of her record label Warner she moved out at the age of 14 years and lived at a friend's house and got her first musical experiences in a band.

Her first single "Ich könnte dich erschießen (I could shoot you)", as well as the songs on her album 18 released in autumn 2006, was written by Thorsten Börger who already wrote songs for Tic Tac Toe and Falco.

On November 19, 2007, she said she would work for the channel VIVA as a host. She's doing the shows Straßencharts and VIVY Top 100.

Liza appeared on the front cover of April 2008's issue of German Playboy.

== Discography ==
=== Singles ===
- "Ich könnte dich erschießen" (2006; Warner)
- "Sterben" (2006; Warner)
- "Zum Glück macht Liebe blind" (2007)

=== Albums ===
Album information
18
- Released: December 1, 2006

==== Track listing ====
1. "Liza Li"
2. "Ich könnte dich erschießen"
3. "Zum Glück mach Liebe blind"
4. "Sterben"
5. "Hörst du mich"
6. "Sex"
7. "Ihr armen Reichen"
8. "Ich will"
9. "Montag"
10. "Im Namen Gottes"
11. "Komm zurück" ( English Lyrics )
12. "Doktor Doktor"
