= Friendzone (TV series) =

- Genre: Reality
- Created by: SallyAnn Salsano; Damon Epps
- Country of origin: United States
- Original language: English
- No. of seasons: 5
- No. of episodes: 108

Production
- Executive producers: SallyAnn Salsano; Joel Zimmer; Stephanie Lydecker
- Producers: Jill Garelick Jeffrey Ruggles; Julie Van Groll; Josh Lansky; Erika Bryant; Krista Van Nieuwburg; Nicole Walberg; Timothy J. Hamilton; Sheonna Mix; Josh Peters
- Running time: 30 minutes
- Production company: 495 Productions

Original release
- Network: MTV
- Release: November 2, 2011 – December 2, 2014

Friendzone is a dating/relationship reality television series produced by 495 Productions and airing on MTV. The show follows people who have romantic feelings for one of their friends. SallyAnn Salsano created the show based upon one of her personal experiences. The theme song is "Two Hearts" by Keegan DeWitt. The show ended on December 2, 2014.

== Premise ==
Each episode of Friendzone features two stories. In each story, the person with romantic feelings (the crusher) wants to express these feelings to the target of his/her feelings (the crusher).

At the very beginning of the show, both crushers featured are introduced and each mentions their crushee. Of the 176 crusher-crushee pairs featured in seasons one through four, 157 are opposite-sex and 19 are same-sex (8 male pairs and 11 female pairs). Later both crushers mention the premise of the show. Each crusher tells the crushee that he or she is preparing for a blind date and asks the crushee for assistance. But the date is actually for the crushee. The crusher's goal is to get out of the "friend zone".

The first part of the show follows these preparations and the crusher speaks to the camera about their feelings towards the crushee. Often, the crusher talks about how nervous he or she is that the crushee will say yes or no. Some worry if the friendship will remain if the crushee refuses the date. The crushee will also talk to the camera about the crusher, often in a very positive but platonic manner, unaware of the crusher's feelings towards him or her.

After the crusher and crushee arrive at the location of the date, the crushee leaves the crusher ready for their date. On most stories, the crusher will then call back the crushee and then say that the blind date is really between the crusher and the crushee. The crushee will then respond to the crusher's feelings. Very rarely, the crusher gets cold feet and allows the crushee to walk away.

Sometimes the crushee will tell the crusher that the feelings are not mutual and suggest they remain friends. In these cases, the crusher will usually be upset and say so to the camera while the crushee will say their feelings as well.

Other times, the crushee will agree to the date. In these shows, the crusher will usually be very happy and show their joy to the camera. Then, the date will be shown. Not all dates wind up well. Some crushes have agreed to dates to be nice even though they really had no romantic feelings for the crusher and usually wind up mentioning the truth during or after the date, hurting the crusher's feelings. Other times, the date goes well and a relationship starts between the crusher and the crushee. In some cases, the crushee will already have romantic feelings for the crusher but was also too scared to express their feelings as well.

== Production ==
Five seasons of Friendzone have aired, featuring 216 crusher-crushee pairs in 108 episodes.

Most of the episodes of the first season took place in the Northeast. All of the episodes of the second season were based in Florida. The third season was filmed in the Midwest, including more than one episode with students from the University of Michigan. All of the episodes in season four took place in California, Oregon, or Washington.

For the fifth season, there were casting calls in Atlanta, Charlotte, and Nashville.

== Episodes ==
=== Season 1 ===
| Episode | Original Air Date | First Date Crusher | First Date Crushee | First Date Location | Second Date Crusher | Second Date Crushee | Second Date Location |
| 1 | November 1, 2011 | Gaby | Nick | Kings Park, New York | Connor | Brittanie | Huntington, New York |
| 2 | November 2, 2011 | Kevin | Janine | Old Bridge, New Jersey | Heather | Gary | Neptune, New Jersey |
| 3 | November 3, 2011 | Christie | Dylan | Somerset, New Jersey | Peter | Victoria | Freehold, New Jersey |
| 4 | November 4, 2011 | Alex | Anthony | Medford, New York | Dan | Katie | Little Silver, New Jersey |
| 5 | November 7, 2011 | Fitz | Michelle | New York City | Shelly | Anthony | Wading River, New York |
| 6 | November 8, 2011 | Jamie | Steve | Neptune City, New Jersey | Jackie | Frank | Manorville, New York |
| 7 | November 9, 2011 | Jeremy | Amanda | Manhattan, New York | Nate | Stephanie | North Haledon, New Jersey |
| 8 | November 10, 2011 | Angelica | John | Franklin Square, New York | Shivani | Parth | Lodi, New Jersey |
| 9 | November 18, 2011 | Katy | Brian | New York City | Jaci | Ed | Keansburg, New York (typo?) |
| 10 | November 21, 2011 | Polly | Tyler | West Long Branch, New Jersey | Stephanie | Josh | Bethpage, New York |
| 11 | November 22, 2011 | Stephanie | Mike | City Island, New Jersey (typo?) | Sean | Kate | Not listed |
| 12 | November 28, 2011 | B-Hawk | Toni | New York City | David | Maia | New York City |
| 13 | November 29, 2011 | Kris | Lauren | New City, New York | Rachel | Billy | Not listed |
| 14 | November 30, 2011 | Bryan | Megan | Not listed | Kenise | James | The Bronx, New York |
| 15 | December 7, 2011 | Krystal | Nishell | Yonkers, New York | Mike | Rachel | Not listed |
| 16 | December 8, 2011 | Alex | Chelsea | White Plains, New York | Asha | Chris | Radnor, Pennsylvania |
| 17 | December 20, 2011 | Aja | Charles | Philadelphia | Paulie | Bethany | Moonachie, New Jersey |
| 18 | December 20, 2011 | Danielle | Chris | Bridgewater, New Jersey | Jenna | Christie | Staten Island, New York |
| 19 | December 7, 2011 | Nicole | Chris | Philadelphia | Andrew | Sarah | Toms River, New Jersey |
| 20 | December 8, 2011 | Franklin | Erica | Philadelphia | Wayne | Megan | Palmyra, New Jersey |
| 21 | December 20, 2011 | Scott | Lauren | Forked River, New Jersey | Sid | Courtney | Toms River, New Jersey |
| 22 | December 20, 2011 | Melita | Marcus | Clifton, New Jersey | Brian | Samantha | Wall, New York (typo?) |

=== Season 2 ===
| Episode | Original Air Date | First Date Crusher | First Date Crushee | First Date Location | Second Date Crusher | Second Date Crushee | Second Date Location |
| 1 | May 29, 2012 | Yohamna | James | Tampa, Florida | Joe | Lacey | Plant City, Florida |
| 2 | May 30, 2012 | Cassie | Sean | Lutz, Florida | Nyk | Katie | Spring Hill, Florida |
| 3 | May 31, 2012 | Antonio | Megan | Bartow, Florida | Stormy | Grover | Gibsonton, Florida |
| 4 | June 1, 2012 | Jojo | Sydney | Madeira Beach, Florida | Kristen | Jeremiah | Tampa, Florida |
| 5 | June 5, 2012 | Nicole | Tom | Indian Rocks, Florida | Agape | Jen | Ybor City, Florida |
| 6 | June 6, 2012 | Spenser | Blanca | Tampa, Florida | Nazzy | Joel | Tampa, Florida |
| 7 | June 11, 2012 | Amy | Tino | Tampa, Florida | Tonee | Ryan | Plant City, "NY" (typo?) |
| 8 | June 13, 2012 | Caiti | Kevin | Plant City, Florida | Jarvis | Naz | Brandon, Florida |
| 9 | June 14, 2012 | Ryan | Taylor | Bradenton, Florida | Ashley | Colin | Tampa, Florida |
| 10 | June 15, 2012 | Danny | Sabra | Orlando, Florida | Travis | Kelly | Orlando, Florida |
| 11 | June 18, 2012 | Luna | Lola | Orlando, Florida | Carleen | Jessica | Orlando, Florida |
| 12 | June 19, 2012 | Bianca | Taylor | Orlando, Florida | Tanner | Keleigh | Sarasota, Florida |
| 13 | June 22, 2012 | Lauren | Travis | Tampa, Florida | Chris | Terra | St. Petersburg, Florida |
| 14 | June 25, 2012 | Megan | Jake | Tampa, Florida | Joey | Bebo | Orlando, Florida |
| 15 | June 26, 2012 | Mariah | Jorge | Tampa, Florida | Dane | Jennifer | Tampa, Florida |
| 16 | June 29, 2012 | Justice | Kayla | Orlando, Florida | Andrew | Liz | Orlando, Florida |
| 17 | July 2, 2012 | Memo | Steph | Bradenton, Florida | Percy | Jasmine | Orlando, Florida |
| 18 | July 5, 2012 | Andrew | Brittany | Orlando, Florida | Myke | Seanna | Orlando, Florida |
| 19 | July 6, 2012 | Alex | Ahijah | Tampa, Florida | James | Lauren | Tampa, Florida |
| 20 | July 10, 2012 | Stephanie | Shorty | Sarasota, Florida | Mary-Kate | Austin | Orlando, Florida |
| 21 | July 11, 2012 | Lauren | Daren | Orlando, Florida | Juan | Hope | Orlando, Florida |
| 22 | July 12, 2012 | Robin | Chelsey | Sarasota, Florida | Tyler | Lauren | Sarasota, Florida |

=== Season 3 ===
| Episode | Original Air Date | First Date Crusher | First Date Crushee | First Date Location | Second Date Crusher | Second Date Crushee | Second Date Location |
| 1 | January 22, 2013 | Crystal | Kenny | Palatine, Illinois | Chris | Stephanie | Chicago |
| 2 | January 23, 2013 | Michelle | Andrew | Chicago | Tanesha | Fred | Chicago |
| 3 | January 24, 2013 | Annie | Wes | Plainfield, Illinois | Josh | Kelly | Skokie, Illinois |
| 4 | January 25, 2013 | Matt | Jessie | Plainville, Illinois | Maria | Jonathan | Chicago |
| 5 | January 28, 2013 | Adauto | Diana | Chicago | Josie | Dalton | Hoffman Estates, Illinois |
| 6 | January 29, 2013 | Shawn | Alex | Greenfield, Wisconsin | Sandra | Jellie | Milwaukee |
| 7 | January 30, 2013 | Paige | Tahj | Beloit, Wisconsin | Kim | Dan | Milwaukee |
| 8 | January 31, 2013 | Alex | Raine | Chicago | Dan | Candace | Chicago |
| 9 | February 1, 2013 | Manny | Mack | Markham, Illinois | James | Sam | Elmhurst, Illinois |
| 10 | February 5, 2013 | John | Leah | Ann Arbor, Michigan | Clarissa | Joe | Southfield, Michigan |
| 11 | February 6, 2013 | Day | Curtis | Northville, Michigan | Derian | Kelsey | Northville, Michigan |
| 12 | February 11, 2013 | Tebyus | Jasmine | Brown Deer, Wisconsin | Alec | Felicia | Milwaukee |
| 13 | February 12, 2013 | Kat | Alla | Milwaukee | Maya | Mike | Hartfield, Wisconsin (sp?) |
| 14 | February 13, 2013 | Nick | Amber | Livonia, Michigan | Ben | Chris | Armada, Michigan |
| 15 | February 15, 2013 | Will | Keke | Flossmoor, Illinois | Trey | Ashley | Milwaukee |
| 16 | February 19, 2013 | Sieria | Richard | Whitefish Bay, Wisconsin | Alantae | Janay | Belleville, Michigan |
| 17 | February 20, 2013 | Connor | Ally | Commerce, Michigan | Grace | Mike | Ann Arbor, Michigan |
| 18 | February 22, 2013 | Rob | Sara | St. Clair Shores, Michigan | Gabriella | Darryl | Detroit |
| 19 | February 25, 2013 | Cameron | Briana | Lincoln Park, Illinois | Martrell | Raven | Chicago |
| 20 | February 26, 2013 | Amanda | Adam | Ann Arbor, Michigan | Nichole | Derek | Oak Creek, Wisconsin |
| 21 | Unknown | Ty | Missy | West Bloomfield, Michigan | Tiara | Matt | Farmington, Michigan |
| 22 | Unknown | Kim | Bryan | Holbrook, New York | Mike | Sarah | St. Clair Shores, Michigan |

=== Season 4 ===
| Episode | Original Air Date | First Date Crusher | First Date Crushee | First Date Location | Second Date Crusher | Second Date Crushee | Second Date Location |
| 1 | September 9, 2013 | Sara | Ricky | San Francisco | Ricardo | Marco | San Francisco |
| 2 | September 10, 2013 | Sophia | Pascal | Santa Cruz, California | Vanessa | Sam | Santa Cruz, California |
| 3 | September 11, 2013 | Gaylen | Melissa | San Francisco | Simon | Crystal | El Sobrante, California |
| 4 | September 12, 2013 | Mikey | Frankie | Union City, California | Garrett | Lauren | Berkeley, California |
| 5 | September 16, 2013 | Mackenzie | Riley | Corvallis, Oregon | George | Sandra | Eugene, Oregon |
| 6 | September 17, 2013 | Monica | Gabe | Oakland, California | Tiger | Marcus | Pacifica, California |
| 7 | September 18, 2013 | Jon | Georgia | Eugene, Oregon | Bo | Brooke | Seattle |
| 8 | September 23, 2013 | Marie | Barrington | Eugene, Oregon | Jazzmin | Korey | Hayward, California |
| 9 | September 24, 2013 | Colton | Colton | Seattle | Rome | Stephanie | Seattle |
| 10 | September 26, 2013 | Armani | Ameerah | Berkeley, California | Mackenzie | Jeremy | Hayward, California |
| 11 | September 27, 2013 | Jimmy | Megan | Seattle | Kitty | Sam | Duvall, WA |
| 12 | September 27, 2013 | Kyle | Christine | Eugene, Oregon | Tatum | Andy | Eugene, Oregon |
| 13 | September 30, 2013 | Cassidy | Ben | Lodi, California | Celeste | Lilah | Berkeley, California |
| 14 | October 1, 2013 | AJ | Pedro | Seattle | Rosa | Aaron | Seattle |
| 15 | October 2, 2013 | Liliana | Shaq | Puyallup, WA | Kris | Demi | Tacoma, WA |
| 16 | October 3, 2013 | Diego | Jackie | Kingston, WA | Parker | Hunter | Seattle |
| 17 | October 4, 2013 | Jessica | Adam | Seattle | Zac | Ashley | Seattle |
| 18 | October 7, 2013 | Amara | David | Normandy Park, WA | Kitty | Anthony | Seattle |
| 19 | October 8, 2013 | Taylor | Connor | Seattle | Chris | Kate | Seattle |
| 20 | October 9, 2013 | Javier | Ashley | Bellevue, WA | Taylor | Mecos | Auburn, WA |
| 21 | October 10, 2013 | Brie | Rob | Mountain View, California | Evan | Maria | Mountain View, California |
| 22 | October 11, 2013 | Anthony | Alex | Snohomish, WA | Jordan | Sam | Seattle |
