= Michael Wigge =

Michael Wigge is a German travel writer, television producer and entertainment personality in Europe and in the United States. Wigge has created several travel documentary programs that were viewed in Europe and the United States.

== Biography ==
In 2002, Wigge stated working on TV broadcaster VIVA. He also presented comedy clips on the British daily show London Calling. On that program, Wigge made what was called the longest donkey ride in music television history. On his ride, dressed as Henry VIII, Wigge visited Queen Elizabeth on her 50th jubilee at Buckingham Palace.

In 2003, Wigge returned to Germany to work on the comedy program The Chancellor’s Bungalow on WDR. He portrayed the satirical reporter “Dr. Wigge” doing interviews with the Chancellor of Germany and the President of Germany.

From 2004 to 2006, Wigge interviewed celebrities for Sarah Kuttner – Die Show (VIVA and MTV). Under the heading “Wigge on a Mission” he conducted interviews using insane quirks and confusing statements. Ben Stiller wants to cancel the interview, Halle Berry puts Wigge's eyelash in her décolleté and Angelina Jolie calls him a “crazy but fantastic man”. Wigge also appeared on the ARD Morning Show”as a special reporter for the Olympics Summer Games and the 2004 European Football Championship. Wigge also produced Wigge BIG in Japan (VIVA, 2004) and Kulturschock (MTV, 2006). While produced Kulturschock, Wigge lived with the Sanema Indians in the Amazon rain forest.

From 2007 to 2010, Wigge produced the series Wigge and the Truth about Germany and Land of Loveliness on Deutsche Welle TV. He received the platinum award in the category “On-Air Talent” at the 41st Houston World Film Festival in 2008. In 2008, Wigge worked as a reporter for GEO in Canada.

In 2009, Wigge receives the ZDF VJ Award in the category “Best Newcomer Video Journalist”. In 2010, “How to Travel the World for Free” is the first collaboration with ZDFneo and is also published as a book in Germany. The documentary series (5 x 30 min., ZDFneo broadcast May / June 2010) was awarded the Accolade Award of Merit for Best Feature Documentation in the U.S. in 2011 and was nominated for the Grimme Award 2011 in the category “entertainment”, Germany most relevant journalist award. The series is renamed “How to Travel the World for FREE” for the international market.

In 2011, Wigge produced the TV series Wigges Tauschrausch (How to Barter for Paradise). In this series, he travels the world, bartering from an apple to a house in Hawaii. This entertainment series has been broadcast on ZDFneo and is published as a book.

In 2012, Wigge published the book How to Travel the World for FREE. The accompanying series was broadcast on PBS channels in the US. During the press campaign, Wigge appeared on the Tonight Show with Jay Leno. He later appeared in the LA Times, USA Today and on the Today Show.

In 2013, Wigge crossed Germany on a Mibo Mastr scooter – 2,500 kilometers in 80 days and published this project as a TV series and a book in Germany. In the same year, he traveled through Switzerland for free for 3Sat television. How to Travel the World for free and How to Barter for Paradise were published in winter 2013/2014 by Skyhorse Publishing in the US. “

Wigge has lived in Hawaii since 2013.

== Criticism ==
Some have criticized Wigge for downplaying the production elements that go into his traveling, such as plane tickets and back-up financing, that delegitimize claims of "low-budget" travel.
