= MTV (Germany) =

German television channel

MTV Germany
- Country: Germany
- Broadcast area: Germany; Austria; Liechtenstein; Luxembourg; Switzerland
- Headquarters: Berlin, Germany

Programming
- Languages: German; English
- Picture format: 1080i HDTV (downscaled to 16:9 576i for the SDTV feed)

Ownership
- Owner: Skydance Europe and Africa

History
- Launched: 7 March 1997; 29 years ago
- Replaced: MTV Europe

Links
- Website: www.mtv.de

Screenshot of MTV Germany (2011)

MTV is a German free-to-air television channel operated by Paramount Global. The channel launched on 7 March 1997 as MTV Central, as part of a regionalisation strategy by MTV Networks Europe, replacing MTV Europe in Germany.

== Availability ==
The channel primarily serves Germany, Austria and Switzerland, however it is widely available across Europe free-to-air.

Between 2011 and 2017, the channel moved behind a paywall, limiting its availability mainly to German-speaking territories. On 24 November 2017 a free-to-air standard definition feed was added to Astra 19.2°E with German and English audio tracks.

It is available in Germany through Sky Deutschland, Unitymedia, Pÿur, Astra, Deutsche Telekom and Vodafone. In Switzerland, Sky and Astra. In Austria, through A1, Sky, Astra and Magenta.

== History ==
=== 1997–2001 ===
Since 1993, Germany was served by VIVA as a 24-hour German music channel, while MTV was only broadcast in English through MTV Europe. In 1997, as part of MTV Networks Europe's regionalization strategy, MTV launched a German-speaking channel to target existing competition within the German-speaking markets. MTV Germany launched with specialized German-speaking versions of hit MTV Europe shows which included the Euro Top 20, MTV Select, MTV News, Non-Stop Hits, US Top 20 Hitlist UK, Hitlist Germany, Fashion Zone, MTV Urban and The Lick.

In 1999, MTV Germany became available free-to-air throughout Europe on Astra satellite. In 2001, MTV Networks Germany launched MTV2 Pop, a 24-hour pop music channel (later replaced by Nickelodeon).

=== 2002–2010 ===
In 2002, MTV Germany began to air programming from MTV US. Most of this programming was either subtitled or dubbed. From 2002 onwards, similar to other MTV channels in Europe, MTV Germany began to drop some of its localized programming in favour of MTV US shows. These shows included Jackass, Date My Mom, Pimp My Ride and Dismissed.

In 2005, MTV owner Viacom purchased its biggest German competitor VIVA.

In early 2006, MTV began to further regionalize its German-speaking feed to include a separate version for Austria and Switzerland. Late in 2009, MTV Networks Germany helped to localize these channels even further with the development of MTV Austria and MTV Switzerland.

From 2008, MTV Germany was also streamed on P2P TV network TVU Player, but was taken off air in March 2009. As of 2009, MTV Germany used the same on-air identity as other MTV channels in Europe. The channel also featured fewer music videos and aired more American MTV shows than German-speaking programming. Most of this programming was subtitled in German. The headquarters for MTV Networks Germany is Berlin. MTV Germany remains one of the only remaining MTV transmitted by analogue satellite in Europe, and among the few transmitted on free-to-air digital services throughout the continent, along with MTV Austria, MTV Italia, MTV Adria and MTV Türkiye.

=== 2011–2021 ===
From 1 January 2011, MTV Germany was only available on major German pay TV platforms including Sky, Unitymedia, Telekom, and Kabel BW. With the move from a free-to-air to a subscription based service, MTV Germany no longer hosted advertising on its subscription service channel. MTV Germany continued to commission new music programming which included MTV Brand New, MTV Top 11, 3 From 1, The Breakfast Club, Fantastic Music Videos, and M is for Music. Localized programming continued with MTV Home, a German language music and entertainment show. Similar to MTV channels worldwide, MTV Germany aired reality shows including the American version of Skins and new seasons of Jersey Shore, Punk'd, When I Was 17, and the Lauren Conrad Fashion Show.

MTV Germany's sister channel VIVA became the main music station for MTV Networks Germany and continued to be available free-to-air across Germany, Austria and Europe. MTV Networks Germany also launched a new music channel called MTV Brand: New which focused on the new music releases from German-speaking and international artists.

On 16 May 2011 MTV Networks in Germany launched high-definition versions of MTV, VIVA and Nickelodeon. MTV HD, VIVA HD and Nickelodeon/Comedy Central HD are a simulcast of the original MTV channels already available in Germany. MTV rebranded on 1 July 2011 to embrace the new global on-air identity, sharing the same new MTV logo from the US.

MTV started streaming for free on mtv.de in 2017, geo-locked to Germany. This stream was removed in 2024. MTV also began broadcasting free-to-air over the Astra 19.2E satellite in SD on 4 December 2017. MTV brought back several music programs the same day, including M is for Music, MTV Most Wanted, MTV Classics, MTV Rockzone, MTV Urban, MTV Likes, and MTV Crush. VIVA Top 100 moved to MTV and was renamed to MTV Top 100. Music programming became the main focus of the channel by 2018, taking up more than 80% of daily airtime. Sister station VIVA was closed on 31 December 2018, making MTV the only remaining mainstream music television channel in Germany.

=== 2021 onwards ===
In September 2021, MTV Germany rebranded to reflect the current branding and logo of all international MTV channels. A major revamp of the network's schedule was done in 2022, introducing and reviving several blocks including MTV In The Mix, Guess The Year, 3 From 1, RockZone, Alternative Nation, Headbangers Ball, Yo! MTV Raps, Dancefloor, Party Zone, and Chill Out Zone. More blocks, including MTV 80s, MTV 90s, MTV 00s, MTV All Nighter, Brand New, and This Week's Hot 20, were introduced in 2023.

MTV Germany abruptly discontinued most of its music video blocks save for MTV In The Mix (which proceeded to take up most of the network's schedule at the time), MTV 80s, MTV 90s, MTV 00s, and Guess the Year on 11 August 2025. No official announcement was made prior, though playlists for some of the final episodes of several blocks included songs such as "The Bitter End" and "Don't Look Back in Anger", with last minute schedule changes adding extended final episodes of Party Zone and Chill Out Zone and themed blocks focused on "I Want My MTV" and "The Art of Music Video". The first two videos played on MTV In The Mix under the new schedule were "Fuck You" by Lily Allen and "Fuck You" by CeeLo Green. The amount of music videos played each day slowly shrank in the following months.

MTV Germany ceased broadcasting music videos entirely on 31 December 2025, coinciding with the closure of several MTV music video networks across Europe, South America, and Africa. The final showing of MTV In The Mix played songs alluding to the end, with the final video played being "Musique Non-Stop" by Kraftwerk. MTV Germany remains on the air, but now only plays reality and scripted series, as stipulated per a late 2025 revision to its license from the Czech regulator RRTV.

== MTV+ ==
Logo of MTV+

MTV+ was the timeshare service of MTV Germany. It replaced the Nicknight block on 1 November 2018 and aired from 8:15 pm to 5 am on Nickelodeon Germany. The block wasn't available on Nick Austria and Nick Switzerland, where the Nicknight brand was used until 1 October 2021. On 1 March 2021, MTV+ was replaced by Comedy Central +1.

== VJs ==
Previous VJs

- Palina Rojinski (2009 – 2011 / 2019) Yo! MTV Raps
- MC Bogy (2019) Yo! MTV Raps
- Aminata Belli (2019) MTV Top 100, Yo! MTV Raps Weekly Vibes
- Alex Barbian (2019) Yo! MTV Raps Weekly Vibes
- Uli Brase (2017) - MTV Buzz, MTV Top 100
- Jan Köppen (2017 – 2019) MTV Top 100

== On-air design ==
On 7 September 2008 MTV Germany changed their old Wishful Object on-air design to a new MTV: All Eyes On... design, which is also MTV Germany's new slogan. The on-air design was changed once more in July 2009 as a result of re-branding of all MTV channels (excluding MTV US).

MTV Germany also has an advertising agency named Dydree, although it also works for other companies like ARD and Disney.

== All Eyes On... ==
All Eyes On... is one of MTV Germany's ways of highlighting singers and bands that have released new music (and also might not already be widely known). Changing bi-weekly, an artist or group is chosen and then featured in clips announcing commercial breaks. The first band name to be put under the "All Eyes On" badge was MIA.; on 6 October, the first non-German artist was Alicia Keys.

== See also ==
- MTV Adria
- MTV Austria
- MTV Switzerland
