= MTV (Austrian TV channel) =

MTV Austria
- Headquarters: Vienna, Austria

Ownership
- Owner: MTV Networks Europe

History
- Launched: 2006
- Replaced: MTV Germany
- Closed: January 1, 2011
- Replaced by: MTV Germany

MTV Austria was an Austrian free-to-air television channel, launched as a localized subscription feed of MTV Germany for the Austrian market, replacing the German feed of MTV. MTV Austria featured local advertising and a weekly local show named Music & Style featuring music and special events from Austria. The channel often showed different music videos from its German counterpart, aiming at more rock-oriented music which is more popular in Austria.
