= Nicktoons (German TV channel) =

German pay television channel

- Country: Germany
- Broadcast area: Germany; Austria; Switzerland; Liechtenstein; Luxembourg
- Headquarters: Berlin, Germany

Programming
- Languages: English; German
- Picture format: 576i (16:9 SDTV)

Ownership
- Owner: Paramount Media Networks
- Parent: Nickelodeon Group
- Sister channels: Nickelodeon, Nick Jr.

History
- Launched: December 2007; 18 years ago (as Nick Premium); March 2010; 16 years ago (as Nicktoons)
- Former names: Nick Premium (2007–2010)

Links
- Website: www.nicktoons.de (2010 archive link, now redirects to nick.de)

Nicktoons (formerly known as Nick Premium from 2007–2010) is a German pay television channel owned by Paramount Networks EMEAA.

== History ==
Nicktoons was launched in December 2007 as Nick Premium; it aired some of Nickelodeon's live-action and 1990s shows on the network.

In 2009, Nickelodeon announced that Nick Premium would be rebranded as Nicktoons. On 31 March 2010 at 6:04 am, Nick Premium was rebranded as Nicktoons. Some of the programs aired on Nick Premium were removed from the network after Nicktoons was launched. The network airs 24 hours a day.

On 30 June 2014, Sky Deutschland removed Nicktoons from its platform. No reason was given for the decision. Sky, though, stresses in the statement that its focus lies on the expansion of its HD proposition. Nicktoons, however, had only been available in SD. Nicktoons remains available in Germany on the cable networks of Unitymedia and Kabel BW and within the mobile TV offering of Deutsche Telekom among other carriage partners.

On 1 April 2020, the channel returned on Sky Deutschland as a replacement for Disney XD, which closed in Germany the same day.

== See also ==
- Nickelodeon (Germany)
- Nick Jr.
- Nicktoons (American TV channel)
