= List of Malayalam-language radio stations =

== All India Radio stations ==
=== AM/MW radio stations ===
- All India Radio Thiruvananthapuram - 1161
- All India Radio Alapuzha - 576
- All India Radio Thrissur - 630
- All India Radio Kozhikode - 684
- All India Radio Kavaratti - 1584

=== SW radio stations ===
- All India Radio Thiruvananthapuram - 5010,7290 (inactive)

=== FM radio stations ===
- All India Radio Ananthapuri FM -Thiruvananthapuram -101.9
- All India Radio MW Relay Station -Pathanamthitta-101.1
- All India Radio MW Relay Station -Kayamkulam-101.1
- All India Radio Kochi 102.3
- AIR FM Rainbow Kochi -107.5 (Music Channel)
- All India Radio Thrissur - 103
- All India Radio Devikulam (Idukki district) - 101.4
- All India Radio Real FM - Kozhikode - 103.6
- All India Radio Manjeri FM (Malappuram district) -102.7
- All India Radio Kannur - 101.5

== Private radio (FM and AM) stations ==
=== Kannur ===
- Radio Mango 91.9 (Malayala Manorama Group)
- Red FM 93.5 (Sun Network)
- Club FM 94.3 (Mathrubhumi)
- Best FM 95 (Asianet Star Communications) - inactive

=== Kozhikode ===
- Radio Mango 91.9 (Malayala Manorama Group)
- Radio Mirchi 92.7 (Times Group)
- Red FM 93.5 (Sun Network)
- Club FM 104.8 (Mathrubhumi)

=== Thrissur ===
- Red FM 95 (Sun Network)
- Radio Mango 91.9 (Malayala Manorama Group)
- Club FM 94.3 (Mathrubhumi)
- Best FM 95 (Asianet Star Communications)

=== Kochi ===
- Radio Mango 91.9 (Malayala Manorama Group)
- Red FM 93.5 (Sun Network)
- Club FM 94.3 (Mathrubhumi)
- Radio Mirchi 104.0 (Times Group)

=== Alappuzha ===
- Radio Mango 92.7 (Malayala Manorama Group)
- Club FM 104.8 (Mathrubhumi)

=== Thiruvananthapuram ===
- 92.7 BIG FM (Reliance Anil Dhirubhai Ambani Group)
- Red FM 93.5 (Sun Network)
- Club FM 94.3 (Mathrubhumi)
- Radio Mirchi 98.3 (Times Group)

== Outside Kerala ==
- Dubai
1. Asianet Radio 657AM
2. Radio Asia 1269 AM
3. Radio Me 95.3 FM
4. Hit FM 96.7
5. Oxygen FM 102.4
6. Radio Mango 96.2

== Community FM Radio stations ==
Kerala has 12 Community FM Radio stations .

- Thiruvananthapuram
1. Radio DC 90.4 - (Community Radio by DC School of Management and Technology)
2. Kuttanad FM 90.0 (Farm Information Bureau)
3. Karunasai Radio 91.2 FM - Vellanad
- Kollam
1. Community Radio Benziger 107.8 ( Bishop Benziger Nursing College) - Kollam City
2. Ente Radio 91.2 (Kerala Rural Development Agency) - Kulasekharapuram
3. Ashraya FM 90 (Ashraya Charitable Society) - Kottarakara
4. Radio Saanthwanam 90.4 FM (Pain and Palliative Care Trust)
- Pathanamthitta
1. Radio MACFAST 90.4 - (Community Radio by Mar Athanasios College for Advanced Studies) - Thiruvalla
- Alappuzha
1. Global Radio 91.2 FM - (Global Education Net) - Ambalappuzha
2. Radio Neythal 107.8 (Diocese of Alleppey) - Alappuzha
3. Chetna Radio 90.4 FM (Ashraya Charitable Society)
- Kottayam
1. Radio Media Village 90.8 (St. Joseph College of Communication) - Changanassery
2. Radio Mangalam 91.2 (Mangalam College of Engineering) - Ettumanoor
3. Sargakshetra FM 89.6 (Sargakshetra Charitable Trust) - Mannanam
4. Radio 90 FM (Amal Jyothi College of Engineering) - Koovappally
- Palakkad
1. Ahalia FM 90.4 (Ahalia Healthcare Group) - IIT Palakkad
- Wayanad
1. Radio Maattoli 90.4 (Wayanad Social Service Society) - Nalloornad - Kerala's first community radio service, it primarily caters farmers and tribals.
- Kannur
1. Janvani 90.8 (Academic and Technical Education Development Society) - Panoor
2. Radio Malabar 89.6 FM (Salil Sivdas Foundation) - Mattanur
- Thrissur
1. Hello Radio 90.8 (Kidney Federation of India) - Thrissur
2. My Radio 90 FM (Snehapoorvam Educational Charitable Trust) - Ayyanthol
- Ernakulam
1. Radio Kochi 90 FM (St. Teresa's College) - Kochi
- Kozhikode
1. Care FM 89.6 (Healthcare Foundation) - Poonoor
- Kasaragod
1. Radio For You 89.6 FM (Tellicherry Social Service Society) - Kanhangad

== See also ==
- Media in Kerala
