= Media in Kerala =

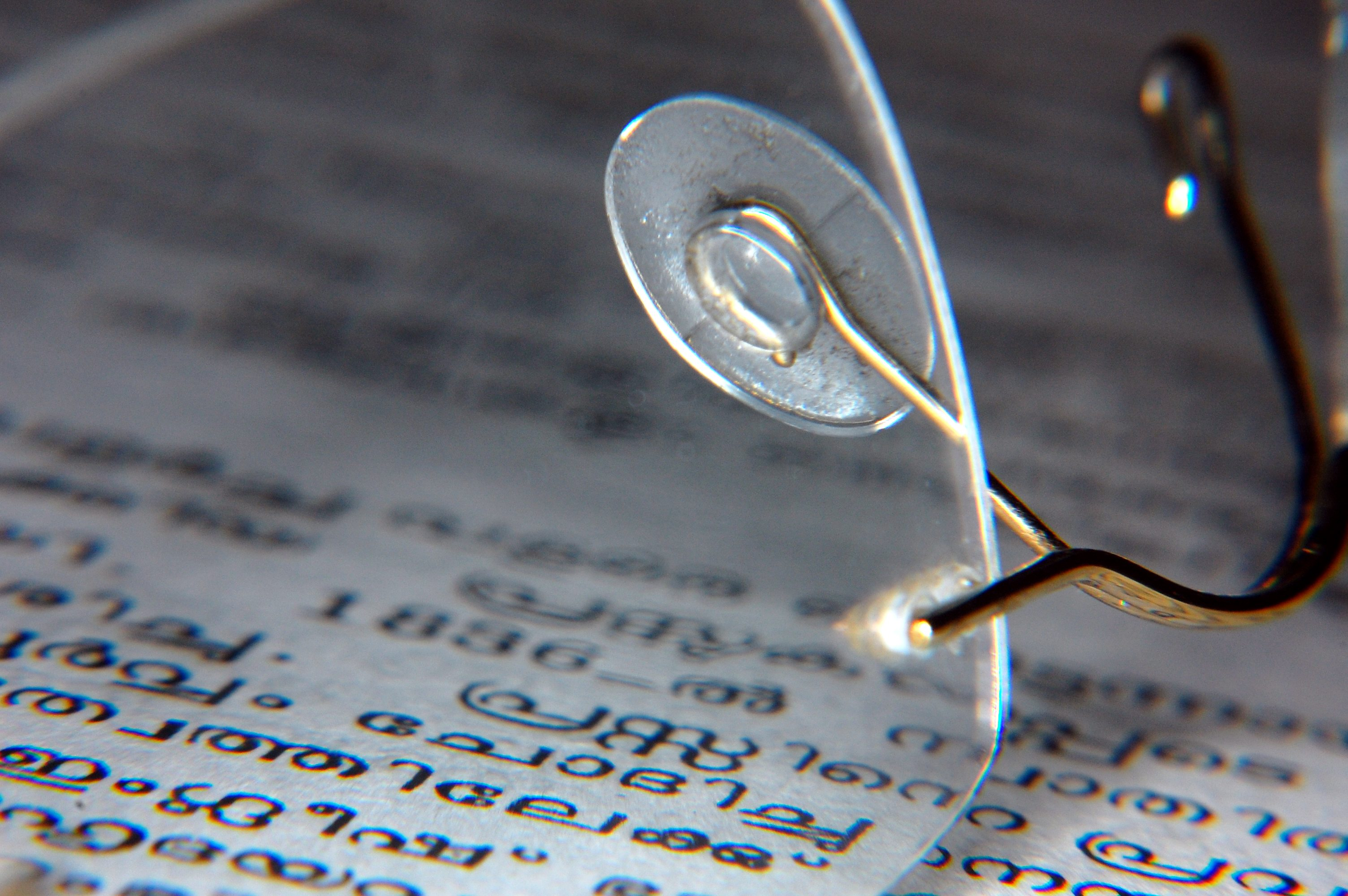
Printed Malayalam magnified by spectacles.

Media in Kerala, India are widely accessible and cater to a wide variety of audiences. Kerala has the highest media exposure in India with newspapers publishing in nine languages, mainly English and Malayalam.

== Print media ==
=== Newspapers ===
Dozens of newspapers are published in Kerala. The principal languages of publication are Malayalam and English. The most widely circulating List of Malayalam-language newspapers include Malayala Manorama, Mathrubhumi, Deshabhimani,Madhyamam, Kerala Kaumudi, Suprabhaatham, Siraj Daily, Veekshanam, Deepika, Mangalam, Janayugom, Thejas, Varthamanam, Chandrika, Janmabhumi, Udaya Keralam and Metro Vaartha.

=== Magazines ===
Among list of Malayalam periodicals major Malayalam periodicals are Mathrubhumi weekly, Madhyamam weekly, India Today Malayalam, Dhanam, Chithrabhumi, Balarama (Comics), Thejas, Kanyaka and Bhashaposhini.

Readership of top Malayalam dailies (based on Indian Readership Survey, 2010)
Daily	Readership (in lakh)
Malayala Manorama	100
Mathrubhumi	90
Madhyamam	80
Mangalam	7.14

The following table is according to the Indian Readership Survey (IRS) 2019 Quarter 1.

Rank	Name of the magazine	Average Issue Readership (in lakh)
1	Malayala Manorama Vanitha	7028
2	Mathrubhumi Arogyamasika	2683
3	Mathrubhumi Thozhilvartha	2605
4	Malayala Manorama Balarama	2542
5	Mathrubhumi Grihalakshmi	2423

== Television ==
Doordarshan the state-owned television broadcaster started the commercial television broadcast in Kerala with the channel 'DD Malayalam' on 1 January 1985 from Kudappanakkunnu, Thiruvananthapuram. Malayalam started with a one-hour slot (6.30 PM -7:30 PM IST) daily followed by a 10-minute news bulletin in malayalam. During initial phase Malayalam programs that originated from Doordarshan were available only within 15 km radius of the station.

Multi system operators provide a mix of Malayalam, English, and international channels. The first group to enter the television field was Asianet in 1993, followed by Surya TV in 1998. Kairali TV started broadcast in the year 2000. Multiple channels then started broadcasting including general entertainment channels like (ACV NEWS), Jeevan TV, Amrita TV, JaiHind TV, Asianet Plus, Surya Movies, Kairali We, Mazhavil Manorama, Flowers TV, Zee Keralam etc., news channels like Asianet News, Reporter TV, Manorama News, Kairali News, Mathrubhumi News, Shekinah News ,MediaOne TV, News18 Kerala, 24 News, Janam TV and religious channels like Harvest TV, Harvest USA TV, Harvest Arabia, Harvest India, Shalom TV, Power Vision TV. The only government owned channel in Malayalam is Kite Victers (Versatile ICT Enabled Resource for Students), an edutainment channel which is working under KITE of General Education department, Kerala.

== Radio ==
In Kerala, Radio had a very vital role in communication. During colonial rule, the erstwhile Travancore state set up the first Radio Station in Kerala. The Princely State of Travancore has granted sanction for setting up a radio broadcasting station at Thiruvananthapuram on 30 September 1937. The radio station was called 'Travancore State Broadcasting Station' and was inaugurated on 12 March 1943 by Sri Chithira Thirunal Balarama Varma. During Initial phase of transmission two hours of radio broadcasting on Friday evenings were aired by the station. After Independence when state of Travancore joined in Indian Union, the 'Travancore State Broadcasting Station' was merged with Akashvani from 1 April 1950. Radio Alakal, the first Community radio in the state, started narrowcasting from Trivandrum on 1 May 2006. Kerala's First Campus based community radio Radio MACFAST 90.4 started broadcasting from MACFAST College(Mar Athanasios College for Advanced Studies, Tiruvalla) on 1 November 2009. Kerala's First private FM station, Radio Mango, was launched on 29 November 2007 in Calicut, sparking off the FM revolution in the state. Today, Kerala has a host of private FM channels that are fast gaining influence among its population.

=== Private FM Stations inside Kerala ===
- Thiruvananthapuram
1. Club FM 94.3 (The Mathrubhumi Printing And Publishing Co Ltd)
2. BIG FM 92.7 (Reliance Group)
3. Radio Mirchi 98.3 (Entertainment Network India Limited)
4. Red FM 93.5 (Sun TV Network)
5. Radio DC - Community Radio Station (DC School of Management and Technology)
- Kollam
1. Radio Benziger 107.8 - Community Radio Station (Bishop Benziger Hospital)
- Karunagappalli
1. Ente Radio 91.2 - Community Radio Station
- Ambalappuzha
1. Global Radio 91.2 FM- Community Radio Station
- Alappuzha
1. Club FM 104.8 (The Mathrubhumi Printing And Publishing Co Ltd)
1. Radio Mango 92.7 (The Malayala Manorama Co Ltd)
1. Radio Neythal 107.8 FM - Community Radio Station (Diocese of Alappuzha)
- Thiruvalla
1. Radio MACFAST 90.4 - Community Radio Station
- Changanassery
1. Radio Media Village 90.8 - Community Radio Station
- Kottayam
1. Radio Mangalam 91.2 - Community Radio Station
2. Radio Media Village 90.8 - Community Radio Station (St. Joseph College of Communication)
- Kochi
1. Club FM 94.3 (The Mathrubhumi Printing And Publishing Co Ltd)
2. Red FM 93.5 (Sun TV Network)
3. Radio Mango 91.9 (The Malayala Manorama Co Ltd.)
4. Radio Mirchi 104, Kochi (Indira Gandhi National Open University)
- Thrissur
1. Club FM 104.8 (The Mathrubhumi Printing And Publishing Co Ltd)
2. Radio Mango 91.9 (The Malayala Manorama Co Ltd)
3. BEST FM 95 (Asianet Communications)
4. Red FM 91.1 (Sun TV Network)
5. Hello Radio 90.8 - Community Radio Station
- Palakkad
1. Ahalia Voice 90.4 - Community Radio Station
- Kozhikode
1. Radio Mango 91.9 (The Malayala Manorama Co Ltd)
2. Red FM 93.5 (Sun TV Network)
3. Radio Mirchi 92.7 (Entertainment Network India Limited)
4. Club FM 94.3 (The Mathrubhumi Printing And Publishing Co Ltd)
- Wayanad
1. Radio Mattoli 90.4 - Community Radio Station (Wayanad Social Service Society)
- Kannur
1. Club FM 94.3 (The Mathrubhumi Printing And Publishing Co Ltd)
2. Radio Mango 91.9 (The Malayala Manorama Co Ltd)
3. Red FM 93.5 (Sun TV Network)
4. BEST FM 95 (Asianet Communications)

=== Private AM/FM/SW Stations outside Kerala ===
- Dubai
1. Asianet Radio 657AM (shut down)
2. Radio Asia 1269 AM (shut down)
3. Club FM 99.6 (The Mathrubhumi Group) (shut down)
4. Radio Me 95.3 FM (shut down)
5. Hit FM 96.7
6. Oxygen FM 102.4
7. Radio Mango 96.2 (shut down)
- Vatican
1. Vatican ShortWave Radio (SW 9505 kHz(31m)) daily at 8:40pm IST

=== Public sector Radio Channels ===
- All India Radio (AIR) FM Radio Stations in Kerala
1. Thiruvananthapuram -101.9
2. Kochi 102.3
3. Kochi FM Rainbow 107.5 (Music Channel)
4. Thrissur - 103
5. Devikulam - 101.4
6. Kozhikode - 103.6
7. Malappuram -102.7
8. Kannur - 101.5
- Akashvani (AIR) AM/MW Radio Stations in Kerala
1. Thiruvananthapuram - 1161
2. Alapuzha - 576
3. Thrissur - 630
4. Kozhikode - 684
5. Kavaratti - 1584
- Akashvani (AIR) SW Radio Stations in Kerala
1. Thiruvananthapuram - 5010,7290

== Internet ==
Internet service was started by ISPs like Kerala Telecommunication and VSNL in the year 1998. In the same year BPL, a private Mobile network operator introduced mobile telephony in Kerala. According to the IAMAI report, titled 'India Internet 2019', Kerala's Internet penetration rate is 54 % which is second highest in India

== Cinema ==
The history of Malayalam cinema begins with Vigathakumaran a silent film made by J. C. Daniel in 1928. The first Malayalam talkie, Balan, came out in 1938.

Udaya Studios, the first professional film studio of Kerala was set up in Alappuzha by Kunchako in 1947. Another landmark was the release of Chemmeen in 1966, directed by Ramu Kariat, which won the President's Gold Medal for the best Indian film.

The first co-operative society for film production, Chitralekha Film Co-operative was promoted by Chithralekha Film Society. This first film society of Kerala was started in 1964 by Adoor Gopalakrishnan and Kulathur Bhaskaran Nair.
