= Paramount+ =

American video streaming service

- Logo used since 2021

- Screenshot Paramount+ website on September 9, 2022
- Former names: CBS All Access (2014–2021); 10 All Access (Australia) (2018–2021)
- Website type: OTT streaming platform
- Available in: 8 languages
- List of languages: English (United Kingdom); English (United States); French (Canada); French (France); German; Italian; Portuguese (Brazil); Spanish (Latin America)
- Headquarters: New York City, U.S.
- Country of origin: United States
- Area served: As an independent streaming service: Australia, Austria, Brazil, Canada, (Note: It has a limited catalog) France, German-speaking Switzerland, Germany, Ireland, Italy, Spanish-speaking Latin America, United Kingdom, and United States (except for Puerto Rico); Through third-party distributors: Arab nations, (Note: As a content hub on BeIN Media Group) Baltics, (Note: As a content hub on Go3) Dutch-speaking Belgium, (Note: As a content hub on Streamz) Caribbean, (Note: As a content hub on FLOW and BTC) India, (Note: Some Paramount+ originals available through JioHotstar) French-speaking Switzerland, (Note: As a content hub on myCanal) Greece, (Note: As a content hub on Cosmote TV) Iran, Kazakhstan, (Note: As a content hub on Amediateka) New Zealand, (Note: Through TVNZ+, Sky Network Television, and Neon) South Korea, (Note: Some Paramount+ originals available through Coupang Play) Sub-Saharan Africa, (Note: As a content hub on MultiChoice) Thailand, (Note: Some Paramount+ originals available through Monomax) Turkey, (Note: Through TOD and beIN Connect) and Ukraine (Note: As a content hub on Megogo and 1+1 Video); Through SkyShowtime: Albania, Bosnia and Herzegovina, Bulgaria, Croatia, Czech Republic, Hungary, Kosovo, Montenegro, Netherlands, Nordics, (Note: Paramount+ was replaced by SkyShowtime on September 20, 2022.) North Macedonia, Poland, Portugal, Romania, Serbia, Slovakia, Slovenia, and Spain
- Owner: Skydance
- Industry: Entertainment; mass media
- Products: Streaming media; video on demand; digital distribution
- Services: Film production; film distribution; television production; television distribution
- Parent: Skydance Direct-to-Consumer
- Website: paramountplus.com
- IPv6 support: Yes
- Registration: Monthly/yearly subscription required to access content
- Users: ▲81.6 million (as of June 1, 2026)
- Launched: October 28, 2014; 12 years ago (as CBS All Access); March 4, 2021; 5 years ago (as Paramount+); June 27, 2023; 3 years ago (as Paramount+ with Showtime)
- Current status: Active

Paramount+ (also spelt "Paramount Plus") is an American subscription video on-demand over-the-top streaming service owned by the Direct-to-Consumer division of Skydance. The service's content is drawn primarily from the libraries of Paramount Pictures, CBS, Nickelodeon, MTV, Comedy Central, BET, the Smithsonian Channel and Showtime. It also shows original series and films, live streaming sports coverage, and in the United States, live streaming of local CBS television stations. Paramount+ was originally launched on October 28, 2014, by CBS Corporation as CBS All Access in the United States, initially focusing on the live streaming of CBS programming from its local affiliates, as well as on-demand access to CBS programs and library content. The service expanded into original programming in 2016. The service launched in Australia as 10 All Access in 2018, taking its name from Network 10, which was owned by CBS Corporation at the time, and consisted of a mixture between CBS and 10's programming. Paramount+ is one of the top ten most-subscribed video on demand streaming media services globally, with 81.6 million paid memberships. It is a sister service to HBO Max, which it is set to merge with to create a streaming platform with upwards of 200 million global subscribers.

Following the 2019 merger of CBS Corporation with Viacom, content from Comedy Central, MTV, Nickelodeon, and other Viacom brands was subsequently included, and in 2021, the service was renamed as Paramount+ on March 4, taking its name from Paramount Pictures, and was positioned as the flagship streaming venture of ViacomCBS (later known as Paramount Global), alongside Pluto TV and BET+. The service expanded into Australia, Latin America, and Europe.

Besides HBO Max, Paramount+ is also a sister service to Discovery+, which (along with HBO Max) became a part of Skydance following its 2026 acquisition of Warner Bros. Discovery; CBS News 24/7 and CBS Sports HQ, which are streaming services for CBS' news and sports divisions– and free ad-supported streaming television service Pluto TV, which was acquired by Viacom nine months before completing its merger with CBS. It was also a sister service to BET+, which was operated by BET and Tyler Perry Studios before being merged into Paramount+, and Noggin, a streaming service launched by Viacom in 2015 and based on the Noggin channel. Noggin was sold in 2024 and relaunched independently without Paramount programming.

== History ==
=== As CBS All Access ===
Logo as CBS All Access, used from October 28, 2014, to March 3, 2021

CBS All Access was launched on October 28, 2014, priced at US$5.99 per month with advertising and $9.99 per month without. Announced on October 16, 2014, as the first over-the-top (OTT) offering by an American broadcast television network, the service initially encompassed the network's existing streaming portal at CBS.com and its mobile app for smartphones and tablet computers; CBS All Access became available on Roku on April 7, 2015, and on Chromecast on May 14, 2015. In addition to providing full-length episodes of past and present CBS programs, the service allows live programming streams of local CBS affiliates in 194 markets reaching 92% of the United States (including stations owned by Sinclair Broadcast Group, Hearst Television, Tegna Media, Nexstar Media Group, Meredith Corporation, Griffin Media, Gray Television, Weigel Broadcasting, and Cox Media Group and the launch group of CBS Television Stations), including SEC sports and the NFL; however due to the absence of streaming rights, a few sports events are not streamed on the service (mainly involving PGA Tour events, some locally programmed NFL preseason games, and select brokered shows through CBS Sports Spectacular), along with limited syndicated and paid programming where only a local broadcast license to carry the program is allowed and web airing rights are retained by the syndicator or infomercial producer. By the very nature of its being live, streaming of a local affiliate does include all advertising, even with the commercial-free plan.

On December 1, 2016, CBS announced an agreement with the NFL to allow clearance of regional NFL games carried by CBS on CBS All Access from Week 13 of the 2016 NFL season on. At the time, the games were blacked out on non–Verizon Wireless mobile devices due to that provider's exclusivity agreement as the official wireless sponsor of the league. In the 2018 NFL season, a new agreement with Verizon ending that exclusivity began to allow CBS All Access to stream games to all mobile devices; Super Bowl games run on CBS All Access without the need for any authentication.

As of February 2017, the service had nearly 1.5 million subscribers. In August of the same year, CBS unveiled plans to expand CBS All Access to markets outside the United States. Canada was announced as the first international market to receive the service. Plans to launch in Australia quickly followed, resulting from CBS's purchase of free-to-air broadcaster Network 10.

In September 2017, Star Trek: Discovery premiered on CBS All Access, with its first episode also airing on the CBS broadcast network to promote the service. CBS reported that the premiere had driven its largest single-day increase in new subscribers since the Grammy Awards. Along with Star Trek, Big Brother 19 and the start of the 2017 NFL season had also driven major increases in growth that month.

Buoyed by Star Trek: Discovery, CBS All Access reached over 2 million subscribers by early 2018. The 60th Annual Grammy Awards also provided a boost to sign-ups, marking the second largest day for new subscriptions after the Discovery premiere. In April 2018, CBS All Access was made available outside the United States for the first time when it was launched in Canada.

The service launched in Australia in December 2018 as 10 All Access, named after Network 10. It operated alongside 10's free catch up and live streaming service 10 Play and contains a mixture of Network 10 and CBS programming. CBS shows are made available on All Access prior to being broadcast on 10's channels. 10 All Access is commercial-free and, unlike CBS All Access, has only one pricing tier.

In January 2019, CBS reported its largest increase in subscribers over a weekend—a 72% increase over the premiere of Discovery, crediting the premiere of season 2 of the series and that week's AFC Championship Game (which also brought the service its largest streaming audience for a football game). Super Bowl LIII would surpass this record only a few weeks later, with CBS reporting an 84% increase in new subscribers.

=== Re-merger of CBS and Viacom ===
On November 25, 2019, as part of the re-merger between CBS Corporation and Viacom, CBS All Access announced the inclusion of programming from Nickelodeon, as part of the wider launch of children's programming on the service, with other partners including Boat Rocker Studios and WildBrain.

In January 2020, CBS All Access became available on the Xfinity Flex platform, followed by the X1 platform in December.

On February 6, 2020, CNBC reported that ViacomCBS was in discussions to launch a larger premium streaming offering, combining CBS All Access with content from Paramount Pictures, the Domestic Media Networks division, and Pluto TV. The service would include an ad-free tier, and a premium tier that includes Showtime's streaming service. The company would maintain its existing streaming platforms, while marketing the new service to users of these other services. ViacomCBS partially outlined these plans in a corporate earnings call on February 20, 2020, stating that the expanded All Access service would take a "house of brands" approach to content and serve as a mid-tier offering complementing Pluto TV (which would remain a free service) and the Showtime OTT service by "adding a broad pay offering, built on All Access's foundation." The expanded service will include content from MTV, VH1, Nickelodeon, Comedy Central, BET, and Smithsonian Channel, as well as a library of 30,000 television series episodes and up to 1,000 film titles from Paramount's film and television divisions and CBS Media Ventures and expanded live news and sports offerings. No pricing plan or firm dates for content expansion were disclosed, though a "soft relaunch" will occur later in 2020. ViacomCBS will also continue to license its television and film content to competing streaming platforms.

On May 7, 2020, CBS All Access began adding more films to the service, starting with more than 100 from Paramount Pictures, and ViacomCBS announced that CBS All Access will expand internationally within twelve months. On July 30, 2020, CBS All Access added several shows from ViacomCBS Domestic Media Networks, introduced a new user interface with "hubs" for different brands, and revealed that Kamp Koral: SpongeBob's Under Years (previously planned to air on Nickelodeon) would debut on the service in 2021. With the expansion, it was also announced that the service would rebrand in early-2021 to separate itself from CBS's platforms, and that there were plans to add multiple user profiles and parental controls later in 2020.

=== Rebrand as Paramount+ ===
On September 15, 2020, it was announced that CBS All Access, along with 10 All Access would rebrand as Paramount+ in 2021, and that it planned to perform more international expansion under the new name.

On January 19, 2021, it was announced that Paramount+ would launch on March 4, 2021, with information being released on February 24, 2021, during an investor event. The company announced that no updates will be provided for apps on second or third generation Apple TV once the service relaunches. ViacomCBS announced during their investor event on February 24 that Paramount+ would premiere new 2021 theatrical releases from Paramount Pictures (such as A Quiet Place Part II and Snake Eyes) 45 days after their theatrical release, PAW Patrol: The Movie and Clifford the Big Red Dog received simultaneous theatrical and Paramount+ releases on August 20 and November 10, 2021 respectively, while other future theatrical releases from Paramount would premiere on the service either after their theatrical run or after their run on Epix (which reached a new deal with ViacomCBS that same day to provide content for Paramount+, allowing recent releases from Paramount to be available on the service among other titles).

The relaunch occurred as announced on March 4, 2021, with additional streaming content being launched and further rebranding efforts taking place at that time. In August 2021, it was announced that Paramount+ would be shut down in Nordic Europe in 2022 in favor of SkyShowtime, a joint venture with Comcast-owned Sky Group that would also include content from Showtime, Sky Studios, and NBCUniversal.

In September 2021, it was announced that Showtime's direct-to-consumer service would be offered as part of a bundle with Paramount+. Showtime content would still be accessed via the Showtime app and website, but plans were announced for Showtime content to be accessible within the Paramount+ apps for its DTC subscribers later in 2022. The change was implemented in August 2022, with subscribers on both services able to upgrade to the combined "Paramount+ with Showtime" service for $11.99 per-month with ads and $14.99 without; a discount for new subscribers was available as an introductory offer through October 2.

On August 15, 2022, Walmart reached an exclusive deal with Paramount+ to offer the streaming service as part of its Walmart+ offering. It meant that Walmart+ customers could access the ad-supported plan on Paramount+ at no additional charge. Qantas also announced it had partnered with Paramount ANZ to offer Paramount+ on its in-flight entertainment systems.

On June 27, 2023, Showtime's direct-to-consumer service in the United States was fully integrated with the advertising-free premium tier of Paramount+, replacing the aforementioned bundle first introduced in 2021. The newly renamed "Paramount+ with Showtime" premium tier was raised from $9.99 to $11.99 per month while the "Essential" plan (containing advertising and no Showtime content) was raised from $4.99 to $5.99 per month. The Showtime Anytime app was discontinued on December 14, 2023. That same month on December 6, Paramount announced that the apps for Nickelodeon, Nick Jr., MTV, Comedy Central, Paramount Network, and Showtime would be discontinued soon. The apps were discontinued on January 31, 2024, although this did not include CBS' app. The reason was to encourage more users to sign up for Paramount+. Paramount+’s sister streaming service Noggin was shut down on July 2, 2024 for the same reason. Noggin originally ceased operations as a television service on September 28, 2009, in favor of the Nick Jr. Channel.

=== Merger of Skydance Media and Paramount Global ===
After some setbacks, Paramount Global and Skydance Media received FCC approval to merge on July 24, 2025, which became effective on August 7 of that year. Prior to the creation of the new conglomerate, it was reported that Oracle Corporation would help merge the operations of Paramount+ with its sister platform Pluto TV. Following the formation of the new company legally known as Paramount Skydance Corporation, a restructuring was created where Tom Ryan, president of Paramount Streaming (parent company of Paramount+), would report to Cindy Holland, president of the new Paramount Skydance Direct-to-consumer division.

On August 11, 2025, it was announced that Paramount had acquired the exclusive American broadcast rights to the UFC (Ultimate Fighting Championship) for an estimated $7.7 billion over seven years. Under the deal, Paramount+ will become the exclusive streamer of all UFC events beginning in 2026, with CBS airing select events. On October 28, it was announced that Paramount had also acquired the exclusive Latin America broadcast rights to the UFC, as well as the rights for Fight Night events and preliminary cards for the mainline "numbered" events in Australia; the main card rights for these events are currently held by Foxtel in the country.

On August 13, 2025, David Ellison (CEO of Paramount Skydance) indicated that a "soft merger" of the company's two platforms (Paramount+ and Pluto TV), unifying their technological infrastructure but maintaining distinct front-end identities, could occur within the next 12 to 18 months, meaning the merger would be completed by November 2026.

=== Merger of Paramount Skydance and Warner Bros. Discovery ===
A few months following its formation, Paramount Skydance began making numerous bids to acquire Warner Bros. Discovery (WBD). During the bidding process, it was reported that Paramount was interested in merging Paramount+ with WBD's flagship streaming service HBO Max to create a flagship streaming platform for the combined company.

Following a lengthy bidding war against Netflix, Paramount increased its offer for WBD, prompting Netflix to exit the bidding war and allowing Paramount to proceed as the winning bidder.

Following the announcement of the merger, Paramount formally announced that it would merge Paramount+ and HBO Max into one streaming service, with which it aimed to reach more than 200 million streaming subscribers.

On April 23, 2026, WBD's shareholders approved the sale to Paramount Skydance.

The pre-trial press conference would be on February 24, 2027, as the Paramount & Warner Bros. trial was scheduled to take place from March 2 to 19, 2027.

On June 12, 2026, the sale was approved by the U.S. Department of Justice. In July 2026, California and 11 other U.S. states, as well as the Writers Guild of America, filed antitrust lawsuits to delay the consummation of the purchase, arguing that the combined company's share of box office and cable television revenue post-acquisition would give it undue leverage over film exhibitors and television providers. On September 21, 2026, Paramount announced a proposed out-of-court settlement, subject to a five-year consent decree mandating specific investments towards film production and acquisition, restrictions on its engagement with film exhibitors and television providers, and the establishment of an independent board to oversee the editorial integrity and independence of CBS News and CNN post-acquisition, among other conditions. The court delayed its approval in order to allow amicus briefs by parties opposed to the settlement, who argued that its antitrust remedies were not strong enough to address the original concerns raised in the suit; the settlement was approved on September 30, 2026, with Paramount stating that it expected to complete the acquisition by October 6, 2026. The merger closed as planned on that date.

== Geographical expansion ==
In the United Kingdom and Ireland, the service launched on June 21, 2022, one day earlier than planned, and is available to watch on the Amazon Prime Video platform and as a standalone app. Subscribers to Sky Cinema received access to the service as part of their subscription, however in January 2025 the offering was shifted from the ad-free to the ad-supported subscription.

An announcement about the launch of Paramount+ in Italy, France, Germany, Switzerland and Austria in the second half of the year was made in early 2022. in late 2022, Paramount+ announced that the streaming service will be launched in France and French-speaking Switzerland on December 1, followed by its arrival in Germany, Austria, and German-speaking Switzerland on December 8.

In September 2022, Paramount+ was replaced in the Nordics by SkyShowtime, a joint venture with Comcast that also includes Sky Studios and NBCUniversal content. SkyShowtime was subsequently launched throughout many other European countries over the course of late 2022 and early 2023, not including territories where Sky operates as a pay-TV provider or France.

The service launched in South Korea on June 16, 2022, on the TVING video streaming platform operated by the entertainment company CJ ENM. TVING subscribers could stream Paramount+ content at no additional charge, but the Paramount+ hub on TVING in South Korea ended after June 18, 2024.

In Japan, the service launched on November 15, 2023, on the on-demand platforms of cable provider JCOM and satellite broadcaster Wowow at no additional cost to subscribers. It later expanded as a paid add-on channel to Prime Video on April 17, 2024, and to Lemino, operated by Japan's largest telecom NTT Docomo, on April 18, 2025. On February 18, 2026, it was announced that Paramount+ would cease all services in Japan on March 31 of the same year.

== Subscribers ==
| Subscribers | As of | Ref |
|---|---|---|
| Over 100,000 | January 2015 | |
| Around 1.2 million | December 2016 | |
| Nearly 1.5 million | February 2017 | |
| Over 2 million | March 2018 | |
| 2.5 million | August 2018 | |
| 4 million | February 2019 | |
| Around 8 million | December 2020 | |
| 32.8 million | December 2021 | |
| 39.6 million | March 2022 | |
| 43.3 million | June 2022 | |
| 46 million | September 2022 | |
| 55.9 million | December 2022 | |
| 60 million | March 2023 | |
| 60.7 million | June 2023 | |
| 63.4 million | September 2023 | |
| 67.5 million | December 2023 | |
| 71.2 million | March 2024 | |
| 79 million | March 2025 | |

View source data.

In 2021, ViacomCBS issued a press release that revealed the combined number of subscribers to both CBS All Access and Showtime (another streaming product). That press release revealed that the two streaming services had a combined 19.2 million US subscribers, though the release did not provide individual numbers for either service. In May, ViacomCBS reported to have gained 6 million subscribers during the first quarter. This brought the total number of global subscribers for ViacomCBS streaming platforms (Paramount+, Showtime, BET+) to 36 million. Out of the 36 million subscribers, a majority of these subscribers are subscribed to Paramount+; however, the exact number of subscribers were not released.

On February 15, 2022, Paramount announced that 32.8 million subscribers have signed up for Paramount+ as of the end of 2021. This number increased to 39.6 million as of late March and reached to 43.4 million by September.

According to the Wall Street Journal, Paramount plans to raise subscription prices for Paramount+ in the United States in early 2026.

== Programming ==
=== Original programming ===
In November 2015, it was announced that CBS All Access would expand into original programming, announcing plans for a new Star Trek television series produced by Alex Kurtzman to premiere in 2017. The series would be the first television series in the franchise since Star Trek: Enterprise (which ran from 2001 to 2005 on former corporate sibling UPN). The series was later announced as Star Trek: Discovery.

In May 2016, it was announced that The Good Wife would get a spin-off featuring Christine Baranski's character Diane Lockhart; The Good Fight launched with a CBS broadcast premiere in February 2017, with the remaining nine episodes exclusive to CBS All Access. This became the first original drama on the platform, ahead of the delayed launch of Star Trek: Discovery . In August 2016, it was announced that a streaming spin-off season of CBS reality series Big Brother was being planned for CBS All Access. The season, Big Brother: Over the Top, premiered in September 2016.

Further Star Trek television series were announced for CBS All Access as well: in February 2019, CBS All Access announced what would become Star Trek: Picard, focusing on the Star Trek: The Next Generation series' captain, which premiered in January 2020. The adult animation series Star Trek: Lower Decks premiered in August 2020.

With the service's rebranding as Paramount+, The SpongeBob Movie: Sponge on the Run and spin-off series Kamp Koral: SpongeBob's Under Years debuted in March 2021. Sponge on the Run was also made available to rent on demand on the same day. ViacomCBS announced planned original series such as the true crime series The Real Criminal Minds, a revival of Behind the Music, a revival of the BET series The Game, Taylor Sheridan's Lioness, and The Offer—a drama based on Albert S. Ruddy's experiences filming The Godfather. It later announced plans to produce continuations, revivals, and reboots of other properties, including Frasier, iCarly, Reno 911!, and a series adaptation of Flashdance, among others.

In February 2021, Paramount+ announced a television adaptation of the Xbox Game Studios franchise Halo produced by Amblin Television and Showtime, set to premiere in 2022. The show had been moved from Showtime's slate, as ViacomCBS positions the network as a premium "adult" service (as opposed to the broader positioning of Paramount+).

In May 2021, CBS announced that Evil and SEAL Team would move from CBS to Paramount+ beginning with their second and fifth seasons, respectively.

In August 2021, as part of the renewal of Comedy Central animated series South Park through 2027, it was announced that series creators Trey Parker and Matt Stone would produce 14 movie-length South Park specials for Paramount+, with two premiering annually from 2021 through 2027. Streaming rights to the South Park series proper are owned by Max through 2025, after which streaming rights for new episodes will move to Paramount+ beginning in 2024 (season 27), and the series library in 2025.

In May 2022, Paramount announced that Paramount+ was planned to commission 150 international originals by 2025, including several from Latin America (mainly Mexico) and European territories (including France, Italy, and Spain).

In July 2025, Paramount announced that they had signed a $1.5 billion deal with South Park creators Trey Parker and Matt Stone, to bring the show exclusively to its streaming platform Paramount+ after a drawn-out bidding war with rivals including HBO Max and Netflix.

=== Sports programming ===
Paramount+ also carries sports programming, in conjunction with CBS Sports. In November 2019, CBS announced that it had acquired streaming rights in the United States to the UEFA Champions League and Europa League in European soccer, replacing Turner Sports. All matches will stream on the service, with selected matches on the broadcast network and CBS Sports Network. The contract was initially to begin in the 2021–22 season and last through 2023–24. However, during a suspension of the 2019–20 season due to the COVID-19 pandemic in Europe, existing rightsholder Turner Sports opted out of its contract, and CBS took over the rights early for its remaining seasons. On August 19, 2022, UEFA extended the deal until 2030.

The service has picked up other domestic and international soccer events as well, including the National Women's Soccer League (NWSL), CONCACAF Nations League, Women's Nations League, and 2022 CONCACAF Women's Championship, the Argentine Primera División, Brazilian Série A, and Italy's Serie A. As part of the NFL's rights renewal with CBS, Paramount+ gains expanded rights to stream games on both its premium and ad-supported tiers between 2021 and 2033.

On January 27, 2022, it was announced that the platform would broadcast all the matches of the Chile national team as well as the rest of the qualifying games (with the exception of the home games of the Brazil and Bolivia national teams) towards the 2026 World Cup. which would begin in 2023, sharing broadcasts with Pluto TV and the free-to-air television channel Chilevisión. Paramount+ has also acquired exclusive rights in Mexico, Central America, Belize and Dominican Republic for the Premier League starting in the 2022/2023 season, and began carrying rights in Brazil to air Copa Libertadores and Copa Sudamericana with the 2023 seasons for their respective football cups.

On May 22, 2025, it was announced that World Rugby had secured an exclusive, multi-year, multi-platform rights agreement with CBS Sports for Paramount+ to become the American home for all men's and women's World Rugby events through 2029, including the next three Rugby World Cups and all USA national team matches.

==== Current broadcasting rights ====
| Event | Broadcast partner(s) | Dates | Region | Notes |
American football
| National Football League | CBS | 2016– | United States | Sunday afternoon games from American Football Conference including the championship games, divisional playoff games, wild card games, and several Super Bowls. |
| College Football on CBS Sports | CBS | 2021– | United States | Big Ten Conference, Army-Navy Game, Sun Bowl |
American basketball
| NCAA Division I men's basketball tournament | CBS | 2021– | United States | March Madness streamed |
| Big3 Basketball | CBS | 2019– | United States | |
Cricket
| Indian Premier League | Sports18 | 2023– | India, New Zealand, South Africa, United Kingdom | Streaming rights |
Golf
| The Masters | CBS | 2021– | United States | |
| PGA Championship | CBS | 2021– | United States | |
| PGA Tour | CBS | 2021– | United States | |
MMA
| Ultimate Fighting Championship | CBS | 2026–2033 | United States, Canada, Latin America, Australia | Mainline ("numbered") UFC events and UFC Fight Night events in the United States and Latin America, UFC Fight Night events and the preliminary cards for numbered events in Australia. All UFC events stream on Paramount+ at no additional cost. |
Boxing
| Zuffa Boxing | CBS | 2026–2031 | United States, Canada, Latin America, Australia | 12 boxing events a year. The bouts will be available via Paramount+, with the potential for select events to be simulcast on CBS. |
Rugby Union
| Rugby World Cup | CBS | 2025–2029 | United States | Every match live |
| Women's Rugby World Cup | CBS | 2025–2029 | United States | Every match live |
| USA Men's National Team | CBS | 2025–2029 | United States | Every match live |
| USA Women's National Team | CBS | 2025–2029 | United States | Every match live |
| World Rugby Under 20 Championship | CBS | 2025–2029 | United States | Every match live |
| HSBC SVNS | CBS | 2025–2029 | United States | Every match live |
| WXV Women's Tournament | CBS | 2025–2029 | United States | Every match live |
| Pacific Nations Cup | CBS | 2025–2029 | United States | Every match live |
| Pacific Four Series | CBS | 2025–2029 | United States | Every match live |
Soccer
| UEFA Champions League | CBS | 2020– | United States | Every match live, select matches also aired on CBS |
| UEFA Super Cup | CBS Sports Network | 2020– | United States | Every match live |
| UEFA Europa League | CBS Sports Network | 2020– | United States | Every match live |
| UEFA Europa Conference League | | 2021– | United States | Every match live |
| National Women's Soccer League | CBS Sports Network | 2020– | United States | Most games streamed. All others aired on CBS Sports Network. Rights to most matches (except those matches streamed exclusively on Twitch.) |
| FA Women's Super League | CBS Sports Network | 2022– | United States | Most matches streamed. Selected matches aired on CBS Sports Network. 57 matches per season (same matches as those aired in the UK by BBC and Sky Sports.) |
| CONCACAF | CBS Sports Network | 2021– | United States | More than 200 CONCACAF national team matches live, including at least 80 CONCACAF Women's World Cup Qualifying matches and more than 100 CONCACAF Women's Nations League contests |
| Serie A | CBS Sports Network | 2021- | United States, Brazil | All 380 matches streamed |
| Coppa Italia | CBS Sports Network | 2021- | United States, Brazil | 25 matches streamed including selected knockout rounds, and the Supercoppa Italiana match each year between the winners of Serie A and Coppa Italia. |
| Argentine Primera División | CBS Sports Network | 2021- | United States | All matches streamed |
| Campeonato Brasileiro Série A | CBS Sports Network | 2021- | United States | All 380 matches streamed |
| Scottish Premiership | CBS Sports Network | 2021- | United States | All 228 matches streamed |
| Scottish Championship | CBS Sports Network | 2021- | United States | Streaming rights |
| Scottish League Cup | CBS Sports Network | 2021- | United States | Streaming rights |
| A-League Men | Network 10 | 2021– | Australia | Every match live |
| A-League Women | Network 10 | 2021– | Australia | Every match live |
| Socceroos Internationals | Network 10 | 2021– | Australia | |
| Matildas Internationals | Network 10 | 2021– | Australia | |
| Australia Cup | Network 10 | 2021– | Australia | Games from Round 32 onwards, including the Round of 16, Quarter Finals, Semi-Finals and the Australia Cup Final |
| U23 Men's Friendly Internationals | Network 10 | 2021– | Australia | Home Games |
| Socceroos FIFA World Cup Asian Qualifier | Network 10 | 2021– | Australia | All matches |
| AFC Asian Cup | Network 10 | 2021– | Australia, United States, Canada, Bermuda | Finals Only |
| 2022 AFC Women's Asian Cup | Network 10 | 2021– | Australia, United States, Canada, Bermuda | Finals Only |
| AFC U-23 Asian Cup | Network 10 | 2021– | Australia, United States, Canada, Bermuda | Finals Only 2022 & 2024 |
| AFC U-20 Asian Cup | Network 10 | 2021– | Australia, United States, Canada, Bermuda | Finals Only 2023 |
| AFC U-17 Asian Cup | Network 10 | 2021– | Australia, United States, Canada, Bermuda | Finals Only 2023 |
| AFC U-20 Women's Asian Cup | Network 10 | 2021– | Australia, United States, Canada, Bermuda | Finals Only 2022 & 2024 |
| AFC U-17 Women's Asian Cup | Network 10 | 2021– | Australia, United States, Canada, Bermuda | Finals Only 2022 & 2024 |
| AFC Futsal Asian Cup | Network 10 | 2021– | Australia, United States, Canada, Bermuda | Finals Only 2022 & 2024 |
| Olympic Qualifying Tournament | Network 10 | 2021– | Australia | AFC Women's Olympic Qualifying Tournament (Final Round) for Paris Olympics 2024 |
| AFC Champions League Elite | | 2021– | Australia | All matches |
| AFC Champions League Two | | 2023– | Australia | All matches |
| Premier League | CBS | 2022– | Mexico (exclusive), Central America (exclusive), Dominican Republic (exclusive in Spanish, shared with English-language rightsholder in the Caribbean), Belize (exclusive in Spanish, shared with English-language rightsholder in the Caribbean) | All 380 matches streamed. Streaming rights exclusively in Dominican Republic and Belize. |
| Copa Libertadores and Copa Sudamericana | | 2023– | Brazil | |
| Supercoppa Italiana | | 2024– | Brazil | |
| Women's Serie A, Women's Coppa Italia, Women's Supercoppa Italiana | | 2024– | Brazil | |
| K League 1, Korean FA Cup | | 2024– | Brazil | |
| Saudi Pro League, Saudi King's Cup, Saudi Super Cup | | 2024– | Brazil | |
| Copa do Nordeste | SBT | 2024– | Brazil | |
| Copa América | Grupo Globo | 2024– | Brazil | |
| Qatar Stars League | | 2024– | Brazil | |
World Games
| 2022 World Games | CBS | 2022 | United States | One hour highlights package each day streamed |

=== Syndicated and archived programming ===
The most recent episodes of CBS's shows are usually made available on CBS.com and Paramount+ the day after their original broadcast.

Paramount+ provides complete back catalogs of most of its current series, including full-season "stacking rights" (with the exception of certain series, such as The Big Bang Theory, which CBS held only "last five" episode rights during its original run, as Warner Bros. retains all other rights as the show's distributor), as well as a wide selection of episodes of classic series from the CBS Media Ventures program library – including shows previously owned by the original Paramount Television made for both CBS and other networks prior to CBS's acquisition of its program library through the CBS-Viacom split (including the complete episode catalog of shows like Star Trek, Cheers, MacGyver, Twin Peaks, and CSI: Miami), along with the pre-1973 NBC and ABC libraries to subscribers of the service. Paramount+ also carries behind-the-scenes features from CBS programs and special events, and (beginning with the 17th season in June 2015) live feeds and special content from the reality series Big Brother. However, with Warner Bros. licensing its content from its television and film library (even including a few HBO series) to Paramount+ in select regions like Australia, The Big Bang Theory would soon be made available for streaming on Paramount+.

In mid-April 2017, a limited library of films, made up of content from Paramount Pictures, Metro-Goldwyn-Mayer (MGM), Sony Pictures, The Samuel Goldwyn Company, and CBS Films, was made available on the service. This includes several titles in the Star Trek film series. On May 7, 2020, CBS All Access added more than 100 films from Paramount Pictures; more films were added in the following months.

In August 2019, CBS All Access expanded into children's broadcasting by acquiring the American broadcast rights to Danger Mouse (1981) (as well as the reboot of the series), Cloudy with a Chance of Meatballs, and several other series from WildBrain including Inspector Gadget (and Inspector Gadget's Field Trip), Bob the Builder (original, and reboot), Polly Pocket and others. On July 30, 2020, CBS All Access added 56 shows from ViacomCBS Domestic Media Networks.

On February 15, 2022, it was announced that Paramount+ would be the new streaming home for South Park in the United States beginning with season 27 in 2024, after HBO Max's deal to the show will expire in 2025 in the United States and its separate international deal with Netflix has also expired in 2022, with all current seasons of South Park rolling out onto the service in countries where it is available, with new episodes premiering on Paramount+ in those regions. This comes just seven months after the show's creators Trey Parker and Matt Stone extending their deals with Paramount Global in August 2021; the streaming acquisition of the series will also include the rights to all 310 episodes beginning in 2022 in other countries and in 2025 in the United States.

CBS's Christmas specials are not available on Paramount+.

== Launch ==
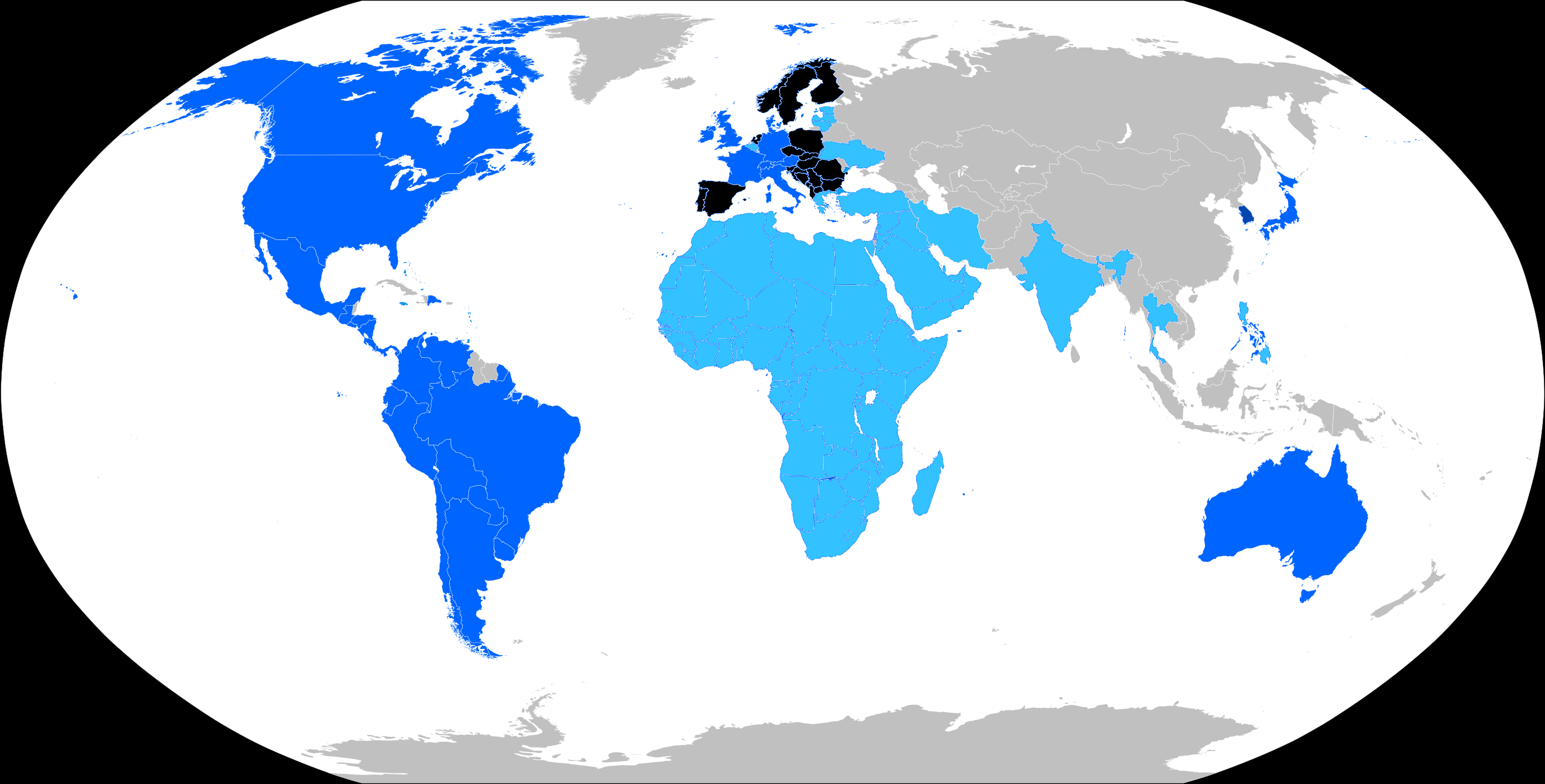
Availability of Paramount+, as of 9 June 2025: Available Confirmed launch Third-party distribution SkyShowtime

CBS All Access was first launched in the United States on October 27, 2014. The service would receive its first International expansion on April 23, 2018, when CBS All Access expanded to Canada. Australia received its own version of the service, named 10 All Access, on December 4, 2018.

In August 2020, ViacomCBS announced plans to launch an expanded international streaming service using the CBS All Access technical architecture, but under the new Paramount+ name (revealed in September) in 2021; the Paramount+ name would also be applied to the American replacement to CBS All Access. The service features original programming from CBS All Access as well as Showtime, plus additional programming including Paramount Pictures films which may vary by market. The service would initially launch in the Nordics and Latin America, replacing an existing service of the same name, with additional markets to follow. In Australia, while the relaunched service will premiere all new Showtime original programs going forward, currently airing series will remain on Stan until their conclusion under an existing deal.

The Paramount+ brand itself was originated as a subscription video on demand film service, first launching in the Nordics in 2017, and then in Hungary, Latin America, and Russia in the following three years. The current iteration of Paramount+ in the Nordics and Latin America was preceded by this service.

Outside the United States, Paramount+ is currently available in Australia, Canada, Germany, Italy, Latin America, Middle East (as a pay TV channel), the United Kingdom and Ireland. Additionally, the Paramount+ SVOD service is still active in Russia (as Okko Paramount+ and IVI Paramount Play), though the current streaming service is unavailable in said regions. Due to program rights and existing content deals, several programs are not available on local versions, or have delayed availability for new episodes. For example, Star Trek: Discovery and all others from the franchise are licensed to Bell Media in Canada for their CTV Sci-Fi (in English) and Z (in French) channels and streaming service Crave. As another example, selected Paramount+ original kids and family programming such as Kamp Koral: SpongeBob's Under Years and Rugrats are licensed to Corus Entertainment for their YTV and Treehouse networks and Nick+ streaming service in 2021, in part due to pre-existing agreements between Corus and Paramount Global. Star Trek: Prodigy is currently the only show of the genre not to be available on either Corus services or Paramount+. Instead, it airs in Canada on the CTV Sci-Fi Channel.

A localized version of Paramount+ operates in the Middle East as a premium offering on pay-TV provider OSN, replacing the now-defunct Paramount Channel. It features content from the aforementioned channel, as well as Nickelodeon, Comedy Central and MTV.

In India, Paramount+ original programming, along with Showtime and CBS programming were made available under Voot Select in Viacom18's Voot, a joint venture between Paramount Global and Network 18, beginning in early 2021.

In August 2021, Comcast announced an agreement with Paramount Global to launch SkyShowtime, a joint streaming service combining programming from the Paramount Global, Sky, and NBCUniversal libraries as well as original programming from Peacock and Paramount+. The service is expected to be available in 20 smaller European territories, including four Nordic countries along with Hungary where it will replace Paramount+ and Poland where it will replace Paramount Play, instead of Paramount+ and Peacock operating separately in those markets.

In November 2021, it was announced that Star Trek: Discovery would be pulled from Netflix in all countries outside the United States and Canada (for which Bell Media retained the license for the entire Star Trek libraries) and moved to Paramount+ for international release. Also reported were plans for its 2022 global rollout, starting with its launch in the United Kingdom, Ireland, Italy, Germany, German-speaking Switzerland and Austria via Sky Group and South Korean entertainment and media conglomerate CJ ENM to launch Paramount+ as a content hub on TVING (similar to Disney+'s Star), marking the first Asian region to launch the streaming platform; the partnership also includes a joint venture for future content, including English adaptations of tvN drama series which has produced by CJ's production house Studio Dragon. During the earning call on May 3, 2022, it was announced that Paramount+ was set to be launched in the United Kingdom and Ireland on June 22, 2022, while the South Korean content hub launch was on June 16, 2022. Paramount also announced that Paramount+ would launch in India from Viacom18 in 2023. It is yet to be announced on whether it will replace Voot along with JioCinema. The service as a content hub on TVING in South Korea was ended after two years in June 2024.

On February 15, 2022, during its annual investor presentation, French media conglomerate and cable operator Canal+ Group announced that Paramount+ will be launching in France in December of that year, followed by the announcement that the streamer will also expand into the Caribbean by the end of the second quarter of that year.

On March 28, 2022, Caribbean cable operators FLOW and BTC announced that Paramount+ will be launching in the Caribbean via the cable companies' video on demand platforms. Within the region's subset covered by those VOD platforms, at least one such country was seemingly omitted from the initial rollout; however, some months later Jamaica was also added.

On November 27, 2022, the director of the Swiss branch of Canal+ Group announced that Paramount+ will be launching in French-speaking Switzerland on December 1, 2022.

Meanwhile, Paramount+ was released in other territories in Europe as SkyShowtime, beginning with replacing Paramount+ in the Nordics on September 20, 2022, launching in October 25 of same year, in the Netherlands and Portugal, afterwards in the former Yugoslav countries (except North Macedonia) on December 14 of that same year, and on February 14, 2023, in the rest of Central and Eastern Europe. SkyShowtime finished its expansion by releasing in Spain and Andorra on February 28, 2023, with its content later being incorporated as part of more expensive packages in the Spanish TV operator Movistar Plus+ at the beginning of 2024.

Paramount+ had originally announced intentions of launching in Southeast Asia, Taiwan, Hong Kong, Africa, and the MENA in 2023, but after the end of SkyShowtime's expansion in early 2023, the majority of these plans seem to have been scaled back or postponed, with Paramount Global opting to make Paramount+ available in new regions through partnerships with existing pay TV operators instead of expanding the reach of the standalone streaming platform.

In Belgium some titles from Paramount+ were made available exclusively on Streamz in 2022. In November 2023, the deal with Paramount & Streamz was expanded so that a large part of the Paramount+ catalog would gradually become available on Streamz from December 22, 2023.

Paramount+ was launched in Japan on December 6, 2023, as an additional VOD hub for Japanese operators J:COM and Wowow via their respective VOD services. The hub was also made available on Amazon Prime Video and Lemino in 2024 and 2025 respectively. However, following an announcement on February 18, 2026, citing circumstances of the rights holder, the service officially ended across all four local platforms on March 31, 2026. Similar plans were announced for Greece, in this case via the Greek cable operator Cosmote TV, with Paramount+ content becoming available on April 22, 2024, across the Cosmote Cinema channels and on demand.

A deal was eventually signed for distribution of Paramount+ in the MENA with beIN Media Group on October 22, 2024, with Paramount+ content now being present in the beIN's television channels, like beIN Series. This deal was also expanded into beIN's operations in Turkey on February 25, 2025.

Additionally, Paramount+ was also announced for the Philippines as a content hub on TAP DMV's OTT platform Blast TV which was launched on May 23, 2025, and relaunched in South Korea under the new partnership with Coupang Play in 2025.

On January 27, 2026, Paramount Skydance signed an exclusive content distribution agreement with New Zealand satellite television company Sky Network Television to distribute content from its assets including Paramount+ via its television channels and Neon streaming service.

On June 5, 2026, TAP DMV's Blast TV discontinued Paramount+ from its content hub, a year after its launch. This was due to its expiration of contract with Paramount Global Content Distribution.

| Release date | Country/territory | Status | Release partner(s) |
|---|---|---|---|
| October 28, 2014 (Note: As CBS All Access) March 4, 2021 (Note: Rebranded as Paramount+) | United States | Available | T-Mobile, Walmart |
| April 23, 2018 March 4, 2021 | Canada | Available | None (Note: Some of its programs are also aired on Bell Media and Corus Entertainment channels.) |
| December 4, 2018 (Note: As 10 All Access) August 11, 2021 | Australia | Available | Network 10 |
| March 4, 2021 (Note: Preceded by the SVOD service of the same name) | Argentina | Available | Telefe |
| March 4, 2021 | Bolivia | Available | None |
| March 4, 2021 | Brazil | Available | None |
| March 4, 2021 | Chile | Available | Chilevisión (Note: Partnership since October 2021 following its acquisition from WarnerMedia Latin America (now Warner Bros. Discovery Americas)) |
| March 4, 2021 | Colombia | Available | None |
| March 4, 2021 | Costa Rica | Available | None |
| March 4, 2021 | Dominican Republic | Available | None |
| March 4, 2021 | Ecuador | Available | None |
| March 4, 2021 | El Salvador | Available | None |
| March 4, 2021 | Guatemala | Available | None |
| March 4, 2021 | Honduras | Available | None |
| March 4, 2021 | Mexico | Available | None |
| March 4, 2021 | Nicaragua | Available | None |
| March 4, 2021 | Panama | Available | None |
| March 4, 2021 | Paraguay | Available | None |
| March 4, 2021 | Peru | Available | None |
| March 4, 2021 | Uruguay | Available | None |
| March 4, 2021 | Venezuela | Available | None |
| March 25, 2021 | Denmark | Available | SkyShowtime |
| March 25, 2021 | Finland | Available | SkyShowtime |
| March 25, 2021 | Norway | Available | SkyShowtime |
| March 25, 2021 | Sweden | Available | SkyShowtime |
| June 1, 2020–2024 June 1, 2021–2025 | Russia | Discontinued | Okko IVI |
| July 1, 2021 | Ukraine | Available | Megogo, 1+1 Video, Kyivstar TV |
| December 1, 2021 | Estonia | Available | Go3 (limited catalog) |
| December 1, 2021 | Latvia | Available | Go3 (limited catalog) |
| December 1, 2021 | Lithuania | Available | Go3 (limited catalog) |
| March 28, 2022 | Anguilla | Available | FLOW |
| March 28, 2022 | Antigua and Barbuda | Available | FLOW |
| March 28, 2022 | Bahamas | Available | BTC |
| March 28, 2022 | Barbados | Available | FLOW |
| March 28, 2022 | British Virgin Islands | Available | FLOW |
| March 28, 2022 | Cayman Islands | Available | FLOW |
| March 28, 2022 | Curaçao | Available | FLOW |
| March 28, 2022 | Dominica | Available | FLOW |
| March 28, 2022 | Grenada | Available | FLOW |
| March 28, 2022 | Saint Kitts and Nevis | Available | FLOW |
| March 28, 2022 | Turks and Caicos Islands | Available | FLOW |
| March 28, 2022 | Trinidad and Tobago | Available | FLOW |
| June 16, 2022–June 18, 2024 | South Korea | Discontinued | TVING |
| November 21, 2025 | South Korea | Available | Coupang Play |
| June 21, 2022 | Ireland | Available | Sky, Channel 5 |
| June 21, 2022 | United Kingdom | Available | Sky, Channel 5 |
| August 26, 2022 | Jamaica | Available | FLOW |
| September 15, 2022 | Italy | Available | Sky |
| October 25, 2022 | Netherlands | Available | SkyShowtime |
| October 25, 2022 | Portugal | Available | SkyShowtime |
| December 1, 2022 | France | Available | Canal+, Orange S.A. |
| December 1, 2022 | French-speaking Switzerland | Available | Canal+ |
| December 8, 2022 | Austria | Available | Sky |
| December 8, 2022 | Germany | Available | Sky |
| December 8, 2022 | German-speaking Switzerland | Available | Sky |
| December 14, 2022 | Bosnia and Herzegovina | Available | SkyShowtime |
| December 14, 2022 | Bulgaria | Available | SkyShowtime |
| December 14, 2022 | Croatia | Available | SkyShowtime |
| December 14, 2022 | Montenegro | Available | SkyShowtime |
| December 14, 2022 | Serbia | Available | SkyShowtime |
| December 14, 2022 | Slovenia | Available | SkyShowtime |
| February 14, 2023 | Bosnia and Herzegovina | Available | SkyShowtime |
| February 14, 2023 | Czech Republic | Available | SkyShowtime |
| February 14, 2023 | Hungary | Available | SkyShowtime |
| February 14, 2023 | North Macedonia | Available | SkyShowtime |
| February 14, 2023 | Kosovo | Available | SkyShowtime |
| February 14, 2023 | Poland | Available | SkyShowtime |
| February 14, 2023 | Romania | Available | SkyShowtime |
| February 14, 2023 | Slovakia | Available | SkyShowtime |
| February 28, 2023 | Andorra | Available | SkyShowtime |
| February 28, 2023 | Spain | Available | SkyShowtime, Movistar Plus+ |
| December 6, 2023–March 31, 2026 | Japan | Discontinued | Wowow, JCOM, Amazon Japan, (Note: Prime Video Channels launched on April 17, 2024.) Lemino |
| December 22, 2023 | Belgium (Flanders) | Available | Streamz |
| February 26, 2024 | Angola | Available | MultiChoice |
| February 26, 2024 | Benin | Available | MultiChoice |
| February 26, 2024 | Botswana | Available | MultiChoice |
| February 26, 2024 | Burkina Faso | Available | MultiChoice |
| February 26, 2024 | Burundi | Available | MultiChoice |
| February 26, 2024 | Cameroon | Available | MultiChoice |
| February 26, 2024 | Cape Verde | Available | MultiChoice |
| February 26, 2024 | Central African Republic | Available | MultiChoice |
| February 26, 2024 | Democratic Republic of the Congo | Available | MultiChoice |
| February 26, 2024 | Equatorial Guinea | Available | MultiChoice |
| February 26, 2024 | Eritrea | Available | MultiChoice |
| February 26, 2024 | Eswatini | Available | MultiChoice |
| February 26, 2024 | Ethiopia | Available | MultiChoice |
| February 26, 2024 | Gabon | Available | MultiChoice |
| February 26, 2024 | Gambia | Available | MultiChoice |
| February 26, 2024 | Ghana | Available | MultiChoice |
| February 26, 2024 | Guinea | Available | MultiChoice |
| February 26, 2024 | Guinea-Bissau | Available | MultiChoice |
| February 26, 2024 | Ivory Coast | Available | MultiChoice |
| February 26, 2024 | Kenya | Available | MultiChoice |
| February 26, 2024 | Lesotho | Available | MultiChoice |
| February 26, 2024 | Liberia | Available | MultiChoice |
| February 26, 2024 | Madagascar | Available | MultiChoice |
| February 26, 2024 | Malawi | Available | MultiChoice |
| February 26, 2024 | Mali | Available | MultiChoice |
| February 26, 2024 | Mauritius | Available | MultiChoice |
| February 26, 2024 | Mozambique | Available | MultiChoice |
| February 26, 2024 | Namibia | Available | MultiChoice |
| February 26, 2024 | Niger | Available | MultiChoice |
| February 26, 2024 | Nigeria | Available | MultiChoice |
| February 26, 2024 | Republic of the Congo | Available | MultiChoice |
| February 26, 2024 | Rwanda | Available | MultiChoice |
| February 26, 2024 | São Tomé and Príncipe | Available | MultiChoice |
| February 26, 2024 | Senegal | Available | MultiChoice |
| February 26, 2024 | Seychelles | Available | MultiChoice |
| February 26, 2024 | Sierra Leone | Available | MultiChoice |
| February 26, 2024 | South Africa | Available | MultiChoice |
| February 26, 2024 | South Sudan | Available | MultiChoice |
| February 26, 2024 | Tanzania | Available | MultiChoice |
| February 26, 2024 | Togo | Available | MultiChoice |
| February 26, 2024 | Uganda | Available | MultiChoice |
| February 26, 2024 | Zambia | Available | MultiChoice |
| February 26, 2024 | Zimbabwe | Available | MultiChoice |
| April 22, 2024 | Greece | Available | Cosmote TV |
| October 22, 2024 | Algeria | Available | beIN Media Group |
| October 22, 2024 | Bahrain | Available | beIN Media Group |
| October 22, 2024 | Chad | Available | beIN Media Group |
| October 22, 2024 | Comoros | Available | beIN Media Group |
| October 22, 2024 | Djibouti | Available | beIN Media Group |
| October 22, 2024 | Egypt | Available | beIN Media Group |
| October 22, 2024 | Iran | Available | beIN Media Group |
| October 22, 2024 | Iraq | Available | beIN Media Group |
| October 22, 2024 | Jordan | Available | beIN Media Group |
| October 22, 2024 | Kuwait | Available | beIN Media Group |
| October 22, 2024 | Lebanon | Available | beIN Media Group |
| October 22, 2024 | Libya | Available | beIN Media Group |
| October 22, 2024 | Mauritania | Available | beIN Media Group |
| October 22, 2024 | Morocco | Available | beIN Media Group |
| October 22, 2024 | Oman | Available | beIN Media Group |
| October 22, 2024 | Palestine | Available | beIN Media Group |
| October 22, 2024 | Qatar | Available | beIN Media Group |
| October 22, 2024 | Saudi Arabia | Available | beIN Media Group |
| October 22, 2024 | Somalia | Available | beIN Media Group |
| October 22, 2024 | Sudan | Available | beIN Media Group |
| October 22, 2024 | Syria | Available | beIN Media Group |
| October 22, 2024 | Tunisia | Available | beIN Media Group |
| October 22, 2024 | United Arab Emirates | Available | beIN Media Group |
| October 22, 2024 | Yemen | Available | beIN Media Group |
| November 1, 2024 | Thailand | Available | Mono Max |
| February 14, 2025 | India | Available | Disney Star (JioHotstar) |
| February 25, 2025 | Turkey | Available | beIN Media Group |
| May 23, 2025–June 5, 2026 (Note: As a content hub on Blast TV) | Philippines | Discontinued | Blast TV |
| October 1, 2025 | Kazakhstan | Available | Amediateka |

== See also ==
- List of streaming media services
- 10Play
- BET+
- FuboTV
- My5
- Nick+
- Noggin
- Philo
- HBO Max
- Discovery+
- Pluto TV
