= MTV (Middle East) =

- Final logo used from August 30, 2011 to January 5, 2015
- Broadcast area: Middle East, North Africa, Horn of Africa
- Headquarters: Dubai, United Arab Emirates

Programming
- Languages: English, Literary Arabic, Gulf Arabic
- Picture format: 576i (4:3 SDTV)

Ownership
- Owner: Paramount Networks EMEAA
- Sister channels: Club MTV; MTV 80s MTV 90s MTV 00s MTV Live; Nickelodeon; Nicktoons; Nick Jr. Comedy Central; Paramount Channel

History
- Launched: 27 October 2007; 18 years ago (as MTV Arabia); 30 August 2011; 15 years ago (as MTV Middle East)
- Replaced: MTV Europe
- Closed: 5 January 2015; 11 years ago
- Replaced by: MTV Europe; MTV Live
- Former names: MTV Arabia

Links
- Website: www.mtvme.net

MTV Middle East, formerly MTV Arabia, was a free-to-air music television channel, and the Middle Eastern incarnation of MTV. As an addition to the MTV network, it was a joint venture between MTV Networks International and Arabian Television Network, a subsidiary of Arabian Broadcasting Network, and part of Arab Media Group, the largest media group in the United Arab Emirates. Launched as MTV Arabia, the channel was rebranded as MTV Middle East on August 30, 2011.

The channel began its initial broadcast on October 27, 2007, and was launched on November 17, 2007. As of 5 January 2015, MTV Middle East has stopped airing on Nilesat, and moved the whole localised channel to pay TV model on OSN under the both names MTV Europe and MTV Live HD.

== Beginnings ==
Screenshot of MTV Arabia during its initial broadcast, saying: "You Are MTV Arabia"

The first mention of the project came within the coverage of MTV's 25th anniversary in 2006, and was revealed by Faisal Abbas, the media editor of the London-based pan-Arab daily, Asharq Al-Awsat, which reported that MTV is "very interested in the Arab satellite channel market" and quoted Dean Possenniskie, the network's vice president and general manager for emerging markets, saying, "Hopefully [we] will be in the market in the next 24 months" but "it all depends on finding the right local partners".

MTV Europe was previously available in the region through a special deal with Showtime Arabia. The Showtime Arabia channel provided some Arabic music videos and a locally produced program called "Mashaweer" that later got renamed "Salaam" whose hosts included regional DJ Madjam & main host Susie iliyan.

== Content ==
The channel aims to be a platform for the Arab youth, letting their opinions be a large factor in future programming. It will be likely that MTV Arabia will be pushing local R&B and hip hop music, which other Arab music stations like Rotana and Melody don't heavily feature says Patrick Samaha the General Manager of MTV Arabia.
