= Nicktoons (disambiguation) =

Nicktoons is a collective name used by the American pay television channel Nickelodeon for their original animated series.

Nicktoons may also refer to:

- Nicktoons (American TV channel)
- Nicktoons (UK & Ireland)
- Nicktoons (Netherlands)
- Nicktoons (Germany)
- Nicktoons (Sub-Saharan Africa)
- Nicktoons (Arabia)
- Nicktoons (Global), covering multiple countries in Eastern Europe
- Nicktoons (Middle Eastern and North African TV channel)
- Nickelodeon (Latin America) § Nicktoons, running from 2013 to 2020
- Nicktoons (France)

== See also ==
- Nickelodeon (disambiguation)
