= Tag 91.1 =

ARN TAG 91.1
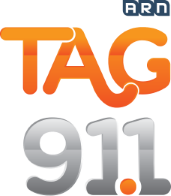
- Dubai; Philippines
- Broadcast area: United Arab Emirates
- Frequency: 91.1 MHz
- Branding: TAG 91.1

Programming
- Languages: Filipino; English (secondary)
- Format: Contemporary MOR, OPM
- Affiliations: Arabian Radio Network

Ownership
- Owner: Arab Media Group; (Arabian Radio Network)
- Sister stations: Dubai 92; Radio Shoma 93.4 FM; Hit 96.7; Al Arabiya 99; Al Khaleejiya 100.9; City 101.6; Dubai Eye 103.8; Virgin Radio 104.4

History
- First air date: March 24, 2013

Technical information
- Class: all

Links
- Webcast: TAG 91.1 - Listen Live
- Website: tag911.ae

Tag 91.1 (stylized TAG 91.1) is a radio station in Dubai, United Arab Emirates. It is one of the nine radio stations under the Arabian Radio Network (ARN). It caters to the Filipinos in the UAE, as it is the first Filipino-language premium station there.

Tag 91.1 was launched on March 24, 2013 and started airing a day later (March 25).

== Disc jockeys ==
Tag 91.1 calls its disc jockeys as RJs (radio jocks).

- Bluebird (Joselito F. Echivarria)
- Keri Belle
- Pepper Reu
- Louie da Costa (Louise Serrano - da Costa) (formerly of Citylite 88.3 (now Jam 88.3) and Virgin Radio 104.4)
- Maria Maldita (Jonaphine Caraan) (former DJ of 101.1 Yes FM)
- Johnny Biryani (formerly of 103.9 iFM Baguio)
- Papsi Loyd
- Mandi Tuesday
- Alfred Ryce
- Andy Sal
- Kristy Nola

== Programs ==
Time	Monday to Friday	Saturday and Sunday
01:00 AM	TAG Steady Na	TAG Steady Na
02:00 AM	TAG Steady Na	TAG Steady Na
03:00 AM	TAG Steady Na	TAG Steady Na
04:00 AM	TAG Steady Na	TAG Steady Na
05:00 AM	TAG Gising Na (Maria Maldita and Johnny Biryani)	Music Express
06:00 AM	TAG Gising Na (Maria Maldita and Johnny Biryani)	Music Express
07:00 AM	TAG Gising Na (Maria Maldita and Johnny Biryani)	Music Express
08:00 AM	TAG Gising Na (Maria Maldita and Johnny Biryani)	Patok Jeproks (Papsi Loyd)
09:00 AM	TAG Gising Na (Maria Maldita and Johnny Biryani)	Patok Jeproks (Papsi Loyd)
10:00 AM	TAG Halina (Pepper Reu)	Patok Jeproks (Papsi Loyd)
11:00 AM	TAG Halina (Pepper Reu)	Pinoy Song Hits (Mandi Tuesday)
12:00 NN	TAG Halina (Pepper Reu)	Pinoy Song Hits (Mandi Tuesday)
01:00 PM	TAG Halina (Pepper Reu)	Pinoy Song Hits (Mandi Tuesday)
02:00 PM	TAG Break Na (Louie da Costa)	Bandang Hapon (Alfred Ryce)
03:00 PM	TAG Break Na (Louie da Costa)	Bandang Hapon (Alfred Ryce)
04:00 PM	TAG Pack Up Na (Keri Belle and Kristy Nola with Andy Sal)	Bandang Hapon (Alfred Ryce)
05:00 PM	TAG Pack Up Na (Keri Belle and Kristy Nola with Andy Sal)	TAG 20-20 (Andy Sal)
06:00 PM	TAG Pack Up Na (Keri Belle and Kristy Nola with Andy Sal)	TAG 20-20 (Andy Sal)
07:00 PM	TAG Pack Up Na (Keri Belle and Kristy Nola with Andy Sal)	TAG 20-20 (Andy Sal)
08:00 PM	TAG Pack Up Na (Keri Belle and Kristy Nola with Andy Sal)	TAG Music Muna
09:00 PM	TAG Puyatan Na (Bluebird)	TAG Music Muna
10:00 PM	TAG Puyatan Na (Bluebird)	TAG Music Muna
11:00 PM	TAG Puyatan Na (Bluebird)	TAG Music Muna
12:00 AM	TAG Puyatan Na (Bluebird)	TAG Music Muna

== See also ==
- Radio and television channels of Dubai

== Awards ==
Ahlan Best in Dubai - Best Radio Station Oct 2013
