= Nicktoons (Middle Eastern and North African TV channel) =

Arab pay television channel

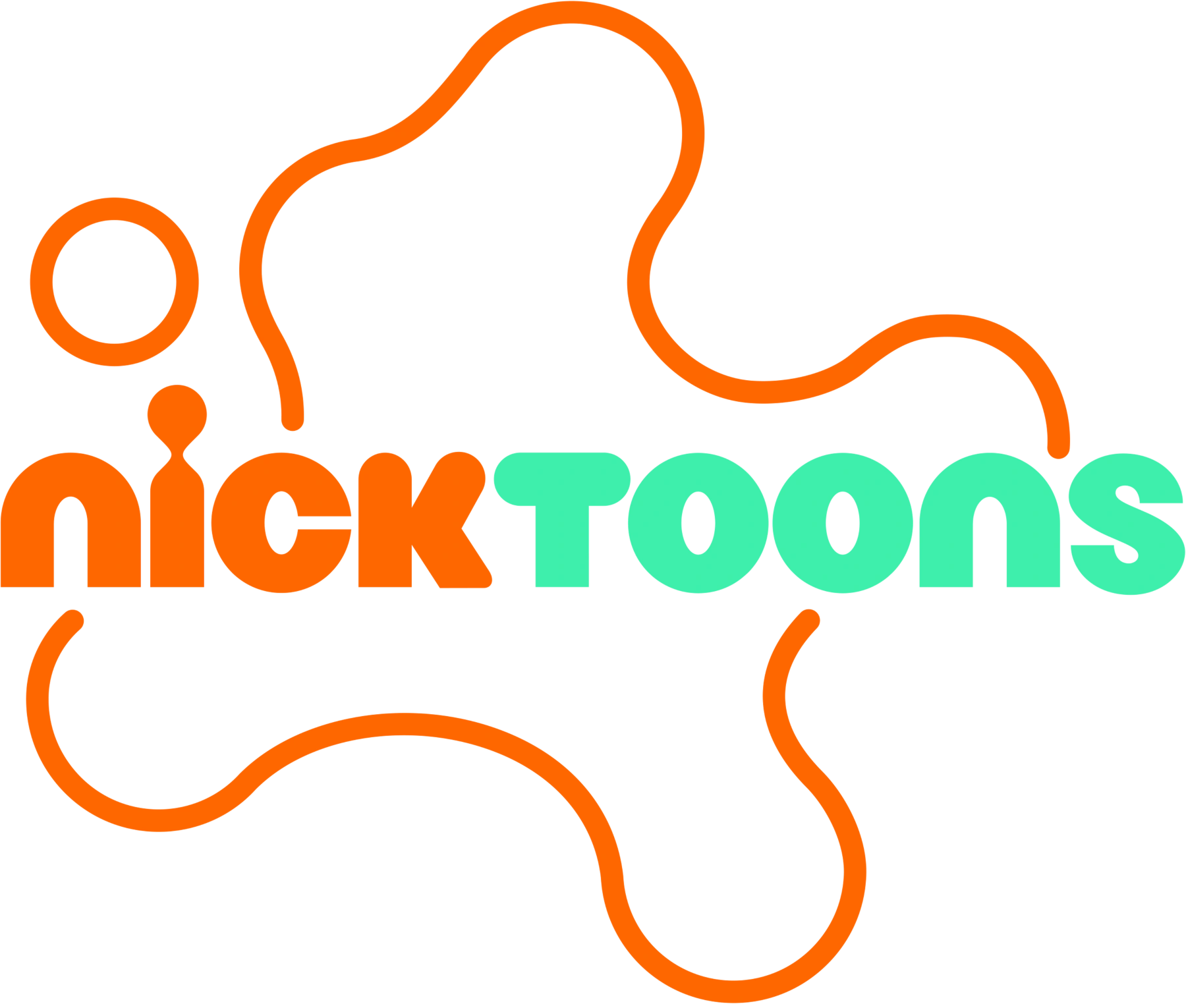
- Logo used since 20 May 2024
- Country: United Arab Emirates
- Broadcast area: Middle East, North Africa List: United Arab Emirates; Lebanon; Saudi Arabia; Qatar; Egypt; Jordan; Iraq; Oman; Syria; Kuwait; Palestine; Yemen; Somalia; Bahrain; Morocco; Libya; Algeria; Tunisia; Mauritania
- Network: OSNtv
- Headquarters: Dubai, United Arab Emirates

Programming
- Languages: Arabic; English
- Picture format: 1080i HDTV

Ownership
- Owner: Paramount Networks EMEAA (Paramount)
- Parent: Nickelodeon Group
- Sister channels: Nickelodeon; Nick Jr. Teen Nick; Club MTV; MTV 80s MTV 90s MTV 00s MTV Live; Comedy Central; Paramount Channel

History
- Launched: 23 July 2008; 17 years ago (as a block); 15 February 2017; 9 years ago (re-launch as channel)
- Closed: 8 September 2011; 14 years ago (original)

Nicktoons is a children’s Arab pay television channel broadcasting to the Middle East & North Africa. Nicktoons was launched on 15 February 2017 and uses the British/Irish version's on-air broadcast graphic package produced by Beautiful Creative. The channel is available on OSNtv.
