= Radio and television channels of Dubai =

Dubai is a media hub for the Middle East region and is home to many television and radio channels.

== Dubai Television ==
There are a few terrestrial television channels but most people choose from the hundreds of regional channels on offer via satellite or cable.

Pay or subscription television in Dubai is available on cable via E-Vision (a division of Etisalat) or via satellite directly from the providers; OSN (Orbit Showtime Network), Star TV and ART. OSN provides a wide selection of English (primarily US, but also UK, Canadian, New Zealand and Australian) programming, subtitled in Arabic. Leading English shows and movies are primarily shown first and exclusively on OSN. Star TV also has some first-run programmes.

The main free to air English television channels are Dubai One, MBC4, MBC Action, MBC2, Physique TV and City 7 TV. Most shows are broadcast in English, with Arabic subtitles, with the exception of City 7 that does not subtitle their programming. Dubai One, MBC 4 and MBC Action show mostly well known US, and some UK series but will generally be six months or more behind the pay or subscription channels.

The main Free to air Hindi television Channel is Imagine Movies, it is the first Free to Air Hindi Channel from MENA region. The Frequency is also available in Du -91, Elife - 863, OSN, Oreedoo in Qatar.

- Dubai One, an English language general entertainment channel, available over the Middle East and North Africa.
- Physique TV, Physique TV is the first and only 24-hour HD television channel in English & Arabic dedicated to fitness, healthy living, nutrition and action sport.
- City 7 TV, an independent Dubai based, free-to-air, 100% English-language channel. Providing locally produced English News, Business and lifestyle programmes combined with International lifestyle, drama and comedy programmes. Available via satellite in the Middle East and North Africa.

== Dubai Radio ==
Dubai is well served by terrestrial radio (AM & FM) with a wide variety of stations broadcasting in the languages commonly spoken in the city: Arabic, English, Russian, German, French, Japanese, Italian, Hindi, Urdu, Tamil, Malayalam, Chinese, Thai, Vietnamese, Korean, Dutch, Spanish and Filipino. The FM band is particularly crowded, with a new station every 2 or 3 MHz apart, some from neighbouring Emirates.

General standards have improved greatly in the past few years and many stations are now at par with leading stations in major metropolitan cities in the world. However, the media in Dubai and the UAE is still heavily government regulated. Most stations, even those privately owned, are often still government controlled. In particular, all radio stations must cease normal broadcasting in the event of the death of a Sheikh or close relative of a Sheikh. This normally happens for a period of 3 days to a week, or more, depending on the standing of the deceased.

FM Radio in the UAE, in general, is the essential guide to surviving Dubai's hectic traffic with most stations placing importance on frequent traffic updates all through the day.

The first ever commercial radio station in the UAE was 104.8 Channel 4, which is a part of Channel 4 Radio Network. It started operations in June 1997 and is still a popular English language contemporary hit radio (CHR).

== English Radio ==
- Virgin Radio Dubai - Top 40; 104.4 FM - Arabian Radio Network
- Dubai 92 - Adult Contemporary; 92.0 FM - Arabian Radio Network
- Dubai Eye 103.8 - News, Talk & Sport; 103.8 FM - Arabian Radio Network
- Channel 4 FM - Top 40; 104.8 FM - Channel 4 Radio Network
- Luv Radio 107.1 : 90's Music - Fun Asia Network & UAQ Broadcasting Network
- Radio 1 - Top 40/Dance/R&B; 104.1 FM (Dubai), 100.5 FM - Abu Dhabi Media
- Radio 2 - 80s, 90s, 00s Music; 99.3 FM (Dubai) 106.0 FM - Abu Dhabi Media
- Pulse 95 Radio 95.0 - Acoustic, Talk, Tech - Sharjah's first English radio station. Sharjah Broadcasting Authority
- Classic FM 91.6 - Classic, Jazz and Chill Out - Abu Dhabi Media.
- RAK Radio - Classic, Old and Rock; 103.5 - RAK Media.
- Stereo 97.3 - Late 60s to 20's hits (weekdays 6/1am, weekends and holidays, etc. 6/2am, Ramadan 10/5am) DUBAI:97.3, ABU DHABI:88.7 AL AIN : 103.2 - Dubai Media Inc (launching 24/6/2026).
- Pure Ibiza Radio UAE 94.7 - Dance/House/deephouse/electronic - Pure Ibiza (CLOSED)
- Beat Radio 97.8 - Dance/House/deephouse/electronic; 97.8 FM (Dubai) - Fun Asia Network & UAQ Broadcasting Network (CLOSED)

== Arabic Radio ==
- Dubai Holy Quran 91.4 FM (اذاعة دبي للقرآن) - Al Oula Radio Network
- Abu Dhabi Radio (AM/FM) (اذاعة آبوظبي) - Abu Dhabi Media
- Abu Dhabi Quran Radio (AM/FM) (اذاعة آبوظبي للقرآن الكريم) - Abu Dhabi Media
- Dubai 93.0 FM (اذاعة دبي) - Dubai Media Inc
- Al Oula 107.7 FM (الآولى) - Al Oula Radio Network
- Al Emarat FM (اذاعة الإمارات) - Abu Dhabi Media
- Al Khaleejia 100.9FM (الخليجية 100.9) - Arab Media Group
- Al Arabiya 99FM (العربية 99) - Arab Media Group
- Al Rabia 107.8 FM (راديو الرابعة) - Channel 4 Radio Network. (Ajman Independent Studios LLC). The undisputed number 1 Arabic language radio station in the UAE, as per IPSOS.
- Fujairah 92.6 FM (اذاعة الفجيرة)
- Sharjah Radio 94.4 (راديو الشارقة) - Sharjah Broadcasting Authority
- Noor Dubai 93.9FM (اذاعة نور دبي) - Dubai Media Inc
- UAQ FM 95.6 (راديو آم القوين) - UAQ Broadcasting Network
- Radio Sawa FM (Dubai 90.5 - Abu Dhabi 98.7) (راديو سوا) - Middle East Broadcasting Networks
- Star 92.4/99.9FM (راديو ستار) - Abu Dhabi Media
- UAQ Al Quran Al Kareem 84.6 (اذاعة القوين للقرآن الكريم) - UAQ Broadcasting Network
- Sharjah Quran Radio 102.7 (راديو الشارقة للقرآن) - Sharjah Broadcasting Authority
- Sky News Arabia 90.3 (سكاي نيوز العربية) - ٍSky News Arabia

== Japanese radio ==
- Fuji FM 88.9 - Akita Radio Group
- Nippon Dubai 102.9 FM (日本ドバイ) - Arab Media Group

== Spanish radio ==
- Ibiza Global Radio 95.3 - Dance/House/deephouse/electronic; 95.3 FM (Dubai) - Ibiza Global Network S.L.
- El Monstro de Radio 92.9 FM - Arab Media Group
- Emiratos Radio de Clàsico 106.4 FM - Arab Media Group

== African radio ==
- African FM 93.6 - Arab Media Group (Dubai/Abu Dhabi/Sharjah)

== Hindi/Urdu radio ==
- Kadak 88.8 FM - Dubai, Sharjah - 97.3 FM - Abu Dhabi - 95.6 FM - Al Ain : https://www.adradio.ae/Radio-kadak Previously known as Radio Mirchi. Was rebranded to Kadak FM in July 2020
- Radio 4 - 89.1 FM (No 1 for Hit Gaane) - Channel 4 Media Networks. Number 1 Hindi Radio Station as per IPSOS March 2026 with more than 2.5 million daily listeners in the UAE.
- City 101.6 - Arabian Radio Network
- TALK 100.3 FM - Funasia Network & UAQ Broadcasting Network
- Radio Mirchi 102.4 in UAE with new radio presenters. https://mirchi.ae. Previously Suno 1024. Was rebranded to Radio Mirchi in May 2021.
- 106.2 BIG FM - Funasia Network & UAQ Broadcasting Network
- Vibe FM 105.4 - Parallel Lines Media Network. https://vibe1054.com/

== Chinese radio ==
- Dubai Dragon (迪拜龍) (Digital station) - Arabian Radio Network

== Malayalam Radio ==
=== Live channels ===
- FM 96.7 - Hit 96.7 - Arabian Radio Network
- FM 101.3 - Gold FM - Channel 4 Radio Network. They also have Meera Nandan (popular actress from South India) as their evening drive time RJ.
- AM 810 - Pravasi Bharathi
- AM 1476 - Radio Keralam
- 360 Radio (Digital Radio) https://360.radio/
- FM 92.2 HOME FM Home fm - UAE's Malayalam Digital Radio

=== Closed channels ===
- FM 90.8 - Dilse FM Not working now
- FM 99.6 - Club FM - Mathrubhumi Group[Not working from 1st Oct 2024]
- AM 657 - Asianet Radio (closed since February 2019)
- FM 96.2 - Radio Mango (closed since January 2019)
- FM 100.3 - RadioMe (closed since 2016)
- AM 1152 - Voice of Kerala (closed since early 2018)
- Flowers FM, which previously operated in the frequency of 94.7 MHz, stopped airing in July 2019. This frequency, run by Dolphin Recording Studio, was taken up by Radio Asia which now operates in this frequency.
- FM 94.7 - Radio Asia First Malayalam Radio Station in Gulf, started as 1269AM frequency in 1992 and changed to FM frequency in 2019 run by Dolphin Recording Studio. (closed since February 2024)
- FM 102.4 SUNO - this was shut down and rebranded to Radio Mirchi. Suno 1024's morning drive-time had Jaggu and Tarana as the RJs and played On AIR games such as Speedy Singh.

== Korean radio ==
- Pearl102 102.0 FM - Arabian Radio Network
- K-Pop Dubai 101.8 FM (케이팝 두바이) - Arabian Radio Network (defunct)

== French radio ==
- RadioCity 96.3

== Russian radio ==
- FM 103.2: Radio VOLNA: UAE's only LIVE Russian language radio station (Channel 4 Radio Network)
- Russian Emirates Radio - Digital station
- Radio Optimist - Best Russian internet radio in UAE

== Italian radio ==
- Radio La Musica 90.3 FM - Arabian Radio Network (Dubai/Abu Dhabi)

== Thai radio ==
- Thai Pop Dubai (ไทยป๊อปดูไบ) (Digital station) - The First Thai pop music radio in Dubai

== Tamil Radio ==
- Tamil

89.4 Tamil FM - Aaren World Media & Advertising LLC

- Radio Gilli

106.5 FM UAE - UAQ Broadcasting Network

== Telugu & Kannada Radio ==
- channel not available.

== Vietnamese radio ==
- Dubai Saigon FM 98.2 (Digital station) - Arab Media Group

== Dutch radio ==
- Tulips FM 91.9 (Digital station) - Arab Media Group (Dubai/Abu Dhabi)

== Filipino radio ==
- Tag 91.1 - Arabian Radio Network
- Wow 107- Hello FM Group

== German radio ==
- Glückliche Musik Dubai 106.7 FM - Arabian Radio Network

== Persian radio ==
- Radio Shoma 93.4 - Arabian Radio Network

== All FM stations ==
Frequency	RDS	Station	Genre	Language	Transmission Site	Height Above Sea Level (HASL)	Effective Radiated Power (ERP)	Operator
87.9 MHz	CLASSIC	Classic FM	Music	English	Dubai			Abu Dhabi Media Company
88.8 MHz	KADAK FM	Kadak FM	Music	Hindi	Dubai / Emirates Towers	360 m	5 kW	Abu Dhabi Media Company
89.1 MHz	RADIO 4	89.1 FM Radio 4	Bollywood Hits and Popular Hindi	Hindi, Urdu	Ajman			Channel 4 Radio Network
89.4 MHz	TAMIL	Tamil FM	Tamil Hits	Tamil	Ras al-Khaimah			Aaren World Media & Advertising LLC
90.5 MHz	SKY NEWS	Sky News Arabia						
91.1 MHz	TAG 91.1	Tag 91.1	OPM	Filipino	Dubai / Emirates Towers	360 m	5 kW	ARN - Arabian Radio Network
92.0 MHz	DUBAI 92	Dubai 92	Rock / Adult Contemporary	English	Dubai / Emirates Towers	360 m	5 kW	ARN - Arabian Radio Network
93.4 MHz	SHOMA	Radio Shoma	Music	Persian	Dubai			ARN - Arabian Radio Network
93.6 MHz	AFRICAN	African FM 93.6	African Hits	English, French, All African languages	Dubai, Abu Dhabi, Sharjah			Arab Media Group
94.7 MHz	IBIZA	Ibiza Global Radio	Electronic Music	English, Spanish	Emirates Towers, Dubai	360 m	5 kW	Ibiza Global Network S.L.
95.0 MHz	PULSE 95	Pulse 95	Acoustic / Talk / News / Tech / Sports	English	Sharjah			Sharjah Broadcasting Authority
95.3 MHz								
96.3 MHz (defunct)	CITY	RadioCity	Urban Contemporary	French, English	Dubai / Emirates Towers	360 m	5 kW	OneCity S.A.S.
96.7 MHz	HIT 96.7	Hit 96.7	Malayalam Hits	Malayalam	Dubai / Emirates Towers	360 m	5 kW	ARN - Arabian Radio Network
97.8 MHz	BEAT97.8	Beat 97.8	Dance	English	Dubai			Fun Asia Network
99.3 MHz	RADIO 2	Radio 2 UAE	Classic Hits	English	Dubai / Jebel Ali Teleport		10 kW	UAE Government
99.6 MHz	CLUB FM	Club FM	Malayalam / Tamil / Hindi Hits	Malayalam	Dubai			Mathrubhumi
100.3 MHz	JIO	Jio FM			Umm Al Quwain			UBN [Uaq Broadcasting Network]
101.3 MHz	GOLD	Gold FM	Malayalam / Tamil / Hindi Hits (New/Old)	Malayalam	Ajman			Channel 4 Radio Network
101.6 MHz	CITY1016	City FM	Contemporary Hits	Hindi	Dubai			ARN - Arabian Radio Network
102.0 MHz	PEARL102	Pearl 102	K-Pop	Korean	Dubai			ARN - Arabian Radio Network
102.4 MHz	MIRCHI	Mirchi 102.4	Music	Hindi				
102.9 MHz	NIPPONDUBAI	Nippon Dubai 102.9 FM	Anime Music	English, Japanese	Dubai			Arab Media Group
103.2 MHz	VOLNA	Radio Volna	Russian Hits (New / Old)	Russian	Dubai			Channel 4 Radio Network
103.8 MHz	DUBAIEYE	Dubai Eye	News / Talk / Sport	English	Dubai			ARN - Arabian Radio Network
104.1 MHz	RADIO 1	Radio 1 UAE	Top 40 / Dance / R&B	English	Dubai / Jebel Ali Teleport		10 kW	UAE Government
104.4 MHz	VIRGIN	Virgin Radio UAE	Top 40	English	Dubai	360 m	5 kW	ARN - Arabian Radio Network
104.8 MHz	CHANNEL4	Channel 4 FM	Top 40, Contemporary Hits	English	Ajman			Channel 4 Radio Network
106.2 MHz	BIG106.2	Big 106.2	Bollywood Music	Hindi	Dubai			Fun Asia Network
106.5 MHz	GILLI	Radio Gilli	Tamil Hits	Tamil	Umm Al Quwain			BM Group
106.7 MHz	GLUCKLICHEMUSIK	Glückliche Musik Dubai 106.7	RnB, Adult Contemporary, Classic Hits	English, German	Dubai			ARN - Arabian Radio Network
107.1 MHz	LUV107.1	Luv 107.1	90s & Contemporary Hits	English	Dubai			Fun Asia Group
107.8 MHz	AL RABIA	Al Rabia 107.8 FM	Arabic Hits (New & Old) Arabic Pop	Arabic	Ajman			Channel 4 Radio Network

== See also ==
- Dubai
- Dubai Media City
- Physique TV
- Dubai 33
- Dubai Media Incorporated
- Dubai One
- Arab Media Group
