= Makshoof Music =

Makshoof Music is a Middle East-based online platform dedicated to undiscovered musical talent. The platform launched in July 2010 as a part of the Middle East-based website triplew.me

== First winner ==
The winning profile from Makshoof Music's first iteration belonged to Egyptian singer/songwriter Shady Ahmed. The decision came after an extensive voting process which took into consideration public votes as well as a jury decision. The jury included Adam Grundey from Rolling Stone Middle East in addition to other music industry professionals. In January 2011, Shady Ahmed was awarded recording time at a Dubai-based studio as well as a host of other opportunities, such as a performance on Dubai One TV and a segment on City 7 TV.

== The re-launch of Makshoof Music ==
Makshoof Music partnered with EMI Arabia to offer Middle Eastern talent the chance to be on the second volume of the Rock the Kasbah compilation.
