= Hit 96.7 =

Indian radio station

- Dubai; United Arab Emirates
- Frequency: 96.7 MHz

Programming
- Languages: Malayalam, English

Ownership
- Owner: Arab Media Group; (Arabian Radio Network)
- Sister stations: Tag 91.1; Dubai 92; Radio Shoma 93.4 FM; Al Arabiya 99; Al Khaleejiya 100.9; City 101.6; Dubai Eye 103.8; Virgin Radio 104.4

History
- First air date: June 2004

Technical information
- Transmitter coordinates: 25.10409°N 55.16841°E

Links
- Webcast: Hit 96.7 - Listen Live
- Website: Hit 96.7

Hit 96.7 is a radio station in Dubai, United Arab Emirates. The radio station, which is a part of the Arabian Radio Network (ARN), by Arab Media Group, broadcasts in Malayalam. It was launched in June 2004. The jingle for the station is composed by Deepak Dev.

== Presenters ==
- Nyla Usha
- Arfaz Iqbal
- Jean Markose
- Maya Kartha
- Nimmy Jose
- Mithun Ramesh
- Dona Rijin

== Shows & Schedule ==
Name	Time	Presenter(s)	Aired Days
Big Breakfast Club	6 AM to 11 AM	Nyla Usha, Arfaz Iqbal, Jean Markose,	Monday - Friday
Life With Hit	11 AM to 3 PM	Maya Jean	Monday - Friday
Radioactive	3 PM to 8 PM	Mithun Ramesh, Nimmy	Monday - Friday
Hit on Request	8 PM to 11 PM	Dona Rijin	Monday - Friday
Non-stop music	12 AM to 6 AM		Saturday - Sunday
