= Vinaya Fenn =

Indian radio personality

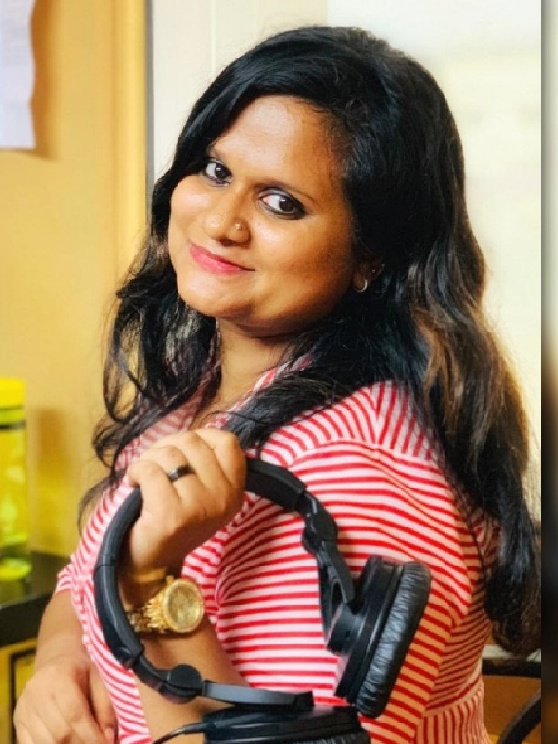
Fenn at Radio Mango in 2019

Vinaya Mariam John Fenn (born 29 April 1993), better known as RJ Vinaya, is an Indian radio jockey. Having started her career with the Malayalam channel Radio Mango, she now works in the Alappuzha branch of the network and hosts the channel's daytime programming. Her most popular programme on Radio Mango is "Timepass". In addition to her voice career, Fenn has also acted in short films including WhatsApp in Real Life.

== Early life ==
Vinaya Mariam John Fenn was born on 29 April 1993, in Kottayam, Kerala, to John and Sally Fenn.
