= Nickelodeon (disambiguation) =

Nickelodeon is an American pay television channel with the same-name spinoffs:

- Paramount International Networks § Nickelodeon, listing channels around the world, including
  - Nickelodeon (Asia)
  - Nickelodeon (UK & Ireland)
  - Nickelodeon (Middle Eastern and North African TV channel)
  - Nickelodeon (Sub-Saharan African TV channel)
- Nickelodeon Animation Studio, the channel's animation arm
- Nickelodeon Games and Sports for Kids, a former TV channel
- Nickelodeon Magazine, a children's magazine
- Nickelodeon Movies, a motion picture production company
- Nickelodeon Studios, a former television studio
- Nickelodeon Universe, an amusement park

Nickelodeon may also refer to:

== Film and cinemas ==
- Nickelodeon (film), a 1976 comedy film about the silent movie era
- Nickelodeon (movie theater), an early 20th-century form of small neighborhood movie theater
- Nickelodeon Cinema in Perth, Australia, now Luna Leederville
- The Nickelodeon Theatre, run by the Columbia Film Society

== Music ==
- Nickelodeon, an informal term for an American coin-operated mechanical music device such as a player piano or mechanical jukebox
- Nickelodeon, a 1973 album by Hudson Ford
- Nickelodeon (album), a 1971 album by The Masters Apprentices

== Publications ==
- The Nickelodeon, an early 20th-century film magazine that became Motography
- Nickelodeon (manga), a 2010 manga by Dowman Sayman

== See also ==
- TeenNick (disambiguation)
- "Put Another Nickel In – Music, Music, Music (The Nickelodeon Song)", original title of the 1949 pop song Music! Music! Music!
