= Global Village (Dubai) =

Emirati shopping venue, carnival and theme park

- Dubai Global Village
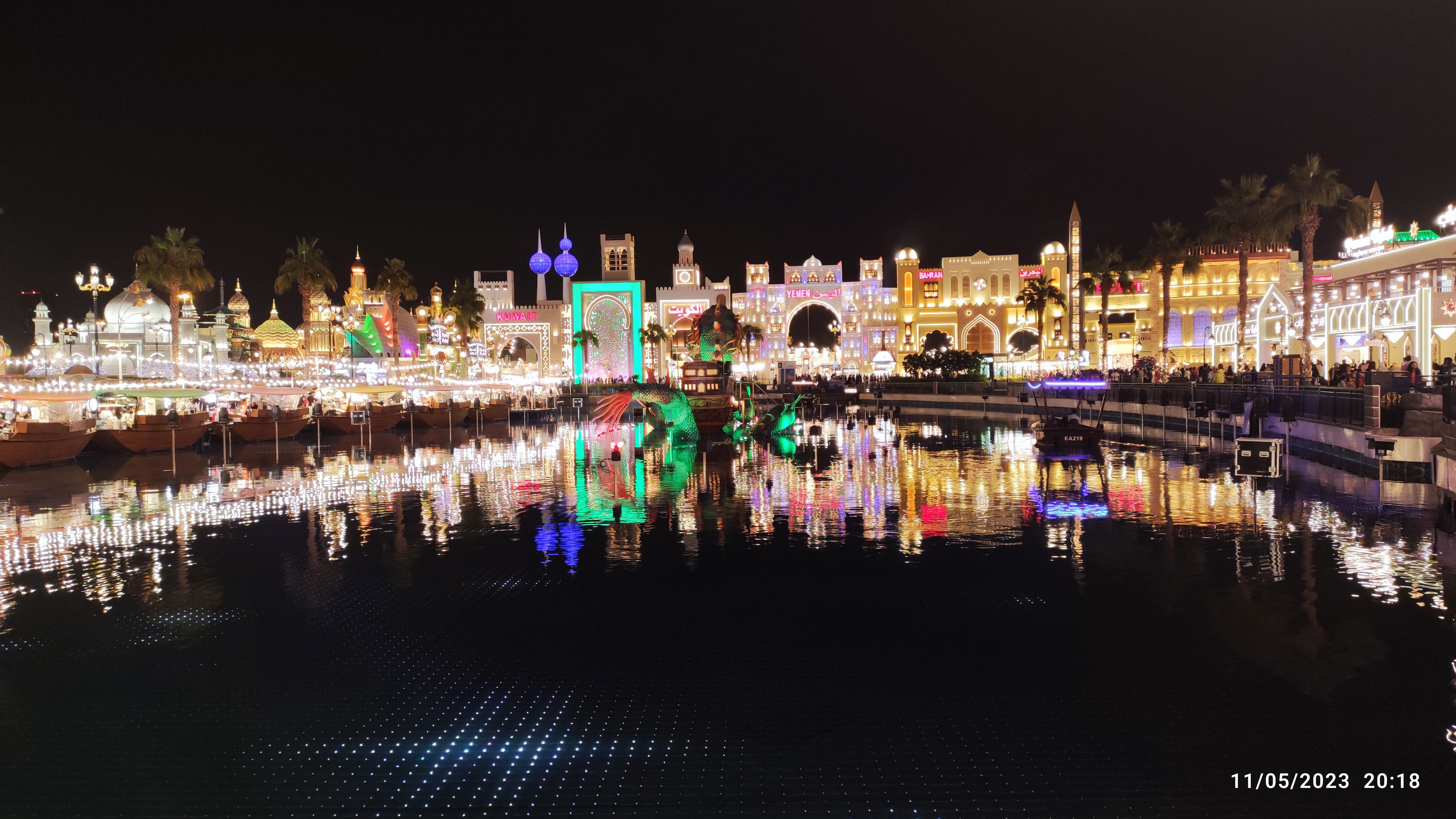
- Night view of Dubai Global village
- Interactive map of Global Village
- Address: Wadi Al Safa 4 Dubai; Dubai; United Arab Emirates
- Coordinates: 25.071686°N 55.308442°E
- Elevation: 17,200,000 m^{2} (185,000,000 sq ft)
- Owner: Government of Dubai
- Operator: Ahmad Hussain Bin Essa
- Capacity: 40,000 visitors per day
- Type: carnival village, pavilion, shopping centre
- Designation: CEO
- Record attendance: 42,000 per day (2023)
- Public transit: Dubai RTA bus Global Village; DIP Dubai Metro (20km Dubai RTA bus)
- Parking: 20,000+ parking slots

Construction
- Opened: 4 October 1996; 30 years ago

Website
- www.globalvillage.ae

Global Village is a cultural destination in the city of Dubai. It has different pavilions to showcase the culture and traditions of each country across the Globe. It is also a festive carnival where different restaurants and places are located too. Global Village is a place where people can look at the culture of different countries and regions.

Many international artists such as Shahrukh Khan, Zana Nabeel, Samira Said, Rahat Fateh Ali Khan, Jason Derulo, Liam Payne, Now United, Elissa, Neha Kakkar, Guru Randhawa, Atif Aslam etc. have performed here.

== History ==
Global Village started out in the form of a number of kiosks in January 1997 located on the Creek Side opposite to Dubai Municipality. It then later shifted to the Oud Metha Area near Wafi City for 5 years. Today, Global Village has 6 million visitors at its current location on exit of Sheikh Zayed Exit 37 in Wadi Al Safa 4.

== Sections ==
There are four main sections in the Village. These sections consist of events and concerts, carnivals, food, and shopping. The food aisle will have food from all over the world. Concerts, carnivals, and shopping are the same.

== Pavilions ==
Dubai Global Village includes pavilions, decorated in style of different countries and cultures.

List of countries at Global Village:

- Bahrain
- Bangladesh
- China
- Egypt
- India
- Iraq
- Japan
- Kuwait
- Lebanon
- Morocco
- Oman
- Pakistan
- Qatar
- Russia
- Saudi Arabia
- South Korea
- Sri Lanka
- Syria
- Thailand
- Turkey
- United Arab Emirates
- Yemen

Continents:

- Africa
- Americas
- Europe

Other pavilions:

- Khalifa Foundation
- 971 for the people

== Cityland Mall ==
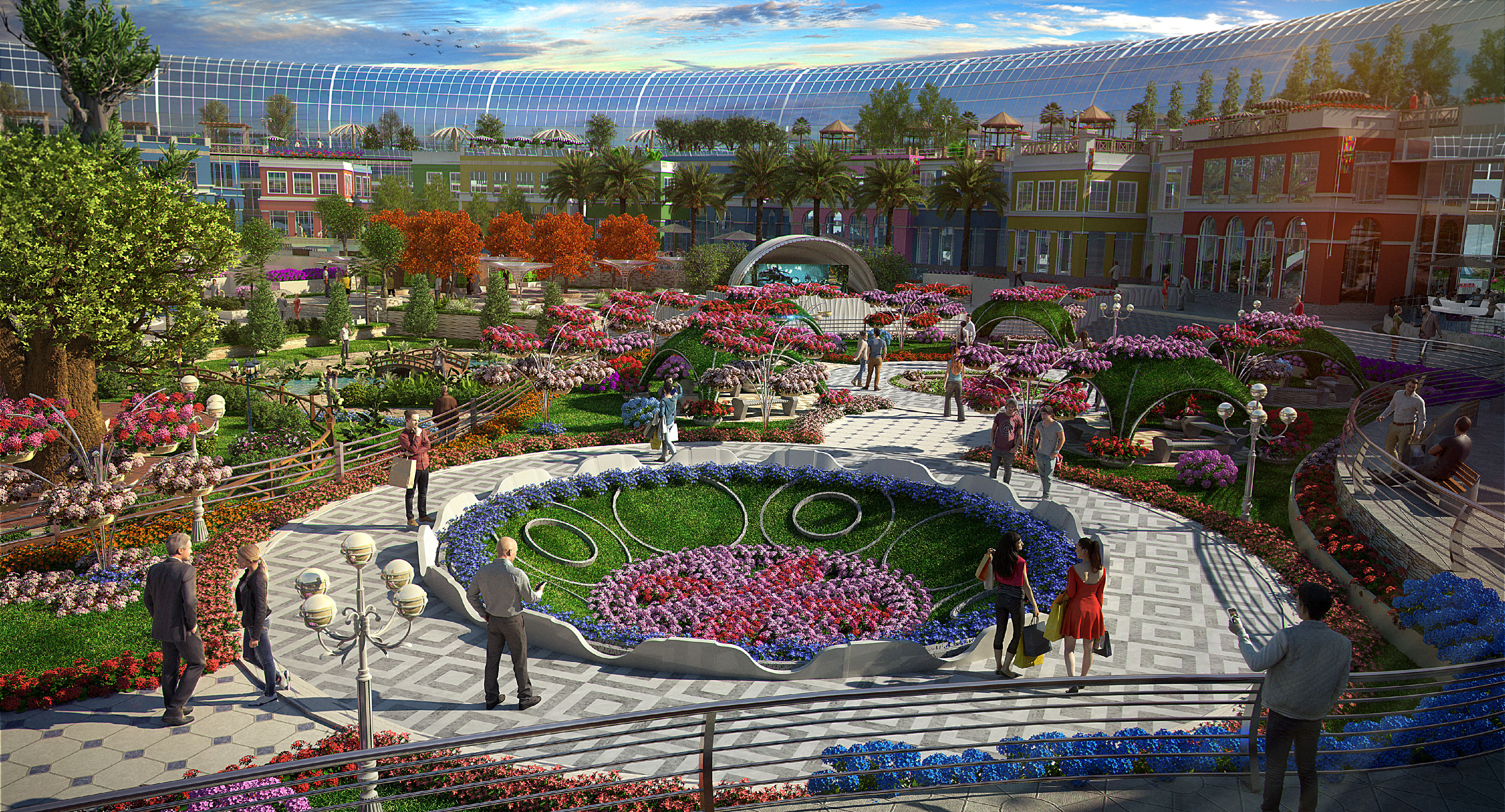
Central Park at Cityland Mall

The Cityland Mall development was completed in 2018 and is adjacent to Global Village. It is the "first nature-inspired shopping destination" and cost $400 million to build. It contains over 350 retail outlets and a 200,000 square-foot park encircled by the mall.

== Parking ==
Dubai Global Village has one of the largest capacity parking in Dubai with a total capacity of 18300 vehicles. The parking is divided into two main categories. One is general parking which is free of cost while the other is paid parking known as VIP Parking. There is valet parking available as well. The parking has a free train and shuttle bus to and from the park.

== Facts and figures ==
Year	Number of visitors
2019/20	More than 7 million visitors, From 29 October 2019 to 15 March 2020, 146 days (Closed early due to COVID-19 outbreak instead of 4 April).
2018/19	7 million visitors, From 30 October 2018 to 13 April 2019, 166 days.
2017/18	5.6 million visitors, From 1 November 2017 to 7 April 2018, 157 days.
2016/17	From 1 November 2016 to 8 April 2017, 158 days.
2015/16	From 3 November 2015 to 9 April 2016, 158 days.
2014/15	From 6 November 2014 to 11 April 2015, 156 days.
2013/14	From 5 October 2013 to 12 April 2014, 191 days.
2012	7.00 million visitors.
2011	5.00 million visitors, 151 days, and 45 country pavilions.
2008	4.50 million visitors.
2007	4.20 million visitors, 59 days, and 39 country pavilions.
2006	2.10 million visitors, 129 days, and 40 country pavilions.
2005	5.00 million visitors, 79 days. Global Village reaches its 10-year mark with a new location and longer operation period.
2004	5.20 million visitors, 38 participating countries.
2003	3.10 million visitors, 31 participating countries.
2002	2.33 million visitors, 28 country pavilions.
2001	1.68 million visitors, 25 country pavilions.
2000	1.59 million visitors, 22 country pavilions.
1999	1.45 million visitors, 20 country pavilions from around the world.
1998	1.20 million visitors, 20 country pavilions from around the world.
1997	900,000 visitors, 18 countries.
1996	Global Village was initially a small site along the Dubai Creek with small kiosks representing different countries. In its first year, Global Village had more than 500,000 visitors.

== 2018 Session ==
The 23rd session of Dubai Global village started on 30 October 2018. This season remained open until 13 April 2019. Over 90 countries and 27 pavilion are established in this season. Overall, 23 concerts will be held during this season.

== 2019 Session ==
The 24th session started on 29 October 2019. It was scheduled to close its gates for visitors on 4 April 2020 for the session, but due to the outbreak of the COVID-19 pandemic and as instructed from Dubai Culture and Arts Authority, the session was suspended early, in line with ongoing efforts to safeguard public health due to pandemic. Owing to the early closure of the park all the scheduled concerts were canceled too.

== 2020 Session (Silver Jubilee Season) ==
This was the 25th anniversary, or silver jubilee, of the park, and in keeping with the theme, the new season of Global Village launched on 25 October and ran for 25 weeks, concluding on 18 April 2021. Another change for this season was that the opening hours on Saturday have been extended. The park was open from 2 pm until 11 pm (it was previously open from 4 pm until midnight). Some accommodations were made in recognition of the continuing Covid pandemic.

The 25th anniversary season was extended to 2 May so families might enjoy Ramadan in Global Village.

== See also ==
- Developments in Dubai
- Arab Media Group
- Dubai Shopping Festival
