= AIR Manjeri FM =

Radio station in Kerala, India

AIR Manjeri FM 102.7
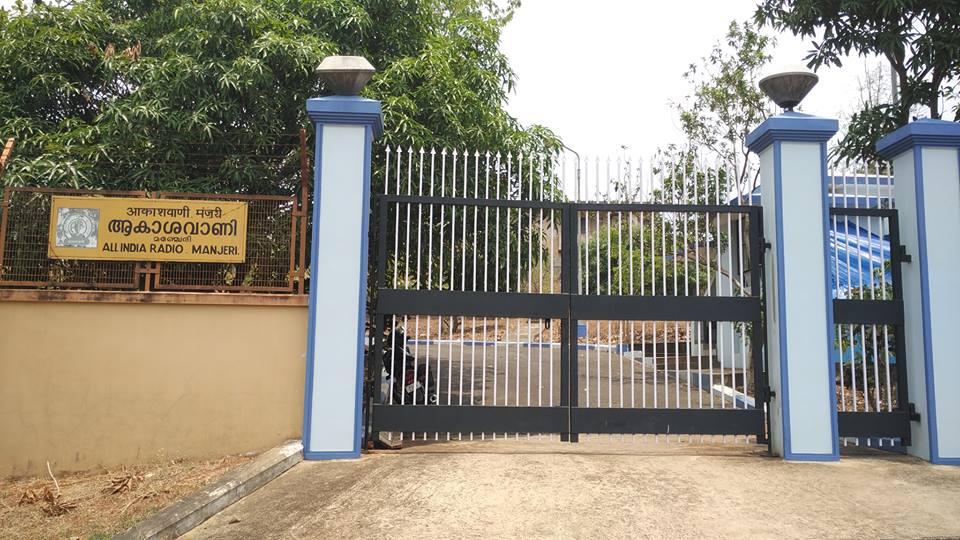
- Manjeri, Kerala; India
- Broadcast area: 3550 Sq km Fully Covered: Malappuram; Partially Covered: Kozhikode, Wayanad, Palakkad, Nilgiris
- Frequency: 102.7 MHz

Programming
- Languages: Malayalam, English
- Format: News, Radio drama, Music

Ownership
- Owner: All India Radio

History
- First air date: 28 January 2006

Technical information
- Transmitter coordinates: 11°7′3.14″N 76°7′58.45″E

Links
- Webcast: Listen live
- Website: allindiaradio.gov.in/Station/MANJERI/Pages/default.aspx

AIR Manjeri FM 102.7 is an FM radio station located in Manjeri, operated by All India Radio. It broadcasts programs varying from news to entertainment and its broadcast area covers the Malappuram district, major parts of Kozhikode, Wayanad, Palakkad, some areas of Thrissur and the Nilgiris district of Tamil Nadu. According to the statistics of All India Radio, there are approximately 80 lakh listeners.

== History ==
It was inaugurated on 28.1.2006 by the former Minister of State for External Affairs, E. Ahammed. At the time, when it launched, the station was named as Dreamz FM and it functioned as a relay station of All India Radio, Kozhikode. D. Pradeep Kumar was the first Programme Executive. The first transmission executive was Mathew Joseph and the first announcer was R. Kanakambaran.

== Broadcast timings ==
The station broadcasts programs without break from 05.53 AM to 11.22 PM Till 25 January 2017, transmission was restricted from 3.55 PM to 10 PM. On 26 January 2017, as part of celebrating the 11th anniversary of the launch, the station started morning broadcast from 6.30 AM to 1.20 PM. In 2019, it was announced that station will start a 17-hour continuous transmission from 5.53 AM to 11.06 PM without break. Thus, from 2 June onwards, it became the first and only AIR station in Kerala to have continuous transmission.

== See more ==
- List of Malayalam-language radio stations
- Vividh Bharati
