= Physique TV =

- Country: United Arab Emirates
- Broadcast area: Middle East; North Africa
- Headquarters: Dubai, United Arab Emirates

Programming
- Language(s): Arabic; English
- Picture format: 1080i HDTV; 576i SDTV

Ownership
- Owner: Starlight General Trading L.L.C.

History
- Launched: December 2013

Links
- Website: www.physique-tv.com

Physique TV is the MENA region's first and only 24-hour HD television channel dedicated to physical fitness, healthy living, nutrition, and action sport. It is available in both Arabic and English.

Physique TV is a part of the SGT Group of companies. Established in 1996, SGT is one of the business groups headquartered in Dubai, United Arab Emirates.

== Reach ==
- Arabsat - 20 million households
- Du (basic) UAE channel 412 - 227,000 households
- e life (basic) UAE channel 577 - 114,000 households
- Other cable channels - 500,000 households
