= TeenNick (disambiguation) =

TeenNick may refer to:

- TeenNick, an American television channel
- TEENick, a former programming block on Nickelodeon and the namesake of the channel
- TeenNick (Italian TV channel)
- TeenNick (Indian TV programming block), a programming block on Nick Jr. India
