= Comedy Central Arabia =

Arabic-language television channel

Comedy Central
- Broadcast area: The Middle East and North Africa (except Turkey, Cyprus and Iran)
- Headquarters: Dubai, United Arab Emirates

Programming
- Languages: English; Arabic
- Picture format: 1080i HDTV (downscaled to 16:9 576i for the standard-definition feed)

Ownership
- Owner: Paramount Networks EMEAA
- Sister channels: Club MTV; MTV 80s MTV 90s MTV 00s MTV Live; Nickelodeon; Nicktoons; Nick Jr. Paramount Channel; MTV

History
- Launched: 7 May 2016; 10 years ago
- Closed: 1 April 2023; 3 years ago

Links
- Website: www.comedycentralarabia.com

Comedy Central was the Arabic-language version of Comedy Central. It was launched on May 7, 2016. The channel shows international and local shows. It is under license from Paramount Networks EMEAA and broadcasts exclusively on OSN. It closed on April 1, 2023.

== Content ==
=== Local shows ===
Some of the local shows:

- Bad Snappers
- Comedians in Quarantine
- Comedians Solve World Problems – Arabia
- Comedy Al-Wagef
- Menna W Fina
- Ridiculousness Arabia

=== International shows ===
Arabian Comedy Central also airs shows from Comedy Central such as:

- Awkward
- Catch a Contractor
- Comedians Solve World Problems
- Comedy Central Roast
- The Daily Show
- Disaster Date
- Falcon Dash
- Friends
- Friendzone
- Hungry Investors
- Impractical Jokers
- Inside Amy Schumer
- Jeff Ross Presents Roast Battle
- Lip Sync Battle
- Martha & Snoop's Potluck Dinner Party
- Nathan for You
- Real Husbands of Hollywood
- Roast Battle
- South Park
- Takeshi's Castle
- Tosh.0
- Wanda Sykes: Tongue Untied
- Workaholics
