= Nick Jr. (Middle East and North Africa) =

Arab-language children's television channel

- Broadcast area: Middle East and North Africa

Programming
- Languages: Arabic; English
- Picture format: 1080i HDTV (downscaled to 16:9 576i for the standard-definition feed)

Ownership
- Owner: Paramount Networks EMEAA
- Parent: Nickelodeon Group
- Sister channels: Nickelodeon; Nicktoons; Teen Nick; Club MTV; MTV 80s MTV 90s MTV 00s MTV Live; Comedy Central; Paramount Channel

History
- Launched: 23 July 2008; 17 years ago (original block); 5 January 2015; 11 years ago (re-launch as channel)
- Closed: 8 September 2011; 14 years ago (original block)

Nick Jr. is an Arab television channel in the Middle East and North Africa operated by a joint venture between Paramount Networks EMEAA and OSN. The channel is aimed at pre-school children, Similar to the French version of the channel is known as “Nickelodeon Junior” in promos but still uses the shortened logo used on other feeds. Until 2011, it was the last remaining Nick Jr. to retain the 2D-3D animated pop-up-book-style ident package that was used from 2005 to 2010 internationally.

== History ==
=== Programming block on Nickelodeon (2008–2011) ===
Nick Jr. was first introduced to Arab viewers on 23 July 2008 as a programming block on Nickelodeon. By 2011, it was the only international Nick Jr. worldwide that had not changed its logo from the 2D-3D animated pop-up-book-style ident package to the orange and blue text after the mother company's 2009 rebrand. On 8 September 2011 when Nickelodeon's Arab feed was closed down & all programs (except for Oobi) were moved to MBC3.

=== Re-launch & start as full-time channel (2015–present) ===
Nick Jr. was re-introduced to the Arab world along with Nickelodeon on 5 January 2015 on the Emirati provider OSN.

== See also ==
- Nickelodeon (Middle Eastern and North African TV channel)
- Nicktoons (Middle Eastern and North African TV channel)
