= Global Radio 91.2 FM =

Alappuzha, Kerala; India
- Frequency: 91.2 MHz

Programming
- Language: Malayalam
- Format: Variety

Ownership
- Owner: Global Community Radio 91.2 FM

History
- First air date: 2014

Links
- Website: http://globalradio.in/

Global Community Radio 91.2 FM is an FM radio station for the state of Kerala in India. It is the first FM radio station in the city of Alappuzha. It operates inside the radius of 30 to 40 km which helps to reach audience in Alappuzha, Haripad, Chengannur, Cherthala, Kayamkulam, Mavelikkara, Thiruvalla & Changanassery. Frequency of the station is 91.2 and it is located in Ambalapuzha in Alappuzha District it host various programs that entertain the listeners. The station is a community radio station managed by Global Education Net (Genet) based in Ambalappuzha.

== See also ==
- List of Malayalam-language radio stations
