= Mar Athanasios College for Advanced Studies, Tiruvalla =

College in Pathanamthitta, Kerala

Mar Athanasios College For Advanced Studies, Thiruvalla (MACFAST)
- MACFAST
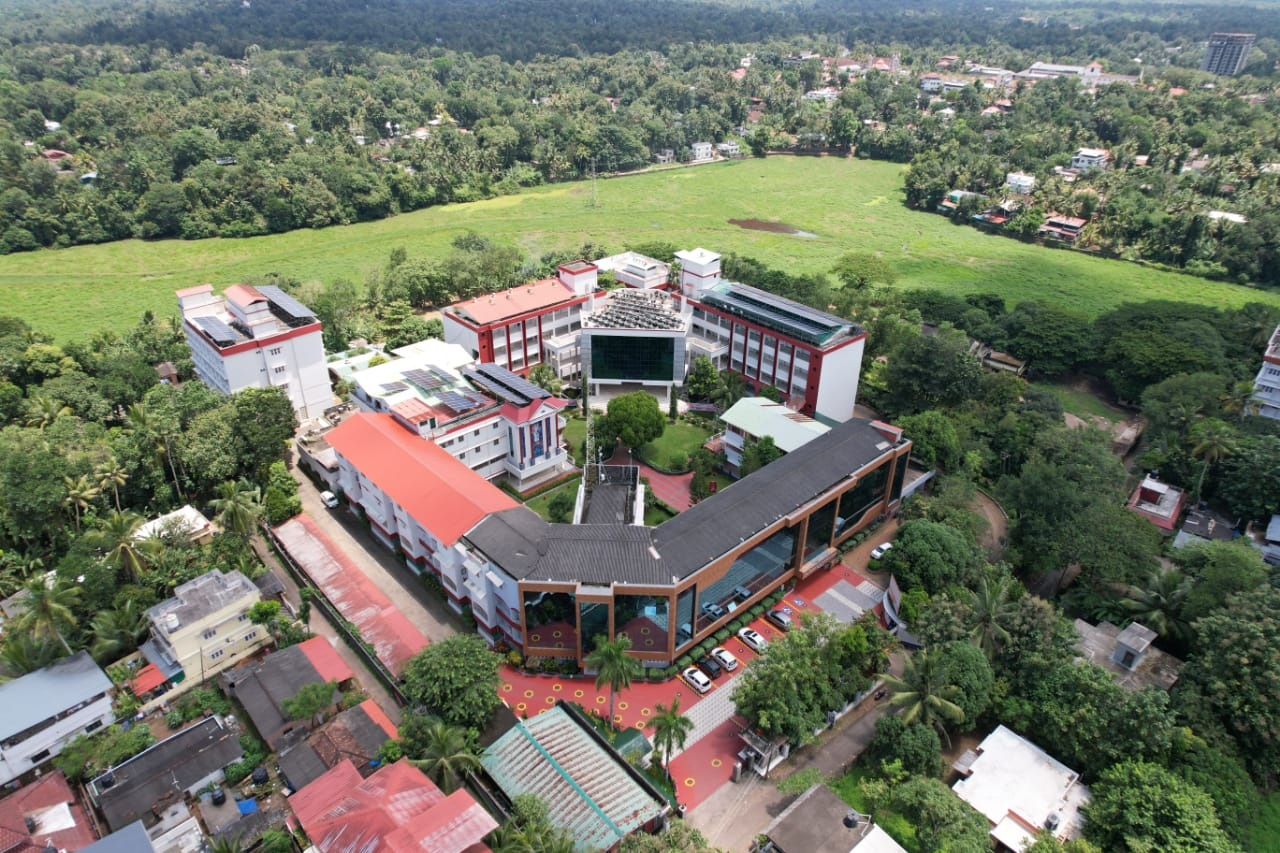
- Aerial view of MACFAST campus
- Affiliations: MG University
- Principal: Dr. Varghese K Cheriyan
- Director: Fr. Dr. Cherian J. Kottayil
- Location: Thiruvalla, Kerala, India; 9.3734°N 76.5847°E
- Website: macfast.org
- Location within Kerala Location within India

Mar Athanasios College For Advanced Studies Thiruvalla (MACFAST) is a research institute in Pathanamthitta, Kerala, India established in 2001. The college offers courses in business management, information technology and bio sciences.

== History ==
MACFAST is owned and managed by the Corporate Educational Agency of the Catholic Archdiocese of Tiruvalla. The president is Thomas Mar Koorilos. It is located in the town of Tiruvalla, Kerala. As part of its mission to prepare students to meet the demands of the corporate and scientific world, the institute has established the MACFAST Centre for Research and Development (MCRD), offering Ph.D. programmes in the biosciences.

A research journal, Journal of Science, Technology and Management (JSTM), has been published since 2008. MACFAST owns an on-campus Community Radio Station. Radio MACFAST 90.4 is the first on-campus community radio in Kerala.

MACFAST officially inaugurated Clean And Green City Tiruvalla Project on 1 November 2010 and on 13 February 2011 the Concept Paper on the Project was released and presented to Mr. TKA Nair, the Principal Secretary to the Prime Minister of India.

In 2011, the college was declared as having the State's largest solar powered campus, by the Kerala Electricity Minister Aryadan Mohammed. The system contains 27,600 Watts panels, 30 kW bi-directional charger which functions as an inverter with grid-tie capability.

The UNAI (United Nations Academic Impact) and the UNHATE Foundation have selected an institution each from 10 countries for implementing the project aimed at facilitating secondary and tertiary education for indigenous women in the year 2015. MACFAST was the only B-School selected from India for implementing this program during that year. MACFAST in association with the UNAI and the UNHATE Foundation, is providing educational support and guidance to 20 girls from remote villages in Kerala to realise their ambitions of higher education.

MACFAST is Re-Accredited with 'A+' Grade by National Assessment and Accreditation Council (NAAC) in 2022 MACFAST was accredited in 2016 with 'A' Grade by the National Assessment and Accreditation Council (NAAC), the autonomous body funded by University Grants Commission of Government of India that assesses and accredits higher education Institutions (HEIs) in India. The college is also ranked in the 151–200 band of NIRF Ranking 2020.
