= 94.3 Club FM =

Radio station in Kerala, India

Club FM
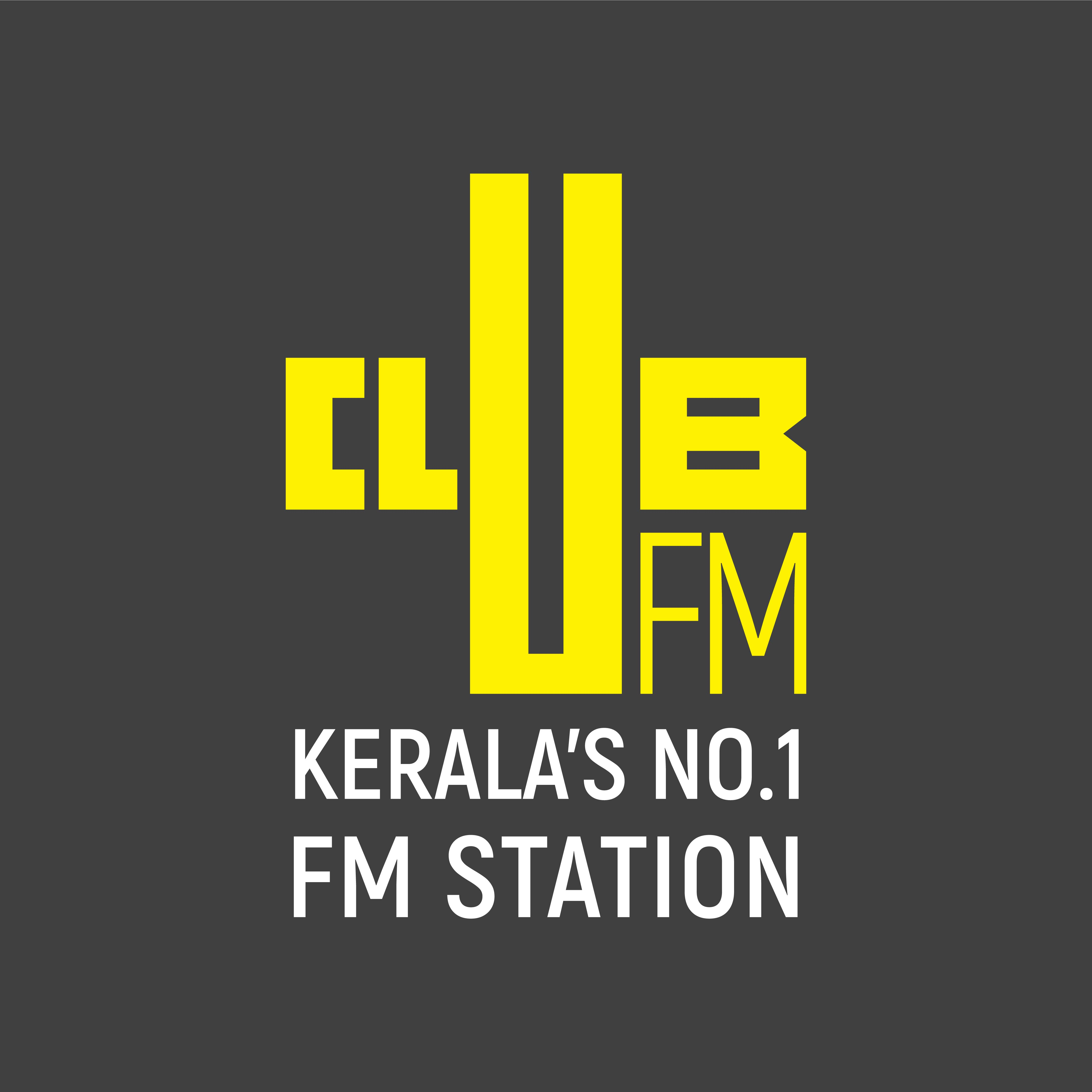
- Kerala; India
- Broadcast area: Kannur; Kozhikode; Thrissur; Kochi; Alappuzha; Thiruvananthapuram
- Frequencies: 94.3 and 104.8 MHz

Programming
- Language: Malayalam
- Format: All genre

Ownership
- Owner: Mathrubhumi

Links
- Website: clubfm.in

Club FM is a private FM radio station for the state of Kerala in India, operated by the Mathrubhumi newspaper in Kerala, specialising in popular music throughout the day. It received three RAPA awards in 2007, instituted by the Radio and TV Advertising Practitioners Association of India to honour exceptional work in radio and television. The station transmits 24/7 entertainment, songs and public awareness information. The frequency for the stations in three cities – Thiruvananthapuram, Kochi, and Kannur – is 94.3 MHz. At Kozhikode, Thrissur, and Alappuzha, the frequency is 104.8 MHz.

== Information ==
Club FM is the FM venture of Mathrubhumi group in Kerala. Club FM was first launched in Thrissur. Test transmission started by December 2007 and it started its service on the New Year day of 2008. It was launched in Kannur and Thiruvananthapuram by January 2008. Its fourth station was launched in Kochi on 17 May 2008. Its Kozhikkode station began operations on 8 February 2018. Club FM won three RAPA award in the year 2008 immediately after the launch in Kerala.

Club FM underwent a rebranding exercise and relaunched themselves on 18 January 2021 with yellow and black as their primary colours. Tovino Thomas has been revealed as the brand ambassador.

== Station locations ==
At present Club FM stations are at:

- Thrissur: Club FM 104.8, Mathrubhumi Buildings, Veliyannoor, Thrissur
- Kannur: Club FM 94.3,4th Floor, Mathrubhumi building, Nadal bpass, Edakkad Po, Kannur
- Thiruvananthapuram: Club FM 94.3, V. M. Nair Memorial Building, Vanchiyoor, Thiruvananthapuram
- Kochi: Club FM 94.3, 2nd Floor Mathrubhumi press, Manjummel Kochi
- Kozhikode: Club FM 104.8, Cherooty Road, Kozhikode
- Alappuzha: Club FM 104.8, Church Road, Pallathuruthy, Alappuzha
