= Nickelodeon (Middle Eastern and North African TV channel) =

Pan-Arab television channel

- Final logo used from 1 August 2023 to 25 November 2024 (Note: The logo's wordmark has been in use since 2010. Additionally, there is a variant meant to be used for white backgrounds; the main variant has a white wordmark in conjunction with a fully orange splat.)
- Country: United States
- Broadcast area: Middle East & North Africa

Programming
- Languages: English; Arabic
- Picture format: HDTV 1080i

Ownership
- Owner: Paramount Networks EMEAA (Paramount International Networks)
- Parent: Nickelodeon Group
- Sister channels: NickToons; Nick Jr.; Club MTV; MTV 80s; MTV 90s; MTV 00s; MTV Live

History
- Launched: June 1996; 30 years ago (Original in Showtime Network English only); 23 July 2008; 18 years ago (in Arabic); 5 January 2015; 11 years ago (relaunch)
- Closed: 8 September 2011; 15 years ago (original); 25 November 2024; 23 months ago (relaunch)
- Replaced by: Nickelodeon Global (2024–2025); Nickelodeon Asia (2025–present)

Links
- Website: nickelodeonarabia.com (in Arabic) en.nickelodeonarabia.com (in English)

Nickelodeon was a pan-Arab pay television channel for kids that was exclusively available on OSN. It was the official Arabic-localised variant of Nickelodeon and until 2011, it was the last remaining channel to retain the 'splat' logo that was used from 1984 to 2009 in the United States.

== History ==
Originally launched in June 1996 on Showtime Arabia, although at the time it was solely available in English. A standalone feed for Middle Eastern audiences was launched on 23 July 2008 with an Arabic audio track only. Nickelodeon was the second international children's television network to establish an Arabic language service, the first being Disney Channel.

It was the second channel in the joint venture between Viacom International Media Networks and Arabian Television Network, part of Arab Media Group, the largest media group in the United Arab Emirates, after the successful launch for MTV Arabia (later known as MTV Middle East). The website was nickarabia.net.

By 2011, it was the only Nickelodeon channel worldwide that had not changed its logo from the orange splat to the orange text after the mother company's 2009 rebrand. Since late 2010, the channel had been suffering a frozen broadcast, broadcasting its usual programmes repetitively without any evidence of upcoming updates. Its official website went down, and there were no clear indications or citations for why the channel was being heavily neglected, albeit oddly remaining live for the time being. Regardless, the channel remained live for many months into 2011. A similar situation was happening with its sister channel MTV Arabia.

On 8 September 2011, at one minute past midnight in U.A.E. time, and without a mainstream warning, the channel closed and went on an indefinite hiatus without any explanation. The broadcast signal initially displayed a static message indicating Nickelodeon Arabia's viewers to continue watching Nickelodeon programmes via the Nickelodeon block on MBC 3. The signal then reverted to a casual test card a few days later, and the channel was de-listed by various satellite television providers before the signal itself disappeared completely.

On 17 December 2014, it was announced that Viacom International Media Networks would launch a related feed of Nickelodeon Arabia (also in HD) on the Dubai-based pay-TV service OSN, along with a Nick Jr. channel. Both channels launched on 5 January 2015 in Arabic only, but later launched an additional English audio track in February 2015. A dedicated Nickelodeon website, social media accounts and an exclusive Nick app were launched.

In 2018, Viacom merged official websites of Southeast Asian, Middle Eastern and African versions of Nickelodeon into nick.tv.

Since 25 November 2024, the channel has been broadcasting Nickelodeon Global.

== Related channels ==
=== Nick Jr. ===
Nick Jr. logo

Nick Jr. is a satellite channel for Arab kids that airs Nick Jr. pre-school shows dubbed in Arabic. The channel launched on 5 January 2015, at 10:00 am on OSN along with Nickelodeon Arabia. It also has an English audio.

=== NickToons ===
Nicktoons logo

Nicktoons is a satellite channel for Arab kids that airs animated Nickelodeon shows dubbed in Arabic. It airs reruns of old Nickelodeon programming in Arabic. The channel launched on 15 February 2017, on OSN.

Nicktoons Arabia used Nicktoons UK & Ireland's 2014 on-air broadcast design package produced by "Beautiful Creative". It also has an English audio.

=== TeenNick ===
TeenNick logo

TeenNick is a video on demand channel for Arab kids that airs Nickelodeon's live-action TV series. It airs reruns of old and new Nickelodeon programming in English with Arabic subtitles. The channel launched on 15 April 2017.

== Programming ==
The animated shows currently airing on Nickelodeon Arabia are in Arabic and English. The live-action TeenNick shows originally aired in English with Arabic subtitles. However, original social shows produced by Nickelodeon Arabia's own studio, such as Shoof Kids and Jamaatna, were also in Arabic.

Most of the network shows were outdated, older series at the time that have already been cancelled or have ended before their debut, with the exception of SpongeBob SquarePants, although they are considered fairly never-before-seen by most of the Arab audience at one time, in either their English or Arabic formats. There were even several series yet to debut on Nickelodeon Arabia, with exception of The Fairly OddParents, which apparently already settled on Disney Channel Arabia in 2006, and settled on Nicktoons Arabia years later in 2017. Fairly OddParents characters would appear in activity segments from Nickelodeon Magazine cutouts.

Like most Arab channels, Nickelodeon was subject to censorship, but this is by far limited to simply scenes of French kissing, although any mention of said kisses are retained. This was similar to the censorship on MTV Arabia, but after the relaunch, there is no censorship.

=== Original programming on Nickelodeon's older Channel ===
==== Catch Match ====
Catch Match (كاتش ماتش) was an original show for Nickelodeon Arabia that was renewed every holy month of Ramadan. It was a kids' game show that had two opposing teams compete in a variety of physical challenges to gain the most points. This show was hosted by the announcer Taj Aser, and was filmed on location in Jeddah.

==== Shoof Kids ====
Shoof Kids was an original show that featured home-made videos sent in by viewers.
