= City 7 Dubai =

Television channel in the United Arab Emirates

City 7 TV
- Broadcast area: Arab World
- Headquarters: United Arab Emirates

Programming
- Picture format: 4:3 (576i, SDTV)

History
- Launched: 16 September 2002; 23 years ago
- Closed: 20 April 2017; 9 years ago

City 7 TV was the first English-language television channel in the United Arab Emirates producing various local programmes spread throughout the viewing day. CITY 7 TV was a satellite television channel accessible to all viewers free-to-air on Nilesat 101. It was also available on Channel 1 of Showtime, Channel 140 on e-vision and Du IPTV.

Originally called 'IN TV' and launched in December 2004 by Pakistani businessman Ali Mahmood. Then channel was later re-launched as City 7 TV by Mohi-Din BinHendi, a UAE national who saw a great opportunity to address the needs of both an expatriate audience and modern Arabs looking for local programming in English. In the last year of operation, the channel has expanded with the introduction of several locally produced news and entertainment shows. These included news, business and programmes on cars, cooking, shopping, sports, fashion, children.

City 7 TV was closed down on 20 April 2017.

== Re-launch and subsequent turbulence ==
City 7 TV was relaunched in 2007, with new programmes and a new name. However, signs of troubles begin emerging in December 2007 when the then CEO resigned, seeking a "different environment". In October 2008, the channel's 130 staff members were not paid their wages for that month. In a candid, televised interview broadcast on City 7, owner Mohidin Bin Hendi said City 7 must be "proactive". While he stated he would not sell out the channel although he might consider it if it was the right offer by the right person. The staff were then paid their regular wages.

== See also ==
- Dubai One
