= Dubai Eye 103.8 =

Coordinates: 25°2′27.0845″N 55°15′6.83″E

Dubai Eye
Dubai; United Arab Emirates
- Frequency: 103.8 MHz
- Branding: 103.8 Dubai Eye

Programming
- Format: Talk

Ownership
- Owner: Arabian Radio Network

Links
- Website: Dubaieye1038.com

Dubai Eye is a Dubai-based talk radio station owned by Arabian Radio Network, which provides business, news, current affairs, sports, entertainment and special interest programming for a cross-cultural audience.

== See also ==
- Radio and television channels of Dubai
