= Arabian Television Network =

Former UAE-based media company

- Type: Subsidiary (Government-owned)
- Industry: Satellite TV and radio
- Founded: 2007; 18 years ago
- Fate: Absorbed by Dubai Media Incorporated
- Headquarters: Dubai دبي, United Arab Emirates
- Key people: Abdulatif Al Sayegh (Chief Executive Officer)

Arabian Television Network (ATN) was a broadcast media company with its headquarters in Dubai, United Arab Emirates, and a subsidiary of Arab Media Group. Its staff and resources have been merged into Dubai Media Incorporated.

Established in 2007, it operated television channels and entered into licensing partnerships with international broadcasters, including MTV Networks International. Its operations were later absorbed into Dubai Media Incorporated.

== See also ==
- Arab Media Group
- Viacom
