= Arab Media Group =

Entertainment company in the United Arab Emirates

- Type: Subsidiary (Government-owned)
- Industry: Entertainment; Radio; Media; Event Organizer; Parks; Family Entertainment
- Founded: 2005
- Headquarters: Dubai دبي, United Arab Emirates
- Number of employees: 300
- Parent: Dubai Holding

Arab Media Group (AMG) is a Dubai, United Arab Emirates-based entertainment company and a business vertical of Dubai Holding. AMG operates in radio broadcasting, event management, and family entertainment, managing Global Village, Arabian Radio Network, and Done Events.

== History ==
Founded in March 2005, AMG has a workforce of just over 300 staff across its three Dubai-based offices.

== Subsidiaries ==
- Global Village: One of the region's family and cultural entertainment destinations.
- Arabian Radio Network, operates nine of the region’s radio stations across multi platforms attracting millions of listeners daily, making it the largest radio network in the UAE:
  - Dubai 92 - English language adult contemporary radio
  - Dubai Eye 103.8 - English language, multicultural talk radio station
  - Virgin Radio 104.4 - English language hit music station
  - City 101.6 - Hindi youth music station
  - Hit 96.7 - Malayalam youth music station with a news and information focus
  - Al Khaleejiya 100.9 - GCC station with strong UAE National focus
  - Al Arabiya 99 - Arab expatriate youth music station
  - Radio Shoma 93.4 FM - Persian
  - Tag 91.1 - the first Filipino premium radio station in the UAE
- Done Events: Done Events, an event and live entertainment company, producing annual marquee government and corporate events as well as some of the biggest concerts regionally.

== Merger ==
Due to the 2008 financial crisis, after considerable layoffs of the workforce, AMG's television assets, held via Arabian Television Network were merged with Dubai state broadcaster Dubai Media Incorporated in late 2009.

== See also ==
- Dubai Holding
- News Corporation
- Viacom
- RedfestDXB
