= Radio Mango 91.9 =

Radio network in Kerala, India

Radio Mango

India
- Broadcast area: Kochi, Thrissur, Kozhikode, Kannur, Alappuzha
- Frequencies: 91.9 MHz; 92.7 MHz

Programming
- Language: Malayalam
- Format: variety

Ownership
- Owner: Malayala Manorama

History
- First air date: 29 November 2007; 18 years ago

Links
- Website: www.radiomango.fm

Radio Mango is an Indian FM Radio network channel headquartered in Kochi, Kerala. Radio Mango started broadcasting from Kozhikode as Kerala's first Malayalam private FM station on 29 November 2007. It was established as a venture of the Malayala Manorama group, and its programming includes entertainment, music and news.

It has satellite stations in Kochi, Thrissur, Kozhikode, Kannur, and Alappuzha. From August 2014 until January 2019, it had a satellite station in Dubai and was one of the few radio stations in the city broadcasting in Malayalam. Its closure in 2019 made it the second Malayalam radio station to close in Dubai in the span of a year.

Like other radio stations, Radio Mango had to adjust to the conditions of the COVID-19 pandemic, which it did by equipping on-air talent to broadcast entirely from home, and by participating in a coalition with other stations and the national Ministry of Information and Broadcasting to broadcast information about the pandemic to listeners.

== Stations ==
| Frequency | Location | Address |
|---|---|---|
| 91.9 MHz | Kochi | C/o Malayala Manorama, Panampilly Nagar, Kochi - 682036 |
| 91.9 MHz | Thrissur | Ikkanda warrier Road, Thrissur |
| 91.9 MHz | Kozhikode | 39/1657-A, Beach Road, Puthiyappa, Puthiyangadi PO, Beach Rd, Kozhikode - 673021 |
| 91.9 MHz | Kannur | Mascot Square, SN Park Road, Payyambalam, Kannur - 670001 |
| 92.7 MHz | Alappuzha | Kommady, Alappuzha, Kerala 688007 |

=== Former Stations ===
| Frequency | Location |
|---|---|
| 96.2 MHz | Dubai |
