= List of Paramount channels =

The following television channels are owned or licensed by Paramount Skydance. For other assets owned by the company, see List of assets owned by Paramount Skydance.

== Americas ==
=== United States ===
CBS Entertainment Group

- CBS (HD; flagship network)
  - CBS Sports Network (HD) (formerly College Sports Television and CBS College Sports Network)
- Dabl (HD) (Owned by Paramount Skydance; operated by Weigel Broadcasting)
- Fave TV (HD) (exclusive to CBS News and Stations)
- The CW (HD) (75% owned by Nexstar Media Group; 12.5% owned by Paramount Skydance and Warner Bros. Discovery)
- BET Media Group
  - BET (HD)
    - BET Gospel
    - BET Her (formerly BET on Jazz, BET Jazz, BETJ, and Centric)
    - BET Soul (formerly VH1 Soul)
    - BET Jams (formerly MTV Jams until 2015)
  - VH1 (HD)

Paramount Media Networks

- MTV Entertainment Group
  - MTV (HD; flagship network)
    - MTV2 (HD; formerly M2)
    - MTV Classic (formerly VH1 Classic until 2016)
    - MTV Tres (formerly MTV en Espanol)
    - MTVU (formerly College Television Network)
    - MTV Live (HD; formerly MTV Music and Palladia)
  - CMT (HD)
    - CMT Music (formerly VH1 Country and CMT Pure Country)
  - Comedy Central (HD)
  - Logo TV (HD; formerly VH1 MegaHits)
  - Paramount Network (HD; formerly The Nashville Network, The National Network (The New TNN), and Spike TV/Spike)
  - Pop (HD; formerly Prevue Guide/Channel, TV Guide Channel/Network and TVGN)
  - Smithsonian Channel (HD)
  - TV Land (HD)
- Nickelodeon Group
  - Nickelodeon (HD)
    - Nick at Nite (HD; evening program block on Nickelodeon)
  - Nick Jr. Channel (HD)
  - NickMusic (formerly MTV Hits)
  - Nicktoons (HD)
  - TeenNick (HD)
- Showtime Networks
  - Showtime (HD)
    - The Movie Channel (HD)
    - Flix (HD)

==== Former ====
- BET Hip-Hop
- Nick GAS (1999–2007, 2009 on Dish Network)
- VH1 Uno (2000–2008)
- MTVX (1999–2002)
- Noggin (1999–2009); relaunched with the Noggin streaming app in March 2015 until 2024 and again since 2025
  - The N (Noggin block) (2002–2007, 2009 on Dish Network), channel (2007-2009)
- Showtime Beyond (1999–2020)
- VH1 MegaHits (2002–2005)

=== Canada ===
All channels listed below are owned by Canadian broadcasters, with Paramount Global owning minor interests where indicated:

- CMT (90% owned by Corus Entertainment; 10% owned by Paramount Global)
- MTV (wholly owned by Bell Media; closed on December 31, 2024 - Formerly TalkTV from 2000 to 2006)
- MTV2 (wholly owned by Bell Media; closed on March 29, 2024 - Formerly MTV Canada from 2001 to 2005)
- Nickelodeon (wholly owned by Corus; closed on September 1, 2025 - Formerly Discovery Kids from 2001 to 2009)
  - Nick Jr. (Program block on Nickelodeon)
- Smithsonian Channel (93.33% owned by Blue Ant Media; 6.67% owned by Paramount Global)

Note: Juicebox and Comedy Gold formerly existed as MTV2 Canada from 2001 to 2005 (later PunchMuch from 2005 to 2011), and TV Land Canada from 2001 to 2010, respectively.

=== Caribbean ===
- Tr3s

=== Latin America ===
- MTV
- Nickelodeon
- Comedy Central
- Paramount Network (defunct)
- Chilevisión
- Nick Jr.
- TeenNick
- MTV Hits (defunct)
- MTV Live (defunct)
- MTV 00s (defunct)

=== Brazil ===
- MTV (defunct) (replaced MTV Brasil on 1 October 2013)
- Nickelodeon Brazil (defunct)
- Nick Jr. Brazil (defunct)
- Comedy Central (defunct)
- Paramount Network (defunct)
- Smithsonian Channel (owned by Grupo Bandeirantes; owned by Paramount)
- MTV Hits (defunct)
- MTV Live (defunct)
- MTV 00s (defunct)

== Europe ==
=== Continent-wide ===
- MTV Global (countries not served by a local MTV channel only)
- Nickelodeon Global (countries not served by a local Nickelodeon channel only)
- MTV Hits Europe (defunct)
- MTV Live (defunct)
- Club MTV Europe (defunct)
- MTV 80s (defunct)
- MTV 90s (defunct)
- MTV 00s (defunct)

=== Adria (Albania, Bosnia & Herzegovina, Croatia, Kosovo, Montenegro, North Macedonia, Serbia & Slovenia) ===
- MTV Global (replaced MTV Adria on 1 January 2018)
- Nickelodeon Global
- Comedy Central Extra
- MTV Hits Europe (defunct)
- MTV Live (defunct)
- Club MTV Europe (defunct)
- MTV 80s (defunct)
- MTV 90s (defunct)
- MTV 00s (before VH1 Europe, replaced VH1 Adria on 1 February 2015) (defunct)
- Nick Jr.
- Nicktoons Europe

=== Austria ===
- MTV Germany (replaced MTV Austria on 1 January 2011)
- MTV Austria (defunct)
- Nickelodeon Germany (replaced Nickelodeon Austria on 30 June 2025)
- Nickelodeon Austria (defunct)
- Comedy Central Germany
- VIVA Austria (2001–2003, again since 2006, closed in 2018)
- MTV Hits (defunct)
- MTV Music 24(defunct)
- Club MTV Europe (defunct)
- MTV 80s (defunct)
- MTV 90s (defunct)
- MTV 00s (defunct)
- Nick Jr. Germany
- Nicktoons Germany

=== Baltics (Estonia, Latvia & Lithuania) ===
- MTV Global closed in Eesti and Latvija (replaced MTV Eesti, MTV Latvija and MTV Lietuva since 2009)
- MTV Eesti (defunct)
- MTV Latvija (defunct)
- MTV Lietuva (defunct)
- Nickelodeon (Estonian, Latvian, Lithuanian)
- Nickelodeon CEE
- MTV Hits Europe (defunct)
- MTV Live (defunct)
- Club MTV Europe (defunct)
- MTV 80s (defunct)
- MTV 90s (defunct)
- MTV 00s (defunct)
- Nick Jr.
- Nicktoons Europe

=== Benelux (The Netherlands & Belgium) ===
- MTV Netherlands
- MTV Belgium (defunct)
- MTV Wallonia (defunct)
- Nickelodeon Netherlands
- Nickelodeon (Flanders)
- Nickelodeon (Wallonia)
- Comedy Central (Netherlands)
- Comedy Central (Flanders)
- Comedy Central Extra (defunct)
- MTV Hits Europe (defunct)
- MTV Live (defunct)
- MTV Music 24 (defunct)
- Club MTV Europe (defunct)
- MTV 80s (defunct)
- MTV 90s (defunct)
- MTV 00s (defunct)
- Nick Jr. (Netherlands & Flanders)
- Nick Jr. (Wallonia)
- Nicktoons
- NickMusic (defunct)

The French channels Game One, Paramount Channel, Comedy Central and MTV Hits are also distributed in Belgium.

=== Czech Republic ===
- Paramount Network (defunct)
- MTV Global
- MTV Czech
- MTV Hits Europe (defunct)
- MTV Live (defunct)
- Club MTV (defunct)
- MTV 80s (defunct)
- MTV 90s (defunct)
- MTV 00s (defunct)
- Nickelodeon Global
- Nicktoons Europe
- Nick Jr. Europe

=== Denmark ===
- MTV Denmark (defunct)
- Nickelodeon Denmark (defunct)
- Nickelodeon (continues to be available only through Satellite)
- MTV Hits Europe (defunct)
- MTV Live (defunct)
- Club MTV Europe (defunct)
- MTV 90s (defunct)
- MTV 00s (defunct)

=== Finland ===
- MTV Finland (2005–2019)
- Nickelodeon Finland (defunct)
- Nickelodeon (continues to be available only through Satellite)
- MTV Hits Europe (defunct)
- MTV Live (defunct)
- Club MTV Europe (defunct)
- MTV 80s (defunct)
- MTV 90s (defunct)
- MTV 00s (defunct)
- Nick Jr. Scandinavia
- Nicktoons Scandinavia

=== France ===
- MTV (2000–present)
- Nickelodeon
- Nickelodeon +1
- Comedy Central (France)
- Paramount Channel (defunct)
- Paramount Channel Décalé (+2 timeshift channel) (defunct)
- BET (defunct)
- Game One (defunct, relaunch in March 2026)
- Game One +1 (defunct, relaunch in March 2026)
- J-One (defunct, relaunch in March 2026)
- MTV Hits (defunct)
- Club MTV Europe (defunct)
- MTV 90s (defunct)
- Nickelodeon Junior
- Nicktoons France

=== Germany ===
- MTV Germany (1997–present)
- Nick Germany (replaced MTV2 Pop on 12 September 2005, Nickelodeon Germany originally broadcast from 1995 to 1998)
- Comedy Central Germany (replaced VIVA Plus on 15 January 2007)
- VIVA Germany (closed on December 31, 2018)
- MTV Hits Europe (defunct)
- MTV Live (defunct)
- MTV Music 24 (closed on 1 June 2021)
- Club MTV Europe (defunct)
- MTV Brand New (closed on 6 January 2021; replaced with MTV Hits Germany)
- MTV 80s (defunct)
- MTV 90s (defunct)
- MTV 00s (defunct)
- Nick Jr. Germany
- Nicktoons Germany

=== Greece ===
- MTV Greece (2008–2016; replaced by RISE)
- MTV Global (Greek) (defunct)
- Nickelodeon Plus (replaced MTV+; defunct)
- Nickelodeon Greece, free-to-air (defunct)
  - Nick Jr. (Morning program block on Nickelodeon; defunct)
- MTV Hits Europe (defunct)
- MTV Live (defunct)
- MTV Music Greece (defunct)
- MTV Music International (Greek-language; defunct)
- Club MTV Europe (defunct)
- MTV 80s (defunct)
- MTV 90s (defunct)
- MTV 00s (defunct)

=== Hungary ===
- MTV Hungary (2007–2022; replaced with MTV Global)
- Nickelodeon Hungary
- Comedy Central Hungary
- Paramount Network Hungary (defunct)
- MTV Hits Europe (defunct)
- MTV Live (defunct)
- Club MTV Europe (defunct)
- MTV 80s (defunct)
- MTV 90s (defunct)
- MTV 00s (defunct)
- Nick Jr. Europe
- Nicktoons Europe
- TeenNick
- Comedy Central Family Hungary (2017–2024)

=== Ireland ===
- MTV UK and Ireland (1997–present)
- Comedy Central
  - Comedy Central +1
- Comedy Central Extra
- Nickelodeon
  - Nickelodeon +1
- Nick Jr.
  - Nick Jr. +1
- Nicktoons
  - Nicktoons Replay (closed)

=== Italy ===
- MTV (HD) (1997–present)
- MTV Hits (defunct)
- MTV Gold (defunct)
- MTV Classic (defunct)
- MTV Pulse (defunct)
- MTV Brand New (defunct)
- Flux (defunct)
- QOOB (defunct)
- Paramount Comedy (defunct)
- Comedy Central
  - Comedy Central +1 (defunct)
- Nickelodeon
  - Nickelodeon +1 (defunct)
- Paramount Network (HD) (defunct)
- VH1 (HD) (defunct)
- Spike (HD) (defunct)
- Super! (reacquired by De Agostini in July 2026)
- MTV+ (defunct)
- MTV Music (defunct)
- Nick Jr.
  - Nick Jr. +1 (defunct)
- TeenNick (defunct)

=== Norway ===
- MTV Norway (2005–2019)
- Nickelodeon Norway (defunct)
- Nickelodeon (continues to be available only through Satellite)
- MTV Hits Europe (defunct)
- MTV Live (defunct)
- Club MTV Europe (defunct)
- MTV 80s (defunct)
- MTV 90s (defunct)
- MTV 00s (defunct)

=== Poland ===
- MTV Poland (2000–present)
  - MTV HD
- Nickelodeon Poland
- Comedy Central Poland
- Polsat Comedy Central Extra (replaced Comedy Central Family Poland)
- Paramount Channel Poland (replaced Viacom Blink!)
- MTV Hits Europe (defunct)
- MTV Live (defunct)
- Club MTV Europe (defunct)
- MTV 80s (defunct)
- MTV 90s (defunct)
- MTV 00s (defunct)
- Nick Jr.
- NickToons Poland HD (replaced Nickelodeon Global HD)
- NickMusic (replaced VIVA, MTV Music and MTV Music 24; defunct)

=== Portugal ===
- MTV Portugal (defunct)
- MTV Global
- Nickelodeon Portugal (defunct)
- Nickelodeon Global
- MTV Live (defunct)
- MTV 00s (defunct)
- Nick Jr. Portugal

=== Romania ===
- MTV Romania (2002–2019; replaced with MTV Global)
- Nickelodeon Global
- Comedy Central Extra (replaced with Comedy Central)
- MTV Hits Europe (defunct)
- MTV Live (defunct)
- Club MTV Europe (defunct)
- VH1 Classic Europe (replaced with MTV 80s) (defunct)
- MTV Rocks Europe (replaced with MTV 90s) (defunct)
- MTV 00s (defunct)
- Nick Jr.
- Nicktoons Europe
- Paramount Channel (replaced with TeenNick; defunct)

=== Russia ===
All operations inside Russia suspended indefinitely. Channels continue broadcasting outside the territory of the Russian Federation

- MTV Russia (Russian, SD/HD) (launched 25 September 1998. restart 1 October 2013) (defunct)
- Nickelodeon (Russian)
- Nickelodeon HD (Russian) (defunct)
- Nickelodeon Asia (Russian)
- Paramount Channel (Russian, SD/HD) (defunct)
- Spike (Russian, SD/HD) (closed on 1 June 2021)
- MTV Europe (English) (defunct)
- MTV Hits Europe (English) (closed on 1 July 2021)
- MTV Live (English) (defunct)
- Club MTV Europe (English) (closed on 1 July 2021)
- MTV 80s (English) (defunct)
- MTV 90s (English) (defunct)
- MTV 00s (English) (defunct)
- Nick Jr. (Russian)
- Nicktoons (Russian, SD/HD)
- Comedy Central (Russian, SD/HD) (defunct)

=== Slovakia ===
- MTV Global
- MTV Czech (defunct)
- MTV Hits Europe (defunct)
- MTV Live (defunct)
- Club MTV (defunct)
- MTV Rocks Europe (defunct)
- MTV 80s (defunct)
- MTV 90s (defunct)
- MTV 00s (defunct)
- Nickelodeon Global
- Nicktoons Europe
- Nick Jr. Europe
- VH1 Europe (defunct)
- VH1 Classic Europe (defunct)

=== Spain ===
- MTV Spain
- Nickelodeon Spain
- Comedy Central Spain
- Paramount Network Spain (defunct)
- MTV Hits Europe (defunct)
- Club MTV Europe (defunct)
- MTV Live (defunct)
- MTV 80s (defunct)
- MTV 90s (defunct)
- MTV 00s (defunct)
- NickMusic (defunct)
- Nick Jr. Spain

=== Sweden ===
- MTV Sweden (closed)
- Nickelodeon Sweden (defunct)
- Nickelodeon (continues to be available only through Satellite)
- Comedy Central Sweden
- Paramount Channel Sweden (defunct)
- MTV Hits Europe (defunct)
- MTV Live (defunct)
- Club MTV Europe (defunct)
- MTV 80s (defunct)
- MTV 90s (defunct)
- MTV 00s (defunct)
- Nick Jr Scandinavia
- Nicktoons Scandinavia

=== Switzerland ===
- MTV Germany (replaced MTV Switzerland on 12 January 2022)
- MTV Switzerland (defunct)
- Nickelodeon Switzerland
- Comedy Central Germany
- VIVA Switzerland (2000–2011, relaunch 1 October 2012, ended in 2018)
- MTV Hits Europe (defunct)
- MTV Live (defunct)
- NickMusic (defunct)
- Club MTV Europe (defunct)
- MTV Brand New (defunct)
- MTV 80s (defunct)
- MTV 90s (defunct)
- MTV 00s (defunct)
- Nicktoons

All French channels are also distributed in Switzerland, as well as the Italian and British free-to-air channels.

=== Ukraine ===
- MTV Ukraine (replaced by Zoom on 31 May 2013) (defunct)
- MTV Global (defunct)
- Nickelodeon Russia (Russian) (defunct)
- Nickelodeon Ukraine (Ukrainian programming block; closed in October 2017)
- MTV Hits Europe (defunct)
- MTV Live (defunct)
- Club MTV Europe (defunct)
- MTV 80s (defunct)
- MTV 90s (defunct)
- MTV 00s (defunct)
- Comedy Central Ukraine (closed)

=== UK ===
- MTV
- MTV Shows (defunct)
  - MTV +1
- MTV Music (defunct)
  - MTV Music +1 (defunct)
- MTV Base (defunct)
- MTV Hits (defunct)
- MTV OMG (defunct)
- Club MTV (defunct)
- MTV Rocks (defunct)
- MTV Classic (defunct)
- MTV Live (defunct)
- MTV 80s UK (defunct)
- MTV 90s UK (defunct)
- VH1 (defunct)
- VIVA (defunct)
- TMF (defunct)
- Comedy Central
  - Comedy Central +1
- Comedy Central Extra
  - Comedy Central Extra +1
- Nickelodeon
  - Nickelodeon +1
- Nick Jr.
  - Nick Jr. +1 & Nick Jr. Too
- Nicktoons
- BET (defunct)
- 5
  - 5 +1
- 5Star
  - 5Star +1
- 5 USA
  - 5 USA +1
- 5 (streaming service)
- 5Spike (defunct)
- Smithsonian Channel (defunct)

== MENA & Turkey ==
- MTV (defunct)
- MTV Global (Arabic)
- Club MTV (defunct)
- MTV Live (defunct)
- MTV 80s (defunct)
- MTV 90s (defunct)
- MTV 00s (defunct)
- VH1 (defunct)
- Nickelodeon Arabia (defunct)
- Nickelodeon HD (Arabic) (defunct)
- Nickelodeon Asia (Arabic)
- Nicktoons
- Nick Jr.
- TeenNick (defunct)
- Comedy Central (defunct)
- Paramount Channel (defunct)

=== Israel ===
- MTV Israel
- MTV Music 24
- MTV Hits
- MTV 00s
- MTV Rocks Europe (defunct)
- VH1 Classic (defunct)
- Hot Comedy Central
- Nickelodeon Israel
- Nick Jr. Israel
- TeenNick Israel
- Nickelodeon Arabia (certain cities only)

=== Turkey ===
- MTV Global (Turkish)
- Nickelodeon Turkey
- Nickelodeon HD (Turkish) (defunct)
- Nickelodeon Asia (Turkish)
- MTV Hits Europe (defunct)
- MTV Live (defunct)
- Club MTV Europe (defunct)
- MTV 80s (defunct)
- MTV 90s (defunct)
- MTV 00s (defunct)
- Nick Jr. Turkey

== Asia Pacific ==
=== Australia ===
- Club MTV (defunct)
- MTV Australia & New Zealand (defunct)
- MTV (Global) (defunct)
- MTV 80s (defunct)
- MTV 90s (defunct)
- MTV 00s (defunct)
- MTV Biggest Pop (defunct)
- MTV Dating (defunct)
- MTV Drama (defunct)
- MTV Entertainment
- MTV Hits (defunct)
- MTV Love (defunct)
- MTV On Tour! (defunct)
- MTV Reality (defunct)
- MTV Retro (defunct)
- Nickelodeon Australia & New Zealand (defunct)
- Nickelodeon (free-to-air)
- Nick Jr. (defunct)
- Nick Jr. Club (defunct)
- NickClassics
- NickMusic (defunct)
- NickRewind
- NickTeen (original, from 2013 to 2025)
- TeenNick (relaunch)
- NickToons (defunct)
- Comedy Central (defunct)
- CMT (closed)
- Network 10 / 10HD
- 10 Comedy
- 10 Drama

=== China ===
- MTV China (closed)
- MTV Mandarin (Chinese Mandarin) (closed)
- HaHa Nick (closed)

=== India ===
- MTV India (HD)
- Nickelodeon India (HD)
- Sonic
- Nick Jr. India
- TeenNick India (closed)
- VH1 India (closed)
- Comedy Central (closed)
- MTV Beats (closed)

=== Pakistan ===
- Nickelodeon Pakistan (closed)
- MTV Pakistan (closed)
- VH1 Pakistan (closed)

=== Indonesia ===
- MTV Asia (closed)
- MTV Global (Indonesian)
- MTV 90s (closed)
- MTV Indonesia (re-closed)
- MTV Live HD (closed)
- VH1 Indonesia (closed)
- Nickelodeon Asia
- Nick Jr. Southeast Asia
- Comedy Central Southeast Asia (closed)

=== Japan ===
- MTV Japan (High-definition channel)
- MTV Hits Japan (closed)
- MTV Mix Japan (closed)
- Nickelodeon Japan (closed)

=== South Korea ===
- Nickelodeon South Korea (closed)
- SBS MTV (closed)

=== New Zealand ===
- MTV Australia and New Zealand (closed)
- MTV (Global) (closed)
- MTV 80s New Zealand (closed)
- MTV Hits New Zealand (closed)
- Comedy Central Australia & New Zealand (closed)
- Nickelodeon Australia and New Zealand (closed)

=== Philippines ===
- MTV, first incarnation (closed)
- MTV, second incarnation also known as MTV Pinoy (closed)
- MTV, third and final incarnation also known as MTVph (closed)
- MTV Asia (Filipino) (closed)
- MTV Global (Filipino)
- Nickelodeon Philippines
- Nickelodeon Asia (Available in the Philippines from 1998 to 2011)

=== Taiwan ===
- MTV Mandarin (Taiwanese Mandarin)
- Nickelodeon Asia (Taiwanese Mandarin)
- Nick Jr. Southeast Asia (Taiwanese Mandarin)

=== Thailand ===
- MTV Thailand (re-closed)
- MTV Asia (English and Thai) (closed)
- MTV Global (Thai)
- MTV Sports (closed)
- VH1 Thailand
- Nickelodeon Asia (Thai; Live Action Programming Subtitled)

=== Vietnam ===
- MTV Vietnam (closed)
- Nick & You (closed)

== Sub-Saharan Africa ==
MTV Networks started operations in Africa in 1999 with the Nickelodeon block on M-Net's K-TV then MTV Base in 2005. In 2008, Nickelodeon became a 24-hour channel. Since then the Network as expanded. Most of its channels are available exclusively on DStv.

- BET Africa (exclusive to DStv)
- BET 2 (replaced BET International on DStv in April 2015 but closed before the end of the year)
- BET International (Available to all Digital TV services except DStv)
- Comedy Central Africa (exclusive to DStv)
- MTV Base Africa (Formerly exclusive to DStv but now available to other providers.)
- MTV Africa (launched from 2013 to 2026 as MTV South Africa to replace MTV Europe. Formerly exclusive to DStv)
- Nickelodeon Global closed in Africa except South Africa (on some providers)
- Nickelodeon Asia (parts of West Africa, Central Africa, East Africa and South Africa)
- Nickelodeon (exclusive to DStv and GOtv)
- Nick Jr. (exclusive to DStv and GOtv)
- Nicktoons (exclusive to DStv and GOtv)
- VH1 Europe (exclusive to DStv until it got discontinued and replaced by VH1 Classic)
- VH1 Classic Europe (exclusive to DStv until March 4, 2019, as the channel got replaced with MTV Music 24)
- MTV Music 24 (launched on DStv in March 2019 replacing VH1 Classic, but closed on 1 June 2021 to be replaced by MTV Hits)
- MTV Hits (exclusive to DStv)
