= VH1 (Europe) =

Television channel

- Final logo used from 2020 and 2021
- Broadcast area: Europe; Latin America and Caribbean; Middle East and North Africa
- Network: MTV
- Headquarters: London, United Kingdom

Programming
- Language: English
- Picture format: 1080i HDTV (downscaled to 16:9 576i for the SDTV feed)

Ownership
- Owner: ViacomCBS Networks EMEAA
- Sister channels: MTV Global; Club MTV; MTV 80s MTV 90s MTV Hits; MTV Live

History
- Launched: June 1999; 26 years ago (as VH1 Export); 2001; 25 years ago (as VH1 Europe); 7 October 2020; 5 years ago (HD feed launch; launch in Latin America)
- Replaced: VH1 Latin America; VH1 Polska; VH1 Adria; VH1 Russia
- Closed: 2 August 2021; 4 years ago
- Replaced by: MTV 00s

Availability

Terrestrial
- Zuku TV (Kenya): Channel 775

VH1 (referred as VH1 Europe) was a European music television channel owned by ViacomCBS Networks EMEAA. It played a wide variety of music programs on a daily or weekly basis, and various VH1 original series.

The channel focused on current music, as well as music from the 2000s and the 2010s. In the 2000s, the channel used to focus on then current music – with a heavier focus on so-called adult contemporary pop and pop rock than today, – as well as music from the 1980s and the 1990s. From 2020 until the closure, the channel also played some Hip Hop hits, from artists like Roddy Ricch and DaBaby.

On 2 August 2021, the channel was replaced by MTV 00s. On 1 August - the 40th anniversary of MTV - the channel's programming was adapted to MTV 00s, where as the next day the logo and graphics were updated to MTV 00s. On the former programming, the last song broadcast on VH1 Shuffle was the 2014 single "Are You with Me" by the Belgian DJ Lost Frequencies. The last music video shown on VH1 before being replaced by MTV 00s on 2 August 2021 at 05:00 CET, was "Dani California" by Red Hot Chili Peppers.

== History ==
VH1 appeared for the first time in the UK in 1994 and Germany in 1995. The version airing in the UK was subsequently distributed across the whole of Europe as VH1 Export from June 1999. The pan-European channel was officially launched in 2001 by merging VH1 Export and VH-1 Germany, and hence becoming a separate channel from the UK-aimed VH1 channel.

VH1 Europe in 2013 was the only major music channel in Western Europe still broadcasting in the 4:3 ratio while others were broadcasting in 16:9. Since 28 May 2014, VH1 Europe was broadcasting in 16:9.

== Programming ==
This European version of VH1 was very different from its American counterpart, since it has never ceased to be a proper music channel, playing a wide variety of music programs on a daily and weekly basis. VH1 Europe was covered many styles of music through a comprehensive selection of music videos ranging from the 1970s to today, using an extensive videoshop of clips MTV Networks Europe London-based music video library.

In 2001 VH1 Europe's daily schedule included the following shows:

- Non-Stop Video Hits
- So 80s
- VH1 Pop Up Videos
- Storytellers
- VH1 Flipside.

Weekends included Special Themed Weekends such as 'Michael Jackson Weekend' (presented by a Spice Girl) and programs such as Solid Gold Hits. In 2002 VH1 Europe started broadcasting VH1 UK Album Chart presented by VJ Paul King.

VH1 Europe's regular programming featured music from 1980 onward, with some Top 50 segments including rare songs from the 1970s and 1960s. As of 2021, VH1 Europe stopped adding new songs to its regular rotation. The last newly added videos included British singer Harry Styles' single "Treat People with Kindness", "Higher Power" by Coldplay and "Cover Me in Sunshine" by Pink. In 2021, the channel's regular programming shifted to focus primarily on the 2000s, with additional shows dedicated to that era. Similar to other MTV networks, VH1 had also stopped broadcasting Michael Jackson's videos in recent years.

=== On Pan-European feed ===
Since 5 August 2010, most of the European feeds of VH1 are one common music channel which airs commercials. Starting this date, VH1 started to air the first commercial in some regions, thus following the trend of the regional resellers (cable companies) to air specific language and area commercials. The regional cover-up aspect of VH1 by this date has been less aggressive as it did not have commercial and shopping shows. The revenue came only from subscribers and since then the change in its politics means VH1 now allows third parties to overlap commercial clips with regional commercials. This increases the revenue by an additional percentage and it cannot increase the low audition percentage it has on the TV market.

=== Themed shows ===
Until early 2008, VH1 Europe's schedule was largely based upon music programming, although some shows imported from VH1 US or MTV US (including classic episodes of Beavis and Butt-Head, Pop-Up Video and The Osbournes) could be seen during primetime hours as well. In February 2008, the channel received a major makeover in its timeslot programming, with further specialist shows being added to the already existing ones, featuring selections of music videos linked by common themes (VH1 Themed, Smells Like The 90s, VH1 Pop Chart, Boogie Night, Flipside, Chill Out, So 80s, Viva La Disco, Sunday Soul, VH1 New, VH1 Rocks, Top 10, Final Countdown, Then & Now, VH1 Classic, Smooth Wake Up, Saturday Night Fever, Best Of Charts, Greatest Hits, Aerobic, Espresso, VH1 Oldschool, Cover Power...). In January 2010, the only daily hour of non-music related programming on VH1 Europe – formerly airing between noon and 1 p.m. – was replaced by music video-based programming. The channel's schedule now purely consists of music programming.

=== VH1 Jukebox ===
For 2 hours each day, between 18.00 and 20.00 CET, the channel played selections of videos submitted by viewers via the channel's website on a show called VH1 Jukebox. The show was cancelled in summer 2010.

=== Non-English music ===
Until "Despacito" acquired the status of a global mega-hit, VH1 Europe did not regularly play music sung in another language than English, but since Spanish-language música urbana became hugely popular outside of Latin America or the Latin American communities around the world in the late 2010s, the channel began to regularly play videos from artists like Luis Fonsi, J Balvin, Bad Bunny, Rosalía, Maluma, Anitta, as well Spanish songs by Shakira.

=== Last programming on VH1 ===
Prior to 5 June 2021, the channel broadcast the following series:

- [Artist]: The Hits
- Class of 2000–2019
- Guess the Year (1980–2009)
- Hits Don't Lie
- Shuffle
- Songs of the Century
- Top 50
- We Love the: 00s

After the mentioned date, the schedule has been adapted to broadcast songs from 00s era:

- 00s Power Ballads
- The 40 Greatest Hits
- [Artist]: The Hits
- Class of 2000–2009
- Crazy in Love
- Guess the Year (1980–2018)
- Hits Don't Lie
- Hottest 00s Collabs
- Hottest 00s Dance Hits
- Hottest 00s Pop Hits
- Hottest 00s R'n'B Hits
- Loudest 00s Rock Anthems
- Non-Stop Nostalgia
- Songs of the Century
- Top 50
- Shuffle
- We Love the: 00s

== Availability ==
VH1 was broadcast from MTV Networks Europe's premises in Camden Town (London, UK) to Europe, except San Marino, and covering also the Middle East and Africa. On 1 June 2010, it became officially available in Russia as well, replacing the former local version VH1 Russia. On 1 October 2012, ex-Yugoslav countries got their regional version of VH1 called VH1 Adria, which replaced the pan-European feed until 1 February 2015 at 6 AM CET, when it was replaced again by VH1 Europe. On 1 February 2017, programming of VH1 Poland were replaced with VH1 Europe's programming, then on 3 March 2020, VH1 Poland was replaced by VH1 Europe.

VH1 was available in almost every digital platform in the above-mentioned areas. VH1 covered countries from Europe, Middle East, Latin America and Africa.

The HD version of VH1 Europe began broadcasting on 7 October 2020. This signal replaced VH1 HD in Brazil and Latin America.

The SD feed of VH1 Europe received in Latin America was similar to the channel's feed that is distributed in Russia and ex-Soviet republics (that means that the special programme idents are not aired), with the difference being not airing age ratings, in compliance with Russian television laws. Meanwhile, the channel's HD feed aired in Latin America aired the same content as the main channel in Europe.

== Branding ==
On 7 October 2020 at 13:28 CET, VH1 Europe changed its on-screen graphics to graphics VH1 Italy has been used since 2018. The new slogan was "Sing It Loud".

Also, ever since the branding changed, the artist and song name info was now up for most of the duration of the song, instead of the beginning and the end only. This is much like the decade-based Now channels and Clubland TV (although these channels did also display these graphics in the larger font at the start and the end of the song).

1st logo (1995–1999)

2nd logo (1999–2004)

3rd logo (2004–2014)

4th logo (2014–2020)

5th logo (2020–2021)
