= VH1 Classic Europe =

European music television channel

- Final logo used from 2004 to 2020
- Broadcast area: Europe
- Network: MTV

Programming
- Language: English
- Picture format: 1080i HDTV (downscaled to 4:3 576i for the SDTV feed)

Ownership
- Owner: Paramount Networks EMEAA
- Sister channels: MTV Europe; Club MTV; MTV Hits; MTV Live; MTV Music; MTV Rocks; VH1 Europe

History
- Launched: 30 November 2004; 21 years ago
- Closed: 1 March 2010; 15 years ago (UK & Ireland); 5 October 2020; 5 years ago (Europe)
- Replaced by: MTV Classic (UK & Ireland); MTV 80s (Europe)

VH1 Classic Europe was a European music television channel from ViacomCBS Networks EMEAA. The channel primarily featured music videos from the 1970s through to the 2000s (decade), although rare live performances from the 1950s and 1960s could be seen as well.

== History ==
VH1 Classic was first launched in the United Kingdom on 1 July 1999 and made available from the beginning to the whole of Europe. However, the pan-European service was launched on 30 November 2004, when it became a separate feed from VH1 Classic UK. Like VH1 European, it broadcast from MTV Networks Europe's premises in Camden Town (London, UK). It was officially available to viewers all over Europe (except the UK & Ireland and Italy). Unlike VH1 Classic UK, the pan-European version of the channel was entirely devoid of advertisements, with round-the-clock music videos played out from MTV Networks Europe's comprehensive library in London.

=== Attempts to transition VH1 Classic to widescreen ===
Like the now-defunct Italian feed of MTV Classic, VH1 Classic aired in 4:3 standard definition aspect ratio. There were a few attempts to transition this channel to widescreen, but they failed due to several technical issues.

The first widescreen transition attempt happened on 19 August 2015 at 6:00 CET, which caused VH1 Classic to have severe technical issues for a minute, then it went widescreen temporarily until 6:45 CET, which the music video was abruptly changed to "The Sweet Escape" by Gwen Stefani and reverted to 4:3. The last widescreen transition attempt happened on 9 February 2016 at 7:00 CET, when a fragment of the music video of the song "I Don't Want to Miss a Thing" by Aerosmith played, but it abruptly shifted to the on-air ident instead, which also failed.

=== Closure ===
On 1 June 2020, VH1 Classic Europe cancelled Non-Stop Classics, Welcome To The Weekend, and (on Sunday morning) Keep It Classic, Instead, We Are The 80's showtimes significantly expanded. The program begun at midnight, and it ended at midday on every day of the week. On 30 June 2020 the channel cancelled We Are The 80s, and started MTV 80s Takeover. It was later announced that the channel along with the European version of MTV Rocks, would close in October 2020, and would be replaced by MTV 80s.

On 19 September 2020, VH1 Classic Europe broadcast the final episodes of Smells Like The 90s and Nothing But The 00s, and on September 18 of this year, Keep It Classic (the last music video (from not the 80's) on the channel on 19 September 2020 at 23:57 CET was the 'Thunder In My Heart' by Meck and Leo Sayer). On the night of 19–20 September 2020, VH1 Classic Europe stopped broadcasting these programs, and the showtime of MTV 80s Takeover became 24 hours in every single day (except on 5 October 2020 between midnight and 6:00 CET, whenever the channel broadcast Non-Stop 80s Hits).

The channel closed on 5 October 2020, with Born to Run by Bruce Springsteen being the last video played on the channel before being replaced with MTV 80s.

== Programmes ==
=== Collections of clips from the 20th century and the 2000s ===
- 30/25/20/15 Years Since – Greatest hits of 30/25/20/15 years ago.
- All Night Long – Music at night.
- Boogie Wonderland – Funk, disco and dance classics.
- Classic... – 30-minute music video slots dedicated to one particular artist, band or theme, often featuring lesser known videos and forgotten releases even from big name artists.
- Classic Movie Soundtracks – Music from film scores.
- Classic Power Ballads – Power ballads from the last four decades.
- Happy Mondays (early name – Memory Lane Mondays)/Timeless Tuesdays (early name – Turnback Time Tuesdays)/Wind Back Wednesdays/Throwback Thursdays/Flashback Fridays – Music on weekday afternoons.
- Keep It Classic – General music videos.
- Never Mind the Classics – General music videos.
- Non-Stop Classics (early name – All Time Hits) – General music videos.
- Nothing but Classics – General music videos.
- The Rock Show – Rock music videos from previous years.
- So Emotional – Romantic music videos.
- Totally Club Classics – Dance music videos from previous years.
- VH1 Classics – General music videos.
- VH1 Vintage – Rarely seen videos and performances from the 1950s through to the 1970s.
- Welcome to the Weekend! – Music on the weekends.
- Wake Me Up Before You Go Go (early name – Morning Hits) – Music in the morning.

=== Music videos from the 1980s ===
- The 80s at 8 – Morning music program with music videos from the 80s.
- The 80s Alternative – Alternative and obscure videos from the 80s.
- 80s Boys vs 80s Girls – Back to back videos, alternating releases from the 1980s boy artist and bands and the 1980s girl artist and bands, sometimes from the same artist.
- The 80s Chilled – Laid-back music from the 80s.
- The 80s Danced – Dance music from the 80s.
- The 80s Partied – Disco, funk and party music from the 80s.
- The 80s Popped – Pop music from the 80s.
- The 80s Rocked – Rock music from the 80s.
- The 80s Years – A selection of music videos from one particular year of the 80s.
- Hits the 80's Forgot
- Nothing but the 80s – Marathon of 80s music videos.
- We Are the 80s (early name – So 80s) – Music from the eighties.

=== Music videos from the 1990s ===
- The 90s Alternative – Alternative and obscure videos from the 90s.
- 90s Boys vs 90s Girls – Back to back videos, alternating releases from the 1990s boy artist and bands and the 1990s girl artist and bands, sometimes from the same artist.
- The 90s Chilled – Laid-back and chill-out classics from the 90s.
- The 90s Danced – Classic dance and electronic tracks from the 90s.
- The 90s Partied – Party hits from the 90s.
- The 90s Popped – Pop music from the 90s.
- The 90s Rocked – Rock music from the 90s.
- The 90s Years – A selection of music videos from one particular year of the 90s.
- Nothing but the 90s – Marathon of 90s music videos.
- Smells Like the 90s – Music from the 90s.

=== Music videos from the 2000s ===
- 00s Boys vs 00s Girls – Back to back videos, alternating releases from 2000s boy artists and bands and 2000s girl artists and bands, sometimes from the same artist.
- Nothing but the 00s (early name – Sounds of the 00s) – Music from the 2000s.

=== Other ===
- 00s vs 80s – Back to back videos, alternating releases from the 00s and 80s, sometimes from the same artist.
- 70s vs 80s – Back to back videos, alternating releases from the 70s and 80s, sometimes from the same artist.
- 80s vs 90s – Back to back videos, alternating releases from the 80s and 90s, sometimes from the same artist.
- 90s vs 00s – Back to back videos, alternating releases from the 90s and 00s, sometimes from the same artist.
- Guess the Year
