= MTV Shows =

British TV network

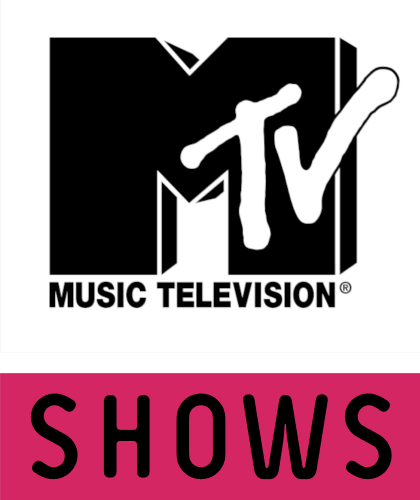
- Country: United Kingdom; Ireland

Programming
- Picture format: 576i (SDTV 4:3)

Ownership
- Owner: Viacom International Media Networks
- Sister channels: MTV; MTV Live HD; MTV Base; MTV Classic; MTV Dance; MTV Hits; MTV Rocks; VH1; Viva; Comedy Central; Comedy Central Extra; Nickelodeon; Nick Jr. Nick Jr. 2 Nicktoons

History
- Launched: 8 November 2007
- Closed: 1 February 2011
- Replaced by: MTV Music
- Former names: MTV ® (2007–2010)

Links
- Website: mtv.co.uk/channels/mtv-shows

MTV Shows (formerly MTV ®) was a British pay television channel. It was launched on 8 November 2007.

On 1 March 2010, MTV ® was rebranded to MTV Shows. MTV Shows was removed from Virgin Media on 28 August 2010, along with MTV +1 and MTV Classic, to make room for Comedy Central HD.

MTV Shows was rebranded as MTV Music on 1 February 2011.

== Programming ==
- 16 and Pregnant
- Awkward
- Brooke Knows Best
- Celebrity Deathmatch
- Date My Mom
- Dirty Sanchez
- Everybody Hates Chris
- Fur TV
- The Hills
- Hogan Knows Best
- I Love New York
- Jackass
- Laguna Beach
- Life of Ryan
- MADE
- Mr Meaty
- MTV Cribs
- My Own
- My Super Sweet 16
- Next
- Nitro Circus
- Parental Control
- Pimp My Ride
- Punk'd
- The Real World
- The Ren & Stimpy Show
- Ride with Funkmaster Flex
- Rob & Big
- Run's House
- Sanchez Get High
- Scarred
- South Park
- SpongeBob SquarePants
- Teen Mom
- Teen Mom: Young & Pregnant
- Teen Wolf
- That '70s Show
- Viva La Bam
- Wildboyz
