= MTV Classic =

MTV Classic may refer to:

- MTV Classic (American TV channel), a television channel that replaced VH1 Classic on August 1, 2016
- MTV Classic (Australian TV channel), a television channel previously named VH1 Australia until May 2010, and shut down in 2023
- MTV Classic (UK and Ireland), a television channel that replaced VH1 Classic in March 2010, and shut down in 2022
- MTV Classic (Italian TV channel), a television channel previously named MTV Gold until January 2011, and shut down in July 2015
- MTV Classic (Polish TV channel), a television channel replaced by VH1 Polska in December 2005
