= Svit+ =

- Country: Ukraine
- Broadcast area: Nationwide
- Headquarters: Kyiv, Ukraine

Programming
- Language(s): Ukrainian
- Picture format: 16:9 (576i, HDTV)

Ownership
- Owner: 1+1 Media Group

History
- Launched: 1 November 2024

Availability

Terrestrial
- Zeonbud: LCN 45 (MX-7)

Svit+ (Ukrainian: Світ+, lit. 'World+') is a Ukrainian travel and lifestyle television channel owned by 1+1 Media. The channel broadcasts reruns of The World Inside Out and other travel-related shows produced by the company, showing Ukraine and the rest of the world, as well as international lifestyle shows. The primary target is the 18-34 demographic.

== History ==
On 31 October 2023, 1+1 Media as Vision 3 won a license to operate the channel on Zeonbud's terrestrial television platform on multiplex 7. It was initially scheduled to be a female interest channel.

The National Radio and Television Council registered the license on 24 October 2024, under the definitive name of Svit+.

Broadcasts started on 1 November 2024 on the DVB-T2 LCN 45 on multiplex 7. The new channel was made available for free to operators until 1 January 2025, after which interested carriers would use the slot formerly occupied by the Ukrainian version of Comedy Central, which was set to close in 2025. Operators such as Triolan only received the channel when Comedy Central Ukraine closed.

== Programming ==
The channel initially relies on programming from 1+1 Media's back catalog, including reruns of every episode of Dmytro Komarov's The World Inside Out. As part of the launch schedule, the channel also aired reruns of the Netflix reality makeover series Dream Home Makeover originally aired on linear TV on TET. The channel plans to include foreign-made travel shows in 2025.
