= MTV (Italian TV channel) =

Television station

MTV Italy
- Country: Spain; Italy
- Broadcast area: Italy; San Marino; Vatican City
- Headquarters: Madrid, Spain

Programming
- Picture format: 1080i (HDTV)

Ownership
- Owner: Paramount Networks EMEAA
- Sister channels: Comedy Central; Nickelodeon; Nick Jr.

History
- Launched: 1 September 1997
- Founder: MTV Europe
- Closed: 1 August 2015 (DTT)
- Replaced by: TV8 (DTT)
- Former names: Rete A/MTV (1997–2000); MTV/TMC2 (2000–2001); MTV Next (2015–2016)

Links
- Website: www.mtv.it

MTV is an Italian pay television network, owned by Paramount Networks EMEAA.

== History ==
Prior to the launch of a 24-hour Italian speaking MTV, MTV viewers in Italy received the pan-European version of MTV. Regionalization of MTV in Europe began in March 1997 with the launch of a German-speaking MTV, followed by a UK branded channel in July of the same year. The Italian channel officially launched in London in September 1997, when its transmissions also entered into the television programming of Rete A.

In 2000, MTV Italy announced that its existing contract with Rete A would end and it would move to the national license used by TMC2 (acquired by Telecom Italia and formerly known as Videomusic) becoming a standalone channel the following year and getting more and more like every other "big" network in Italy, showing news, movie trailers and other things which would never have fit into the former schedules of the channel. The handover and the whole changing process was advertised with the name of "MTV Regeneration". The channel's operations moved from London to Milan.

On 5 July 2013, Telecom Italia Media announced it would be selling its 51% stake in MTV Italy to Viacom for €13.4 million. Telecom Italia Media committed to waiving its financial receivables of €9.7 million as part of the deal. The sale was completed on 12 September 2013.

On 13 June 2015, Italian newspaper La Repubblica anticipated the purchase of channel 8 occupied by MTV.

On 31 July 2015, Sky Italia took over ownership of the MTV free-to-air channel. The original MTV Italy changed its name to MTV8. On the same day, a new channel named MTV Next was launched, and then renamed MTV.

== Programming ==
Several shows were made up locally, featuring Italian music and artists. Some of the most popular shows on the channel were the Italian version of Total Request Live, LoveLine, Brand New, other are original ones like Very Victoria, Italo-Francese, Avere Ventanni and Hitlist Italia. In 2016 MTV launched successful docu-reality Riccanza on rich kids of Italy, now on its third season, and in 2018 spinoffs Richissitudes - Riccanza Francia (co-produced with MTV France), Mamma che Riccanza! (on rich mums) and Riccanza - Vita da Cani (rich dogs).

MTV Italy also shows a variety of reality shows (mainly imported from MTV US) and TV series such as Scrubs, Less than Perfect and The Office. From 1999 to 2010, the channel has shown several Japanese anime on a regular basis on the block Anime Night.

Main Italian hosts for MTV Italy were Victoria Cabello, Alessandro Cattelan, Carlo Pastore, and Elena Santarelli. Some of the former hosts of the channel are Andrea Pezzi, Camila Raznovich and Enrico Silvestrin (who are both also former MTV Europe VJs), Kris Grove, Kris Reichert, Giorgia Surina, Marco Maccarini, Paola Maugeri, Benedetta Zonca and Daniele Bossari.

== Sister channels ==
MTV had six sister channels: MTV Hits, MTV Music, MTV Classic, MTV Rocks, MTV Dance and MTV Live HD.

In the summer of 2003, MTV Italy launched two satellite channels: MTV Hits, mainly dedicated to showing chart hits and classic clips from the MTV archives and MTV Brand New, devoted to showing all the best cutting-edge, indie, electronic, metal, experimental music out there. In 2006, a fourth channel was launched: Flux, creating a whole new concept of television consisting of showing eclectic / alternative music videos 24/7 along with some artistic footages sent in by the viewers through the channel's website and other bits taken from the MTV2 US programming.

On 30 November, the Italian version of Flux, was rebranded into QOOB and on April an international website was launched. QOOB showed no commercials and was distributed through DVB-T in Italy.

In 2007, MTV Italy launched MTV Gold (hosting music from the '70s, '80s and '90s), MTV Pulse (for commercial music) and VH1 (a local version broadcast from London).

MTV+ was launched in Italy in May 2010 which broadcast a selection of music and content largely from MTV US. It was rebranded on 1 March 2011 as MTV Music, showing only music programming. The channel is exclusive to the digital terrestrial television network available in the majority of Italian homes.

On 10 January 2011, MTV Networks Italia replaced MTV Pulse and MTV Brand New with the pan-European versions of MTV Dance and MTV Rocks. MTV Gold was also rebranded as MTV Classic.
