= Khairi Fortt =

American football player and actor (born 1992)

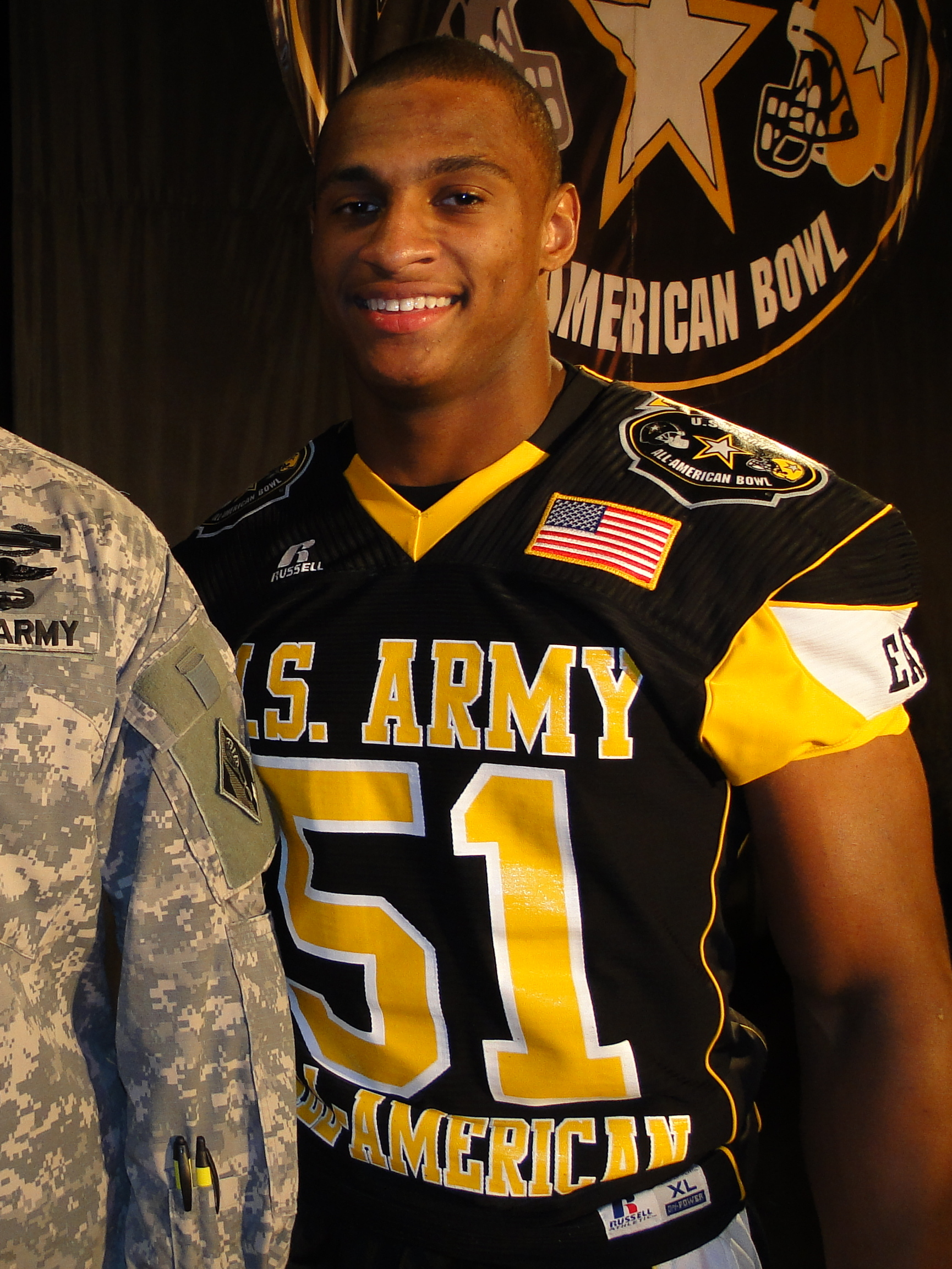
- Fortt at the 2010 U.S. Army All-American Bowl

No. 58
- Position: Linebacker

Personal information
- Born: March 24, 1992 (age 34); Washington, D.C., U.S.
- Listed height: 6 ft 2 in (1.88 m)
- Listed weight: 242 lb (110 kg)

Career information
- High school: Stamford (CT)
- College: Penn State (2010–2011); California (2012–2013)
- NFL draft: 2014: 4th round, 126th overall pick

Career history
- New Orleans Saints (2014); Cincinnati Bengals (2014); Jacksonville Jaguars (2014–2015); Seattle Seahawks (2016)*; Washington Redskins (2017)*
- * Offseason or practice squad member only

Career NFL statistics
- Total tackles: 1
- Stats at Pro Football Reference

Khairi Fortt (born March 24, 1992) is an American former professional football player who was a linebacker in the National Football League (NFL). He played college football for the Penn State Nittany Lions and California Golden Bears. He was selected by the New Orleans Saints in the fourth round of the 2014 NFL draft.

== College career ==
After being selected to play in the 2010 U.S. Army All-American Bowl, Fortt began his college career at Penn State University, then transferred to the University of California, Berkeley, after the Penn State child sex abuse scandal that resulted in extensive sanctions against the Nittany Lions program.

Fortt was a semifinalist for the Dick Butkus Award in 2013, nominating him as one of the best 12 linebackers in college football

== Professional career ==
=== New Orleans Saints ===
The New Orleans Saints selected Fortt in the fourth round of the 2014 NFL draft with the 126th overall pick. In training camp they made the decision to move him to outside linebacker and emphasize his pass rushing ability. On September 3, 2014, he was placed on the short term injured reserve list, with the possibility of returning to the active roster later in the season. However, Fortt was waived on October 6, 2014.

=== Cincinnati Bengals ===
Fortt was claimed off waivers by the Cincinnati Bengals on October 7, 2014. The Bengals cut Fortt on October 14, 2014. They signed him to the practice squad on October 16, 2014.

=== Jacksonville Jaguars ===
The Jacksonville Jaguars signed Fortt to their 53-man roster off of the Bengals practice squad on November 3, 2014. He was waived on August 29, 2015.

=== Seattle Seahawks ===
Fortt was signed by the Seattle Seahawks on May 16, 2016. He was released by the Seahawks on June 28, 2016.

=== Washington Redskins ===
On January 6, 2017, Fortt signed a reserve/future contract with the Washington Redskins. He was waived by the Redskins on May 15, 2017. During free agency, he was resigned by Washington and brought in for another tryout in D.C.

== Acting career ==
During his stint with the Redksins, Fortt starred in an episode of Discovery ID's The Perfect Murder as deceased NFL safety Sean Taylor. Fortt also was a contestant on MTV's hit show Fear Factor in 2018 hosted by American rapper and actor Ludacris, where he was victorious after three grueling challenges.
