= MTV Pulse (Italian TV channel) =

Italian TV channel

- Country: Italy

Programming
- Picture format: 576i (4:3 SDTV)

Ownership
- Owner: MTV Italy (Telecom Italia Media) 51% MTV Networks Europe (Viacom) 49%

History
- Launched: 1 October 2007; 17 years ago
- Closed: 10 January 2011; 14 years ago
- Replaced by: MTV Dance

Links
- Website: https://web.archive.org/web/20130614021432/

MTV Pulse Italy was an Italian television channel and like MTV Hits broadcast chart hits non-stop with many music-related themed zones and much programming from MTV and MTV Italy. Broadcast only on SKY Italia channel 707 (but also available on Italian IPTV services).

On 10 January 2011 MTV Pulse Italy was closed down and its frequencies were taken over by the pan-European music channel MTV Dance.

== Programming ==
- 30 minutes of
- A Shot at Love with Tila Tequila
- Clipshake
- Coffee Break
- College Rock
- Dance Hour
- Girls Rock!
- Life of Ryan
- Love Test
- Milk & Clip
- Mighty Moshin' Emo Rangers
- My Super Sweet 16
- Pimp My Ride
- Rock Hour
- TRL Italy
- TRL Top 10 Countdown
- Urban Hour
- Videorama
