= MTV Classic (Italian TV channel) =

- Country: Italy
- Broadcast area: Italy
- Headquarters: Rome

Programming
- Picture format: 576i (4:3 SDTV)

Ownership
- Owner: Viacom International Media Networks Europe
- Sister channels: MTV; MTV Dance; MTV Hits; MTV Live HD; MTV Music; MTV Rocks; Comedy Central; Nickelodeon; Nick Jr.

History
- Launched: 31 August 2007; 17 years ago
- Closed: 31 July 2015; 9 years ago
- Former names: MTV Gold (2007–11)

Links
- Website: www.mtv.it

MTV Classic was an Italian pay television channel that centred its programming schedule to former music video hits from the 1970s, 1980s and 1990s. The channel was based on the Videomusic library. It was launched on 2007 as MTV Gold, and was rebranded as MTV Classic on 10 January 2011. It was closed down on 31 July 2015, along with MTV Hits.

MTV Gold logo
