= Paramount Comedy =

Paramount Comedy may refer to the following television channels that have since been rebranded as Comedy Central.

- Comedy Central (Italy)
- Comedy Central (Russia)
- Comedy Central (Spain)
- Comedy Central (Ukraine)
- Comedy Central (UK & Ireland)
