= VH2 =

Ownership
- Owner: MTV Networks Europe

History
- Launched: 16 December 2003; 22 years ago
- Closed: 1 August 2006; 20 years ago
- Replaced by: MTV Flux

Links
- Website: www.mtv.co.uk

VH2 was a television channel that was broadcast in the United Kingdom and Ireland. It was the sister channel to VH1 and focused mainly on indie and Indie rock music. The channel targeted a 25-34 male demographic.

== History ==
On 13 November 2003, MTV Networks International announced the launch of VH2, set for 16 December. The channel was aimed at the same target audience as its sister channel, VH1, but with a greater emphasis on music videos than documentaries. During its launch, the screen identity was created by Paul Wilkinson of Nuw Creative.

The channel was added to Telewest's Active Digital cable service in April 2004. The following year, the channel was added to NTL Ireland.

On 6 July 2006, MTV Networks Europe announced that it was considering closing the channel and using its bandwidth to launch another network. The decision was put in place after the channel's main source of income, ringtone advertising, was slowing down. On 27 July, it was officially announced that a new user-generated network, MTV Flux, would replace VH2. VH2 closed on 1 August and its bandwidth was left blank until the launch of MTV Flux the following month.

== Programmes ==
In addition to airing music videos, the channel also aired documentaries about artists.

VH2 also had many chart shows, including the "Indie 500" weekend, which counted down the Top 500 Indie Songs with songs by artists such as The Stone Roses, Pixies, Oasis, Dinosaur Jr, The Cure, The Strokes, Blur and Radiohead. The winner of the Indie 500 was "There Is a Light That Never Goes Out" by The Smiths, whilst The Stone Roses' song "I Wanna Be Adored" was second (though on a condensed version of the counting listing just the top 50, the two tracks had switched place, making "I Wanna Be Adored" first place)
