= Dmytro Komarov =

Ukrainian journalist

- Дмитро Комаров
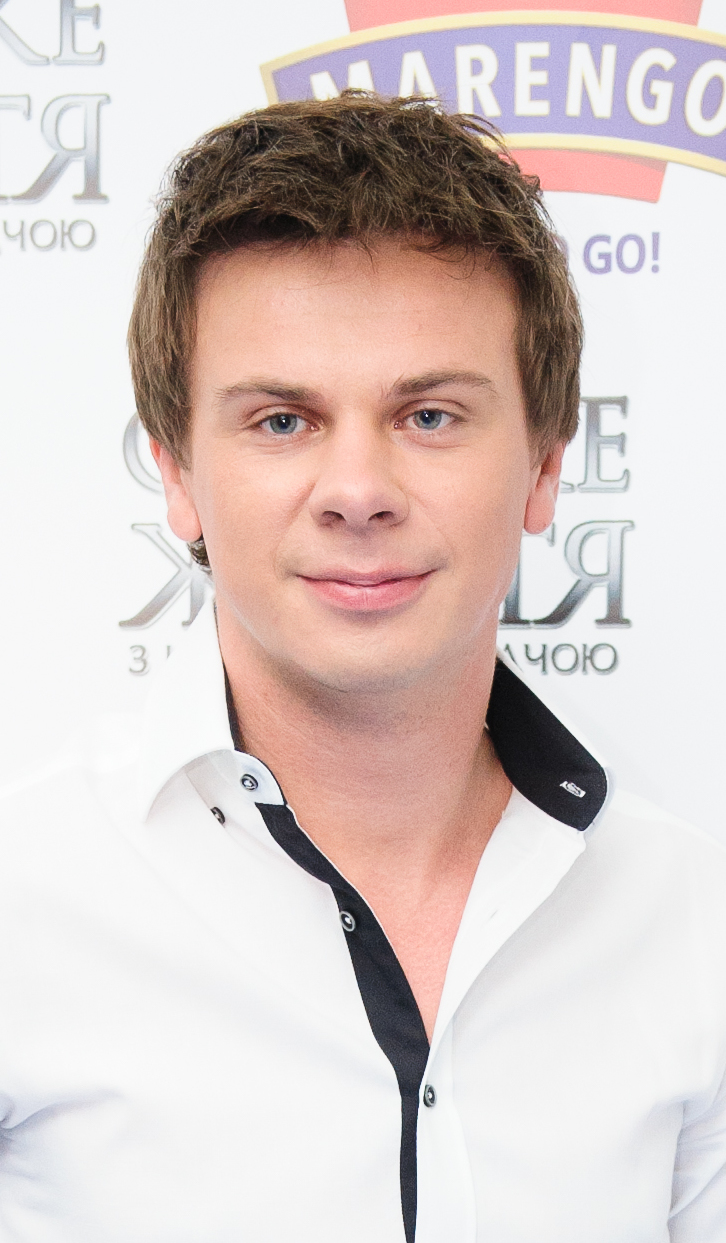
- Komarov in 2015
- Born: 17 June 1983 (age 42); Kyiv, Ukrainian SSR, Soviet Union
- Occupations: Journalist; traveler; photographer; author
- Spouse: Oleksandra Kucherenko (m. 2019; div. 2025)
- Awards: Honored Journalist of Ukraine

Dmytro Konstiantynovych Komarov (Ukrainian: Дмитро Констянтинович Комаров; born 17 June 1983) is a Ukrainian journalist, traveler, photographer, and author, host of the television program The World Inside Out. He is an Honored Journalist of Ukraine and the author of the documentary project Year.
