= MTV (Czech TV channel) =

MTV Czech Republic
- Final logo used from 1 July 2011 to 31 December 2013
- Headquarters: Prague, Czech Republic

Programming
- Picture format: 576i (SDTV 16:9)

Ownership
- Owner: CME
- Sister channels: TV Nova; Other MTV channels Nova Cinema; Nova Sport; TV Fanda

History
- Launched: 29 November 2009
- Replaced: MTV Europe
- Closed: 31 December 2013
- Replaced by: MTV Europe

Links
- Website: www.mtv.cz

MTV Czech Republic (Czech: MTV Česká republika) was a 24-hour music and entertainment television channel that served the Czech Republic and Slovakia. The channel was launched on 29 November 2009 under a licensing agreement between MTV Networks Europe, a subsidiary of MTV Networks and CME, replacing MTV Europe in Czech Republic and Slovakia, the owner of TV Nova. After being acquired by Viacom, MTV Czech was replaced by a regional version of MTV Europe serving the Czech Republic, Slovakia, Hungary and Romania at the start of 2014.
