= MTV Hits =

MTV Hits was a music video-only spin-off cable/satellite television channel of MTV in several international markets, originally based on the pop music format of a defunct programming block on the American MTV itself. The brand's last channels closed on December 31, 2025. It may refer to the following channels:

- MTV Hits (Australia and New Zealand)
- MTV Hits (United Kingdom and Ireland)
- MTV Hits (Europe, Middle East and Africa)
- MTV Hits (France)
- MTV Hits Latin America
- NickMusic, an American channel formerly known as MTV Hits from May 1, 2002 until September 9, 2016
- VH1 MegaHits, a Brazilian channel formerly known as MTV Hits from 2002 until 2010
