= Colin Griffiths =

English comedian, DJ, VJ and writer

- Born: Colin Griffiths; 16 August 1983 (age 43); Kent, England
- Occupation: Television presenter/Radio DJ/Comedian
- Website: http://www.mtvflux.co.uk

Colin Griffiths (born 16 August 1983) is an English comedian, DJ, VJ and writer. He is most famous for his work as host of the MTV show Up, Up, Down, Down... the flagship program of MTV Flux which has also aired on TMF UK and MTV UK and Ireland.

Griffiths also appeared on as a presenter and interviewer the online channel MTV Overdrive as an offshoot of his work with Up Up Down Down as well as co-hosting various "top ten" chart shows of varying themes and participating in skits for MTV's "Go Green" day. He also covered the launch of the Sony PlayStation 3 and Nintendo Wii gaming consoles for MTV, filming on location at their respective promotional shows and conducting interviews.

Griffiths also provided multiple voices for the ongoing series of animated shorts on MTV Flux called "noobs" based around conversations occurring on the MTV: Flux forums.

During the summer of 2007 he was MTV's correspondent at the Wireless Festival for MTV Flux, interviewing numerous artists including The White Stripes, LCD Soundsystem, Perry Farrell and the Klaxons.

In addition to his MTV work he also hosts a weekly radio show on Brighton's Radio Reverb along with the musician Rhys Peterson.

== Early career ==
Griffiths began his work as a broadcaster as the host of the breakfast show (and later the afternoon Drive time show) on the regional UK radio station 'Livewire' at the University of East Anglia, serving as the Deputy Station Manager of the station from 2001 to 2003, this show was also hosted with Rhys Peterson and was later moved to Brighton when the pair graduated in the form of their Radio Reverb show. As such the show has been broadcasting in one form or another since 2001.

== Later career ==
Griffiths currently works for Citizens Advice on Digital Policy. In 2017 he gave evidence on their behalf to the House of Lords Select Committee on Artificial Intelligence about the potential impact for consumers and currently sits on the UK Government's Smart Data Council
