= Comedy Central (Southeast Asia) =

Asian pay television channel

Comedy Central Asia
- Broadcast area: Southeast Asia
- Network: Comedy Central
- Headquarters: Singapore

Programming
- Picture format: 1080i HDTV

Ownership
- Owner: ViacomCBS Networks EMEAA
- Sister channels: MTV; Nickelodeon; MTV Live HD; Nick Jr. Paramount Network

History
- Launched: November 2012; 13 years ago September 2014; 11 years ago (Malaysia)
- Closed: February 2021; 5 years ago

Links
- Website: www.comedycentralasia.com

Comedy Central was a television channel owned by ViacomCBS, broadcasting in Southeast Asia and the domestic version of the international Comedy Central network.

== History ==
It was launched on November 1, 2012. The channel was first launched in Singapore, followed by other countries in Asia. The network aired most of the post-2000 programming seen on the American network, along with various other programming, both from other ViacomCBS networks and acquired through syndication. On 1 September 2014, this channel was launched in Malaysia.

The channel closed on February 1, 2021, together with MTV China.
