= QOOB =

Italian TV channel

- Country: Italy

Programming
- Language: Italian
- Picture format: 576i 4:3 SDTV

Ownership
- Owner: 51% Telecom Italia Media; 49% Viacom

History
- Launched: 30 November 2005 as XXXX; 8 April 2006 as MTV Flux
- Closed: 3 November 2009
- Replaced by: CanalOne

Links
- Website: qoob.tv

QOOB was an Italian television channel owned by MTV Italy, launched in 2005 and permanently closed in 2009.

== Content ==
Was launched in November 2005 as XXXX on Telecom Italia Media analogue television frequencies.

Broadcasting indie music videos and user-generated content, on 8 April 2006 was renamed as Flux and later, on 30 November 2006, was again renamed as QOOB.

From 1 January 2009 to 9 February 2009, Telecom Italia Media has temporarily stopped broadcasting and definitively closed on 3 November 2009.

A program called The QOOB Factory on MTV Brand New broadcast user-generated videos from QOOB website.

On 30 June 2011 QOOB was replaced by a new channel called CanalOne.
