= MTV 00s =

Defunct music television channel dedicated to music videos from the 2000s

- Final logo, used from 2021 to 2025
- Broadcast area: Australia; Europe; Latin America and Caribbean
- Network: MTV
- Headquarters: Prague, Czech Republic

Programming
- Language: English
- Picture format: 1080i HDTV (downscaled to 16:9 576i/480i for the SDTV feed)

Ownership
- Owner: Paramount Networks EMEAA
- Sister channels: MTV; Club MTV; MTV Hits; MTV Live; MTV 80s MTV 90s

History
- Launched: 2 August 2021; 5 years ago
- Replaced: VH1 Europe
- Closed: 28 April 2022; 4 years ago (Russia); 14 December 2022; 3 years ago (Belarus); 1 November 2025; 11 months ago (Australia); 31 December 2025; 9 months ago (globally)
- Replaced by: MTV 00s (Israel) (in Israel)

Availability

Terrestrial
- Zuku TV (Kenya): Channel 750

Streaming media
- Canal Digitaal Live: Watch Live

MTV 00s was a pay-TV channel owned by Paramount Networks EMEAA carrying mainly music videos from the 2000s. It was launched on 2 August 2021, replacing VH1 Europe. The channel was commercial-free.

== History ==
From 29 May to 22 June 2020, MTV OMG was temporarily rebranded to MTV 00s.

Starting from 5 June 2021, the channel VH1 Europe introduced more singles from the 00s era, and partially adapted its programming towards it. On 1 August 2021 — the 40th anniversary of MTV — VH1 Europe stopped its broadcasts and broadcast only 2000s singles under the MTV 00s name and logo. Since 2 August 2021, the channel MTV 00s broadcast round the clock, having replaced VH1 Europe.

The first music video seen was "Can't Fight the Moonlight" by LeAnn Rimes. The channel carried some songs from 1999 which charted in 2000. The channel used the "Eurostile Unicase" font for its titles and overall branding.

The channel closed in Australia on 1 November 2025.

Before the official closing date In Brazil, Claro TV+ removed MTV 00s along with its sister channels MTV Live, Nick Jr, MTV, Comedy Central, Nickelodeon, and Paramount Network on 29 December, replacing their programming with an informational slideshow.

At 07:00 CET on 31 December 2025, MTV 00s (along with MTV's other music channels) closed in the Pan-European market, with its final music video being "Bye Bye Bye" by N*Sync.

== MTV 00s (Israel) ==
MTV 00s
- Country: Israel

Programming
- Language: Hebrew
- Picture format: 16:9 576i

Ownership
- Owner: Ananey (Paramount Networks EMEAA)

History
- Launched: 1 January 2026; 9 months ago
- Replaced: MTV 00s (Europe)

MTV 00s is an Israeli music television channel, launched on 1 January 2026.

=== History ===
On 1 January 2026, after shutting down the European feed, MTV Israel launched its own local version of MTV 00s along with MTV Hits, with a minor change to the logo.
