= The World Inside Out =

Ukrainian television travel series

- Created by: Studio 1+1
- Starring: Dmytro Komarov
- Country of origin: Ukraine
- No. of series: 15
- No. of episodes: 244

Production
- Running time: 38–55 min

Original release
- Network: 1+1
- Release: 11 December 2010 – present

The World Inside Out (Ukrainian: Світ навиворіт, romanized: Svit navyvorit; Russian: Мир наизнанку, romanized: Mir naiznanku) is a Ukrainian travel television show that launched in 2010. It is hosted by Dmytro Komarov and shows locations from around the world, mainly the ones that are less visited by tourists.

== Concept ==
The idea to create his own program came to Dmytro Komarov during an independent trip to the north of Thailand in 2008. At that time he was already a fairly experienced traveler who had traveled to more than 20 countries. His independent journey across India was even included in the National Register of Records of Ukraine - he covered 20,000 km on his own in 60 days. But Komarov had no experience working on television at that time. From the age of 17 he worked as a journalist and photographer in print media (newspapers Telenedelya, Komsomolskaya Pravda, Izvestia in Ukraine, men's magazines Playboy and EGO, among others). Komarov privately prepared reports about his travels for newspapers and magazines. With his own money, he traveled to an unknown country, alone, with a camera and a laptop, and spent several months there.

Based on the results of the expeditions, he wrote media reports and held large-scale photographic exhibitions. Still in 2008, Dmytro went to study in Southeast Asia. After a trip to Cambodia, he moved to northern Thailand and spent a month exploring non-tourist settlements on the border with Burma.

The program launched less than two years after this idea. At that time, Komarov had neither television connections nor program production experience. He started with the name of the series, which he conceived in the Ukrainian mineral water resort of Skhidnitsa near Truskavets. Komarov began to pitch his business plan to Ukrainian TV channels, looking for financing, but he was refused everywhere, until he accidentally met the general director of the Citi (the current PLUSPLUS) channel and one of the producers of 1+1. He immediately realized that the project had huge potential and said he would like to see this program and what it would be like. But no one wanted to risk investing in an experience with the participation of a journalist with no television experience. Dmitry found the funds, took a chance and went to Cambodia to film a pilot project alone. Komarov was sure that he was doing a project for the capital's "Citi" channel, but after seeing the program, the producer immediately offered to put it on the group's main channel, 1+1, one of the highest rated in Ukraine.

The first season of the show was dedicated to Cambodia and consisted of 7 episodes. The cameraman was Andrey Polivany, and Dmytro Komarov combined the role of presenter, screenwriter, editor and director. Absolutely all the work on preparing the episodes was done by Dmytro together with the editing director Vitaly Naryshkin. The premiere took place on 1+1 on December 11, 2010.

From 2010 to 2022, the program was broadcast on several television channels in seven countries. Due to Russia's invasion of Ukraine, the program was no longer broadcast on Russian television. Since August 15, 2022, the program has been broadcast on the TET channel, on weekdays at 5:00 pm, with Ukrainian voice-over, sister channel 1+1 Ukraine also airs reruns. In November 2023, a new season dedicated to Ukraine was launched. A second season in Ukraine premiered in 2025 titled "What makes Ukrainians strong?".

== International distribution ==
The series was syndicated to Russia, Belarus (on Belarus-2), Israel (on the Ananey-owned Stil TV Russophone channel, Germany (on the New World channel catering the Russian diaspora), Lithuania (as part of the launch schedule of the local version of TV3 Plus in 2022), Thailand (on Amarin TV), Moldova (on Accent TV) and Latvia (on TV8).

On 4 November 2024, 1+1 Media launched its 1+1 Travel FAST channel, with separate feeds in English and Spanish. Episodes of The World Inside Out make the bulk of the schedule.
