= Comedy Central (Romanian TV channel) =

- Country: Romania
- Network: Comedy Central

Programming
- Languages: English; Romanian (subtitles)
- Picture format: 576i (SDTV)

Ownership
- Owner: Paramount Networks EMEAA

History
- Launched: 20 September 2016; 10 years ago

Links
- Website: comedycentral.com.ro

Comedy Central Romania is the Romanian version of Comedy Central. The channel broadcasts comedy oriented shows. It was launched on 20 September 2016, replacing Comedy Central Extra Adria in the country. Since then it has produced local Romanian content, and became widely popular.

== Programming ==
Shows broadcast on this channel include:

=== Current ===
- Beavis and Butt-Head
- Becker
- Beton!
- The Big Bang Theory
- Call Me Kat
- Everybody Hates Chris
- Frasier
- The King of Queens
- Mr. Bean
- The Neighborhood
- Rules of Engagement
- See Dad Run
- South Park
- Takeshi's Castle Thailand

=== Former ===
- 3rd Rock from the Sun
- Another Period
- Archer
- Big Time in Hollywood, FL
- Broad City
- Brotherhood
- Comedy Club
- Drawn Together
- Family Guy
- The Fresh Prince of Bel-Air
- Friends
- Funniest Adverts on the Planet!
- How Not to Live Your Life
- I Live with Models
- Inside Amy Schumer
- Instant Mom
- Key & Peele
- The Middle
- Mike & Molly
- Moonbeam City
- The Nanny
- Real Husbands of Hollywood
- Review
- Rick and Morty
- Ridiculousness
- Show de Seară cu Viorel Dragu
- SpongeBob SquarePants
- Tosh.0
- Two and a Half Men
- Ugly Americans
- Workaholics
- Young Sheldon
- Your Face or Mine?
