= MTV Brand New =

Ownership
- Owner: ViacomCBS Networks EMEAA

History
- Launched: 14 September 2003 (Italy); 1 August 2006 (Netherlands); 1 February 2011 (Germany)
- Closed: 10 January 2011 (Italy); 1 February 2021 (Netherlands); 6 January 2021 (Germany)

MTV Brand New was a 24-hour specialist music channel featuring new music videos, alternative and indie music available in the Netherlands, Germany. In Italy, it was replaced by MTV Rocks in 2011. The Italian version of the channel launched on 14 September 2003; it then launched in the Netherlands on 1 August 2006. The German-speaking version of the channel launched in Germany, Austria and Switzerland on 1 February 2011.

MTV Brand New hosted a showcase at the Electric Ballroom from 2011 to 2018.

MTV Brand New closed on January 10, 2011, in Italy, then in Germany on January 6, 2021, and finally in the Netherlands on February 1, 2021.

== Concept ==
MTV Brand New was derived from the hit pan-European MTV music show brand:new, which launched in 1999 on MTV's regional channels. The show was known as mtv:new on the MTV Europe, brand:neu on MTV Germany and brand:new on all other MTV channels in Europe. The show focused primarily on new music releases, music videos, introducing new artists and bands, interviews and live performances. The programme was turned into a stand-alone music channel in Italy in 2003. Since then MTV Networks Europe has begun to roll out localized Brand New channels since 2006.

== Brand: New Germany ==
MTV Brand: New was a German Pay TV channel. The channel was announced by MTV Networks Germany at the end of 2010. The channel launched on 1 February 2011. The channel was based in Berlin and featured the best in music videos from newly established German and international acts. The channel had broadcast back-to-back new music videos, the channel had also feature chart shows such as MTV Superchart. The channel ceased its broadcast and was replaced by MTV Hits on 6 January 2021.

== Yearly poll ==
Until the channels' closure, each January, MTV Brand New released a poll, listing the bands and singers that their viewers think would be the most successful during the coming year. Originally named "Spanking New", the poll was introduced in 2008, where the winners were UK band In Case of Fire. Subsequent polls have been topped by acts such as Little Boots, Justin Bieber and Conor Maynard.

In Case of Fire topped the inaugural Spanking New poll in 2008.

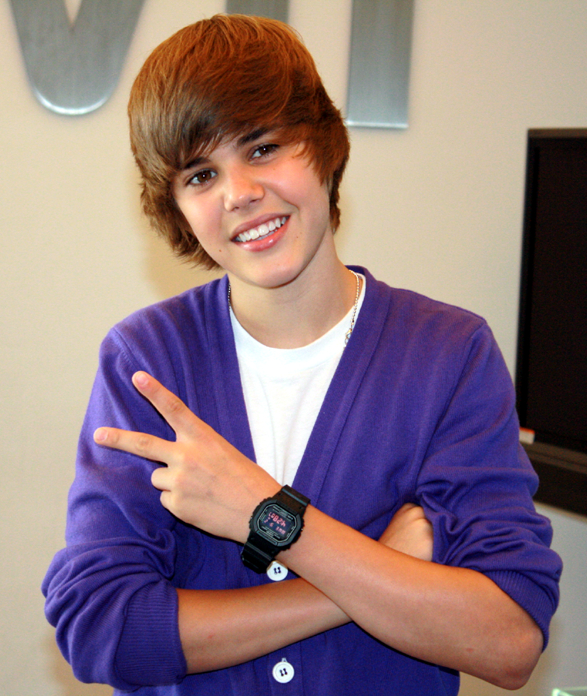
Justin Bieber topped the MTV Brand New Poll in 2010.

| Year | Artist | Top five | Ref. |
|---|---|---|---|
| 2008 | In Case of Fire | 2nd: Alphabeat; 3rd: One Night Only; 4th: Joe Lean & The Jing Jang Jong; 5th: Black Kids; 6th: Bashy; 7th: Florence and the Machine; 8th: Daniel Merriweather; 9th: Palladium; 10th: Foals | |
| 2009 | Little Boots | 2nd: Daniel Merriweather; 3rd: Julian Peretta; 4th: Lady Gaga; 5th: The Virgins; 6th: MC Rut; 7th: White Lies; 8th: Master Shortie; 9th: Kid Cudi; 10th: Dan Black | |
| 2010 | Justin Bieber | 2nd: Ellie Goulding; 3rd: Owl City; 4th: Tinie Tempah; 5th: Ke$ha; 6th: Marina and the Diamonds; 7th: Drake; 8th: Rox; 9th: Delphic; 10th: The Drums | |
| 2011 | Mona | 2nd: Jessie J; 3rd: Far East Movement; 4th: Willow Smith; 5th: Clare Maguire | |
| 2012 | Conor Maynard | 2nd: King Charles; 3rd: Lana Del Rey; 4th: Clement Marfo & The Frontline; 5th: Angel; 6th: Delilah; 7th: Charli XCX; 8th: Michael Kiwanuka; 9th: Lianne La Havas; 10th: Context | |
| 2013 | Ebony Day | 2nd: Gabrielle Aplin; 3rd: K Koke; 4th: Kodaline; 5th: Rascals | |
| 2014 | The Vamps | 2nd: Eylar Fox; 3rd: Ella Eyre; 4th: Sam Smith; 5th: Royal Blood; 6th: George Ezra; 7th: Banks; 8th: Joel Compass; 9th: Kwabs; 10th: Marie Naffah | |
| 2015 | Krept & Konan | 2nd: Saint Raymond; 3rd: Melissa Steel | |
