= VH1 (UK & Ireland) =

British & Irish version of the music television channel

- Final logo used from 1 May 2018 to 7 January 2020

Programming
- Picture format: 1080i HDTV (downscaled to 16:9 576i for the SDTV feed)

Ownership
- Owner: ViacomCBS Networks UK & Australia
- Sister channels: Club MTV; MTV; MTV Base; MTV Classic; MTV Hits; MTV Live; MTV Music; MTV OMG; MTV Rocks

History
- Launched: 30 September 1994; 31 years ago
- Closed: 7 January 2020; 6 years ago
- Replaced by: MTV Classic (Virgin Media UK)

VH1 was a British and Irish pay television channel that was owned by ViacomCBS. The channel was based on the American channel of the same name. The channel ceased broadcasting on 7 January 2020.

== History ==
VH1 UK launched on 30 September 1994 as a complementary network to the youth-orientated MTV. It originally took the same focus at launch as the main American network of a focus on mainly adult contemporary artists for an audience between 21 and 44, with a broad playlist involving music videos from the 70s to the present day along with weekly countdowns, a format maintained until around 2008.

Between 1994 and 2002 Paul King (UK) and Pip Dann (NZ), familiar faces from MTV Europe 1989–1994, were the channel's main videojockeys. Paul King hosted VH1's Album Chart Show (also broadcast on VH1 Europe in 2002) and Pip Dann had her own special shows.

Besides the American network's features and programming (including programme marathons such as Pop-Up Video), a unique feature of the network was Ten of the Best, in which an artist's video is played, then the artist's personal top ten list being played with explanations from the artists for their choices. The same concept was also carried by VH2, but with their alternative artists.

From 24 November until 26 December 2017, VH1 was renamed temporarily as VH1 Christmas.

=== Final format ===
On 1 May 2018, VH1 moved to Sky channel 174 and as a result, the channel took on a general entertainment focus, matching the American network, though due to the American VH1's programmes being licensed to other networks or broadcasters, it carried content from Channel 5 or MTV. VH1 completed its transition to a general entertainment format in October 2018 with VH1 US programs, including Love & Hip Hop: Miami and Ru Paul's Drag Race, though music programmes continued in non-prime timeslots. VH1 Christmas moved to MTV Rocks.

In March 2019, VH1, along with sister channel BET moved EPG numbers on Sky. VH1 moved to 160 and BET moved to 173, swapping places with PBS America and Together TV respectively.

In December 2019, BT TV announced that VH1 would be leaving the UK market along with Universal TV and that the channel would close on 7 January 2020, the same day as sister channel 5Spike. The EPG channel slot was pulled from all platforms except Virgin Media UK, where MTV Classic replaced it after a ten-year absence on that platform.

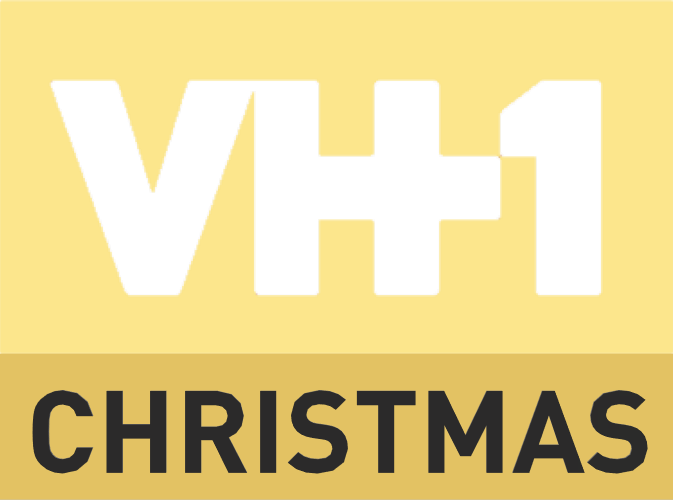
VH1 Christmas logo.

== Final programming ==
- Are You the One? (the last programme broadcast at 3.15am before the channel closed)
- Basketball Wives
- Black Ink Crew
- Cruising with Jane McDonald
- Fire Island
- The Hills
- L.A. Hair
- Love & Hip Hop: Miami
- Love & Hip Hop: New York
- The Real Housewives of Atlanta
- The Real Housewives of Orange County
- RuPaul's Drag Race
- RuPaul's Drag Race All Stars
- Snog Marry Avoid?
- Teen Mom

== Former sister channels ==
VH1 inspired two spin-off channels, both of which have since switched to MTV spin-offs:

- VH1 Classic (launched 1 July 1999; closed 1 March 2010) played all-time greats from the 1960s to the 1990s. The channel was rebranded as MTV Classic.
- VH2 (launched 16 December 2003; closed 1 August 2006) showed mainly music videos and live concerts. It focused on rock, indie and punk music and branded itself as "the alternative to manufactured pop". The channel was replaced by MTV Flux, which itself was replaced by MTV +1.

== See also ==
- VH1
