= MTV (Taiwan) =

Asian music television channel

MTV Taiwan
- Logo used since 14 September 2021
- Country: Taiwan
- Broadcast area: Chinese communities across Asia

Ownership
- Owner: Skydance
- Sister channels: MTV Asia; Nickelodeon; Comedy Central; Nick Jr.

History
- Launched: 21 April 1995 (as MTV Mandarin, now MTV Taiwan); 26 April 2003 (MTV China)
- Closed: 31 January 2021 (MTV China)

Links
- Website: www.mtv.com.tw

MTV Taiwan (formerly MTV Mandarin) is a 24-hour music channel that airs Chinese and international music programs owned by Paramount Networks EMEAA. One of the first three MTV Asia channels along with MTV Asia and MTV India. MTV Mandarin has two different feeds (Taiwan & Mainland China). The channel broadcasts in Taiwan, Hong Kong, Singapore, and Indonesia. After 18 years of broadcasting, MTV China and Comedy Central Asia ceased transmission on 1 February 2021. However, MTV Taiwan continues to broadcast.

== Operating channels ==
- MTV Taiwan - based in Taipei, co-owned and operated by Sanlih E-Television since early 2010s.

== See also ==
- MTV (Music Television)
- MTV Networks Asia Pacific
- MTV Southeast Asia
