= MTV (Asian TV channel) =

Asian music pay television channel

MTV Asia
- Country: Singapore
- Broadcast area: Southeast Asia
- Headquarters: Singapore

Programming
- Picture format: 1080i HDTV

Ownership
- Owner: Paramount Networks EMEAA
- Sister channels: Nickelodeon; Comedy Central; Nick Jr. Paramount Network; MTV Live; MTV Global; MTV 90s Colors; Colors Infinity

History
- Launched: 5 May 1995; 31 years ago (as a standalone pay-TV channel)
- Closed: 1 September 2022; 4 years ago
- Replaced by: MTV Live; MTV 90s MTV Global

Links
- Website: mtvasia.com youtube.com/mtvasia (YouTube) instagram.com/mtvasia (Instagram) twitter.com/mtvasia (Twitter)

MTV was a pan-Asian music pay television channel that was launched on 5 May 1995 as a standalone pay television service. The channel was owned by Paramount Networks EMEAA.

== History ==
=== Pre-launch ===
The first incarnation of MTV Asia was launched on 15 September 1991 as part of a joint venture between the STAR TV Network and Viacom. On 2 May 1994, MTV Asia ended its partnership with STAR TV, and the channel space was subsequently taken over by Channel V on 27 May 1994.

=== Launch ===
MTV Southeast Asia was officially launched on 5 May 1995 at 8:00 p.m. Singapore Time (SGT) as a 24-hour English-language music channel, broadcasting from Singapore and available across Southeast Asia, including territories such as Indonesia, Malaysia, and Singapore. Simultaneously, MTV Southeast Asia and its sister channel MTV Indonesia were launched via the Palapa C2 digital satellite. The channel was originally scheduled to launch in the last quarter of 1994.

Headquartered at Shenton Way, the channel operated as a joint venture with Polygram. At the time of its launch, MTV Southeast Asia had secured 31 advertisers, while its Mandarin-language counterpart had 16, generating revenues described as being in the "hundreds of thousands".

By 1997, the channel had a team of 30 video jockeys (VJs), with plans to expand the roster further.

From 1 May 2021 to 1 September 2022, MTV Southeast Asia reduced its original programming to an 8-hour block, airing from 4:00 p.m. to 12:00 midnight (SGT). During the remaining hours, from 12:00 midnight to 4:00 p.m. (SGT), the channel simulcast content from its sister network, MTV Live. This change reflected a shift in programming strategy to focus more on music content and reduce entertainment programming.

=== Closure ===
As part of a restructuring by Paramount Networks EMEAA, MTV Asia began ceasing operations in several territories. In Singapore, the channel was discontinued on StarHub TV on 29 April 2022, following StarHub's review of its content offerings and the launch of MTV Asia On Demand.

MTV Asia officially ceased broadcasting after 27 years. It was replaced by MTV Live on platforms such as Astro, Unifi TV, and I-Cable, while other providers began carrying MTV 90s. However, its digital platforms have remained operational through its official YouTube channel and various social media accounts.

== Final programming ==
=== Music video blocks ===
- Global Beats
- Hot Right Now
- High Definition Hits
- K-Wave
- MTV Musika
- MTV Rewind
- Rock Solid Playlist

=== Concert/Live performances ===
- MTV Unplugged
- MTV World Stage

== See also ==
- MTV
- MTV Mandarin (1995–2003, defunct/split)
  - MTV Taiwan (2003–, ongoing, based in Taipei, co-owned and operated by Sanlih E-Television since early 2010s.)
  - MTV China (2003–2021, defunct)
- MTV India (1996–ongoing)
- MTV Korea (2001–2022, defunct)
- MTV Pakistan (2006–2011, defunct)
- MTV Vietnam (2011–2023, defunct)
- MTV Thailand (2001–2011, 2013–2016, defunct)
- MTV Philippines (1992–2010, defunct)
  - Studio 23 (1996–1999)
  - IBC 13 (2005)
- MTV Pinoy (2014–2016, 2017, defunct)
- MTV Indonesia (1995–2012, 2014–2015, defunct)
  - ANteve (1995–2002)
  - Global TV (2002–2012)
  - CTV Banten (2014–2015)
  - RTV (2015)
- MTVph (2017–2018, defunct)
- Paramount International Networks (formerly MTV Networks Asia Pacific)
