= Kids & You =

TV block on Vietnamese TV channel YouTV

- Country: Vietnam
- Network: You TV

Programming
- Language: Vietnamese
- Picture format: 16:9

Ownership
- Owner: Paramount Networks EMEAA; International Media Corp
- Sister channels: Nick Jr. Vietnam

History
- Launched: September 15, 2016
- Former names: Nick & You (2016–23)

Links
- Website: youtv.vn

Kids & You, formerly Nick & You, is a two-hour children's block that airs on the Vietnamese TV channel YouTV (Hanoicab 2).

The block first launched on September 15, 2016. The block features programming from the children's TV channel, Nickelodeon dubbed into Vietnamese. On January 1, 2023, the block was closed and replaced by Kids & You.
