= MTV 90s =

Defunct worldwide music channel from MTV

- Final logo, used 2022 to 2025
- Broadcast area: Australia; Europe, Middle East and North Africa; Southeast Asia
- Network: MTV

Programming
- Language: English
- Picture format: 1080i HDTV (downscaled to 480i/576i for the SDTV feed)

Ownership
- Owner: Paramount International Networks
- Sister channels: MTV; Club MTV; MTV Hits; MTV Live; MTV 80s MTV 00s

History
- Launched: 5 October 2020; 6 years ago (Europe, Middle East and North Africa); 1 March 2021; 5 years ago (MENA); 1 September 2022; 4 years ago (Southeast Asia)
- Replaced: MTV Rocks (Europe); MTV Music 24 (Netherlands); MTV (Southeast Asia); MTV Base (UK & Ireland)
- Closed: 28 April 2022; 4 years ago (Russia); 14 December 2022; 3 years ago (Belarus); 1 January 2025; 21 months ago (Netherlands); 1 November 2025; 11 months ago (Australia); 31 December 2025; 9 months ago (globally)

Availability

Terrestrial
- Zuku TV (Kenya): Channel 749

MTV 90s was an international music television channel from Paramount International Networks that played music videos from 1990 until 1999. The channel was available in Europe, the Middle East, North Africa, and parts of Southeast Asia (excluding Malaysia), and was a commercial-free network.

== History ==
=== 2016 pop-up channel ===
From 27 May to 24 June 2016, MTV 90s was originally broadcast as a temporary pop-up channel in the United Kingdom and Ireland, which it replaced MTV Classic during that time period. The idents and promos from the pop-up channel would later be reused four years later, when MTV 90s was launched as a standalone channel in Europe on 5 October 2020.

=== History ===
MTV 90s was launched as a dedicated channel in Europe on 5 October 2020 at 05:00 CET, replacing MTV Rocks.

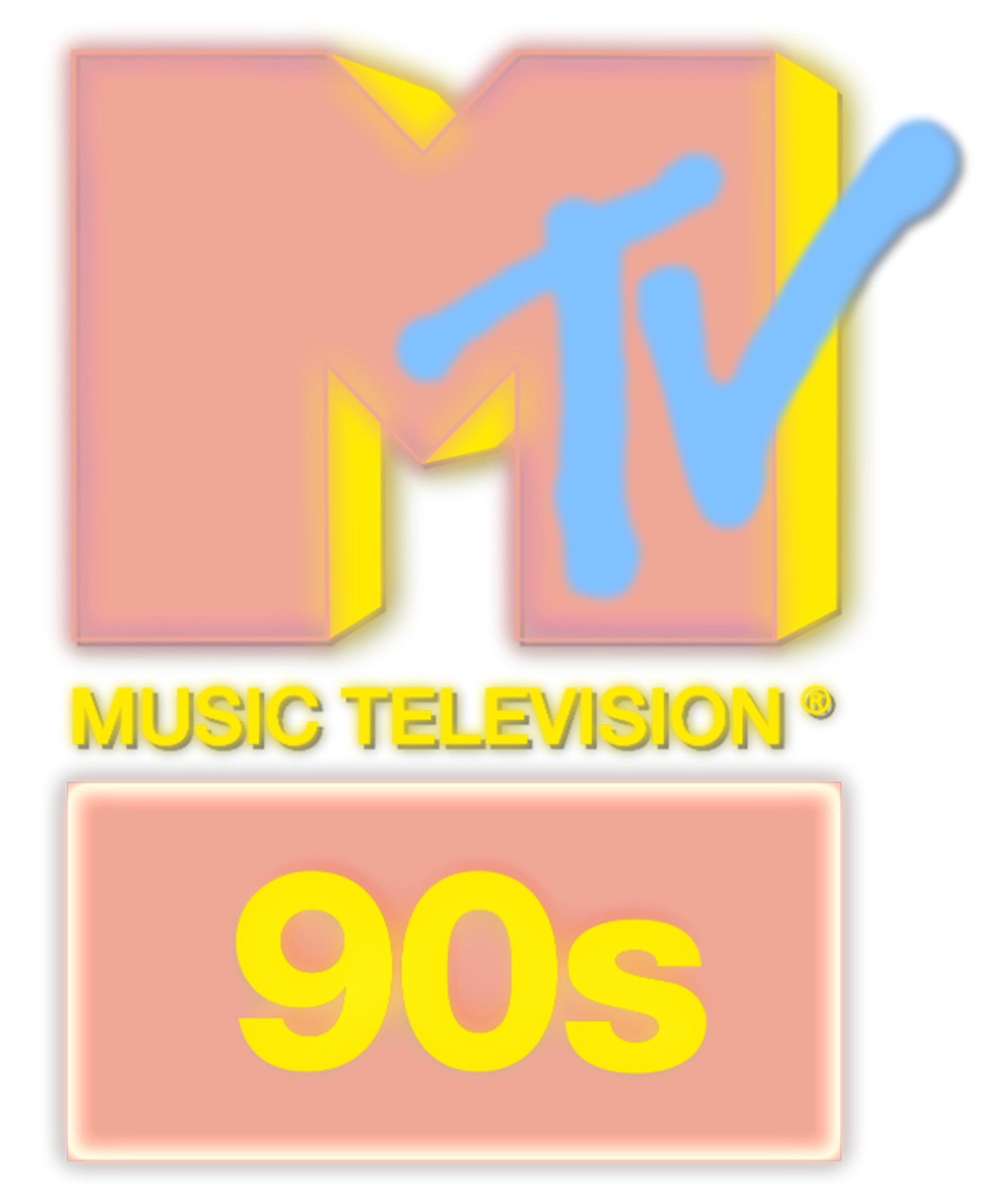
Former MTV 90s logo used 2020 to 2022

On 1 March 2021, MTV 90s expanded its broadcast area to the Middle East and North Africa via beIN Channels Network.

On 26 May 2021, MTV 90s was launched in the Netherlands, replacing MTV Music 24. The channel ceased distribution in the Netherlands on 1 January 2025.

As part of restructuring at Paramount Global UK & Australia, MTV Base was replaced by MTV 90s in the United Kingdom and Ireland from 31 March 2022, and replaced MTV Asia on 1 September 2022.

The channel does carry some songs from 1989 which did chart instead in 1990.

The channel closed in Australia on 1 November 2025.

At 07:00 CET on 31 December 2025, MTV 90s (along with MTV’s other music channels) closed in the Pan-European market, with its final music video being "Goodbye" by the Spice Girls.
