= MTV 80s =

Defunct worldwide music channel from MTV

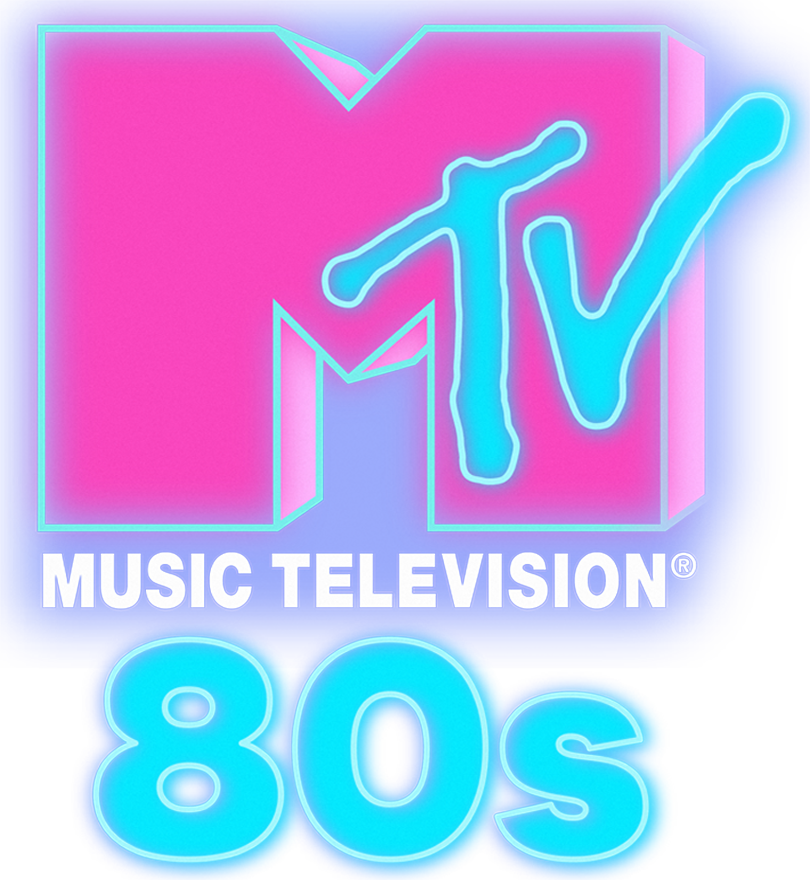
- Final logo, used from February to December 2025
- Broadcast area: Australia; Europe, Middle East and North Africa; Latin America and Caribbean; New Zealand
- Network: MTV

Programming
- Language: English
- Picture format: 1080i HDTV (downscaled to 480i/576i for the SDTV feed)

Ownership
- Owner: Paramount International Networks
- Sister channels: MTV; Club MTV; MTV Hits; MTV Live; MTV 90s MTV 00s

History
- Launched: 1 July 2020; 6 years ago (New Zealand); 5 October 2020; 6 years ago (Europe, Latin America and the Caribbean); 1 March 2021; 5 years ago (MENA); 1 August 2023; 3 years ago (Australia)
- Replaced: VH1 Classic Europe (Europe); MTV Classic (Australia & New Zealand)
- Closed: 28 April 2022; 4 years ago (Russia); 14 December 2022; 3 years ago (Belarus); 1 November 2025; 12 months ago (Australia); 1 December 2025; 11 months ago (New Zealand); 31 December 2025; 10 months ago (globally)

MTV 80s was a channel featuring music videos from the 1980s. It had a commercial-free schedule.

== History ==
=== Pop-up channel and launch ===
From 28 February to 31 March 2020, MTV 80s was broadcast for one month as a themed alternative to its host channel, MTV Classic UK, but was not planned as a full-time replacement. From 30 June 2020, until 5 October 2020, VH1 Classic Europe broadcast a block of MTV 80s programming from midnight until midday as a test bed for what would eventually become the permanent replacement to VH1 Classic Europe.

Former MTV 80s logo used 2020 to 2025

MTV 80s broadcast around the clock in New Zealand since 1 July 2020 and Australia since 1 August 2023 replacing MTV Classic. On 5 October 2020, from 05:00 CET onwards, MTV 80s started broadcasting full-time, replacing VH1 Classic in Europe, Latin America and the Caribbean.

=== Closure ===
The channel closed in Australia on 1 November 2025.

On 31 December 2025, MTV 80s, along with MTV's other international music channels, closed globally due to the company's restructuring policy. The last video played was "Together in Electric Dreams" by Philip Oakey and Giorgio Moroder before the channel's closing at 7:00 AM CET.

== Other versions ==
As part of restructuring at Paramount Global UK & Australia, MTV 80s replaced MTV Classic in the UK from 6am on 31 March 2022.
