= VH1 Italia =

Italian Television Channel

- Country: Italy
- Broadcast area: Italy; Switzerland
- Headquarters: Italy

Programming
- Language: Italian
- Picture format: 576i (SDTV); 1080i (HDTV)

Ownership
- Owner: Paramount Networks EMEAA
- Sister channels: MTV; MTV Music; Comedy Central; Nickelodeon; Nick Jr.

History
- Launched: 1 July 2016; 10 years ago
- Replaced: MTV Music (terrestrial television only)
- Closed: 7 January 2024; 2 years ago

Availability

Terrestrial
- Mux TIMB 3: Channels 167 (SD)

VH1 Italia was a 24-hour music entertainment channel operated by Paramount Networks EMEAA which launched on 1 July 2016, replacing the Italian version of MTV Music which launched on 1 March 2011 on digital terrestrial television. VH1 Italia was available over-the-air across Italy.

The channel used the slogan 'Music 4 Life' on all online and on-air branding. The channel used the existing VH1 branding and idents from VH1's international creative campaign. The channel used a mix of domestic and non-domestic music videos and artists. Italian artists were used in segments in order to promote the new channel - VH1 Italia: Music 4 Life. The network retained the music video direction of the original VH1 format, never moving its focus towards the American channel's reality television focus.

The channel ceased broadcasting on 7 January 2024.

== Logos ==
1st logo (2016-2018).

Final logo (2018-2024)

== See also ==
- MTV Global
- Paramount Networks EMEAA
