= MTV Brand New (Italian TV channel) =

Defunct Italian television channel

- Country: Italy

Programming
- Picture format: 576i (4:3 SDTV)

Ownership
- Owner: MTV Italy (Telecom Italia Media) 51% MTV Networks Europe (Viacom) 49%

History
- Launched: 14 September 2003; 22 years ago
- Closed: 10 January 2011
- Replaced by: MTV Rocks

Links
- Website: http://www.mtvbrandnew.it/

MTV Brand New was an Italian television channel which played mainly indie music videos with many music-related themed zones and some productions from MTV USA like Beavis and Butt-Head, subtitled in Italian. It was broadcast only on SKY Italia channel 706 (available also on Italian IPTV services).

The channel was replaced by MTV Rocks on 10 January 2011.
