= MTV 90s (United Kingdom and Ireland) =

British and Irish TV channel

- Final logo used from 31 March 2022 to 31 December 2025
- Broadcast area: United Kingdom; Ireland
- Network: MTV

Programming
- Language: English
- Picture format: 16:9 576i SDTV

Ownership
- Owner: Paramount Networks UK & Australia
- Sister channels: MTV; MTV 80s Club MTV; MTV Live; MTV Music

History
- Launched: 27 May 2016 (as a temporary rebrand of MTV Classic); 31 March 2022; 3 years ago (as a channel)
- Replaced: MTV Base
- Closed: 31 December 2025; 46 days ago (as a channel)

MTV 90s was a British pay television music channel owned by Paramount Networks UK & Australia that launched on 31 March 2022 replacing MTV Base. It was first launched as a temporary rebrand of MTV Classic from 27 May to 24 June 2016. It was temporarily replaced by MTV Xmas in the run up to and throughout Christmas each year.

The channel closed on 31 December 2025. The last song was Goodbye, performed by Spice Girls.

== International version ==
In 2020, MTV 90s began broadcasting. The international version of the channel is registered with broadcasting regulators in Czech Republic.

== Broadcasting ==
=== Satellite ===
- Sky UK: Channel 352

=== Cable ===
- Virgin Media: Channel 283

== Temporary rebrands ==
- MTV Pride: From 27 June to 4 July 2022. A first temporary rebrand of MTV 90s due to the closure of MTV Classic. It returned in 2023.
- MTV Xmas: From 7 November to 27 December 2022. It returned in 2023 and in 2024, and for the final time on 3 November 2025.
