= MTV Music (Italy) =

Italian television channel

Programming
- Picture format: 576i (SDTV)

Ownership
- Owner: Paramount Networks EMEAA
- Sister channels: MTV; Comedy Central; Nickelodeon; Nick Jr.

History
- Launched: 17 May 2010; 16 years ago
- Closed: 1 July 2016; 10 years ago (DTT only); 31 December 2025; 7 months ago
- Replaced by: VH1 (DTT only)
- Former names: MTV+ (2010–2011)

MTV Music was an Italian pay television music channel operated by Paramount Networks EMEAA. it was launched in May 17, 2010 until December 31, 2025,

The channel was launched as a free-to-air network on Italy DTT on 17 May 2010 and on Sky Italia on 18 October 2010. It was renamed MTV Music on 1 March 2011.

The channel closed to Digital Terrestrial Television (DTT) customers on 1 July 2016. A localised VH1 feed was launched as a replacement.

The channel fully closed on 31 December 2025 as part of budget cuts made by Skydance. It was removed from the Sky Italia EPG on 5 January 2026.
