= MTV Flux =

- MTV Flux logo

Ownership
- Owner: MTV Networks Europe

History
- Launched: 6 September 2006
- Replaced: VH2
- Closed: 1 February 2008
- Replaced by: MTV One +1 (UK)

Links
- Website: www.mtv.co.uk/mtvflux

MTV Flux was a television channel in the United Kingdom and Ireland. The version in the UK and Ireland launched on 6 September 2006. The brand started as a website on 1 August. It used bandwidth that was originally used to broadcast VH2. There is an MTV 'Flux' channel in Japan, which launched in 2007.

Unlike VH2, which focused mainly on indie music, MTV Flux broadcast a wider range of music, music videos, and music-related programming, with styles ranging from current chart hits to classic pop/rock songs. The idea of the channel was to give viewers "control" by allowing them to send in video clips to the website and the TV channel if approved by the online community and (for television broadcast).

== Shows ==
The first show broadcast on MTV Flux was Up, Up, Down, Down... (short for the complete Konami Code which serves as its full official title), an hour-long show, hosted by Colin Griffiths nominally about computer games interspersed with music videos and user-submitted content.

Other shows included:

- Fan Clash: an interactive show where fans of bands compete head-to-head for the coveted 'Snart'.
- Flux Me I'm Famous: A mixture of shoutouts where members of the public throw to their own flux profiles and advertise themselves, user generated films and music videos.
- The Great MTV Flux Run (summer 2007): an interactive sports show hosted by Rob Petit.
- Obsession Session: Dedicated fans tell all about themselves and the bands they adore.
- Pod Stars: The zen den where celebrities hang out and do anything in the Flux Pod, an inflatable white enclave. Followed by their music videos.

== Website ==
The now defunct MTV Flux website allowed users to register and create a unique web page in the style of social networking sites like MySpace. This page also allowed users to create avatars as well as upload pictures and video.

== Closure ==
On 21 January 2008 AGB Nielsen Media Research announced for BARB subscribers that MTV Flux would be rebranded as MTV One +1 on 1 February 2008. MTV Flux ceased at 6am with MTV One +1 launching at 12noon on the same day.
