= Comedy Central (Ukraine) =

Former Ukrainian version of Comedy Central

- Country: Ukraine
- Broadcast area: Nationwide
- Headquarters: Kyiv

Programming
- Language: Ukrainian
- Picture format: 576i

Ownership
- Owner: 1+1 Media Group (Vision Media LLC)

History
- Launched: 22 November 2017; 8 years ago
- Closed: 1 January 2025; 20 months ago
- Former names: Paramount Comedy (2017–2023)

Links
- Website: paramountcomedy.com.ua

Comedy Central was a Ukrainian youth entertainment channel, acting as the local version of the American channel of the same name. The channel started broadcasting in November 2017 as Paramount Comedy.

== History ==
In November 2017, 1+1 Media announced that it had acquired the local license of Paramount Comedy from Viacom. Regarding the language of the channel, Oksana Petryshyn was working for the service to operate 100% in Ukrainian. The license stipulated 12 hours of local programming (including an hour a day of original content) and 12 hours of foreign content, mainly American series dubbed in Ukrainian. Test broadcasts started on the Astra 4A satellite on 3 October 2017 from 1+1 Media's uplink station using Verimatrix encryption. As of November, the group didn't make an official statement on the tests. On 22 November, test broadcasts of the Ukrainian version started on Lanet Network's cable system.

In the period between the second half of December 2017 and the first half of January 2018, 1+1 Media started regular broadcasts of Paramount Comedy Ukraine and the channel was made available on the following operators: 18 December 2017 on Kyivstar (Domashnye TV package);, in early January 2018 on Viasat Ukraine;, 1 January 2018 on Misto-TV; 2 January 2018 on Triolan; 5 January 2018 on Xtra TV (removed on 1 March 2019, returned on 12 January 2021); and 10 January 2018 on Volia.

The channel started its official website on 22 June 2018, in accordance with the demands of both 1+1 Media and Viacom.

From 28 February to 31 May 2022, the channel broadcast the United News Marathon uninterruptedly. On 1 June 2022, the channel resumed regular programming.

On 1 March 2023, the channel was renamed to Comedy Central. Its first premiere under the new name was the new season of Beavis and Butt-Head that premiered in the United States the previous year.

The channel closed on 1 January 2025.

== Programming ==
All of the programming was dubbed in the Ukrainian language by Studio 1+1 and Tak Treba Production. The bulk of the foreign output consisted largely of American shows from the Paramount back catalog, as well as some shows from other American production companies.
