= MTV Classic (UK and Ireland) =

- Final logo, used from 2021 to 2022
- Country: United Kingdom
- Broadcast area: United Kingdom, Ireland
- Network: MTV UK
- Headquarters: London, United Kingdom

Programming
- Language: English
- Picture format: 16:9 576i SDTV

Ownership
- Owner: Paramount Networks UK & Australia
- Sister channels: MTV; MTV Base; MTV Hits; MTV Music; MTV Live

History
- Launched: 1 July 1999
- Replaced: VH1 (Virgin Media UK)
- Closed: 31 March 2022; 4 years ago
- Replaced by: MTV 80s
- Former names: VH1 Classic (1999–2010)

MTV Classic was a British pay television music channel from Paramount Networks UK & Australia. The channel was launched in the United Kingdom and Ireland on 1 July 1999 as VH1 Classic.

It focused on music videos and music specials from the 1960s onwards, sometimes featuring music videos and concert footage from as early as at least the 1940s or 1950s, such as Bing Crosby's "White Christmas" from 1942. It also aired videos from the 2000s and early 2010s. Every November and December from 2013 until 2021, MTV Classic played Christmas-themed music branded as MTV Xmas.

"Video Killed the Radio Star" by The Buggles, the first video to air on the original MTV in 1981, was also the first music video to be played when the channel was rebranded as MTV Classic on 1 March 2010.

== History ==
Viacom announced the creation of three new channels for Sky Digital in 1999: VH1 Classic, MTV Base and MTV Extra.

Since the rebrand, Viacom had rebranded other international channels as MTV Classic. On 1 May 2010, VH1 Australia was rebranded as MTV Classic and on 10 January 2011, MTV Networks Europe launched an Italian version of the same channel, replacing MTV Gold.

MTV Classic began broadcasting in widescreen on 6 March 2012.

== Closure ==
On 31 March 2022, the channel closed down on all platforms, and was replaced by MTV 80s. The final video played on the channel was "Goodbye" by Spice Girls.

=== Pluto TV revival ===
In late 2022 a feed of archive music videos, listed on the guide under the MTV Classic name, was made available on the British iteration of Paramount Global's streaming television platform Pluto TV, following shortly after the addition of other MTV-branded music video streams (film soundtrack stream MTV Movie Hits and seasonal pop-up MTV Xmas) to the lineup. The Pluto streams are available at no cost to users and are separate to the MTV broadcast TV channels.

== Programming ==
- (artist): 100% Classics
- (artist): Brand New Vid
- (artist): The Hits
- 15 Years Since...
- Every Number One of the... (00s, 80s, 90s, etc.)
- Goodbye MTV Classic
- Happy Birthday (artist)! 40 Greatest Hits
- Hit Shuffle
- Keep It Classic
- Mama We Love You: Top 20
- MTV Classic's 100 Most Played Vids... Ever
- Non Stop (70s, 80s, 90s, 00s) Hits
- Pop Star Mums: Top 20!
- Official Rewind Chart: (month and year)
- Wake Up... in the (70s, 80s, 90s, 00s)

== Temporary rebrands ==
Viacom occasionally rebranded MTV Classic to a different name to air different kinds of music.

- MTV Xmas: From 23 November to 27 December 2013, the channel was temporarily rebranded as MTV Xmas, playing only Christmas-themed music. This has been repeated every year since. After 7 years since its first launch on Sky, MTV Xmas is now also available for the first time on Virgin Media UK starting 12 November 2020 as a replacement of VH1 Christmas. From 7 November 2022, MTV Xmas moved to MTV 90s due to closure of MTV Classic.
- MTV Summer: From 1 to 31 August 2014, the channel was temporarily rebranded as MTV Summer, playing only summer-themed music. This has been repeated from 29 June to 3 August 2015, replacing MTV Pride.
- MTV Love: From 29 January to 16 February 2015, the channel was temporarily rebranded as MTV Love, playing only love songs. This temporarily rebranded channel was used as a replacement for Viva until the rebrand to MTV OMG in March 2018.
- MTV Pride: From 27 to 29 June 2015, the channel was temporarily rebranded as MTV Pride to coincide with Pride Weekend in celebration of diversity and equality which celebrated LGBT life by playing gay music icons from the likes of Madonna, Kylie Minogue, Lady Gaga, Britney Spears, Cyndi Lauper, Donna Summer, Cher and Pink. This was replaced by MTV Summer on 29 June 2015 and was repeated from 24 to 27 June 2016. MTV Pride was moved to MTV OMG from 2018 to 2020 and returned from 6 to 13 September 2021. From 27 June 2022, MTV Pride was moved the new MTV 90s as the first temporary rebrand of the 90s channel.
- MTV 90s: From 27 May to 24 June 2016, the channel rebranded as MTV 90s playing 90s music videos and select Nickelodeon shows from the 90s like Clarissa Explains It All and Kenan & Kel (both of which currently air on Trace Vault). The channel was permanently launched in Europe on 5 October 2020 replacing MTV Rocks. The channel officially launched as of 31 March 2022 replacing MTV Base.
- MTV 80s: From 28 February to 31 March 2020, the channel rebrand as MTV 80s playing 80s music videos similar to MTV 90s and the decade-themed Now channels. The channel was permanently launched in New Zealand on 6 July 2020 replacing the Australian version of MTV Classic and later in Europe on 5 October 2020 replacing VH1 Classic Europe. The channel officially launched permanently to the UK as of 31 March 2022.

== Availability ==
The channel used to be available in the United Kingdom on Sky, Virgin Media, BT TV and TalkTalk Plus TV and in Ireland on Sky Ireland and Virgin Media Ireland.

MTV Classic was previously available on Virgin Media UK but it was removed from the platform on 28 August 2010, along with MTV +1 and MTV Shows, to make room for Comedy Central HD It returned to the platform on 7 January 2020 as a replacement for VH1 which had closed that day.

== Logos ==
VH1 Classic logo used from 30 November 2004 to 1 March 2010.

The first logo of MTV Classic used from 1 March 2010 to 1 July 2011.

Second logo used from 1 July 2011 to 1 October 2013.

Third logo used from 1 October 2013 to 5 April 2017.

Fourth logo used from 5 April 2017 to 14 September 2021.

Fifth and final logo used from 14 September 2021 – 31 March 2022.

MTV Xmas logo.

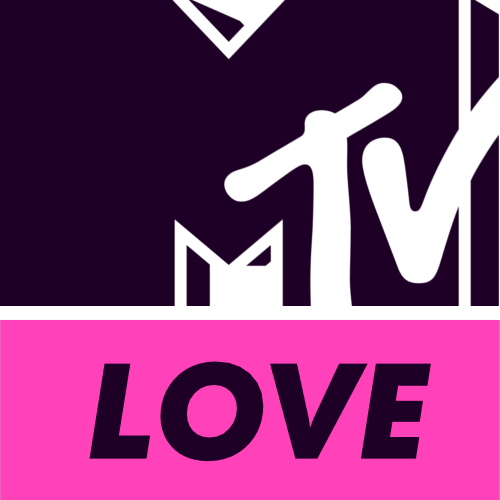
MTV Love logo

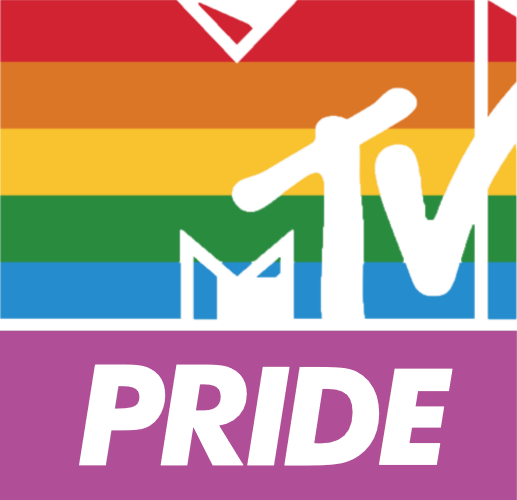
MTV Pride logo

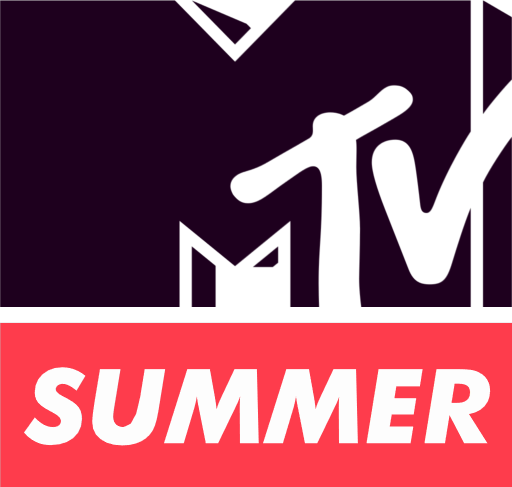
MTV Summer logo

MTV Classic's on-air identity was similar to MTV's international identity. MTV Classic utilised the new MTV logo along with specially commissioned idents by ICC. These idents were also used on other MTV Classic channels around the world including MTV Classic Australia, which launched in May 2010. On September 14, 2021, MTV Classic revealed a new on-air look and new logo as part of MTV's 2021 global rebrand.

== See also ==
- MTV UK
- MTV Base
- MTV Dance
- MTV Hits
- MTV Live
- MTV Music
- MTV Rocks
- VH1
