= MTV Hits (Europe, Middle East and Africa) =

Defunct music television channel

- Final logo, used from 2021 to 2025
- Broadcast area: Europe, Middle East and North Africa; Latin America and Caribbean
- Headquarters: London, United Kingdom

Programming
- Language: English
- Picture format: 576i (SDTV)

Ownership
- Owner: Paramount Networks EMEAA
- Sister channels: MTV · Club MTV · MTV Live · MTV 80s · MTV 90s · MTV 00s

History
- Launched: 27 May 2014; 12 years ago 3 October 2017; 9 years ago (Hungary); 5 August 2020; 6 years ago (Latin America and the Caribbean); 6 January 2021; 5 years ago (Germany); 1 February 2021; 5 years ago (Netherlands; relaunch); 1 March 2021; 5 years ago (Middle East and North Africa); 1 June 2021; 5 years ago (Sub-Saharan Africa); 1 August 2023; 3 years ago (Australia); September 2023; 3 years ago (New Zealand)
- Replaced: MTV Hits UK (in Europe); VIVA Hungary (in Hungary); MTV Brand New (in Benelux and Germany); MTV Music 24 (in Sub-Saharan Africa)
- Closed: 17 November 2015; 10 years ago (France); 1 October 2017; 9 years ago (Netherlands; original); 1 July 2021; 5 years ago (Russia and ex-Soviet states (except the Baltics and Ukraine)); 1 November 2022; 3 years ago (Sub-Saharan Africa); 1 January 2025; 21 months ago (Netherlands; relaunch); 1 November 2025; 11 months ago (Australia); 1 December 2025; 10 months ago (New Zealand); 31 December 2025; 9 months ago (globally)
- Replaced by: MTV Hits (France) (in France); Music Hits (in Poland); Music Box Hits (some CEE countries); MTV Hits (Israel) (in Israel)

MTV Hits was a pan-regional pay television music video channel operated by Paramount Networks EMEAA, focusing on contemporary pop videos from the 2010s onward. It launched for EMEA on 27 May 2014 as part of a shift from UK-branded feeds to EMEA versions. In October 2025, reports indicated that several MTV-branded music channels in Europe switched off on 31 December 2025.

== History ==
On 27 May 2014, international versions of MTV Hits, MTV Dance and MTV Rocks launched across continental Europe, replacing previously distributed UK feeds and removing UK advertising windows. The pan-regional distribution operated under Czech licences issued by RRTV to MTV Networks sro. Later that year, Viacom International Media Networks moved channel distribution licences from the Czech Republic to the Netherlands. In certain markets, the pan-regional feed carried local insertions for advertising and teleshopping slots.

On 17 November 2015, The channel ceased broadcasting in France and was merged by their channel's regional feed.

In the Benelux, carriage ended on 1 October 2017, returned in Belgium and the Netherlands on 1 February 2021, replacing Dutch feed of MTV Brand New. It was withdrawn again in the Netherlands on 31 December 2024.

In Hungary, following the closure of VIVA Hungary in October 2017, MTV Hits replaced it on most platforms.

In Germany, on 6 January 2021, MTV Brand New was replaced by MTV Hits.

MTV’s Russian operations were wound down on 1 July 2021, which included the domestic MTV Hits service, MTV Hits ceased broadcasting in Russia.

On 1 June 2021, on DStv in Sub-Saharan Africa, channel 323 switched from the EMEA feed of MTV Music 24 to MTV Hits, before being removed from the platform on 31 October 2022.

On 14 April 2025, MTV Hits refresh the programming schedule after the UK feed close down and added back the "Totally 10's" music block.

The channel closed in Australia on 1 November 2025.

At 7:00 AM CET On 31 December 2025, MTV Hits closed globally due to the company's restructuring policy. The final music video that played on this channel was Diamonds by Rihanna.

== MTV Hits (Israel) ==
MTV Hits
- Country: Israel

Programming
- Language: Hebrew
- Picture format: 16:9 576i

Ownership
- Owner: Ananey (Paramount Networks EMEAA)

History
- Launched: 31 December 2025; 9 months ago
- Replaced: MTV Hits (Europe)

MTV Hits is an Israeli music television channel, launched on 31 December 2025.

=== History ===
Minutes after shutting down the European feed, MTV Israel launched its own local version of MTV Hits along with MTV 00s, with a minor change to the logo only for MTV 00s.

== Logos ==
Logo used 27 May 2014 to 4 April 2017

Logo used 5 April 2017 to 14 September 2021

Logo used 6 January to 14 September 2021 (Germany & Netherlands)

Final Logo used 14 September 2021 to 31 December 2025
