= MTV Live (international TV channel) =

Defunct international version of MTV Live

- Final logo, used from 2021 to 2025
- Country: United Kingdom
- Broadcast area: Worldwide (selected markets)
- Headquarters: 17-29 Hawley Crescent NW1 8TT London, United Kingdom

Programming
- Language: English
- Picture format: 1080p HDTV

Ownership
- Owner: Paramount Networks EMEAA
- Sister channels: List: MTV MTV Hits Club MTV MTV Music MTV 80s MTV 90s MTV 00s

History
- Launched: 15 September 2008; 18 years ago
- Replaced: MTV Middle East; MTV Asia; MTV Russia (CIS)
- Closed: 9 April 2013; 13 years ago (France); 3 December 2013; 12 years ago (Australia); 29 June 2016; 10 years ago (separate UK feed); 1 August 2017; 9 years ago (Malaysia on Unifi TV); 28 April 2022; 4 years ago (Russia); 14 December 2022; 3 years ago (Belarus); 1 January 2024; 2 years ago (Philippines); 1 January 2025; 21 months ago (Netherlands); 31 December 2025; 9 months ago (globally)
- Replaced by: Nick Jr. HD (UK & Ireland on Sky)
- Former names: MTVNHD (2008–2011; 2008–2012 UK); MTV Live HD (2011–2021; 2012–2021 UK)

Availability

Terrestrial
- Zuku TV (Kenya): Channel 753

MTV Live, previously known as MTVNHD and MTV Live HD, was a 24-hour, high-definition, live music pay television network and the international version of MTV Live in the United States owned and operated by Paramount Networks EMEAA.

== Overview ==
MTV Live, the first international HD channel dedicated to music videos, offered a mix of programming from MTV Europe. Initially managed by MTVNI's Emerging Markets group, the channel was produced and broadcast from its Warsaw hub until 22 April 2012, when operations moved to 17-29 Hawley Crescent, NW1 8TT, London, United Kingdom. This relocation coincided with the official launch of MTV Live HD.

The English-language channel featured a mix of original and acquired programming, along with content from MTVNI's extensive library. Its schedule included shows produced by other MTV production units in Southern Europe, the UK, and Latin America. Initially, the channel's programming was divided into two blocks: MTV HD and Nickelodeon HD. However, between October and December 2010, the channel aired only music-related content. Nickelodeon programming resumed during early morning weekend slots but was eventually phased out. On 1 July 2011, the channel shifted its focus entirely to live music programming.

=== History ===
The channel was launched on 15 September 2008 in parts of Europe under the name MTVNHD (MTV-Nickelodeon HD). By the end of 2008, it was also available in Latin America. The channel expanded to more countries throughout 2010, including Australia, where it was initially offered in standard definition.

On 1 July 2011, MTVNHD was renamed MTV Live HD and introduced a new logo as part of a global rebranding effort. However, in the UK and Ireland, the channel retained the MTVNHD name, while in Australia, it was rebranded as MTV Live. On 23 April 2012, MTVNHD officially rebranded as MTV Live HD in the UK and Ireland, and a standard-definition feed was introduced.

On 9 April 2013, MTV Live HD ceased broadcasting in France following the launch of HD feeds for the four French MTV channels. On 1 October 2013, both MTV Live HD and MTV Live adopted a new logo as part of another global rebranding. On 3 November 2013, MTV Live and MTV Live HD were discontinued on Foxtel in Australia.

On 2 March 2014, MTV Live HD launched in Taiwan on CHT MOD, followed by its debut on UPC Romania on 24 October 2014.

On 5 January 2015, MTV Live HD became encrypted and launched exclusively in the Arab world on OSN, replacing MTV Middle East. On 15 February 2016, the standard-definition MTV Live feed in the UK was discontinued and replaced by MTV Music +1.

On 29 June 2016, the UK feed of MTV Live HD was shut down and replaced by Nick Jr. HD on Sky, while the international feed of MTV Live HD was introduced on Virgin Media. On 29 March 2017, MTV Live HD launched in Portugal as an exclusive channel on MEO.

On 5 April 2017, MTV Live HD introduced a new logo, which was rolled out internationally.

On 3 August 2018, it launched in Brazil as an exclusive offering on NET.

On 1 February 2021, the Latin American feed, which previously had a 7-hour delay, became a simulcast.

From 1 May 2021 to 31 August 2022, MTV Southeast Asia shortened its broadcast to an 8-hour schedule, running from 4:00 pm to 12:00 midnight (SGT). This allowed selected programmes from its sister channel, MTV Live, to air on the channel from 12:00 midnight to 4:00 pm daily. During this time, MTV Southeast Asia focused more on music content and reduced its entertainment programming.

On 14 September 2021, MTV Live HD was renamed to MTV Live, dropping "HD" from its branding.

On 28 April 2022, due to the Russian invasion of Ukraine, MTV Live ceased operations in Russia during the broadcast of the programme Rock Solid Playlist.

On 1 September 2022, MTV Live launched in Malaysia, replacing MTV Southeast Asia on Astro TV. It also marked a return to Unifi TV after the channel had been discontinued on 1 August 2017. Additionally, MTV Live replaced MTV Southeast Asia in Hong Kong.

On 8 September 2022, at 10:00 pm BST, MTV Live (alongside MTV Music, MTV Hits, MTV 80s, and MTV 90s) temporarily suspended its regular programming following the death of Queen Elizabeth II. During this period, two special music video programmes were aired: Programming Pause, which ran from 8 September at 10:55 pm until 9 September at 12:30 pm, and Nothing but Music, which aired from 9 September at 3:00 pm until 13 September at 2:00 am. Regular programming for MTV Live resumed on 13 September at 2:00 am, starting with the Katy Perry and Nicki Minaj episode of My Life On MTV, while other MTV music channels in the UK and Ireland resumed regular schedules four hours later at 6:00 am. On 19 September 2022, all MTV music channels in the UK temporarily replaced their regular programming, including teleshopping, with the music programme Nothing but Music (known as Nothing but Hits on MTV Hits, Nothing but 80s on MTV 80s, and Nothing but 90s on MTV 90s) to commemorate Queen Elizabeth II's state funeral.

On 14 December 2022, MTV Live and other MTV channels ceased broadcasting in Belarus.

On 8 February 2023, MTV Live began airing MTV Top 20. However, this chart differs from those on MTV Hits and MTV.

On 17 October 2024, following the death of Liam Payne, MTV Live, along with MTV Music and MTV Hits (UK and International), temporarily suspended regular programming from 5:00 pm until 2:00 pm on 18 October (MYT). During this time, they aired Liam Payne: A Tribute, a music programme dedicated to his legacy. In November 2024, MTV created a new MTV Rewind ident that aired before and after its music programming, marking the first such ident in three years.

On 1 January 2025, MTV Live ceased operations in the Netherlands.

In March 2025, MTV Live changed its on-air idents from old (similar to UK feed of MTV music channels since 2021) to new on-air idents (similar to European feed of MTV music channels since 2021).

Before the official closing date In Brazil, Claro TV+ removed MTV Live along with its sister channels MTV 00s, Nick Jr, MTV, Comedy Central, Nickelodeon, and Paramount Network on 29 December, replacing their programming with an informational slideshow.

On 31 December 2025, after 17 years of broadcasting, MTV Live closed globally, with its last song being "Dancing on My Own" by Robyn.

== Availability ==
The channel was available in fourteen countries throughout Europe, East Asia, and Southeast Asia including:

- Belgium
- Germany
- Hungary
- Italy
- Portugal
- Spain
- Sweden
- Switzerland
- Turkey
- United Kingdom (studio broadcasting and head office in International)
- Indonesia
- Malaysia
- Singapore
- Hong Kong
- Mongolia

== Logos ==
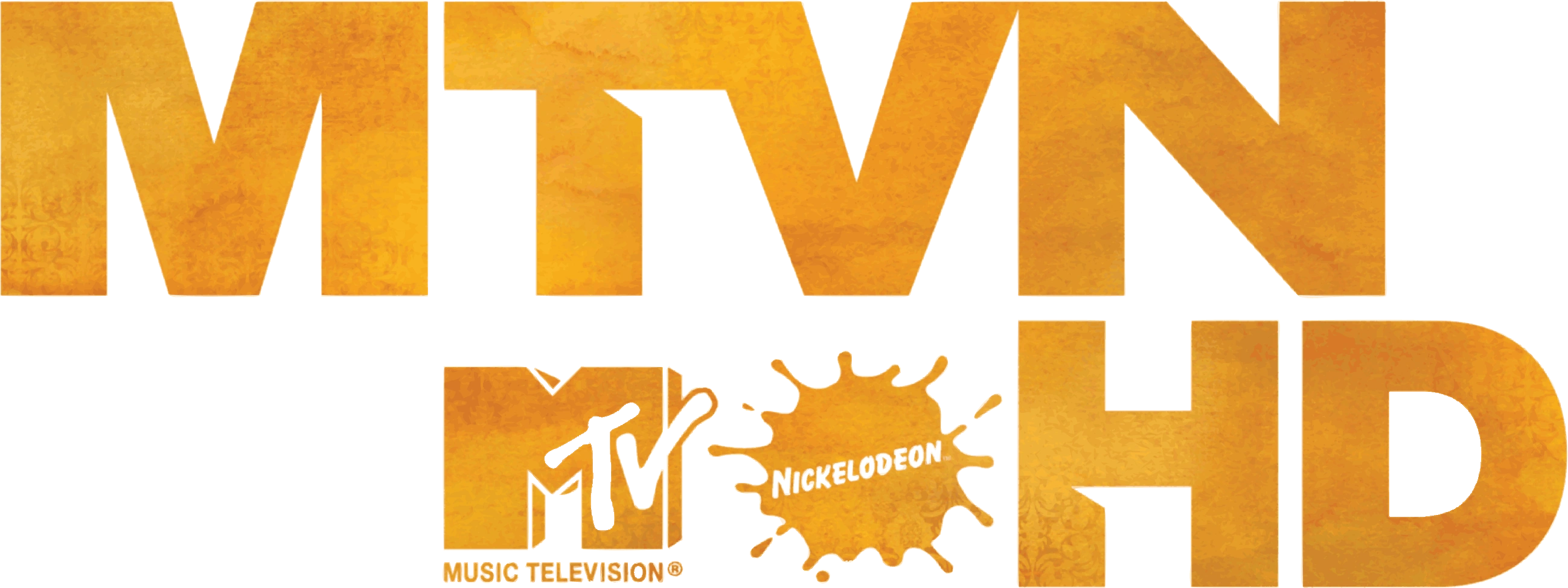
MTVNHD logo used from 15 September 2008 to 2010.

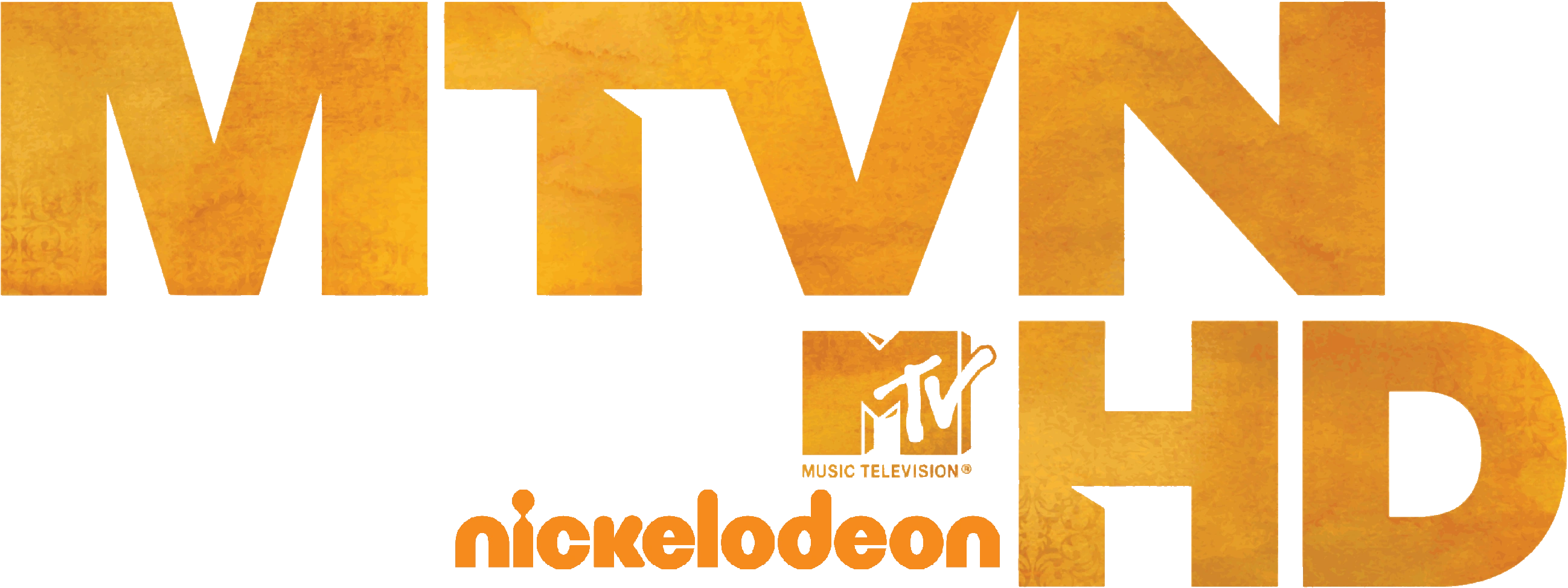
MTVNHD logo used on 1 January 2010 to 28 February 2010. The logo was changed in 2010 as a result of Nickelodeon's logo change. This logo was short-lived.

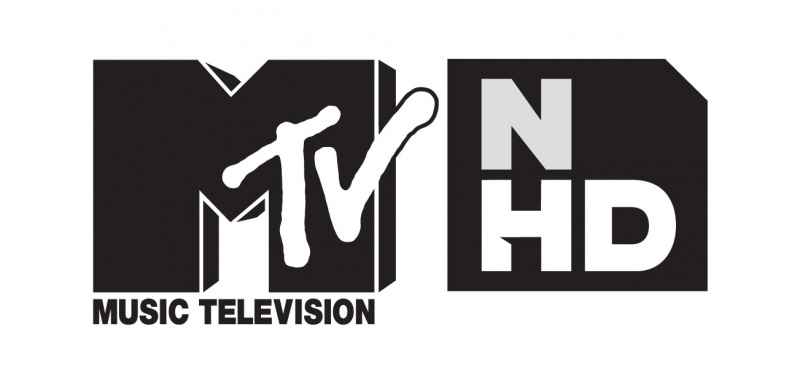
MTVNHD logo used from 2010 to 2011. The logo was kept in the United Kingdom until 22 April 2012 but on 30 June 2011 the "Music Television" word has removed.

MTV Live HD logo used from 1 July 2011 until 30 September 2013 in Europe and from 23 April 2012 until 30 September 2013 in the United Kingdom

Logo used from 1 October 2013 to 4 April 2017

Logo used from 5 April 2017 to 14 September 2021

Final logo used from 14 September 2021 to 31 December 2025

== See also ==
- MTV
- MTV Base
- MTV Classic
- Club MTV
- MTV Hits
- MTV Music
- MTV Rocks
- Paramount Networks EMEAA
