= Club MTV (Europe, Middle East and Africa) =

Defunct music television channel

- Final logo, used 2021 to 2025
- Broadcast area: Australia; Europe, Middle East and North Africa; Latin America and Caribbean

Programming
- Language: English
- Picture format: 16:9 576i/480i (SDTV)

Ownership
- Owner: Paramount Networks EMEAA
- Sister channels: MTV; MTV Hits; MTV Live; MTV 80s MTV 90s MTV 00s

History
- Launched: 27 May 2014; 12 years ago 1 August 2023; 3 years ago (Australia)
- Closed: 1 August 2015; 11 years ago (Italy); 1 July 2021; 5 years ago (Russia and CIS); 1 November 2025; 11 months ago (Australia); 31 December 2025; 9 months ago (globally)
- Former names: MTV Dance (2014–2020)

Club MTV, formerly MTV Dance, was a European pay television music channel from Paramount Networks EMEAA that replaced the British MTV Base on 7 March 2008. The network mainly broadcast music videos from the electronica and techno genres, and was commercial free.

== History ==
The channel was launched as MTV Dance on 7 March 2008, then became Club MTV from 1 June 2020. On 2 August 2015, it was removed from Sky Italia.

On 1 October 2017, MTV Dance ceased broadcasting in Benelux.

On 4 October 2018, the channel was removed on Numericable along with MTV Rocks following Comedy Central launch in France.

In 2019, the channel disappeared in Portugal being substituted by MTV Live HD.

The channel was rebranded as Club MTV from 1 June 2020. VIMN EMEA applied for a new licence for the channel on 7 April 2020.

On 1 March 2021, Club MTV expanded its broadcast area to the Middle East and North Africa through beIN Network.

On 1 July 2021, Club MTV, MTV Hits and Spike Russia ceased broadcasting in Russia and CIS countries.

On 1 August 2023, the channel replaced the Australian feed of Club MTV.

Since 14 April 2025, Club MTV International shares the same programming as the UK feed except Non-Stop Beats!. Club MTV added a quick on-air ident during the music program before playing the next music.

On 1 November 2025, Club MTV was removed from Fetch TV in Australia.

At 7:00 AM CET on 31 December 2025, Club MTV (along with MTV’s other music channels) closed internationally with its last music video being Don’t Stop the Music by Rihanna.

== Format ==
Club MTV played a selection of dance, trance, clubhouse, electronica, drum and bass, rap, R&B, hip-hop, techno and house music. The channel did not carry advertising.

== Availability ==
The channel was registered with RRTV in the Czech Republic, where it was registered to broadcast in Albania, Algeria, Andorra, Angola, Antigua and Barbuda, Australia, Argentina, Armenia, Austria, Azerbaijan, Bahamas, Bahrain, Barbados, Belgium, Belize, Benin, Belarus, Belgium, Bolivia, Bosnia and Herzegovina, Botswana, Bulgaria, Burkina Faso, Burundi, Cameroon, Cape, Central African Republic, Chad, Chile, Colombia, Comoros, Congo (Brazzaville), Congo (Kinshasa), Costa Rica, Croatia, Cuba, Cyprus, Czech Republic, Denmark, Djibouti, Dominica, Dominican Republic, Djibouti, Ecuador, Egypt, El Salvador, Equatorial Guinea, Eritrea, Estonia, Eswatini, Ethiopia, Finland, France, Gabon, Gambia, Ghana, Georgia, Germany, Greece, Grenada, Guatemala, Guinea, Guinea-Bissau, Guyana, Haiti, Honduras, Hungary, Iceland, Iran, Iraq, Ireland, Israel, Ivory Coast, Jamaica, Jordan, Kazakhstan, Kenya, Kuwait, Kyrgyzstan, Latvia, Lebanon, Lesotho, Liechtenstein, Liberia, Libya, Lithuania, Luxembourg, Madagascar, Mauritius, Mauritania, Malawi, Mali, Malta, Mexico, Moldova, Monaco, Montenegro, Morocco, Mozambique, Namibia, Netherlands, Nicaragua, Niger, Nigeria, North Macedonia, Norway, Oman, Panama, Paraguay, Peru, Poland, Portugal, Qatar, Romania, Russia, Rwanda, Saint Kitts and Nevis, Saint Lucia, Saint Vincent and the Grenadines, São Tomé and Príncipe, Saudi Arabia, Senegal, Serbia, Seychelles, Sierra Leone, Slovakia, Slovenia, Somalia, South Africa, South Sudan, Spain, Sudan, Suriname, Sweden, Switzerland, Syria, Tajikistan, Tanzania, Togo, Trinidad and Tobago, Tunisia, Turkey, Turkmenistan, Uganda, Ukraine, United Arab Emirates, United Kingdom, Uruguay, Uzbekistan, Vatican City, Venezuela, Yemen, Zambia and Zimbabwe.

== Logos ==
Logo used 27 May 2014 – 4 April 2017

Logo used 5 April 2017 - 1 June 2020

Logo used 1 June 2020 - 14 September 2021

Logo used 14 September 2021 – 31 December 2025
