= MTV Rocks (European TV channel) =

European television channel

- Broadcast area: List: Albania; Armenia; Austria; Bosnia and Herzegovina; Bulgaria; Croatia; Czech Republic; Denmark; Estonia; Finland; France; Georgia; Germany; Hungary; Iceland; Israel; Latvia; Lithuania; North Macedonia; Malta; Moldova; Montenegro; Norway; Poland; Romania; Russia; Serbia; Slovakia; Slovenia; Spain; Sweden; Switzerland; Ukraine; Turkey; New Zealand

Programming
- Language: English
- Picture format: 16:9, 1080i (HDTV)

Ownership
- Owner: ViacomCBS Networks EMEAA

History
- Launched: 27 May 2014; 12 years ago
- Replaced: MTV Rocks (UK & Ireland)
- Closed: 5 October 2020; 5 years ago
- Replaced by: MTV 90s

MTV Rocks Europe was a European pay television music channel from Viacom International Media Networks Europe that was launched on 27 May 2014, replacing the British version of MTV Rocks in Europe.

== History ==
On 17 November 2015, MTV Rocks Europe was removed from CanalSat.

On 1 October 2017, the European versions of MTV Rocks, MTV Dance and MTV Hits ceased broadcasting in Benelux.

On 4 October 2018, the channel was removed from Numericable along with MTV Dance Europe following the launch of Comedy Central France.

In 2019, the channel disappeared in Portugal.

On 2 May 2020, it was removed from Sky Italia.

The channel closed along with VH1 Classic Europe in October 2020 and was replaced by MTV 90s, after its British equivalent had closed three months earlier. MTV 90s was first launched on 27 May 2016 in the UK and Ireland as a temporary rebranding of MTV Classic UK until 24 June 2016.

The last video to be broadcast on MTV Rocks Europe was "Bullet Holes" by Bush.

== Programmes ==
- 100% Anthems
- Biggest! Hottest! Loudest!
- Rocks Rated
- Smells Like the 90s
- Supermassive Anthems
- This Week's Rock Solid Playlist
- Ultimate Rock Playlist
