= Me TV (TV series) =

- Genre: children's documentary
- Created by: Jeff Rustia
- Countries of origin: Philippines, Malaysia, Russia, Poland
- No. of seasons: 2
- No. of episodes: 26

Production
- Producer: Jeff Rustia
- Running time: 1-3 minutes
- Production companies: FRONT TV, Nickelodeon Asia

Original release
- Network: Nickelodeon Philippines, Nickelodeon Malaysia, Nickelodeon Russia, Nickelodeon Poland
- Release: November 5, 1998 – January 5, 2001

Me TV (known as Мэн патологоанатом Телевизор in Russia, Mnie Telewizja in Poland, and Sa akin Telebisyon in the Philippines), was a popular Nickelodeon interstitial show about children from around world and their many passions, hobbies, and interest. The live action show was shot all over Asia and Europe, where kids were asked to answer everything under the sun from what their favorite foods and movie stars were, to probing questions like "What would you do if you were President of your country?" Popular episodes filmed in the Philippines and India included "What's in your lunchbox?", "How do you get to school?" and "What would you do if you could design your own uniform"? The show aired from 1998 to 2001, and 26 episodes were produced in the length of two TV seasons.
