= MTV Philippines =

MTV Philippines can/may refer to the following:

- MTV (Philippines, 1992–2010), the first and original variant
- MTV (Philippines, 2014–2017), the second variant, known as MTV Pinoy
- MTV (Philippines, 2017–2019), the third and final feed, known by its shortener MTVph
