= MTV (Philippines, 2014–2017) =

Defunct Philippine television channel

MTV Pinoy
- Final logo used from February 2014 to March 2017
- Country: Philippines
- Headquarters: Quezon City and Ortigas Center, Pasig, Philippines

Programming
- Languages: Filipino (primary); English (secondary)
- Picture format: 480i (SDTV)

Ownership
- Owner: Viacom International Media Networks Asia; Viva Entertainment (Cable BOSS Inc.)
- Sister channels: Through Viacom: MTV Asia, Nickelodeon Philippines (independently), Comedy Central Asia, MTV Live HD; Through Viva: Pinoy Box Office, Viva TV, TMC, Sari-Sari Channel

History
- Launched: February 1, 2014 (Main channel); January 1, 2017 (MTV Pinoy Pop program block)
- Closed: December 31, 2016 (Main channel); March 6, 2017 (MTV Pinoy Pop program block)
- Replaced by: MTV Asia; MTVph
- Former names: MTV Philippines (1992–2010)

MTV Pinoy (formerly MTV Philippines) was a Philippine music and entertainment pay television network owned by Viacom International Media Networks Asia (a division of Viacom International Media Networks), with a partnership with Viva Entertainment to collaborate on local productions, events, marketing and advertising sales. The network was launched on February 1, 2014. It operated from 16:00 to 1:00 each night. After that, it would rebroadcast MTV Asia's programming.

On December 1, 2014, MTV Pinoy launched new shows (such as MTV Halo-Halo, The OPM Show, MTV Top 20 Pilipinas, Rock On Pinas!, Throwback, Ikot, and Feedback) and it became a 24-hour channel. By that time, only live events, specials, and a few of its programs were still simulcast (simultaneously broadcast) from MTV Asia. On January 1, 2017, the channel was closed down and replaced by MTV Southeast Asia. This was possibly due to Viacom switching partnerships from Viva to rival company Solar Entertainment, as well as the intense competition from ABS-CBN's music network, Myx. OPM related programs from MTV Pinoy were transferred to Viva TV. Only MTV Pinoy Pop and some local advertising remained in the network until March 6, 2017.

== Background ==
=== History ===
Prior to its relaunch, it was known as MTV Philippines: a corporate venture between MTV Networks Asia and Nation Broadcasting Corporation, then it transferred to a new partnership with All Youth Channels, Inc. which began on March 1, 2007. Its broadcast started in May 1992, with MTV Networks Asia providing much of the broadcast content, and NBC provided the infrastructure. The network was once located at The Fort in Fort Bonifacio, Taguig and at Silver City in Frontera Verde (now Ortigas East), Pasig. The channel was closed down on February 16, 2010, when Francis Lumen, the president and CEO of All Youth Channels Inc., decided not to renew the contract for the network's broadcast extension. Its shutdown started with the music video played 11 minutes before midnight, "Video Killed the Radio Star" by The Buggles, which was the very first music video ever played at the launch of MTV in the United States on August 1, 1981. After the closure, it reverted to its original channel, MTV Southeast Asia, and MTV in the Philippines remained on hiatus.

=== Formation ===
Prior to the return of MTV to the Philippines, executive vice president and managing director of Viacom International Media Networks Asia Indra Suharjono decided to bring back the channel after a nearly four-year hiatus since 2010. She stated that ever since she made channels such as Nickelodeon, Comedy Central, and specifically MTV Live HD available in the country, she sought to launch MTV again for the sake of young Philippine people and the importance of their local music industry.

On November 5, 2013, it was announced that VIMN Asia was looking for partnership for the re-launch. Suharjono asked first to make amends for agreement to Viva Entertainment founder Vic del Rosario Jr., but later confirmed that VIVA would partner with MTV to collaborate on local production, on-ground events, marketing and advertising sales. After finding a new partnership in Viva Communications, the new channel made a major overhaul, and was reintroduced to the country as MTV Pinoy.

On February 14, 2014, at 4 pm, MTV Pinoy was launched with its first program, MTV Halo-Halo with VJ Sam. "Dear Lonely" performed by Zia Quizon was the first music video aired on the channel. In February 2016, MTV Pinoy's MTV Top 20 Pilipinas, hosted by VJ Aryanna, started airing every Saturday nights on TV5. This happened after the appointment of Vic del Rosario's as the network's chief entertainment strategist and followed by Viva takes over the dissolved TV5's main Entertainment department, However, in September 2016, MTV Top 20 Pilipinas on TV5 was cancelled as former Gilas Pilipinas and PBA head coach, Chot Reyes took over as president of TV5 (until Reyes resigned in June 2019).

MTV Pinoy has extended its coverage to over 1.22 million Filipino households all over the country since its initial broadcast.

=== MTV Halo-Halo ===
MTV Halo-Halo was a Philippine music video television program owned by MTV Pinoy. The show, which played OPM (original Pilipino music) and international music, was launched on February 14, 2014, jointly with MTV Pinoy.

On December 1, 2014, as part of the all-new MTV Pinoy line-up, they also launched a spin-off called MTV Halo-Halo Hits which played hit songs continuously with no VJs. On December 31, 2016, MTV Halo-Halo ended its final broadcast, along with the entirety of MTV Pinoy, and was reverted to MTV Southeast Asia.

== MTV Pinoy's Past Video Jockeys (VJs) ==
The new VJs have been introduced in this MTV format.

- VJ Andre (André Paras)
- VJ Aryanna (Aryanna Epperson)
- VJ Josh (Josh Padilla)
- VJ Katarina (Katarina Rodríguez)
- VJ Kito (Kito Romuáldez)
- VJ Sam (Sam Pinto)
- VJ Schneider (Chris Schneider)
- VJ Shy (Shy Carlos)
- VJ Yassi (Yassi Pressman)

== Programs ==
- Awkward
- Are You the One?
- Catfish: The TV Show
- Car Crash Couples
- Disaster Date
- House of Food
- Hangout with Donnalyn
- MTV Europe Music Awards
- MTV Hits
- MTV Halo-Halo
- MTV Hashtags
- MTV Idol
- MTV Ko
- MTV Movie Awards
- MTV Pwesto
- The MTV Show
- MTV Sing
- MTV Today's Top 10
- MTV Top 5 Countdown (moved to TV3)
- MTV Top 10 International
- MTV Top 10 Pilipinas
- MTV Top 20 International
- MTV Top 20 Pilipinas (also aired on TV5)
- MTV Video Music Awards
- MTV World Stage
- OK Pop
- The OPM Show
- Pinoy Beats
- Pinoy Pop
- Playlist
- Pretty Little Liars
- Punk'd
- Rock On Pinas!
- Ridiculousness
- Senti
- ShoutOut
- Throwback
- Usavich
- VH1 Hits

== See also ==
- Viacom
- Viva Communications
- Channel V Philippines (defunct)
- MTV Philippines (defunct)
- MTV Southeast Asia
- MTVph (defunct)
- Myx
