= MTV (Philippines, 2017–2019) =

Defunct Philippine television channel

MTVph
- Final logo used from August 2017 to December 2018
- Country: Philippines
- Broadcast area: Defunct

Programming
- Language(s): English, Filipino
- Picture format: 4:3 480i (SDTV)

Ownership
- Owner: ViacomCBS Networks International Asia; Solar Entertainment Corporation (Cable BOSS Inc.)
- Sister channels: Through Viacom: MTV Asia, Nickelodeon Philippines (independently), Comedy Central Asia, MTV Live HD, MTV Classic; Through Solar: ETC, Basketball TV, NBA Premium TV, Jack TV, Solar Sports, Solar All Access, Shop TV

History
- Launched: August 1, 2017
- Replaced: MTV Philippines (1992–2010); MTV Pinoy (2014–2016)
- Closed: December 31, 2018
- Replaced by: MTV Asia
- Former names: MTV Philippines (1992–2010); MTV Pinoy (2014–2016)

MTVph (formerly MTV Philippines and MTV Pinoy) was a 24-hour music and entertainment television network co-owned by ViacomCBS Networks International Asia and Solar Entertainment Corporation. The network launched on August 1, 2017, on all cable/satellite providers in the Philippines. It closed on December 31, 2018.

== History ==
Before its launch, the channel was known as MTV Philippines and MTV Pinoy. During the MTV Philippines years, the joint venture ownership of the channel changed twice: it was owned by Nation Broadcasting Corporation from 2001 to 2007, and by All Youth Channels, Inc. from 2007 to 2010. The first incarnation of MTV in the Philippines (MTV Philippines) ceased operations on February 15, 2010, with "Video Killed The Radio Star" by The Buggles as the final song. The song was also played as the first music video played in MTV USA back in 1981, as well as on MTV Classic in the US, and on MTV Classic UK and MTV Classic Australia when the respective channels were rebranded.

MTV was relaunched in the Philippines on February 14, 2014 as MTV Pinoy, replacing MTV Southeast Asia. The first music video played on that channel was "Dear Lonely" by Zia Quizon. The channel was co-owned by MTV Networks Asia Pacific and Viva Communications, with the latter providing the required infrastructure. One notable program that aired on MTV Pinoy was MTV Halo-Halo.

On January 1, 2017, MTV Pinoy's feed reverted to MTV Asia. This was possibly due to Viacom switching partnerships from Viva to rival Solar Entertainment, as well as intense competition from ABS-CBN's music network, Myx. OPM-related programs from MTV Pinoy were transferred to Viva TV and only MTV Pinoy Pop and some local advertising remained, which appeared on the Southeast Asia feed until March 6 that year. MTV Pinoy was replaced by the Solar-owned MTVph starting August 1, 2017 on the American network's 36th birthday.

On July 19, 2017, Viacom International Media Networks and Solar Entertainment Corporation, a Philippine content provider and television network, announced that they would launch the Philippine feed of MTV Southeast Asia as MTVph.

As with MTV's other Filipino ventures since the Fifth Republic was constituted, MTV Pinoy failed to attract an audience, and the network closed on January 1, 2019, reverted to MTV Asia.

== Format ==
MTVph was broadcast in 4:3 aspect ratio (16:9 letterbox). For MTV Southeast Asia programs, Solar retained the original aspect ratio, albeit downscaled to 480i.

== Programming ==
Unlike the previous two MTV channels in the Philippines (MTV Philippines and MTV Pinoy), MTVph aired in MTV Southeast Asia Philippine feed.

== See also ==
- MTV Philippines
- MTV Pinoy
- MTV Asia
- Myx
- Solar Entertainment
- ViacomCBS
- Channel V
