= DWNB-TV =

One Sports 41 Manila (DWNB-TV)
- Metro Manila; Philippines
- City: Quezon City; Mandaluyong
- Channels: Analog: 41 (UHF) (until January 15, 2027); Digital: 51 (UHF; ISDB-T); Virtual: 51.01

Programming
- Language: Filipino (mainly)
- Affiliations: 51.01: One Sports; 51.02: One PH; 51.03: True TV

Ownership
- Owner: Nation Broadcasting Corporation
- Operator: TV5 Network, Inc.
- Sister stations: DWET-TV (TV5); DZKB-TV (RPTV); DWLA-FM (105.9 True FM)

History
- Founded: January 1, 2001; 25 years ago
- Former call signs: DZRU-TV (2001–2006)
- Former names: MTV Philippines (2001–2011); AksyonTV (2011–2019); 5 Plus (2019–2020)
- Former affiliations: MTV Philippines (2001–2007); AksyonTV (2011–2019); 5 Plus (2019–2020)
- Call sign meaning: Nation Broadcasting Corporation

Technical information
- Licensing authority: NTC
- Power: 30 kW (100 kW on-operational power output)
- Transmitter coordinates: 14°36′26″N 121°9′49″E

Links
- Website: www.onesports.ph

DWNB-TV (channel 41) is a television station in Metro Manila, Philippines, serving as the flagship of the One Sports network. It is owned by Nation Broadcasting Corporation; TV5 Network, Inc., which owns TV5 flagship DWET-TV (channel 5), operates the station under an airtime lease agreement. Both stations share studios at the TV5 Media Center, Reliance cor. Sheridan Sts., Mandaluyong, while DWNB-TV's alternate studio and hybrid digital transmitting facilities (for DTV UHF channel 18) is located at TV5 Complex, 762 Quirino Highway, Brgy. San Bartolome, Novaliches, Quezon City (sharing facilities with 106.7 Energy FM and TV5), and its hybrid analog and digital transmitting facilities (for VHF channel 41 and DTV UHF channel 51) is located on Block 3, Emerald Hills, Sumulong Highway, Antipolo, province of Rizal (sharing facilities with sister station 92.3 Favorite Music Radio and 105.9 True FM).

== History ==
=== As MTV Philippines (2001–2006) ===
Previously, DZRU UHF channel 41 was being planned for use by NBC for its own acquired programming under the multimedia convergence program of the station's current owners. But sometime in 2000, MTV Asia wanted to go 24 hours on terrestrial television which it didn't get when they were still buying airtime through Studio 23 (now known as S+A).

NBC broadcast executives, led by the radio station manager Francis Lumen, signed a joint venture agreement with MTV Networks Asia Pacific (now Paramount Networks EMEAA) for the right to use NBC's UHF Channel 41 for the latter's new extension, to be christened MTV Philippines. The move was in line with NBC's trends toward converging traditional broadcasts with the giant telecommunications backbone of the Philippine Long Distance Telephone Company (PLDT), which had acquired NBC from the Yabuts and Villars in 1998 to achieve that purpose.

UHF Channel 41 has its own studio complex at The Fort (now Bonifacio Global City) where its shows were broadcast to Metro Manila and nearby areas.

After six years of partnership in the Philippines, MTV Philippines was placed off-the-air after a multi-year deal with All Youth Channels, Inc. following the dissolution of partnership with NBC.

MTV Philippines was relaunched on March 1, 2007, as a cable and satellite TV channel while UHF channel 41 was inactive for three years (even MTV Philippines was ceased to exist in February 2010).

=== As AksyonTV Channel 41 (2010–2019) ===
In October 2010, UHF Channel 41 went back on-air and began its test broadcast as ABC Development Corporation (now TV5 Network, Inc.) took over the blocktime that will alternate TV5's programming and will feature news & public service information programs when mentioned new blocktimers took over the management of NBC stations; the call letters were also changed to DWNB-TV.

By that day, UHF Channel 41 broadcast the feed of sister station 92.3 News FM (after the U92.3 FM (previously managed by All Youth Channels, Inc., which currently owns its cable channel, Nickelodeon Philippines (under MTV Networks Asia Pacific) signed off on the 30th day of the previous month) from 12nn to 8 pm daily, but this was temporarily ended by the first quarter of December.

The next few months, UHF Channel 41 prepared for the first non-cable news, current affairs and information & sports channel on TV, AksyonTV, named after the flagship news program Aksyon. It was successfully launched on February 21, 2011, at exactly 4:00 in the morning, airing its first program Andar ng mga Balita hosted by Martin Andanar, which was actually a simulcast of the morning news program on News FM of the same title.

The channel is also aired over Channel 29 (free-TV) on the areas of Cebu, Davao, Cagayan de Oro and Zamboanga, Channel 46 over Iloilo City, and on selected cable channels. It operates 24 hours a day except for Holy week where its classic programs are limited. On April 30, AksyonTV Channel 41 is also aired on SkyCable via channel 61, but it was moved to Channel 59 in July 2011.

On December 1, 2013, Aksyon TV Channel 41 limited its operations from 24 hours to the time mentioned above, together with the other networks such as BEAM Channel 31 (the former Jack City, which is now a cable and satellite only channel; and later defunct, when the channel was rebranded as CT), and 3ABN/Hope Channel Philippines 45; because due to rules and regulations for affiliated free-to-air TV stations assigned by National Telecommunications Commission that they've should not broadcast/operates 24/7 if they're not having any programs that they will be aired as well as an effect of cost-cutting measures by the management.

=== As 5 Plus (2019–2020) ===
On November 30, 2018, The 5 Network announced that AksyonTV would relaunch as 5 Plus on January 13, 2019. The network now airs "atypical sports" programming with additional coverage from ESPN5 and new sports-related contents which will target a younger, more adventurous audience or the millennials. With this move, selected Radyo5 simulcast programs will move to newly stand-alone channel, One PH at the satellite service, Cignal.

=== As One Sports (since 2020) ===
On March 8, 2020, 5 Plus was renamed to One Sports as a terrestrial television channel, while the other counterpart of One Sports was re-branded to One Sports+.

In November 2025, the National Telecommunications Commission (NTC) issued Memorandum Circular No. 005-11-2025, establishing a 12-month transition period for analog television stations operating in Mega Manila. The covered area includes the National Capital Region and parts of Bulacan, Rizal, Laguna, Cavite, Pampanga and Bataan. In July 2026, the NTC identified November 22, 2026, as the target date for the Mega Manila analog switch-off. The analog shutdown date was extended by the NTC on November 17, 2026, from the original November 22, 2026, it became January 15, 2027.

== Digital television ==
=== Digital channels ===
DWNB-TV's digital signal operates on UHF Channel 51 (695.143 MHz)^{1} and broadcasts on the following subchannels:

Channel	Video	Aspect	Short name	Programming	Notes
51.01	480i	16:9	One Sports	One Sports (Main DWNB-TV programming)	Commercial free-to-air broadcast (5.5 kW)
51.02	480i	16:9	One PH	One PH	Commercial free-to-air broadcast (5.5 kW)
51.03	480i	16:9	True TV	105.9 True FM	Commercial free-to-air broadcast (5.5 kW)
51.35	240p	4:3	One Sports 1SEG	One Sports	1seg broadcast

=== Subchannel history ===
On January 22, 2024, DWNB-TV's feed and broadcast output on DWET-TV along with TV5's other digital stations, has switched to the 16:9 widescreen format.

Notes

^{1} - Permanent digital frequency assigned by NTC (through a Memorandum Circular).
^{2} - Licensed to Mediascape (Cignal TV), Inc.

== See also ==
- TV5
- One Sports
- RPTV
- 105.9 True FM
