= Nickelodeon Global (Limited) =

Global Limited feed of Nickelodeon

- Logo used since 2023 (Note: The logo's wordmark has been in use since March 15, 2010. Additionally, there is a variant meant to be used for white backgrounds; the main variant has a white wordmark in conjunction with a fully orange splat.)
- Broadcast area: Southeast Asia; Hong Kong; Taiwan; Parts of Oceania; Sri Lanka; Maldives; Middle East; Africa (except South Africa which switched to Nickelodeon Global Unlimited); CIS (except Russia and Belarus); Turkey
- Headquarters: Singapore

Programming
- Languages: English; Malay; Indonesian; Thai; Mandarin; Cantonese; Amharic; Arabic; Kazakh; Russian; Turkish
- Picture format: 1080i HDTV; SDTV 480i/576i (downscaled)

Ownership
- Owner: Skydance Corporation (Skydance Global Content Sales)
- Parent: Nickelodeon Group
- Sister channels: Nick Jr.

History
- Launched: 5 November 1998; 28 years ago (Philippines); February 1999; 27 years ago (Indonesia); October 1999; 27 years ago (Malaysia); January 2000; 26 years ago (New Zealand); 9 March 2001; 25 years ago (Singapore); February 2002; 24 years ago (Hong Kong); 1 August 2017; 9 years ago (Unifi TV, Malaysia); 2018; 8 years ago (Maldives and Dialog TV, Sri Lanka); 25 November 2025; 11 months ago (CIS and MENA); 27 January 2026; 9 months ago (Sub-Saharan Africa and Turkey)
- Replaced: Nickelodeon India (On specific providers in Sri Lanka and the Maldives); Nickelodeon Global Unlimited (in Middle East, Africa, CIS and Turkey)
- Closed: July 31, 2006 (New Zealand)
- Replaced by: Nickelodeon New Zealand (in New Zealand)

Links
- Website: Official website

Availability

Terrestrial
- StarHub TV Singapore: Channel 314 (HD)
- Singtel TV Singapore: Channel 240 (HD)

Nickelodeon Global (Limited) (formerly Nickelodeon Asia) is a pan-Asian pay television channel operated by Skydance Asia-Pacific, Middle East and North Africa and owned by Skydance Global Content Sales, based in Singapore and broadcast to audiences in Southeast Asia and certain regions in Oceania like Polynesia and Papua New Guinea. The channel was launched on 1998 and mainly broadcasts original series from Nickelodeon's namesake television channel in the United States.

== History ==
The channel was first launched in the Middle East and North Africa in June 1996 as a 24-hour English-language TV channel.

Since 1996, Nickelodeon decided to reach the popular channel to the Philippines, Japan, Russia & the CIS, and Asia. One of their shorts were Right Here, Right Now (based on the 1993 Nick US shorts) and their ID's were by FRONT. Broadcasts in Singapore started on 9 March 2001. In 2003, it became a part of NickSplat (Nickelodeon's headquarters in Asia).

On 11 October 2006, Viacom's subsidiary MTV Networks Asia Pacific set up a new unit to manage a feed based in Singapore. Nickelodeon was launched in Singapore and expanded its services in Southeast Asia and Polynesia. Nickelodeon Philippines, Nickelodeon Pakistan, and Nickelodeon India started working independently. They started their new website in 2003.

In 2018, the channel launched in both Sri Lanka (via Dialog TV) and Maldives, replacing Nickelodeon India due to the said feed's heavy localization.

On 1 August 2023, the channel started to utilize the Splat 2023 branding used internationally.

On 25 November 2025, the channel launched in CIS, three months later Nickelodeon Asia expanded to Africa and Turkey, replacing the Global feed.

== Availability ==
=== Middle East ===
In the Middle East, Nickelodeon Asia was made available to Middle Eastern viewers in the region via the ABS-2 satellite and it was broadcast in English. Previously, the channel was made available to Middle Eastern viewers in the region via the Palapa C2 and D satellites until 2010, when Nickelodeon Asia left Palapa D. Also, it was available in Showtime Arabia until 2007 when it shut down.

On 25 November 2025, the channel was relaunched in Arab world for the first time in 15 years since 2010, replacing Nickelodeon Global.

=== Philippines ===
Available in English, Nickelodeon Asia was launched in the Philippines on 1 April 2011 as a dedicated Filipino Nickelodeon channel.

=== Singapore ===
In Singapore, Nickelodeon Asia is available in English. The channel was launched on 9 March 2001.

=== Indonesia ===
In Indonesia, Nickelodeon Asia is available in both Indonesian and English and it was launched in February 1999.

=== Malaysia ===
Available since October 1999; currently broadcasting in English, Malaysian, Mandarin Chinese.

=== Thailand ===
In Thailand, Nickelodeon Asia is available via TrueVisions and it was broadcast in Thai. In 2020, Nickelodeon was extended to AIS Play & 3BB Giga TV for Major Pay Television Networks in Thailand along with Nick Jr..

=== Taiwan ===
In Taiwan, Nickelodeon Asia is available in Mandarin Chinese.

=== Hong Kong ===
In Hong Kong, Nickelodeon Asia is currently broadcasting in Cantonese, made available since February 2002.

=== Maldives ===
In the Maldives, Nickelodeon and Nick Jr. Asia were launched available on Medianet in June 2018.

=== Myanmar ===
In Myanmar, Nickelodeon Asia is available on Channel 15 on Sky Net and Canal+ Myanmar Channel 114 and is also on OTT Platform Cookie TV.

=== Sri Lanka ===
in Sri Lanka, Nickelodeon Asia launched in August 2018 on Dialog TV, replacing Nick India. However, Nick India continues to broadcast on PEO TV.

=== South Korea ===
In South Korea, Nickelodeon Asia was launched in 2003 in South Korea airing in English with subtitles in Korean and was available through SkyLife. the channel replaced Tooniverse but was later removed in 2006, SkyLife did not carry Nickelodeon until 2014.

On 1 July 2022, Nickelodeon was replaced with KiZmom, and relaunched as a programming block on Tooniverse.

=== Branded programming blocks across Asia ===
==== Vietnam ====
In Vietnam, Nickelodeon was a programming block on YouTV, branded as Nick & You. It first launched in September 2016. However, the block was closed on 31 December 2022.

==== Mainland China ====
In Mainland China, Nickelodeon was made available to Chinese viewers via a programming block branded as HaHa Nick based in Shanghai, which existed from May 2005 to October 2007, broadcasting in Mandarin Chinese. Nickelodeon is currently defunct in China with its programming moved to channels such as CNTV.

== Kids Choice Awards ==
=== Indonesia ===
The Indonesia Kids Choice Awards is the first Kids Choice Awards set in Asia next to the Philippines. The first show was held since 2008 in Jakarta and was first hosted by Tora Sudiro, Tasya Kamila and Ringgo Agus Rahman and some various Indonesian Artist's over the years. The logo of the show is exactly the same as the US version however, it is designed for the Indonesian version of the show and still read Nickelodeon Indonesia Kids Choice Awards.

=== Philippines ===
The Philippines Kids Choice Awards is the second setting of the Kids Choice Awards in Asia preceded by Indonesia. The show was first held since 2008 at the Aliw Theater in Pasay and was first hosted by Michael V. and some various Filipino artists. According to Amit Jain, executive vice-president and managing director of MTV Networks India, China and Southeast Asia, "This is a milestone for Nickelodeon's business in Southeast Asia as it will deliver on Nick's commitment of providing global kids-centric shows and properties which are adapted to reflect local tastes and aspirations." The Philippines KCA has been inactive all over the years.

== Sister channels ==
Nick Jr. is the preschool channel which replaced the Nick Jr. block on Nickelodeon's main pan-Asian feed on 1 July 2011. It was launched on May 18, 2011, on StarHub TV Channel 304 in Singapore and on TelkomVision Channel 305 in Indonesia. The channel expanded its broadcast to other parts of Southeast Asia thereafter.

== Logo history ==
July 16, 1996 – March 13, 2010

March 14, 2010 – August 1, 2023 (concurrently used)

August 1, 2023 – present

== See also ==
- Nickelodeon
- Nickelodeon (Philippines)
- Nickelodeon (Russian TV channel)
- Nickelodeon (Japanese TV channel)
- Nickelodeon (South Korean TV channel)
- Nickelodeon (Indian TV channel)
- Nickelodeon Pakistan
- Nickelodeon (New Zealand TV channel)
- Nickelodeon (Australia and New Zealand)
- Nickelodeon (Malaysian TV channel)
