= Nickelodeon (Malaysian TV channel) =

Malaysian television channel

Nickelodeon Malaysia
- Logo in use since August 1, 2023 (Note: The logo's wordmark has been in use since 2010. Additionally, there is a variant meant to be used for white backgrounds; the main variant has a white wordmark in conjunction with a fully orange splat.)
- Broadcast area: Malaysia, Brunei
- Network: Paramount Networks EMEAA
- Headquarters: Singapore

Programming
- Languages: English (original audio), Malay, Mandarin
- Picture format: 1080i HDTV (downscaled to 576i for the SD feed)

Ownership
- Owner: Astro
- Parent: Nickelodeon Group

History
- Launched: May 21, 1999
- Replaced: Nickelodeon Southeast Asia) (Malaysia only)

Links
- Website: Nickelodeon SEA Homepage

Nickelodeon is a Malaysian television channel owned by Astro. It launched on November 1, 1999.

Nickelodeon is available on Astro Channel 616. English is a primary audio of the channel with dubbing in Malay on the secondary audio channel. In 2007, a third audio channel Mandarin was added. However, the Malay and Mandarin audio channels are only available on selected programming blocks. If attempted to access the audio tracks on blocks where they are not transmitted, it instead airs on the English primary audio channel.

== History ==
Starting from 2006, much of Nickelodeon's programming was available on free-to-air channel 8TV and TV9 with content dubbed into Malay as part of its Nick di 9 Nickelodeon block, which aired from 3:00 pm to 6:00 pm. However, CJ WOW Shop took over time on that slot, it moved to 8:30 am to 10:00 am every Monday to Thursday from 4 April 2016 to 1 March 2018 and later reduced to every day at 7:00 pm for showing selected program on 5 March 2018. More popular programs are also aired with their original English And Malay soundtracks on TV3, NTV7 and 8TV.

On 26 August 2019, Unifi TV broadcast the channel in HD due to high viewership.

On 21 November 2019, Astro broadcast the channel in HD on Channel 632 and moved to Channel 616 on 1 April 2020.

In late March 2019, Nick's show slot on TV9 was transferred to TV3 under a new name, Nickelodeon Bananana! TV3. It runs from 10am to 11am.

== Logo History ==
July 16, 1996 – March 13, 2010

March 14, 2010 – August 1, 2023 (Concurrently used)

August 1, 2023 - Present

== See also ==
- Nickelodeon South East Asia
- ViacomCBS Networks International
- Nickeledeon Bananana TV3 (Redirects to Malay Wikipedia)
