= Ark Avilon Zoo =

Ark Avilon
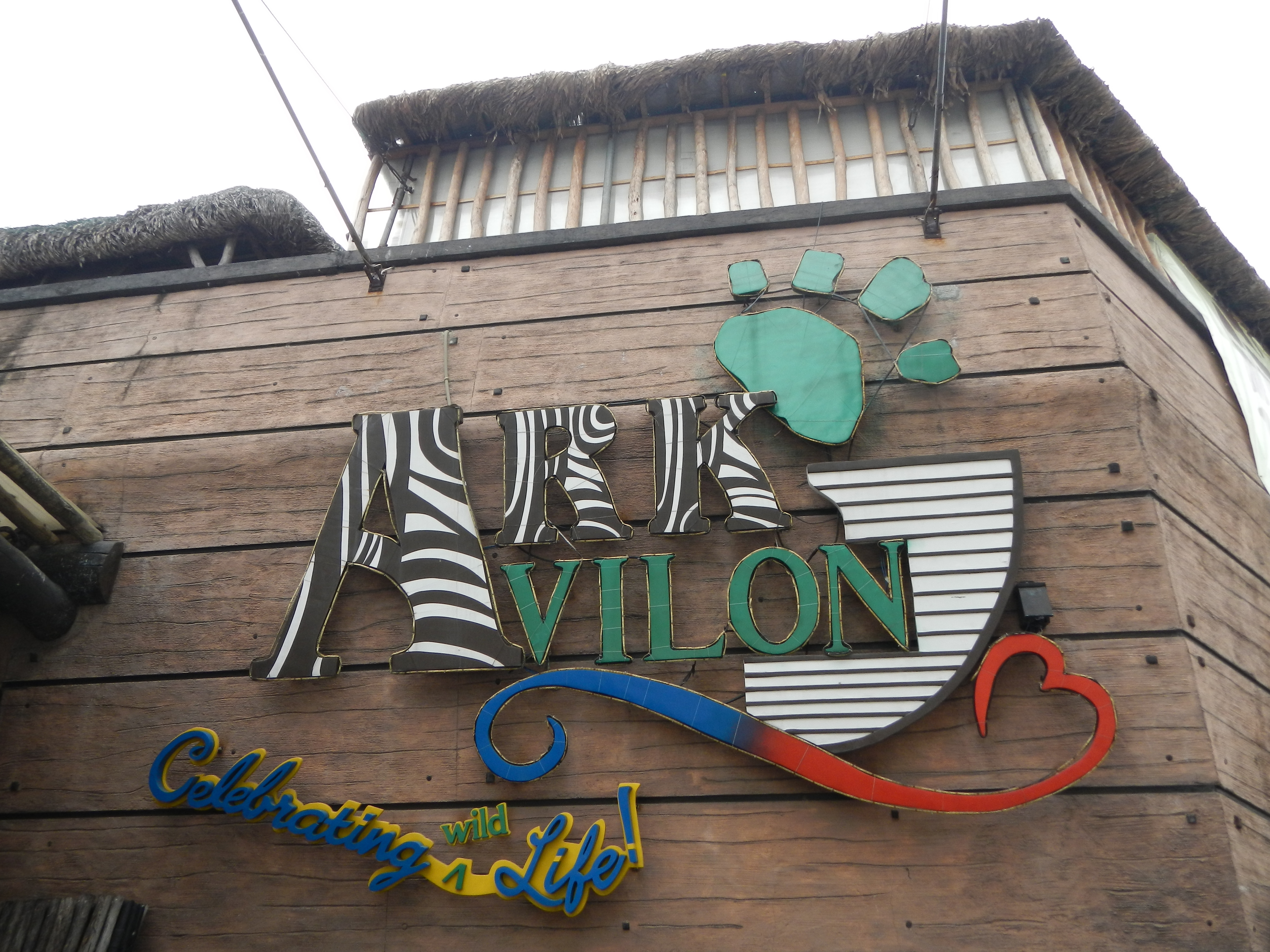
- Date opened: 2008
- Date closed: 2019
- Location: Ortigas East, Pasig, Metro Manila, Philippines
- No. of species: ~100 (2018)
- Website: www.avilonzoo.ph

Ark Avilon Zoo was an indoor zoo in Ortigas East, Pasig. It was affiliated with the Avilon Zoo in Rodriguez (Montalban), Rizal.

== History ==
The Ark Avilon Zoo was a joint venture between the company behind the Rizal-based Avilon Zoo and Ortigas & Co. Ltd. Partnership. The indoor zoo housed inside an ark-like structure was opened in 2008. It closed in 2019, after operating for 11 years, after Avilon Zoo's lease agreement with Ortigas & Co. expired.

== Zoo building ==
The Ark Avilon Zoo was housed inside a two-storey structure which is patterned after Noah's Ark. The zoo was part of the Tiendesitas development of Ortigas & Co. at Ortigas East (formerly Frontera Verde)

== Animals ==
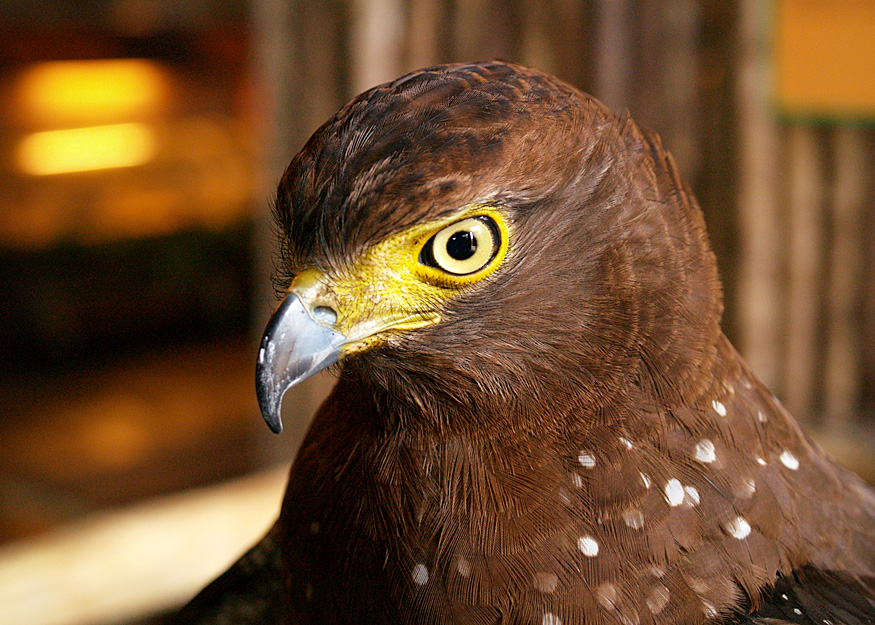
Philippine serpent eagle in captivity.

In 2018, there were reportedly 100 kinds of animals housed inside the Ark Avilon. Among the animals exhibited include the capybara, meerkats, tigers (white tiger and Bengal tiger) and the sunbear. It also had reptiles such as Philippine saltwater crocodile and fishes such as the arapaima
