= Bpm:tv =

bpm:tv
- bpm:tv logo
- Country: Canada
- Broadcast area: National
- Headquarters: Toronto, Ontario

Programming
- Picture format: 480i (SDTV)

Ownership
- Owner: Stornoway Communications
- Sister channels: The Pet Network ichannel

History
- Launched: September 7, 2001
- Closed: June 1, 2015

Links
- Website: bpm:tv

bpm:tv (beats per minute television) was a Canadian English language specialty channel owned by Stornoway Communications. bpm:tv's programming was devoted to dance music, club lifestyle, and the EDM genre - electronica, house, techno, eurodance, trance.

== History ==
The channel's original logo on a blue background. A 2D version of its current logo, it has used several different colours through its use until 2004, when it introduced its current 3D version.

In November 2000, a partnership between Stornoway Communications and Cogeco called Stornoway Communications Limited Partnership, was granted approval by the Canadian Radio-television and Telecommunications Commission (CRTC) to launch a television channel called The Dance Channel, described as "a national English-language Category 2 specialty television service devoted to all aspects of dance."

The channel was launched on September 7, 2001 as bpm:tv with a schedule largely focused on electronic dance music video programming but steered away from the European-based underground EDM and redirected its interest towards a more mainstream radio sound.

In January 2004, the CRTC approved an application by Stornoway to acquire Cogeco's interest in the service.

On April 30, 2015, Cogeco announced on their Facebook page that bpm:tv will be "shutting down operations" effective June 1, 2015. The shutdown was subsequently confirmed by bpm:tv via an official announcement posted on their website.

The closure of bpm:tv has left Canada without a dedicated channel devoted to dance music for three years until 2018 when Stingray Group launched Stingray Hits! initially in French, with the English version later added.

== Programming ==
The majority of bpm:tv's schedule consisted of music video-based programs. Other programs featured artist profiles, concerts, dance programming, and club lifestyle programs.

Programs formerly broadcast by the Canadian television channel bpm:tv, which ran from 2001 to 2015:

- 60 bpm (2008-2009)
- Afterdark
- BACK @ YA!
- Baker & Becker
- Best & Worst
- Blender
- bpm:tv Nightlife
- bpm Spotlight
- bpm:tv presents...
- Cheez Viz
- Chill Out
- Club Fashion
- Dance Files
- Dance Moves
- Dance Recall
- Dekadance
- DiscoMix
- electronica
- Erotic Star
- The Essential...
- EuroMix
- First Dance
- Foreign Flo
- French Connection
- Friday Night Dance Party
- Get Up N Dance
- Hip Hop Nation
- Hot 20 Dance Chart
- Hot 20 Recall
- HouseMix
- Karaoke High (2007-2010)
- Live Sessions
- London Live
- MC Mario's Mixdown (2004-2009)
- Mix Of Nations
- Mixmasters
- Nubeatz
- Peak Hour
- Planet Rock Profiles
- Remix Remade Remodeled
- Rewind (Hot 20)
- Room 208
- Saturday Night Dance Party
- Spincycle
- Top 100 DJs
- Top 100 Gay Anthems
- TranceMix
- The Ultimate (2008-2010)
- The Underground
- Urban Groove
- Video Killed the Radio Star
- Viewer Top 10
- Wildlife
- Xtendamix

== VJs and hosts ==
- Jorie Brown
- Marie Cauchon
- René Escobar
- Scott Fox
- Aminder Gill
- Dalton Higgins
- Troy Jackson
- Patricia Jaggernauth
- Max Julien
- Louie La Vella
- A.J. Leitch
- Brian Mangubat
- MC Mario
- DJ Marky D
- Simone Maurice
- Vishanti Moosai
- Joy Olimpo
- Cinar Onat
- Miss Raquel
- Adam Rodness
- Jeff Rustia
- Chris Sheppard
- Aliya Jasmine Sovani
- Emily Tan
- Kaley Tate
- Joanne Varkas
- Scott Willats
