= Nick Jr. (Southeast Asia) =

Educational cable TV channel in Southeast Asia

- Broadcast area: Southeast Asia; Hong Kong; Taiwan; Maldives

Ownership
- Owner: Skydance Asia-Pacific, Middle East and North Africa (Skydance Global Content Sales)
- Parent: Nickelodeon Group
- Sister channels: Nickelodeon

History
- Launched: 20 December 2010; 15 years ago (New Zealand); 18 May 2011; 15 years ago (Singapore); 1 June 2011; 15 years ago (Malaysia); February 2012; 14 years ago (Thailand); 1 November 2013; 13 years ago (Hong Kong)
- Replaced: Disney Junior (selected providers)

Links
- Website: nick.com/nick-jr/nick-jr

Availability

Terrestrial
- StarHub TV Singapore: Channel 304 (HD)
- Singtel TV Singapore: Channel 238 (HD)

Nick Jr. is an pan-Asian pay television channel aimed at younger children, operated by Skydance Asia-Pacific, Middle East and North Africa and owned by based on the also known as a U.S. channel. on Skydance Global Content Sales.

On 20 December 2010, Nick Jr. was launched in New Zealand, 18 May 2011 in Singapore, 1 June 2011 in Malaysia, February 2012 in Thailand, and 1 November 2013 in Hong Kong.

== History ==
Nick Jr. along with MTVNHD was launched in New Zealand on 20 December 2010 and in Asia on 18 May 2011. It was promoted on Nickelodeon. The channel was first featured on SKY TV in New Zealand, StarHub TV in Singapore, HyppTV in Malaysia, 1-Sky in Thailand, and TVB Network Vision in Hong Kong.

MTV Asia was broadcasting in New Zealand before Nick Jr., Nickelodeon previously broadcast in New Zealand from 2000 to 2006. Nick Jr. officially launched in New Zealand on 20 December 2010. Its high definition channel is broadcast in Southeast Asia and selected regions.

Since 2021, Nick Jr. replaces in most of its channel lineups, especially its rival channel Disney Junior that was shut down in the same year.

== See also ==
- Nickelodeon
- Nick Jr. Channel
- Nickelodeon Philippines
