= Tiendesitas =

Shopping complex in Pasig, Philippines

Coordinates: 14°35′09″N 121°04′41″E

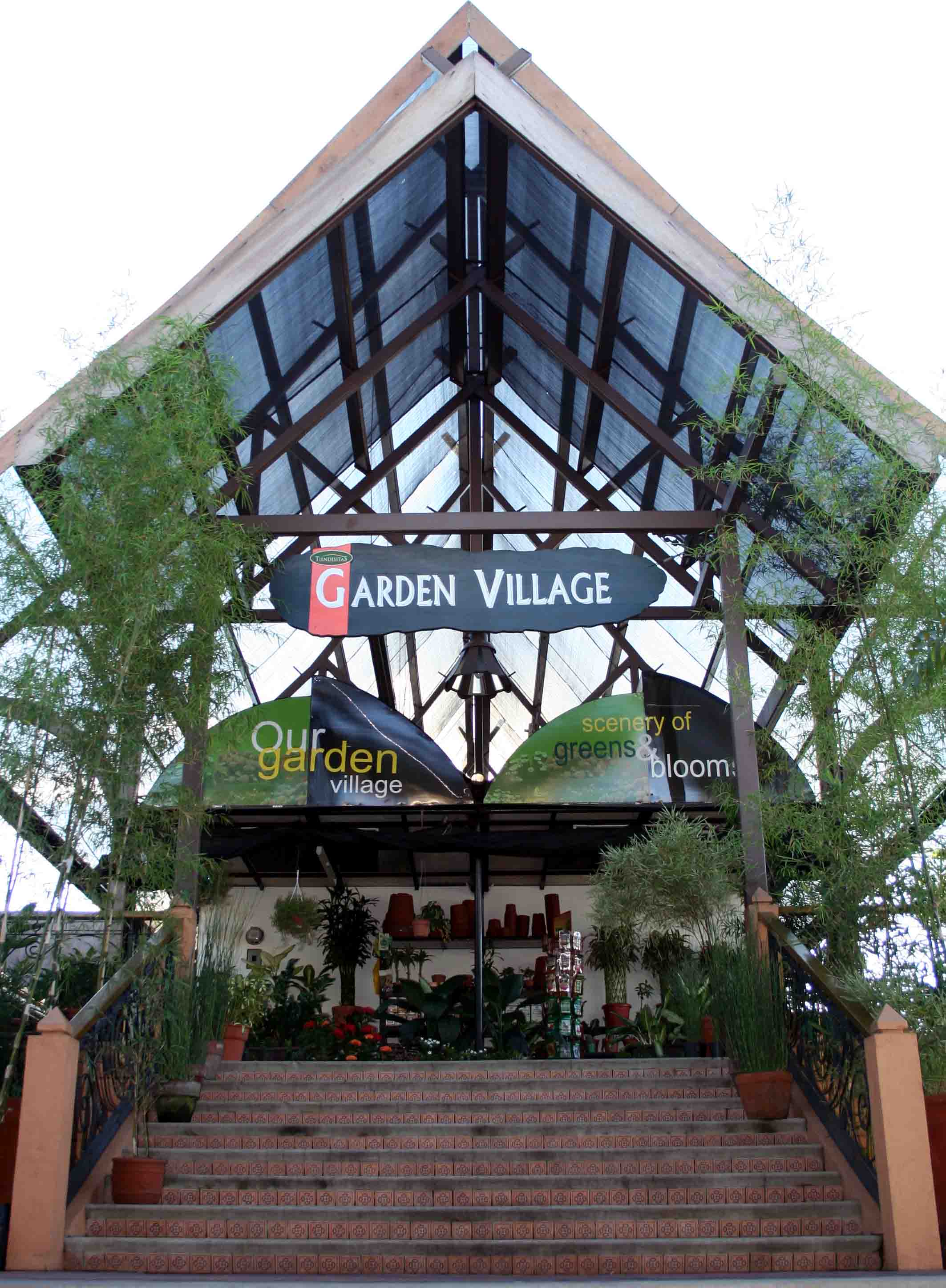
The Garden Village at Tiendesitas

Tiendesitas ("a collection of little stores") is a shopping complex located in Ortigas East, Pasig.

== Development ==
The complex commenced operations on September 26, 2005, and was developed by Ortigas & Company Limited Partnership (OCLP). Constructed at P200 million, Tiendesitas is a part of Ortigas East (former Frontera Verde), an interim 18.5 hectare Ortigas Center development project, similar to the Greenhills Shopping Center.

The complex is surrounded by parking spaces and is mainly served by jeepneys on C-5, as well as buses that stop a short walk from the Tiendesitas gate.

== Tiendesitas Villages ==
Tiendesitas is a 30,000 square metres (320,000 sq ft) complex of wide-opened "villages" featuring stylized Filipino architecture. The complex consists of twelve pavilions inspired by Maranao architecture, which, in turn, traces its roots back to the Bahay kubo. The roof of each pavilion is covered with chemically treated Cogon grass and is equipped with sprinklers to avoid mishaps during fires. Duyans (hammocks) are scattered around the development to offer short breaks during shopping trips. The Filipiniana inspiration extends to the comfort rooms: Old kalesa wheels were transformed into chandelier frames to light up these restrooms.

More than 450 traders from Luzon, Visayas, and Mindanao specializing in merchandise from regions not usually found in mainstream retail outlets exhibit their wares in Tiendesitas' shopping pavilions. Haggling a la tiangge is a common negotiating tactic among local merchants.

=== Handicrafts Village ===
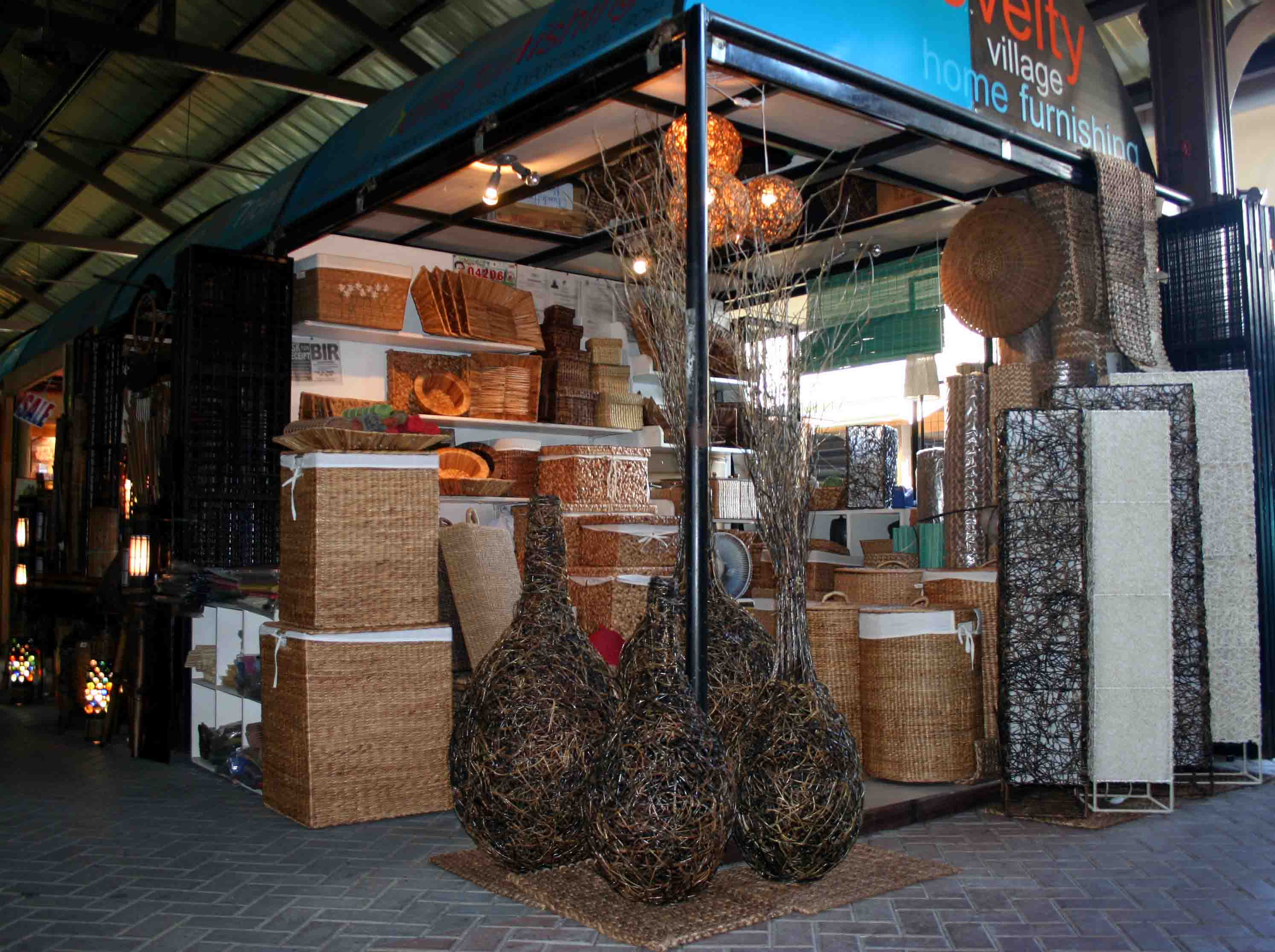
Handicrafts Village

Philippine-made handicrafts (by members of Philippine Chamber of Handicrafts Industries) from home décor to fashion accessories are found at the Handicrafts Village. Benguet handicrafts are included in the limited edition merchandise to be found here.

=== Fashion Village ===
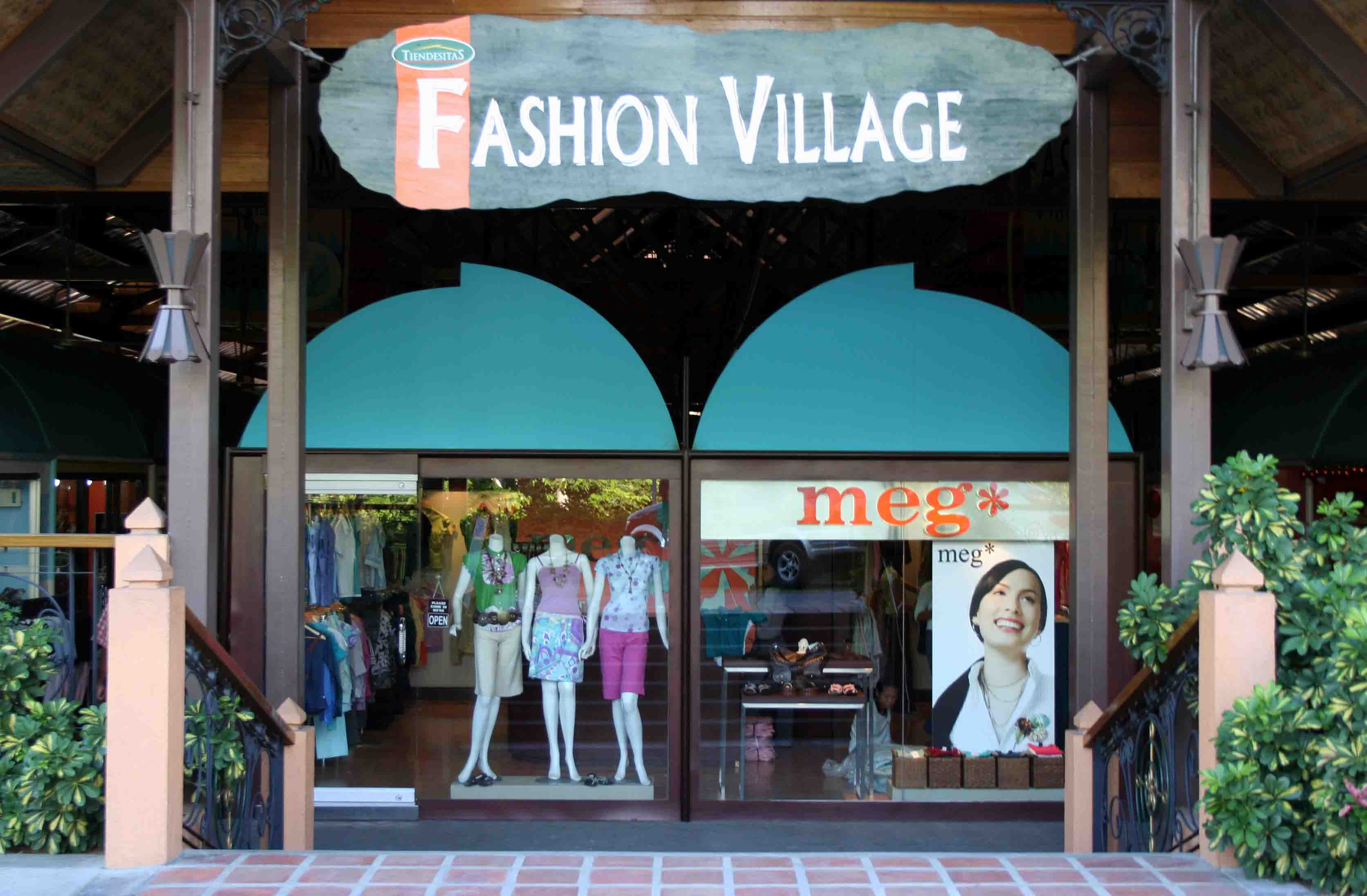
Fashion Village

The Fashion Village showcases apparel and accessories from Philippine designers, notably Marikina. Fashions sold in the Fashion Village include fabric woven in various regions of Mindanao, shell earrings from Cebu, and necklaces from other provinces in the South.

=== Personal Care and Novelties Village ===
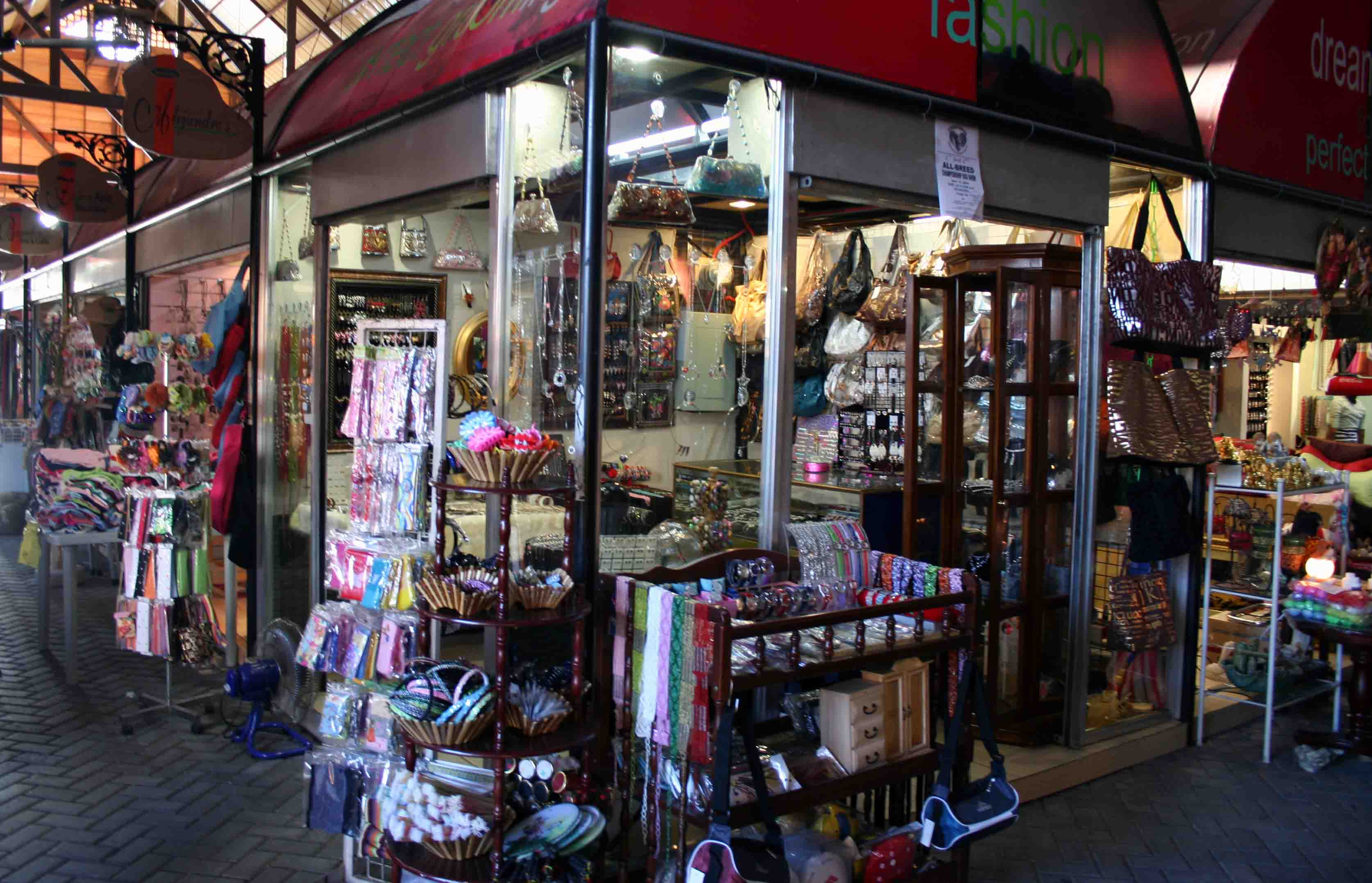
Novelties Village

Personal care and toiletries sold in the Personal Care and Novelties Village include homegrown, homemade organic soaps, lotions, and aromatherapy lines developed by local traders. While these products normally surface only during bazaars, the Personal Care and Novelties Village allows them a year-round place to be exhibited and marketed to the public.

=== Pets Village ===
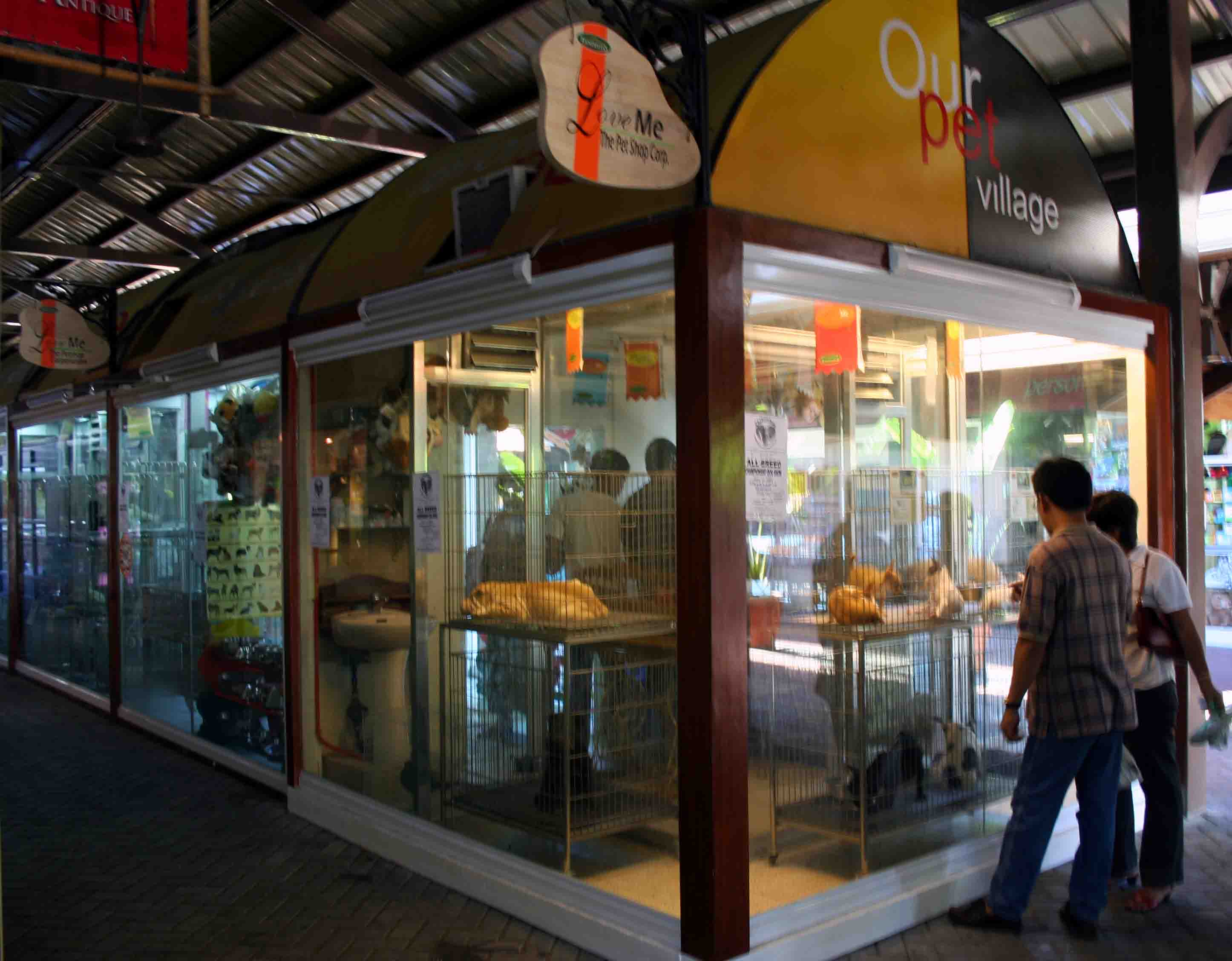
Pet Village

Licensed pet dealers in the Pets Village showcase exotic animals, rare species of birds, primates, snakes, and iguanas. Domestic pets such as Labradors, Siamese cats, parrots, and parakeets are also available. Pet grooming and care services are also available in the Pets Village.

=== Garden Village ===
A variety of potted plants, orchids, fruit-bearing trees, and ornamentals can be seen at the Garden Village. Gi

=== Antiques Village ===
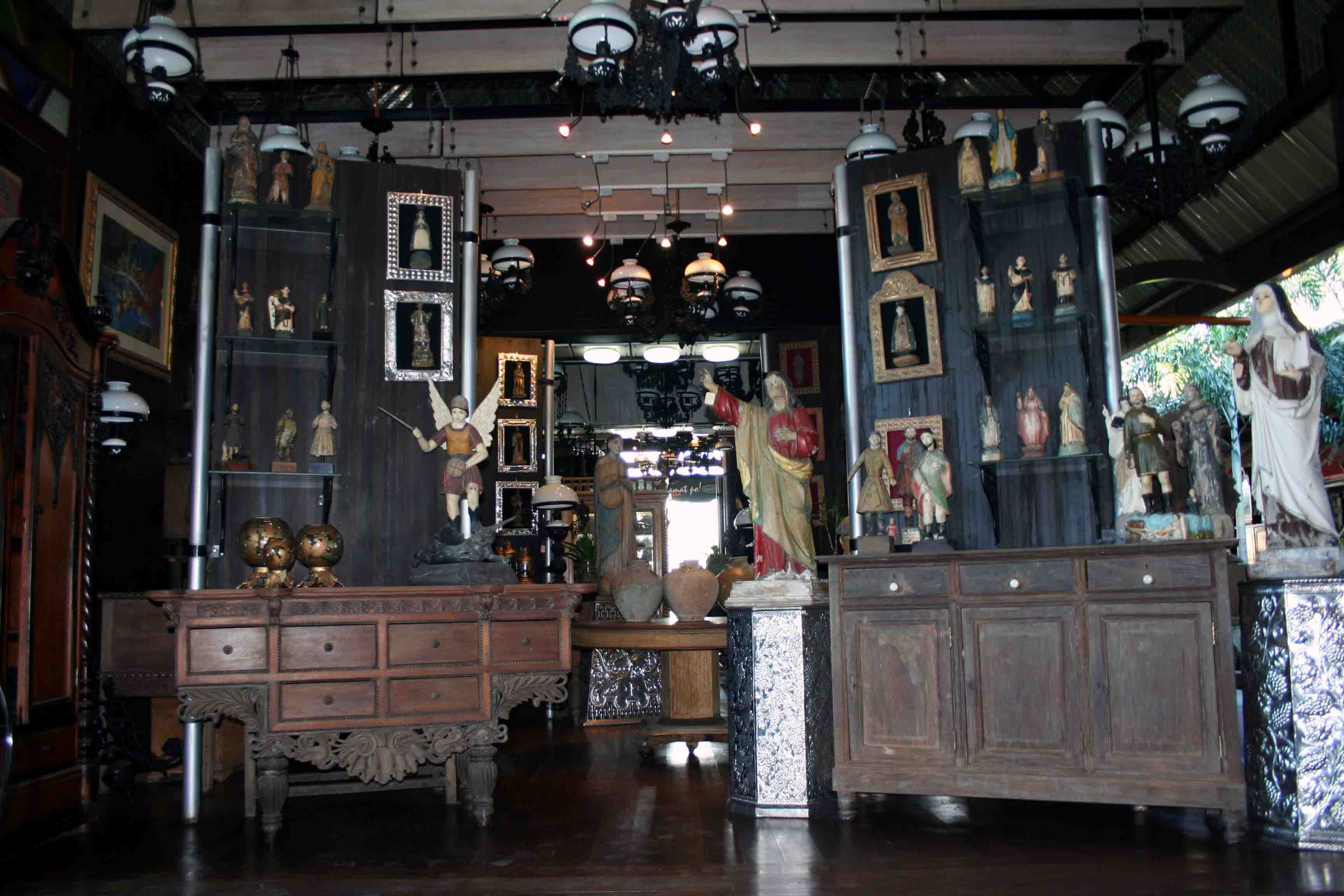
Antiques Village

The Antiques Village hosts antique stores. The most expensive item in the store is an P800,000 – worth statue of Saint Augustine from Bohol. Other stalls sell carvings of the bulol, a granary god, with prices climbing to as high up as P40,000, while contemporary wood carvings from Cebu cost at least P350.

=== Furniture Village ===
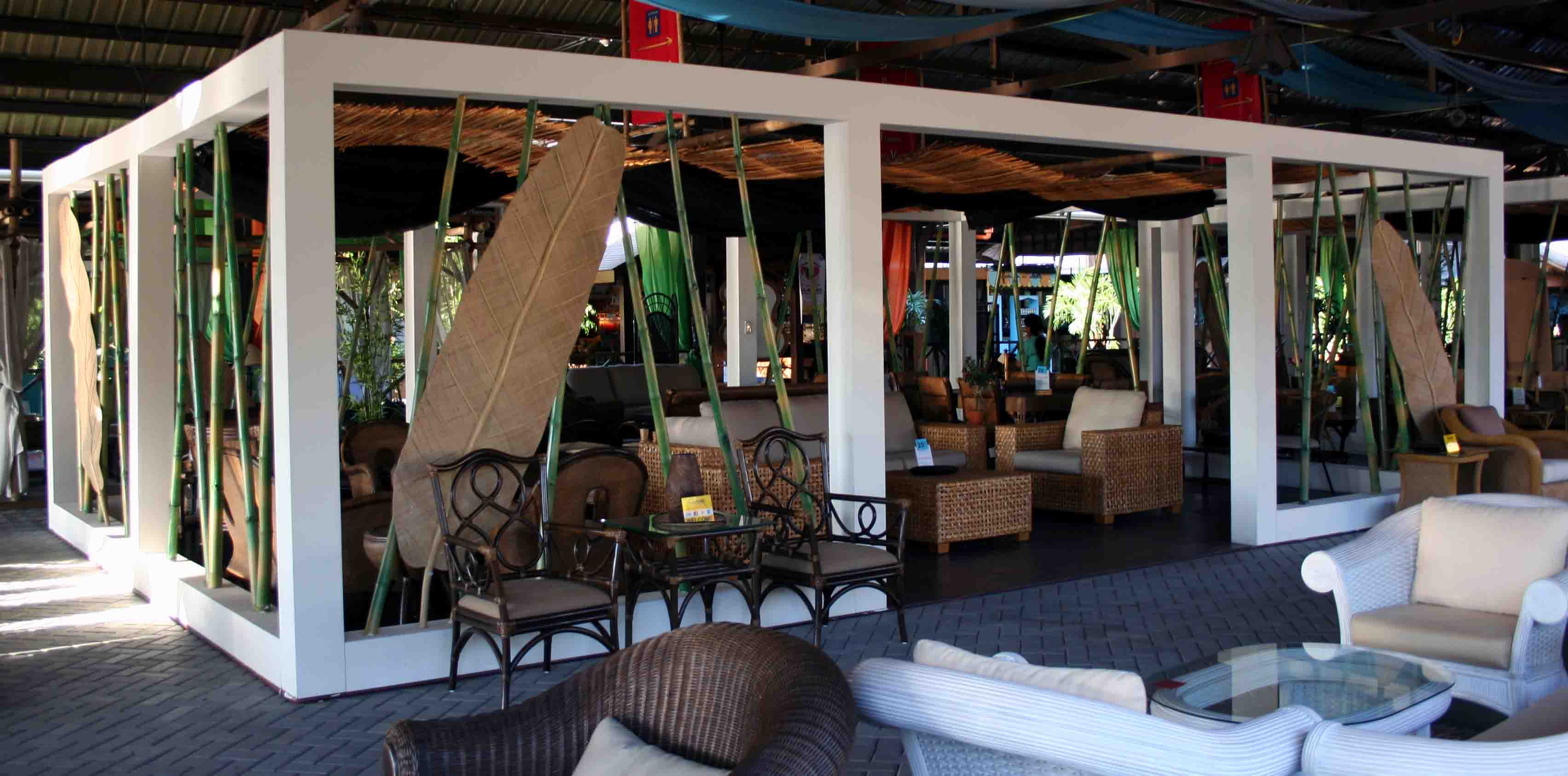
Furniture Village

Modern, export-quality furniture is sold in the Furniture Village.

=== Food Village ===
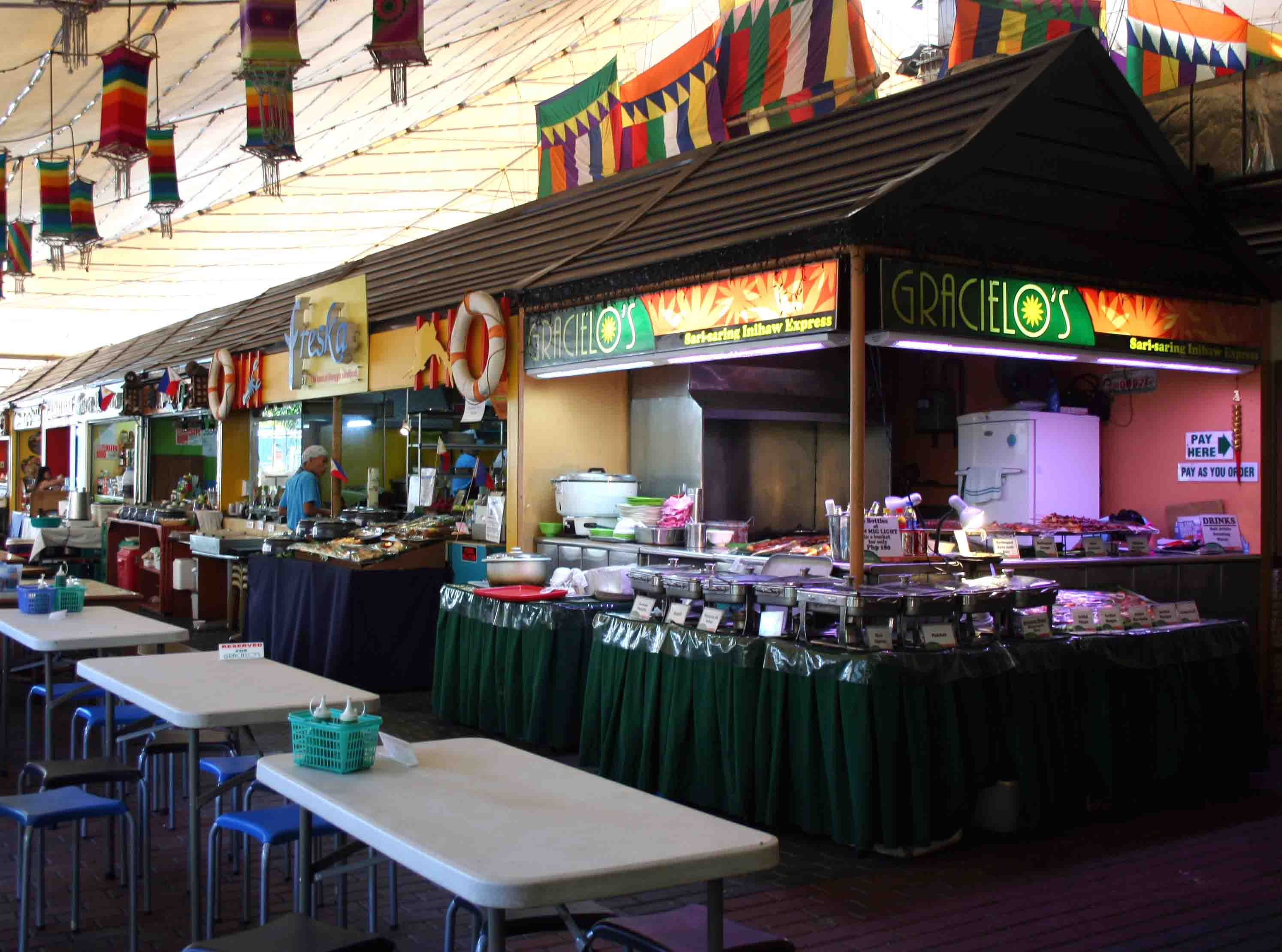
Food Village

The Food Village hosts 46 stalls selling local food specialties such as halo-halo, ihaw-ihaw, Minette's Inasal, Tita Lynn's flavored suman, Three Sisters’ Pasig pancit with chicharrón, budbod of Taytay (rice toppings), sisig, lechón, milkfish, and merienda specialties like bibingka, puto bungbong and kakanin. Products from the country's premier farms like Nenita's and Dizon's will also be made available here.

=== Delicacies ===
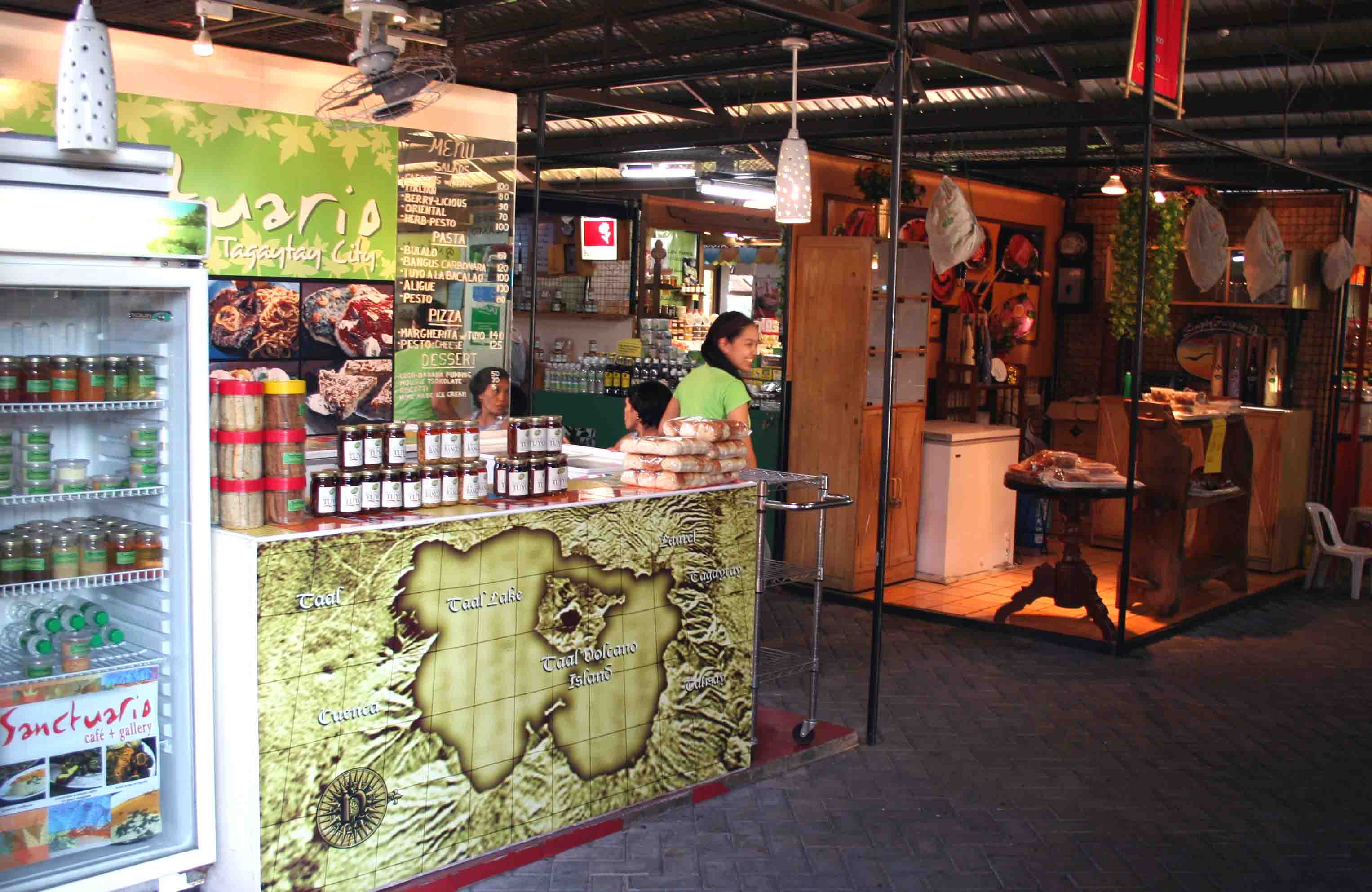
Delicacies Village

In the Delicacies Village, vendors sell small food offerings suitable for pasalubong – including Vigan's empanada and longganisa, Tacloban's suman sa latik, chocolate suman, ube suman, langka suman, and Cebu's famous danggit. Fresh fruits from the Davao Region like durian, mangosteen, and mangoes (among others) to organic and fresh vegetables from Baguio and Benguet are also available.

Seafood sold in the Delicacies Village include special dried fish and pili from the Bicol Region, famous balut from Pateros, tuna from General Santos, crispy shrimp, cornick, and bagnet from Ilocos, taba ng talangka, biurong dalag, bottled smoked fish and oysters from Aklan, and the well-loved boneless bangus from Dagupan.

Many varieties of rice for cooking are sold here, including Nueva Ecija's Jasponica and Balatinao from Benguet.

== Exhibits ==
An area in Tiendesitas is dedicated to special trade shows, exhibits, and unique Filipino cultural presentations that are scheduled year-round. The Tiendesitas opening in September 2005 began with a week-long Bonsai exhibit at the People's Village and was followed in October by an antique exhibit.

== Calesa Rides ==
Shoppers can take calesa rides through the complex. During the opening, there were only three calesas available. Since then, more calesas have been operating in the area.

== Entertainment ==
Tiendesitas provides live entertainment daily starting at 8:30 PM. Live bands perform in the middle of Tiendesitas. On Sundays, along with the live band, the Bughaw Cultural Dance Group regularly performs – allowing visitors to witness traditional Filipino dances.
