= Avilon Zoo =

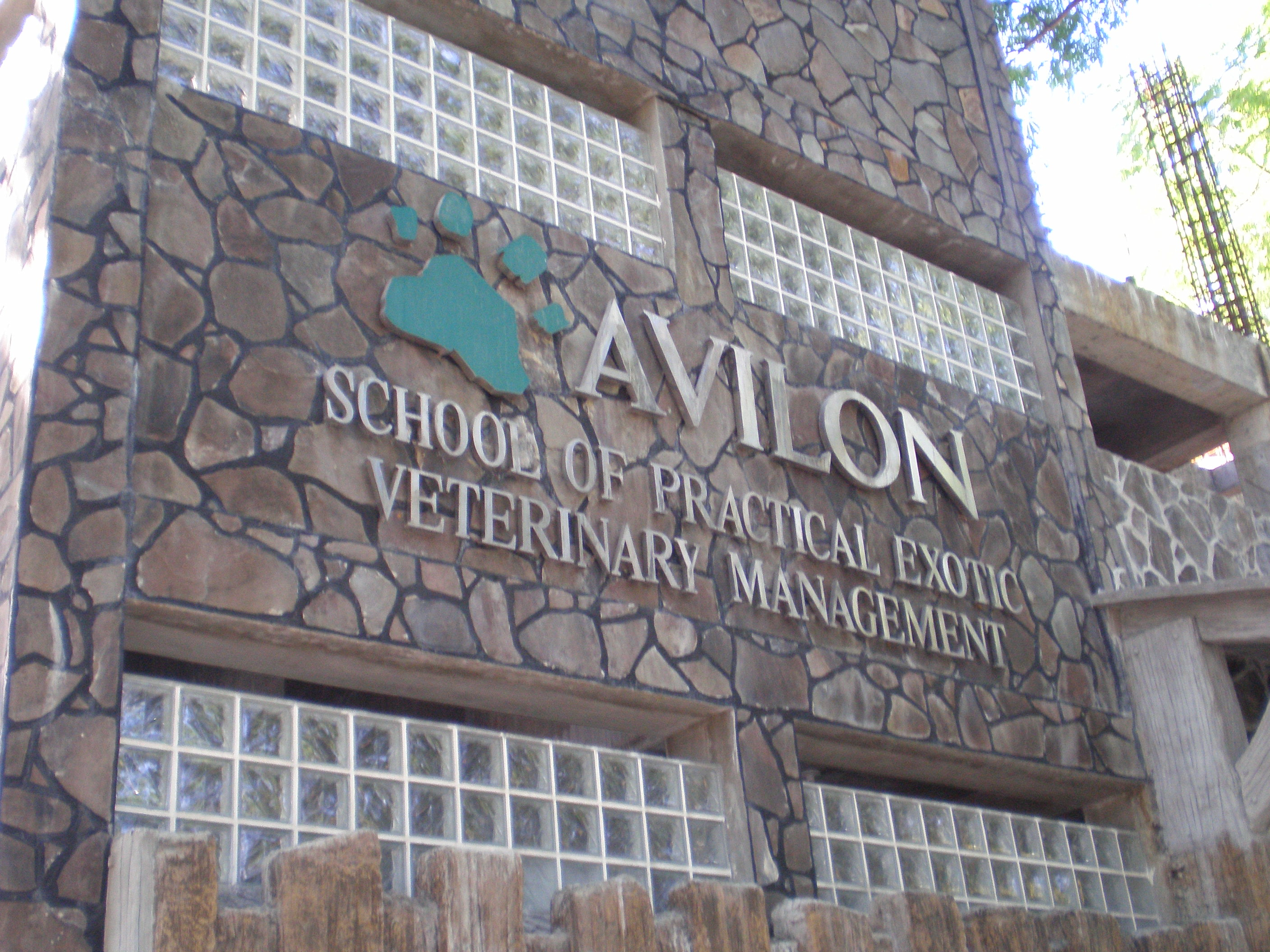
- Avilon Zoo
- Interactive map of Avilon Zoo
- 14°44′41″N 121°09′06″E
- Date opened: 2005
- Location: Barrio San Isidro, Rodriguez, Rizal, Philippines
- Land area: 7.5 hectares (19 acres)
- No. of animals: 3000
- No. of species: 600+
- Memberships: SEAZA
- Website: www.avilonzoo.ph

Avilon Zoo is a 7.5-hectare (19-acre) zoo located in Barrio San Isidro, Rodriguez, Rizal, Philippines. It is operated by the Avilon Wildlife Conservation Foundation, which also operated the Ark Avilon Zoo in Pasig.

== Zoo ==
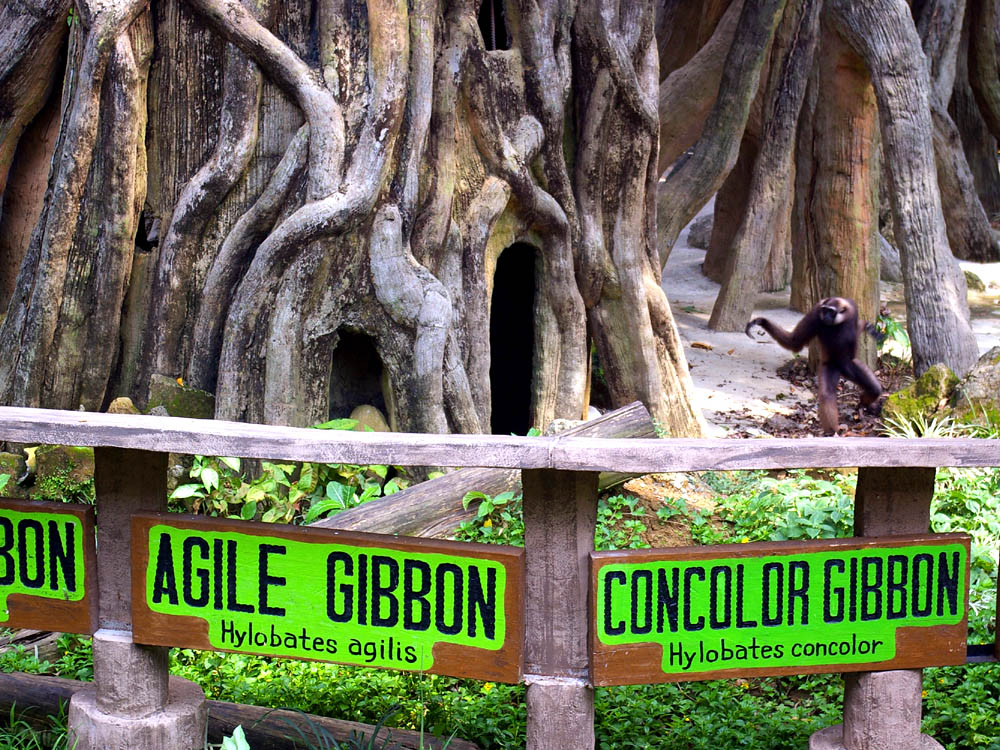
Avilon Zoo in Montalban, Rizal, Philippines

Avilon Zoo is currently the largest zoological institution in the Philippines in terms of land area and collection of animals. The 7.5-hectare (19-acre) facility located in Rodriguez, Rizal houses more than 3,000 specimens of exotic wildlife representing more than 600 species of birds, mammals, reptiles, amphibians, freshwater fishes and invertebrates. The zoo has a diverse collection of Philippine native fauna, most of which have been bred successfully in captivity through Avilon's ex situ conservation programs. Avilon Zoo is also home to a diverse collection of plants of which more than half are endemic to Philippines. Avilon Zoo aims to be one of Southeast Asia's premiere wildlife facilities.

At Avilon Zoo guided tours and educational field trips offer guests the opportunity to learn about wildlife. Conservation efforts being done to preserve threatened species and to protect the environment. Aside from the animals and exhibits, guests are encouraged to experience feeding animals like arapaimas, exotic water fowl, giant tortoises, wild horses and deer and also interact with the zoo's bunch of talented and friendly creatures.

== Ark Avilon Zoo ==
An affiliate indoor zoo known as the Ark Avilon operated in Pasig from 2008 to 2019.

== Avilon Wildlife Conservation Foundation ==
Avilon Wildlife Conservation Foundation is a non-profit organization that is committed to significantly contribute to Philippine wildlife conservation efforts through education and ex situ species preservation programs. The foundation currently runs Avilon Zoo in Rodriguez, Rizal and Ark Avilon Zoo in Pasig.

Avilon Wildlife Conservation Foundation is a member of the Southeast Asian Zoos Association (SEAZA).

== Notable conservation achievement ==
Avilon has successfully bred the Gray's monitor lizard (Varanus olivaceus) or "butaan" ex situ (in captivity). The first documented V. olivaceus successfully hatched and reared in captivity was a female named Grasya. The successful hatching was featured in Animal Planet's "BUTAAN: The Lost Dragon".
