= All Youth Channels =

Cable TN and concert management company based in Pasig, Philippines

All Youth Channels, Inc. (AYC)
- Company type: Private
- Industry: Cable television Broadcasting
- Founded: December 11, 2006; 19 years ago
- Headquarters: Silver City Mall, Pasig, Metro Manila, Philippines
- Key people: Francis Lumen (Chairman and CEO); Aileen Manzano (Programming Assistant)
- Website: www.ayc.ph

All Youth Channels, Inc. (AYC) is a cable TV and concert management company based in Pasig, Philippines. The company is currently the co-owner of cable channel Nickelodeon. AYC was also the final co-owner of MTV Philippines, which was closed down in 2010, and formerly operates two FM radio stations in Metro Manila U92 and Radio High 105.9. The current CEO is Francis Lumen, former radio executive of Nation Broadcasting Corporation.

The company's headquarters are located at Silver City, Ortigas East, Pasig.

== History ==
After the dissolution of its joint venture with NBC, MTV Networks Asia signed a licensing agreement with All Youth Channels, Inc. (AYC), which is run by some of the members of Music Source, including Lumen, to control both MTV Philippines and its sister channel, Nickelodeon. AYC owned and operated 100% of then-new MTV Philippines.

MTV Philippines was an exclusive channel on cable and satellite television systems. However, Lumen decided not to renew the contract (except Nickelodeon Philippines, MTV Philippines's sister channel). There were also some posts claiming that instead of funding for MTV Philippines, they would rather fund TV5 in which they planned to be the next big thing on TV (which later found out to be purchased by PLDT's MediaQuest Holdings, resulting to its relaunch followed by the revival of NBC-owned UHF 41 as AksyonTV, the first 24-hour Tagalog language news channel on free TV; now One Sports). 11 minutes before midnight of February 16, 2010, the final music video: Video Killed the Radio Star by The Buggles was played and afterwards, MTV Philippines officially signed off. After the closure, it had reverted to its original channel, MTV Southeast Asia. All Youth Channels previously owned two radio stations: U92 which was sold to TV5 and branded it as Radyo5 92.3 News FM (the first all-news radio station in the FM band); and Radio High 105.9 which was returned to its original owner Bright Star Broadcasting Network Corporation and branded it as Retro 105.9 DCG FM (which plays mostly modern classic and retro-styled oldies music). As of November 2024, its former radio frequencies, 92.3 FM is now operated by Philippine Collective Media Corporation as FM Radio 92.3 and 105.9 FM is now operated by TV5 Network Inc. as 105.9 True FM.

== Events ==
AYC is a producer of big-name concerts in the Philippines, even after the shut down of MTV Philippines.

=== International artists ===
- Timbaland
- Justin Timberlake
- JoJo
- Rain
- U-Kiss

=== Local artists ===
- Christian Bautista

== Partnerships and Affiliates ==
- Paramount International Networks Asia Pacific
- Nation Broadcasting Corporation
- GMA Network
- Smart Communications
- ABS-CBN Corporation
- Solar Entertainment Corporation
- TV5 Network
- Sony Pictures Television Networks Asia (AXN Philippines, Inc.)
