= MTV (Philippines, 1992–2010) =

First of 3 MTV variants in the Philippines

MTV Philippines
- Final logo used from July 2009 to February 2010
- Country: Philippines
- Broadcast area: Defunct
- Headquarters: Makati; Pasig (2001–03); Bonifacio Global City, Taguig (2003–06); Silver City Verde, Pasig (2007–10)

Programming
- Picture format: 480i (SDTV)

Ownership
- Owner: MTV Networks Asia Pacific; Nation Broadcasting Corporation (2001–06); PLDT Beneficial Trust Fund (MediaQuest Holdings) (2001–06); All Youth Channels, Inc. (2007–10)

History
- Launched: May 1992 (EEC); January 1, 2001 (NBC); March 1, 2007 (AYC, Inc.)
- Closed: April 1994 (EEC); December 31, 2006 (NBC); February 16, 2010
- Replaced by: MTV (Southeast Asia); MTV Pinoy (subscription television); Nickelodeon Philippines (subscription television); AksyonTV Channel 41 (free-to-air)

Links
- Website: Official website

MTV Philippines was a 24-hour music and entertainment television channel owned and operated by All Youth Channels, Inc., through a partnership with MTV Networks Asia Pacific that was broadcast from New Year's Day 2001 to February 16, 2010.

Prior to third and final incarnation, MTV Philippines was a corporate venture between MTV Networks Asia Pacific (which provided much of the broadcast content) and Nation Broadcasting Corporation, which provided the infrastructure.

MTV Philippines' facilities were located at the Citibank Center (now BDO Towers Valero) in Makati, The Richmonde Hotel in Ortigas Center, Pasig, The Fort in Bonifacio Global City, Taguig, and Silver City in Frontera Verde (now Ortigas East), Pasig.

== History ==
=== MTV Asia in the Philippines on UHF Channel 23 ===
MTV started in the Philippines in May 1992 as MTV Asia. It started as one of the channels of the STAR group—a partnership of MTV's parent company, Viacom and STAR TV. It began airing on UHF Channel 23 licensed to Ermita Electronics Corporation, the country's first UHF TV station fully devoted to re-broadcasting from a foreign satellite channel. In 1994, the partnership suffered a conflict of interest when STAR launched its own music channel, Channel V. After UHF 23 was put off-air in July 1996, the frequency was reassigned to ABS-CBN Corporation through a subsidiary, AMCARA Broadcasting Network, and has been rebranded as Studio 23. However, Studio 23 had to deal with the then-active agreement between Ermita Electronics and MTV Asia (whose main broadcast headquarters is located in Singapore).

=== Studio 23 ===
By October 12, 1996, MTV was being aired on Studio 23 during daytime hours, while original Studio 23 programming aired on primetime. The partnership with Studio 23 ended on December 31, 2000, and moved to a new channel frequency, UHF 41. ABS-CBN earlier launched its own music channel, Myx on November 20, 2000, and later became Studio 23's daytime block on January 1, 2001; myx would eventually become a standalone 24-hour channel the following year.

=== MTV UHF Channel 41 / MTV Philippines ===
Before 2000 was about to end, MTV Networks Asia and Nation Broadcasting Corporation (NBC) signed a joint-venture agreement to form Music Source, and acquired the rights to air MTV 24 hours a day on UHF Channel 41, which was licensed to NBC.

MTV Philippines showcased local Filipino talent through videos and shows presented in-between numbers featuring international pop and rock superstars. The channel did not promote a pan-Asian format. However, MTV Southeast Asia presented Indonesian, Malaysian and Singaporean artists on their network, alternating with international pop and rock talents. Within six months from its inception on January 1, 2001, it immediately won the hearts of pop-culturally conscious young Filipino viewers. It was said that the presence of this channel eventually caused the demise of Channel V Philippines simply due to intense competition.

After six years of partnership, UHF Channel 41 ceased broadcasting on December 31, 2006, following the dissolution of the joint venture. Soon, it was returned on TV broadcasting with a brand new channel co-owned by TV5 as Aksyon TV Channel 41, an all-news channel, which would then become 5 Plus in 2019 and now One Sports in 2020.

=== All Youth Channels, Inc. (AYC) and the final incarnation of MTV Philippines ===
After the dissolution of its joint venture with NBC, MTV Networks Asia signed a licensing agreement with AYC, which is run by some of the members of Music Source, including Lumen, to control both MTV Philippines and its sister channel, Nickelodeon. AYC owned and operated 100% of then-new MTV Philippines.

MTV Philippines was exclusive to cable and satellite television systems. However, Lumen decided not to renew the contract (except MTV's sister channel Nickelodeon). There were also some posts claiming that instead of funding for MTV Philippines, they would support TV5 instead which they planned to be the next big thing on TV. 11 minutes before midnight of February 16, 2010, a final music video: "Video Killed the Radio Star" by The Buggles, (which was the first music video played in MTV USA back in 1981) was played and afterwards, MTV Philippines officially signed off. After the closure, it had reverted to its original channel, MTV Asia.

=== MTV Pinoy ===
On February 14, 2014, MTV returned to the country as MTV Pinoy with a new logo and name. At exactly 04:00 P.M., MTV Pinoy started its commercial operations with its first program MTV Halo-Halo with VJ Sam. "Dear Lonely" performed by Zia Quizon is the first music video to air on the relaunched channel. MTV Pinoy was co-owned by MTV Networks Asia Pacific and Viva Communications, with the latter providing the infrastructure.

However, unlike its MTV Philippines format, MTV Pinoy was a domestic network focused on Filipino pop music, with programs aligned with the Viva-produced content. It struggled against the dominant network Myx, and shutdown on December 31, 2016, after a New Year's Eve countdown.

=== MTV ph ===
On August 1, 2017, MTV returned for the third and final time as MTVph, a joint venture between MTVNAP and new partner Solar Entertainment Corporation. Like the original networks, it was wholly unsuccessful, and the domestic feed ended on January 1, 2019, replaced by MTV Asia.

== Key people ==
- Bill Roedy - President, MTV Networks International
- Frank Brown - President, MTV Networks Asia Pacific
- Steven Tan - Executive Vice President, MTV Networks Asia Pacific
- Francis Lumen - President and CEO, All Youth Channels, Inc.

== Programming ==
Most of the programming consists of music or music-related shows, mainly broadcasting programming from the US-based MTV and VH1. The network also acquired original content from MTV Southeast Asia, as well as its own localized content.

== Events ==
MTV Philippines became the official music media channel of the big-name concerts to the Philippines since their re-launch.

=== International artists ===
- Christina Aguilera
- George Benson
- Chris Brown
- Duran Duran
- Fall Out Boy
- Josh Groban
- Incubus
- Alicia Keys
- Beyoncé Knowles
- Lady Gaga*
- M2M
- Ziggy Marley
- My Chemical Romance
- Nine Inch Nails
- Katy Perry*
- Pussycat Dolls
- Marion Raven
- Rihanna
- Tortured Soul
- Vertical Horizon

=== Local artists ===
- Eraserheads
- Sarah Geronimo
- Imago
- Kyla
- Martin Nievera
- Moonstar88
- Sinosikat?
- Spongecola
- Urbandub
- Gary Valenciano
- Ogie Alcasid
- Regine Velasquez

* - MTV Philippines was only the official music channel of the concert.

MTV Philippines also announced that an awards show would be in the works. In the upcoming years, the network hopes to relaunch the MTV Pilipinas Video Music Awards to continue its tradition of recognizing the best of Pinoy music and video making.

== MTV Philippines' past VJs ==
- Marc Abaya
- Kat Alano (2007–09)
- Bianca Araneta
- Victor Basa (2007–08)
- Paolo Bediones
- Reema Chanco
- KC Concepcion
- Anne Curtis (2007)
- Johan Ekedum (2003–04)
- Maike Evers
- Nicole Fonacier (2005–06)
- John Joe Joseph (2004–06)
- Cindy Kurleto
- Patty Laurel (2003–04)
- Cesca Litton
- Francis Magalona †
- Andi Manzano (2007–09)
- Sarah Meier (2001–05)
- Colby Miller (2005–07)
- KC Montero (1999–2007)
- Rex Navarrete
- Claire Olivar
- Belinda Panelo
- Don Puno
- Derek Ramsay (2001–02)
- Mariel Rodriguez
- Eiffelene Salvador
- Anna Shier (2001–03)
- Sib Sibulo
- Chase Tinio
- Giselle Toengi-Walters
- Regine Tolentino
- Shannen Torres (1997–2002)
- Donita Rose
- Jamie Wilson (1997–98)
- Maggie Wilson (2007–10)

== Partnerships/affiliations ==
- ABS-CBN Corporation
- All Youth Channels, Inc.
- Ermita Electronics Corporation
- Globe Telecom
- GMA Network Inc.
- Music Management International
- Nation Broadcasting Corporation
- Paramount Networks EMEAA
- Smart Communications
- Solar Entertainment Corporation
- Viva Communications

== See also ==
- Viacom
- Paramount International Networks
- MTV
- MTV Asia
- MTV Pinoy
- 92.3 Radyo5 True FM
- AksyonTV (defunct)
- 5 Plus (defunct)
- One Sports
- Myx
- Channel V Philippines (defunct)

== Official website ==
- MTV Philippines official website (defunct)
- MTV Asia official website
