= Jeff Rustia =

Television personality

- Born: Jose Jeffrey Rustia
- Died: 2018
- Known for: Fashion Week Founder & Executive Director, TV host, broadcaster, producer

Jeff Rustia (died 2018) was the Executive Director & Founder of TOM* Toronto Men's Fashion Week, and TW Toronto Women's Fashion Week, two of Canada's leading fashion week initiatives committed to promoting, nurturing and supporting the country's most influential designers and the Next Generation of Emerging Talent. Rustia's experience spans over 25 years in fashion, production, marketing, creative direction, and television. His career dates back to the launch of music channel Channel V (which replaced MTV on the Star TV platform) producing shows such as Fashion Police.

In the TV industry, Rustia was an executive of FRONT TV, an international broadcast design and branding agency. Under his leadership, Front TV created multicultural global design for networks like Nickelodeon (India, Asia, Europe, Africa), Discovery Channel, CPAC, APTN, HBO, CBC, and Current TV. FRONT TV was recognized as one of the first agencies in Canada to specialize in diversity.

In both the Fashion and TV industry, as a host and VJ, Rustia was known for hosting Club Fashion, a weekly national show on fashion, style icons, nightlife, and club culture on BPM:TV, Canada's 24-hour Dance Music Video Channel. Rustia has interviewed many prominent figures in fashion, entertainment, and music from Jean Paul Gaultier, Cyndi Lauper, Deborah Cox, Dita Von Teese to Fergie (Black Eyed Peas). The style program has taken Rustia to the fashion capitals of the world, New York City, London, Paris, Rome and over 38 countries and 121 cities. Rustia also hosts several BPM:TV Specials including 50 Most Fashionable Music Videos, a 5-part TV series on the world's stylish music stars and their videos.

As executive producer, Rustia developed and produced several Canadian programs, such as Pet Fashion TV, on the latest pet styles and trends, and Kol’s World, a children's animated TV series about a boy named Kol who uses a wheelchair, whose zest for life enables him to overcome any obstacle.

In 2006, Rustia received the Philippine Presidential Pamana (Legacy) Award for his achievements in the world of Media and Television, from Philippine President Gloria Macapagal Arroyo.

In 2014, he created TOM* Toronto Men's Fashion Week, an influential platform for menswear in Canada. In August 2016, he launched TW Toronto Women's Fashion Week, devoted to women's wear.

On May 17, 2018, Rustia died after a long battle with cancer.

== Early years and TV career ==
Jeff Rustia was born in Quezon City, Philippines. His early school years were spent in Cebu, Philippines, then in Jakarta Indonesia, Kuala Lumpur, Malaysia and finally, Bangkok, Thailand. His parents migrated to Canada in July 1982. Rustia grew up in Toronto where he attended elementary, high school and university. In 1992, he graduated with a 4-Years Honours Bachelor of Arts degree from the University of Toronto.

Upon graduating, he moved to Japan to become an English teacher, and it was there where he first discovered MTV Asia. A year later, Rustia applied to the music channel and got a job with Channel V, (which replaced MTV Asia on the Star TV platform). He became the first Filipino-Canadian producer and director on the network. He produced multiple international music television productions for STAR TV’s Music Channel, seen in 143 million households, across Asia, Australia and Arabia. He delivered a number of primetime TV shows and broadcast specials such as By Demand, Asia’s Video Request Show, Over the Edge, the alternative music program, Lee’s A-Z of Rock Documentary Special and Asia's First Fashion Police. He also developed and produced the primetime show Sigaw Manila, the first international music television video program about the Philippine music and entertainment scene. During his stint, he directed music luminaries Beck, Sonic Youth, Janet Jackson and even Newscorp Head Rupert Murdoch.

== Career ==
=== Creative director ===
In 1995, Jeff Rustia moved to Singapore and became a producer at HBO and Cinemax for their broadcast advertising promotions unit. In 1997, Rustia returned to Toronto and became a creative consultant for YTV, producing and redesigning the popular TV programming block, The Zone, with Phil Guerrero and Daryn Jones. After one year, he became the head of creative and marketing for two CBC-owned international networks, Trio, the 24-hour pop arts channel and Newsworld International, the 24-hour global news network. When Barry Diller of USA Networks purchased the two networks, Rustia launched FRONT TV, his own TV branding agency. FRONT created the on air branding for global networks like Nickelodeon, Discovery Channel, CTV, HBO, MTV, CBC, Current TV, TV Georgia, Vision TV, CPAC, APTN and Global TV Indonesia. FRONT TV is recognized as one of the first agencies in Canada that specializes in Diversity. Globe and Mail writes that Jeff Rustia built FRONT on the "breakthrough idea of using Canadian multiculturalism as a staple resource for branding TV networks anywhere in the world." In fact, Jeff Rustia and his diversity philosophy has been the subject of multiple textbooks in Canada, including University of Toronto and Ryerson University. Rustia is also a lecturer and speaker at TV conferences around the world on topics ranging from design to TV promotions. His speaking engagements have taken him to Rome, Seville, Munich, Seoul, L.A, New York, Mumbai, Jakarta, Manila, Kuala Lumpur, Dubai, Johannesburg and Sydney. He also conducts consultations, creative workshops and one-on-one tutorials with TV networks.

=== TV host ===
In the past 7 years, Jeff Rustia has been a TV host and VJ for BPM:TV, Canada's first and only 24-hour dance music video channel. Rustia hosts Club Fashion, a half-hour show that scours the planet for the most fashionable features, people, parties and events. He also hosts several BPM:TV Special Presentations, including the 5-part Series, 50 Most Fashionable Music Videos. He has conducted many celebrity interviews from French Fashion Designer, Jean Paul Gaultier to Canada's R&B Superstar, Deborah Cox. Rustia was the news anchor for 60 BPM, the network's 60-second music news at the top of every hour.

=== Executive producer ===
In 2012, Rustia continues to develop, produce and direct numerous TV shows. He was the executive producer and creator of Pet Fashion TV, the world's first television show that focuses on the latest pet styles and trends. He was also the creator of Kol’s World, the first children's animated TV series about a wheelchair-using boy named Kol. He also produced Vision TV's Monsoon Mela, a documentary about a women's festival that was celebrated both in India and in Canada.

== Advocacy and philanthropy ==
Rustia was the co-founder and vice president of Kol Hope Foundation for Children, the first charitable organization in North America that helps and supports children born with Trisomy-related disabilities. The foundation which was formed in 2002, was named after Jeff Rustia's son, Kol, who was born with a Trisomy 13 genetic syndrome. Kol, who died on October 9, 2011, was the inspiration and story behind the foundation. On November 11, 2011, Kol Hope Foundation for Children held its annual fundraising event at the Four Seasons Hotel in Toronto entitled, "The Most Glamorous Filipino Ball on Earth". Kol Hope has several main beneficiaries, namely, Easter Seals Canada, Sick Kids Hospital in Toronto, WorldVision Canada and 3 children's institutions, Bacolod Boys Home, Holy Infant Nursery and St. Martin De Porres School in the Philippines.
