= Ortigas East =

Mixed-use development in Pasig, Philippines

Project
- Other names: Frontera Verde
- Opening date: 2005; 21 years ago
- Developer: Ortigas & Company
- Owner: Ortigas & Company
- Website: Official website

Physical features
- Transport: 2 65 Frontera Drive; 16 18 36 39 41 50 56 59 65 Tiendesitas; 6 Ortigas Avenue; 3 Shell Julia Vargas; 4 Tiendesitas (future); Jeepneys, UV Express

Location
- Location: Ugong, Pasig, Metro Manila, Philippines

Ortigas East (formerly known as Frontera Verde, lit. 'Green Frontier') is a mixed-use development in Ugong, Pasig located in Metro Manila.

Developed by Ortigas Land, the development was launched in 2005 with the inauguration of Tiendesitas, a shopping mall which serves as its anchor establishment and whose name is often used to refer to the entire area.

== History ==
The area of Ortigas East (formerly Frontera Verde) was originally part of the Hacienda de Mandaluyon, a 4,033-hectare (9,970-acre) estate owned by the Augustinian Order until it was sold in 1920 to businessmen Dr. Frank W. Dudley and Don Francisco Ortigas. Their partnership eventually evolved into the present-day Ortigas & Company. Over the following decades, the partnership developed the Greenhills Shopping Center, the surrounding Greenhills subdivisions, and other adjacent subdivisions until their real estate expansion had slowed around 2001.

In 2005, Ortigas & Company launched a new wave of development with the opening of the Tiendesitas shopping mall on the 18.5-hectare (46-acre) Frontera Verde property.

In 2018, Ortigas & Company renamed Frontera Verde to Ortigas East as part of a long-term redevelopment and rebranding to position the estate as a mixed-use, eco-friendly estate, with plans for new office, residential, retail, and dedicating 40 percent of the estate to open and green spaces.

In 2026, the Pasig city government opened a business one-stop shop at Silver City 4, designating it as its main business application hub for transactions related to business renewal and registration.

Starting September 10, 2026, the development will also be served by the electric Love Bus service's Robinsons Galleria - Eastwood route.

== Establishments ==
=== Tiendesitas ===
Tiendesitas is a shopping mall organized into multiple "villages" showcasing Filipino products, crafts and food vendors. Opened in 2005, it has since served as an anchor establishment of Ortigas East.

=== CCF Center ===
CCF Center, also called CCF Main, is the main ministry building of evangelical megachurch Christ's Commission Fellowship. Opened in 2013, it is a 10-storey worship and training complex located on a 2.3-hectare (23,000 m^{2}) site at the northwest corner of Frontera Verde. The CCF Center includes a main auditorium with a reported capacity of approximately 10,000 seats as well as classrooms and offices. Life Academy International, a private international Christian school associated with the church, is located on the same site.

=== SM Center Pasig ===
SM Center Pasig (originally SM Supercenter Pasig) is a supermarket-anchored shopping mall that opened on August 16, 2006. Owned and managed by SM Prime, it has a total floor area of 29,017 m^{2} (2.9017 ha) and features a nature-inspired architectural design intended to complement the area.

=== Silver City ===
Silver City is a low-rise, campus‑style office district designed to accommodate corporate and business process outsourcing operations.

The district was created in 2009 when Philippine president Gloria Macapagal Arroyo designated the 50,000 m^{2} (5.0 ha) area as an Information Technology Center.

=== The Grounds ===
The Grounds is a public park established in February 2022 on the former location of the Las Farolas aquarium. It features picnic areas, pet-friendly spaces, and parking facilities for both motor vehicles and bicycles. Its first major event was held in June 2022, when the Pasig city government hosted a "Bike Fest" at The Grounds in celebration of World Bicycle Day.

== Former establishments ==
=== Ark Avilon Zoo ===
Ark Avilon Zoo was a two-storey indoor mini zoo which opened in December 2007 as a partnership between Ortigas Land and the Avilon Zoo in Rodriguez, Rizal, opened the Ark Avilon Zoo. Located on a 2,000 m^{2} (0.20 ha) lot, the zoo was housed in a structure designed to resemble Noah's Ark, drawing inspiration from both the biblical vessel and the Pet Village at Tiendesitas. The zoo closed in 2019 following the end of its lease.

=== Fun Ranch and Jump Yard ===
Fun Ranch was a family entertainment center developed by entrepreneur Vince A. Padilla in 2006 as a one-stop destination for children and families, featuring amusement rides, arcade games, and child-oriented establishments within a 5,000 m^{2} (0.50 ha) area. Among its facilities were the indoor playground Active Fun, the party venue Big Red Barn, several themed restaurants, karaoke rooms, a childcare center, and a spa catering to children.

In January 2016, the group behind Fun Ranch opened Jump Yard, the first and largest indoor trampoline park in the Philippines. Located in the Children's Corridor, the facility features approximately 5,000 m^{2} (0.50 ha) of interconnected trampolines, including areas for dodgeball, basketball, and cage ball, as well as a foam pit and balance beam. Jump Yard was developed after the owners' family observed similar trampoline parks abroad and sought to introduce the concept locally.

In June 2020, amid the COVID-19 lockdown in the Philippines, both Fun Ranch and Jump Yard permanently ceased operations.

=== Las Farolas ===
Las Farolas, officially Las Farolas: The Fish World, was a former freshwater fish aquarium which opened in April 2013. The aquarium ceased operations in September 2016.

== Transportation ==
Ortigas East is located at the intersection of Ortigas Avenue and Circumferential Road 5 (C-5), with secondary access via Julia Vargas Avenue, a four- to six-lane arterial road that connects the estate to Ortigas Center and surrounding commercial districts.

Public transportation access is provided mainly by bus and jeepney routes operating along Ortigas Avenue and C-5, which connect the estate to Pasig, Quezon City, Mandaluyong, and other parts of Metro Manila.

Ortigas East is planned to be served by the proposed infill Tiendesitas station of the east-west MRT Line 4, which is expected to run along Ortigas Avenue.
