= Front TV =

Canadian broadcast and branding design firm

Front TV was an international broadcast design and branding firm that catered to television, film and interactive media sectors. The firm originally specialized in creative thinking, network branding, station IDs, film titles, 2D/3D animation, web, print, and sound design. It expanded its operations in 2009, launching its own TV production arm. Front TV's main headquarters, TV studio, animation and post production facilities were originally located in Toronto, Ontario.

Front TV was founded in 1999 by Jeff Rustia. Its first client was Nickelodeon Philippines, for whom it created several network ID's & on-air promos. Subsequently, Front TV would pursue projects for other Nickelodeon channels in Malaysia, Spain, and India. The firm also went on to produce visual content and commercials for international networks such as HBO Asia and Cinemax, Current TV, CBC and Disney Channel. Front TV's clients included the Republic of Georgia's public broadcaster Georgian Public Broadcaster, Indonesia's national channel Global TV, Vision TV (Canada's multi-faith religious channel), Aboriginal Peoples Television Network (APTN), QTN, (an American gay and lesbian channel), CPAC (Canada's political television), Ichannel (Issues Channel) and The Pet Network (a 24-hour pet channel).

Front TV's Facebook account was last updated in September 2013; during that same month, the front.tv domain name expired.
