= Nickelodeon (Philippines) =

Television network in the Philippines

- Logo used since 2023 (Note: The logo's wordmark has been in use since March 15, 2010 in the Philippines. Additionally, there is a variant meant to be used for white backgrounds; the main variant has a white wordmark in conjunction with a fully orange splat.)
- Country: Philippines

Programming
- Picture format: 1080i HDTV (downscaled to 16:9 480i for the SDTV feed)

Ownership
- Owner: Paramount Networks EMEAA (Skydance Corporation); All Youth Channels
- Parent: Nickelodeon Group
- Sister channels: MTV 90s; Nick Jr.; Comedy Central; MTV Live HD; Paramount Network

History
- Launched: October 5, 1998 (as Nickelodeon Southeast Asia); April 1, 2011 (as a Philippine feed)
- Replaced: Nickelodeon (Southeast Asia) (Philippines only); MTV Philippines (2007–2010)

Links
- Website: nick.com

Availability

Terrestrial
- Sky Cable Metro Manila: Channel 45
- Cignal TV Nationwide: Channel 72
- SatLite Nationwide: Channel 83

Nickelodeon is a Philippine pay television channel that was launched on April 1, 2011, as a localized variant of American channel Nickelodeon, with programming aimed at children and teenagers. It is owned by Paramount Networks EMEAA in partnership with All Youth Channels. Upon its launch, it replaced the Southeast Asian feed of Nickelodeon in the Philippines, which used to be distributed in the country since its launch in 1998.

On October 11, 2006, Viacom's then subsidiary MTV Networks Asia Pacific set up a new unit to manage Nickelodeon's southeast Asia operations. On April 1, 2011, MTV Networks launched a dedicated Filipino Nickelodeon channel.

== History ==
=== Background ===
An hour-long Nickelodeon television program premiered on People's Television Network (PTV) in the Philippines on April 10, 1989; it featured the segment Mr. Wizard's World, among others. Nickelodeon was then part of PTV's block from 1989 to 1992.

=== 1998–2011: As part of Nickelodeon Southeast Asia ===
In October 1998, Nickelodeon decided to reach the popular channel to the Philippines, Japan and Russia as an attempt to bring the popular channel to Asia. One of their shorts were Right Here, Right Now (based on the 1993 Nick USA shorts) and their IDs were by FRONT. In 2003, it became a part of Nicksplat (Nickelodeon's headquarters in Asia).

On October 11, 2006, Viacom's subsidiary MTV Networks Asia Pacific set up a new unit to manage Nickelodeon (Southeast Asia) TV based in Singapore. Nickelodeon was launched in Singapore and expanded its services in Southeast Asia, South Asia, and Polynesia. Nickelodeon Philippines, Nickelodeon Pakistan, and Nickelodeon India started working independently. They started their new website in 2003.

On March 15, 2010, Nickelodeon revamped their logo same as the United States and worldwide and started broadcasting newer Nickelodeon shows from the United States that represents the new Nickelodeon logo and airs latest episodes of current Nick shows.

=== 2011–present: Nickelodeon Philippines ===
On April 1, 2011, the Nickelodeon Asia feed was replaced with a dedicated Filipino Nickelodeon channel, although it will still use the Nick-Asia branding used in other countries. On April 11, 2011, the lineup was changed prior to Nickelodeon Southeast Asia. The new schedule will put live-action programs in the primetime slot and will double the Nick Jr. block.

Nickelodeon celebrated the release of the new channel on April 9, 2011, at the Bonifacio Global City Open Field, Taguig, with the event entitled, "Nick World". The event included mascots of notable Nicktoon characters with storytelling, an animals show, martial arts performances and a world of exciting attractions, booths, and modules for kids.

Starting on May 23, 2011, the lineup of Nickelodeon changed wherein they ceased airing the Nick Jr. block in the afternoon timeslot to make way for live-action shows and miscellaneous NickToons programs. This lineup will double the TeenNick block which only runs in the evening and other animated shows that only airs once a day.

In 2012, Nickelodeon uses new graphics used in the US and UK, but only applies to selected programs' promos and station IDs. The former Nick-Asia graphics is still used.

In 2013, Nickelodeon Philippines introduced Hapon Hangout, a Nickelodeon hour special that starts at 4:00 pm to 6:30 pm every weekdays.

On July 17, 2017, the channel was rebranded into the US version. It was made by Superestudio, an Argentinian branding agency.

On August 1, 2023, the channel, along with most Nickelodeon feeds globally, started to use the Splat 2023 branding.

== Nickelodeon Philippines Kids Choice Awards ==
The Philippines Kids Choice Awards is the second setting of the Kids Choice Awards in Asia preceded by Indonesia. The show was first held since 2008 at the Aliw Theater in Pasay and was first hosted by Michael V. with some various Filipino artists. Nickelodeon, an American cable television network, brought Kids' Choice Awards to the Philippines in an effort to strengthen its presence in Asia. According to Amit Jain, executive vice-president and managing director of MTV Networks India, China and Southeast Asia, "This is a milestone for Nickelodeon's business in Southeast Asia as it will deliver on Nick's commitment of providing global kids-centric shows and properties which are adapted to reflect local tastes and aspirations." The Philippines KCA has been inactive all over the years.

Nowadays, it was revived as a category representing the Philippines.

== Nickelodeon on free-to-air television ==
Prior to the launch of Nickelodeon Philippines in the fall of 1998, Nickelodeon first aired in the country as a block of the free-to-air state-owned TV channel PTV from 1989 to 1992. The block used to air in the mornings and afternoons consisted mostly of drama-related programs, educational programs, and game shows. Then, it moved to New Vision 9/RPN from 1992 to 1998, and again from 2002 to 2006 as RPN. During that time, GMA purchased the rights to air Rugrats and selected Nick Jr. shows (including Blue's Clues and Dora the Explorer) from 1998 to 2006.

Both RPN and GMA lost the broadcasting rights of Nickelodeon shows to ABC on May 1, 2006. Later rebranded as TV5, Nick shows were later dubbed for the first time to Filipino on August 11, 2008 (except for Go, Diego, Go!), making it the first national network to do so. The network ended its contract with Nickelodeon on June 30, 2010, months after it was purchased by PLDT's MediaQuest Holdings from the Cojuangco group and Malaysian media conglomerate Media Prima, which caused a major, permanent reshuffle in TV5's programming. Yo Gabba Gabba! was the only Nick program retained by TV5; although produced by Nickelodeon, it wasn't dubbed into Filipino as the contract had already expired. SpongeBob SquarePants was also aired on Q (GMA Network's former affiliate) every weekday mornings until February 18, 2011, when the channel was discontinued to relaunch as GMA News TV (now GTV), a news-oriented channel.

In 2010, ABS-CBN brought the rights to air Nickelodeon shows. The network launched Nick Time (later renamed Nickelodeon on ABS-CBN) on July 26, 2010, airing every weekday mornings. Nickelodeon shows such as Dora the Explorer, SpongeBob SquarePants, The Adventures of Jimmy Neutron, Boy Genius, and Avatar: The Last Airbender among others are shown during Nick Time, thus continuing the Filipino dub that was started by TV5. However, ABS-CBN's airing of Nickelodeon's shows was criticized for having the majority of its episodes edited due to time constraints, heavy advertising gaps, and ABS-CBN's importance to movies, sports, and local programming. Studio 23 (ABS-CBN's former affiliate) launched Nickelodeon on Studio 23 on October 4, 2010. Similar to its mother network ABS-CBN, the programs are dubbed in Tagalog. Studio 23 aired Catscratch, which premiered in August 2011. Three years later, the Nickelodeon on Studio 23 block ended on January 16, 2014, to give way for the channel's relaunch as S+A (now Aliw 23), a sports-oriented channel. To facilitate a smooth transition to the new channel, Nickelodeon shows were placed in S+A's 'Action Kids' block on January 20, 2014, and all of its programs were reverted to their original English language rather than being dubbed into Filipino. The block was cancelled in early January 2015 when the launch of ABS-CBN's digital black box was later introduced. Nickelodeon last aired on ABS-CBN on May 3, 2020, two days before the National Telecommunications Commission issued a cease-and-desist order due to the expiration of ABS-CBN's legislative broadcasting franchise, thus temporarily stopping the free-to-air activities of ABS-CBN and S+A.

On Yey!, a digital channel of ABS-CBN TV Plus, aired Nickelodeon and Nick Jr. shows under the Nickelodeon sa Yey! block every morning from Mondays to Sundays until 2020. All programs were in Filipino-dubbed audio, with the exception of some shows like Peppa Pig. In 2017, Yey! launched The Loud House and Harvey Beaks for the first time. The next few years, they also aired The Fairly OddParents and The Mighty B!. The channel permanently ceased broadcasting on July 1, 2020, due to the alias cease-and-desist order (ACDO) issued against ABS-CBN TV Plus.

On September 30, 2024, SpongeBob SquarePants resumed airing on TV5, marking its return to the network after 14 years and Nickelodeon's return to free-to-air television after a four-year hiatus. This coincided with the series' 25th anniversary. The show ended on April 19, 2025, to give way for The Adventures of Puss in Boots as its replacement.

== Programming ==
Nickelodeon airs new programs and episodes of current Nick shows every two to seven months after the US broadcast, but sometimes it takes a year. The program lineup is different from the Nick-Asia feed where live-action programs are aired twice in the afternoon and evening and the Nick Jr. block runs longer. Original Nickelodeon and Nick Jr. Channel titles still remain in the channel.

=== Programming blocks ===
Current programming in Nickelodeon Philippines (also in Southeast Asia) has often been segmented into blocks.

- Nick Jr. on Nickelodeon (Every day, 8 am – 11:30 am) is a preschool block that airs children oriented programs. The programming block is now available as a channel in the Philippines on Sky Cable Channel 103, G Sat channel 22 and was recently added on Cignal's channel 77. The block airs Paw Patrol, Blaze and the Monster Machines, and many more.

==== Former blocks ====
- TEENick was a programming block that airs current live-action programs. This doesn't exist anymore in the channel, this is due to the fact that the TeenNick shows are aired along with Nickelodeon.
- Weekend Express was a programming block that runs every weekends at noon. The block airs programs according to a weekly theme. The block ended on June 26, 2011, together with Nickelodeon (Southeast Asia).
- Lunch Toons was a limited time Nicktoons based block which shows one random Nicktoon which is themed about a certain food.
- Hapon Hangout was a former block in the afternoon that debuted in February 2013 which aired mostly cartoons and live-action. It ended in December 2017.
- G Time (Mondays to Fridays/Weekends, 4 pm – 6 pm) was a programming block that airs animated and live-action series.
- Flick Picks (Fridays and Sundays, 6 pm) was a programming block that airs movies.

=== Short segments ===
- Nicktoons was a segment that aired songs from Nicktoons shows. NickToons only appeared in commercial breaks. The segment underwent hiatus from late 2011 to April 2, 2012. The segment included songs from SpongeBob SquarePants, The Fairly OddParents, Back at the Barnyard and many others.
- Turn It Up is a music segment that shows songs, It mostly shows American songs and K-pop.
- Me TV was an interstitional show about children from all over the world. The show aired from 1998 to 2001.

== See also ==
- Nickelodeon
- Nickelodeon (Asia)
