= List of programs broadcast by Dubai One =

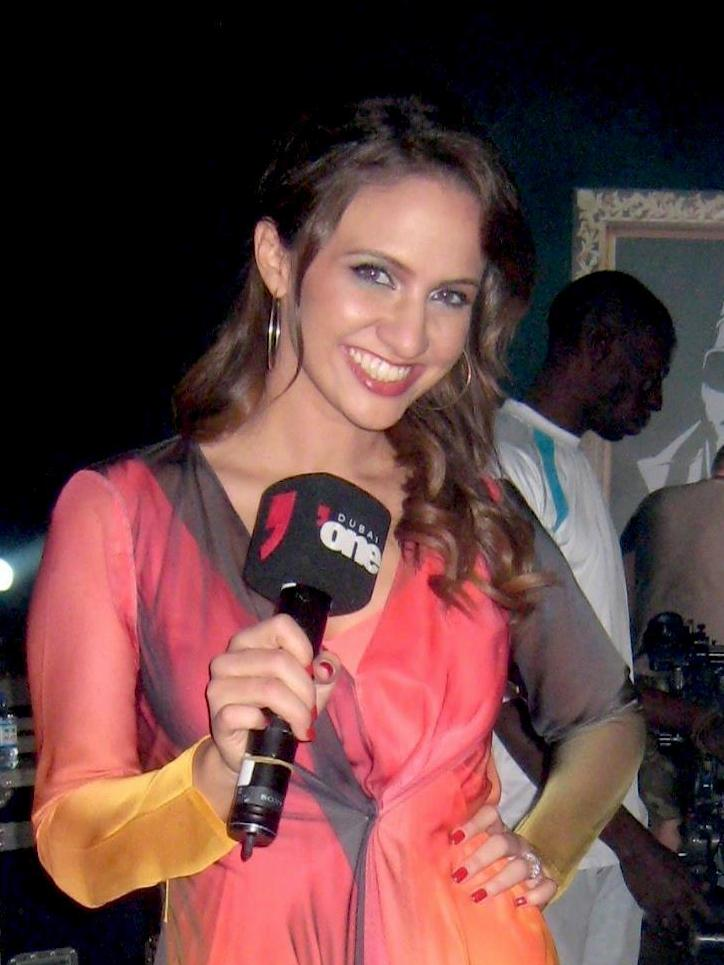
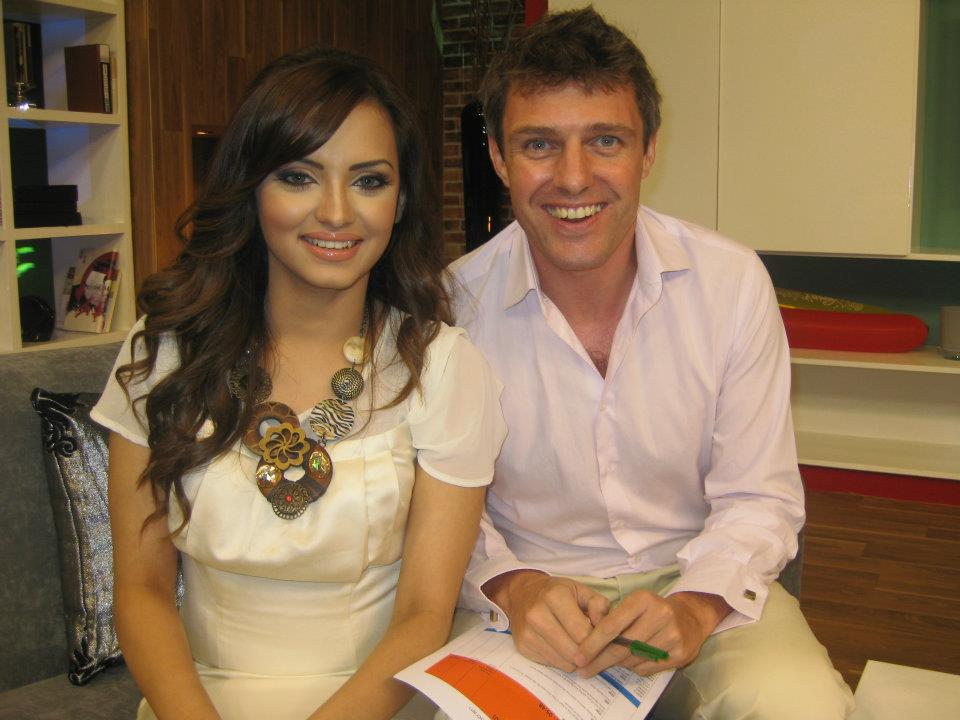
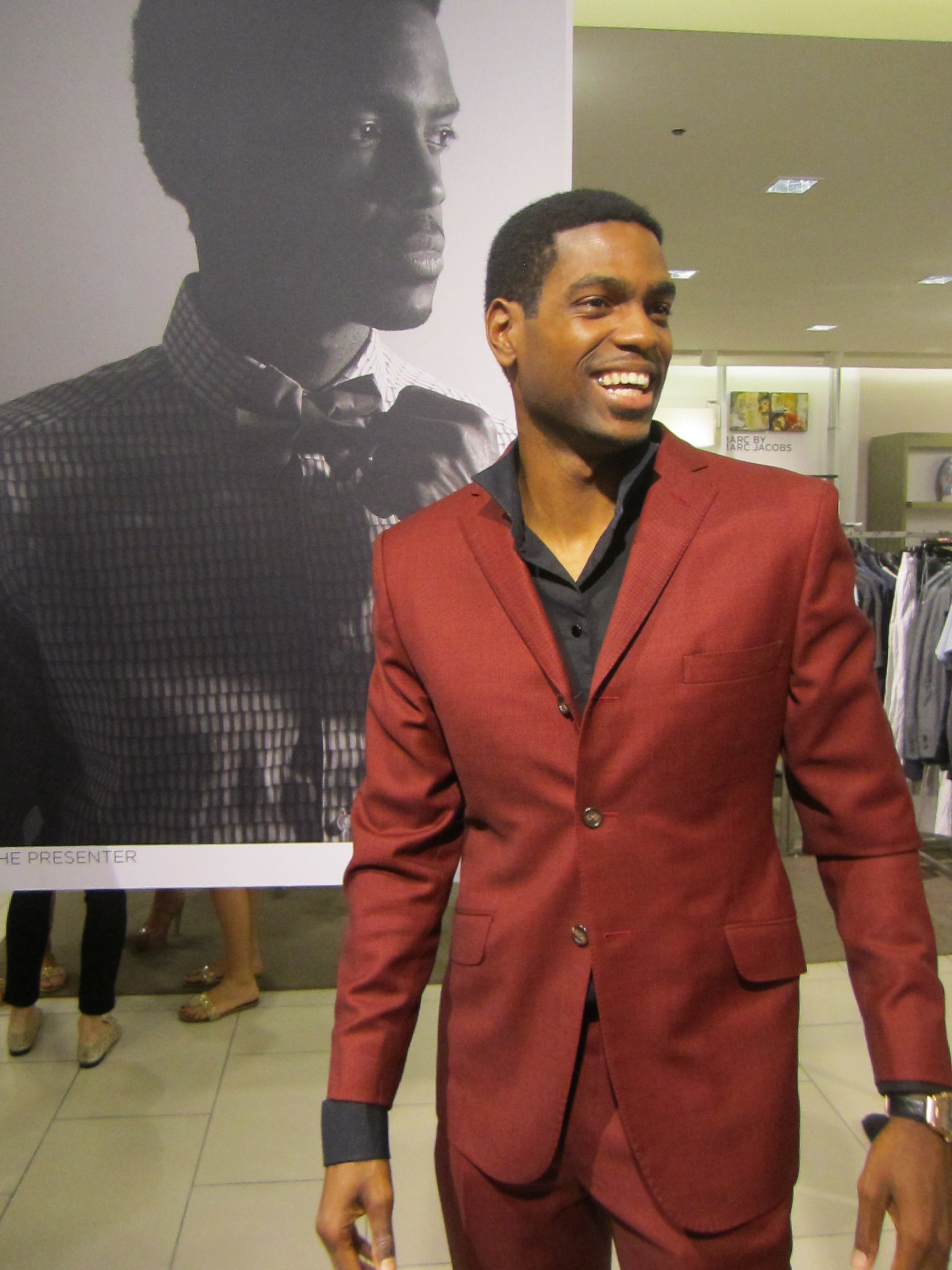
From left to right, Dina Butti, Aishwarya Ajit, Tom Urquhart and Layne Redman, hosts of some Dubai One shows

This is a list of television programs currently or formerly broadcast by Dubai One and its predecessors Ch33 and One TV. Titles are listed in alphabetical order.

== News and current affairs ==
- Dubai Eye on One (since 2020, simulcast from Dubai Eye 103.8)
- Emirates News (since 2006)
- DXB Today (since 2023)

== Dramas and comedies ==
=== United States ===
- 18 Wheels of Justice
- The 45 Rules of Divorce
- Airwolf
- The A-Team
- Agents of S.H.I.E.L.D.
- Are You Afraid of the Dark?
- Beauty and the Beast
- Benson
- Beverly Hills, 90210
- The Big Bang Theory
- The Bill Engvall Show
- Blood & Oil
- The Bold and the Beautiful
- Boy Meets World
- Brotherly Love
- City Guys
- Cleopatra 2525
- Close to Home (2009)
- Cobra
- The Colbys
- Cosby
- The Cowboys
- Curb Your Enthusiasm
- Dallas
- Dave's World
- Diff'rent Strokes
- Dinosaurs
- Doogie Howser, M.D.
- Dr. Quinn, Medicine Woman
- Dynasty
- Early Edition
- Empty Nest
- Everwood
- Everybody Loves Raymond
- Falcon Crest
- The Flash
- The Fresh Prince of Bel-Air
- Friends
- Gilligan's Island
- The Golden Girls
- Gossip Girl
- The Gregory Hines Show
- Happy Hour
- Head of the Class
- Hercules: The Legendary Journeys
- Here and Now
- Home Improvement
- Hope & Faith
- Jack of All Trades
- The Jeffersons
- The King of Queens
- Knight Rider
- Kung Fu: The Legend Continues
- Knots Landing
- Life Goes On
- MacGyver
- Magnum, P.I.
- Malcolm & Eddie
- Manimal
- Melrose Place
- Murder, She Wrote
- My Perfect Family
- Miss Farah
- The New Adventures of Old Christine
- Night Court
- Newton's Cradle
- Once Upon a Time
- Out of This World
- The Parent 'Hood
- Queen of Hearts
- Quantum Leap
- Red Band Society
- Reign
- Remington Steele
- Renegade
- Power Rangers
- Saved by the Bell
- Scarecrow and Mrs. King
- Seinfeld
- The Sinbad Show
- Sliders
- Smallville
- Small Wonder
- Smart Guy
- The Sopranos
- The Steve Harvey Show
- Street Hawk
- The Simpsons
- Supernatural
- S.W.A.T.
- Team Knight Rider
- Teen Wolf
- Twin Peaks
- USA High
- Veronica Mars
- Walker, Texas Ranger
- The Whispers
- The Wonder Years

=== Other countries ===
- The 45 Rules of Divorce
- Are You Afraid of the Dark?
- The Adventures of Sinbad
- Brazil Avenue
- Chakravartin Ashoka Samrat
- Dastaan-E-Mohabbat Salim Anarkali
- Doctor Who
- Due South
- Hey Dad..!
- Highlander: The Series
- Hustle
- İntikam
- Jhansi Ki Rani
- Jodha Akbar
- Keeping Up Appearances
- Kung Fu: The Legend Continues
- Mr. Bean
- Miss Farah
- Naagin
- Neighbours
- Newton's Cradle
- Razia Sultan
- Ekaterina
- Aik Nayee Cinderella
- Rossella
- Power Rangers
- Swarajyajanani Jijamata
- Swarajyarakshak Sambhaji
- Muhteşem Yüzyıl (aired under Hareem Al Sultan name)
- lacasa de pepel
- Aladdin – Naam Toh Suna Hoga
- Catherine the Great
- The Romanovs
- La casa de papel
- The Golden Horde
- Godunov
- Taj: Divided by Blood
- Raskol
- Badshah Begum
- Peter the Great: The Testament
- Elizaveta
- Derecho a soñar
- Sobor
- Grigoriy R.
- Peshawa Bajirao

== Children's series ==
=== Animated series ===
- 1001 Nights
- 2 Stupid Dogs
- The Adventures of Blinky Bill
- The Adventures of Paddington Bear
- Adventures of Sonic the Hedgehog
- The Adventures of Super Mario Bros. 3
- The Adventures of Teddy Ruxpin
- The Adventures of Tintin
- Aladdin
- The Amazing Adventures of Morph
- Andy Panda
- Animaniacs
- Angry Birds Toons
- Angry Birds Blues
- Angry Birds Stella
- Anne of Green Gables
- Ant-Man
- Arthur
- Avenger Penguins
- The Avengers: Earth's Mightiest Heroes
- Avengers Assemble
- Babar
- Baby Looney Tunes
- The Baby Huey Show
- Bad Dog
- Batman: The Animated Series
- Beany and Cecil
- Beethoven
- Beetlejuice
- Biker Mice from Mars
- Billy the Cat
- Bimble's Bucket
- Bionic Six
- BlackStar
- Blazing Dragons
- Bob Morane
- Bonkers
- Bucky O'Hare and the Toad Wars
- The Busy World of Richard Scarry
- Captain Planet and the Planeteers
- Challenge of the GoBots
- Channel Umptee-3
- Chilly Willy
- Chip 'n Dale Rescue Rangers
- Count Duckula
- Creepy Crawlies
- Cro
- Danger Mouse
- Defenders of the Earth
- Dennis the Menace
- Dennis the Menace and Gnasher
- Denver, the Last Dinosaur
- Dink, the Little Dinosaur
- Dog City
- DragonFlyz
- Dr. Zitbag's Transylvania Pet Shop
- DuckTales
- Earthworm Jim
- ExoSquad
- Family Dog
- Fantastic Four
- Fantomcat
- Fat Albert and the Cosby Kids
- Fireman Sam
- Free Willy
- Fudge
- G.I. Joe: A Real American Hero
- Godzilla: The Series
- Go Go Gophers
- Goof Troop
- Gummi Bears
- Guardians of the Galaxy
- Hammerman
- The Hot Rod Dogs and Cool Car Cats
- Hulk and the Agents of S.M.A.S.H.
- Iron Man
- Jumanji
- Kampung Boy
- The Karate Kid
- Kid vs Kat
- Kimba the White Lion
- Kipper
- The Legends of Treasure Island
- Little Bear
- The Magician
- M.A.S.K.
- The Mask: The Animated Series
- Masha and the Bear
- Mighty Ducks
- Monster Force
- The Moomins
- Mortal Kombat: Defenders of the Realm
- The Mozart Band
- Mr. Bogus
- Mr. Hiccup
- My Little Pony
- My Little Pony Tales
- The Looney Tunes Show
- The New Adventures of Winnie the Pooh
- Oggy and the Cockroaches
- Oscar's Orchestra
- Pigeon Street
- Pingu
- The Pink Panther
- Pink Panther and Pals
- Piggy Tales
- Pippi Longstocking
- Police Academy
- Popeye and Son
- Popples
- Problem Child
- The Raggy Dolls
- ReBoot
- Redwall (~2000)
- Road Rovers
- Robinson Sucroe
- The Rocky and Bullwinkle Show
- Roger Ramjet
- Rude Dog and the Dweebs
- Rupert
- Saber Rider and the Star Sheriffs
- Sandokan
- Savage Dragon
- Sharky & George
- Sky Commanders
- South Park
- Spider-Man
- Space Goofs
- Space Racers
- The Spooktacular New Adventures of Casper
- Spunky and Tadpole
- Stunt Dawgs
- The Super Mario Bros. Super Show!
- Super Mario World
- SuperTed
- Centurions
- The Sylvester & Tweety Mysteries
- Taz-Mania
- Teenage Mutant Ninja Turtles
- Timon & Pumbaa
- Tiny Toon Adventures
- Tom & Jerry Kids
- The Transformers
- Ultimate Spider-Man
- Underdog
- The Legend of Calamity Jane
- The Magic Ball
- The Real Ghostbusters
- The Toothbrush Family
- The Undersea Adventures of Captain Nemo
- The Untouchables of Elliot Mouse
- Victor and Hugo
- Vor-Tech: Undercover Conversion Squad
- Where on Earth Is Carmen Sandiego?
- Widget, the World Watcher
- Wild West C.O.W.-Boys of Moo Mesa
- Wisdom of the Gnomes
- Wish Kid
- Where's Wally?
- Woody Woodpecker
- The Wuzzles
- Yo Yogi!
- Young Hercules
- Crocadoo
- Kim Possible
- Poochini
- Sagwa, the Chinese Siamese Cat
- The Marvelous Misadventures of Flapjack
- Kral Şakir
- Chowder
- Eliot Kid
- SpongeBob SquarePants
- Foster's Home for Imaginary Friends
- Ben 10
- The Powerpuff Girls

=== Other series/shows ===
- 3-2-1 Contact
- Animal Shelf
- Art Attack
- Barney & Friends
- Beakman's World
- Bill Nye the Science Guy
- Brum
- Critter Gitters
- The Dooley and Pals Show
- Dynamo Duck
- Fraggle Rock
- Ghostwriter
- The Great Space Coaster
- Groundling Marsh
- Jay Jay the Jet Plane
- Kratts' Creatures
- Let's Read... With Basil Brush
- Mr. Men Show
- Noddy's Toyland Adventures
- Oakie Doke
- Ocean Girl
- Polka Dot Shorts
- Pumuckl
- Ramona
- Sesame Street
- Size Small
- Skippy the Bush Kangaroo
- Space Cases
- Spellbinder
- Square One Television
- Sunshine Factory
- Super Gran
- Tales of the Tooth Fairies
- Theodore Tugboat
- Wimzie's House
- Wishbone

== Reality and game shows ==
- America's Funniest Home Videos
- Blockbusters
- The Crystal Maze
- Zero Hour
- Fashion Star
- I Shouldn't Be Alive
- Give Us a Clue
- Pussycat Dolls Present
- Terror Towers
- What Would You Do?
- The X Factor

== Variety and lifestyle shows ==
- Ask One (2010)
- Bonds for Life (2009)
- The Carol Burnett Show
- Emirates 24/7 (2010–2014)
- Expo 2020 Dubai
- Expo 2020 Dubai: Infinite Nights
- Chef Tell
- City Wrap (Ramadan 2011–2013)
- Dubai 101 (2009-2011)
- Dubai One Minute
- Emirati (2009)
- Healthy, Wealthy and Wise
- Hollywood on Set (2023-present)
- Guy in Dubai (2023-present, imported from Amazon Prime)
- Her Say (2010)
- Out & About This Week (2010-2014)
- Studio One (2011-2014)
- That's Entertainment (2011-2014)
- Twenty Something (2009-2011)
- The London Show (2019-2020)
- Yan Can Cook
- World of Movies (2023-present)

== Others ==
- 2004 Zee Cine Awards
- Ripley's Believe It or Not!
- Understanding Islam (2011-2014)
- World of Sports

== See also ==
- Dubai One
- Dubai Media Incorporated
- Television in the United Arab Emirates
- List of television programs
