= Studio One (Emirati TV program) =

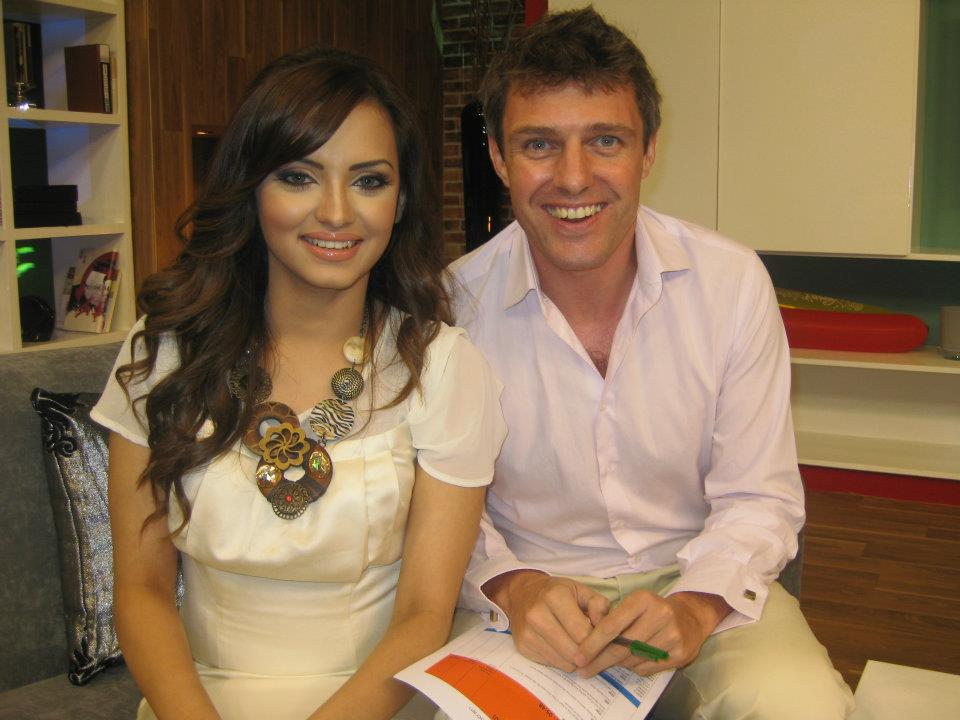
- Ash and Tom on the set of Studio One
- Directed by: Rima Yahfouf (Season 1–current); David Coyle (Season 1); Ehab Noor (Season 1–current)
- Presented by: Tom Urquhart; Aishwarya Ajit
- Country of origin: United Arab Emirates
- No. of seasons: 4
- No. of episodes: 605

Production
- Executive producers: Yara Awad (Seasons 1–3); Robert Hillier (Season 1)
- Producers: Ray Addison (season 1-current); Faraz Javed (Season 1)
- Running time: 60 mins (Season 1); 30 mins (Season 2–4)
- Production companies: Dubai Media Incorporated; Dubai One

Original release
- Network: Dubai One
- Release: 12 January 2011 – 11 March 2014

Studio One is a live daily English-language lifestyle television program that originated from United Arab Emirates and was broadcast on Dubai One to 16 countries in the Middle East and North Africa. It aired from January 2011 to March 2014. Created by the same team that produced Dubai One's popular weekly television program Ask One, Studio One is known for its eclectic mix of lifestyle features and celebrity interviews, interactivity and is primarily aimed at women and families. Season One was hosted by Tom Urquhart and Saba Wahid. At the end of the first season Saba left the show and was replaced by former show reporter Aishwarya Ajit. Studio One has been described as Dubai One's flagship show.

== History ==
Studio One evolved from Dubai One's successful weekly television program Ask One which first aired in September 2010. Ask One was pre-recorded and broadcast weekly at 19:30 on Tuesday nights and featured a mix of real-life stories, interviews, reports, investigations and a regular cookery segment. On 28 December it was announced that from 12 January Ask One would be renamed Studio One and become a live, daily television program. There were sixteen episodes of the original series.

Season One of Studio One began on 12 January 2011, with Urquhart and Wahid returning from the Christmas break. The new format featured a number of significant changes from Ask One, including a new set, title sequence, graphics, music and reporters.

Other regular features included live performances, reports from destinations around Dubai and fashion segments on Mondays and Thursdays. Additionally Thursday's had more of a food focus featuring the Mystery Bag Challenge and co-host Saba Wahid preparing one of her own recipes in the 'Quick Foodie Fix'.

On 2 May 2011 Studio One broadcast its 100th episode with a live television link up with a party at Dubai Festival City. The first season finished on 30 June after 120 episodes.

Season Two began on Sunday 25 September 2011 with the new presenting line-up, new half-hour format, bigger set and a range of new features including The West Wing and Winning Lines.

On Monday 23 January Studio One broadcast its 200th episode.

Season Three began on Sunday 30 September with a week of love broadcasts on location from Jumeirah Zabeel Saray on The Palm before returning to a new studio set located in Dubai Studio City.

Season Four began on Sunday 8 September with a re-vamped set and increased interactive.

== Team ==
Hosts

- Tom Urquhart (seasons 1–4)
- Saba Wahid (Season 1)
- Aishwarya Ajit (Seasons 2–4)

Relief hosts

- Aishwarya Ajit (season 1)
- Dina Butti (season 2)

Reporters

- Jessica Barder (Season 1)
- Aishwarya Ajit (Season 1)
- Dina Butti (Seasons 1–3)
- Elham Al Hamaddi (Season 2–4)

=== Tom Urquhart (seasons 1–4) ===
Tom Urquhart is a British journalist, television presenter and radio presenter currently based in the Middle East. He is known for presenting the only live English-language lifestyle program in the region; Studio One and for broadcasting on 103.8FM Dubai Eye.

After studying English at university in the UK, Tom worked on several British newspaper titles including a daily broadsheet in London before moving to Dubai in 2001. After a brief stint in PR he became Deputy Editor of What’s On for Motivate Publishing and Editor at Large for the launch of Hello Middle East.

It was at Motivate that Urquhart started working in local radio, providing a regular entertainment slot for Emirates Radio 1 and 2 called What’s on Tom? He then went on to host the morning program (The Good Life) for the re-launch of Dubai Eye 103.8, the first English-language talk radio station in the UAE. From there he moved to the evening drive time slot where he oversaw the launch of the stations Sport Talk television program as presenter and executive producer.

A move into television soon followed. He was chosen as host for City 7's Good Morning Dubai program, the first live English language breakfast show in the UAE. He has also been featured in a Discovery Channel feature on Dubai, A Place in the Sun from the UK, and Lonely Planet does Dubai. Tom featured as a regular pundit on the first season of Dubai One's weekly sports show World of Sports before taking over as Host for the second and final season.

Urquhart has contributed to a number of publications in the UK and Middle East including CNN, The National and Jumeirah Magazine writing about a range of topics including architecture, horse racing and rugby. In 2006 he was the editor of Dubai Sports City Newsletter.

Urquhart has hosted a number of large events in the UAE including the opening of Sheikh Zayed Bridge by Queen Elizabeth II, the launch of sports newspaper Sport 360°, the Emirates Airline Tee Party, Jumeirah Festival of Taste, the Lancashire Cricket Dinner, the launch of Virgin Atlantic in Dubai, the Cartier International Polo event, the Abu Dhabi Chequered Flag Ball and Chef's For Japan. Additionally Tom regularly commentates on Polo matches and has been described by British Polo Today as "The voice of Polo in Dubai".

He is currently the face of Emirate's Airline's latest campaign, hosts The Grill on Dubai Eye and lists his favourite place in Dubai as the "finishing line at Nad Al Sheba".

=== Aishwarya Ajit (seasons 2–4) ===
Ash's media career started in India at 18 where she worked as a photo shoot model and started to build up a following for her work. She then moved into television hosting Asianet's hit dance reality program Vodafone Thakadhimi, lifestyle magazine television program CityLights and the Malayalam Film Awards for 4 consecutive years. A short career in Indian Cinema followed with Ash appearing in such films as Chintamani Kolacase and Sangaathi.

Ash made the move to the UAE in 2010 to work for Dubai One first as a reporter for youth program Twenty Something and then as a reporter and relief host for Studio One covering holidays for Tom and Saba.

== Former hosts ==
=== Saba Wahid (season 1) ===
Saba Wahid is an American television presenter and Chef with Pakistani ethnic origin. She was born and raised in Boston, Massachusetts and had a variety of influences in her life including higher education, Pakistani customs, Islamic traditions and strong family values.

Growing up, Saba developed many different hobbies and participated in a variety of extracurricular activities ranging from sports such as Alpine skiing, Biking, Running, Field Hockley, Ice Hockey and Lacrosse. But the hobby that Saba most connected with was cooking.

Saba studied in the United States obtaining a BA from the University of Massachusetts Amherst, and then continuing on to Hospitality Management at the French Culinary Institute in New York City. Working for a prestigious catering company in Manhattan and organizing events, she worked closely with some of the best chefs the city had to offer. She then found inspiration to begin catering private events by using her own creative cooking style and fused South Asian and Middle Eastern cuisine, but presented it in a more contemporary manner. Saba's strong ties to the culinary arts ultimately brought out her passion to be able to communicate this in the realm of television. After appearing in a number of locally produced cooking television programs, she made the move to Dubai where she took the next step in her career and presented Ask One and then Studio One. In 2011 celebrity magazine Ahlan! described her as Dubai's next celebrity chef. On 30 June 2011 Saba announced live on television that she would be leaving the program. She is now working on her cooking career and publishes her own blog titled Culinary Delights.

== Content ==
Studio One covered a wide range of subjects during its first season, including fashion, pregnancy, health, Art, education, live performances from singers, musicians and dancers including Capoeira, Balet, Tango, Tap, Bollywood, musicals and Flamenco and has regular live demonstrations which the presenters often try out for themselves; including makeup, hair makeovers, pottery, acting, flower arranging, motorbike riding, machete juggling, improv comedy, illusion and table setting.

From March 2011, Studio One began featuring a number of live reports presented by Aishwarya Ajit. Ash has reported live from the launch of Art Dubai at the Dubai International Financial Centre and the first International Street Theatre Festival at Dubai Marina Mall Promenade. When Ash took over as co-host Dina Butti replaced her as live reporter.

Studio One is also known for its coverage of charitable initiatives including Breast Cancer Arabia, Yasmoon and Gulf4Good and for featuring a number of celebrity guests.

=== Notable studio guests ===
- Tinsley Mortimer – Author and 'IT' Girl
- The Harlem Globetrotters
- Marco Pierre White – Renowned Chef
- Annabel Karmel – Celebrity Chef and TV Presenter
- Bobby Chinn – Celebrity Chef and TV Presenter
- Barry Norman CBE – British Film Critic, TV Presenter and author
- Dr. Andrew Ordon – Co-Host of the American program The Doctors
- Darren Day – British actor, musical star and television host
- Yvonne O'Grady – British actress
- Lisa Scott-Lee – Member of pop group Steps
- Carl Donnelly – Comedian
- Milo McCabe – Comedian and television Presenter
- Jason John Whitehead – Comedian
- Charlie Higson – Star of The Fast Show and author of the Young Bond novels.
- Craig Quinnell – Welsh Rugby Player
- Gavin Quinnell – Welsh Rugby Player
- Elton Chigumbura – Zimbabwe Cricket Captain
- Clarita de Quiroz – Singer and television presenter
- Graham Onions – England Cricketer
- Nitin Mirani – Indian Comedian
- Martin James – British Broadcaster, author and fly fisherman
- Colin Charvis – Former Welsh Rugby Union Captain
- Liam Plunkett – England Cricketer
- Ken Hom – Celebrity chef
- Ian Rankin – Author of the Inspector Rebus series
- Ben Okri – Booker Prize–winning poet
- Derek Khan – Stylist who created Ghetto Fabulous
- Ben De Lisi – Fashion designer
- Ben Miller – Comedian, Armstrong & Miller
- Jeffrey Deaver – Best-selling author
- John Connolly – Best-selling author
- Dannii Minogue – Singer and reality TV judge
- Nicholas Sparks – Bestselling author
- Dame Kelly Holmes – Double Olympic Gold-winning athlete
- Johnny Shentall – Member of pop group Hear'Say
- Alan Butcher – Zimbabwe Cricket Coach
- Tariq Ramadan – Author and academic
- Tony Parsons – Man and Boy author and journalist
- Melanie Blatt – Former member of The All Saints
- Sharon Corr – Member of The Corrs
- Jason Vale – Television presenter
- Willie Harcourt-Cooze – Modern-day Willie Wonka
- Wonho Chung – Korean comedian
- Faramarz Gharibian – Iranian film star
- Matt Kirshen – British comedian
- Amy Schumer – American comedian
- Ash King – Singer
- Layne Redman – British Television Presenter
- Tony Buzan – Author and inventor of Mind Mapping
- Giorgio Locatelli – Michelin Starred Celebrity Chef
- Antonio Carluccio – The Godfather of Italian Gastronomy
- Max Stevenson – French Illusionist
- Patrick Holford – Author and nutritionist

=== Notable interviewees ===
- Il Divo – Hit Man Band
- Michael Palin – Monty Python's Flying Circus star, author and television presenter
- Nobu Matsuhisa – Chef and founder of Nobu Restaurant
- Al Murray – British comedian
- Kim Kardashian – Celebrity socialite
- Paris Hilton – American socialite
- Carolina Herrera Jr – Daughter of Carolina Herrera
- Wasim Akram – Pakistani Cricketer
- Chris Jericho – WWE Wrestler
- Mark Billingham – Author
- Roger McGough – Poet
- Sir Terry Wogan – British Broadcaster
- Chris Tarrant OBE – Host of Who Wants to Be a Millionaire?
- Victoria Azarenka – World No 1 Female Tennis Player
- Samantha Stosur – 2011 Australian Open Winner
- Pierre Gagnaire – Chef
- Antony Worrall Thompson – Celebrity Chef
- Gary Rhodes – Michelin starred Celebrity Chef
- Miles Jupp – British actor, comedian and writer

== Cooking ==
Cooking is a daily feature on Studio One with many of Dubai's top award-winning Chefs appearing to prepare a dish for the presenters to sample at the end of the episode. All of the recipes are published on Studio One's Facebook page before each episode so that viewers can cook along at home.

=== Chefs ===
- Tom Egerton – Executive Sous Chef, Grosvenor House, Dubai
- Sameer Miglani – Executive Chef, Movenpick, Bur Dubai
- Paul Kennedy – Brand Chef, Mango Tree Middle East
- Paul de Visser – Executive Chef, Ruth's Chris Steak House, Monarch Hotel, Dubai
- Scott Price – Executive Chef, Table 9, Hilton, Dubai Creek
- Jean van der Westhuizen – Executive Chef, Loui's Restaurant & Cafe
- Samar Badri
- Suzanne Hussaini – Author When Suzanne Cooks
- John Sinjobi
- Ariana Bundy
- Aaron Maree
- Carol Holditch – Cookbook Author
- Hugh Sato Gardiner – Okku Restaurant, Monarch Hotel, Dubai
- Dinesh Kumar – TiffinBites, Dubai
- Olivier Biles – Head Chef of Reflets par Pierre Gagnaire, Dubai
- Andrew Paderes – Head Chef, Gramercy, DIFC
- Mauro Cereda – Executive Sous Chef, Media Rotana, Dubai
- Fadi Kolkosh – Cafe Arabesque, Park Hyatt, Dubai
- Mac – Thiptara, The Palace Hotel, Old Town, Dubai
- Stefan Borchardt
- Malika Van Reenen
- Paulo
- Ashley Goddard – The Meydan
- George – The Terrace, Le Meridien Hotel, Dubai
- Raymond – Le Meridien Hotel, Dubai
- Mike Tafe – The Market Cafe, The Grand Hyatt, Dubai
- Simon Conboy – Head Chef, The Ivy, Dubai
- Yael Mejia
- Colin Clague – Executive Chef, Caprice Holdings Middle East
- Peter Hallmans – Advisory Chef, Fonterra
- Enzo Neri – Formerly Executive Chef, Al Shalal Beach Club, Palm Jumeirah, Dubai
- Marta Yanci – Personal Chef
- Alessandro Botazzi – Ronda Locatelli Restaurant, Atlantis, The Palm, Dubai
- Gregory Khellouf – Executive Chef, Atelier De Chef, Le Meridien Hotel, Dubai
- Ahmad Kaskas – Head Chef, Just Falafel, Dubai
- Maher Naddaf – KSA Advisory Chef, Fonterra Middle East
- Angel Zappata – Atlantis, The Palm, Dubai
- Gary Lee – Senior Head Chef, The Ivy, London
- Wesley Berghoff – Seafire Steak House, Atlantis, The Palm, Dubai
- Edi Pancamala – West 14th, Oceana Beach Club, The Palm Jumeirah
- Jason Oakley – Margaux, Souk Al-Bahar, Dubai
- Laurent Brunacci – Shangri-La
- Laurent Pommey – Park Hayatt, Abu Dhabi
- Mehmet
- Etienne
- Chintana

=== Chef search ===
In 2011, Studio One began a competition to find Dubai's Best Amateur Cook. Chef Sameer Miglani of the Movenpick Hotel in Bur Dubai was the judge who put the competitors through their paces. In the end former lawyer Marta Yanci was the winner. She has since made several appearances on the program.

== Season two ==
Season two featured a number of new features built around greater interactivity and the new half-hour format.

== Filming ==
The program is broadcast live from Sunday to Thursday from Studio C at DMI's Maktoum studios in Dubai in the United Arab Emirates.

=== Set ===
The set designer is Abdul Rahman El Korek. The original set resembled an open-plan split level studio apartment consisting of a living area, kitchen and mezzanie level. The interviews were generally conducted in the living area where there were two comfortable sofas and a coffee table. The kitchen was fully functioning and included an oven and a hob. The mezzanie level was seldom used unless Tom wished to escape from a particularly female focussed interview.

The set was completely rebuilt for season 3.

=== Producers ===
Studio One was created and produced by Ray Addison and Faraz Javed.

== Recognition ==
In 2011 Tom and Saba were recognised alongside Rosemin Manji as media trendsetters and listed in the Ahlan! Hot 100. They were also nominated and shortlisted as the Best Male and Female Presenters in Abu Dhabi at the Best in Abu Dhabi Awards 2011. Studio One was also nominated as the Best Television Programme at the Best in Abu Dhabi Awards 2011. Additionally Saba was given her own food column in Ahlan! magazine. In October 2011 Studio One was nominated as the Best Television Programme at the Best in Dubai Awards. The eventual winner was fellow Dubai One television program Out & About.
