= Enzo Neri =

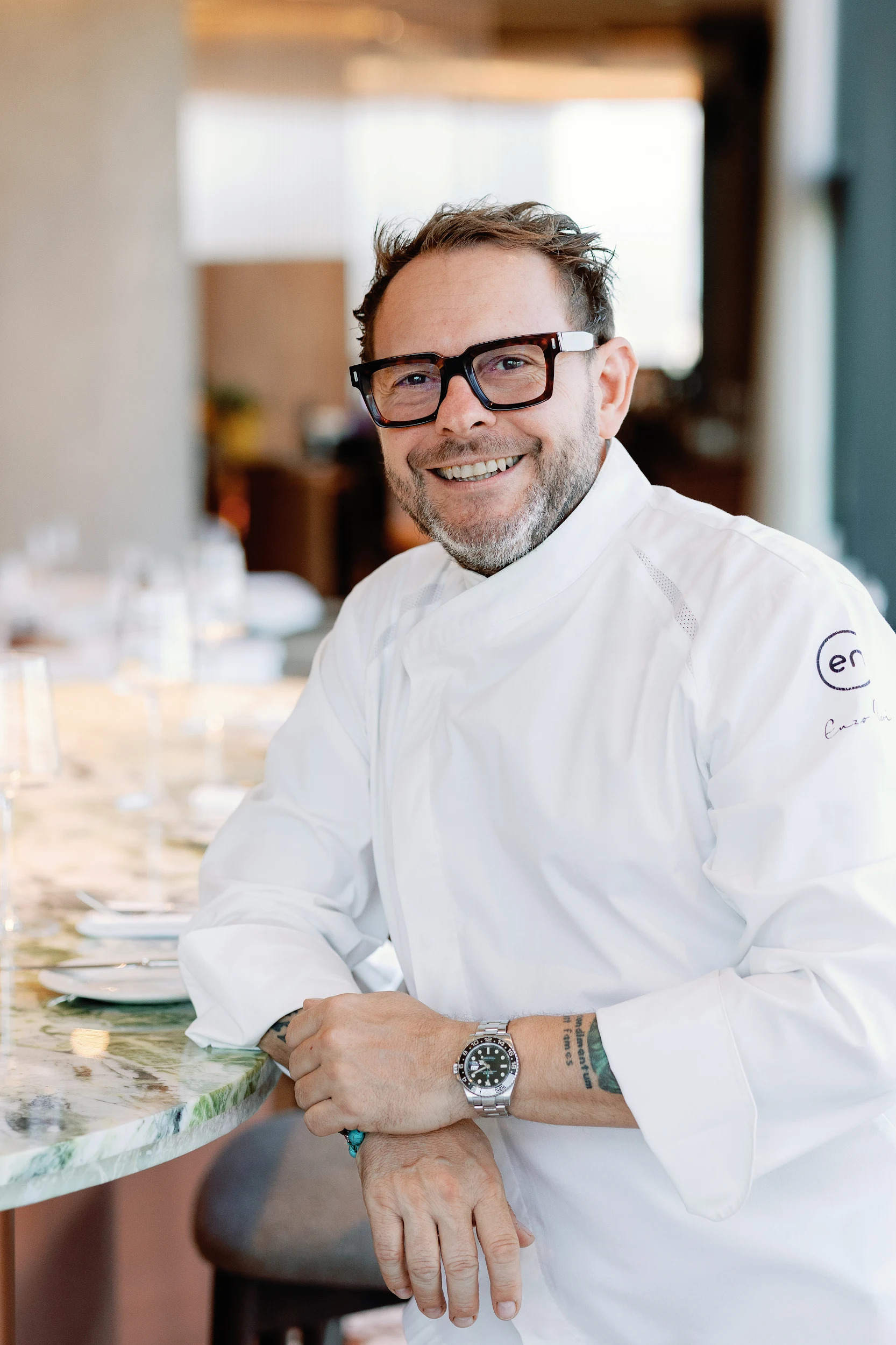
- Born: October 8, 1971 (age 54); Citta di Castello, Umbria, Italy
- Education: Bufalini School; Università dei Sapori
- Occupations: chef, restaurateur, designer
- Website: enzoneri.com/en

Enzo Neri (born 1971; Umbria, Italy) is an Italian brand chef, restaurateur, philanthropist and designer based in Tbilisi, Georgia.

== Early years ==
Neri was born in 1971 in Città di Castello in the Province of Perugia and received his degree in computer science. Neri joined Gildo restaurant to work in the kitchen, where he spent the summer learning to cook. He later joined Bufalini School in Città di Castello to enroll in a cooking class.

By the age of 29, he joined Università dei Sapori (The University of Flavors) in Perugia to study gastronomy. Neri's culinary career began when he joined the 1 Michelin starred restaurant, Il Postale in his hometown, under the guidance of his mentor, chef Marco Bistarelli.

== Career ==
Neri found a job in London in 2003 through a phone call from Vasco Matteucci, a fellow citizen from San Giustino, who had opened his restaurant Vasco & Piero Pavilion in Poland Street in 1971.

In 2005, Neri served as head chef at the Kings Arms Hotel, where he gained one AA Rosette award. He then moved to Washington D.C to work at Maestro restaurant at the Ritz Carlton Washington D.C.

In 2009, Neri moved to Dubai where he worked as the Head Chef at Rococo, an Italian restaurant in the Sofitel Hotel Jumeirah Beach, and in 2011, he left Rococo to become the executive chef of Al Shalal Beach Club, Palm Jumeirah to reopen it as Riva Beach Club.

Later in 2011, Neri moved to New York and began managing Broken English, an Italian restaurant in Brooklyn, where he also served as a partner. Neri became the Executive chef for the Obicà group restaurant based in the Flatiron District, Manhattan in 2014. He developed the menu concept for Obicà and his work has been reviewed in notable publications such as the New York Times and New York Daily News. Neri was invited to visit Georgia for the first time in 2015 to hold an event promoting tourism. This visit led him to decide to relocate permanently to Georgia in 2017. The event was held in Chateau Mere, a stone castle hotel in Kakheti. From 2015 to 2017, Neri worked as Executive Chef at Gradisca restaurant in the West Village in New York City.

In 2017, while in New York, Neri transformed traditional Khinkali into a chocolate dessert with ricotta cheese filling, called Chocolate Khinkali making him more popular for his tribute to Georgian cuisine. In November 2017, Neri co-founded the Mediterranean restaurant La Boheme in Tbilisi, which gained a high rate with Gault Millau restaurant guide. In 2020, Neri started to work as the brand chef for Maqro Group developing a new restaurant concept at the Mercure Hotel Tbilisi Old Town, ASADO Steakhouse. In 2021, he co-founded Vera Italiana with Niccolo Ricciardi, an Italian restaurant in the Vera district of Tbilisi, offering Italian finger foods, antipasti, pizza, salads, pasta, and desserts. In the same year, Neri published his book, Asado Steakhouse Cookbook. The book presents recipes based on the idea of an Argentine steakhouse and some dishes from Neri's culinary career.

In 2024, Neri developed Olives restaurant as a brand chef for Maqro Group at the newly opened Swissôtel Tbilisi. In the summer of the same year, McDonald's Georgia collaborated with Neri to develop a burger sandwich called Pomorello, a mash-up of tomato and fried mozzarella with a pizzaiola sauce to be combined clearly with the classic veal or chicken burger.

Neri has worked as a chef consultant for several restaurants, including Sheer in Caribbean, Cicchetteria in Cyprus, Via della Pace in New York City, Pomodorissimo, Andropov’s Ears and Filini for the Radisson Hotels group Tbilisi, and as the brand chef for DineHall and RumRoof at the Ibis Styles Tbilisi Center by Maqro Group.

== In media ==
Neri has appeared on several TV shows, including Food Network's Chopped (season 30, 2016), as a guest chef on Studio One, broadcast on Dubai One, and as a guest on Business Media Georgia, and Imedi TV in 2018.
