= Kris Fade =

Australian-Lebanese radio presenter (born 1980)

- Born: Kristan Fahd; 27 February 1980 (age 46); Sydney, Australia
- Occupations: Radio presenter, Reality TV Star, Host, Musician
- Family: Matty Fahd (contestant on Gogglebox Australia)

Kristan Fahd (born 27 February 1982), known professionally as Kris Fade, is a Dubai-based Australian-Lebanese radio presenter, host, and musician.

He is the star of his own breakfast radio show called "The Kris Fade Show" which airs on 104.4 Virgin Radio Dubai and the KIIS Network in Australia. Fade is also a cast member on the reality television show, Dubai Bling (2022), the first such show based out of Dubai.

== Career ==
Fade worked at a radio station in Sydney, Australia, at the age of 25, where he was introduced to Ian Grace, the CEO of Virgin Radio. He offered to transfer Fade to either Kuala Lumpur or Dubai, with Fade picking the latter in order to connect with his Arabic roots. He later became host of "The Kris Fade show".

Fade has won awards for 'Best Radio DJ', 'Best Personality' and is on the Ahlan! list for the 'Hot 100 Legends.' Fade has performed at various concerts and events including Dubai Music Week and RedfestDXB. Fade appeared on reality show Dubai Bling. He did not return for Season 3.

In 2024, he won the "Reality Personality of the Year" for his work on Dubai Bling at the National Reality TV Awards.

In 2024, Kris Fade shared how a personal health concern inspired him to create his wellness brand, Fade Fit, aiming to offer healthier snack alternatives for children. The story reflects his transition from a media figure to an entrepreneur in Dubai’s growing startup ecosystem.

== Personal life ==
Fade's parents George and Gilda Fahd are both from Lebanon.

In 2018, Fade divorced his ex-wife Marriane Argy, with whom he has two children. Fade married his wife Brianna Ramirez Fade in March 2022. They had a public wedding that was shown on the Netflix reality show, Dubai Bling. Fade has two daughters with his ex-wife and a son with Brianna.

His brother, Matty Fahd, is featured on the Australian version of the British observational reality show Gogglebox, which airs on Foxtel and Network 10.
