= Mohammed Alkobaisi =

21st-century Iraqi Islamic scholar

Dr Mohammed Al-Kobaisi
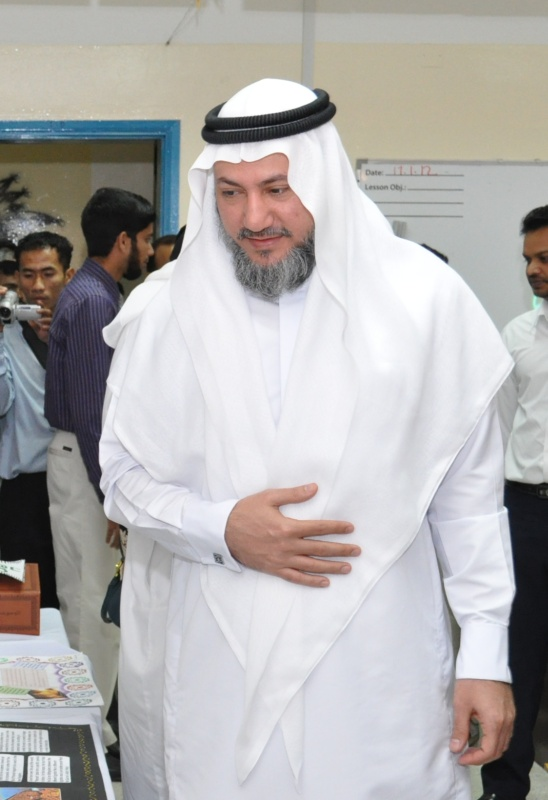
- Mohammed Alkobaisi

Personal life
- Born: 13 November 1970 Iraq
- Era: Modern Era
- Region: Middle East
- Main interest(s): Tafsir, Hadith Fiqh, Sharia
- Education: Baghdad University

Religious life
- Religion: Islam
- Denomination: Sunni

Muslim leader
- Awards: Award of Dubai Government Excellence Program as an Innovative Employee in the year 2008.; Honored in 2009 by Sheikh Mohammed bin Rashid Al Maktoum the Prime Minister and Vice President of the United Arab Emirates (UAE), Ruler of Dubai.; Award of "Distinguished Researcher" in 2007.; Award of "Distinguished Mufti" in 2008, 2011.

Mohammed Eyadah Alkobaisi (Arabic: ; الدكتور محمد بن عيادة الكبيسي; also محمد عيادة الكبيسي; محمد الكبيسي) is an Islamic scholar with PhD in specialized Islamic studies.

== Academic Study ==
He holds a PhD from Baghdad University, 2002, in specialized Islamic studies. The thesis was titled: 'The Lost Part of Tafseer Ibn Abi Hatim Ar-Razi'. He holds 'Ejazaah' scholarly degree, in the six books of hadith, with continuous-chain to the blessed Prophet Mohammed (Peace and Blessings of God be upon him). He holds many 'Ejaazah' scholarly degrees, from different scholars in different linguistic and Islamic Sciences.

== Work ==
Alkobaisi is a Grand Mufti at Islamic Affairs and Charitable Activities Department in Dubai.

== Activities ==
Alkobaisi is a public figure and a TV personality, and he is the writer and presenter of Understanding Islam TV Show, a weekly educational program about Islam and its different aspects that shape and affect the life of Muslims. The show targets English speaking Muslims, new Muslims and people interested in knowing more about the religion of Islam. Understanding Islam TV Show concentrates on the practical application of the Islamic guidance, and its importance in the real daily life of people.

== Achievements ==
=== Academic publications ===
Recently, many academic works of Alkobaisi have been printed, including:

- Sawm Al-Qoloob, (Arabic: ; صوم القلوب).
- Selected Fatwas on AL-HAJJ, (Arabic: ; فتاوى مختارة حول الحج).
- Selected Fatwas on AL-Taharah, (Arabic: ; فتاوى مختارة حول الطهارة).
- Selected Fatwas on AL-Salah, (Arabic: ; فتاوى مختارة حول الصلاة).
- Selected Fatwas on AL-Salah 2, (Arabic: ; فتاوى مختارة حول الصلاة 2).
- Selected Fatwas on AL-Salah 3, (Arabic: ; فتاوى مختارة حول الصلاة 3).
- Tafseer Sorat Al-Qasas, an objective interpretation, (Arabic: ; تفسير سورة القصص تفسيرا موضوعيا).
- Tafseer Sorat Aal-Imraan, an objective interpretation, (Arabic: ; تفسير سورة آل عمران تفسيرا موضوعيا).
- Selected Fatwas on AL-Uthhiya 1, (Arabic: ; فتاوى مختارة حول الأضحية).
- Selected Fatwas on AL-Uthhiya 2, (Arabic: ;2 فتاوى مختارة حول الأضحية).
- Selected Fatwas on Zakat Al Fitr 1, (Arabic: ; فتاوى مختارة حول زكاة الفطر).
- Selected Fatwas on Zakat Al Fitr 2, (Arabic: ; فتاوى مختارة حول زكاة الفطر 2).
- Many peer reviewed research papers.

=== TV Programs ===
- Adh-Dharibon fi Al-Ard, Arabic, 194 episodes, Dubai Business Channel.
- Shari'ah and Real-estate, English, 8 episodes, Al-Aqaria Channel.
- Fa Innaho Yarak, Arabic, 20 episodes, Al-Aqaria Channel.
- Nafahat Ramadaniya 1, Arabic, 30 episodes.
- Nafahat Ramadaniya 2, Arabic, 30 episodes.
- Understanding Islam 1, English, 18 episodes, Dubai One TV.
- Understanding Islam 2, English, 39 episodes, Dubai One TV.
- Understanding Islam 3, English, 36 episodes, Dubai One TV.
- Understanding Islam 4, English, ongoing, Dubai One TV.
- Understanding Islam Ramadan 1, English, 29 episodes, Dubai One TV.
- Understanding Islam Ramadan 2, English, 30 episodes, Dubai One TV.
- Understanding Islam Ramadan 3, English, 30 episodes, Dubai One TV.

== Awards ==
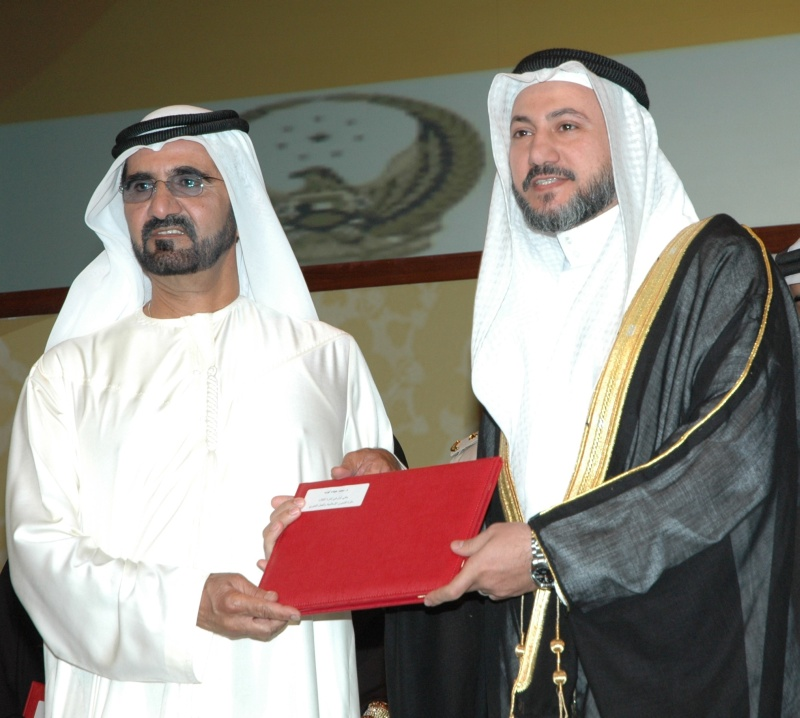
Dr Alkobaisi honored by Sheikh Mohammed bin Rashid Al Maktoum, Prime Minister & Vice President of United Arab Emirates (UAE), Ruler of Dubai.

- Award of distinction in the Research House for Islamic Studies and Heritage Revival, Government of Dubai, in 2006.
- First place award as the "Distinguished Researcher" in the Islamic Affairs and Charitable Activities Department IACAD's Excellence Award in 2007.
- First place award as the "Distinguished Mufti" in the Islamic Affairs and Charitable Activities Department IACAD's Excellence Award in 2008.
- Winner of the prestigious award of Dubai Government Excellence Program as an Innovative Employee in Dubai Government in the year 2008, and he was honored in 2009 by Sheikh Mohammed bin Rashid Al Maktoum the Prime Minister and Vice President of the United Arab Emirates (UAE), Ruler of Dubai. Dubai Government Excellence Program Award recognizes and rewards exceptional government employees and departments.
- First place award as the "Distinguished Mufti" in the Islamic Affairs and Charitable Activities Department IACAD's Excellence Award in 2011.
