= DJ Bliss =

Emirati DJ and radio and TV presenter (born 1981)

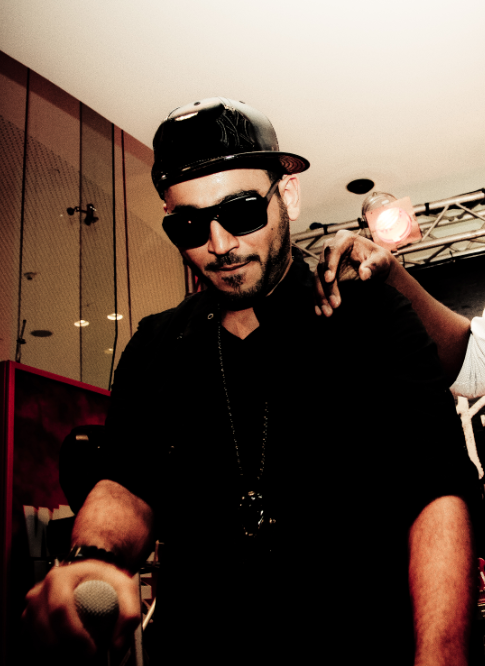
- DJ Bliss
- Born: Marwan Parham Al Awadhi; 6 June 1981 (age 45); Dubai, United Arab Emirates
- Occupations: Disc Jockey; Emcee; TV Presenter; Radio Jockey
- Years active: 2006- Present
- Organization: Bliss Inc. Entertainment
- Known for: Cast of Dubai Bling Television host on Dubai One; Radio Jockey on Channel 4 FM/Radio 1 (resigned); DJ at 411 Nights; Selekt Talent Agency Owner of Beats and Cuts Celebrity Barber Shop and Karak Inc cafe
- Website: http://www.djbliss.com/

Marwan Parham Al Awadhi (born 6 June 1981), better known by his stage name DJ Bliss, is an Emirati disc jockey, emcee, TV presenter, and radio personality working in with no one. In addition to being actively involved in the nightclub and DJ scene in Dubai, he is known for his music production including co-producing Wyclef Jean and releasing his own single and compilation album The Projects. The album was released on BMGI Middle East and was top 10 on the Middle East album chart of Virgin.

He is also credited as one of the first Emirati citizen DJs to go on a world tour. He previously hosted the television show That's Entertainment on Dubai One as well as the radio show The Real Flava on Channel 4 in Dubai.

== Biography ==
DJ Bliss started his music career In the late 1990s, initially working small DJ jobs at a theme park, then as a guest DJ spot on a Dubai radio station. Just a couple of years later, he won the Middle East Regional 'Palm DJ of the year award'.

By the late 2000s, DJ Bliss had started promoting his own parties, booking artists and DJs such as DJ Jazzy Jeff, Mos Def, DJ Drama, DJ Whoo Kid, and many more.

After signing to Universal Music MENA, DJ Bliss released a hit single "Shining" ft. international rapper Mims and Daffy.

== Career ==
DJ Bliss was born and raised in Dubai and began his career while still in high school. His brother taught him how to play both the guitar and drums which is what he attributes for his love of music. DJ Bliss had a radio show while still in school and at the beginning of college. He was also in a band named KRAK (later changed to Cyanide) and also began to DJ at the same time, playing at parties of his friends. DJ Bliss used to appear on Radio One as a guest DJ on Teenzpoint.com and Crazyspin.com.

DJ Bliss is known as one of the top DJs in the Emirates. In 2005, he won the top prize at a Middle East DJ competition. This gave him the opportunity to DJ at Ministry of Sound, a renowned nightclub in London. He has also spun at private parties for musicians such as Kanye West and Akon. He performs in clubs such as People by Crystal where he hosts his 411 Nights. He has also toured internationally playing at venues in Mauritius, Paris, Barcelona, Hong Kong, and Malaysia.

DJ Bliss previously hosted the show That's Entertainment. As part of his work on the show, he interviewed celebrities such as James Blunt, Nicki Minaj, and Paris Hilton.

In late 2011, DJ Bliss released his first single entitled "Everything About You". He followed up in 2012 with the release of his first music video entitled "Let It Go". The video featured Canadian rapper Kardinal Offishall who also performed lyrics in the song. DJ Bliss and Offishall originally met in 2009 when Offishall was on tour with Akon. In late 2012, it was announced that DJ Bliss would be on the international judges panel for the 1st annual Dubai International Music Awards in November 2013 along with Hype Williams, SoFly and Nius, Woo Rhee, and Mokobé.

DJ Bliss has been referred to as the "Middle East's representative of Beats" by Dr. Dre. In 2013, he flew to Miami to be featured in a Wyclef Jean song entitled "Mid Life Crisis", which was produced by DJ Bliss and Prince Q. Bliss was signed to Universal Music MENA and the first DJ in the MENA region to be signed to booking agency SKAM Artist in the US in 2015. DJ Bliss is also the founder of Bliss Inc Entertainment, an events and promotion company which includes Beats and Cuts Barber Shop based out of Dubai.

Since 2022, DJ Bliss has been a main cast member on the Netflix reality television show Dubai Bling.

== Awards ==
- 2012, Nightlife Award 'Best Urban Night', Time Out Dubai
- 2012, HOT 100 'Trendsetter', Ahlan!
- 2011, World's Top DJs 'Best Local DJ', Time Out Dubai
- 2011, The Hot 40, Gulf News
- 2011, Hot Bachelor, Cosmopolitan Magazine Middle East
- 2010, Hot 100 Up & Coming, Ahlan!
- 2009 and 2008, Bachelor of the Year, VIVA Magazine
- 2009, Hot 100 'Up & Coming', Ahlan!
