= Ariana Bundy =

Iranian–American chef, writer and television personality

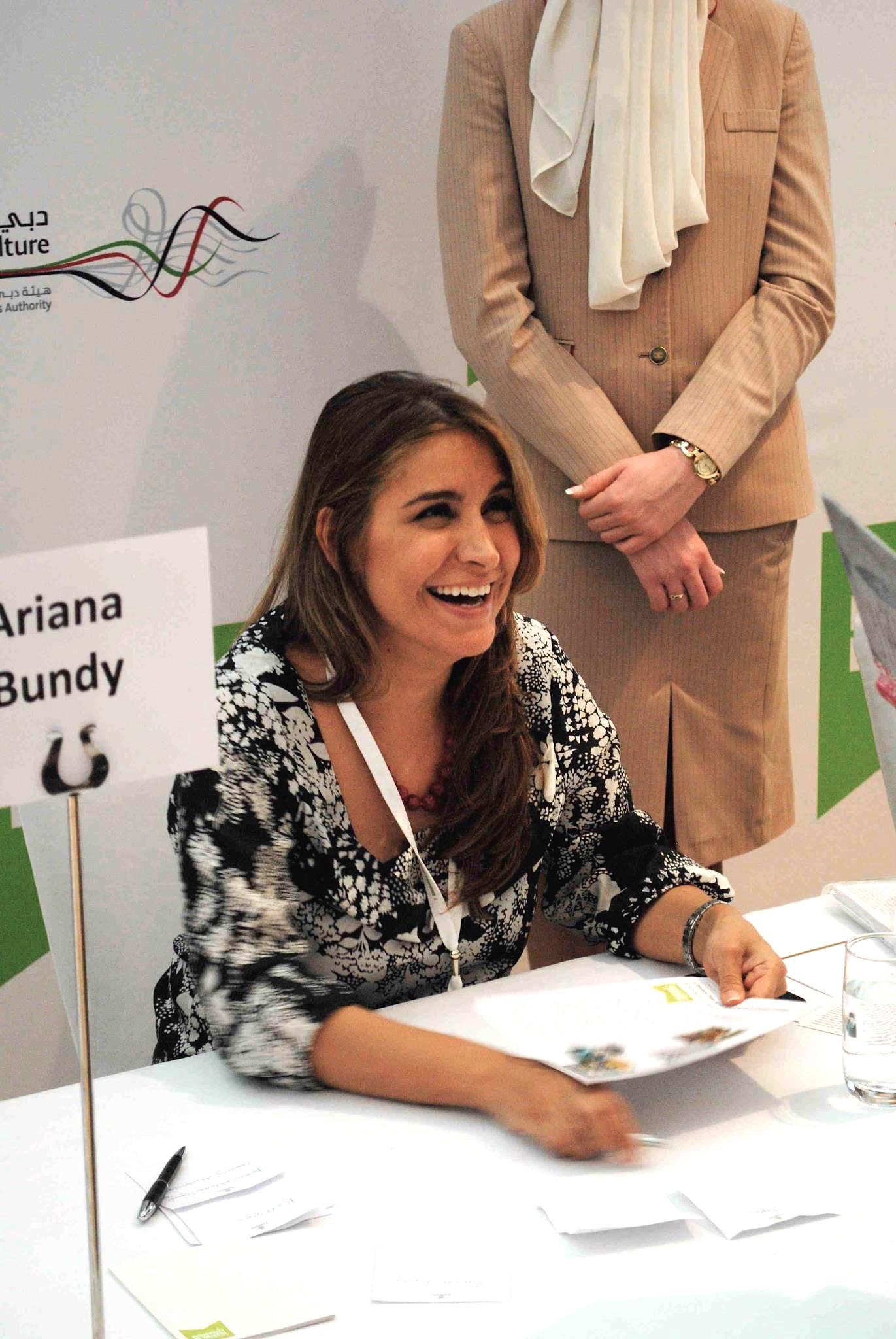
- Born: Iran
- Education: European Business School London; Le Cordon Bleu
- Occupation: Chef
- Culinary career
- Cooking style: Persian/Middle Eastern
- Television show: Ariana's Persian Kitchen
- Website: Ariana Bundy Website

Ariana Bundy is an Iranian–American chef, writer, and television personality. She is best known for her cookery and travel series Ariana's Persian Kitchen which airs on Nat Geo People. She is an author of two books and has been featured in notable publications and television programs for her culinary work. Bundy is known for her Persian/Middle Eastern cooking style.

== Early life and education ==
Bundy was born in Iran in 1974, leaving the country with her family during the Iranian Revolution in 1979. She attended boarding school in Switzerland when she was five years old, and lived in New York City, Paris, London and Rome during her childhood. Her biological father originally lived in France, later running Chez Michel, the first French fine dining restaurant in Iran and Club 22, a French-Californian restaurant in Beverly Hills. In addition to her father, her love of cooking comes from her landowner grandparents who grew fruits vegetables and raised animals on a commercial scale.

Bundy attended the European Business School London where she studied international business and marketing. She began working at her mother's haute couture fashion house. While working with her mother, Bundy's uncle offered to pay for her to attend any cookery school in the world. She was accepted into and attended Le Cordon Bleu and Le Notre in Paris, training at Fauchon Patisserie.

== Career ==
After graduating with her Le Grand Diplôme in patisserie and later cuisine, she became the head pastry chef for the Mondrian Hotel in Los Angeles. While at the Mondrian, she catered to parties for the Oscars and Golden Globes as well as events for Vanity Fair. She also consulted on various events and catered lunches for Sex and the City and Eyes Wide Shut. Clients she has cooked for include celebrities Tom Hanks, Nicole Kidman, Bill Clinton, Brad Pitt, and Madonna. Bundy worked for the Mondrian for two years and left in 2002.

Shortly after leaving the Mondrian, Bundy published her first of two books. Titled Sweet Alternative, it was a cookbook featuring desserts using alternatives to dairy, gluten, or soy. The book was inspired by her own food intolerances. In 2012 she published Pomegranates and Roses: My Persian Family Recipes, a part cookbook and part memoir. It received a Gourmand Cookbook Award in 2012 and also shortlisted as the best cookery book at the 2013 Writer's Guild Awards. The book was praised by food writers such as Madhur Jaffrey and Jocelyn Dimbelby. She also made the Hot 100 list of Ahlan! Magazine in 2013 and also featured in Hello! magazine.

In 2015, Bundy became the host of the cookery and travel series Ariana's Persian Kitchen. The show launched on Nat Geo People and broadcast in Asia, the Middle East, and Africa as well as on Fox Life India. The show was filmed over the course of two years and explores her native culture of Iran.

For her work in culinary arts, Bundy has appeared on television networks that include BBC's Good Food Live, Channel 4's Sunday Brunch, Sky's Taste, Euronews, Fox and Top Billing – as well as publications such as The Irish Times, BBC Good Food, Food & Travel UK, Conde Nast's House & Garden, Harper's Bazaar, Good Housekeeping, Food & Wine Magazine, The Irish Examiner, House & Home UK, Financial Times and the Sunday Telegraph.

=== Published works ===
- Sweet Alternative: More than 100 recipes without gluten, dairy and soy (2005, Conran Octopus ISBN 1-84091-449-1)
- Pomegranates and Roses: My Persian Family Recipes (2012, Simon & Schuster ISBN 978-0-85720-690-9)

== Personal life ==
Ariana lives between San Francisco and Dubai with her husband Paul and son Dara.
