= Dareen Abughaida =

Palestinian broadcast journalist

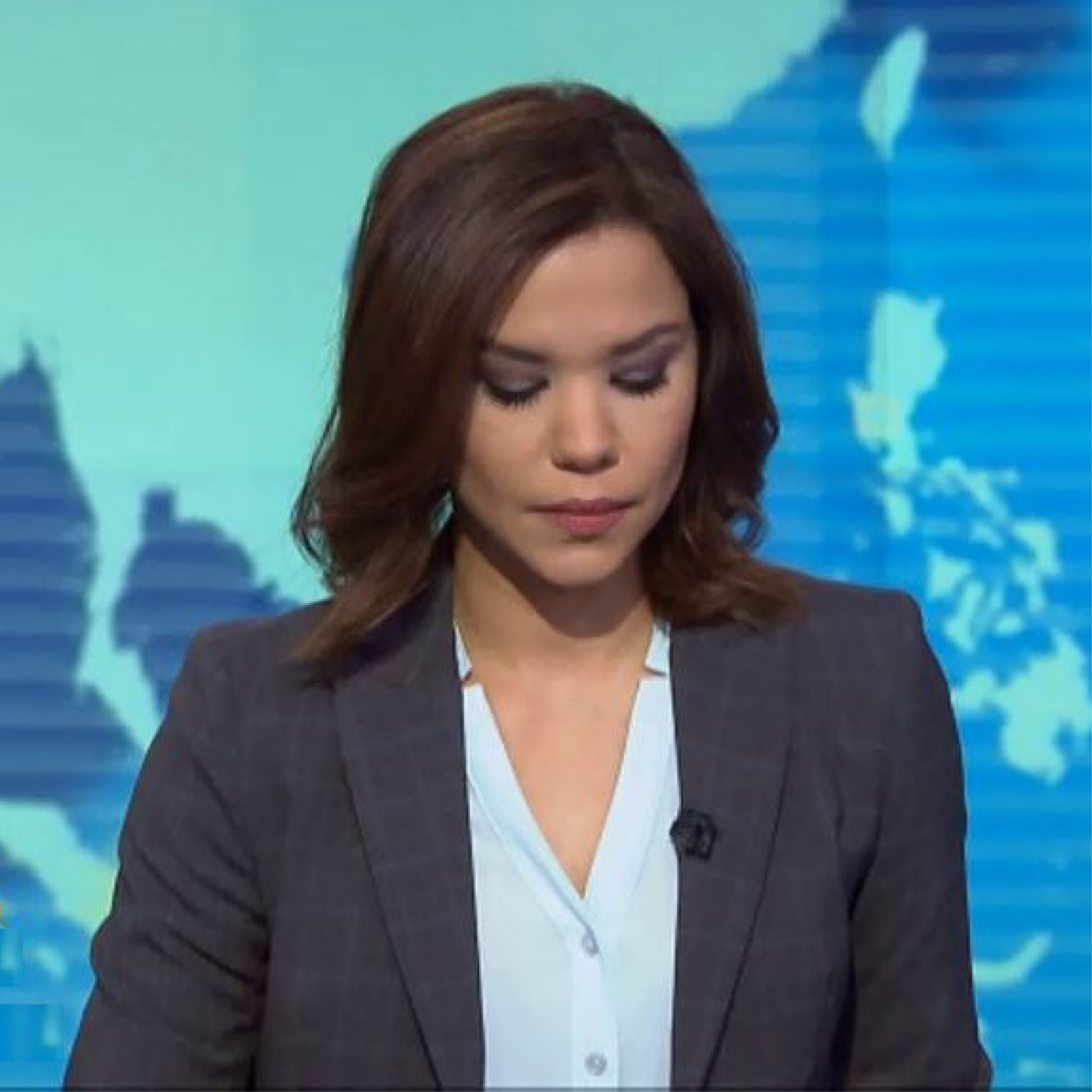
- Born: Dareen Abughaida; Doha, Qatar
- Education: Concordia University (BCom)
- Occupations: News anchor Moderator; Journalist

Dareen Abughaida (Arabic: دارين ابوغيدا born Dareen Abu Ghaida is a Palestinian-Lebanese broadcast journalist based in Doha, Qatar. She’s currently working as the principal news presenter, host and moderator for Al Jazeera English. Dareen previously worked for Bloomberg L.P., CNBC, World Bank, and Qatar Airways, as well as with the United Nations at summits.

== Career ==
Abughaida joined Al Jazeera English in Doha as a news anchor and later anchoring the flagship Newshour. At the station, she has reported on some of the international stories such as the Arab Spring (2010s), Egyptian Revolution (2011), Pope Benedict resignation (2013), Brexit (2016) and the ongoing Palestinian-Israel conflict.

Previously, she worked for Dubai One in the United Arab Emirates and, before that, for Bloomberg and CNBC.

== Personal life ==
Abughaida graduated from Concordia University in Quebec, with a Bachelor of Commerce degree.
