= Understanding Islam (TV program) =

2011 Emirati TV program

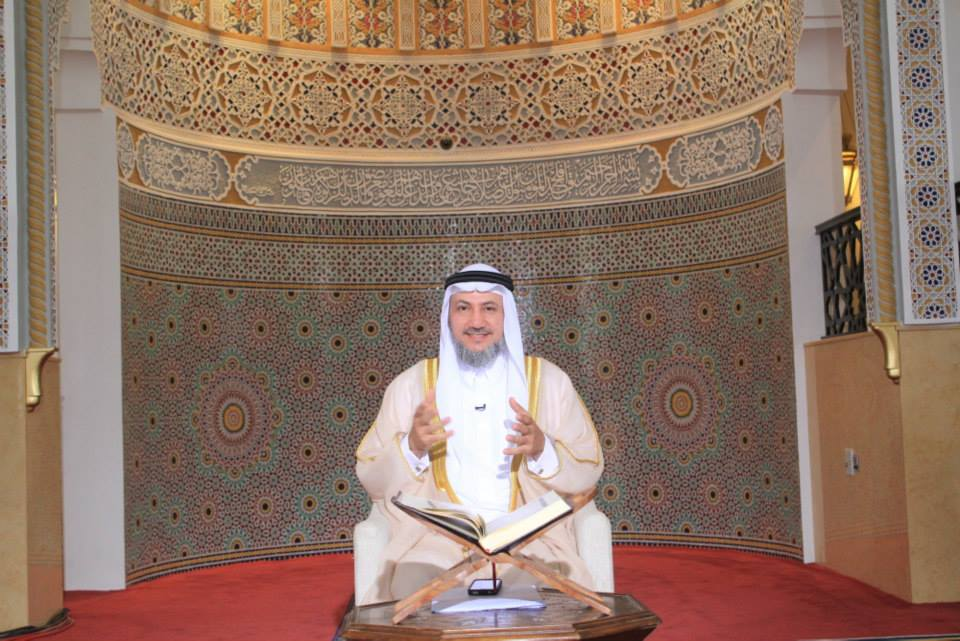
- Dr. Alkobaisi on the set of Understanding Islam Ramadan
- Directed by: David Coyle (S 1); Nashwa Hamad (S 2); Ehab Noor (S 3)
- Presented by: Dr. Mohammed Alkobaisi
- Country of origin: United Arab Emirates
- No. of seasons: Original: 4 seasons Ramadan: 3 seasons
- No. of episodes: 180

Production
- Producers: Omar Bin Butti (S 1); Shireen Yousef (S 2); Shireen Yousef (S 3)
- Running time: 20 mins (Main Season); 12 mins (Ramadan Season)
- Production companies: Dubai Media Incorporated; Dubai One

Original release
- Network: Dubai One
- Release: 2011 – present

Understanding Islam is a United Arab Emirates weekly educational television program that broadcasts on Dubai One TV, a channel of Dubai Media Incorporated, and the broadcast covers the Middle East, Europe and Africa, on nilesat 101, Arabsat BADR-4, AsiaSat 5 and Yahsat in HD. It has aired since 2011.

Each Friday, the show highlights some of the tenets of Islam, and it aims at explaining the foundations of the Muslims faith by exploring it from different angles, from the simplest fundamentals to the most complex questions of how faith applies to everyday lives.

Understanding Islam is prepared and presented by Dr. Mohammed Alkobaisi, a grand Mufti at the Islamic Affairs and Charitable Activities Department in Dubai.

== History ==
Understanding Islam started broadcasting as a weekly program on 21 November 2011. In the first season, 18 episodes were aired covering a wide array of topics, mostly focusing on the basics or Islam and human relationships. The second season started earlier and lasted longer, with 39 episodes aired. Likewise, the third season delivered 37 episode in total.

== Seasons ==
So far, Understanding Islam Show completed three main seasons, and three Ramadan seasons.

=== Season One ===
Season one delivered 18 episodes, three of which were dedicated to answering questions received from viewers. Some of the topics discussed in the first season were: Morals and Ethics, Parent Child relationships, Rights of the Child, Mercy for the World, Family and Marriage, Charity, Neighbors, Seeking Knowledge, Rights of People With Special Needs, Peaceful Coexistence and The Rights of Orphans.

=== Season Two ===
Season two delivered 39 episodes, with one live episode during the Dubai world peace conference, and few episodes dedicated to answering questions received from viewers.

Some of the topics discussed in season two were: Pillars of Emaan (Faith), HAJJ and the Ten Days of Thul-Hijjah, The Day of Arafa and Eid, The Pillars of Islam, Love of Homeland, Importance of Unity, The First Hijrah [immigration], The Hijrah of the Messenger, Jesus in Islam, The Main Objectives and Purposes of Islamic Rules and Regulations, The Five Necessities, Your Body Has Rights Over You, The Birth of our Prophet Mohammed, The Life of our Prophet Mohammed, The Messenger Mohammed in Madinah. Patience and Self-Control, The Relationship Between The Creator and the Creation, Hope for The Mercy of Allah, The Importance of Optimism, Road Safety, Dubai International Peace Convention (Live), Will the World End in 2012? and Al-Israa and Al-Miraaj.

=== Season Three ===
Season Three delivered 36 episodes, with one live episode covering the Day of Arafah during the Hajj season, and special episodes dedicated to answering questions received from viewers. This season saw an increase in viewers questions, such as: transliteration of the Quran, the nature of Mohammed, dreaming of Mohammed after his death, traveling to another country that started fasting at a different day, gossip in Islam, getting a physical massage by a person from the opposite gender, small amount of alcohol found in soft drinks, Etc.

Some of the topics discussed in season two were as follows: The Gradual Message to Humanity, The Hajj Season and The day of Eid, Returning From Hajj, Cleanliness, Lessons From the Hijrah, Human Rights in Islam, The Journey of Faith - Day of Arafah (Live), Cross-culture understanding, Happiness in life, Sunnah of Prophet Mohammed, Women in Islam, Meditation in Islam, Learn and seek knowledge and Environment in Islam.

=== Season Four ===
Season Four started airing on 13 September 2013.

Some of the topics of the fourth season were as follows: New Academic Year - Urge to Learn and Educate, Sources of Islamic Values, Importance of Thikr, Elderly People - special episode.

== Ramadan Seasons ==
So far, Understanding Islam Ramadan completed three seasons.

=== Ramadan Season One ===
The first season of Understanding Islam Ramadan delivered 29 episodes, some of them were dedicated to answering questions received from viewers.

Some of the topics discussed in the first Ramadan season were as follows: The Beginning of Ramadan, [Fasting] Sawm and its Rules and Regulations, Terms and Worships of the Holy Month, Rewards for Fasting, The Month of Extra Work, How To Avail Ramadan, Fasting of the Heart and Soul, Ramadan and the Holy Quran, Morals While Fasting, Charity in Ramadan, The Feeling of Ramadan, Ramadan and Children, Losing Fast and Rewards, Taraweeh and Qiyam, The Month of Patience, Generosity, The Last Ten Days, Laylat Al-Qadr, Etikaaf, Worshipers of Ramadan, Goodbye Ramadan, Zakaat Al-Fitr And Eid Al-Fitr Festival.

=== Ramadan Season Two ===
The second season of Understanding Islam Ramadan delivered 30 episodes, some of them were dedicated to answering questions received from viewers.

=== Ramadan Season Three ===
The third season of Understanding Islam Ramadan delivered 30 episodes, some of them were dedicated to answering questions received from viewers.

== Awards ==
In 2011, Understanding Islam won in five categories of the PromaxBDA Arabia Awards: - Gold Award for "Best Script", - Gold Award in the "ME, MYSELF & I" category, - Gold Award in the "BEST USE OF ENGLISH TYPOGRAPHY". - Silver Award in the "Habibi" category, - Silver Award in the "BEST PROMO NOT USING PROGRAMME FOOTAGE".

In 2012, Understanding Islam was finalist in five categories in the PromaxBDA Arabia Awards, and it secured three gold awards, one silver award, and one third place; - Gold Award for "Best Script", - Gold Award in the "Habibi" category, - Gold Award in the "ME, MYSELF & I" category, - Silver Award in the "BEST USE OF ENGLISH TYPOGRAPHY".

In 2012, Understanding Islam was nominated in two categories in the PromaxBDA Global Excellence award.

== See also ==
- List of Islamic films
