= That's Entertainment (Emirati TV program) =

- Directed by: Rima Yahfouf, Faraz Javed, Beverlee Asuncion
- Presented by: Marwan DJ Bliss; Dina Butti
- Country of origin: UAE
- No. of seasons: 3

Production
- Producer: Faraz Javed
- Running time: 30 minutes
- Production companies: Dubai Media Incorporated; Dubai One

Original release
- Network: Dubai One
- Release: September 2011

That's Entertainment is an Emirati weekly celebrity gossip television program broadcast on Dubai One in the GCC, MENA (including the Levant), Sub-Saharan Africa and parts of western Europe and North America. The program was launched on Dubai One in September 2011. It broadcasts every weekend on both Friday and Saturday.

That's Entertainment shows interviews Hollywood, Bollywood media stars, as well as going behind the scenes of locally filmed productions such as Mission: Impossible – Ghost Protocol and travelling to cover international events including The Oscars. Season One was hosted by Marwan DJ Bliss with Out & About's Punam Verma reporting for the program. In season two, Dina Butti took over reporting responsibilities part-time, eventually becoming a full-time co-presenter and writer in January 2013, while Marwan remained the main host.

== Content ==
That's Entertainment regularly acquires content from the United States, including coverage of Hollywood movie premieres taking place around the world, interviews with the stars on the red carpet, behind the scenes footage of various shoots and in depth coverage of all the major awards ceremonies. The program often opens with a new music video and closes with a new movie premiere.

Although interviews have been conducted with A-list actors such as Tom Cruise, Gwyneth Paltrow, John Travolta and Gerard Butler and TV stars like Kim Kardashian, Selena Gomez and Paris Hilton, the program primarily focuses on musical artists who are in the UAE to perform a concert. That's Entertainment has featured exclusive interviews with bands including Metallica, Jennifer Lopez, The Jacksons, Guns N' Roses, Daughtry, Incubus, The Script and Il Divo. Rappers and R n B Stars have consisted of Usher, 50 Cent, Neyo, Nicki Minaj and Jason Derulo. Other solo artists interviewed are Enrique Iglesias, Craig David and Tiesto.

That's Entertainment also places emphasis on Bollywood news, which has a large presence and following in the UAE. Exclusive interviews with mega stars such as Shahrukh Khan, Anil Kapoor, Priyanka Chopra, Akshay Kumar, Kajol, Deepika Padukone, Sanjay Dutt and John Abraham have been featured on the show as well as behind the scenes features of hit Bollywood films, such as Khiladi 786. Eesha Gupta has also made a special appearance in studio.

That's Entertainment is currently working increasing their coverage of artists based in the UAE in an effort to promote local talent. They've already featured local acts including Bull Funk Zoo, Nikotin and Jay Wud.

== Team ==
=== Marwan DJ Bliss, presenter ===
Marwan Parham Al Awadhi (commonly known as DJ Bliss) is an Emirati disc jockey, emcee, TV presenter and radio personality working in Dubai. In addition to being actively involved in the nightclub and DJ scene in Dubai, he is known for his music production including co-producing Wyclef Jean and releasing his own single and compilation album The Projects. The album was released on BMGI Middle East and was top 10 on Middle East album chart of Virgin. He is also credited as one of the first Iranian DJ to go on world tour. He currently hosts the television show That's Entertainment on Dubai Oneas well as the radio show The Real Flava on Channel 4 in Dubai.

Bliss was born and raised in Dubai and began his career while still in high school. His brother taught him how to play both the guitar and drums which is what he attributes for his love of music. Bliss had a radio show while still in school and at the beginning of college. He was also in a band named KRAK (later changed to Cyanide) and also began to DJ at the same time, playing at parties of his friends. Bliss used to appear on Radio 1 as a guest DJ on Teenzpoint.com and Crazyspin.com.

Bliss is known as one of the top DJs in the Emirates. In 2005, he won the top prize at a Middle East DJ competition. This gave him the opportunity to DJ at Ministry of Sound, a renowned night club in London. He has also spun at private parties for musicians such as Kanye West and Akon. He performs in clubs such as People by Crystal where he hosts his 411 Nights. He has also toured internationally playing at venues in Mauritius, Paris, Barcelona, Hong Kong and Malaysia.

As part of his work on That's Entertainment, he has interviewed celebrities such as James Blunt, Nicki Minaj, and Paris Hilton.

In late 2011, Bliss released his first single entitled Everything About You. He followed up in 2012 with the release of his first music video entitled Let It Go. The video featured Canadian rapper Kardinal Offishall who also performed lyrics in the song. Bliss and Offishall originally met in 2009 when Offishall was on tour with Akon. In late 2012, it was announced that Bliss would part of the international judges panel for the 1st annual Dubai International Music Awards in November 2013 along with Hype Williams, SoFly and Nius, Woo Rhee, and Mokobé.

Bliss has been referred to as the "Middle East's representative of Beats" by Dr. Dre. In 2013 he flew to Miami to be featured in a Wyclef Jean song entitled Mid Life Crisis, which was produced by Bliss and Prince Q. Bliss is also the founder of Bliss Inc Entertainment, an events and promotion company based out of Dubai.

=== Dina Butti, co-presenter ===
Dina Butti is an Egyptian/Canadian TV presenter, writer and artist working in Dubai. She launched her television career in Dubai by training at CNN Arabia, reporting at the Dubai International Film Festival and interviewing her first celebrities. She briefly worked at MTV Arabia to help launch a new show called Hip Hop Na, which was aimed at finding new Arabic rappers. At the age of 23, Dina was hired as the Editor-in-Chief and principal writer of an international luxury wellness and lifestyle magazine titled Talise for the Jumeirah Group, which was awarded the Gold Award at the Dubai Print Awards in its first year of publication.

In 2009, Dina was given her first onscreen gig as a social scout on a weekly show called City Wrap. She continued to develop her presenting skills and eventually secured a full-time presenting position in 2010 when she became a reporter and relief host for Studio One. In 2012, Butti joined Dubai One's flagship show, Out and About, for two months as a relief host and writer. In the meantime, Dina began doing voiceovers and conducting interviews for That's Entertainment with celebrities The Jacksons, Il Divo, Kajol, Jason Momoa, Chris Daughtry and Akshay Kumar. In 2013, Dina joined That's Entertainment full-time, presenting segments of the show alongside the host Marwan DJ Bliss while continuing to conduct celebrity interviews and reporting behind the scenes of local film and music productions.

While working full-time in television, Dina has freelanced for a number of projects. In 2010, she spent her weekends working as a production assistant on the set of Mission: Impossible – Ghost Protocol while filming scenes at the Burj Khalifa and DIFC alongside Tom Cruise, Simon Pegg and Jeremy Renner. Later in the year, she contributed articles reviewing Arabic albums to Rolling Stone Middle East's first edition. In 2011, Dina began regularly emceeing for events and also established herself as a voiceover artist, regularly voicing promos and trailers for television. In 2011, Dina briefly filled in for radio host, Priti Malik, presenting the gossip on The Kris Fade Show on Virgin Radio Dubai and she reappeared on radio in 2013 when she co-hosted a week of Dubai Today on [Dubai Eye].

In 2012, Dina and her husband, Omar Butti, were selected as part of Ahlan!'s annual Hot 100 list in the Trendsetters category. Their residence was also featured on the Ahlan! Hot 100 Homes list for the same year. In 2012, Dina was selected as a Finalist for the Best In Dubai Awards in the 'Best Personality' category. In 2013, both Dina and Omar joined Tag Heuer's Middle East Celebrity Club, becoming ambassadors for the luxury Swiss watch brand.

=== Hollywood film and TV interviewees ===
- Tom Cruise
- Gerard Butler
- Kim Kardashian
- Gwyneth Paltrow
- Paris Hilton
- Jeremy Renner
- Lewis Hamilton
- Paula Patton
- Selena Gomez
- John Travolta
- Warwick Davis
- Manu Bennett
- Jason Momoa
- Sean Astin
- Max Landis
- Kris Jenner
- Shailene Woodley

=== Singer/band interviews ===
- Jennifer Lopez
- The Jacksons
- 50 Cent
- Metallica
- Guns N' Roses
- Il Divo
- Neyo
- Charice
- Ronan Keating
- Sean Paul
- Akon
- Eve
- The Script
- Quincy Jones
- Jay Sean
- The Fray
- A R Rahman
- Olly Murs
- Carlos Santana
- Tiesto
- Nicki Minaj
- Usher
- Wyclef Jean
- Enrique Iglesias
- Eraserheads
- Ciara
- Jason Derulo
- Carlos Santana
- Daughtry
- Pete Murray
- Rita Ora
- Jason Derulo
- Incubus
- Ferry Corsten
- Bobby Valentino

=== Bollywood interviewees ===
- Shahrukh Khan
- Akshay Kumar
- Kajol
- Sunny Leone
- Manoj Bajpai
- Sophie Choudry
- Salman Khan
- Shahid Kapoor
- Imran Khan
- Katrina Kaif
- Ali Zafar
- Esha Gupta
- Priyanka Chopra
- John Abraham
- Anil Kapoor
- Deepika Padukone
- Karisma Kapoor
- Anupam Kher
- Juhi Chawla
- Zarine Khan
- Malaika Arora Khan
- Hrithik Roshan
- Ranveer Singh
- Anushka Sharma
- Sonam Kapoor
