= Dubai Bling =

Reality television show

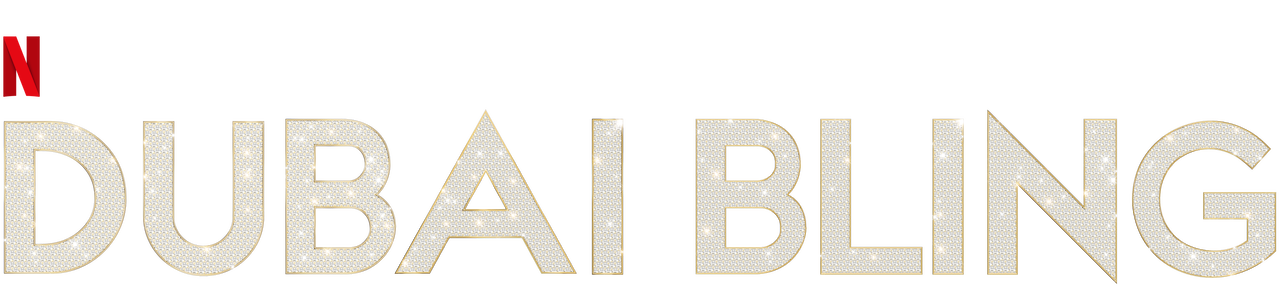
- Genre: Reality television
- Created by: Mazen Laham
- Developed by: Different Productions
- Showrunner: Marcel Dufour
- Country of origin: United Arab Emirates
- Original languages: Arabic; English
- No. of seasons: 3
- No. of episodes: 25

Production
- Executive producers: Mazen Laham; Lama Samad
- Producer: Toni Kanaan (tonitremendo)
- Cinematography: Samir Mezher

Original release
- Network: Netflix
- Release: October 27, 2022 – present

Dubai Bling is a bilingual reality television show which portrays a diverse group of millionaires residing in Dubai. Produced by Mazen Laham, its first season was released on Netflix on October 27, 2022. A second season debuted on December 13, 2023. A third season was released on January 8, 2025.

== Overview ==
The show features a group of individuals showing off their material wealth. While there are some moments that highlight what some of the cast members' jobs are like, most of the series revolves around shopping, dinners, parties, and other events. It also revolves around their interpersonal relationships, which leads to lots of gossip.

=== Season 1 ===
Season 1 showcased the story of real estate expert Zeina Khoury confronting influencer Farhana Bodi. The season also showed Loujain "LJ" Adada going on a blind date and Safa discussing her living situation with her husband. There is also a big fight between Danya & Zeina, spliiting the crew in half. It Is also observed that the cast were part of many arguments & truces throughout most of the season as it goes on. The last episode observed Farhana showing her worth to the cast, 'LJ' finally speaking to her mother, after not seeing her for many years..

=== Season 2 ===
The season begins with entrepreneur Ebraheem Al Samadi's wedding to his new wife, Hamdah, marking a significant event in the social circle. Beauty queen Mona Kattan joins the cast, bringing her business acumen and personal experiences into the spotlight & her Kayali perfume business. Safa Siddiqui, now a mother for 2, becomes a central figure, engaging in feuds and backstabbing, particularly targeting Farhana Bodi, which leads to explosive confrontations. The season is characterized by lavish parties, stunning skylines, and jaw-dropping fashion, maintaining the show's signature display of luxury. As the episodes progress, cast members navigate personal and professional challenges, with relationships tested and alliances shifting. The finale concludes on a major cliffhanger, with LJ's boyfriend, Hasnain Lehri, Proposing to her at Suhoor.

=== Season 3 ===
Season 3 of Dubai Bling is packed with even more glitz, glamour, and high-stakes drama. The season kicks off with Farhana Bodi finding herself at odds with both Safa Siddiqui and Zeina Khoury, confronting them at Mona Kattan's New Years Party. As alliances crumble and betrayals come to light, fueling tensions at the group’s extravagant gatherings. An escalating rivalry between LJ and new cast member, Jwana Karim, whose feud dominates social circles with fiery confrontations and shocking revelations. Mahira achieves huge milestones. Ebraheem Al Samadi, fresh from the highs of last season, faces mounting drama with Bliss and Danya, as personal and professional lines blur in the spotlight. In the 2 last episodes, Zeina Khoury takes the group on a retreat. It ends in chaos as Ebraheem slips a secret & Ebraheem & DJ Bliss get physical. Again, the season ends on a cliffhanger, gearing viewers up for the next season.

== Cast ==
Timeline of the cast
Cast member	Seasons		
	1	2	3
Loujain "LJ" Adada	Main	Main	Main
Safa Siddiqui	Main	Main	Main
Fahad Siddiqui	Main	Main	Main
Zeina Khoury	Main	Main	Main
Hannah Al Azzi	Main	Main	Main
Farhana Bodi	Main	Main	Main
Marwan Al Awadhi (DJ Bliss)	Main	Main	Main
Ebraheem Al Samadi	Main	Main	Main
Danya Mohammed	Main	Main	Main
Kris Fade	Main	Main	Guest
Brianna Fade	Main	Main	Guest
Lojain Omran	Main	Main	
Mona Kattan		Main	Main
Hassan El Amin		Main	Main
Jwana Karim			Main
Mahira Abdel Aziz			Main
Friends of Dubai
Fadie Musallet	Friend		
Salem Khammas		Friend	Friend
Model Roz			Friend

== Episodes ==
Series	Episodes	Originally released
1	8	27 October 2022
2	8	13 December 2023
3	9	8 January 2025

=== Season 1 (2022) ===
No. overall	No. in season	Title	Original release date
1	1	"Habibi, Welcome to Dubai"	27 October 2022
2	2	"Rumor has it"	27 October 2022
3	3	"Closed Circle"	27 October 2022
4	4	"Love Season"	27 October 2022
5	5	"Ticking Time Bomb"	27 October 2022
6	6	"Sail Away"	27 October 2022
7	7	"Too Late?"	27 October 2022
8	8	"Hitched"	27 October 2022

=== Season 2 (2023) ===
No. overall	No. in season	Title	Original release date
9	1	"Back in Bling Town!"	13 December 2023
10	2	"Don’t Mess With the Besties"	13 December 2023
11	3	"To Tea, or Not to Tea?"	13 December 2023
12	4	"Pretty Peace?"	13 December 2023
13	5	"Start From Scratch"	13 December 2023
14	6	"Undercover in India"	13 December 2023
15	7	"Set the Stage on Fire"	13 December 2023
16	8	"Marry Me?"	13 December 2023

=== Season 3 (2025) ===
No. overall	No. in season	Title	Original release date
17	1	"Peace, You Said?"	8 January 2025
18	2	"Who's The Company?"	8 January 2025
19	3	"Moment of Truth? Or Not Yet!"	8 January 2025
20	4	"Turning Tables"	8 January 2025
21	5	"A Costly Apology"	8 January 2025
22	6	"Nothing Left Unsaid"	8 January 2025
23	7	"There's A Time For Everything!"	8 January 2025
24	8	"Trust Shattered"	8 January 2025
25	9	"Will Time Heal?"	8 January 2025
