= Faraz Javed =

American TV journalist, presenter and producer (born 1984)

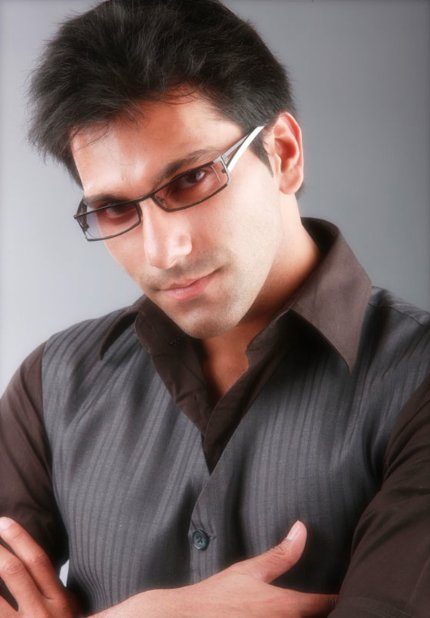
- Born: 20 October 1984 (age 41); Dubai, UAE
- Education: Class of 2006, University at Buffalo, NY, USA
- Years active: 2006 – present
- Known for: Producer / On-Air Talent / Actor
- Notable work: ABC News WXYZ-TV, Studio One, That's Entertainment

Faraz Javed is an Emmy Award-winning television journalist, presenter, and producer who has worked in the United States and United Arab Emirates for broadcasters including MTV Networks, part of Viacom Media Networks and Dubai One, Dubai Media Incorporated.

== Career ==
Javed works for ABC News in Detroit at WXYZ-TV. He has covered a variety of stories, from breaking news, to political agendas and issues that impact people across Michigan. Javed is also part of the network's weekend morning team.

Javed was previously seen as one of the news anchors and senior reporters at Emirates News, Dubai One TV. The program broadcasts from a Dubai Media City studio. However, Javed also reported breaking news from various locations across the United Arab Emirates, covering major events such as the Emirates Mars Mission and Abraham Accords among others. In addition to his duties at Dubai One TV, Javed also had his reality series on CrossFit on dubai On demand, one of Dubai's leading YouTube channels.

He has produced a number of television series including That's Entertainment, Hayati Amali, Studio One, Peeta Planet (Consulting Producer) and Mouth Piece. He has also worked on various commercials, infotainment videos, short films, music videos, and feature films such as Mission: Impossible – Ghost Protocol and Star Trek Beyond.

Javed is also associated with various radio stations in the United States and United Arab Emirates. He has hosted 'Kickstart' on PZR 91.1 FM broadcasting in Michigan and co-hosted with Ray Addison on Dubai Eye 103.8.,

Alongside producing, Javed is an actor, appearing in a number of plays, short films and commercials.

A sports enthusiast, Javed has been trained in Brazilian jiu-jitsu, boxing, swimming, horse riding and Crossfit.

== List of interviews ==
=== Hollywood film and TV interviews ===
- Ben Stiller
- Eva Longoria
- Susan Sarandon
- Simon Baker
- Priyanka Chopra
- Alexandra Burke
- Jay Leno
- Kelly Hu
- Sarah, Duchess of York
- Madeleine Stowe
- Gina Torres
- Sarah Rafferty
- Jodi Benson
- Patrick Renna
- James Jude Courtney
- Che Pope

=== Bollywood film and TV interviews ===
- Shah Rukh Khan
- Salman Khan
- Ranveer Singh
- Priyanka Chopra
- Vaani Kapoor
- Shilpa Shetty

=== Athlete interviews ===
- Rio Ferdinand
- Mo Farah

=== Political figure interviews ===
- John Rakolta
