= World of Sports =

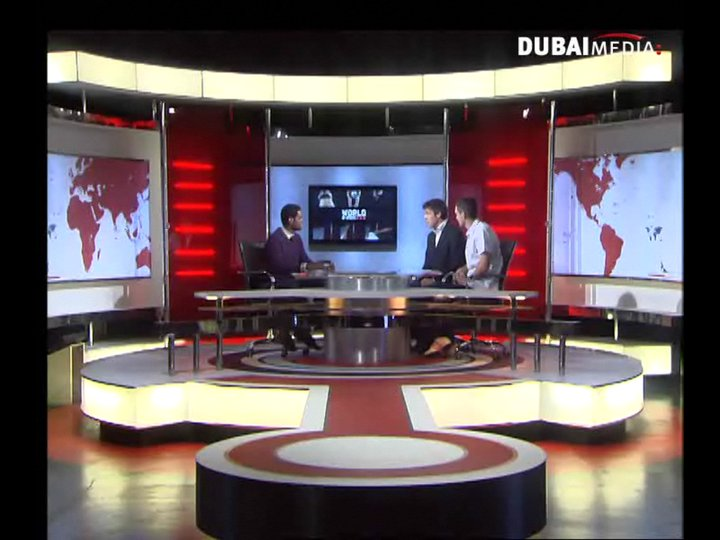
- WOS Season One
- Created by: Ray Addison
- Starring: Layne Redman (Season One); Tom Urquhart (Season Two); Omar Butti (Season Two)
- Country of origin: UAE
- No. of series: 2
- No. of episodes: 22 (Season One)

Production
- Producers: Ray Addison (Season One); Faraz Javed (Season Two); Omar Butti (Season Two); Graham Clews (Season Two)
- Running time: 30 mins (inc. ads)

Original release
- Network: Dubai One
- Release: 12 April 2010

Launched in April 2010, World of Sports was a weekly sports show airing on Dubai One and featuring a mixture of local and international sports highlights, studio and telephone interviews with sporting personalities and a variety of sports related features. Series One was hosted by Layne Redman with Tom Urquhart, Mark Pendergast, Noel Miller and Anas Bukhash appearing as regular studio guests. Series two saw a change in host with Tom Urquhart taking the hosting duties and a change in focus from the international sports of Season One to cover more local sporting events. The show was broadcast on Dubai One in the UAE at Dubai Media Incorporated's Maktoum Studios and could be viewed all over the middle east and Africa. Each episode debuted on Thursday nights at 20:00 UAE time (19:00 KSA) and was thirty minutes in duration.

== Presenters ==
Series	Presenter	Role
1	Layne Redman	Host
2	Tom Urquhart	Host
2	Omar Butti	Host
2	Graham Clews	Reporter

== Filming ==
The show was filmed at Studio F at DMI's Maktoum studios in Dubai in the United Arab Emirates.
