= Dina Butti =

Egyptian-Canadian TV presenter

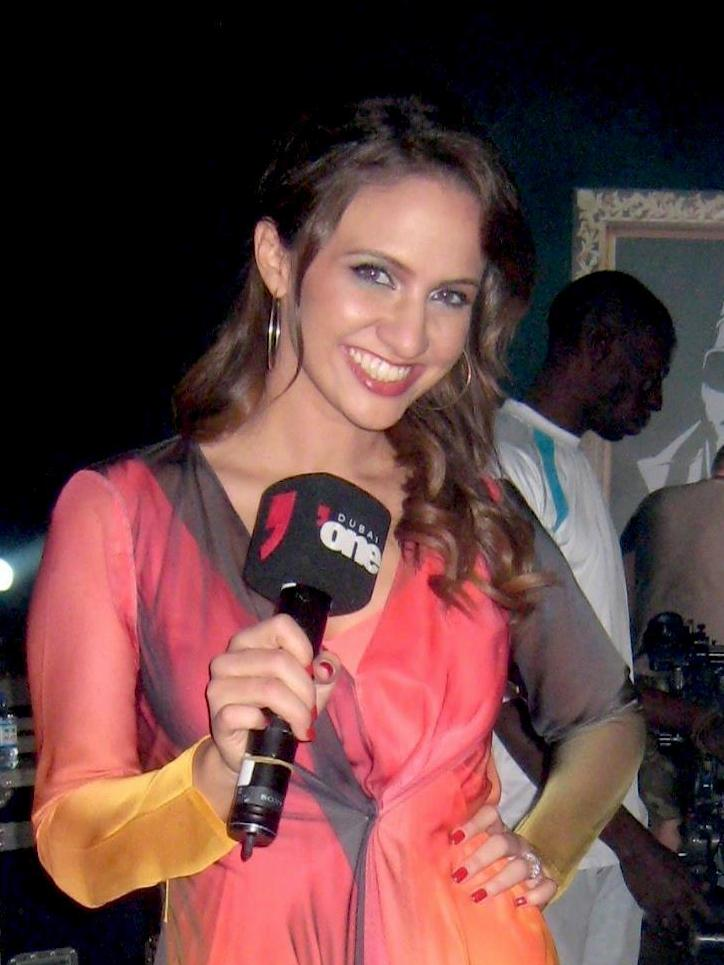
- Dina Butti behind the scenes at Imran Khan music video shoot
- Born: 28 November 1984 (age 41); Athens, Greece
- Occupations: TV Presenter, Content Creator, Voiceover Artist
- Years active: 2006–present
- Spouse: Omar Butti
- Children: 2

Dina Butti is an Egyptian/Canadian TV presenter, content creator and voiceover artist. She is most known as a TV presenter on the United Arab Emirates’ English television channel, Dubai One, where she co-hosted the channel's celebrity program, That's Entertainment, reported for their Expo 2020 Dubai daily live coverage and is currently hosting their evening lifestyle show, DXB Today.

She is also recognized as a content creator, most popular for her #mushmusicals parody videos which reflect on the journey of motherhood. Dina has taken part in numerous campaigns with global brands such as Dyson, Gap, Johnson's, IKEA, Tag Heuer and Nike. In addition, Dina emcees and hosts social media lives, representing companies including Samsung, Virgin Megastore and Etisalat.

She is married to Emirati/American television presenter and producer, Omar Butti, and together they have two sons.

== Early life and background ==
Dina Butti was born as Dina El-Gamal in the capital of Greece, Athens. She spent her life moving around from one city to another, living in countries such as Canada, Saudi Arabia, Egypt, England and the United Arab Emirates.

In 2002, Butti attended Montreal's Concordia University and completed a major in studio arts and specializations in journalism and television. While finishing her studies for television, she produced, filmed, and edited a short documentary about moderate Muslims in Montreal which she submitted into a competition sponsored by Canada's National Film Board. The documentary was selected as one of the winners and was screened on CBC Television and at the One World Film Festival.

== Career ==
During her time at university, Butti worked as an extra for the Nickelodeon television show, 15/Love, as well as for Hollywood films, including King’s Ransom. In 2006, Butti spent her summer interning in Dubai at INTV and ITP. She completed an internship at CNN Arabia where she also landed her first freelance opportunity, reporting at the Dubai International Film Festival and interviewing her first celebrity, George Clooney.

=== Writing ===
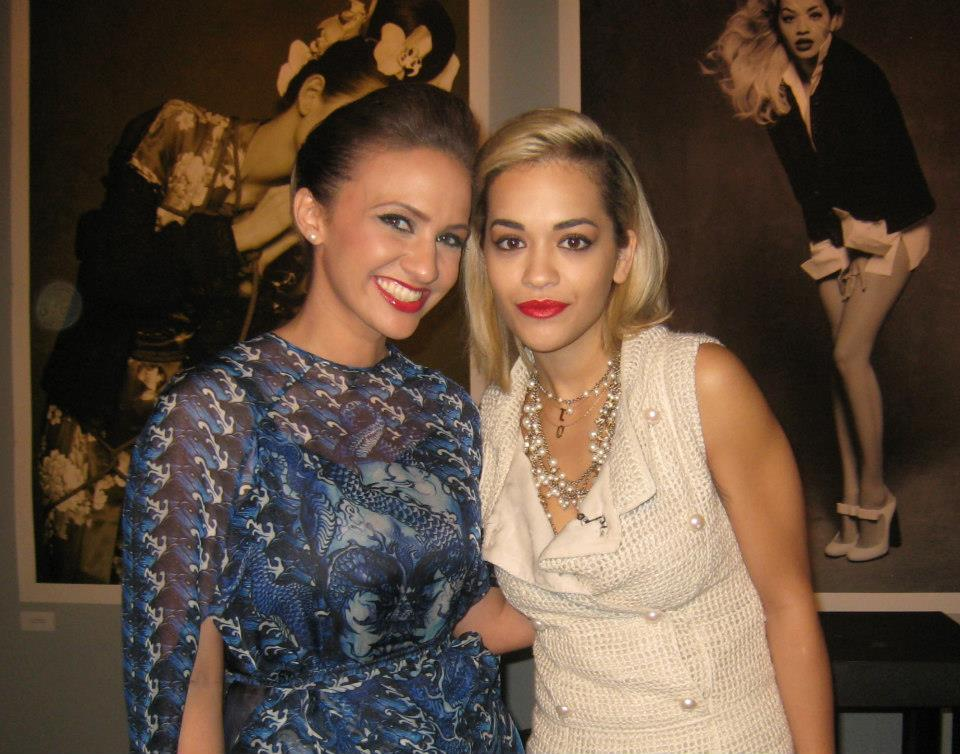
Dina with Rita Ora at Chanel's Little Black Jacket Event

At the age of 23, Butti was hired by an advertising and publishing agency to launch an international luxury wellness and lifestyle magazine titled Talise for Jumeirah Group. Despite her limited experience in print journalism, she became the editor and principal writer of the publication. Butti secured numerous celebrity interviews for the publication, including Celine Dion, Christina Aguilera and Karl Lagerfeld.

=== Presenting ===
In 2009, Dina auditioned for a show called 20 Something for Dubai One television. Although she was not selected, she was asked to join a new talk show for women as a researcher and writer. The show was cancelled and re-conceptualized into what would eventually become the daily lifestyle show, Studio One. In the meantime, Butti was given her first onscreen gig as a social scout on a weekly show called City Wrap. She eventually secured a full-time presenting position in 2010 when she became a reporter and relief host for Studio One.

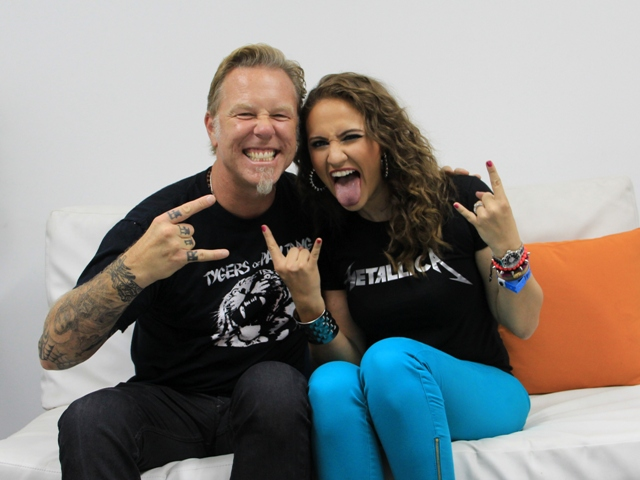
Dina Butti with James Hetfield of Metallica

As the lead reporter for Studio One, Butti became known for her quirkiness on camera and willingness to take part in the featured activities, including diving with sharks with the Discovery Channel’s Sharkman Mike Rutzen, racing with racecar driver Humaid Al Masaoud, dressing up as Super Girl at Comic Con, wrestling with MMA fighters and co-hosting with hyenas, snakes, and lions sitting beside her. During this time, Butti met and interviewed stars from various fields, including Ronan Keating, Kim Kardashian, WWE wrestler Chris Jericho, celebrity chef Marco Pierre White, comedian Al Murray, UB40’s lead singer Ali Campbell, model Helena Christensen, radio and television host Chris Tarrant, the creator of the Chicken Soup for the Soul series Jack Canfield, and Bollywood actors Anushka Sharma, Ranveer Singh and Rahul Bose. Butti also began reporting live from events around town, including the Dubai International Film Festival.

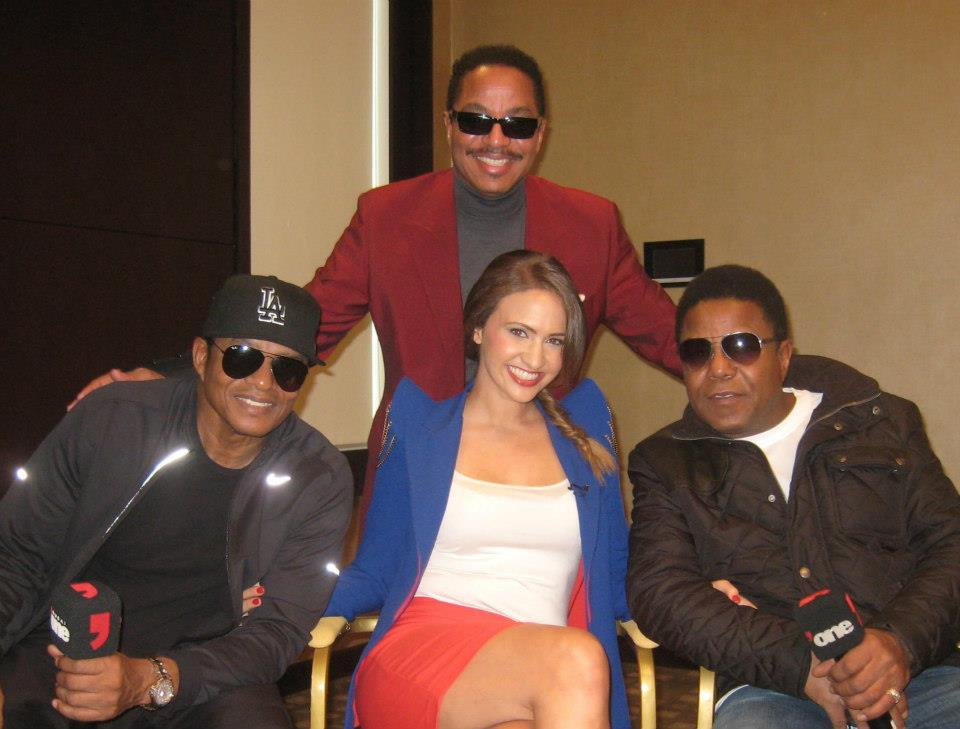
Butti interviewing The Jacksons

While working on Studio One and Out and About, Butti began doing voiceovers and conducting interviews for the Dubai One Channel's That's Entertainment with celebrities including Gerard Butler, Jason Derulo, The Jacksons, Il Divo, Kajol, Jason Momoa, Chris Daughtry and Akshay Kumar.

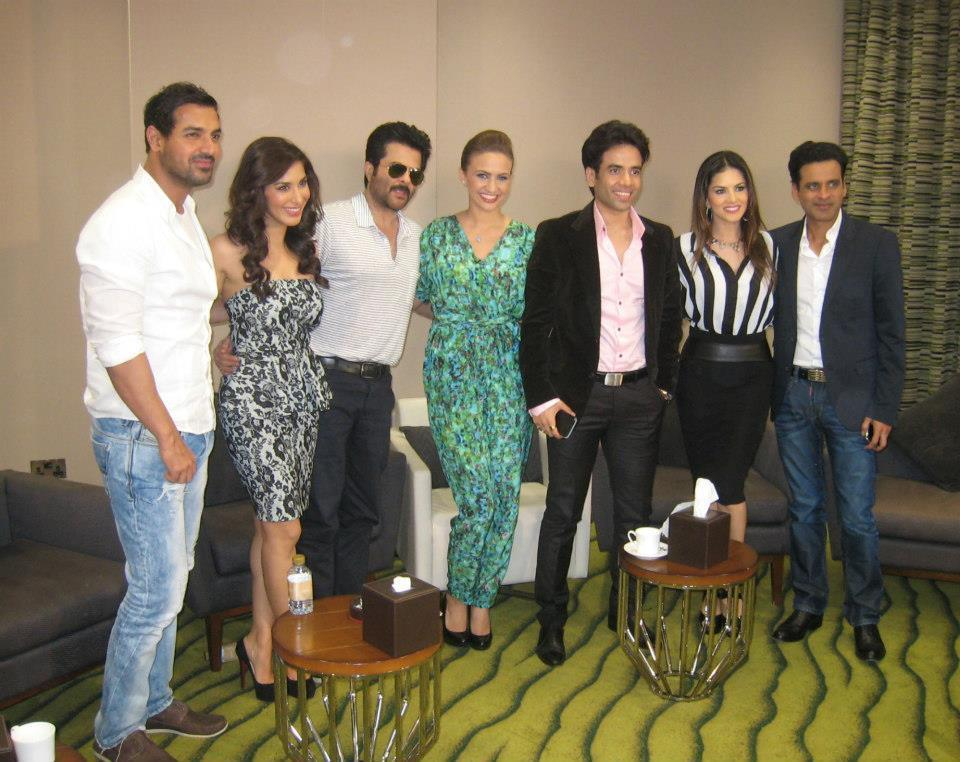
Butti at press conference with Bollywood Stars

Dina has since interviewed Hollywood A-listers for That's Entertainment including John Travolta, Martin Sheen, Matthew McConaughey, Eva Longoria, Susan Sarandon, Jared Leto, Blake Lively, Khloe Kardashian and Nelly. She has also established herself in the local Bollywood scene after meeting and interviewing heavyweights like Shahrukh Khan, Kareena Kapoor, Priyanka Chopra, Anil Kapoor, Deepika Padukone, Ranbir Kapoor, John Abraham, Imran Khan, Sonakshi Sinha and Bipasha Basu.

In August 2014, Dubai One announced they would no longer be producing local content. The change incited Dina to join forces with former Dubai One producer Reim El Houni, a host of former Dubai One presenters and a few additional local personalities to launch Dubai's first official English language YouTube channel called "Dubai ON Demand". In December 2014 at the Dubai International Film Festival, the team held a press conference to make the announcement - at which point they began uploading content from the festival, a number of high-profile interviews and pilots for the nine lifestyle shows they introduced.

In the months following the announcement of the channel, Dina reestablished her role as an entertainment presenter by interviewing stars like James Blunt, Liam Neeson, John Abraham and Nicole Richie. It was during this time that Dina also began acknowledging her pregnancy with her first child by asking celebrities for parenting advice.

=== Freelance work ===
While working full-time in television, Butti freelanced for a number of projects.

In 2010, she worked as a production assistant on the set of Mission: Impossible – Ghost Protocol while filming scenes at the Burj Khalifa and DIFC alongside Tom Cruise, Simon Pegg and Jeremy Renner.

In 2011, Dina joined the Bareface talent agency and began regularly emceeing for events, including Games ‘12, Gourmet Abu Dhabi, Cityscape, Arab Health Summit and the Global Entrepreneurship Summit in Dubai.

In 2011, Butti briefly filled in for radio host, Priti Malik, presenting the gossip on The Kris Fade Show on Virgin Radio Dubai. In 2013, she also co-hosted the morning show on Dubai Eye.

=== Artwork ===
In 2011, she took part in Al Ghaf Gallery’s Ramadan Art Bazaar, exhibiting three paintings depicting cultural issues. That year, Butti also displayed and sold a number of pieces as part of a "Women in Art" exhibit at Courtyard Gallery. In both 2012 and 2013, she was asked to create her own ‘MEGA’ figure to be displayed at Dubai Mall. In 2014, Dina took part in a pop art exhibit at Galeries Lafayette where she displayed a new series of her abstract portraits. Later in the year, she was asked to transform a Gibson guitar into an artwork to be showcased at both Hard Rock Cafe and the Middle East Comic Con Festival.

== Personal life ==
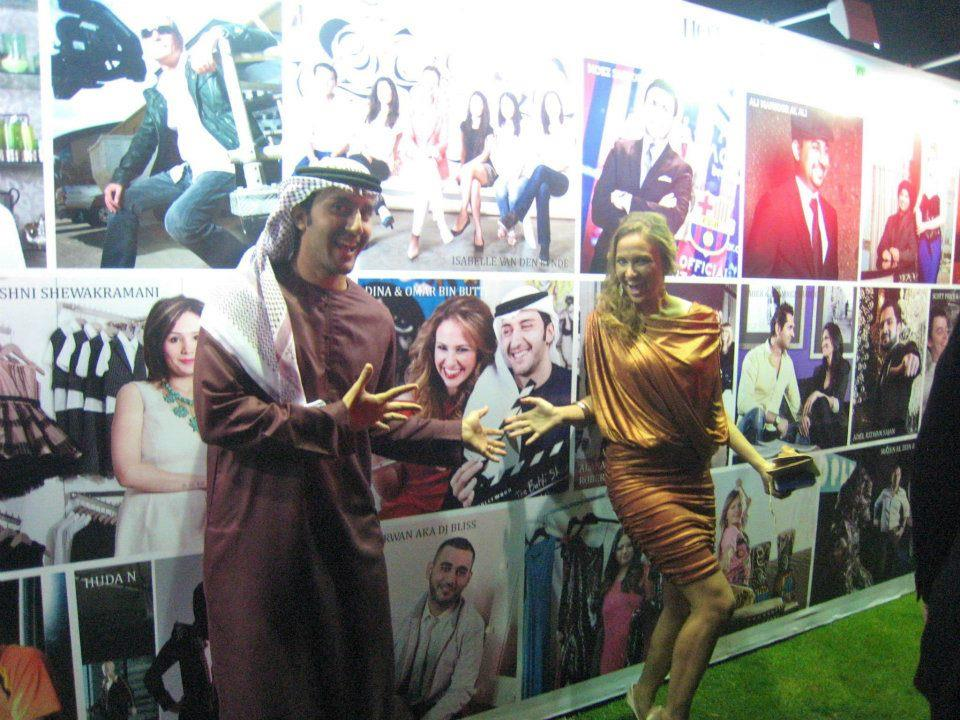
Dina and Omar Butti recognized for being part of Dubai's Hot 100

In 2010, Dina met her husband, Omar Butti, on her first day of work at Dubai One, where he continues to work as a presenter and producer for current affairs show, Emirates 24/7. Exactly one year after their first date, they were legally married at the Dubai Courts and shortly after celebrated with a TV themed wedding at the Atlantis the Palm. In May 2015, the couple gave birth to a baby boy. In December 2017, the couple welcomed their second son.

== Recognition ==
In 2012, Dina and her husband, Omar Butti, were selected as part of Ahlan!’s annual Hot 100 list in the Trendsetters category. Their residence was also featured on the Ahlan! Hot 100 Homes list for the same year. In 2012 and 2013, Dina was a finalist for the Best In Dubai Awards in the ‘Best Personality’ category. In 2013, both Butti and Omar joined Tag Heuer's Middle East Celebrity Club, becoming ambassadors for the luxury Swiss watch brand. In 2014, Dina was nominated for the prestigious 'Woman of the Year Award' by Emirates Women magazine in the artists category. In 2016, Dina's role as a mom presenter was rewarded when she was selected as a "Mother of the Year" by the city's most popular motherhood site, Sassy Mamas.

== List of Interviewees ==
=== Hollywood Film and TV Interviewees ===
- John Travolta
- Will Smith
- Gerard Butler
- Eva Longoria
- Kim Kardashian
- Khloe Kardashian
- Ty Burrell
- Matthew McConaughey
- Jared Leto
- Joshua Jackson
- Marlon Wayans
- Martin Sheen
- Paul Bettany
- Warwick Davis
- Jensen Ackles
- Taylor Kitsch
- Giancarlo Esposito
- Blake Lively
- Amy Adams
- Susan Sarandon
- Nicole Richie
- Nick Cannon
- Seth Green
- Manu Bennett
- Jason Momoa
- Sean Astin
- Max Landis
- Kathy Hilton
- Bob Odenkirk
- Jesse Metcalfe
- Jared Padalecki
- Tony Jaa
- Michael Jai White

=== Singer/Band Interviews ===
- Celine Dion
- The Jacksons
- James Blunt
- Metallica
- Guns N' Roses
- Il Divo
- Ronan Keating
- Hans Zimmer
- The Jacksons
- AR Rahman
- Eraserheads
- Jason Derulo
- Daughtry
- Nelly

=== Bollywood Interviewees ===
- Shahrukh Khan
- Akshay Kumar
- Ranveer Singh
- Kajol
- Sunny Leone
- Manoj Bajpai
- Sophie Choudry
- Shahid Kapoor
- Imran Khan
- Katrina Kaif
- Ali Zafar
- Priyanka Chopra
- John Abraham
- Anil Kapoor
- Deepika Padukone
- Karisma Kapoor
- Anupam Kher
- Juhi Chawla
- Zarine Khan
- Malaika Arora Khan
- Anushka Sharma

=== Fashion Designers ===
- John Galliano
- Carolina Herrera
- Reem Acra
- Tadashi Shoji
- Karl Lagerfeld
- Alexander McQueen
- Diane Von Furstenberg
- Dsquared2
