= Marta Yanci =

Spanish actress

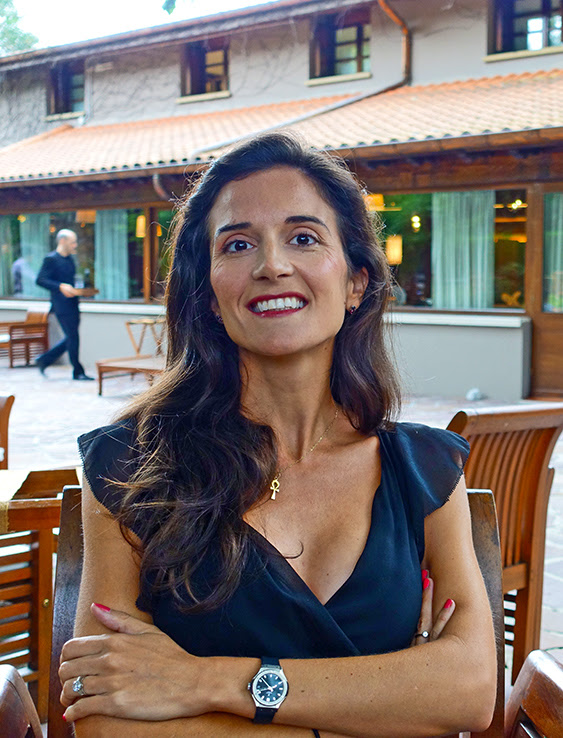
Marta Yanci, Spanish actress

Marta Yanci is a Spanish actress, voiceover artist, and former TV chef.

== Acting career ==
Her acting career has included roles in Spanish as well as English-speaking series and movies, including:

- Quarantine Leap (2020), the collaborative series made during the COVID pandemic
- Bosé (2023) as Miguel Bosé's sister, Lucía Dominiguín
- Balenciaga (2023) the chronicle of the rise of the designer Cristóbal Balenciaga from humble origins to fashion icon
- Amar es Para Siempre (2023) as Chantal Gigard, the French billionaire

She has also appeared in the television show Alpha Males, 4 Estrellas, Camisado, and Cimarrón.

== Voiceover artist ==
As a voiceover artist, Yanci has dubbed brands including Google and Amazon in both English and Spanish.

== Published author ==
Yanci has published two books:

- Respira, inspired by a true story of love and addiction during the Spanish dictatorship.
- El olor de las flores secas, a crime novel about a serial killer that seeks to kill pregnant women

== Early and personal life ==
Born in San Sebastián, Spain in 1980, she holds a degree in European Law from the Universite Libre de Bruxelles (ULB).

== TV chef ==
Yanci was known for her two seasons on the Canal Cocina Recetas a cinco euros show. She also was worked in Dubai managing an catering and restaurant business called Marta's Kitchen.
