= Layne Redman =

English television presenter, writer, and actor

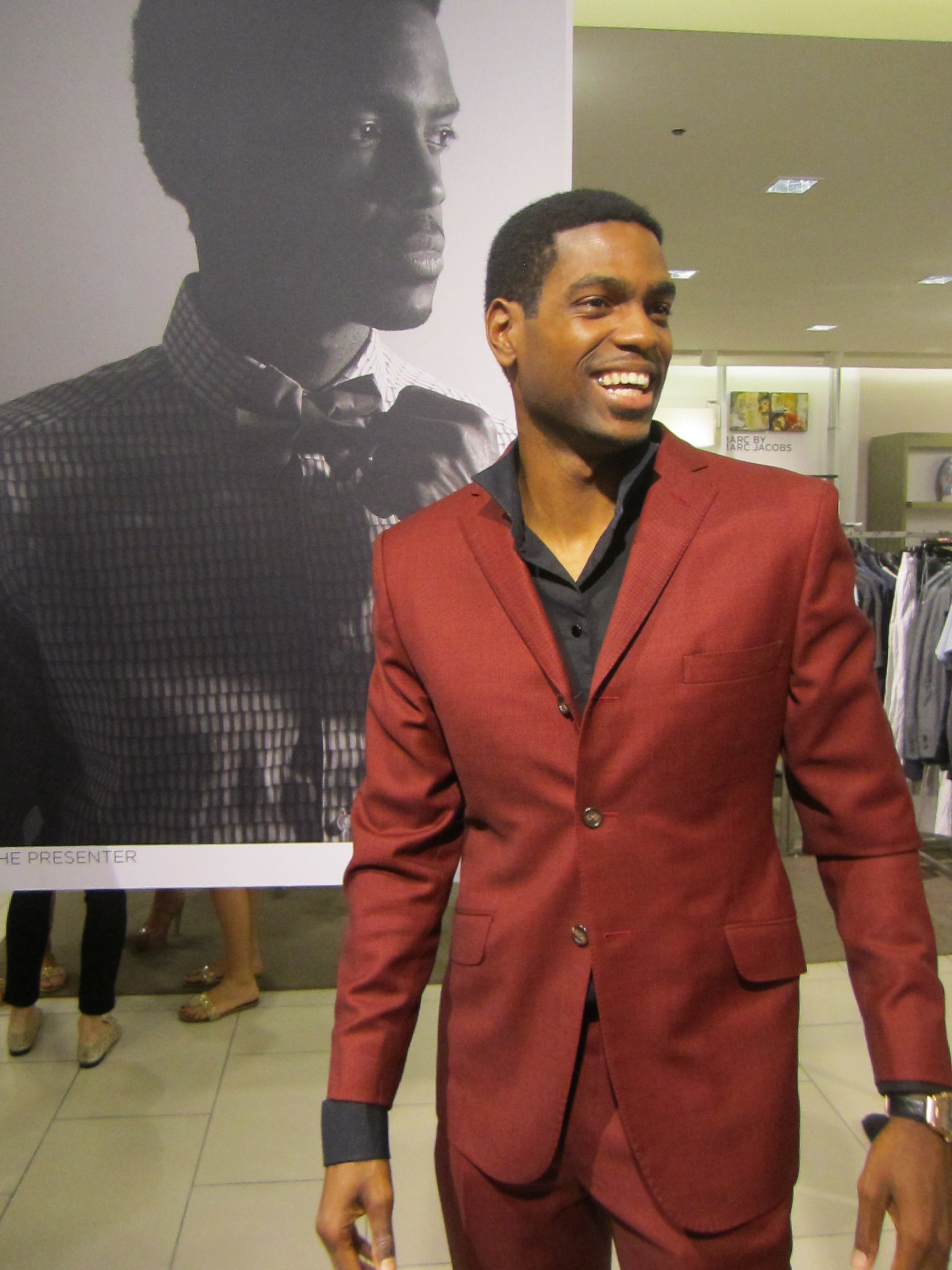
- Redman at the Emperor 1688 Exhibition, Saks Fifth Avenue, Dubai
- Born: 21 March; West Middlesex Hospital, West London, England, UK
- Occupations: Broadcaster, writer, actor, MC
- Years active: 1988–present
- Known for: Presenting: Out and About and World of Sports on Dubai One
- Height: 6ft 1in (1.87m)

Layne Redman is a British television presenter, writer and actor. He used to work in Dubai for English-language television channel Dubai One presenting Out & About.

== Early life and family ==
Redman was born in Isleworth, West London, to Afro-Caribbean parents and has two younger brothers. His mother is a singer who now lives in Jamaica.

He was brought up on the Green Dragon estate and educated at Green Dragon Primary School in Brentford and then onto the Isleworth and Syon School where he gained 7 GCSEs and played left-wing for the school rugby team.

He spent a small part of his youth living in the USA in Boston and New York City and spent a lot of time in St. James, Barbados, as a child.

Redman later returned to the UK where he acted in theatre at the Riverside Studios in Hammersmith with his mother as a part of the Black Theatre Co-operative (later named Nitro, now known as NitroBeat) that was formed in 1979 to give opportunities to black actors, singers, writers and directors and since then has been a primary force in the development of black theatre in the UK. The founding members were the cast of No Problem! a Channel 4 sitcom, Redman went on to be a backing dancer making appearances on stage and TV around the UK before studying business & finance at West Thames College, but still pursued a career in the performing arts as an actor and professional dancer.

== Marketing career ==
In 2002 Redman moved permanently to Dubai where he worked as an executive assistant for sports marketing agency, Proactive Sports Management, the same agency that looked after footballer Wayne Rooney where he was in training to be a sports agent. This was followed by a stint with Essentially Sports Management, the group that use to manage F1 driver Jenson Button and then on to Emaar Properties as part of the founding management team of their sports and fitness brand Hayya!

During this time Redman continued to work on international modelling assignments and promotional campaigns, appearing in numerous campaigns and TVCs for brands such as MTV, Sony Ericsson, Danone, Getty Images, Jumeirah and Shangri-La Hotels and Resorts.

== Move into television ==
In 2008 Redman was asked to do a screen test for Dubai One for their most popular and oldest running English language show Out & About, and became the new co-host for the start of the third season. The show is a "what's on" guide for the Emirates.

In 2010, Layne was the anchor of a new studio based sports magazine show World of Sports for Dubai One.

In both shows he has interviewed celebrities, including Jackie Stewart, Novak Djokovic, Bob Geldof and Macy Gray.

== Writing ==
In 2010 Redman started to write for Viva magazine a publication that belongs to the ITP Publishing Group as an agony uncle and also later on for Cosmopolitan magazine.

== Recognition ==
In 2010 Redman was nominated as the Best Male Personality at the Ahlan! Live Best in Dubai Awards.

March 2011 Layne was selected as one of the 16 most prolific and inspirational personalities in Dubai by the Golkar brothers of the brand Emperor 1688.

In October 2011 Redman was nominated as Best TV Presenter in Dubai at the Ahlan! Live Best in Dubai Awards. And he was announced as the winner on 30 November 2011 at the award ceremony at Raffles Hotel in Dubai, as well as the Out and About show winning best TV show.

In May 2012 the Out and About show also picked up best TV show at the Ahlan Best in Abu Dhabi awards.

In April 2013, he was chosen as one of the best dressed and stylish men in the Middle East by men's magazine Esquire.

=== Endorsements ===
Redman has been supported and been an ambassador for many brands since making the move onto television, including the New Era Cap Company, Lacoste, Merc Clothing and Nike, Inc.
