= Islamic Affairs and Charitable Activities Department =

Government agency of Dubai, UAE

- دائرة الشؤون الإسلامية والعمل الخيري
- Abbreviation: IACAD
- Website: www.iacad.gov.ae

The Islamic Affairs and Charitable Activities Department (IACAD) is an agency of the government of Dubai, United Arab Emirates.

It was founded on October 24,1969. The department was originally known as the Department of Awqaf, and it was responsible for awqaf (in Islamic law, a religious endowment). Subsequently Islamic affairs were added to the department's responsibilities.
