= Dubai One =

Pan-Emirati English language television channel

- Country: United Arab Emirates
- Broadcast area: Middle East; North Africa
- Network: Dubai Channels Network
- Headquarters: Dubai Media City, Dubai, United Arab Emirates

Programming
- Language: English
- Picture format: 1080p 16:9, HDTV, MPEG-4

Ownership
- Owner: Dubai Media Incorporated
- Sister channels: Dubai TV; Sama Dubai; Noor Dubai; Dubai Zaman; Dubai Sports

History
- Launched: 14 May 1994; 32 years ago (as Ch33); 24 December 2004; 21 years ago (as One TV); 2007; 19 years ago (as Dubai One)
- Former names: Ch33 (1994–2004); One TV (2004–2007)

Links
- Website: www.dubaione.ae

Dubai One (formerly known as Ch33 and then One TV) is an Emirati English language entertainment television channel, owned by Dubai Media Incorporated. It was launched on 14 May 1994, and is currently managed by Sarah al Jarman. It airs a mix of locally produced and international syndicated content that caters English language and non-Arab viewers in the MENA region. It started broadcasting in HD on Nilesat 201 on 28 February 2019.

== Background ==
Dubai One broadcasts subtitled Western content targeting Arabs and expatriates living in Dubai and around the Arab world. While most of the production is centralized at DMI's own studios, the channel has its own management, team, structure and strategy. The flow of advertising for it is controlled by Choueiri Group, through its subsidiary MEMS.

== History ==
Former logo of One TV (2004–2007)

The channel was launched as a replacement for Channel 33. One TV launched at 9 am on 24 December 2004, bearing a new name with brand new programming targeting the expat community and westernized Arabs. The new offer consisted largely of imports coming in from the United States and the United Kingdom, with all programming being subtitled to Arabic. The new channel did not broadcast news and aired five feature films every day; all of them newer releases. The channel had few carryovers from the former Channel 33; one notable absence was The Bold and the Beautiful, which was not in the initial line-up following the 2004 rename. After complaints from viewers, the series returned.

In early 2007, following the results of a six-month survey, One TV was renamed Dubai One.

== Programming ==
Generally, Dubai One broadcasts syndicated programming from the United States and occasionally from Canada, the United Kingdom and Australia. Owing to its special partnerships with Warner Bros. and Walt Disney Studios, the channel currently offers at least four films per day from 5 pm (GMT) to 12 midnight (GMT), and has screened to date more than 300 films. Bollywood films are shown once a month, on a Thursday at 7 pm (GMT). Dubai One also repeats programming it has broadcast during the week on Fridays, known as Catch Up Fridays.

The channel broadcasts also a variety of in-house productions including Emirates News, Dubai One Minute and The London Show. Previous productions include Emirates 24/7, World of Sports, Studio One, That's Entertainment and Understanding Islam.

== On air staff ==
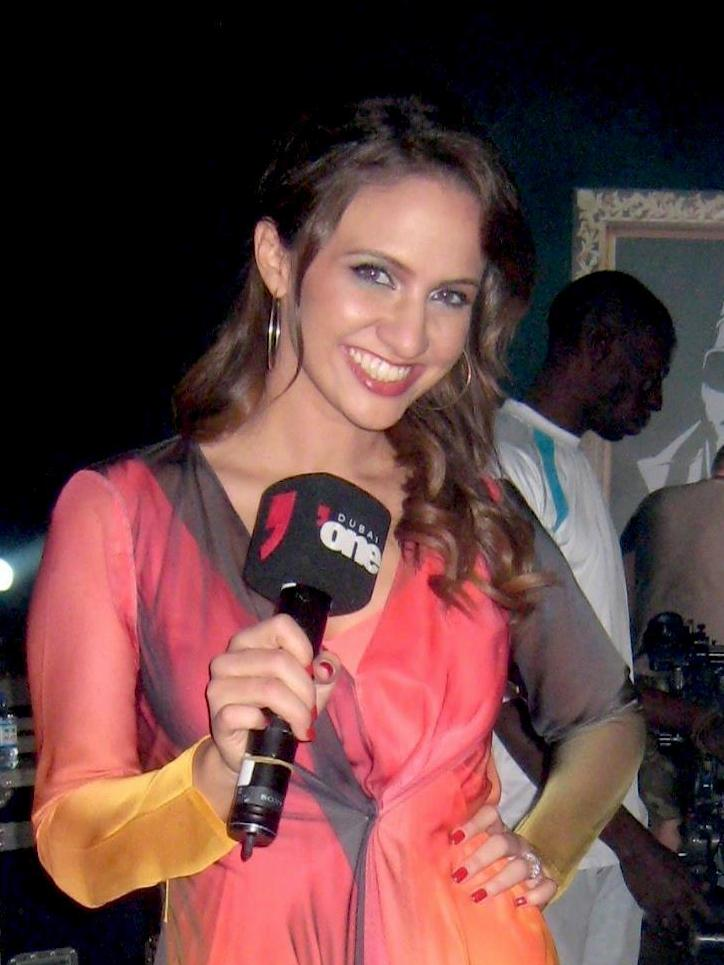
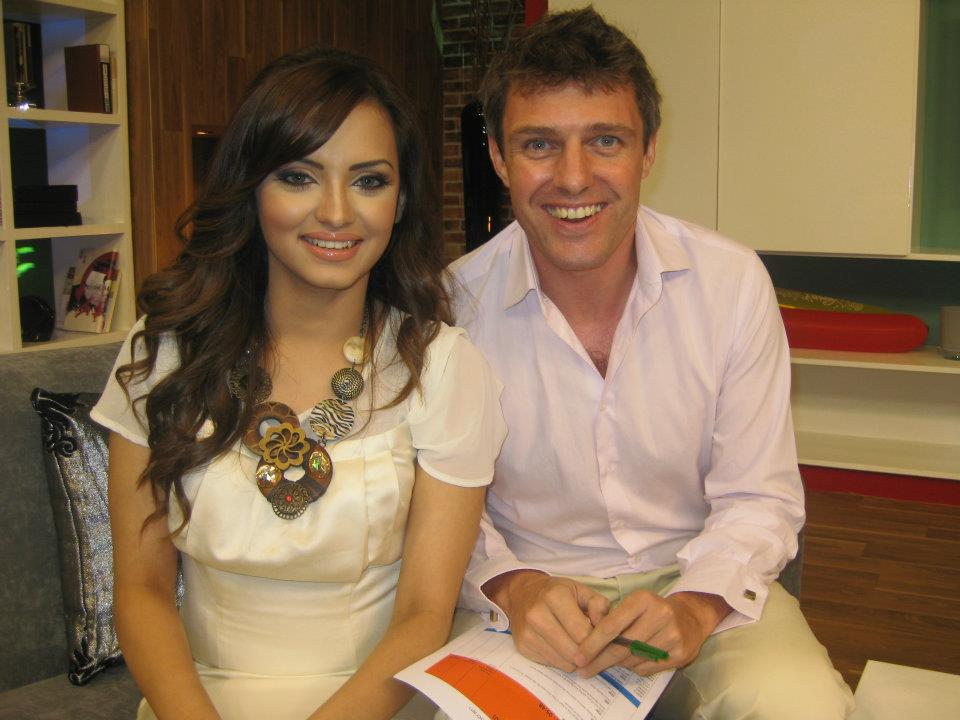
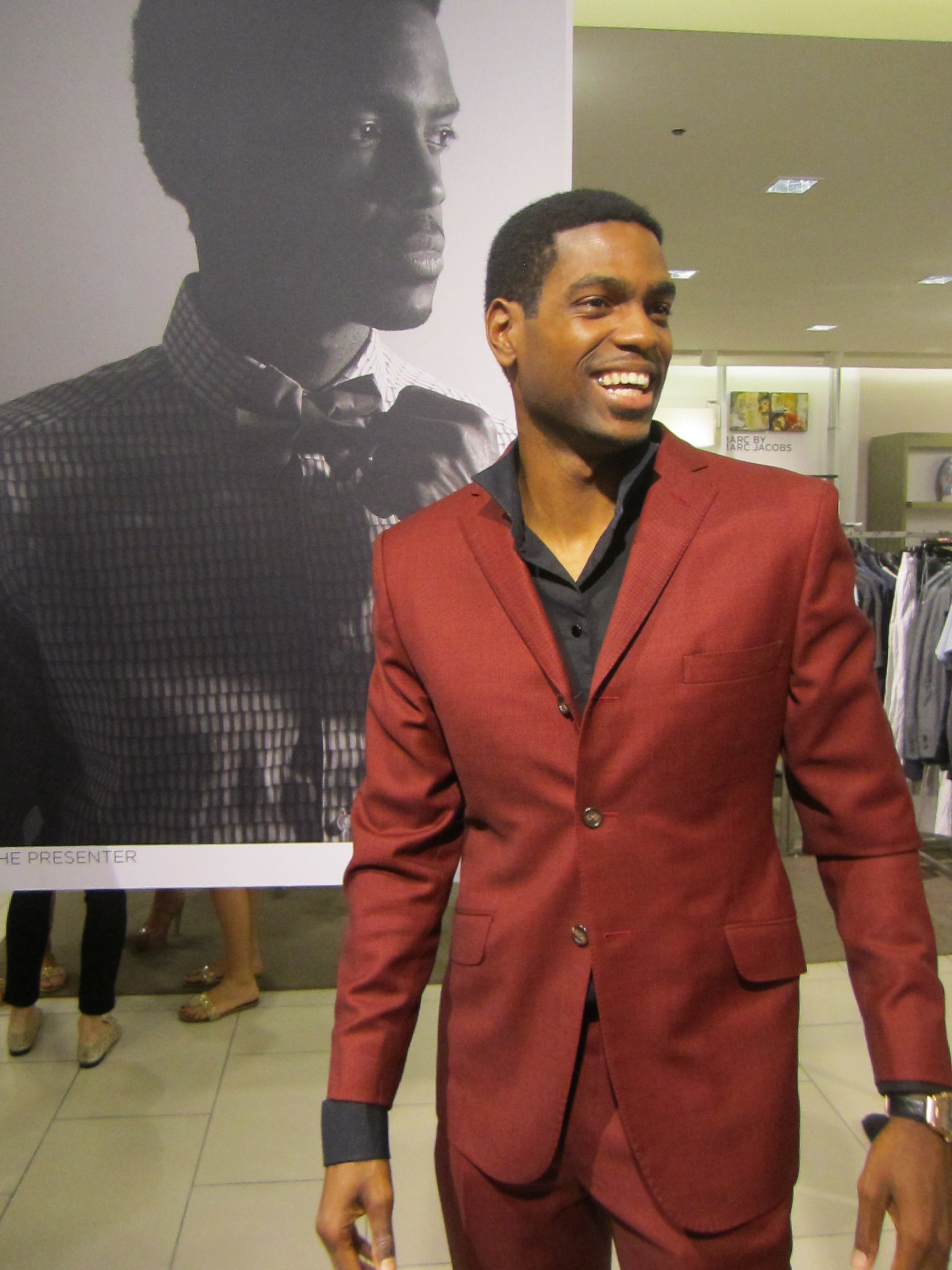
From left to right: Dina Butti; Aishwarya Ajit and Tom Urquhart; and Layne Redman, hosts of some Dubai One shows
- Yunus Saif @yunussaif
- Greg Fairlie @gregfairlie
- Amal Al Jabry
- Dareen Abu Ghaida
- Aishwarya Ajit
- Ray Addison
- Marwan Al Awadhi
- Leila ben Khalifa
- Dina Butti
- Omar Butti
- Graham Clews
- Faraz Javed
- Priyanka Dutt
- Ramia Farrage
- Katie Jensen
- Rebecca McLaughlin
- Layne Redman
- Tom Urquhart
- Punam Verma

== See also ==
- Dubai Media Incorporated
- Television in the United Arab Emirates
