= Ahlan! =

Magazine

Ahlan! magazine is an English language celebrity weekly, launched in the UAE in April 2003, by ITP Publishing Group, under the tagline "International Glamour and Local Style". Its launch editor was Graham Stacey. Ahlan! spawned two offshoots - Ahlan! Masala (November 2003) and an Arabic-language edition (2004). Katie Heskett became editor of Ahlan!, in 2005. Former Mail on Sunday diarist Nathan Kay took over the editorship in January 2011. On 26 May 2011 the magazine underwent a complete rehaul with new sections, fonts and look.

The magazine is audited by the BPA. The BPA audited circulation of the weekly was 20,186 copies for the last six months of 2011. For the first six-month period of 2013 the magazine had a circulation of 20,586 copies.
