= Zeina =

Zeina is a feminine given name. It is one of the variants that include Zina, Zena and the feminine version of the male given name Zein.

Zeina may refer to:

== People ==
=== Zeina ===
- Zeina (actress) (born 1977), Egyptian actress and model
- Zeina (singer), Canadian pop singer
- Zeina Abirached (born 1981), Lebanese illustrator, graphic novelist and comic artist
- Zeina Akar (born c. 1964), Lebanese politician and social scientist
- Zeina Talal Arslan, an Emira, the wife of Lebanese politician Emir Talal Arslan
- Zeina Awad, Lebanese news correspondent
- Zeina Hashem Beck, Lebanese poet
- Zeina Daccache, Lebanese actress and director
- Zeina Khodr, Lebanese broadcast journalist
- Zeina Mickawy (born 1998), Egyptian squash player
- Zeina Mina (born 1963), Lebanese Olympic athlete
- Zeina Nassar, German boxer of Lebanese descent
- Zeina Shaban (born 1988), Jordanian table tennis player
- Zeina Soufan, Lebanese journalist and television host
- Zeina el Tibi, French–Lebanese journalist
- Zeina Yazigi, Syrian journalist, reporter and television news anchor

=== Zeïna ===
- Zeïna Sahelí (born 1983), Senegalese swimmer

== Others ==
- Tevragh-Zeina, Mauritanea
- FC Tevragh-Zeina, Mauritanean football club based in the Tevragh-Zeina

== See also ==
- Zina (given name)
- Zena (given name)
- Zein (disambiguation)
