= Zena =

Zena may refer to:

== Places ==
- Zena, New York, United States, a hamlet
- Zena, Oklahoma, United States, a census-designated place
- Zena, Oregon, United States, a ghost town
- Genoa, Italy, known as "Zêna" in the Ligurian language

== People ==
- Zena (given name)
- Zinaida Kupriyanovich or ZENA, Belarusian singer

== See also ==
- Zenas (disambiguation)
- Zina (disambiguation)
- Xena (disambiguation)
