= Dubai Towers =

Dubai Towers may refer to:

- Dubai Towers Doha, a skyscraper under construction in Doha, Qatar
- Dubai Towers Dubai, a proposed four skyscraper complex in Dubai, United Arab Emirates

== See also ==
- Dubai Mixed-Use Towers, a hotel tower and a residential tower in Dubai, United Arab Emirates
