= Freej =

- The cast of Freej, clockwise from front to right Um Saeed, Um Saloom, Um Allawi, Um Khammas
- Created by: Mohammed Saeed Harib
- Written by: Najla El Shihi (2006–2007); Amna El Mansoori (2007–present)
- Starring: Um Saeed, Um Alawi, Um Khammas, Um Saloom,
- Country of origin: United Arab Emirates
- No. of episodes: 70

Production
- Running time: approx. 15 minutes (per episode)

Original release
- Network: Dubai TV; Sama Dubai TV; Cartoon Network Arabic; Majid Kids TV; Eyes Studio Channels Global; TV3 (Malaysian TV network); Shahid (2024-present)
- Release: September 24, 2006 – present

Freej (Arabic: فريج; trademarked as FREEJ) is an Emirati CGI television series for children. The English tagline for the show is The Fun Old Girls.

The show was produced by Mohammed Saeed Harib, who also directed the fifteen standalone episodes of fifteen minutes each. It is the tale of four old Emirati women living in a secluded neighbourhood in modern-day Dubai. The show's main characters - Um Saeed, Um Saloom, Um Allawi and Um Khammas - try to live a peaceful life in the midst of the ever-expanding city around them, but the city's boom unveils new social issues every day that they would have to tackle in their own simple way. For those four old women, there is no issue too hard to crack with a good cup of coffee at Um Saeed's house.

The show's title is a reference to "freej", a term which means "neighbourhood" in Emirati Arabic. Freej, originally produced in Arabic, is available with English subtitles.

The show premiered on September 24, 2006, during Ramadan on Sama Dubai, and has returned with new episodes traditionally debuting every year during Ramadan.

== History ==
FREEJ started off as a six-page study book in 1998, but did not materialise until 2003 when it was adopted by Dubai Media City. A small demo was created to test the concept and shortly after, it was given the official go ahead by the Mohammed bin Rashid Establishment for Young Business Leaders (SME), who took on the initial funding of the project. In September 2005, with around 3 million Dhs of funding provided by the SME, Lammtara Pictures was established to oversee the production and a team of almost 500 people were signed up to make this big dream a reality.

The series premiered on 24 September 2006 – the first day of Ramadan, and was broadcast across the GCC countries on 'Sama Dubai' (Dubai's Sky), one of Dubai's many TV channels, which broadcasts mainly local material. The series was an instant success and a major hit in the region with high viewership in the Gulf especially among UAE Nationals.

In 2007, Dubai One, an English Channel (which is also part of DMI) announced that Freej would still be Arabic in Dubai One but with English subtitles and put two episodes a week before TMZ.

In 2008, Season 2 DVDs were released in September at Toys R Us and other outlets.

In 2010, via a partnership deal with Turner Broadcasting System, Lammtara, the Dubai-based studio company behind Freej's production, had agreed to broadcast the show on the newly launched Cartoon Network Arabic channel, making Freej one of the first home-produced shows for that channel, along with the Jordanian series Ben & Izzy. Additionally, the main characters from Freej were used in a localised version of Skatoony at April 12, 2011.

== Rights ==
The show is now officially associated with Dubai Media City, Awraq Publishing, Arab Radio Network, JBM and the Mohammed bin Rashid Establishment for Young Business Leaders (SME). The show also benefited from a pool of 100 volunteers from across all national universities, who worked on its research and development.

== Development ==
Mohammed Saeed Harib began developing the concept while attending Northeastern University in Boston, Massachusetts. A professor asked his class to create superheroes originating from their culture. Harib selected the Emirati women of previous generations as the heroes, because they worked and taught in difficult climates and financial environments. While the men in his grandfathers' generation dove for pearls, their wives accomplished the other tasks. Harib added "On top of that she looked very unique, thanks to the mask she was wearing. Hence my first character was born."

All four voice actors are Harib's personal friends. They had no previous acting experience, and Harib believed that audiences would accept them since "they were your regular local person." He had held script readings with these friends, and Harib said they matched perfectly. Harib previously held a casting for 60 people, and he said that "none of them spoke to the woman that was in my head."

The production has about 500 employees, with Harib in charge. Harib created all of the main characters. He works with the actors and, with the scriptwriters, develops the scripts. He personally revises the draft scripts.

Freej does not discuss politics. Harib said that the show does not discuss current issues because he wants something that lives, so must use themes which can withstand the passage of time." Harib has said his Dubaian nationality affects his choice of subjects but that the television stations do not force the production to avoid discussing certain subjects.

== Characters ==
The show stars four main characters, all elderly women who wear battoulah, Bedouin face masks. The women's names refer to their eldest sons. "Um" means "mother of". Mohammed Saeed Harib created all of the main characters.

=== Um Saeed ===
Um Saeed (أم سعيد)

- Eldest member of the group and the wisest
- Loves reciting poetry and old traditional sayings
- Has a short posture
- Very sarcastic in nature
- Addicted to coffee
- Shortest member of the group

The group gathers at her house every day.

Majid Al Falasi (ماجد الفلاسي) is the voice actor. This was Mohammed Saeed Harib's first character. "Saeed" was the name of his father, and "Um Saeed" is Harib's homage to his paternal grandmother.

=== Um Saloom ===
Um Saloom (أم سلوم)

- The kindest member of the quartet.
- Never leads and always tags along.

Abdullah Husain (عبدالله حسين) is the voice actor.

=== Um Allawi ===
Um Allawi (أم علاوي)

- The tallest member of the group and the most educated.
- Addicted to all kinds of gizmos and gadgets.
- Has her own mobile and laptop.
- A close follower of the stock market.

Since Um Allawi is of a Persian heritage, she does not have an exact Emirati accent. She speaks multiple languages. Ashjan (أشجان) is the voice actress.

=== Um Khammas ===
Um Khammas (أم خمّاس)

- The rebellious member of the group.
- A three time widow.
- Runs her own catering service and traditional music band.
- Has a very dictating strong personality.

Salem Jassim (سالم جاسم) is the voice actor. Jassim says that he likes Um Khammas because "she is the classic Bedouin character and reminds me of my grandmother."

=== Guest/Others ===
- Khalid Herya (Arabic : خالد حرية) - National Figure known for being the best football supporter in the Middle East
- Um Jameel
- The Tribe Advisor
- Zubaidah
- Rahmah the Teacher
- Bu Daryah
- Um Al Duwais
- Bu Khammas
- Rafeeq
- Dalouat Dubai
- Um Um Khammas
- Agha
- Abood (عبود) (Season 2)
  - Abood is a mischievous little boy. He is Um Saeed's grandchild.
- Fatoom Eloom (Season 3)
- Jameela (جميلة) (Season 3)
  - Jameela is obsessed with fashion.
- Margaret

== Seasons ==
Freej's seasons premier every Ramadan, and are sometimes re-aired later in the year. Season One aired in 2006 and Season Two aired in 2007. On September 1 (Ramadan 1), 2008 the third season aired its finale on September 12, 2008, and re-aired its episodes for the rest of Ramadan. The show then went on a hiatus, not releasing any new official episodes for the next four years, in spite of the characters appearing in other animated productions for promotional reasons.

As of 2024, the sixth season has been announced. The fourth season premiered on Cartoon Network Arabic starting November 4, 2012. The fifth season premiered in 2013.

Mohammed Saeed Harib said, in relation to the first and second seasons, that "it was in my head, I was the only one who could express it." For subsequent seasons, he said "I have a very good team, they know the parameters. We say “Um Saloom would not say that” or “OK, this fits her”."

== Trivia ==
The second season first episode was watched by 680,000 viewers, making it one of the most watched shows in Dubai.

The show was voted number one show of all Dubai.

In the second season, the writer Najla El Shihi wrote six episodes and Amna Al Mansoori wrote nine.

Um Saeed's voice actor, Majid Al Falasi, passed away on May 7, 2023.

== Freej 2009: The Book Of Riddles and The Special ==
On Ramadan 2009 Freej aired a quiz show that was 2–3 minutes long. The prize was 500,000 AED. Freej was to get a special hour-long episode that would air on Eid, featuring a surprise guest.

== Reception ==
The series has received critical acclaim.

The Economist said "the show has gained the region-wide, cross-generational popularity of an Arab "Simpsons"" and "[t]his depiction of raucous and irreverent Arab matriarchs has proved to be a revelation."

Mohammed Saeed Harib said that Freej is popular because there were few quality productions in the Arab world, and because the residents of the Arab world had watched many imported shows and wanted local shows reflecting the Arab culture.

Harib said that his grandmother's generation "love it to bits", noting that they have seen the country evolve from some small village in a desert to a place with the tallest skyscraper in the world. He believes their interest is related to adapting to the new generation.

== Writers ==
The following writers have contributed to this TV show:

- Mohammed Saeed Harib (CEO)
- Amna Al-Mansoori (Novel writer)
- Najla Al-Shehhi (Wrote some episodes)

== Legacy ==
The Flydubai safety video features characters from Freej.
