= Arran Summerhill =

Arran Summerhill is a mortgage industry executive based in the United Arab Emirates. He is the co-founder and chief operating officer of Holo, a Dubai-based digital mortgage brokerage platform.

== Career ==
Summerhill has worked in the mortgage and home-finance industry in the United Kingdom and the United Arab Emirates. In 2024, Entrepreneur Middle East reported that he had more than 18 years of experience in home finance and had spent approximately 15 years working in traditional mortgage brokerage alongside Michael Hunter.

By 2020, Summerhill was a director of Holo, a mortgage brokerage and technology platform operating in the UAE. He co-founded the business with Hunter and subsequently served as its chief operating officer.

Holo launched in 2020 as a digital mortgage platform. According to Summerhill and Hunter, their experience in traditional mortgage brokerage influenced the development of the business.

== Industry commentary ==
Summerhill has been quoted in UAE news publications on mortgage lending, interest rates and property financing. In 2020 and 2021, The National and Gulf News cited his comments on mortgage refinancing and changes in borrowing costs during the COVID-19 pandemic.

In June 2024, The National consulted Summerhill for an article about property affordability in the UAE. He discussed the mortgage pre-approval process and the financial information lenders consider when assessing applications.

In January 2026, Gulf News quoted Summerhill in an article about purchasing property in Saudi Arabia, including the implications of foreign property ownership rules and mortgage financing for prospective buyers.
