= Dubai Towers Dubai =

Dubai Towers Dubai دبي تاورز دبي
- Rendering of the Complex
- Interactive map of the Dubai Towers Dubai دبي تاورز دبي area

General information
- Status: Proposed (vision in 2012)
- Type: Mixed use
- Coordinates: 25°11′37.30″N 55°21′46.68″E
- Construction started: 2027 (design in 2008)
- Estimated completion: TBA

Height
- Height: Tower 1: 550 m (1,800 ft); Tower 2: 464 m (1,522 ft); Tower 3: 408 m (1,339 ft); Tower 4: 368 m (1,207 ft)

Technical details
- Floor count: Tower 1: 97; Tower 2: 78; Tower 3: 74; Tower 4: 63

Design and construction
- Architect: tvsdesign
- Developer: Sama Dubai

Dubai Towers Dubai was a proposed four tower complex in the city of Dubai, United Arab Emirates. It is now cancelled. The developer, Sama Dubai, intended this to form the centrepiece of The Lagoons, a megaproject located on Dubai Creek which was to consist of seven islands. The towers were planned to have between 57 and 94 stories Although the heights are not known, it is believed the tallest would top 400 metres (1,310 ft), two others would rise beyond 300 metres (980 ft), and the fourth tower would rise at 230 m (750 ft). Sama Dubai was the Project Management company in charge of the project. Due to downturn in Dubai, the project was cancelled. As the Complex were not built, The Tower was proposed.

== Design ==
Designed by tvsdesign, these towers were intended to create a dramatic new landmark for Dubai. Their design represents the movement of candlelight and according to Thompson, Ventulett, Stainback & Associates, this is supposed to symbolise hope, harmony, growth and opportunity.

== Construction status ==
The Dubai Towers Dubai, like the rest of The Lagoons, was never built. The developer, Sama Dubai, was forcibly merged into Emaar Properties in 2009 following extensive legal troubles. The masterplan of the area has since changed to accommodate the proposal to build Dubai Creek Tower and the surrounding Dubai Creek Harbour development.

== See also ==
- Dubai Towers Doha
