= List of newspapers in the United Arab Emirates =

The first newspaper in the United Arab Emirates was published in 1970. In 2009 there were 13 daily newspapers in the country.

== Newspapers in the United Arab Emirates ==
=== Arabic ===
- Al Khaleej (Sharjah)
- Akhbar Al Arab (Abu Dhabi)
- Al Bayan (Dubai)
- Al Fajr (Abu Dhabi)
- Al-Ittihad (Al Waseet) (Abu Dhabi)
- Emarat Al Youm (Dubai)

=== English ===
- Gulf News (Dubai)
- Khaleej Times (Dubai)
- 7days (Dubai, published between 2003 and 2016)
- Emirates Business 24/7 (Dubai)
- Gulf Today (Sharjah)
- The National (Abu Dhabi)
- XPRESS (Dubai, published between 2007 and 2018)
- Times of Dubai (Dubai)
- The Arabian Post
- Gulf Latin (International)

=== Malayalam ===
- Gulf Madhyamam Daily (Dubai)
- Middle East Chandrika Daily (Dubai)
- Manorama Daily (Dubai)
- Mathrubhumi Daily (Dubai)
- Siraj Daily (Dubai)

=== Tamil ===
- Daily Thanthi (Dubai)
