= Al-Bayan (newspaper) =

Arabic daily newspaper in the UAE

- Native name: البيان
- Type: Daily newspaper
- Format: Broadsheet
- Owner: Dubai Media Incorporated
- Publisher: Dubai Media Incorporated
- Editor-in-chief: Muna Busamra
- Founded: 10 May 1980; 46 years ago
- Political alignment: Pro-government
- Language: Arabic
- Headquarters: Sheikh Zayed Road, Dubai, United Arab Emirates
- Circulation: 10,000 (2013)
- Sister newspapers: Emarat Al Youm; Emirates 24/7; Dubai Post
- Website: www.albayan.ae

Al-Bayan (Arabic: البيان transl. The Dispatch) is an Arabic language newspaper in the United Arab Emirates which is owned by Government of Dubai. The paper is based in Dubai.

== History ==
Al-Bayan (in Arabic البيان The Dispatch in English) is a daily comprehensive political Arabic language newspaper in the United Arab Emirates. The paper is based in Dubai. It was founded on 10 May 1980. Three daily supplements are issued along on daily basis “Al-Bayan Sports”, “Al-Bayan Economy” and “Five Senses”. Each Saturday a cultural supplement under “Masarat” is issued, another for “Books” is published on Friday in addition to a number of other supplements.

== Editors-in-Chief ==
Muna Busamra is the editor-in-chief of “Al-Bayan”. She has started her career as a journalist in 1998 in “Al Ittihad” newspaper where she stayed for ten years. She has also managed the Localities section in Dubai bureau. In 2008, Busamra joined the Dubai Press Club and contributed with the working team to the development of media projects such as Arab Journalism Award, Arab Media Forum and “an Overview on the Arab Media” annual Report. In 2013 she became the head of Dubai Press Club, where she played a major role in founding the Emirati Media Forum (EMF). In March, on International Women's Day she was appointed the editor-in-chief of “Al-Bayan” newspaper to be the first woman in the position for a daily newspaper. Abu Samra serves as well as the Deputy Chairwoman of UAE Journalists Association, after having presided the Social Security Fund for the UAE Journalists Association; she is a member of the Dubai Women Establishment board of directors, member of the International Federation of Journalists permanent Gender Council. She is an active person in a lot of events and activities related to developing the media sector in general, and journalism in particular.
