= Asharq News =

- Country: Saudi Arabia
- Headquarters: Riyadh, Saudi Arabia

Programming
- Language: Arabic

Ownership
- Owner: Saudi Research and Media Group

History
- Launched: 11 November 2020

Links
- Website: https://asharq.com/en/

Asharq News (Arabic: الشرق للأخبار) is an Arabic-language television Saudi channel and news portal with a focus on regional and global economics. Asharq News was launched on 11 November 2020, and it is a subsidiary of SRMG, the Saudi Research and Media Group.

== Asharq News headquarters ==
Asharq News headquarters is located in Riyadh, and it has central offices in Dubai International Financial Center in the UAE and Washington DC in the US. Also, it has other significant studios in Cairo and Abu Dhabi and offices across key Arab and global cities and capitals. Asharq News has other local offices and journalists in capitals and critical cities across the region and globally. The CEO of Asharq News is Nabeel Al-Khatib, who is an ex-Al Arabiya executive.

== SRMG and Bloomberg ==
Through Asharq Business, SRMG and Bloomberg work together to deliver material to SRMG's news service, Asharq News. The latter is made possible via a deal for exclusive content. Through this agreement, the Asharq Business and Bloomberg teams have access to Bloomberg's analysis and market data, which are heavily focused on finance and the economy. Asharq News is powered by Asharq Business and Bloomberg, whose teams have access to more than 2700 journalists and financial and economic analysts around the world.

In addition, Asharq News includes an Arabic edition of Bloomberg Businessweek magazine.

== Asharq News programs ==
Asharq News airs the following daily programs:

Program's name	Timing	Host	Description
Assabah Maa Cyba (Morning with Cyba)	9:00 am UAE (8:00 am KSA)	Cyba Audi	A business morning show that targets Arab business leaders, exploring news and topics concerning the Asian and American economies and their effects on the region.
Economic Bulletin –First Session	12:30 pm UAE (11:30 am KSA)	Nour Amache	A daily program that provides a breakdown of the most significant economic news in the region and the regional markets' performances for the day.
Economic News –Asharq Indicators	2:30 pm UAE (1:30 pm KSA)	Mohamed Fathy	This program provides insights into some GCC markets' closures and significant developments in European markets.
Aswaaq Al Sharq (Eastern Markets)	3:30 pm UAE (2:30 pm KSA)	Abdullah Al Subaiae	A program dedicated to analyzing the Saudi economic landscape.
Sharq wa Gharb (East and West)	4:00 pm UAE (3:00 pm KSA)	Maya Hojeij	A daily program that showcases overviews of the Arab markets, European economics and the American market.
Al Rabet (The Link)	7:00 pm UAE (6:00 pm KSA)	Makki Helal and Sahar El Mizari	This show explores the most important current political events and developments and how they link to and impact the economy.
Jalsat Al Masa'a (The Evening Session)	8:00 pm UAE (7:00 pm KSA)	Zeina Soufan	A program of economic and business focus. It summarizes economic events, it showcases investment opportunities and success stories of startups.
Alwan Asharq (Colors of the East)	12:00 am UAE (11:00 pm KSA)	Rasha Khatib and Hadil Eleyan	This daily program covers a range of stories each day including technology, economics, health, politics and others.
Da'erat Asharq (East Circle)	10:00 pm UAE (9:00 pm KSA)	Zeina Yazigi	A political talk show of two hours duration that reviews the day's events and then examines them from its ‘five corners'.
Al Ertidad Sharqan (Eastern Rebound)	1:00 am UAE (12:00 am KSA)	Moataz El-Demerdash and Abdullah Al Yahya	The program revolves around examining the most significant worldwide developments taking place every day, and their impacts on the Arab region.

As for Asharq News weekly programs, they are as follows:

Program's name	Timing	Host	Description
Al Madar (The Orbit)	Friday, 3:00 pm UAE (2:00 pm KSA)	Adhwan Alahmari	A broadcast from London that discusses crucial issues in detail with policymakers and opinion leaders.
Ala Al Houdoud (On the Borders)	Friday, 11:00 pm UAE (10:00 pm KSA)	Sahar El Mizari	This program is dedicated to weekly summaries of the most prominent events occurring in the Middle East's neighboring countries and how they impact the Arab world.
Maa wa Doud (With and Against)	Tuesday, 11:00 pm UAE (10:00 pm KSA)	Makki Helal	This program invites two opposing parties to present their opinions, allowing the audience to learn the different dimensions and perspectives of a single issue that interests the public.
Isa'al Bassem (Ask Bassem)	Thursday, 6:30 pm UAE (5:30 pm KSA)	Dr Bassem Yousef	A program with Dr Bassem Youssef specialized in making a healthier life for oneself.

Asharq News also airs monthly programs, which are:

Program's name	Timing	Host	Description
Ba'ad Heen… (After a While)	Monday, 6:00 pm UAE (5:00 pm KSA)	Khadija Rahali	This monthly program keeps track of events that previously dominated the news, and it brings them back to the public eye. It shows those news' current state and impact.
Amam Al Kawalees (In Front of the Scenes)	Friday, 6:00 pm UAE (5:00 pm KSA)	-	Specialized in investigating and analyzing controversial issues.
Ala Naheyah Okhra (On the Other Side)	Friday, 6:30 pm UAE (5:30 pm KSA)	-	Introducing a selection of documentaries with a narrative element.
Yawm Ma'a… (A Day with…)	Monday, 6:00 pm UAE (5:00 pm KSA)	Zeina Soufan	The program offers interactive and dynamic discussions to get to know the top business and finance leaders.

== Bans ==
The channel was banned from broadcasting in Sudan by the country's government from 20 February to 24 March 2025, after it aired a report on proposed amendments to the country’s Constitutional Declaration that were subsequently denied by Information Minister Khalid Aleisir.
