= Emirates Dubai Television =

Television channel

- Country: United Arab Emirates

Programming
- Language: Arabic

History
- Founded: 21 February 1971; 55 years ago
- Closed: 14 June 2004; 22 years ago
- Replaced by: Dubai TV

Emirates Dubai Television was a television channel transmitting terrestrially out of Dubai in Arabic targeting the expat community in the U.A.E. It was founded in 1971, following a service that existed between 9 September 1969 and 1972 funded by Kuwait Television. This initial service broadcast to Dubai, Sharjah and Ajman, with the majority of the content being sourced from Kuwait, as well as local news bulletins. After the launch of Dubai Television, this service shut down in December 1972. Habib Al-Reda was the director of this first service, who was later appointed as assistant undersecretary in the Ministry of Media and Culture in the Northern Emirates up until 2003, when he died.

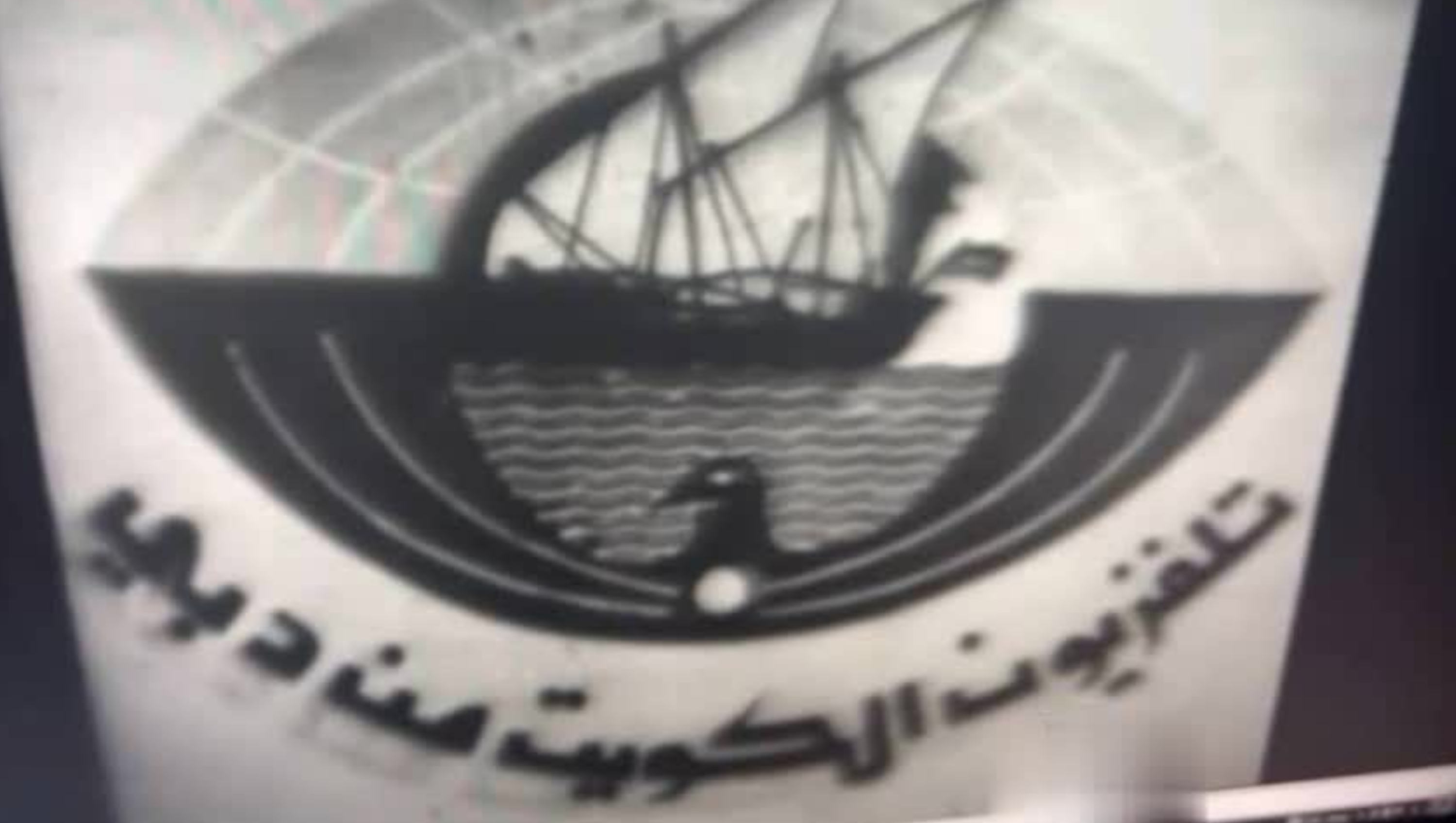
Static slide of Kuwait Television from Dubai (1969–1972)

After these events, the new local service started test broadcasts in colour in 1970, becoming regular on 21 February 1971, broadcasting on VHF channel 2, with an effective radiated power of 25kW, broadcasting from 6pm to 12:30am daily. In 1976, it set up a relay station at Jebel Hatta Mountain on UHF channel 41. The transmitter was built by Marconi. In 1986, EDTV provided programmes for Westminster Cable's Arabic channel in central London.

A memorandum of understanding was signed with Rupert Murdoch's Star TV in 1994, enabling EDTV's international service to be seen in South Asia and Australia, for the Arabian diasporas in these areas. A pay-TV co-operation arrangement between both companies was also in the works.

It started transmitting via satellite in 1995 using the original Hot Bird satellite. In 2004, it changed its identity completely and is now known as Dubai TV and is part of DMI.

The Emirates Dubai Television originally broadcast locally on two frequencies: One which kept the channel's programming open the whole day, whilst the other was adjacently switched in favour of Channel 33's 12-hour English programming beginning at 4:00 pm, later extending to 2:00 pm UAE time.

== See also ==
- Dubai TV
- Dubai 33
