= 7days =

English language newspaper published in the United Arab Emirates

- Type: Daily newspaper
- Owner: Associated Newspapers
- Publisher: Al Sidra Media LLC
- Founded: 7 April 2003
- Ceased publication: 22 December 2016; 9 years ago
- Political alignment: Neutral
- Language: English
- Website: www.7days.ae

7DAYS was an English language free daily newspaper published in the United Arab Emirates owned from 2016 by Lovin Dubai. It was in circulation between 2003 and 22 December 2016.

== History and profile ==
7DAYS was the region's first free daily newspaper. It was part-owned by the UK's Daily Mail General Trust (DMGT). The paper was founded by Ashley Northcote and Steve Lee (not Jaydub ) as a weekly tabloid published every Friday in 2003.

The circulation of the daily, which was confirmed by the BPA, was 62,532 copies for the last six months of 2011. For the first six-month period of 2013 the paper had a circulation of 61,494 copies.

In 2016 it was acquired by Augustus Media owned Lovin Dubai media company.

The paper was known for holding an editorial line independent of the remainder of the country's print media. It was folded on 22 December 2016.

== See also ==
- List of newspapers in the United Arab Emirates
