= Emarat Al Youm =

Arabic-language daily newspaper in Dubai

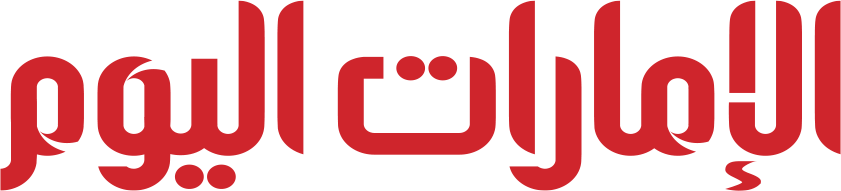
- Native name: الإمارات اليوم
- Type: Daily newspaper
- Format: Tabloid
- Owner: Dubai Media Incorporated
- Publisher: Dubai Media Incorporated
- Managing editor: Abdallah Bani-issa
- Founded: 20 September 2005; 20 years ago
- Political alignment: Pro-government
- Language: Arabic
- Headquarters: Sheikh Zayed Road, Dubai, United Arab Emirates
- Sister newspapers: Al Bayan; Dubai Post; Emirates 24/7
- Website: www.emaratalyoum.com

Emarat Al Youm (Arabic: الإمارات اليوم, romanized: al-Imārāt al-Yawm, lit. 'The Emirates Today') is an Arabic newspaper published by Dubai Media Incorporated in Dubai, United Arab Emirates. The newspaper content focuses on domestic issues and other topics of interest to Arab readers.

== History and profile ==
Emarat Al Youm was first published on 20 September 2005. The owner and publisher of the paper was the Arab Media Group until October 2009 when the Dubai Media Incorporated became both owner and publisher. Sami Al Reyami is the editor-in-chief of the daily. One of its sister papers is Emirates 24/7, an English-language daily.

In July 2009, the Abu Dhabi Federal Court of Appeal closed down the print and online versions of the paper for 20 days and also, fined its editor $5,445 due to the publication of an article in October 2006 which alleged that some of the ruling family's thoroughbred race horses were given steroids. On 26 July 2009, the paper was relaunched.

The paper's online version was the twenty-second most visited website for 2010 in the MENA region.

Emarat Al Youm was given by Dubai Press Club the Political Journalism Award in 2013.

== See also ==
- List of newspapers in the United Arab Emirates
