= Xena (disambiguation) =

Xena is the main character of Xena: Warrior Princess.

Xena may also be used for:

- Xena (software), archiving software
- Xēna or Lisa Fischer, R&B musician
- Xena, a former, informal name that was used for the dwarf planet Eris
- Xena, Saskatchewan, an unincorporated area in Canada
- Xena (genus), a fly genus
- Xena (moth), a name formerly used for the moth genus Netoxena before it was realized that the name had already been used
- Xena (wrestler), Australian professional wrestler
- Xena Wimmenhoeve (born 2000), Dutch wheelchair basketball player

== See also ==
- Zena (disambiguation)
- Xenia (disambiguation)
- Xenu, a figure in Scientology beliefs
