= Dubai 33 =

Television channel in the United Arab Emirates

Dubai Channel 33 (originally branded as Ch33 or Dubai 33) was a national television channel transmitting terrestrially out of Dubai in English, targeting the expat community in the U.A.E. It was founded in 1977. Up until the late 1980s, it was a 12-hour channel, switching broadcasts adjacently from one of Emirates Dubai Television's frequencies starting at 2:00 pm, U.A.E. time, with a children's block, and concluding at 2:00 am. The times of the switch often changed usually during Ramadan, which varied each year. It was the only free-to-air English-language channel in Dubai at the time.

The channel shut down on 23 December 2004, being replaced by a newer service, One TV, which was created to cater to newer audiences.

== History ==
From the late 1990s, its popularity started dwindling due to availability of alternate channels in English as well as the expat communities native languages via growing use of satellite TV and mainstream cable (E-Vision in 2000).

On 1 October 2002, it started transmitting over the satellite using Arabsat and Nilesat initially over a two-month trial period of four hours, and turned into a free-to-air 24-hour channel on 2 December, the national day, even though retaining the children's block timing at 2:00 pm.

In 2004, it changed its identity completely and relaunched as Dubai One (after being known as One TV for a short initial period) and is now part of Dubai Media Incorporated. Dubai One managed to recapture some of the lost expat market due to its more U.S.-based premium programming, even though when it was temporarily known as "One TV", it retained most of Ch33's original programming, including the signature children's block, which was later removed. However, Ch33 had an originality that could never be replaced and is now being copied by other Gulf states expat televisions.

Ch33 originally had a habit of changing the type-face of their logo every few years.

== Programming ==
It originally aired popular US TV shows, UK comedy, horse racing, daily news and every Thursday at 10.00pm, a Hindi movie subtitled in English. Later, its programs became even more diversified to include more soap operas from Australia and Canada.

The Hindi film ceremony Zee Cine Awards was also shown in February 2004, which took place in Dubai.

As with other media in the UAE, all programs on Channel 33 were to be aired after heavy and inconsistent censoring of whatever content was deemed inappropriate by its censor boards. The channel only allowed Islamic shows and no other religious shows were permitted.

Channel 33 had a teletext service called Gulfax. From 1989, the channel relayed pages from the service between 1pm and 4pm on weekdays before regular programming started.

== See also ==
- Dubai One
- Saudi TV Channel 2 - Saudi Arabia's publicly owned English channel which originally featured similar programming (despite poor scheduling and much heavier censorship editing) to Dubai Channel 33 before its own re-branding.
