= Zeina Soufan =

Lebanese journalist and television host

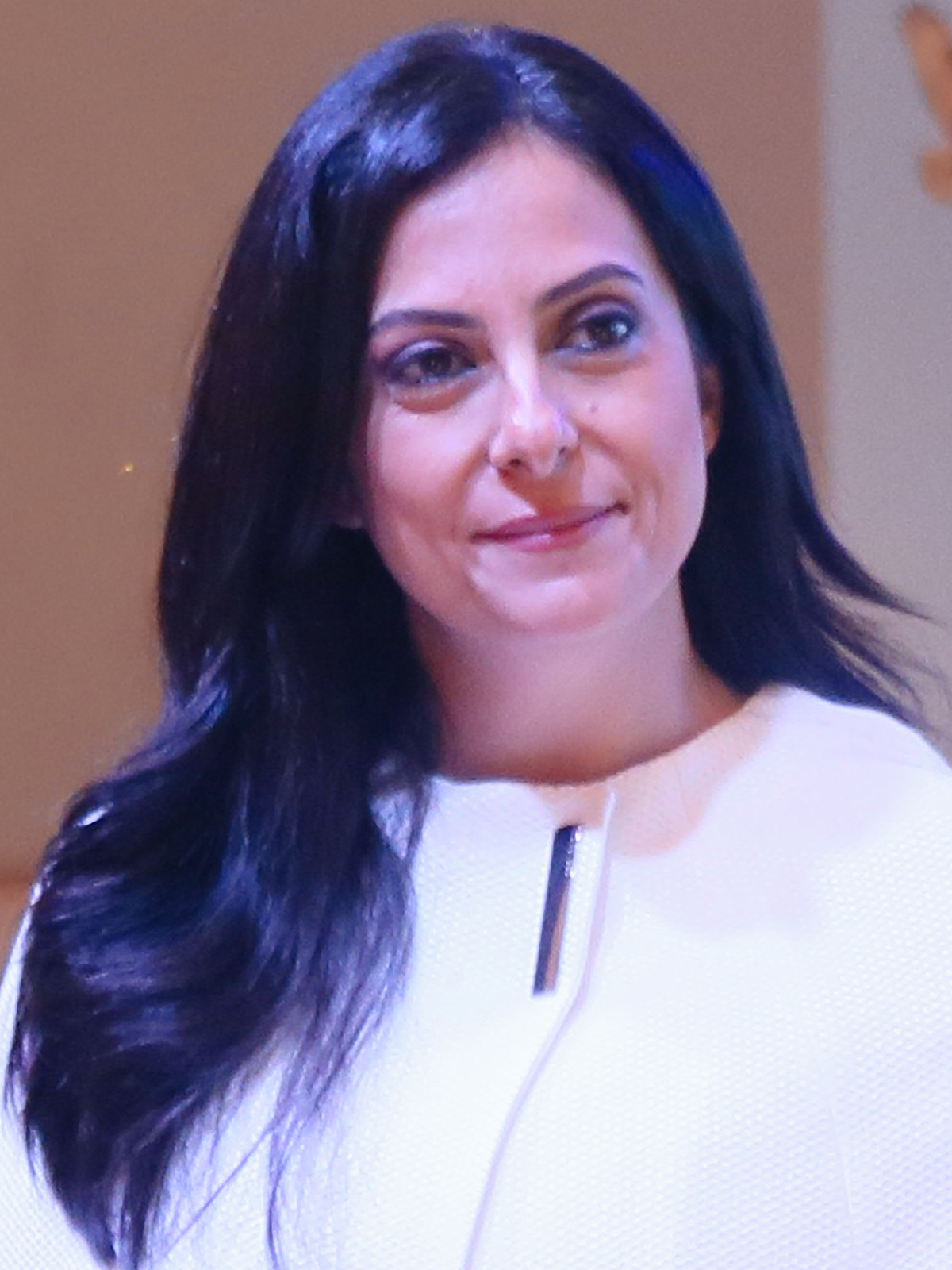
- Born: Saida, Lebanon
- Occupations: Journalist, news presenter, author
- Years active: 1993–present
- Television: Oil and gas, Money Map

Zeina Soufan (Arabic: زينة صوفان) is a Lebanese journalist and television host based in Dubai. Soufan is senior business editor at Dubai Media Incorporated and host of "Money Map" show on Dubai TV. She is also an independent author and digital content creator.

== Personal life ==
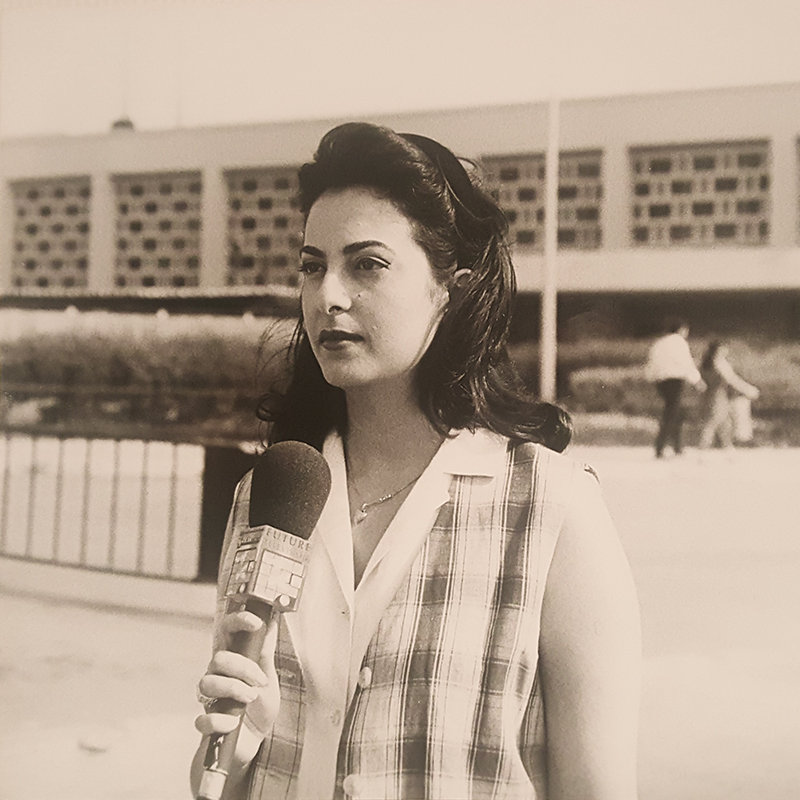
Soufan in 1994

Zeina Soufan was born to a Shia family in Saida, Lebanon. Her family fled the Lebanese Civil War and moved to Saudi Arabia where Zeina finished her school years before moving back to Lebanon briefly and then to Egypt. In February 1993, she graduated with a bachelor's degree in Middle Eastern Studies from the American University in Cairo.

== Career ==
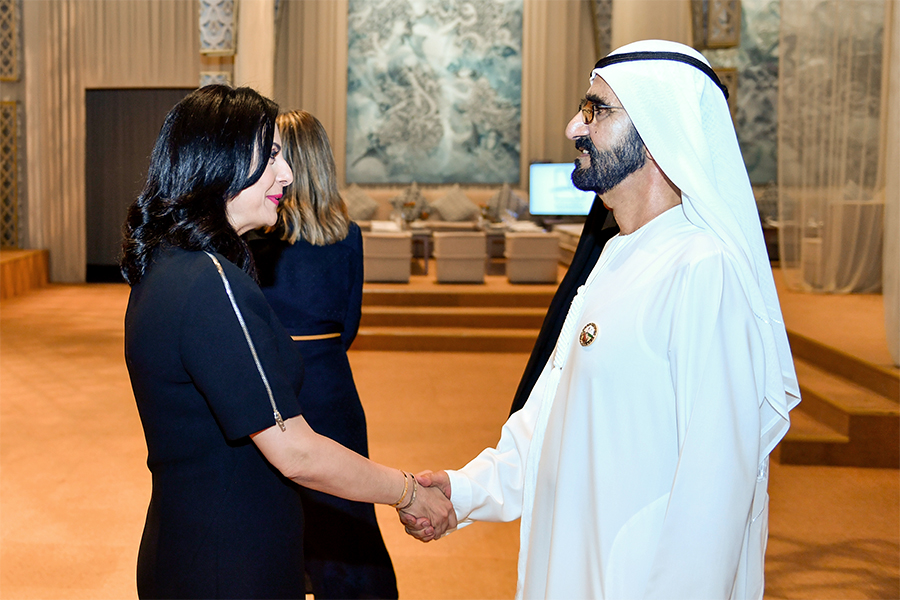
Soufan with Sheikh Mohammed

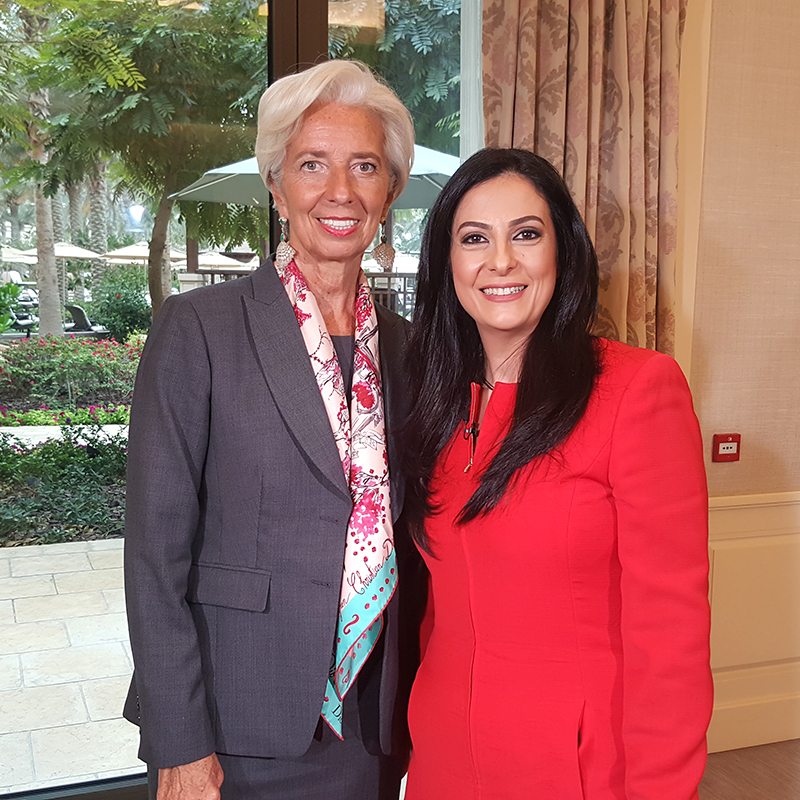
Soufan with Christine Lagarde

Zeina Soufan produced and presented News reports, bulletins and television shows throughout her career. She interviewed public figures, leaders and government Officials and produced hard political and business news in addition to feature stories from around the globe.

She started her career with Lebanese Future Television in 1993 in Beirut before moving to Reuters news agency as a Beirut correspondent in 1995. Among her notable assignments were the field coverage of the 1994 Israeli blitz in south Lebanon dubbed "Operation Accountability" and the 1996 "War of Wrath" during which Israeli forces committed he Qana massacre. In the year 2000, Zeina was among the first journalists to enter south Lebanon hours after Israel withdrew its forces from the occupation zone.

Soufan moved back to television in 1998 to join Dubai Business Channel. In 2004, she joined Al Arabiya and was among the core team that launched the top pan Arab business show "Al Aswaq Al Arabiya". In 2011, she moved to Dubai TV where she still produces and presents the channel's main weekly business show "Money Map".

Zeina Soufan is a public speaker and moderator at high-profile events, including global forums such as The World Economic Forum and the World Government Summit. In 2019, she was chosen to be a jurist in Dubai Smart Government Competition under the patronage of the Crown prince of Dubai Sheikh Hamdan Bin Rashed Al Maktoum.

== Articles ==
Soufan continues to write articles and opinion columns. Her work is published in some of the region's top Newspapers and websites such as Alhayat, Asharq Al-Awsat, Alarabiya Net and Emarat Al Youm.

== Awards ==
In 2016 she won the Best Arab Business Journalist Award in a ceremony held in Amman, Jordan.

== Television ==
Year	Title	Role	Channel
2000–2002	Min Lubnan bil Arqam	Producer, presenter	Dubai Business Channel
2005	Portfolio	Producer	Arabiya Channel
2007–2008	Oil and Gas	Producer, presenter	Arabiya Channel
2010–2011	Biddirham	Producer, presenter	Dubai TV
2013–present	Money Map	Producer, presenter	Dubai TV
