= Zeina Yazigi =

Syrian journalist

- Born: 2 April 1975 (age 50); Latakia, Syria
- Education: Tishreen University; Lebanese American University
- Occupation: Journalist
- Years active: 1996–present
- Spouse: Abed Fahed (m. 2002)
- Children: 2

Zeina Yazigi (Arabic: زينة يازجي) is a Syrian journalist, news agency reporter and television news anchor. She is now a news anchor at Asharq News.

== Career ==
Yazigi was born on 2 April 1975 in Latakia. Her father was a doctor and her mother had studied at the Sorbonne in Paris. Yazigi earned a BA in English Literature from Tishreen University in Latakia, and a degree in media from the Lebanese American University.

She started working for Reuters and then for the Associated Press in its Beirut bureau. Then, she became a reporter for CNBC in Syria. She, later, moved to Syrian Television as a presenter of political programs for a year and a half. She worked as an anchor for Al Arabiya starting from 2003. She presented the weekly political program Tahta Al-Daw (Under the Light) on Al Arabiya. She left Al-Arabiya in 2011 as a result of the Syrian uprising, and joined Dubai TV where she produced and anchored the political talk show The Arab Street. Later on, she moved to Sky News Arabia where she produced and hosted the political talk show Bisaraha ('Frankly'), until 2017.

Yazigi is active in campaigning for refugees and has worked as a consultant for UNHCR.

Yazigi was named one of the 100 Most Powerful Arab Women by Arabian Business magazine in 2013.

In November 2020, Yazigi started working for the newly established Asharq News.

== Personal life ==
She married the Syrian actor Abed Fahed in 2002; they have a daughter and a son.
