= Westminster Cable =

British cable company

Westminster Cable was a British cable company established in 1985 by British Telecom, serving as the cable television franchise for the City of Westminster and the Maida Vale, St. John's Wood and Baker Street areas of central London. It was known at launching time for its implementation of interactive television technologies.

== History ==
In 1983, the government issued licences for eleven cable franchises across the UK. The resuting licences were awarded on 25 November that year; the City of Westminster received a licence from the Westminster Cable Company.

The service became operational in October 1985, but did not start full service until 18 December. In addition to the four terrestrial channels of the time, it offered the early UK cable channels: Thorn-EMI's three channels, Premiere, The Children's Channel and Music Box, The Arts Channel, Sky Channel, Lifestyle, and Screensport. It also offered two foreign channels, Worldnet and French channel TV5, as well as producing The Arabic Channel, with content from Emirates Dubai Television. Programmes started with a reading of the Quran and was followed by a variety of EDTV programmes, the only live programme being the 10pm news bulletin, which was shown live at 6pm UK time. The Arabic Channel was the result of a supply agreement with EDTV. The channel closed within two years because it failed to satisfy EC/EU quota requirements as the UAE is from outside the union.

It also employed the Prestel service to provide text-based information and interactive television services from its launch, as well as a world news and business service supplied by Reuters. Other services involved the ordering of goods and payment using a credit card, the electronic programme guide Screencheck and a food order service.

BT sold off all of its cable television shares in 1990 except for Westminster Cable, who used it as a testing ground for new television technologies, most notably the interactive television service. By 1996, it was implementing an advanced interactive television service, Superstar, developed by BT and was conducting VOD trials.

Eventually, the cable company was sold to CableTel, which later became NTL, and, in 2007, Virgin Media, but BT was still owning the cables. When analogue cable was being phased out, both parties were at a dispute as it and Milton Keynes were forbidden from receiving Virgin Media's newer services. This prompted Virgin Media to pull out of the area from next January.
