= Mohammed Saeed Harib =

Emirati animator (born 1978)

- Born: 1978 (age 47–48); Dubai
- Occupations: Cartoonist and Director

Mohammed Saeed Harib (Arabic: محمد سعيد حارب; born in 1978, in Dubai) is an animator from the United Arab Emirates, accredited as the creator and producer of FREEJ; an animated UAE cartoon series. Harib is a Northeastern University graduate, majoring in General Arts and Animation, and holds the distinction as the first 3D cartoon animator from the Middle East.

Harib recently directed FREEJ FOLKLORE, the largest Arabic theatrical production in the region. FREEJ FOLKLORE marks a new era in the entertainment industry through Harib’s introduction of innovative approach that combined magnificent art with highly sophisticated technical tools. The show is set to tour the region after the great success it saw in the United Arab Emirates.

== Family ==
Mohammed Saeed Harib is the son of Saeed Harib, the Managing Director of Dubai International Marine Sports (DIMC), and the Chairman of the World Professional Powerboat Association (WPPA). Harib’s mother died when he was a child. Harib’s sister is Shamsa Harib who also works in the media industry.

== Education & Career ==
At the beginning, Harib was studying architecture in Northeastern University in Boston because it was a common desire between him and his father. Harib failed his first year and that led him to explore other majors. After taking few courses in Arts and getting good marks in them, Harib decided to change his major to General Arts and Animation. Harib’s father did not mind this change, even though Animation back then was not a well-established field in the Middle East. According to Harib, "animation was considered taboo in my culture when I first studied it. However my father was an open-minded person and he used to say: 'Study what makes you happy'”.

FREEJ characters were part of Harib’s sketch book since 1998. These characters became famous cartoon characters when Harib finished his studies and went back to his home country; UAE. The CEO of Dubai Media City engorged Harib to explore ways that can turn these sketches into reality presented in a cartoon show. It was challenging because the Animation industry did not exist in UAE and the project required financial support. According to Harib, “Not only did I have to find backing to fund it, I had to persuade people here that it was something that could work".

Harib offered his project to Sheikh Mohammed bin Rashid Establishment for Young Business Leaders Organization to get financial support. It took 3–4 years until the offer got accepted, because it was considered as a risky investment. In 2005, Harib established Lammtara Pictures and FREEJ was the first project of this company. Harib worked with 500 people in two different countries on this project. The first episode of FREEJ was presented in 2006 and gained popularity that is compared to the popularity of The Simpsons. The show continued for the next two years and it received important awards and high ranks.

Harib contributions were not limited to the Animation Field. Harib was the host of a photography show called Akes. Harib also created few logos for Dubai city, the most famous one is the logo of Dubai International Film Festival. Besides that, Harib directed FREEJ FOLKLORE, ‘the largest Arabic theatrical production in the region, which talks about history, culture and traditions’. Recently, Harib has been working on filming an animated documentary called Al Naby (The Prophet) with Roger Allers; the director of The Lion King, and Salma Hayek.

== Awards ==
Harib won a number of important awards until this day like Majid Bin Mohammed Youth Media Award in 2011 and the Muhr Award for the category of best Emirati talent in 2007, in the International Dubai Festival. Also Harib won the title of “Young CEO of the Year” from the CEO Middle East magazine in 2008, and the “World’s Most Influential Arabs” from the Arabian Business magazine from 2008 to 2012.
