= Zina (disambiguation) =

Zina (الزنا) is the term for unlawful sexual intercourse in Islam.

Zina may also refer to:

- Zina (given name)
- Peggy Zina (born 1975), Greek singer-songwriter
- "Zina" (song), a 2012 song by Babylone
- The Yelang, a historical political entity and tribal alliance in what is now south-west China
- Zina, a town in Logone-et-Chari, Far-North, Cameroon
- Zina (film), a 1985 film

== See also ==
- Ziina, a financial services company based in the United Arab Emirates
