= Akhbar Al Arab =

Akhbar Al Arab أخبار العرب
- Type: Daily newspaper
- Publisher: Akhbar Al Arab Company
- Editor: Ahmad Rateb Al Kheshen
- Founded: 2000; 25 years ago
- Language: Arabic
- Headquarters: Abu Dhabi
- Circulation: 35,000 (as of 2003)

Akhbar Al Arab (in Arabic أخبار العرب meaning The News of the Arabs in English) is a daily newspaper published in Abu Dhabi.

== History and profile ==
Akhbar Al Arab published by Al Wathba Publishing was founded in 1999. Ahmad Rateb Al Kheshen is the editor-in-chief of the daily.

The estimated circulation of the paper in 2003 was 35,000, making it the third in the country. Its 2008 circulation was 20.000 copies.

== See also ==
- List of newspapers in the United Arab Emirates
