= Shaabiat Al Cartoon =

- شعبية الكرتون
- Genre: Satire Animation Sitcom
- Created by: Amer Koukh (Season 1 – 5); Haidar Mohammed (Season 6 – 18)
- Country of origin: United Arab Emirates
- No. of seasons: 18
- No. of episodes: 347

Original release
- Network: Sama Dubai
- Release: 23 September 2006 – 1 March 2025

Shaabiat Al Cartoon (transl. Cartoon Neighbourhood) (Arabic: شعبية الكرتون) was an Emirati animated comedy series and sitcom that revolved around social and cultural values in Emirati society. It was first broadcast on television in 2006 during Ramadan on the channel Sama Dubai. As of Ramadan 2025, Shaabiat Al Cartoon has been cancelled. The show was directed by Amer Kokh from 2006 to 2010, after which Haidar Mohammed took over as director in 2011.

Shaabiat Al Cartoon originally began as a mobile phone animation service in November 11, 2004 and quickly turned into a popular animated show in Persian Gulf region 2006 during the month of Ramadan. It discussed various social issues series faced by groups of Arab families and individuals living in Dubai, their lives and traditions in a humorous way.

Shaabiat Al Cartoon is produced by Fanar Production (formerly Qanawat, 2006–2010), and is sponsored by Etisalat. The show had undergone several changes from 2D to 3D and vice versa, and it ended as 2D. The series has been compared to The Simpsons and South Park.

The English-language version (with English subtitles) is already in production and is intended to reach a broader international audience.

== Series overview ==
| Season | Episodes | Originally released | |
| Season | Episodes | First released | Last released |
|---|---|---|---|
| 1 | 30 | September 23, 2006 | October 23, 2006 |
| 2 | 30 | September 13, 2007 | October 13, 2007 |
| 3 | 30 | September 1, 2008 | September 30, 2008 |
| 4 | 29 | August 22, 2009 | September 19, 2009 |
| 5 | 27 | August 12, 2010 | September 7, 2010 |
| 6 | 26 | August 1, 2011 | August 26, 2011 |
| 7 | 25 | July 20, 2012 | August 14, 2012 |
| 8 | 15 | July 10, 2013 | July 24, 2013 |
| 9 | 15 | June 28, 2014 | July 12, 2014 |
| 10 | 15 | June 18, 2015 | July 2, 2015 |
| 11 | 15 | June 6, 2016 | June 20, 2016 |
| 12 | 15 | May 27, 2017 | June 10, 2017 |
| 13 | 15 | May 6, 2019 | May 20, 2019 |
| 14 | 18 | April 24, 2020 | May 22, 2020 |
| 15 | 15 | April 13, 2021 | April 28, 2021 |
| 16 | 10 | April 2, 2022 | April 11, 2022 |
| 17 | 15 | March 23, 2023 | April 6, 2023 |
| 18 | 15 | March 11, 2024 | April 25, 2024 |
