= Zenas =

Zenas may refer to:

== People with the given name ==
- Zenas (Ζηνᾶς), an ancient Greek sculptor
- Zenas Beach (1825–1898), American politician
- Zenas Bliss (1835–1900), officer and general in the United States Army, recipient of the Medal of Honor
- Zenas Coffin (1764–1828), American mariner and one of the wealthiest whale oil merchants and largest shipowners of his time in Nantucket, Massachusetts
- Zenas Ferry Moody (1832–1917), the seventh Governor of Oregon from 1882 to 1887
- Zenas H. Gurley, Sr. (1801–1871), leader in the Latter Day Saint movement
- Rufus Zenas Johnston (1874–1959), awarded the Medal of Honor for actions at the U.S. occupation of Veracruz, 1914
- Zenas King (born 1818), bridge-builder, founder of the King Iron Bridge & Manufacturing Company in 1871
- Zenas Winsor McCay (c. 1867–1934), cartoonist and animator
- Zenas the Lawyer, one of the Seventy Disciples sent out by Jesus of Nazareth to spread his message

== Places ==
- Zenas, Indiana, unincorporated community in Columbia Township, Jennings County, Indiana, United States
