= Dubai TV =

Television channel

- Logo of the channel
- Country: United Arab Emirates
- Broadcast area: Worldwide
- Headquarters: Dubai, United Arab Emirates

Programming
- Languages: Arabic, English
- Picture format: 1080p, 16:9 HDTV, MPEG-4

Ownership
- Owner: Dubai Media Incorporated

History
- Launched: 14 June 2004; 22 years ago

Links
- Website: www.dubaitv.ae

Dubai TV is an Emirati TV channel offered by the Dubai Media Incorporated (DMI). It replaced Emirates Dubai Television on 14 June 2004. Dubai TV broadcasts programmes predominantly in Arabic. The programming caters to family Arab audience specifically in the Arab world and is also available in Middle East and North Africa , Australia, Europe and the rest of Asia. A majority of its programming is produced locally in Dubai Media City. Dubai TV is a part of a four channel network owned by DMI. High-definition "HD" format is free and available on Nilesat, AsiaSat 5, Arabsat and Hotbird 13G.

== Current programming ==
News and current affairs (Developed by Dubai News Center)

- Madārāt (Danger)
- Al Akhbar Al Emarat (Emirates News)- A Late night Flagship Newscast currently aired on Dubai TV, Sama Dubai TV and Noor Dubai TV.
- Qabil Lailnaqash (Debate)
- Kharitat Al Maal (Economic Update)
- Dubai Hadza Al Sabah (Dubai This Morning)- Morning Program
- The Insider- A Showbiz News Program that gives news and happenings in local and international artist.
- Al-Akhbar (The News)- is a two editioned newscast that gives news and information around the world in Arabic. These newscast has two editions- Midday (Mixed Local and International News) and Evening (International News).

=== Animated series ===
- Freej
- Shaabiat Al Cartoon

=== Soap operas ===
- The Golden Girls
- Mi familia perfecta

=== Reality and game shows ===
- Carpool Karaoke
- Dubai Cruise
- Chopped (Arabic version)
- The Doctors (Arabic version)
- Who Wants to Be a Millionaire? (Arabic version)

== Former programming ==
=== Animated shows ===
- Freej (2006–2020)

=== Reality and game shows ===
- Arabic version of Family Feud
- Arabic version of Fashion Star
- Arabic version of Mental Samurai (2020)
- Arabic version of Millionaire Hot Seat (2013)
- Arabic version of The Cube (2014)
- Arabic version of The Insider

== Channel Frequency ==
- Eutelsat 7 West A 12418 H 30000 3/4 HD (MENA Only)
- Badr 8 12130 V 30000 3/4 HD (EMENA Only)
- AsiaSat 5 4040 H 29720 5/6 HD (Asia-Pacific) (LEFT THE FREQUENCY)
- Hotbird 13G 12399 H 29700 2/3 HD (LEFT THE FREQUENCY)
