= Emirates 24/7 =

Emirati media outlet

Emirates 24/7, stylised as Emirates 24|7, is a Dubai Media Incorporated news website and television news programme, respectively. The televised news programme, Emirates 24/7, is a 30-minute segment broadcast weekly on Dubai Media Inc.'s television channel Dubai One, presenting news and business stories of the week and UAE viewers' reactions.

== Website ==
The Emirates 24/7 web site evolved from the newspapers Emirates Today and Emirates Business24/7 and as of 2011 is led by Riyad Mickdady, Editor-in-Chief.

== TV programme ==
The programme Emirates 24/7 was launched in early 2010, originally hosted by Rebecca McLaughlin. Katie Jensen became the programme's Presenter in November 2010. In its first season, Emirates 24/7 interviewed guests, including Sheikh Ahmed bin Saeed Al Maktoum, the CEO of the Emirates airline; Fatima Al Jaber of Al Jaber Group; John Lipsky of the IMF; Guy Warrington, the British Consul-General to the UAE; and Colin Firth, a Hollywood actor.

Emirates 24/7 was relaunched for its second season on 18 January 2011, becoming a weekly one-hour programme covering news, current affairs, business, sport and entertainment. Its slogan was "People, culture, trends, ideas, lifestyle: if it makes a difference to your life, Emirates 24/7 will tell you why."

The programme is presented by Katie Jensen and former World of Sports presenter Omar Butti. Additional reports are provided by Priyanka Dutt. It is filmed at Dubai Media Incorporated’s studios.
