= Al-Ittihad (Emirati newspaper) =

Newspaper

Al-Ittihad الإتحاد
- Type: Daily newspaper
- Publisher: Al Ittihad Press and Publishing Corporation
- Founded: 20 October 1969; 56 years ago
- Language: Arabic
- Headquarters: Abu Dhabi
- Circulation: 109,640 (2013)
- Sister newspapers: The National
- Website: Al Ittihad

Al-Ittihad (Arabic: الإتحاد, lit. 'The Union') is an Arabic language newspaper published daily in the United Arab Emirates. It is part of the Abu Dhabi Media group, a state-owned organization. The paper is the first regular publication of the country.

== History and profile ==
Al-Ittihad was launched as a 12-page weekly publication with a distribution of 5,500 copies. It started as a weekly publication as there was no local printing press and the papers were produced in Beirut and shipped. It was distributed free local newspaper to stand in the face of competition from newspapers, mainly from other Arab countries. The first issue of Al Ittihad appeared on 20 October 1969. The publisher is Al Ittihad Press and Publishing Corporation which also publishes English daily the National.

The estimated circulation of the daily in 2003 was 58,000 copies, making it the second after Al Khaleej in the country. Its 2006 circulation was 94,275 copies, while it was 76,000 in 2008. The Ipsos data in 2009 showed that the paper had a readership of 59.3%. The paper's online version was the 24th most visited website for 2010 in the MENA region. The circulation of the daily during the first half of 2013 was 109,640 copies.

== Website ==
The newspaper entered the world of Internet on Friday, March 15, 1996, to provide its readers with a new service, thus becoming the first local newspaper to provide this service.

== See also ==
- List of newspapers in the United Arab Emirates
