= Fatima Al Jaber =

Emirati business executive (born 1965)

Fatima Obaid Al Jaber (Arabic: فاطمة عبيد الجابر) (born 1965) is the chief operating officer of the United Arab Emirates-based Al Jaber Group. The conglomerate was established by her father, Obaid Al Jaber. Prior to her appointment as COO, she held a career in the Abu Dhabi Municipality public works department. She became the first Emirati woman to be elected to the Abu Dhabi Chamber of Commerce board of directors in December 2009. She is a member of the board of directors of the Arab Gulf States Institute in Washington. As of 2014, she is listed as the 94th most powerful woman in the world by Forbes.

She also started out training as an engineer.
