= The National (Abu Dhabi) =

UAE newspaper

- Front page of The National on 27 June 2018
- Type: Daily newspaper
- Format: Broadsheet
- Owner: International Media Investments (IMI)
- Editor-in-chief: Mina Al-Oraibi
- Deputy editor: Daniel Gledhill
- Managing editor: Laura Koot
- Staff writers: More than 120
- Founded: 17 April 2008; 18 years ago
- Political alignment: Pro-government
- Language: English
- Headquarters: Abu Dhabi
- Circulation: Unaudited
- Website: thenationalnews.com

The National is a UAE state-owned English-language daily newspaper published in Abu Dhabi, United Arab Emirates.

According to the Financial Times, the newspaper "is seen as a mouthpiece for Abu Dhabi's worldview." The newspaper toes the government line and self-censors on issues considered objectionable by the government. The newspaper is owned by Sheikh Mansour bin Zayed Al Nahyan, Vice President of the United Arab Emirates, which is ruled by his brother, Mohammed bin Zayed Al Nahyan.

== History and profile ==
The National was first published on 17 April 2008 by Abu Dhabi Media. The government-owned media company ran the newspaper along with other publications, including Al-Ittihad, Majid, Zahrat Al Khaleej and National Geographic Al Arabiya (in partnership with National Geographic). In 2016, The National was acquired by International Media Investments, a subsidiary of the Abu Dhabi Media Investment Corporation, a private investment company owned by Mansour bin Zayed Al Nahyan that is also part-owner of Sky News Arabia. Under new ownership, The National was relaunched in July 2017, a move marked by relocation to new headquarters and the opening of a foreign bureau in London. The National has had three previous editors-in-chief: Mohammed Al Otaiba served from February 2014 to October 2016; Hassan Fattah from June 2009 to October 2013; and Martin Newland, who was the launch editor, from April 2008 until June 2009.

With its pledge to follow widely accepted journalism standards and to "help society evolve", The National claims to be an anomaly in the Middle East, where most media outlets are tightly controlled by the government. However, a major goal in establishing the paper was to have respect from the international community on the part of the government.

During the initial launch The National built its staff levels up to 200, recruiting from newspapers around the world, including The Wall Street Journal, The New York Times and The Daily Telegraph of Britain. Martin Newland was editor of The Daily Telegraph from 2003 to 2005, and he took with him many former Telegraph employees, such as Colin Randall (former Telegraph executive news editor), Sue Ryan (former managing editor) and senior photographer Stephen Lock (who covered domestic and foreign news and the international fashion circuit during 20 years on The Daily Telegraph).

In 2008, the circulation of the newspaper was 60,000 copies.

== Content ==
The paper is a single selection organised into five daily sections (News, Business, Opinion, Arts & Lifestyle and Sport) and a Weekend edition which comes out every Friday. It covers local and international news, business, sports, arts and life, travel and motoring. In addition, The National publishes two magazines: Ultratravel (quarterly) and Luxury (monthly). The target group of the paper can be described as 25 and above, educated, affluent, business leaders, decision makers, and key influencers.

== Reception ==
In a 2012 article in the American Journalism Review, former foreign desk editor Tom O'Hara contended that coverage was skewed to favor the agenda of the government of the United Arab Emirates. He said that the newspaper had a "meticulous censorship process" that directly influenced coverage and word usage in the newspaper, such as prohibiting use of the term "Persian Gulf". He said that the newspaper engaged in self-censorship, suppressing coverage of subjects deemed to cast an unfavorable light on the UAE royal family and government. He said that, among other things, coverage of the Libyan uprising was suppressed, as were articles about WikiLeaks and gay rights.

The New Republic reported in February 2013 that The National had failed to live up to high expectations that had been raised when it was established. The magazine said that the newsroom has had a series of crises during the preceding five years, and that "tensions over the management and direction of the paper have been simmering behind the scenes, with leadership changes, budget cuts, infighting and allegations of rampant self-censorship conspiring to trigger a series of defections that have depleted the paper of much of its marquee talent". The article described examples of rampant self-censorship, and said the newspaper's story was "a cautionary tale about pursuing journalism in a censored society".

== See also ==
- List of newspapers in the United Arab Emirates
