= Sama Dubai =

- Type: Subsidiary
- Industry: Real estate, hospitality
- Founded: Dubai (2006)
- Headquarters: Dubai, United Arab Emirates
- Area served: MENA (currently)
- Key people: Farhan Faraidooni (Executive Chairman)

Sama Dubai (Arabic: سما دبي) was an Emirati real estate company noted for its legal troubles, including arrests of senior management, during its brief existence.

== History ==
Sama Dubai was founded in 2006 as a member company and subsidiary of Dubai Holding, a holding company set up by the government of Dubai. Sama Dubai was created as a company with wider responsibility and mandate than its predecessor, Dubai International Properties. Sama Dubai is practically the international property arm of Dubai Holding. It develop real estates and properties in numerous countries, globally.

A number of legal issues arose, predominantly related to Sama Dubai's main project in Dubai. The best known of these is the arrest of four senior members of management, including CEO Abdulsalam Almarri, as part of the cleanup of the Dubai property market.

Other disputes relate to Sama Dubai's blocking of transactions, pending irregular payments and statements from the company that it is not bound by investor protection laws, such as the escrow law.

It was announced in the summer of 2009 that Sama Dubai would be merged into Emaar Properties, along with Dubai Properties and Tatweer.

== Portfolio ==
Sama Dubai develop real estate and property megaprojects in various countries. However, most of these projects have been suspended indefinitely. These originally included projects such as:

- Dubai Towers - A series of supertall, mixed-use skyscrapers being developed in three countries that will contain residential, business, office and entertainment sections.
  - Dubai Towers Casablanca in Casablanca, Morocco – this project has been suspended indefinitely.
  - Dubai Towers Doha in Doha, Qatar – this project has been put on hold due to the financial crash in Dubai.
  - Dubai Towers Istanbul in Istanbul, Turkey – this project has been cancelled.
  - Dubai Towers Dubai in Dubai, UAE – this project has been suspended indefinitely in favor of The Tower.
  - Dubai Towers Jeddah in Jeddah, Saudi Arabia - this project has been suspended indefinitely.
- Salam Resort & Spa – a resort and spa hospitality chain launched by Sama Dubai
  - Salam Yiti – in Yiti, Oman; a AED3 billion project consisting of 2.6 million square meter resort with 18-hole golf course, luxury hotel, marina and eco-centre
  - Salam Bahrain – in Bahrain
- Amwaj – Another real estate development in Rabat, Morocco to create a waterfront city in 100 hectares featuring buildings in classical Mediterranean and Moorish architecture
- Century City & Mediterranean Gate – A luxury real estate investment on the Lac du Sud of the Tunisian capital Tunis. This project covers an area of 830 hectares and will comprise the construction of a new city with skyscrapers, hotels, residential complexes, cultural and leisure complexes, a marina and shopping malls. The costs for this project are estimated at $14bn. The construction works have already commenced in August 2007, the completion of the project will take about 15 years. The first phase was scheduled for completion in 2012.

Much of this portfolio is now thought to be on hold.
