= Dubai Media Incorporated =

Media organization

Dubai Media Incorporated (DMI)
- Type: Television, Radio, Print & Online Media
- Country: United Arab Emirates
- Availability: Middle East and North Africa
- Owner: Dubai
- Key people: Maktoum bin Mohammed bin Rashid Al Maktoum (Chairman); Ahmad Abdalla Al Shaikh (Board Member & Managing Director)
- Former names: Dubai Department of Media
- Official website: dmi.gov.ae (EN) dmi.gov.ae (AR)

Dubai Media Incorporated (DMI) is the official media organization of the government of Dubai. It was established in 2003 as a state-owned company comprising a number of print, radio and TV channels under its umbrella, including: Dubai TV, Al Bayan, Dubai One, Dubai Sports, Emirates 24/7, Tawseel and Masar Printing Press. The chairman of the board of directors of DMI, Maktoum bin Mohammed bin Rashid Al Maktoum, is also the deputy ruler of Dubai.

== History ==
Before DMI was established, the government-owned media outlets were a part of the Dubai Department of Media. These included a number of TV channels which were launched, and closed, over many years prior to the establishment of DMI. These included Dubai TV, Dubai 33, Dubai Business Channel, Al Bayan Newspaper, Dubai 92 and Dubai FM.

After the establishment of Arab Media Group (AMG) in 2005, which is a part of TECOM Investments, the technology and media holdings management arm of Dubai Holding, all of the radio stations and newspapers were transferred under AMG, leaving DMI with only four TV channels (Dubai TV, Sama Dubai, Dubai One and Dubai Sports) and began privatizing the media outlets of Dubai.

=== 2003 channel structure ===
Soon after DMI was established, and with a renewed concentration on television, the organization began relaunching the TV channels as part of a new strategy to target wider audiences, to compete on a pan-Arab level like MBC Group and to complement the ongoing developments of Dubai as a global tourism and investment hub. This included relaunching Dubai TV as a general entertainment and news channel targeting the Arab world, the launch of Sama Dubai as local news and entertainment channel targeting Emirati and Gulf nationals. DMI also replaced the dated Channel 33 and relaunched it as Dubai One, with subtitled Western content targeting Arabs and expatriates living in Dubai and around the Arab world.

=== 2004- The Launching of Dubai News Center ===
As a part of changes, Dubai TV launched and opens a new news center that will used for broadcasting news. Dubai News Center is the current news division of Dubai Media Inc. Developing news bulletins for DMI's Television Channels: Dubai TV, Sama Dubai TV, Noor Dubai TV, Dubai Sports, Dubai Racing, and Dubai One.

=== 2009 AMG-DMI merger ===
As a direct impact of the Great Recession, after considerable layoffs of the workforce, Arab Media Group's newly established Noor Dubai TV (and Radio), along with the print media and publishing outlets were merged with Dubai Media Incorporated in late 2009. This expanded DMI's ownership into radio, print and online media which made it one of the largest media companies in the Middle East. The company also benefited from the newly transferred employees from AMG with their expertise in radio and for-profit media.

=== 2010 expansion ===
With the platform of Noor Dubai radio, DMI launched Dubai FM in September 2011 to target Emirati youth with a variety of news programs and talk shows. There are also plans to launch a magazine called ARA Dubai.

On 23 April 2015, the Dubai Media Incorporated was rebranded as Dubai Channels Network.

On 22 May 2017, the Dubai Channels Network reverted its name back to Dubai Media Incorporated.

== TV Channels ==
DMI has a number of TV channels, some of which extend into multiple broadcasts (Like Dubai Sports 1, 2HD, 3HD, 4HD & 5HD). While most of the production is centralized at DMI's own studios, each channel has its own management, team, structure and strategy.

=== Dubai TV ===
Dubai TV replaced Emirates Dubai Television in June 2004. Dubai TV broadcasts programmes predominantly in Arabic, with some additional Arabic movies and documentary series. The programming caters to family Arab audiences around the MENA region and is also available in Australia, Europe, North America and the rest of Asia. A majority of its programming is produced locally, either through DMI's own in-house productions or by commissioning various production houses throughout the Arab world, whereby DMI acts as the "executive producer". The channel has cosmopolitan shows along with conservative religious programming as well as international formats to cater to the various types of people in the Arab world.

Official Site: مؤسسة دبي للإعلام

=== Sama Dubai ===
Sama Dubai was launched on 20 June 2005 to cater to the Emirati and Gulf audience, with a deep concentration on traditions and culture, specifically targeting the youth of the region. The popularity of the channel is attributed to its view on Gulf culture, while maintaining authenticity in the old traditions, there is always a foreword thinking view through the empowerment of women and the modernization of old culture, specifically with the highly successful reality series Al Meydan, which took the traditional yowlah dancing (which was not widely known at the time) and created competition similar to the format American Idol whereby viewers can vote on the best dancers.

Official Site: مؤسسة دبي للإعلام - قناة دبي

=== Dubai One ===
Dubai 33 (also called "Channel 33") was originally a terrestrial Analog television channel which catered, mostly, to the expatriate community living in Dubai. Through a number of Western cartoons, series, soap operas and films, as well as weekly Hindi cinema along with a nightly local news broadcast. Since the expansion of pay TV networks like Showtime Arabia along with Free-to-air channels like MBC 2 which provided newer Western content, the popularity of Channel 33 declined heavily.

In 2004, DMI launched One TV (which later became Dubai One) as a 24-hour free-to-air Digital satellite channel targeting a pan-Arab audience interested in Western content, this was done by subtitling content in Arabic and creating mostly Arabic and English (with an Arabic accent) on-air promotions. The channel did not include any of the previous content like soap operas, Bollywood cinema or local news. The channel was intended to compete with MBC Group's MBC 2, which was a considerably successful strategy, until MBC launched a number of other Western-content channels, with newer films and TV series than Dubai One.

Since the channel was launched, many of the labouring class expatriates living in Dubai were disappointed with removal of some of their most popular shows including The Bold and the Beautiful and American Idol and the local news broadcast in English (which was, at the time, the only one of its kind in the UAE). The complaints were done through directly contacting DMI along with letters featured in local newspapers like Gulf News.

Due to these shifts in market share, audience requests, as well as the Dubai government's strategy to make the channel promote the events and developments of the city, a daily news program called Emirates News was launched in 2007. The program was similar to the old format local news of Channel 33, but it was based in DMI's State of the art News Center in Dubai Media City which was also used for Dubai TV's and Sama Dubai's news broadcasts (as well as Dubai Sports' news as of the 2010 relaunch), the program managed to successfully produce local news by sharing resources and news content with the other channels.

Dubai One soon began launching more locally produced programs like Out & About, Studio One, World of Sports, Understanding Islam and Emirates 24/7 which was co-branded with the online news website. The channel also brought back The Bold and the Beautiful and began featuring more Hindi cinema along with its Western content, which became more targeted to offer films and TV shows that were not available on competing free-to-air channels.

==== Emirates 24/7 ====
Emirates 24/7 is a 30-minute segment broadcast weekly, as well as the name of their news website.

=== Noor Dubai ===
In 2008, AMG launched Noor Dubai TV on the first day of Ramadan that year, solidifying its Islamic views. The channel was originally an experimental radio and television hybrid, with a limited budget, significantly lower production values than competing Dubai-owned channels and with dual-broadcasts of radio programs on television along with new television-only shows. While the radio station was only available in Dubai, the TV channel was a pan-Arab satellite broadcast, so its popularity grew far beyond the intended audience with a significant following of conservative Muslims living around the Middle East due to the heavy Islamic content, which was based on the radio station format.

After the 2009 AMG-DMI merger, the new channel, along with the radio station, joined DMI and the offices and studios were moved from Dubai Studio City to DMI's headquarters next to Al Maktoum Bridge. DMI relaunched the TV channel in an attempt to separate it from the radio channel and to suppress the ultra-conservative brand. The new target audience was similar to Sama Dubai's Emirati and Gulf target, but instead was an older audience. This was done through programming about cultural and traditional topics as well as a re-broadcasting of decades-old series and programs from the DMI library. DMI also gave Noor Dubai its own broadcast of Emirates news, from DMI's News Center using the same news content that's broadcast on Sama Dubai and Dubai TV's Emirates news.

=== Dubai Sports ===
Dubai Sports Channel was launched in 1998 to cover local sports events in the UAE and to have exclusive Middle East broadcast rights for some of Dubai's sports events like the Dubai World Cup. It was later expanded to include international sports by acquiring Middle East broadcast rights for events like the Olympic Games and Wimbledon Championships.

The popularity of the channel grew as it increased coverage of the UAE Football League, with live broadcast of matches and complementary shows like Dawrina and the popular Al Jamahir, which interviewed fans of teams during and after matches with all of their emotional outbursts when their teams lost.

Due to the development of the UAE Football League and the increasing number of events taking place simultaneously, Dubai Sports expanded to include Dubai Sports 2 & 3, which act as a simulcast except during multiple live events. The expansion of the channels has also been an attempt to compete with other pan-Arab sports channels like Abu Dhabi Sports Channel (for local events), Al Jazeera Sports and ShowSports (for international events). But due to budget limitations, the channel has not been able to fully compete and has since lost some of its popularity.

Official Site: الرئيسية

=== Dubai Racing ===
In essence, an extension of Dubai Sports, but with its own brand and identity, Dubai Racing is the only horse racing and camel racing TV channel in the Middle East. Specifically dedicated to coverage of horse racing events in the UAE like the Dubai World Cup, various camel races and accompanying programs. The channel originally took all of its content from Dubai Sports and larger sporting events are simulcast on Dubai Sports.

=== Dubai Zaman ===
Dubai Zaman was launched on 23 April 2015 to show old programs and films from the 70's, 80's and 90's.

=== Dubai Drama ===
Dubai Drama was launched on 23 April 2015 (the same day Dubai Zaman was launched) to show dramatic shows in Arabic. The channel ceased operations in 2016.

== Radio Stations ==
=== Noor Dubai ===
Noor Dubai (FM 93.9) was originally launched by Arab Media Group in 2005, replacing Dubai FM which had the same frequency. The channel's slogan was "A community channel with an Islamic perspective", it was intended to be a conservative radio station which did not air any music, while still serving the community through talk shows about various topics facing the community along with religious programming and Anasheed (instead of music). The most popular program was a morning call-in show called Al Bath Al Mubashar ("The Live Broadcast") which allowed anyone in the community to call in with their thoughts, opinions or complaints on almost any topic, but it was predominantly government-related service issues, the host would then call up the responsible agency to find solutions to the issues.

=== Dubai Radio ===
On 30 August 2011, the same day as Eid al-Fitr, DMI launched Dubai FM on the frequency 93. The channel expanded DMI's radio stations, utilizing the infrastructure and expertise of the Noor Dubai station. Dubai FM is a youth-oriented channel with talk shows and music aimed at the more liberal Emirati youth market.

Official Site: إذاعة دبي

=== Stereo 973 FM ===
Stereo 97 FM (97.3 MHz) is a flagship English-language radio station a site with over 50 years of broadcasting heritage. The channel's slogan is "Where the music of your life lives," positioning it as a bridge between the 1960s heritage of Dubai and the modern hits of today.

== Newspapers Printing, publishing & Distribution ==
=== Al Bayan ===
Al Bayan was established in 1980 by the government of Dubai as a part of the Dubai Media Department. It reported on local news, Arab news and some international news, it was known for its critical coverage and political views of events in Arab world, but in essence it was considered the official news paper of government of Dubai and so was very popular among local readers working in the government sector. It later moved to Arab Media Group where it was rebranded, giving it a new look and making the whole newspaper in full color. This was an attempt to target a younger audience, but was ultimately unsuccessful as there was not a significant change in the content. Now Daily Al Bayan Pakistan also launched in Pakistan.

Since the 2009 AMG-DMI merger, the newspaper is a part of Dubai Media Incorporated.

=== Emarat Al Youm ===
Emarat Al Youm (Emirates Today) was launched in 2005 by Arab Media Group. The newspaper was part of an experimental structure in which its sister newspaper, the English-language Emirates Today, had the same team of reporters, in essence the same news paper but in two languages. While the popularity of Emarat Al Youm grew amongst the younger readers, Emirates Today proved unpopular amongst the expatriate population compared to the already established English-language newspapers and was ultimately shut down. The popularity of Emarat Al Youm is attributed to its concentration on community issues and news, rather than politics and governmental issues.

In 2009, the newspaper was suspended from publication for 20 days from 6 July on the instructions of an Abu Dhabi Federal Court of Appeal ruling, upheld by the Supreme Federal Court of the UAE. The newspaper had been sued by the owners of the Warsan Stables (the Abu Dhabi Royal Family) for publishing a story in 2006 claiming their horses had been drugged with steroids.

== See also ==
- Dubai One
- Dubai Sports
- Dubai TV
- Arab Media Group
- Dubai Media City
- Zeina Soufan
- Stereo 97 FM
