= Zena (given name) =

Zena is a feminine given name. Notable people with the name include:

- Zena Cardman (born 1987) American marine biologist and a NASA astronaut
- Zena Cherry (1915–2000), Canadian journalist
- Zena Dare (1887–1975), English singer and actress
- Zena Edwards (born 1960s), British performance poet
- Zena Keefe (1896–1977), American silent film actress
- Zena Mahlangu (born 1984), Swazi royal
- Zena Marshall (1925–2009), British actress
- Zena McNally (born 1979), English singer
- Zena Skinner (1927–2018), English chef and television presenter
- Zena Temkin (1923–2017), American politician
- Zena Tooze (born 1955), Canadian biologist and conservationist
- Zena Upshaw or Zeke Upshaw (1991–2018), American men's basketball player
- Zena Walker (1934–2003), English actress
- Zena Werb (1945–2020), cell biologist at University of California, San Francisco
- Zinaida Kupriyanovich (born 2002), Belarusian singer, sometimes known as Zena

== See also ==
- Zina (given name)
