= Dubai Creek Tower =

Observation tower under construction in Dubai

- برج خور دبي
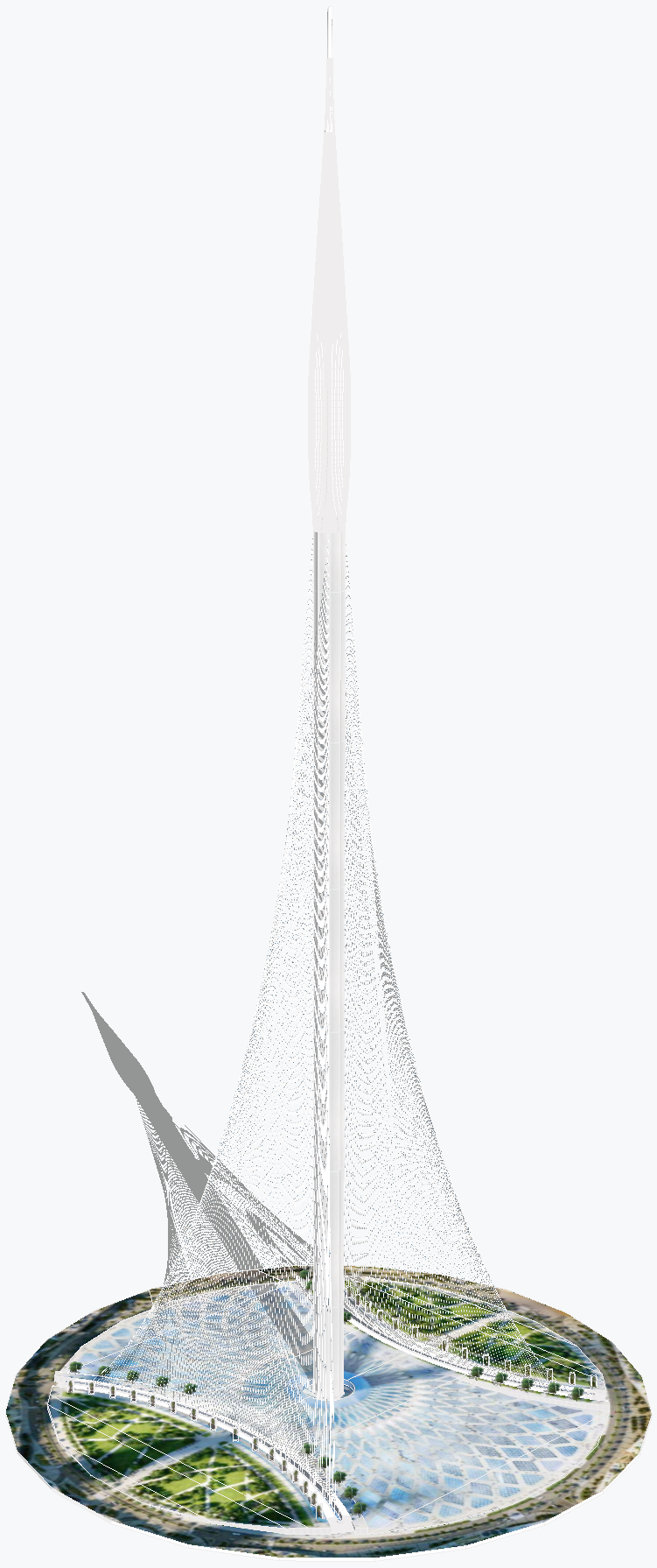
- Interactive map of the Dubai Creek Tower area
- Alternative names: Lagoon Tower, Dubai City Tower

General information
- Status: Under construction
- Type: Broadcast, restaurant and observation tower
- Location: Dubai Creek, Dubai, United Arab Emirates
- Coordinates: 25.1976°N 55.3551°E
- Construction started: October 11, 2016
- Estimated completion: 2030
- Opening: 2030
- Cost: US$1 billion

Design and construction
- Architect: Santiago Calatrava
- Developer: Emaar Properties
- Structural engineer: Santiago Calatrava

Dubai Creek Tower (Arabic: برج خور دبي) is a proposed supported observation tower to be built in Dubai, United Arab Emirates. The preliminary cost of the tower was estimated at AED 3.67 billion. It was expected to be completed in 2021 at the earliest, but tower construction was put on hold at the start of the COVID-19 pandemic.

Project developer Emaar Properties talked about a minimum height of at least 1,300 metres (4,300 ft), with 13:8 golden ratio with Burj Khalifa; however, in February 2024, it was reportedly reduced to be less than the height of Burj Khalifa, Dubai's tallest skyscraper.

The first design is inspired by the Islamic architectural tradition, specifically, the architecture of minarets. Unlike skyscrapers, the floors will be mostly observation decks or sky gardens. An antenna will be used for broadcasting. The tower is being built on a waterfront area in Dubai Creek Harbour.

== Concept ==
Emaar chairman Mohamed Alabbar described the new project as an "elegant monument" which is going to add value to property being developed by the company along the city's creek. "The tower will be slender, evoking the image of a minaret, and will be anchored to the ground with sturdy cables.

On 15 January 2017, a revised model of the original design was displayed at the Sales Center of the complex. The Observation deck height and the floor count was increased.

In February 2017, a rendering of the Tower appeared, which depicted it as a building supported by cables. Also, in one article, it was announced that the name of the tower will be Creek Tower.

The tower was initially expected to open in time for the Expo 2020 event in Dubai, but the COVID-19 pandemic has delayed both the Expo and the tower's construction.

According to Aurecon, the engineering firm working on the project, the tower would emit a 'beacon of light' from its peak at night. At the top will be an oval-shaped bud, housing ten observation decks, including The Pinnacle Room, which will offer 360-degree views of the city. The design includes a distinctive net of steel cable stays that attach to a central reinforced concrete core that will reach into the sky.

The tower has visualized to become the next global icon. The main architecture /designer of the tower structure was done by Spanish/Swiss architect and engineer Santiago Calatrava. The tower will provide 360-degree views of Dubai.

== Construction ==
In October 2016, Mohammed bin Rashid Al Maktoum attended the groundbreaking for the tower which began the tower's construction with the planned opening being in 2025.

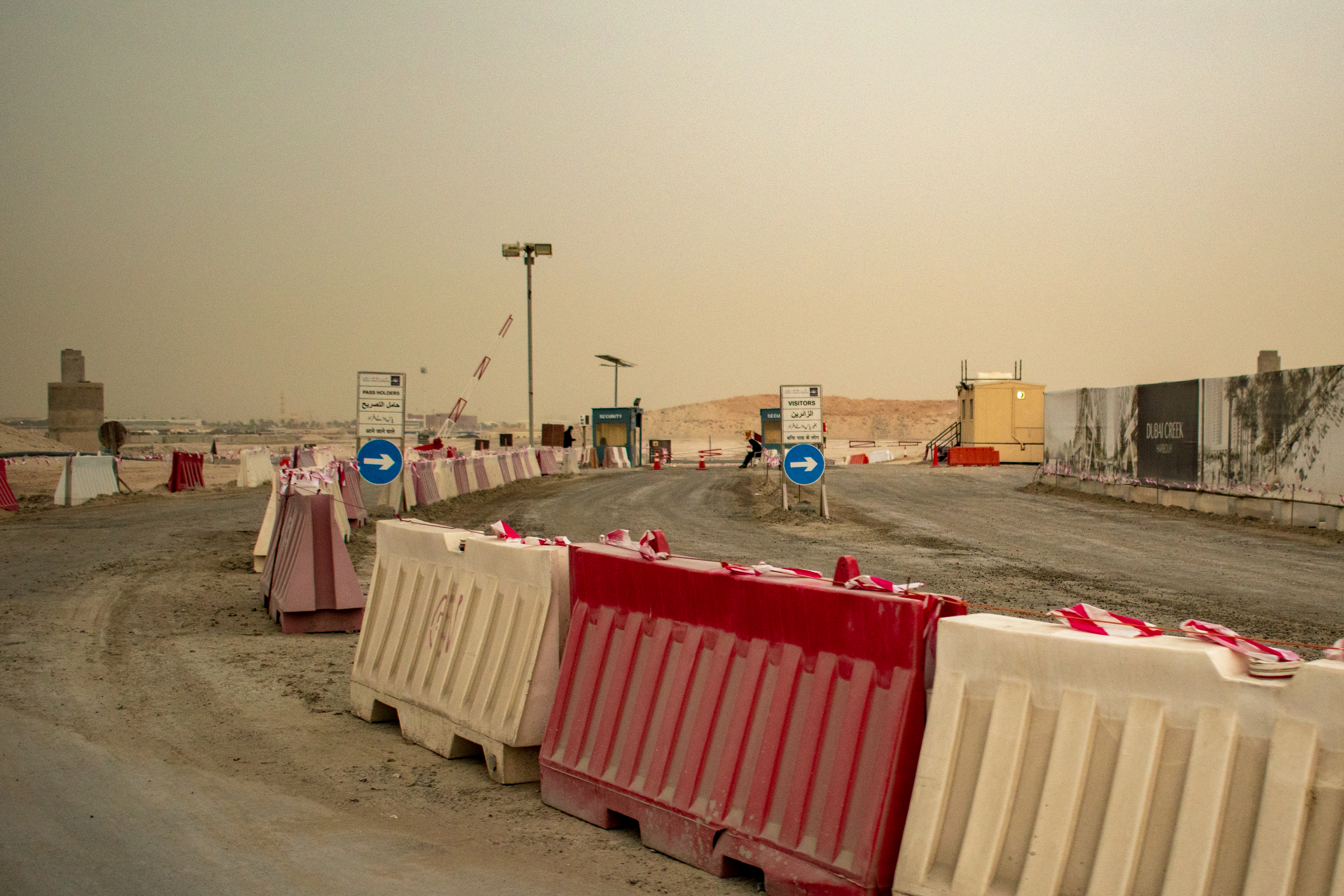
Dubai Creek Tower construction site entrance

A video showing the construction so far was released in August 2017. In May 2018, BESIX subsidiary Six Construct completed the foundations for the Tower. Construction of the main part of the tower did not commence after the foundations were completed. As of July 2019, the tender process to award the construction contract for the project was still ongoing.

By May 2018 foundation preparations were completed.

=== Delay ===
On 4 April 2020, Emaar Properties, developer of the Tower and surrounding area, halted construction temporarily due to the COVID-19 pandemic. At that time, no construction activity had occurred on the site of Dubai Creek Tower for almost two years. All mentions and renders of the tower were removed from the project's website at some point during July or August 2020. As of 7 December 2020, the construction was delayed indefinitely until the government allowed work to resume once the pandemic was under control.

In August 2023, Emaar Properties' founder, Mohamed Alabbar, confirmed that Dubai Creek Tower was undergoing a redesign process to enhance its architectural concept.

== New plan ==
In February 2024, Alabbar announced that the tower would be reduced in height to be shorter than Burj Khalifa, with the first look at the redesigned tower expected "within the next couple of months". However, Dubai Creek tower will still become one of the tallest structures in the world. Construction restarted in March 2024, with the final design initially expected to be unveiled in April 2024. In January 2026, Emaar founder Mohamed Alabbar said the tender for Dubai Creek Tower would be launched within the next three months. In June 2026, Alabbar said that the tender was delayed.

== See also ==
- Guy-wire
- Warsaw Radio Mast
