= Zina (given name) =

Zina is a given name. It may be an East Slavic diminutive of the female given name Zinaida. Notable people with the name include:

- Zina Andrianarivelo-Razafy (born 1951), Madagascan diplomat
- Zina Bethune (1945–2012), American actress, dancer and choreographer
- Zina D. H. Young (1821–1901), American social activist and religious leader
- Zina Garrison (born 1963), American tennis player
- Zina Goldrich (born 1964), musical theater composer
- Zina Hitchcock (1755–1832), New York politician
- Zina Kocher (born 1982), Canadian biathlete
- Zina Pitcher (1797–1872), American physician, politician and academic administrator
- Zina Saunders (born 1953), Manhattan-based artist-writer

== See also ==
- Zena (given name)
