= Dubai Towers Doha =

- أبراج دبي الدوحة
- Rendering of the building

- Location within Doha

General information
- Status: Under construction
- Type: Hotel, office, residential, restaurant, retail
- Architectural style: Futurism, glass
- Location: Corniche Street, West Bay, Doha, Qatar
- Coordinates: 25°18′52″N 51°31′20″E
- Construction started: June 18, 2007
- Construction stopped: November 12, 2010
- Completed: est. 2029
- Cost: 2.3 Billion Qatari riyal (620 million USD)

Height
- Antenna spire: 437.0 m (1,433.7 ft)
- Roof: 400 m (1,300 ft)

Technical details
- Floor count: 91

Design and construction
- Architect: RMJM Architect of Record : Diwan Al Emara
- Developer: Sama Dubai (Dubai International Properties)
- Main contractor: Al Habtoor-Al Jaber Joint Venture

Dubai Towers - Doha is a stalled supertall skyscraper with a roof height of 400 m (1,300 ft) (spire height 437 m (1,434 ft)) developing in Doha, Qatar. The estimated cost of Dubai Towers - Doha is 2.3 billion Qatari Riyal (US$620 million). When completed, the structure would have been the tallest building in Qatar.

Located in the West Bay district of Doha, next to the Doha Corniche, the 90-story multi-use tower was being developed by Sama Dubai, which was plagued with legal troubles, and was formerly known as Dubai International Properties, the international real estate investment and development arm of Dubai Holding.

The project was contracted to a joint venture between Al-Habtoor and Al Jaber, while Robert Matthew Johnson Marshall (RMJM) are the architects and engineering consultants. The cost consultants are Hanscomb Consultants Inc. The Project Management consultant is Sama ECH.

When completed the mixed use tower was to include a 7,000 m^{2} (75,000 ft^{2}) retail area, 13 floors comprising a 225-room five-star hotel, 29 floors of office space and 31 floors containing 226 luxury apartments and three super luxury penthouses.

The project was severely delayed as a result of the financial crash in Dubai and legal troubles at Sama Dubai. Investors in the property had been advised that the building was 9 months behind schedule. By May 2010 only 29 of the proposed 84 stories had been built. At that building rate, this would suggest at least another 11-year delay until completion.

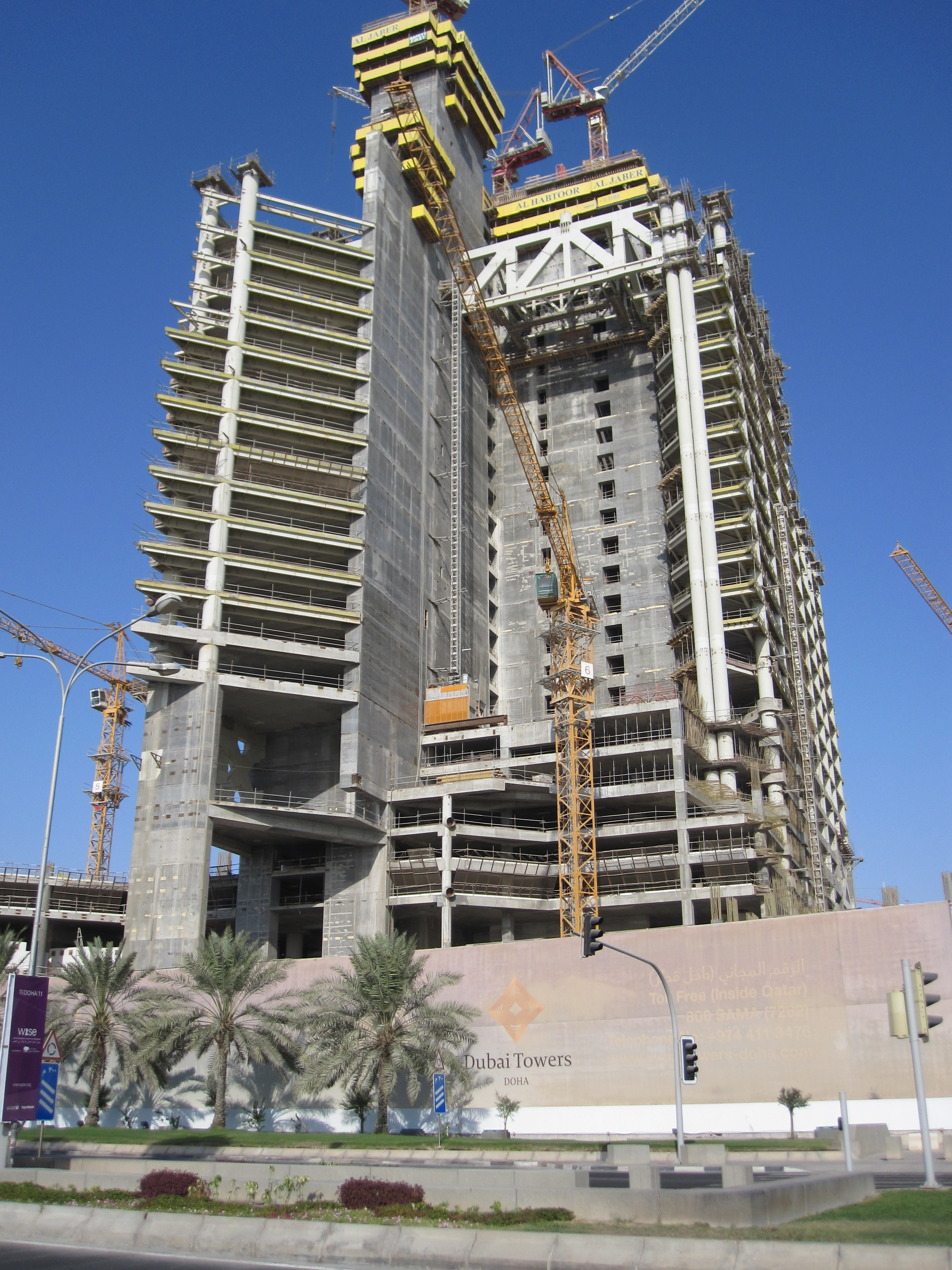
Dubai towers under construction (October 2011)

In February 2022, a few floors had been cladded in dirty glass.

As of December 2025, the building still stands in its partially constructed state and is visible in the Doha skyline.
