= Arab street =

Term for public opinion in the Arab world

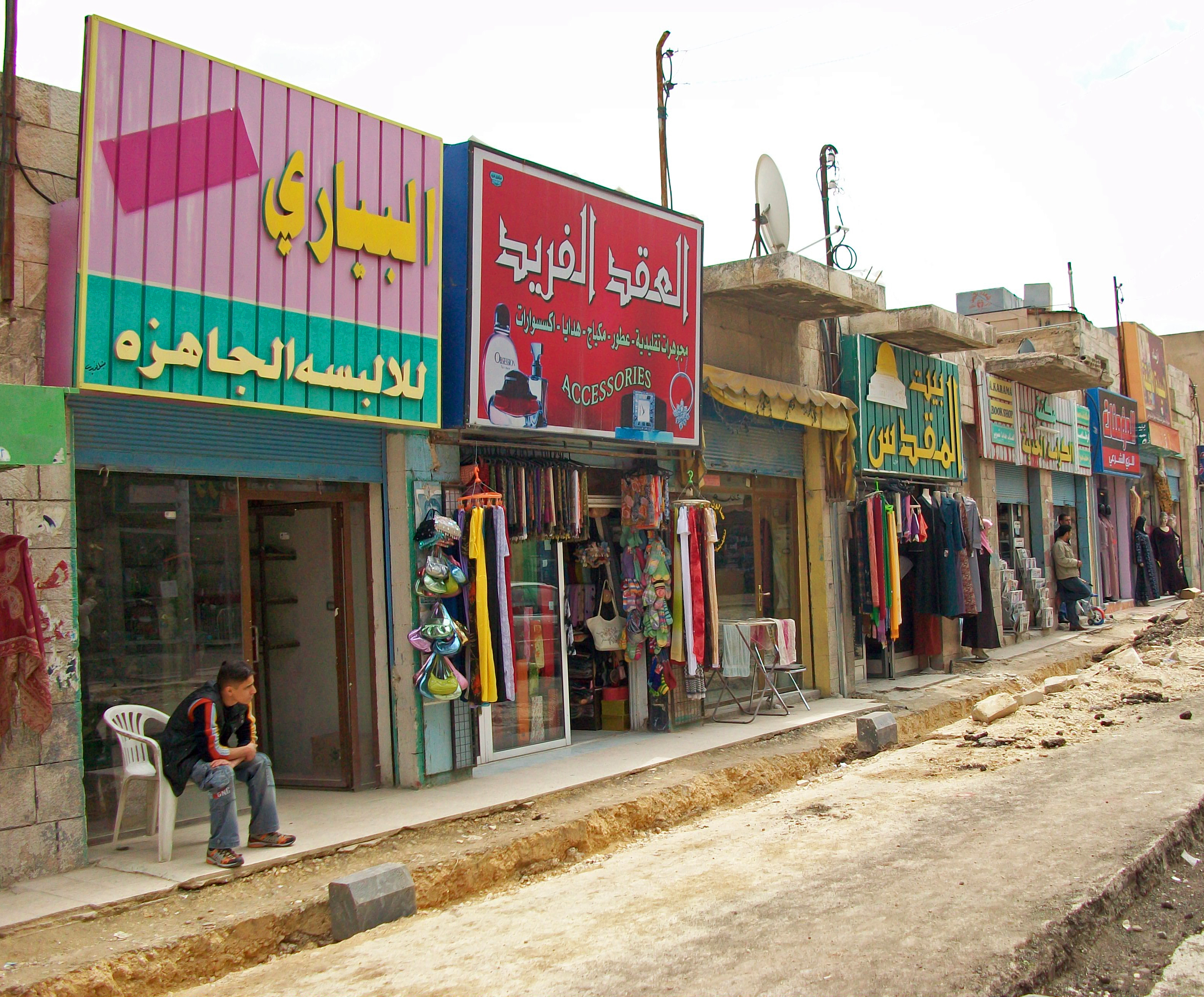
Streets have long been the primary place for public interaction in the Arab world, leading to the metaphoric use of "Arab street" for public opinion.

The Arab street (Arabic: الشارع العربي, ash-shāriʿ al-ʿarabī) is an expression referring to the spectrum of public opinion in the Arab world, often as opposed or contrasted to the opinions of Arab governments. In some contexts it refers more specifically to the lower socioeconomic strata of Arab society. It is used primarily in the United States and Arab countries.

While it is sometimes assumed, particularly in the United States, to have been borrowed from Arabic political discourse, its evolution has followed a circular course from Arabic to English and then back. Lebanese newspapers began referring to just "the street" during the 1950s; later in the decade reports in The New York Times used the term in English to explain Gamal Abdel Nasser's broad appeal not just in his native Egypt but across the Arab world. Later commentators added the "Arab" and eventually dropped the scare quotes to create the current usage, which became widespread in American media during the First Palestinian Intifada in 1987. Arab media began using it themselves a decade later. However, its usage still differs between the two languages. In the Western English-language media, only Arab popular sentiment is referred to as the "street"; Arabic commentators use the expression in the same sense to refer to not just public opinion in their countries but in the West as well.

Due to the many negative connotations attached to the use of "street" as a modifier, the use of the term in English has been criticized as fostering stereotypes of a population easily roused to violence. The "Arab street" thus alternately justifies the need for an authoritarian ruler, or constrains the potentially moderate actions of those rulers. In the wake of the Arab Spring early in the 2010s, the concept of the Arab street has been revisited and challenged. The revolutions that toppled governments have, to some, shown how deficient and outdated Western understandings of Arab public opinion, shaped by the concept of the "Arab street", had been and have even led some to suggest it no longer be used. Others, including some Arabs, saw the uprisings as vindicating the importance of public opinion in their cultures and changing the popular concept of the street within them.

== Definition ==
Attempts to directly define the Arab street have usually equated it with Arab public opinion. New York Times columnist Thomas Friedman, who once covered the Middle East and frequently writes about the region, called it "the broad mass of public opinion" there in 2002, as distinct from extremist opinion, which he calls the "Arab basement". As of 2013, Collins English Dictionary defines "the Arab street" as an informal term for "public opinion in the Arab world."

Nevertheless, even as the term came into wide use, there was disagreement about its exact meaning. In 2002 a U.S. State Department official, reporting on a meeting between President George W. Bush and the leaders of Japan and Pakistan, said that the latter, Pervez Musharraf, had referred to the "possibility of trouble in the Arab street, whatever that is" over the upcoming invasion of Iraq. This uncertainty has led to confusion over what the term represents. During the same period of time, Defense Secretary Donald Rumsfeld later recalled, Arab leaders urged him to make sure the operation went quickly as they "were worried about the 'Arab street' erupting in anger at the West's invasion of a Muslim country. I was skeptical of the idea that a monolithic Arab street existed ... but I did understand that popular discontent could cause them difficulties."

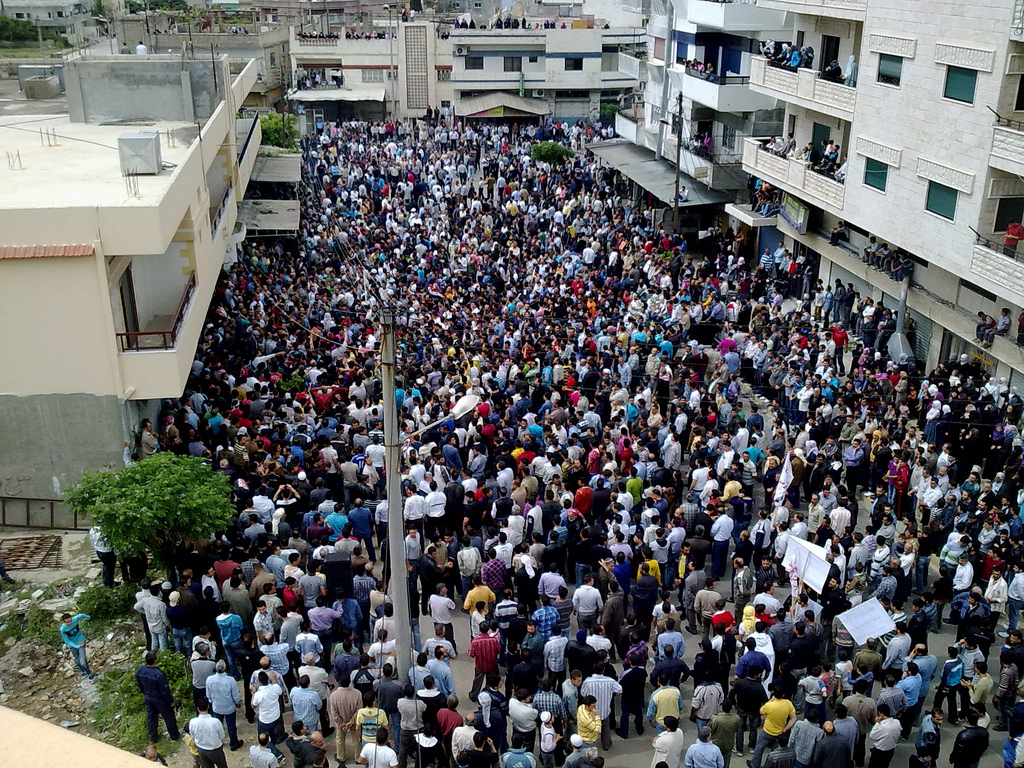
A large street demonstration in Baniyas preceding the Syrian Civil War.

According to a 2009 paper on the evolution and use of the term by professors Terry Regier and Muhammad Ali Khalidi, some of that confusion results from a frequent second meaning. encompassing the majority of Arab public opinion, they observe, another usage seems to associate it more specifically with "a presumed seething underclass within Arab society, one that is viewed primarily as a source of political trouble." In a 1993 exploration of the Arab street's existence, David Pollock of the Washington Institute for Near East Policy began by acknowledging these connotations: "The very name evokes images of mystery, mobs and mullahs; it sounds vaguely subterranean, if not sinister; and it is most often regarded in the West with a peculiar mixture of fascination, dismissal and fear."

In November 2001, a front-page New York Times article on the Arab street's power in the wake of the September 11 attacks invoked the term's visual connotations and the corresponding power vested in it by fearful Western observers, "The Arab street: the well-worn phrase evokes men clustered around dusty coffeehouse tables, discussing the events of the day with well-earned cynicism between puffs on a hookah—yet suddenly able to turn into a mob, powerful enough to sweep away governments." Ten years later, columnist Edwin Black wrote on the Fox News website, after protesters in Egypt began calling for longtime president Hosni Mubarak to step down, something that had previously been unthinkable, that the leader had fallen afoul of the Arab street,

... a dusty, unimproved and irrepressible thoroughfare of fury whose frequent itinerary has been known and feared for generations in the Middle East ... Quite simply, the Arab Street refers to the unexpected potential for popular upheaval at any time in any Arab locale. With no democratic venues to express popular wrath, this wrath pours onto the street and acts out en masse against the established order.

=== Arabic ===
In Arabic, the word for street (الشارع, ash-shāriʿ (Note: This transliteration reflects the difference between sun and moon letters in Arabic, under which when the article al- is followed by certain consonants, among them sh-", the "l" sound is elided.)) is derived from a root whose other forms denote a place of entry or beginning, the point of a weapon, and law or lawfulness and legitimacy in both the secular and religious sense. Among those words are sharia, the term for Islamic religious and moral law. Shāriʿ itself can also be used to refer to a legislator or lawgiver, and when used with the definite article al- in a religious context is a reference to God as the source of all religious law.

According to Regier and Khalidi, Arabic commentators use the term much as it is used in the West, when they discuss public opinion in the Arab world. However, they also refer to the "streets" of other, non-Arab countries in much the same way—"feelings of anger and shock are running very high in the American street [after the September 11 attacks]", for example. And in contrast to the fear of political upheaval frequently implied by Western writers, their use of "the Arab street" often carries positive and respectful overtones, such as when Al-Ayyam praised "the great Egyptian street, which has always been the heart and conscience of the Arabs" in 1997. Hezbollah leader Hassan Nasrallah provided an example of both differences in usage when he praised "the Israeli street" for its reaction to the Winograd report on Israel's conduct of the 2006 Lebanon War.

== History ==
"Arab street" arises originally from Arabic usage, but only became widely recognized through English adaptation.

=== English ===
In English, the earliest use of the word "street" in reference to the political role of popular opinion Regier and Khalidi found was that cited in the Oxford English Dictionary's (OED) entry on the word, where one of its definitions in the plural is "loosely as the realm of the common man, and esp. the source of popular political support." Wyndham Lewis's 1931 book Hitler, a defense of the German dictator that he later disowned, credited Hitler's political success in part to his "mastery of the street", which the OED reported as the earliest use of the word in that political sense. It did not enter widespread use at that time.

The earliest use of "street" in a political context that Regier and Khalidi could find was a 1950 editorial in the Lebanese newspaper An-Nahar:

This poor street, or rather the poor sons of the street, or rather poor me and you, sons of the street!! ... The government pulls us to and fro ... and the opposition also pulls this way and that. All of them make grand claims on our behalf, on behalf of the street, on behalf of the children of the street ... By God, leave this street to its own problems, for it is dizzy, dizzy from the opium of politics and politicians, and the hashish of merchants and extortionists. Leave it, may God have mercy on you.

"The street," they wrote, "is here conceived as an aggrieved everyman, manipulated and exploited by the political class," a sense that later manifested itself in Western discourse.

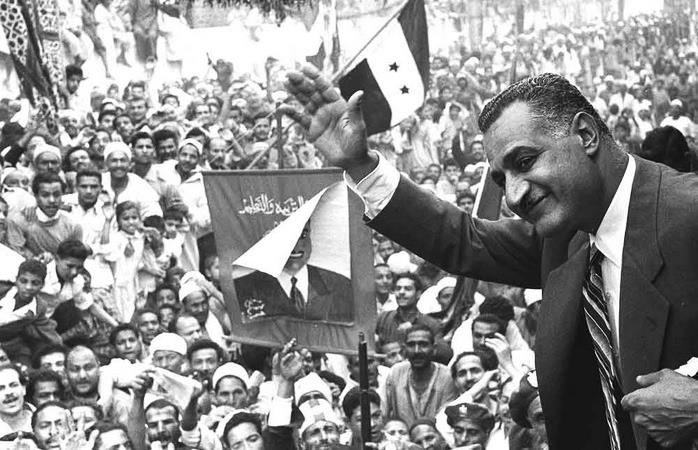
Egyptian president Gamal Abdel Nasser was described as enjoying the admiration of the 'street'

This usage made its debut in the American media early in 1957. Times correspondent Hanson Baldwin, in an article on the personalities in the Middle East in the wake of the previous year's Suez Crisis, focused on Gamal Abdel Nasser, president and prime minister of Egypt. Baldwin credited Nasser's success to "his appeal to 'the street', which carries great political power in the Arab world." He also inaugurated the concept of the street as a source of political danger to established hierarchies, saying Nasser's prestige was "probably at a new high with the Arab street mobs, by which Arab governments are so often made or broken." Two years later, the title and subtitle of a Times Magazine article made explicitly clear that the Arab mob and the street were related: "Power of 'The Street' in the Arab World; Here is an analysis of that frightening phenomenon, the mob, and the role it plays in the contest between freedom and tyranny in the Mideast."

Nasser himself, in speeches, often cited not the street but "al-gamāhīr" (Note: This transliteration reflects the pronunciation of the Arabic letter ج, often given the value /ʒ/, equivalent to an English soft "j", as /ɡ/ or an English hard "g", in Egyptian Arabic.) (الجماهير) as his political base. The Dictionary of Modern Written Arabic defines it as "the masses", or "the people"; in the singular it can mean "the public" or a crowd or throng of people. Another form of the same root is jumhūrīah, the word for republic.

Gamāhīr, rendered in English as "the masses", carries Marxist overtones of class struggle. Northwestern University professor Joe Khalil, who studies the Arab media, explains that it can "refer to everything from the indoctrinated members of a political party to a group of enthusiasts at a pop performance." Within a political context it most often denotes "several groups of people bound together by a common activity or ideology and easily recognizable within a larger population." The term, like the Pan-Arabism it was also associated with, gradually fell into disuse after Egypt was defeated by Israel both in the Suez Crisis and the Six-Day War of 1967.

"Street" was first grammatically modified by "Arab" in English in a 1970 article in The Review of Politics, a political science journal. The writer, Robert Sullivan, alluded to the role of "radio propaganda aimed at mobilizing the Arab 'street'" during military conflicts. Seven years later, another journal article by Steve J. Rosen argued that Israel's development of nuclear weapons would lead to "a revolution of declining expectations in the Arab 'street.'"

Regier and Khalidi speculate that the use of scare quotes by both Rosen and Sullivan suggest that they are using a term not familiar to them, something they may have adapted from a foreign language. Since both of them were academics specializing in Middle Eastern studies, it could be presumed that they had at least a reading knowledge of Arabic and were familiar with the term's use in Arabic media in the region, Regier and Khalidi argued. The two further speculated that Rosen, who often took strongly pro-Israel positions and later became policy director of the American Israel Public Affairs Committee, may have also perhaps picked up the term from Israeli media and scholars, as the "street" terminology for popular opinion is also used sometimes in Hebrew. An Israeli attorney's 1987 comment to The Christian Science Monitor, that his country had never "tried to root out the PLO in the Arab street" was the first modern use in its present sense without the scare quotes. By the end of the decade it came into wide use in both American academic and popular media, as coverage of the First Palestinian Intifada dominated news from the region. This may have been the result of geopolitical shifts taking place at the same time. The New York Times language columnist William Safire anonymously quoted a Middle East expert who told him that before the late 1980s the term "Arab masses" had been used instead. "With the eclipse of the Soviet Union, that phrase disappeared because [it] had too much of a Marxist–Soviet–Communist tilt to it." In his 1992 paper on the Arab street as a political phenomenon, David Pollock uses "Arab masses" only once, and in quotes.

=== Arabic ===
The first use of the term "Arab street" in Arabic media occurred in 1997. The two researchers were not certain whether it had seen any use prior to that year as the database they used only went as far back as 1995. It has become quite common in Arabic media since then, suggesting, according to Regier and Khalidi, that a term created in English from a borrowed Arabic term has been "re-imported" into Arabic.

== Criticism ==
=== Negative connotations ===
While sometimes the American media used "Arab street" as to be interchangeable with "Arab public opinion," suggesting rationality and calm, Regier and Khalidi found that most uses carried the connotations of incipient unrest. "We propose that a central association of the Arab street is indeed that of a volatile potential mob, dangerous to the established order of Arab states, and thus to any agreements Western powers may have with those states." While users may not always have intended it that way, in many cases they did.

They identified three factors that gave rise to these connotations. First, other common English phrases such as "man in/on the street", "street smart" and "the word on the street" suggest the street is associated with uneducated and possibly misinformed opinion. The street is further associated with illegality through terms like "street crime" and the "street value" of contraband such as illicit drugs. Both of these, Regier and Khalidi observe, help strengthen the sense that the Arab street's opinions are uninfluenced and uncontrollable by any official source or body.

Lastly, terms like "street person" for one who is homeless and "streetwalker" for a prostitute link the street to desperate personal circumstances. Regier and Khalidi note that this has historical connections to the term "street Arab", for a homeless child, now out of regular use but still encountered by readers of Sir Arthur Conan Doyle's Sherlock Holmes mysteries, where the titular character relied at times on a network of such individuals as informants. Edward Said, a Palestinian-born professor of English literature at Columbia University who frequently spoke and wrote on behalf of his people's cause, along with casting a critical eye on Western "orientalism" and how it affected perceptions of non-Western cultures such as the Arab world, explicitly and critically drew the connection between the two terms, they note, quoting him as saying:

There's a kind of unconscious identification between the word "street" in connection with the Arabs, and the late 19th and early 20th-century usage of the term "street Arab". Street Arabs are vagrants ... So I think referring to the "Arab street" in this way suggests that these are riff-raff, the kind of unimportant flotsam and jetsam of a society which is basically made up of barbarians and subhuman people. I think it's not an accident that this term is always used to talk about Arab public opinion.

Regier and Khalidi write that the view of the Arab street, and by extension all Arab public opinion, as that of a mob always poised to rise violently, does Western publics a disservice. Not only is it inaccurate, it confronts them with "something quite unlike Westerners' conception of their own publics ... It has the potential to contribute to an ongoing misreading of the Arab public among U.S. readers."

=== Harmful to Arab-American relations ===
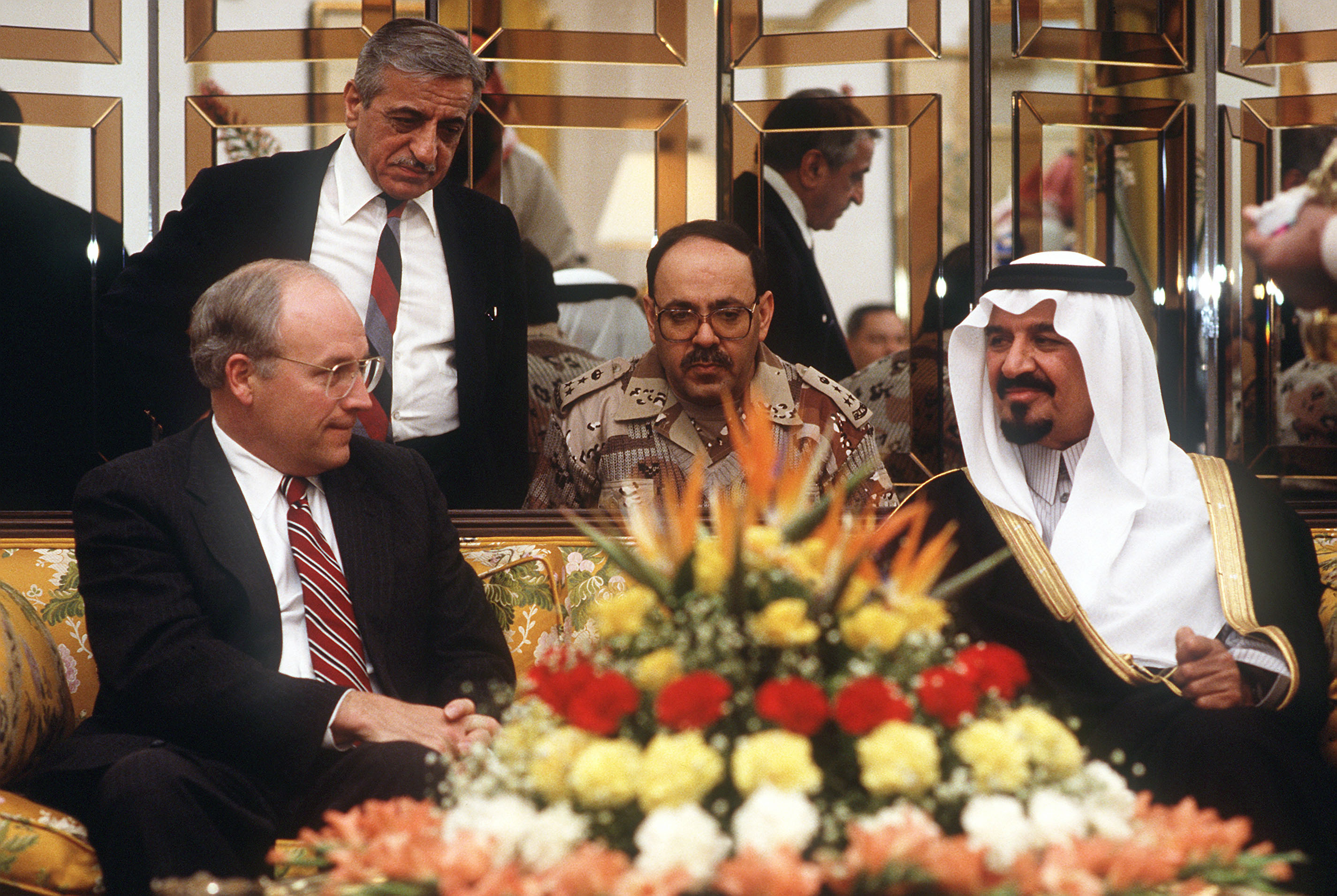
Before the war, U.S. officials like Dick Cheney (left) worried that unrest on the Arab street would upset their relationship with Arab counterparts like Saudi Arabia's Sultan bin Abdulaziz

In late 1990 after Iraqi forces under Saddam Hussein invaded and occupied Kuwait, ultimately leading to the Gulf War, American commentators and Middle East experts expressed concern about the possible consequences of the Arab street in the region rising up in support of Saddam against their own governments, many of whom (particularly Egypt) had joined the military coalition led by the United States. This did not happen when the actual war began, nor for the hundred days of combat before Iraqi forces retreated and surrendered. A year later, in 1992, David Pollock of the United States Information Agency (USIA) wrote a lengthy paper arguing that those commentators had seriously misunderstood the Arab street and, by extension, all Arab public opinion.

As applied, Pollock saw two predominant conceptualizations of the Arab street. One, he called the "underrated" school, which usually claimed that "in the absence of Arab democratic institutions public opinion in those countries is politically irrelevant." Other members of that school went further, claiming that Arab public opinion was "unknowable, and therefore unfit for serious discussion." A small minority considered the Arab street a concept bound with Pan-Arabism, by then largely discredited, and by extension similarly irrelevant.

On the opposite side was what he called the "exaggerated" school, which saw the Arab elites as "already hopelessly alienated from the masses ... As a result, popular revolution (or at least paralyzing instability) is always around the corner in the Arab world." Proponents argued that, for that reason, the U.S. should turn its attention towards those who might hold power in a more democratic Arab world; otherwise, its relationships with Arab states will always be tenuous and unstable.

A key foundation of the "underrated" school's argument, Pollock wrote, was the tendency of the media in most Arab countries to be under state control or influence to a greater degree than in the West and therefore filtering information to the public and not reporting public opinion accurately, an experience informed by contemporary events in Eastern Europe. However, even in Syria, a coalition country where the government had the greatest control over the media, citizens still listened to the BBC, Radio Monte Carlo and Israeli and Saudi radio stations. In other countries, particularly some in North Africa, the media was relatively unrestricted during the conflict. Those mystified by the quiet on the Arab street during the conflict, he said, "neglected ... the possibility that different Arab publics generally supported the different policies pursued by their own governments towards the crisis."

In addition, it was also entirely possible that those governments had based their policies in part on public opinion. Arab governments, Pollock observed, were not indifferent to public opinion despite the absence of real democratic institutions. Officials in Saudi Arabia and other Gulf states held regular informal majlises (مجلس) and the Egyptian government took note of what was said at neighborhood discussion centers known as "listening posts." Some also consulted opinion polls. It was data from those that led him to believe that Jordan and Yemen both stayed out of the coalition in part because their leaders were aware that popular sentiment in their countries was strongly against participating, and they might have faced destabilizing civil unrest if they had.

Pollock was especially scornful of those who viewed the Arab street as irrelevant because it was unknowable. "This assumption sounds at once pathetic and presumptuous, a sorry combination of self-confessed intellectual ignorance and impotence ... For one thing, it should be self-evident that you cannot dismiss the Arab street just because you don't understand it." As for the "exaggerated" school, he first observed that there was, in fact, little history of real popular revolutions deposing governments in the modern Middle East with what he called the "debatable" exception of the 1958 Lebanon crisis, and not even many more unsuccessful attempts to do so via street uprisings. So, he noted with some bemusement, "the beauty of this argument is that it is invulnerable to disproof—because its proof lies in the future, which of course always lies ahead."

At the beginning of the following decade, the September 11 attacks made it likely that the U.S. would find itself fighting another war against a Muslim country, and again fears rose in the American media about the damage an angered Arab street could inflict on American interests in the region when actual combat began, especially with the Second Palestinian Intifada already underway. Another USIA employee, Nancy Snow, wrote about the problems created by the connotations of the term in 2011, when she had become a professor at Syracuse University's Newhouse School of Public Communications:

The term "Arab street" seemed to position a region of the world as particularly prone to mob rule ... I came to believe that part of the United States' problem with the Arab region was that the language we used in talking about it was overly paternalistic and stereotypical—that is, racist. Millions of Americans would hear about the Arab street in the media and assume that it meant a place where terrorism flourished, danger lurked around every corner and religious and political fanaticism were the norm. The way it is often presented, the Arab street could not possibly produce people with a healthy attitude towards the United States. It underscores a bigoted view in the West that Arabs are incapable of self-government because they lack sufficient logic to organize society out of so much chaos.

"In the narratives of the Western media," Asef Bayat wrote in 2011, "the 'Arab street' is damned if it does and damned if it doesn't", echoing a theme of Pollock's critique. After fears of violence across the Arab world proved exaggerated following the beginning of the Afghan War, commentators dismissed the Arab street as apathetic and harmless, only to suddenly reclaim it as an object of fear when popular protests erupted all over the region in response to Israel's 2002 invasion of the West Bank. He denounced the term as a colonialist and Orientalist creation, similar to an earlier term "the Arab mind", which "reified the culture and collective conduct of an entire people in a violent abstraction."

While Tunisian writer Larbi Sadiki agrees that the negative connotations of "Arab street" are harmful to public discourse about the region in the West, he puts some of the blame for its widespread use on Arabs themselves. "It is no exaggeration to say that 'public opinion' has not had any presence to speak of in the Arabic political vocabulary," he wrote in 2009. It did not emerge into Arabic political discussion alongside the idea of universal suffrage when that became a goal of Arab activists in the early 20th century, he notes, and polling organizations did not consequently form as they did in the West. Thus the notion of the Arab street filled the void. The Arabic term for public opinion, الرءئ العمم (ar-raʾī al-ʿamm), is a direct translation of the English expression. "There is no other Arabic term that conveys an equivalent meaning."

To make the distinction between mainstream and extremist Arab opinion clear, in 2002 Jordanian journalist Rami George Khouri suggested calling the latter the "Arab basement." New York Times columnist Thomas Friedman picked it up, noting that the Arab street, in opposition to the "basement", is "largely passive and nonviolent." While the U.S. and the West had no choice but to defeat the basement, since it was beyond reason, he said it was not too late to work with Arab states to address the very real grievances that led from the street to the basement. "If America made clear that it was going into Iraq," he wrote, "not just to disarm Iraq but to empower Iraq's people to implement the Arab Human Development Report, well, the Arab basement still wouldn't be with us, but the Arab street just might."

== Arab Spring ==
Beginning in 2011, popular uprisings that came to be collectively known as the Arab Spring deposed dictatorships in Tunisia, Egypt and Yemen. Similar mass movements were put down in Bahrain and touched off the Syrian Civil War. Libyan strongman Muammar Gaddafi was killed after a civil war. "Those accustomed to the region's repressive status quo have been caught by surprise", wrote two editors of an anthology of writings by younger Arabs. "Young Middle Easterners—typically viewed with trepidation as part of a reactionary 'Arab street' or simply overlooked as masses passively acquiescing to despots—have shattered stereotypes by leading dignified struggles in the face of overwhelming repression."

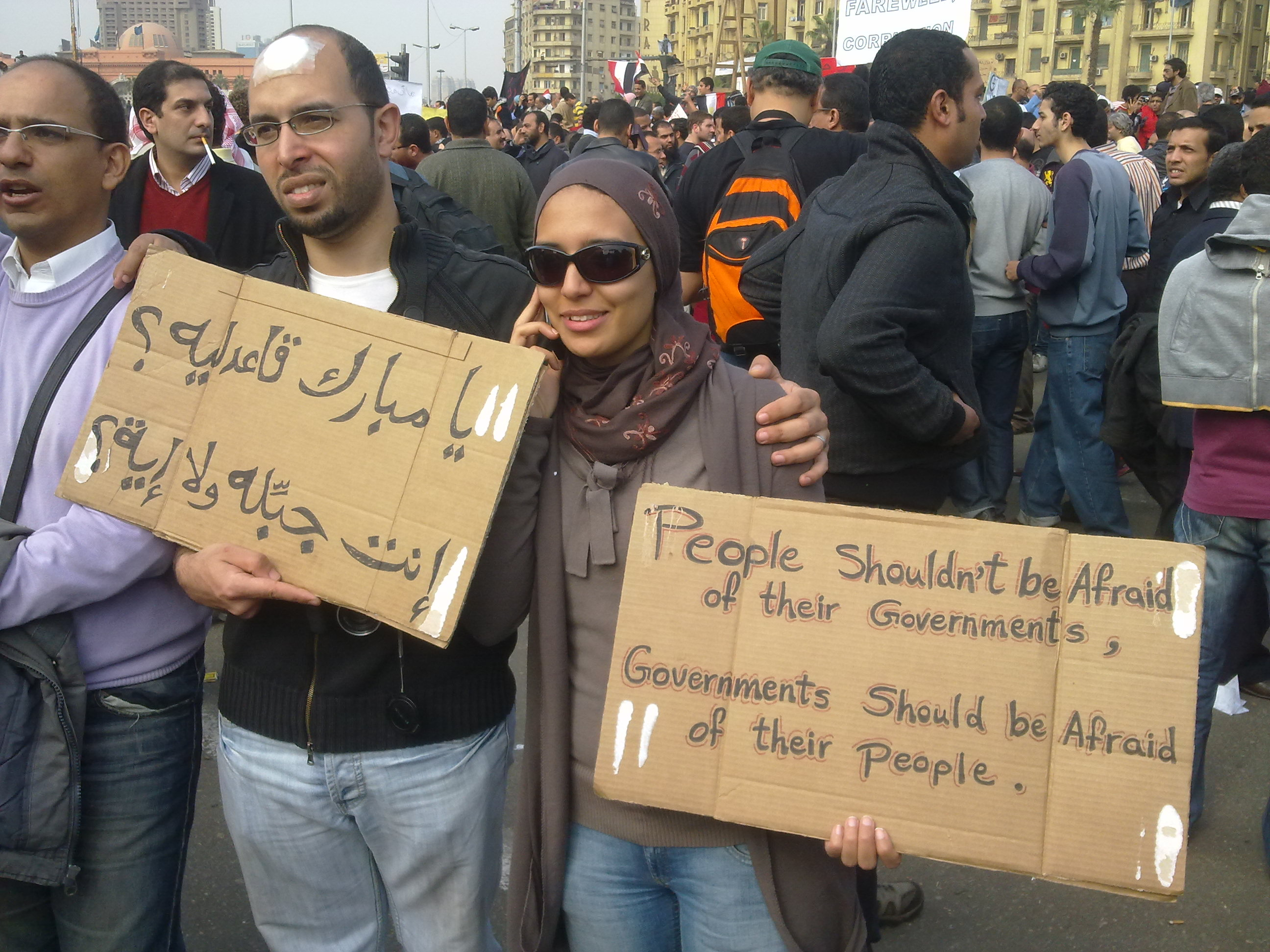
Young protesters in Tahrir Square, February 2011. The Arab Spring challenged notions of the Arab street

Western commentators, particularly after the protests in Egypt forced Hosni Mubarak to step down, reconsidered the concept of the Arab street and whether or not it had, indeed, ever been an accurate representation of public opinion in the region. "I'm convinced the country has what it takes to build a decent, representative society—one that gives the lie to all the stereotypes associated with that dismissive shorthand 'The Arab Street.'" Roger Cohen wrote from Cairo the day afterward in The New York Times. "In fact, post-Tahrir, let's retire that phrase." "[F]arewell to it, once and for all," agreed Fouad Ajami shortly afterwards, noting that Arabs had never risen up in response to violence against Kurds or Shiites, particularly the 1978 disappearance of popular Shiite Imam Musa al-Sadr, widely believed to have been ordered by Gaddafi.

Arab commentators agreed. "[E]vents in Egypt and elsewhere have exposed the myth of 'the Arab street' as a shallow caricature of the complex reality behind the revolutionary movements now sweeping the Arab world," wrote Hassan Malik, a Harvard graduate student. He noted that in both Tunisia and Egypt the protesters had been a diverse group in every way that had been motivated by a desire for political freedom, not the Islamic fundamentalism so often feared to be motivating the street in the West. "It is time for Washington and its allies to drop their fears of 'the Arab street' and unequivocally and genuinely support the popular revolution in Egypt—or to get out of the way."

On the English-language website of the Lebanese newspaper Al Akhbar, Syrian journalist Ula Shaybeddine recalled how the uprisings had changed the meaning of the word "street" for his generation. Once, much as it had been in English, it had been "a space for thieves, drug addicts, prostitutes, beggars, and 'riffraff.'" But now there was "a new understanding of the Arab 'street,'" he wrote. "We are beginning to understand why the powers that be wanted us to believe all those lies about [it]." He said it had now become "a place of righteousness and honor, beauty and justice ... the space where our youth came of age, as they rebelled against injustice, abuse, and humiliation."

== See also ==
- Arab culture
