= Zeina el Tibi =

French–Lebanese journalist

Zeina el Tibi is a French–Lebanese journalist living in Paris. She is editor in chief of Al Ayam (The Days) magazine (Beirut).Sie is doctor in Law (droit public)

== Posts held ==
Dr el Tibi is President of the Observatoire d'études géopolitiques (Center for Geopolitical Studies) in Paris. She is codirector, with Charles Saint-Prot, of the journal Etudes Géopolitiques (Geopolitical Studies) published in Paris.

She is Chairwoman of the Association des femmes arabes de la presse et de la communication (AFACOM: Association of Arab Women of the Press and Communication) in Paris.

== Family ==
El Tibi is from a well-known family in the Lebanese press. Her uncle, Afif el Tibi, was the President of the Order of Press in Lebanon and her father, Wafic el Tibi, was the President of the Union of Lebanese journalists and the proprietor of the daily Al Yom.
