= Larbi Sadiki =

Larbi Sadiki is a Tunisian writer, political scientist and professor of political science and democratization at the College of Arts and Sciences of Qatar University. He was formerly a scholar at the Carnegie Middle East Center and lecturer at University of Exeter. Sadiki's writing focuses on the democratization of the Arab world as well as human rights studies and dialogue between the Western and Islamic civilizations.

== Works ==
- The Search for Arab Democracy: Discourses and Counter-Discourses. Columbia University Press, 2004.
- (ed.)Routledge Handbook of the Arab Spring. Rethinking Democratization Routledge, 2015.
