= Youth in the Arab world =

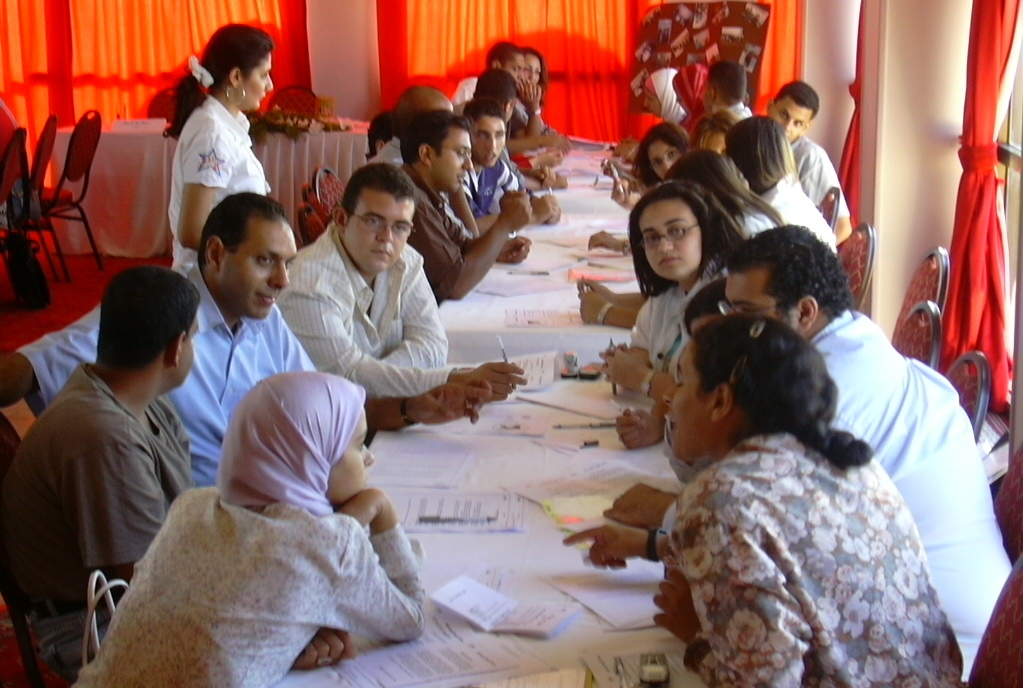
A group of Egyptian youth at a workshop

Youth consist of over 32% of the population of the Arab region. The Arab world comprises 22 countries and territories as designated by the Arab League. Youth between the ages of 15 and 24 years old represent over 100 million of the current population. Since youth are such a large portion of the population, they have the ability to create social change or movements by uniting and mobilizing. The Arab Spring is an example of how youth uniting can have a great influence on policy. By mobilizing and accessing the technology of today, they are able to voice their opinions and views in mass numbers across all media platforms. With the sheer numbers of youth getting involved online, young people are able to draw worldwide attention and help to organize the agendas that they value. Yet, "efforts by the region’s youth to forge a more positive future for themselves and coming generations has been subsumed by events, and efforts to forge constructive solutions to the long-standing economic challenges facing the region’s youth have largely been sidelined by more immediate concerns related to security and political stability."

== Politics ==
One example of youth creating a change in society is found in Lebanon's parliamentary elections in 2009. After the assassination of Rafic Hariri, a prime minister of Lebanon who helped build the wealth of the country, around 1 million Lebanese took to the streets of Beirut. Their protests efforts to pass voting for their next government leader were successful. Youth played a significant role in the elections of 2009. Even youth who could not vote, due to being under 21, helped fuel activism by using social media to call out youth who they knew had not voted yet. The Lebanese youth created a higher level of importance to politics than any other previous generation. This reshapes the way the people in Lebanon view politics, and ways in which they can create the change they want in the government.

The technology expansions of information and communications technology(ICT) have shaped the way in which youth today are able to communicate. Specifically in Morocco, Facebook completely changed the way social interactions occur between youth. 79% of all Moroccans on Facebook consist of youth between the ages of 15 and 29. The ability of young people to use social media and be proficient creates a generational gap between youth and adults. The Moroccan youth are able to use Facebook as a private way in communicating with minimal adult interaction. With the Arab Spring happening around Morocco and surrounding communities, youth were able to set up their own social movement through Facebook. Between January and February 2011, 590,360 new users of Facebook emerged in Morocco alone. Youth's deep understanding of advancements in social media and technology have created and environment where they are able to organize protests. One way that they were successful was known as the 2011–2012 Moroccan protests.

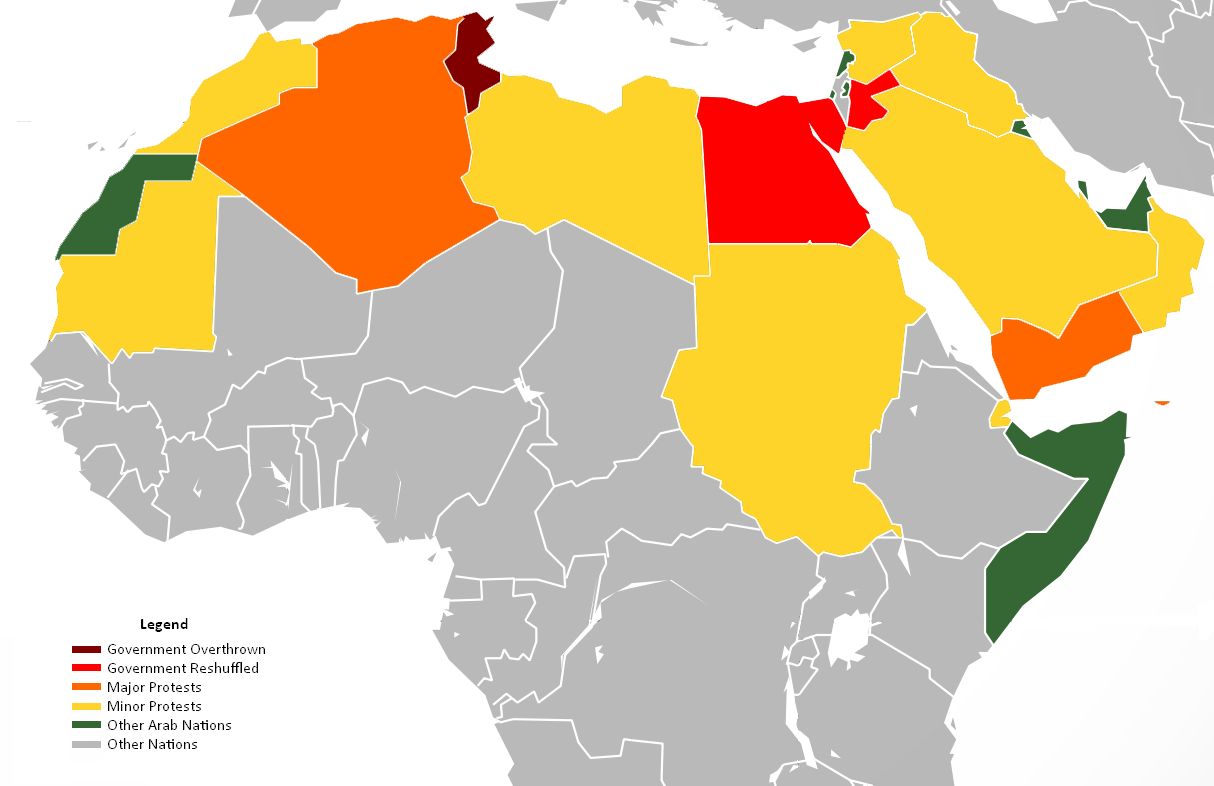
Arab World Protests Map As of 2.17.11

== Education ==
With such major growth in Arab youth population, two things begin to lack; education as well as job opportunity. "While countries across the region had made tremendous strides in bolstering rates of educational attainment within their populations, particularly for young women, educational outcomes have not provided youth with the skills sought out by private sector employers in the region." Due to large enrollment numbers in education each individuals access begins to decrease. A world bank report in 2008,"estimated that the secondary school population in the region will grow by one-third during the next 30 years, and that tertiary education cohorts will more than double". On top of an increase in youth and no change to the education system with greater demand, millions of kids are still unable to attend primary and secondary schooling. 13 million kids between the ages 6 and 15 are currently out of school or never have attended. Youth fall under this category for many reasons, some including; can't afford schooling, are already employed, disabled, or live within an area where schooling is impossible due to conflicts.

== Employment ==
Education has a large effect on the ability to achieve stable employment. In the case of Arab youth, job opportunities begin to greatly decrease over time. Arab youth as a whole, have one of the greatest unemployment rates out of the entire world. A report done by The Arab Human Development found an unemployment of Arab youth at 30%, nearly doubling the world's unemployment at 14%. It is estimated by the year 2020 there would need to be 51 million jobs created in order to absorb the new workers in the labor market. With an increase in youth population, as well as lack of education the job market is inflated. With little optimism for future education and employment many Arab youth consider leaving their countries to seek opportunities. One survey done on young people in the Arab league found that 30% wanted to permanently leave their country due to the dissatisfaction with their own nation. "Increasingly, job creation for youth has been found not in the formal sector, but in the large and growing informal sector in the region, where labor market regulations do not apply or are not enforced."
