= Arab world =

Geocultural region in Asia and Africa

- Member states of the Arab League
- Area: 13,132,327 km^{2} (5,070,420 sq mi)
- Population: ▲456,520,777
- Population density: 29.8/km^{2} (70.4/sq mi)
- GDP (nominal): $2.782 trillion
- GDP per capita: $6,647
- Demonym: Arab
- Countries: 19 Arab states: Algeria; Bahrain; Egypt; Iraq; Jordan; Kuwait; Lebanon; Libya; Mauritania; Morocco; Oman; Palestine; Qatar; Saudi Arabia; Sudan; Syria; Tunisia; United Arab Emirates; Yemen
- Dependencies: Arab League
- Time zone: UTC±00:00 to UTC+04:00
- Largest cities: Major cities of the Arab world List: (Egypt) Cairo (Iraq) Baghdad (Saudi Arabia) Riyadh (Egypt) Alexandria (Jordan) Amman (Algeria) Algiers (Saudi Arabia) Jeddah (Morocco) Casablanca (Yemen) Sanaa (United Arab Emirates) Dubai

The Arab world (Note: Arabic: اَلْعَالَمُ الْعَرَبِيُّ, romanized: al-ʿĀlam al-ʿArabī; Also known as the Arab homeland; اَلْوَطَنُ الْعَرَبِيُّ al-waṭan al-ʿarabī), also known as the Arab nation (اَلْأُمَّةُ الْعَرَبِيَّةُ al-ummah al-ʿarabiyyah), the Arabsphere, or the Arab states,) comprises a large group of countries, mainly located in West Asia and North Africa. While the majority of people in the Arab world are ethnically Arab, there are also significant populations of other ethnic groups such as Berbers, Kurds, Somalis and Nubians, among other groups. Arabic is used as the lingua franca throughout the Arab world.

The Arab world is usually defined as the 19 states where Arabs form at least a plurality of the population. At its maximum definition it consists of the 22 members of the Arab League, an international organization, which on top of the 19 plurality Arab states also includes 3 non-Arab countries, namely the Comoros, Djibouti and Somalia. The region stretches from the Atlantic Ocean in the west to the Arabian Sea in the east, and from the Mediterranean Sea in the north to the Indian Ocean in the southeast. The eastern part of the Arab world is known as the Mashriq ("east" in Arabic) and the western part as the Maghreb ("west" in Arabic).

According to the World Bank, the Arab world has a total population of 456 million inhabitants and a gross domestic product of $2.85 trillion, as of 2021. The region is economically quite diverse, and includes some of the wealthiest as well as poorest populations in the world.

In post-classical history, the Arab world was synonymous with the historic Arab empires and caliphates. Arab nationalism arose in the second half of the 19th century along with other nationalist movements within the Ottoman Empire. The Arab League was formed in 1945 to represent the interests of Arab people and especially to pursue the political unification of the Arab countries, a project known as pan-Arabism.

== Terminology ==
In page 9 of Best Divisions for Knowledge of the Regions, 10th century Arab geographer Al Maqdisi used the term Arab regions (Note: Arabic: أَقَالِيمُ ٱلْعَرَبِ) to refer to the lands of the Arabian Peninsula (Bahrain, Iraq, Jordan, Kuwait, Oman, Qatar, Saudi Arabia, United Arab Emirates and Yemen). He also considered Iraq, alongside Upper Mesopotamia (Iraq, Syria and Turkey), Ash-Sham (Israel, Jordan, Lebanon, Palestine, Syria and Turkey), Egypt and the Maghreb (Algeria, Libya, Mauritania, Morocco, Tunisia and Western Sahara Sahrawi Arab Democratic Republic) to be part of the Arab regions.

Malta, an island country in Southern Europe whose national language, Maltese, derives from Arabic through Siculo‑Arabic, is not included in the Arab world. Similarly, Chad, Eritrea, and Israel recognize Arabic as one of their official or working languages but are not included in the region because they are not members of the Arab League.

== Definition ==
The linguistic and political denotation inherent in the term Arab is generally dominant over genealogical considerations. In Arab states, Standard Arabic is used by the government. Local vernacular languages are referred to as Darija (الدَّارِجَة "everyday/colloquial language") in the Maghreb or Aammiyya (ٱلْعَامِيَّة "common language") in the Mashreq. The majority of the vocabulary in these vernaculars is shared with Standard Arabic; however, some of them also significantly borrow from other languages, such as Berber, French, Spanish and Italian in the Maghreb.

=== Standard territorial ===
Although no globally accepted definition of the Arab world exists, all countries that are members of the Arab League are generally acknowledged as being part of the Arab world.

The Arab League is a regional organisation that aims, among other things, to consider in a general way the affairs and interests of the Arab countries and sets out the following definition of an Arab:

An Arab is a person whose language is Arabic, who lives in an Arab country, and who is in sympathy with the aspirations of the Arab people.

This standard territorial definition is sometimes seen to be inappropriate or problematic, and may be supplemented with certain additional elements (see ancillary linguistic definition below).

==== Member states of the Arab League ====
- Algeria (Arabic: الجزائر al-Jazā’ir): Berber is the second official language (minority)
- Bahrain (Arabic: البحرين al-Baḥrayn)
- Comoros (Arabic: جزر القمر Juzur al-Qumur): Comorian and French are the other official languages
- Djibouti (Arabic: جيبوتي Jībūtī): French is the other official language
- Egypt (Arabic: مصر Miṣr)
- Iraq (Arabic: العراق al-‘irāq): Kurdish is the second official language (minority)
- Jordan (Arabic: الأردن al-ʾurdun)
- Kuwait (Arabic: الكويت al-Kuwayt)
- Lebanon (Arabic: لبنان Lubnān)
- Libya (Arabic: ليبيا Lībyā)
- Mauritania (Arabic: موريتانيا Mūrītānyā)
- Morocco (Arabic: المغرب al-Maghrib): Berber is the second official language (minority)
- Oman (Arabic: عمان ‘umān)
- Palestine (Arabic: فلسطين Filasṭīn)
- Qatar (Arabic: قطر Qaṭar)
- Saudi Arabia (Arabic: السعودية as-Su‘ūdiyyah)
- Somalia (Arabic: الصومال aṣ-Ṣūmāl): Somali is the first official language
- Sudan (Arabic: السودان as-Sūdān): English is the second official language
- Syria (Arabic: سوريا Sūriyā)
- Tunisia (Arabic: تونس Tūnis)
- United Arab Emirates (Arabic: الإمارات al-ʾimārāt)
- Yemen (Arabic: اليمن al-Yaman)

=== Ancillary linguistic ===
As an alternative to, or in combination with, the standard territorial definition, the Arab world may be defined as consisting of peoples and states united to at least some degree by Arabic language, culture or geographic contiguity, or those states or territories in which the majority of the population speaks Arabic, and thus may also include populations of the Arab diaspora.

When an ancillary linguistic definition is used in combination with the standard territorial definition, various parameters may be applied to determine whether a state or territory should be included in this alternative definition of the Arab world. These parameters may be applied to the states and territories of the Arab League (which constitute the Arab world under the standard definition) and to other states and territories. Typical parameters that may be applied include: whether Arabic is widely spoken; whether Arabic is an official or national language; or whether an Arabic cognate language is widely spoken.

Varieties of Arabic

While Arabic dialects are spoken in a number of Arab League states, Literary Arabic is official in all of them. Several states have declared Arabic to be an official or national language, although Arabic is not as widely spoken there. As members of the Arab League, however, they are considered part of the Arab world under the standard territorial definition.

Somalia's official and national language is Somali while Arabic is recognized as the second language, the same with Somaliland which also recognizes English. Both Arabic and Somali belong to the larger Afro-Asiatic language family. Somali is the most widely used language and contains many Arabic loan words.

Similarly, Djibouti has two official languages, Arabic and French. It also has several formally recognized national languages; besides Somali, many people speak Afar, which is also an Afro-Asiatic language. The majority of the population speaks Somali and Afar, although Arabic is also widely used for trade and other activities.

The Comoros has three official languages: Comorian, Arabic and French. Comorian is the most widely spoken language, with Arabic having a religious significance, and French being associated with the educational system.

Chad, Eritrea and Israel all recognize Arabic as an official or working language, but none of them is a member-state of the Arab League, although both Chad and Eritrea are observer states of the League (with possible future membership) and have large populations of Arabic speakers.

Israel is not a part of the Arab world. By some definitions, Arab citizens of Israel may concurrently be considered a constituent part of the Arab world.

Iran has about 1.5 million Arabic speakers. Iranian Arabs are mainly found in Ahvaz, a southwestern region in the Khuzestan Province; others inhabit the Bushehr and Hormozgan provinces and the city of Qom. Mali and Senegal recognize Hassaniya, the Arabic dialect of the Moorish ethnic minority, as a national language. Greece and Cyprus also recognize Cypriot Maronite Arabic under the European Charter for Regional or Minority Languages. Additionally, Malta, though not part of the Arab world, has as its official language Maltese. The language is grammatically akin to Maghrebi Arabic.

== History ==
=== Early history ===
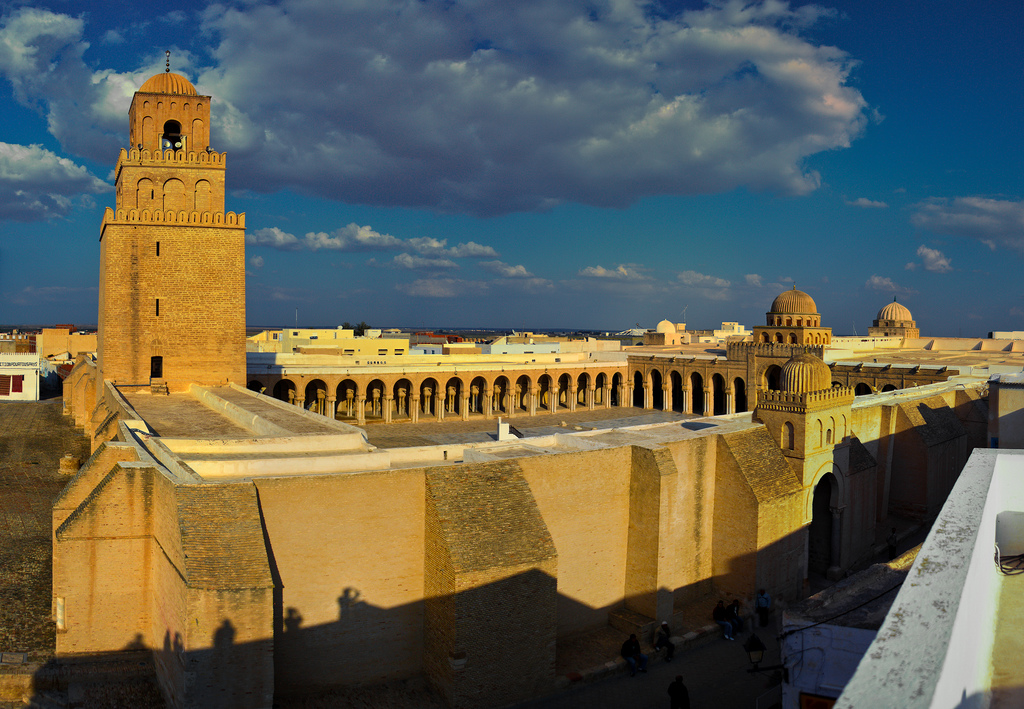
The Great Mosque of Kairouan (also called the Mosque of Uqba) was founded in 670 by the Arab general and conqueror Uqba ibn Nafi. The Great Mosque of Kairouan is located in the historic city of Kairouan in Tunisia.

The Arabs historically originate as a Central Semitic group in the northern Arabian Peninsula, the Southern Levant and the Syrian Desert. Arab tribes and federations included the Nabataeans, Tanukhids, Salihids, Ghassanids.

Arab expansion is due to the early Muslim conquests of the 7th and 8th centuries. Iraq was conquered in 633, Levant (modern Syria, Israel, Palestine, Jordan and Lebanon) was conquered between 636 and 640 CE. Egypt was conquered in 639, and gradually Arabized during the medieval period. A distinctively Egyptian Arabic language emerged by the 16th century. The Maghreb was also conquered in the 7th century, and gradually Arabized under the Fatimids. Islam was brought to Sudan from Egypt during the 8th to 11th centuries. The culture of Sudan today depends on the tribe, some have a pure Nubian, Beja, or Arabic culture and some have a mixture of Arab and Nubian elements.

=== Ottoman and colonial rule ===
The Arab Abbasid Caliphate fell to the Mongol invasions in the 13th century. Egypt, the Levant and Hejaz also came under the Turkish Mamluk Sultanate.

By 1570, the Turkish Ottoman Empire controlled most of the Arab world. However, Morocco remained under the rule of the Zenata Wattasid dynasty, which was succeeded by the Saadi dynasty in the 16th to 17th centuries. The Ajuran Sultanate also held sway in the southern part of the Horn region.

The sentiment of Arab nationalism arose in the second half of the 19th century along with other nationalisms within the declining Ottoman Empire.

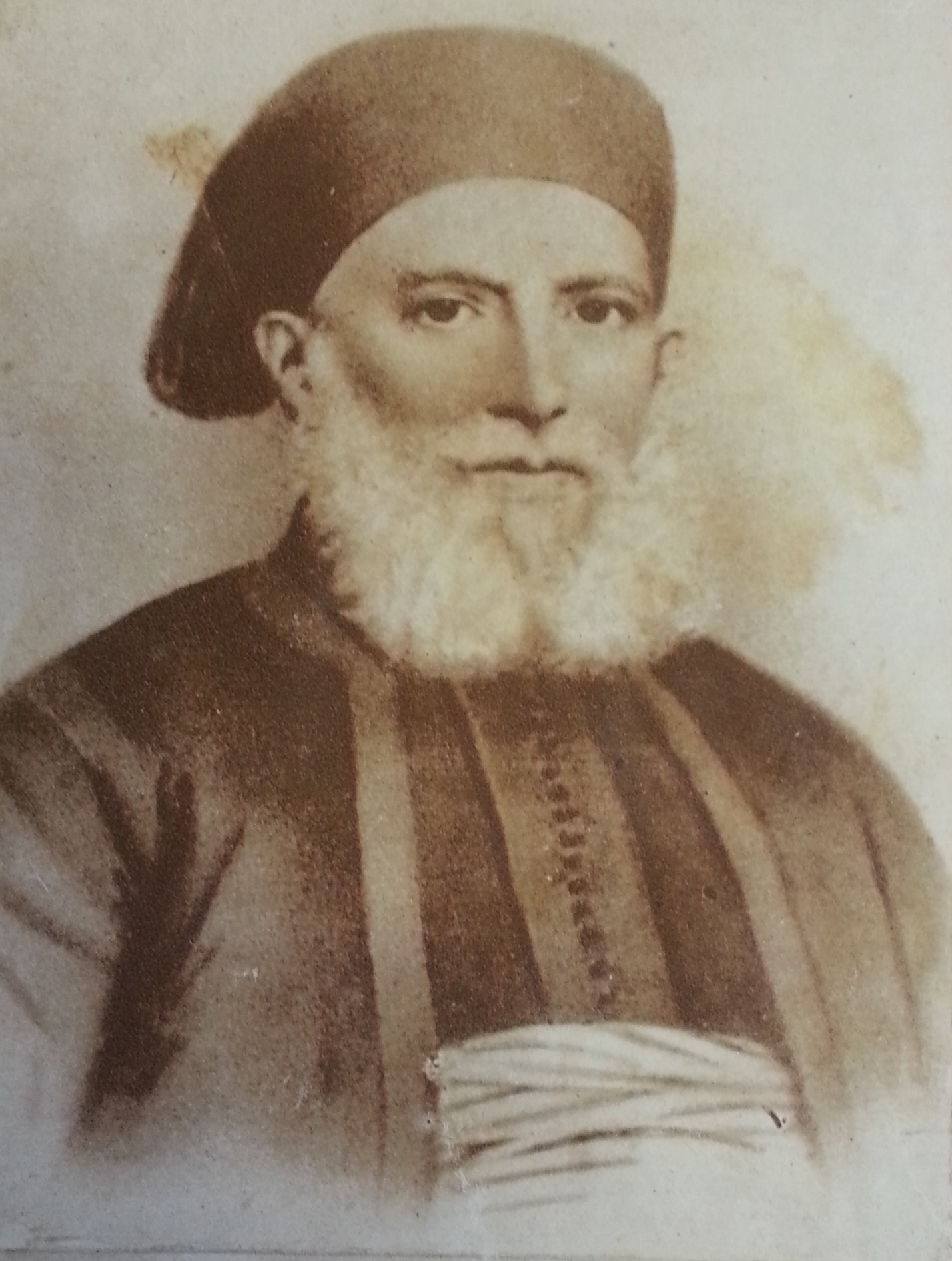
Ibrahim Pasha of Egypt, leader of the Egyptian Army in the Egyptian Ottoman War

When the Ottoman Empire collapsed as a result of World War I, much of the Arab world came to be controlled by the European colonial empires: Mandatory Palestine, Mandatory Iraq, British protectorate of Egypt, French protectorate of Morocco, Italian Libya, French Tunisia, French Algeria, Mandate for Syria and the Lebanon and the so-called Trucial States, a British protectorate formed by the sheikhdoms on the former "Pirate Coast".

These Arab states only gained their independence during or after World War II: the Republic of Lebanon in 1943, the Syrian Arab Republic and the Hashemite Kingdom of Jordan in 1946, the Kingdom of Libya in 1951, the Kingdom of Egypt in 1952, the Kingdom of Morocco and Tunisia in 1956, the Republic of Iraq in 1958, Algeria in 1962, and the United Arab Emirates in 1971.

By contrast, Saudi Arabia had fragmented with the fall of the Ottoman Empire, and was unified under Ibn Saud of Saudi Arabia by 1932.

The Mutawakkilite Kingdom of Yemen also seceded directly from the Ottoman Empire in 1918. Oman, apart from brief intermittent Persian and Portuguese rule, has been self-governing since the 8th century.

=== Rise of Arab nationalism ===
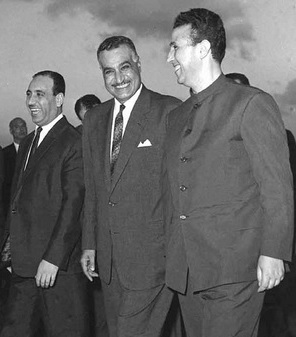
Egyptian president Gamal Abdel Nasser (center) receiving Algerian president Ahmed Ben Bella (right) and Iraqi president Abdel Salam Arif (left) for the Arab League summit in Alexandria, September 1964

The Arab League was formed in 1945 to represent the interests of the Arabs, and especially to pursue the political unification of the Arab world, a project known as Pan-Arabism. There were some short-lived attempts at such unification in the mid-20th century, notably the United Arab Republic of 1958 to 1961. The Arab League's main goal is to unify politically the Arab populations so defined. Its permanent headquarters are located in Cairo. However, it was moved temporarily to Tunis during the 1980s, after Egypt was expelled for signing the Camp David Accords (1978).

Pan-Arabism has mostly been abandoned as an ideology since the 1980s, and was replaced by Pan-Islamism on one hand, and individual nationalisms on the other.

=== Modern conflicts ===
==== Unification of Saudi Arabia ====
The unification of Saudi Arabia was a 30-year-long military and political campaign, by which the various tribes, sheikhdoms, and emirates of most of the Arabian Peninsula were conquered by the House of Saud, or Al Saud, between 1902 and 1932, when the modern-day Kingdom of Saudi Arabia was proclaimed. Carried out under the charismatic Abdul Aziz Ibn Saud, this process created what is sometimes referred to as the Third Saudi State, to differentiate it from the first and second states that existed under the Al Saud clan.

The Al-Saud had been in exile in Ottoman Iraq since 1893 following the disintegration of the Second Saudi State and the rise of Jebel Shammar under the Al Rashid clan. In 1902, Ibn Saud recaptured Riyadh, the Al Saud dynasty's former capital. He went on to subdue the rest of Nejd, Al-Hasa, Jebel Shammar, Asir, and Hejaz (location of the Muslim holy cities of Mecca and Medina) between 1913 and 1926. The resultant polity was named the Kingdom of Nejd and Hejaz from 1927 until it was further consolidated with Al-Hasa and Qatif into the Kingdom of Saudi Arabia in 1932.

==== Arab–Israeli conflict ====
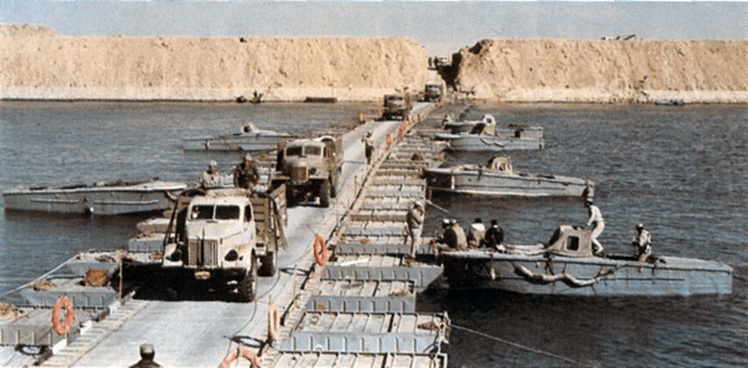
Egyptian vehicles crossing the Suez Canal on October 7, 1973, during the Yom Kippur War

The establishment of the State of Israel in 1948 has given rise to the Arab–Israeli conflict, one of the major unresolved geopolitical conflicts.

The Arab states in changing alliances were involved in a number of wars with Israel and its western allies between 1948 and 1973, including the 1948 Arab–Israeli War, the 1956 Suez Crisis, the Six-Day War of 1967, and the Yom Kippur War of 1973. An Egypt–Israel peace treaty was signed in 1979.

==== Iran–Iraq War ====
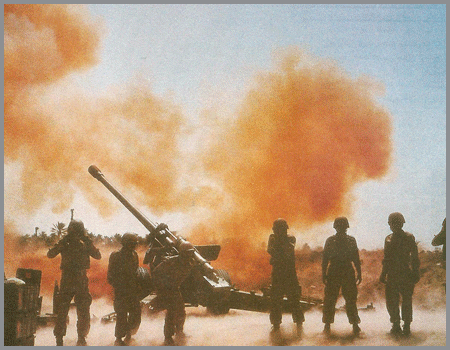
The Iran–Iraq War (1980–1988) killed more than 500,000 people before a UN-brokered ceasefire ended it.

The Iran–Iraq War (also known as the First Gulf War and by various other names) was an armed conflict between the armed forces of Iraq and Iran, lasting from September 1980 to August 1988, making it the second longest conventional war of the 20th century. It was initially referred to in English as the "Gulf War" prior to the "Gulf War" of 1990.

The war began when Iraq invaded Iran, launching a simultaneous invasion by air and land into Iranian territory on 22 September 1980 following a long history of border disputes, and fears of Shia Islam insurgency among Iraq's long-suppressed Shia majority influenced by the Iranian Revolution. Iraq was also aiming to replace Iran as the dominant Persian Gulf state. Although Iraq hoped to take advantage of the revolutionary chaos in Iran (see Iranian Revolution, 1979) and attacked without formal warning, they made only limited progress into Iran and were quickly repelled by the Iranians who regained virtually all lost territory by June 1982. For the next six years, Iran was on the offensive.

==== Lebanese Civil War ====
The Lebanese Civil War was a multifaceted civil war in Lebanon, lasting from 1975 to 1990 and resulting in an estimated 120,000 fatalities. Another one million people (a quarter of the population) were wounded, and today approximately 76,000 people remain displaced within Lebanon. There was also a mass exodus of almost one million people from Lebanon.

==== Western Sahara conflict ====
The Western Sahara War was an armed struggle between the Sahrawi Polisario Front and Morocco between 1975 and 1991, being the most significant phase of the Western Sahara conflict. The conflict erupted after the withdrawal of Spain from the Spanish Sahara in accordance with the Madrid Accords, by which it transferred administrative control of the territory to Morocco and Mauritania, but not the sovereignty. In 1975, Moroccan government organized the Green March of some 350,000 Moroccan citizens, escorted by around 20,000 troops, who entered Western Sahara, trying to establish Moroccan presence.

While at first met with just minor resistance by the Polisario, Morocco later engaged a long period of guerilla warfare with the Sahrawi nationalists. During the late 1970s, the Polisario Front, desiring to establish an independent state in the territory, successively fought both Mauritania and Morocco. In 1979, Mauritania withdrew from the conflict after signing a peace treaty with the Polisario. The war continued in low intensity throughout the 1980s, though Morocco made several attempts to take the upper hand in 1989–1991. A cease-fire agreement was finally reached between the Polisario Front and Morocco in September 1991.

==== North Yemen Civil War ====
The North Yemen Civil War was fought in North Yemen between royalists of the Mutawakkilite Kingdom of Yemen and factions of the Yemen Arab Republic from 1962 to 1970. The war began with a coup d'état carried out by the republican leader, Abdullah as-Sallal, which dethroned the newly crowned Imam al-Badr and declared Yemen a republic under his presidency. The Imam escaped to the Saudi Arabian border and rallied popular support.

==== Arab Spring ====
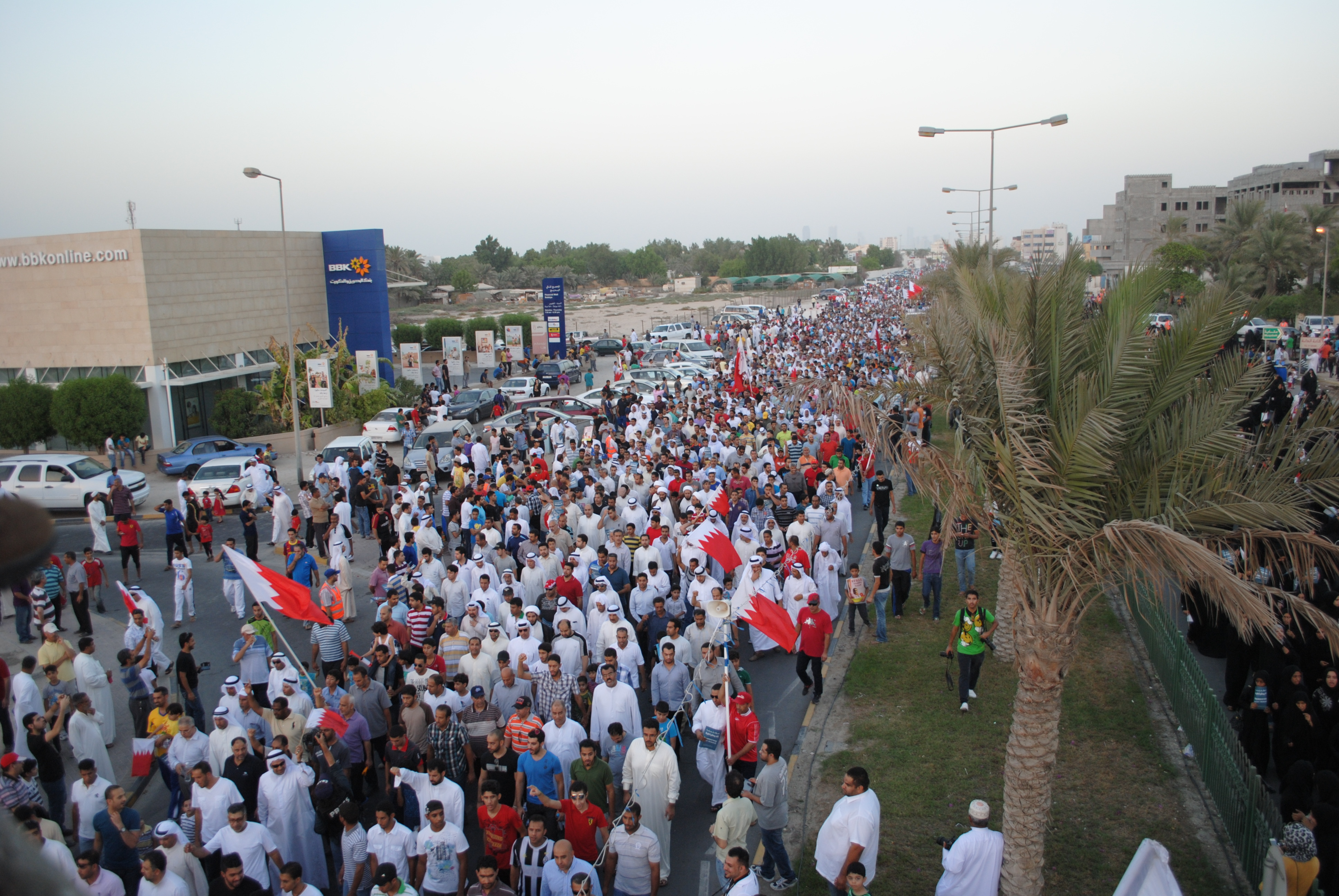
2011 Bahraini uprising

The popular protests throughout the Arab world of late 2010 to the present have been directed against authoritarian leadership and associated political corruption, paired with demands for more democratic rights. The two most violent and prolonged conflicts in the aftermath of the Arab Spring are the Libyan Civil War and Syrian Civil War.

=== Petroleum ===
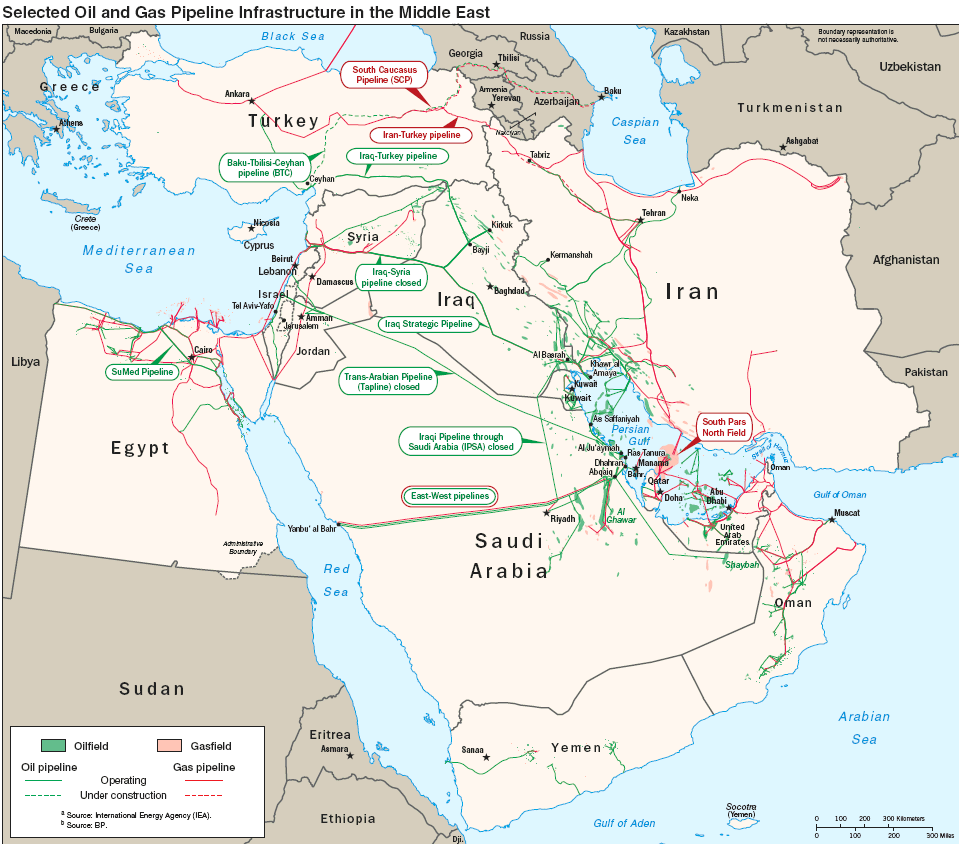
Oil and gas pipelines and fields

While the Arab world had been of limited interest to the European colonial powers, the British Empire being mostly interested in the Suez Canal as a route to British India, the economic and geopolitical situation changed dramatically after the discovery of large petroleum deposits in the 1930s, coupled with the vastly increased demand for petroleum in the west as a result of the Second Industrial Revolution.

The Persian Gulf is particularly well-endowed with this strategic raw material: five Persian Gulf states, Saudi Arabia, Iraq, the UAE, Kuwait, and Qatar, are among the top ten petroleum or gas exporters worldwide. In Africa, Algeria (10th world) and Libya are important gas exporters. Bahrain, Egypt, Tunisia, and Sudan all have smaller but significant reserves. Where present, these have had significant effects on regional politics, often enabling rentier states, leading to economic disparities between oil-rich and oil-poor countries, and, particularly in the more sparsely populated states of the Persian Gulf and Libya, triggering extensive labor immigration. It is believed that the Arab world holds approximately 46% of the world's total proven oil reserves and a quarter of the world's natural-gas reserves.

Islamism and Pan-Islamism were on the rise during the 1980s. The Hezbollah, a militant Islamic party in Lebanon, was founded in 1982. Islamic terrorism became a problem in the Arab world in the 1970s to 1980s. While the Muslim Brotherhood had been active in Egypt since 1928, their militant actions were limited to assassination attempts on political leaders.

=== Recent history ===
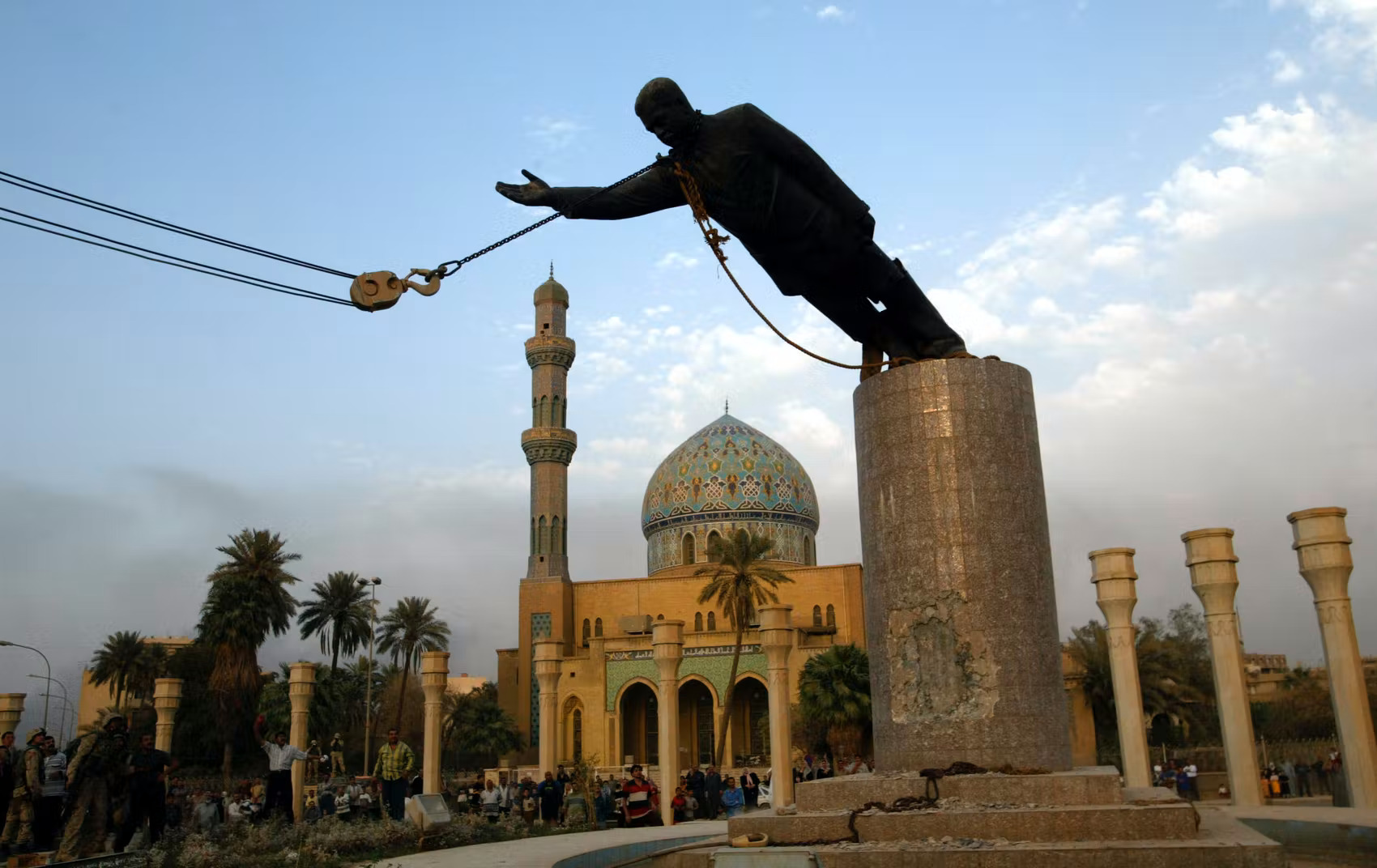
The toppling of Saddam Hussein's statue in Firdos Square in Baghdad shortly after the American invasion of Iraq in 2003

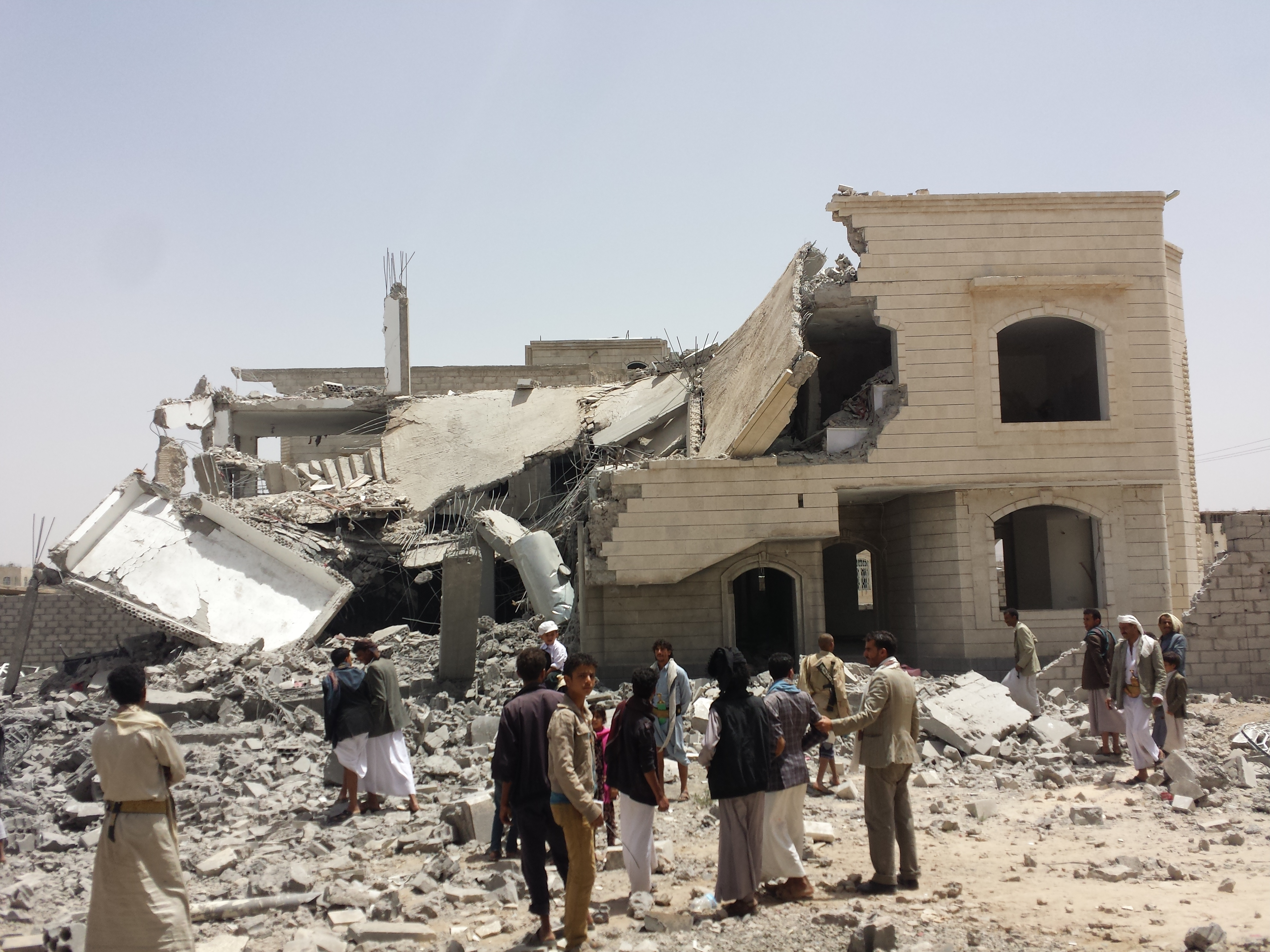
Saudi Arabian-led airstrikes in Yemen, June 2015

Today, Arab states are characterized by their autocratic rulers and lack of democratic control. The 2016 Democracy Index classifies Lebanon, Iraq and Palestine as "hybrid regimes", Tunisia as a "flawed democracy" and all other Arab states as "authoritarian regimes". Similarly, the 2011 Freedom House report classifies the Comoros and Mauritania as "electoral democracies", Lebanon, Kuwait and Morocco as "partly free", and all other Arab states as "not free".

The invasion of Kuwait by Iraq forces, led to the 1990–91 Persian Gulf War. Egypt, Syria and Saudi Arabia joined a multinational coalition that opposed Iraq. Displays of support for Iraq by Jordan and Palestine resulted in strained relations between many of the Arab states. After the war, a so-called "Damascus Declaration" formalized an alliance for future joint Arab defensive actions between Egypt, Syria, and the GCC states.

A chain of events leading to the destabilization of the authoritarian regimes established during the 1950s throughout the Arab world became apparent during the early years of the 21st century. The 2003 U.S. invasion of Iraq led to the collapse of the Baathist regime and ultimate execution of Saddam Hussein.

A growing class of young, educated, secular citizens with access to modern media such as Al Jazeera (since 1996) and communicating via the internet began to form a third force besides the classical dichotomy of Pan-Arabism vs. Pan-Islamism that had dominated the second half of the 20th century. These citizens wish for reform in their country's religious institutions.

In Syria, the Damascus Spring of 2000 to 2001 heralded the possibility of democratic change, but the Baathist regime managed to suppress the movement.

In 2003, the Egyptian Movement for Change, popularly known as Kefaya, was launched to oppose the Mubarak regime and to establish democratic reforms and greater civil liberties in Egypt.

== Geography ==
The Arab World stretches across more than 13,000,000 square kilometres (5,000,000 sq mi) of North Africa and the part of North-East Africa and South-West Asia. The eastern part of the Arab world is called the Mashriq. Algeria, Morocco, Tunisia, Libya and Mauritania are the Maghreb or Maghrib.

The Maghreb

The Mashriq

The term "Arab" often connotes the Arabian Peninsula, but the larger (and more populous) part of the Arab World is North Africa. Its eight million square kilometers include two of the largest countries of the African continent, Algeria (2.4 million km^{2}) in the center of the region and Sudan (1.9 million km^{2}) in the southeast. Algeria is about three-quarters the size of India, or about one-and-a-half times the size of Alaska, the largest state in the United States. The largest country in the Arab West Asia is Saudi Arabia (2 million km^{2}).

At the other extreme, the smallest autonomous mainland Arab country is Lebanon (10,452 km^{2}), and the smallest island Arab country is Bahrain (665 km^{2}).

Every Arab country borders a sea or ocean, with the exception of the Arab region of northern Chad, which is completely landlocked. Iraq is actually nearly landlocked, as it has only a very narrow access to the Persian Gulf.

=== Historical boundaries ===
The political borders of the Arab world have wandered, leaving Arab minorities in non-Arab countries of the Sahel and the Horn of Africa as well as in the West Asian countries of Cyprus, Turkey and Iran, and also leaving non-Arab minorities in Arab countries. However, the basic geography of sea, desert and mountain provides the enduring natural boundaries for this region.

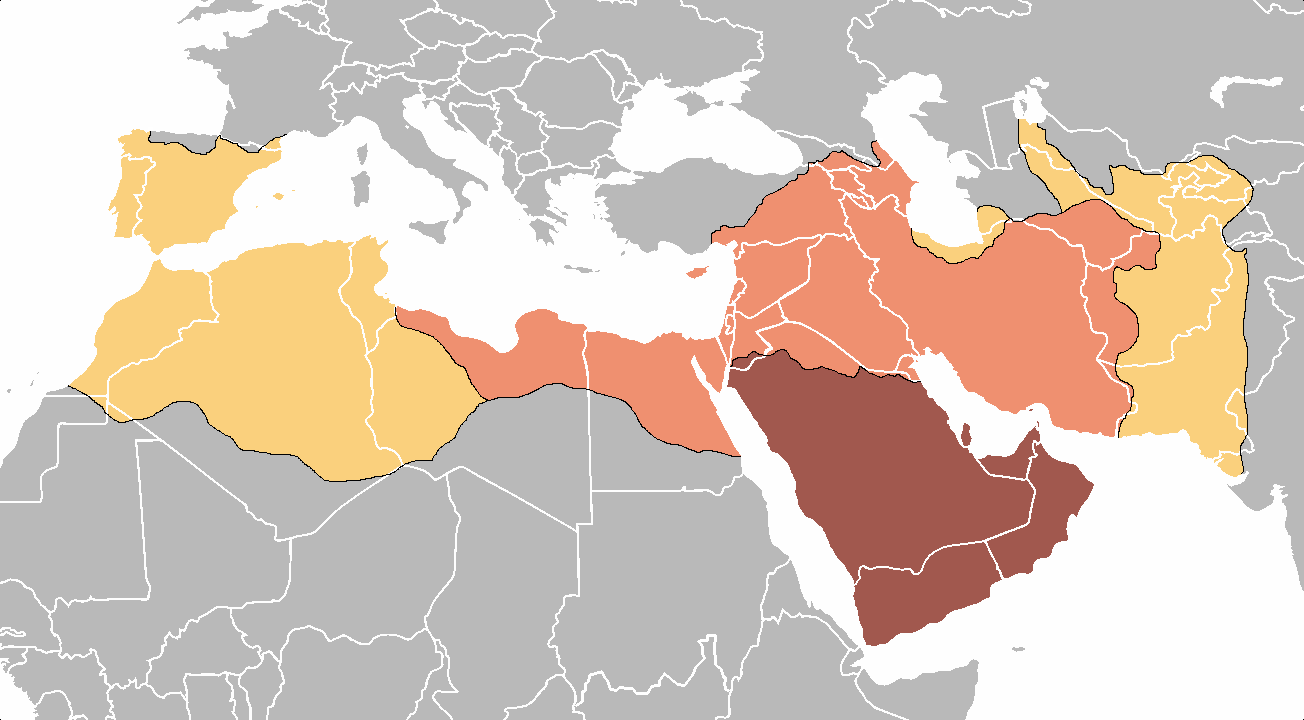
Map of the caliphate's expansion: Expansion under Muhammad, 622–632 Expansion during the Rashidun Caliphate, 632–661 Expansion during the Umayyad Caliphate, 661–750

The Arab world straddles two continents, Africa and Asia. It is mainly oriented along an east–west axis.

The West Asian Arab region comprises the Arabian Peninsula, most of the Levant (excluding Cyprus and Israel), most of Mesopotamia (excluding parts of Turkey and Iran) and the Persian Gulf region. The peninsula is roughly a tilted rectangle that leans back against the slope of northeast Africa, the long axis pointing toward Turkey and Europe.

Arab North Africa comprises the entire northern third of the continent. It is surrounded by water on three sides (west, north, and east) and desert or desert scrubland on the fourth (south).

In the west, it is bounded by the shores of the Atlantic Ocean. From northeast to southwest, Morocco, Western Sahara (mostly unilaterally annexed by Morocco), and Mauritania make up the roughly 2,000 kilometers of Arab Atlantic coastline. The southwestern sweep of the coast is gentle but substantial, such that Mauritania's capital, Nouakchott (18°N, 16°W), is far enough west to share longitude with Iceland (13–22°W). Nouakchott is the westernmost capital of the Arab World and the third-westernmost in Africa, and sits on the Atlantic fringe of the southwestern Sahara. Next south along the coast from Mauritania is Senegal, whose abrupt border belies the gradient in culture from Arab to indigenous African that historically characterizes this part of West Africa.

Arab Africa's boundary to the north is again a continental boundary, the Mediterranean Sea. This boundary begins in the west with the narrow Strait of Gibraltar, the thirteen kilometer wide channel that connects the Mediterranean with the Atlantic to the west, and separates Morocco from Spain to the north. East along the coast from Morocco are Algeria, Tunisia, and Libya, followed by Egypt, which forms the region's, and the continent's, northeastern corner. The coast turns briefly but sharply south at Tunisia, slopes more gently southeastward through the Libyan capital of Tripoli, and bumps north through Libya's second city, Benghazi, before turning straight east again through Egypt's second city, Alexandria, at the mouth of the Nile. Along with the spine of Italy to its north, Tunisia marks the junction of western and eastern Mediterranean, and a cultural transition as well: west of Egypt begins the region of the Arab World known as the Maghreb include (Libya, Tunisia, Algeria, Morocco and Mauritania).

Historically the 4,000-kilometer Mediterranean boundary has fluttered. Population centers north of it in Europe have invited contact and Arab exploration—mostly friendly, though sometimes not. Islands and peninsulas near the Arab coast have changed hands. The islands of Sicily and Malta lie just a hundred kilometers east of the Tunisian city of Carthage, which has been a point of contact with Europe since its founding in the first millennium BCE; both Sicily and Malta at times have been part of the Arab World. Just across the Strait of Gibraltar from Morocco, regions of the Iberian peninsula were part of the Arab World throughout the Middle Ages, extending the northern boundary at times to the foothills of the Pyrenees and leaving a substantial mark on local and wider European and Western culture.

The northern boundary of the African Arab world has also fluttered briefly in the other direction, first through the Crusades and later through the imperial involvement of France, Britain, Spain, and Italy. Another visitor from northern shores, Turkey, controlled the east of the region for centuries, though not as a colonizer. Spain still maintains two small enclaves, Ceuta and Melilla (called "Morocco Espanol"), along the otherwise Moroccan coast. Overall this wave has ebbed, though like the Arab expansion north it has left its mark. The proximity of North Africa to Europe has always encouraged interaction, and this continues with Arab immigration to Europe and European interest in the Arab countries today. However, population centers and the physical fact of the sea keeps this boundary of the Arab World settled on the Mediterranean coastline.

To the east, the Red Sea defines the boundary between Africa and Asia, and thus also between Arab Africa and Arab West Asia. This sea is a long and narrow waterway with a northwest tilt, stretching 2,300 kilometers from Egypt's Sinai Peninsula southeast to the Bab al-Mandab Strait between Djibouti in Africa and Yemen in Arabia but on average just 150 kilometers wide. Though the sea is navigable along its length, historically much contact between Arab Africa and Arab West Asia has been either overland across the Sinai or by sea across the Mediterranean or the narrow Bab al-Mandab strait. From northwest to southeast, Egypt, Sudan, and Eritrea form the African coastline, with Djibouti marking Bab al-Mendab's African shore.

Southeast along the coast from Djibouti is Somalia, but the Somali coast soon makes a 90-degree turn and heads northeast, mirroring a bend in the coast of Yemen across the water to the north and defining the south coast of the Gulf of Aden. The Somali coast then takes a hairpin turn back southwest to complete the horn of Africa. For six months of the year the monsoon winds blow from up equatorial Somalia, past Arabia and over the small Yemeni archipelago of Socotra, to rain on India. They then switch directions and blow back.

The east- and especially southeast-coast boundary of Arab Africa has historically been a gateway for maritime trade and cultural exchange with both East Africa and the subcontinent. The trade winds help explain the presence of the Comoros islands, an Arab-African country, off the coast of Mozambique, near Madagascar in the Indian Ocean, the southernmost part of the Arab World.

The southern boundary of Arab North Africa is the strip of scrubland known as the Sahel that crosses the continent south of the Sahara.

== States and territories ==
For the states and territories constituting the Arab world, see definition above.

=== Forms of government ===
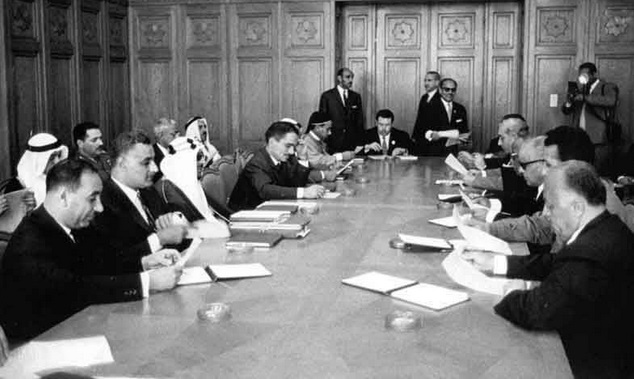
Arab leaders during the first Arab league summit in Cairo (1964)

Different forms of government are represented in the Arab World: Some of the countries are monarchies: Bahrain, Jordan, Kuwait, Morocco, Oman, Qatar, Saudi Arabia and the United Arab Emirates. The other Arab countries are all republics. With the exception of Lebanon, Tunisia, Iraq, Palestine, and recently Mauritania, democratic elections throughout the Arab World are generally viewed as compromised, due to outright vote rigging, intimidation of opposition parties, and severe restraints on civil liberties and political dissent.

After World War II, Pan-Arabism sought to unite all Arabic-speaking countries into one political entity. Only Syria, Iraq, Egypt, Sudan, Tunisia, Libya and North Yemen considered the short-lived unification of the United Arab Republic. Historical divisions, competing local nationalisms, and geographical sprawl were major reasons for the failure of Pan-Arabism. Arab Nationalism was another strong force in the region which peaked during the mid-20th century and was professed by many leaders in Egypt, Algeria, Libya, Syria, and Iraq. Arab Nationalist leaders of this period included Gamal Abdel Nasser of Egypt, Ahmed Ben Bella of Algeria, Michel Aflaq, Salah al-Din al-Bitar, Zaki al-Arsuzi, Constantin Zureiq and Shukri al-Kuwatli of Syria, Ahmed Hassan al-Bakr of Iraq, Habib Bourguiba of Tunisia, Mehdi Ben Barka of Morocco, and Shakib Arslan of Lebanon.

Later and current Arab Nationalist leaders include Muammar al-Gaddafi of Libya, Hafez al-Assad and Bashar al-Assad of Syria. The diverse Arab states generally maintained close ties but distinct national identities developed and strengthened with the social, historical and political realities of the past 60 years. This has made the idea of a pan-Arab nation-state increasingly less feasible and likely. Additionally, an upsurge in political Islam has since led to a greater emphasis on pan-Islamic rather than pan-Arab identity amongst some Arab Muslims. Arab nationalists who once opposed Islamic movements as a threat to their power, now deal with them differently for reasons of political reality.

=== Modern boundaries ===
Many of the modern borders of the Arab World were drawn by European imperial powers during the 19th and early 20th century. However, some of the larger states (in particular Egypt and Syria) have historically maintained geographically definable boundaries, on which some of the modern states are roughly based. The 14th-century Egyptian historian Al-Maqrizi, for instance, defines Egypt's boundaries as extending from the Mediterranean in the north to lower Nubia in the south; and between the Red Sea in the east and the oases of the Western/Libyan Desert. The modern borders of Egypt, therefore, are not a creation of European powers, and are at least in part based on historically definable entities which are in turn based on certain cultural and ethnic identifications.

At other times, kings, emirs or sheikhs were placed as semi-autonomous rulers over the newly created nation states, usually chosen by the same imperial powers that for some drew the new borders, for services rendered to European powers like the British Empire, e.g. Sherif Hussein ibn Ali. Many African states did not attain independence until the 1960s from France after bloody insurgencies for their freedom. These struggles were settled by the imperial powers approving the form of independence given, so as a consequence almost all of these borders have remained. Some of these borders were agreed upon without consultation of those individuals that had served the colonial interests of Britain or France. One such agreement solely between Britain and France (to the exclusion of Sherif Hussein ibn Ali), signed in total secrecy until Lenin released the full text, was the Sykes-Picot Agreement. Another influential document written without the consensus of the local population was the Balfour Declaration.

As former director of the Israeli intelligence agency Mossad, Efraim Halevy, now a director at the Hebrew University said,

The borders, which if you look on the maps of the middle-east are very straight lines, were drawn by British and French draftsmen who sat with maps and drew the lines of the frontiers with rulers. If the ruler for some reason or other moved on the map, because of some person's hand shaking, then the frontier moved (with the hand).

He went on to give an example,

There was a famous story about a British consul, a lady named Gertrude Bell who drew the map between Iraq and Jordan, using transparent paper. She turned to talk to somebody and as she was turning the paper moved and the ruler moved and that added considerable territory to the (new) Jordanians.

Historian Jim Crow, of Newcastle University, has said:

Without that imperial carve-up, Iraq would not be in the state it is in today...Gertrude Bell was one of two or three Britons who were instrumental in the creation of the Arab states in the Middle East that were favourable to Britain.

=== Modern economies ===
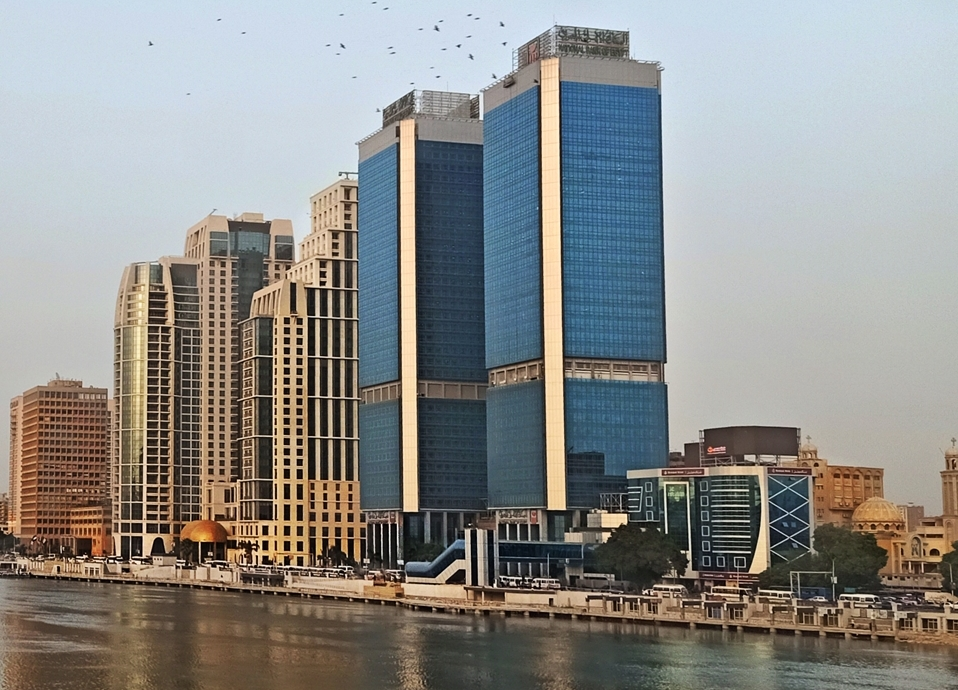
Cairo, the capital of Egypt

As of 2006, the Arab world accounts for two-fifths of the gross domestic product and three-fifths of the trade of the wider Muslim world.

The Arab states are mostly, although not exclusively, developing economies and derive their export revenues from oil and gas, or the sale of other raw materials. Recent years have seen significant economic growth in the Arab World, due largely to an increase in oil and gas prices, which tripled between 2001 and 2006, but also due to efforts by some states to diversify their economic base. Industrial production has risen, for example the amount of steel produced between 2004 and 2005 rose from 8.4 to 19 million tonnes. (Source: Opening speech of Mahmoud Khoudri, Algeria's Industry Minister, at the 37th General Assembly of the Iron & Steel Arab Union, Algiers, May 2006). However even 19 million tons pa still only represents 1.7% of global steel production, and remains inferior to the production of countries like Brazil.

The main economic organisations in the Arab World are the Gulf Cooperation Council (GCC), comprising the states in the Persian Gulf, and the Union of the Arab Maghreb (UMA), made up of North African States. The GCC has achieved some success in financial and monetary terms, including plans to establish a common currency in the Persian Gulf region. Since its foundation in 1989, the UMA's most significant accomplishment has been the establishment of a 7,000 km highway crossing North Africa from Mauritania to Libya's border with Egypt. The central stretch of the highway, expected to be completed in 2010, will cross Morocco, Algeria and Tunisia. In recent years a new term has been coined to define a greater economic region: the MENA region, standing for "Middle East and North Africa", is becoming increasingly popular, especially with support from the current US administration.

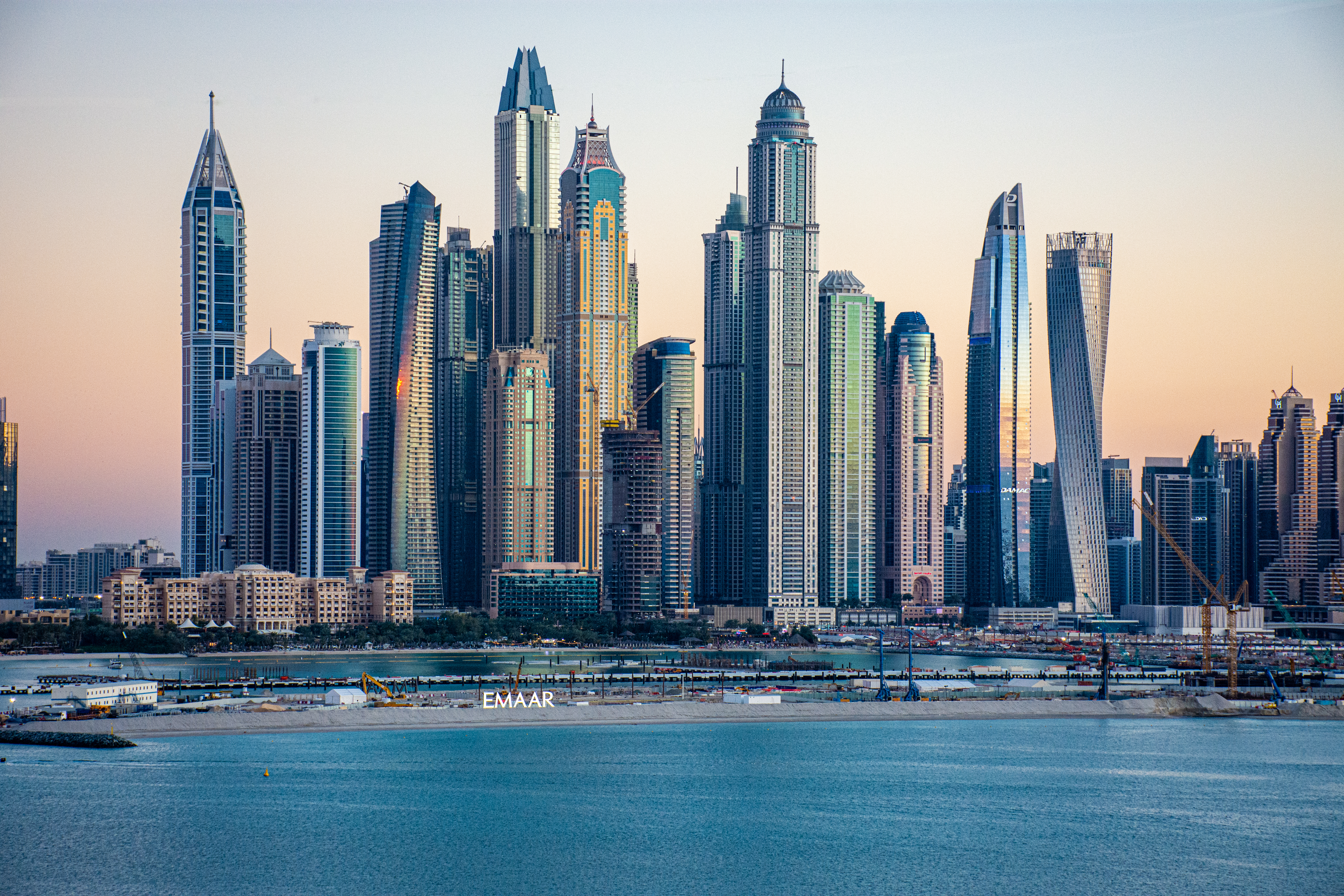
The Emirate of Dubai is one of the seven emirates of the United Arab Emirates.

As of August 2009 it was reported that Saudi Arabia is the strongest Arab economy according to World Bank.

Saudi Arabia remains the top Arab economy in terms of total GDP. It is Asia's eleventh largest economy, followed by Egypt and Algeria, which were the second and third largest economies in Africa, after South Africa, in 2006. In terms of GDP per capita, Qatar is the richest developing country in the world.

The total GDP of all Arab countries in 1999 was US$531.2 billion. The total Arab world GDP was estimated to be worth at least $2.8 trillion in 2011. This is only smaller than the GDP of the US, China, Japan and Germany.

== Demographics ==
In the Arab world, Modern Standard Arabic, derived from Classical Arabic (symptomatic of Arabic diglossia), serves as an official language in the Arab League states, and Arabic dialects are used as lingua franca. Various indigenous languages are also spoken, which predate the spread of the Arabic language. This contrasts with the situation in the wider Islamic world, where, in contiguous Iran, Pakistan and Afghanistan, the Perso-Arabic script is used and Arabic is the primary liturgical language, but the tongue is not official at the state level or spoken as a vernacular. Arabs constitute around one quarter of the 1.5 billion Muslims in the Islamic world.

=== Largest cities ===
Table of largest cities in the Arab world by official city propers:

Rank	Country	City	Population	Founding date	Image
1	Egypt	Cairo	22,623,874	968 CE	
2	Iraq	Baghdad	8,126,755	762 CE	
3	Saudi Arabia	Riyadh	7,676,654	1746 CE	
4	Egypt	Alexandria	5,381,000	332 BCE	
5	Jordan	Amman	4,642,000	7250 BCE	
6	Algeria	Algiers	4,515,000	944 CE	
7	Saudi Arabia	Jeddah	4,276,000	522 BCE	
8	Morocco	Casablanca	3,359,818	7th century	
9	Yemen	Sanaa	3,292,497	~500 BCE (possibly earlier)	
10	United Arab Emirates	Dubai	3,287,007	1833 CE	

=== Religion ===
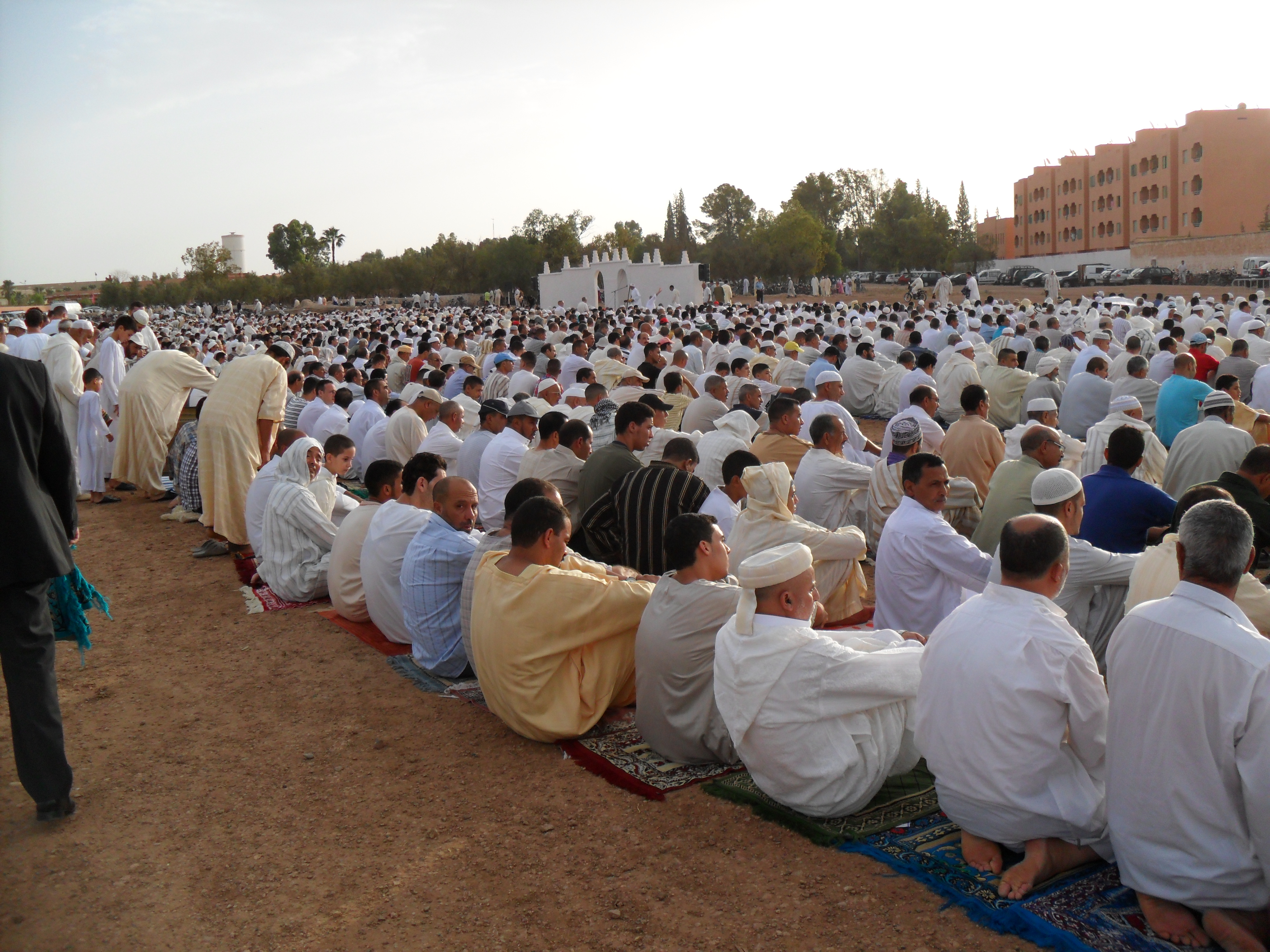
Eid al-Fitr mass prayer in Morocco

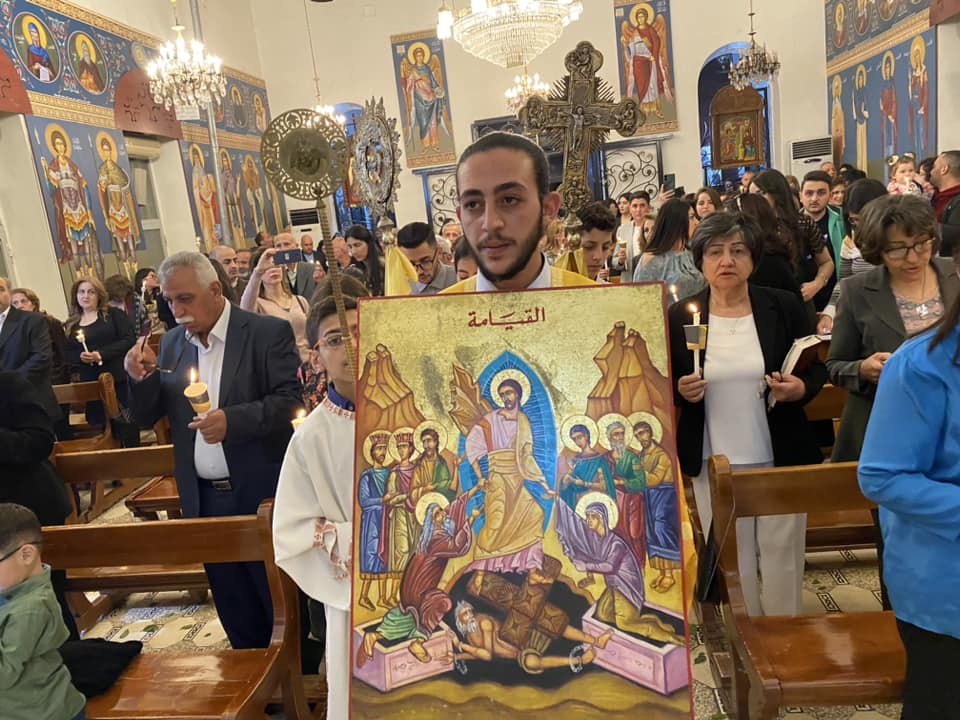
Easter celebrations in Syria

Most Arab countries are Muslim-majority, and Islam has official status in many of them. Sharia plays a significant role in personal-status or family law in several Arab states, while other states rely more heavily on secular legal codes. The majority of the Arab countries adhere to Sunni Islam. Iraq and Bahrain, however, are Shia majority countries, while Lebanon, Yemen, and Kuwait have large Shia minorities. In Saudi Arabia, Ismailite pockets are also found in the eastern Al-Hasa region and the southern city of Najran. Ibadi Islam is practiced in Oman, where Ibadis constitute around 75% of Muslims.

There are also Christian adherents in the Arab world, particularly in Egypt, Syria, Lebanon, Iraq, Jordan, and Palestine. Small native Christian communities can be found also throughout the Arabian Peninsula and North Africa. Coptic, Maronite and Assyrian Christian enclaves exist in the Nile Valley, Levant and northern Iraq respectively. There are also Assyrian, Armenian and Arab Christians throughout Iraq, Syria, Palestine, Lebanon and Jordan, with Aramean communities in Maaloula and Jubb'adin in Syria. There are also native Arab Christian communities in Algeria, Bahrain, Morocco, Kuwait and Tunisia.

Smaller ethno-religious minorities across the Arab League include the Yezidis, Yarsan and Shabaks (mainly in Iraq), the Druzes (mainly in Syria and also in Lebanon, Jordan) and Mandaeans (in Iraq). Formerly, there were significant minorities of Jews throughout the Arab World. However, the Arab–Israeli conflict prompted their mass exodus between 1948 and 1972. Today small Jewish communities remain, ranging anywhere from just 10 in Bahrain, to more than 400 in Iraq and Syria, 1,000 in Tunisia and some 3,000 in Morocco.

=== Education ===
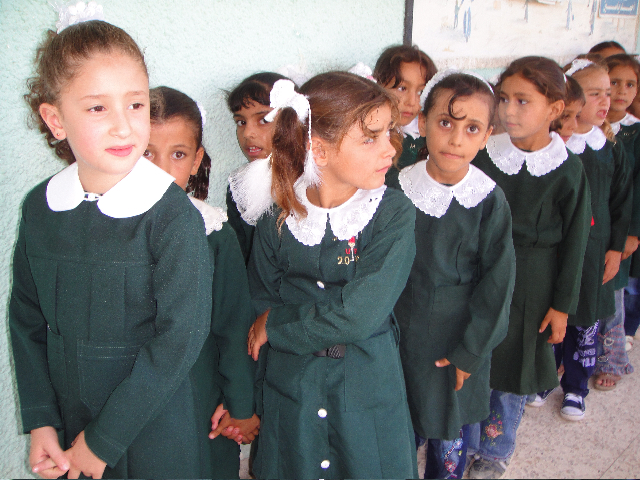
Palestinian schoolgirls in Gaza lining up for class, 2009

According to UNESCO, the average rate of adult literacy (ages 15 and older) in this region is 78%. In Mauritania the rate is lower than the average, at less than 50%. Bahrain, Palestine, Kuwait, Qatar, and Jordan record a high adult literacy rate of over 95%. The average rate of adult literacy shows steady improvement, and the absolute number of adult illiterates fell from 64 million to around 58 million between 1990 and 2000–2004.

Overall, the gender disparity in adult literacy is high in this region, and of the illiteracy rate, women account for two-thirds, with only 69 literate women for every 100 literate men. The average GPI (Gender Parity Index) for adult literacy is 0.72, and gender disparity can be observed in Egypt, Morocco, and Yemen. Above all, the GPI of Yemen is only 0.46 in a 53% adult literacy rate.

Literacy rate is higher among the youth than adults. Youth literacy rate (ages 15–24) in the Arab region increased from 63.9 to 76.3% from 1990 to 2002. The average rate of GCC states was 94%, followed by the Maghreb at 83.2% and the Mashriq at 73.6%.

The United Nations published an Arab human development report in 2002, 2003 and 2004. These reports, written by researchers from the Arab world, address some sensitive issues in the development of Arab countries: women empowerment, availability of education and information among others.

=== Gender equality and women's rights ===
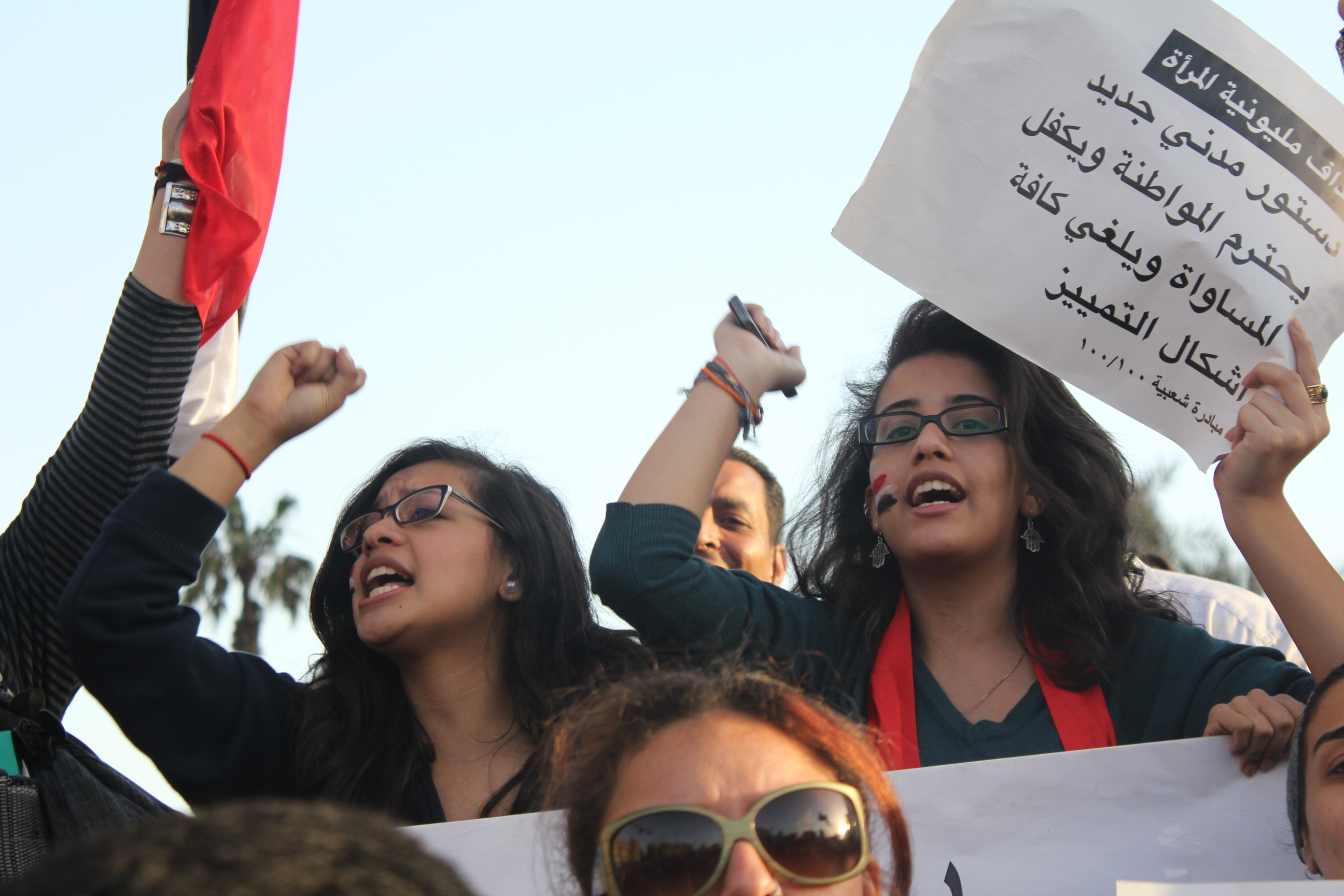
A women's rights protest in Egypt, 2011

Women in the Arab world are still denied equality of opportunity, although their disenfranchisement is a critical factor crippling the Arab nations' quest to return to the first rank of global leaders in commerce, learning and culture, according to a United Nations-sponsored report in 2008.

=== Film industry ===
There is no single description of Arab cinema since it includes films from various countries and cultures of the Arab world and therefore does not have one form, structure, or style. In its inception, Arab cinema was mostly an imitation of Western cinema. However, it has and continues to constantly change and evolve. It mostly includes films made in Egypt, Lebanon, Syria, Iraq, Kuwait, Algeria, Morocco, and Tunisia. Egypt is a pioneer in the field, but each country in the region has its own unique cinema.

Elsewhere in West Asia and North Africa, film production was scarce until the late 1960s and early 1970s when filmmakers began to receive funding and financial assistance from state organizations. This was during the post-independence and is when most Arab cinema took root. Most films produced at that time were funded by the state and contained a nationalistic dimension. These films helped to advance certain social causes such as independence, and other social, economic and political agendas.

A sustained film industry was able to emerge in Egypt when other parts of the Arab world had only been able to sporadically produce feature-length films due to limited financing.

Arabic cinema is dominated by films from Egypt. Three quarters of all Arab movies are produced in Egypt. According to film critic and historian Roy Armes, the cinema of Lebanon is the only other in the Arabic-speaking region, beside Egypt's, that could amount to a national cinema.

While Egyptian and Lebanese cinema have a long history of production, most other Arab countries did not witness film production until after independence, and even today, the majority of film production in countries like Bahrain, Libya, Saudi Arabia, Sudan, and the United Arab Emirates is limited to television or short films.

There is increased interest in films originating in the Arab world. For example, films from Algeria, Lebanon, Morocco, Palestine, Syria and Tunisia are making wider and more frequent rounds than ever before in local film festivals and repertoire theaters.

Arab cinema has explored many topics from politics, colonialism, tradition, modernity and social taboos. It has also attempted to escape from its earlier tendency to mimic and rely on Western film devices. In fact, colonization did not only influence Arab films, but it also had an impact on Arab movies theaters. Apart from the history of Arab cinema, recently the portrayal of women became an important aspect in the production of Arab cinema. Arab women shaped a great portion of the film industry in the Arab world by employing their cinematic talents in improving the production of Arab films.

The production of Arab cinema has declined in the last decades and many filmmakers in the Middle East gathered to hold a meeting and discuss the current state of Arab cinema.

== See also ==
- Middle East and North Africa (MENA)
- List of Arab League countries by population
- Arabic language influence on the Spanish language
- Arab League
- International Association of Arabic Dialectology
- List of countries and territories where Arabic is an official language
- List of Muslim states and dynasties
- Islamic world

== Sources ==
- Baumann, Andrea (2006). Influences of culture on the styles of business behaviour between Western and Arab managers. Norderstedt, Germany: GRIN. ISBN 978-3-638-86642-2.
- Deng, Francis Mading (1995). War of visions: Conflict of identities in the Sudan. Washington, D.C.: The Brookings Institution. ISBN 0-8157-1794-6.
- Frishkopf, Michael (2010). "Introduction: Music and media in the Arab world and Music and media in the Arab world as music and media in the Arab world: A metadiscourse". In Frishkopf, Michael (ed.). Music and media in the Arab world. Cairo: The American University in Cairo Press. ISBN 978-977-416-293-0.
- Hourani, Albert Habib (1991). A History of the Arab Peoples. Cambridge, Mass.: Warner Books. ISBN 978-0-674-39565-7.
- Kronholm, Tryggve (1993). "Arab culture: Reality or fiction?". In Palva, Heikki; Vikør, Knut S. (eds.). The Middle East: Unity and diversity: Papers from the second Nordic conference on Middle Eastern studies. Nordic proceedings in Asian studies. Vol. 5. Copenhagen: Nordic Institute of Asian Studies. ISBN 87-87062-24-0.
- Reader, John (1997). Africa: A Biography of the Continent. New York: Vintage. ISBN 978-0-679-40979-3.
- Rejwan, Nissim (1974). Nasserist ideology: its exponents and critics. New York: Halsted Press. ISBN 0-470-71628-2.
- Rinnawi, Khalil (2006). Instant nationalism: McArabism, al-Jazeera and transnational media in the Arab world. Lanham, Maryland: University Press of America. ISBN 978-0-7618-3439-7.
- Sullivan, Earl L.; Ismael, Jacqueline S., eds. (1991). "Preface". The contemporary study of the Arab world. Edmonton, Alberta: The University of Alberta Press. ISBN 0-88864-211-3.
- Saint-Prot, Charles (2003). French Policy toward the Arab World. Abu Dhabi: Emirates Center for Strategic Studies and Research. ISBN 978-9948-00-336-6.
