= Charles Saint-Prot =

French geopolitician and writer

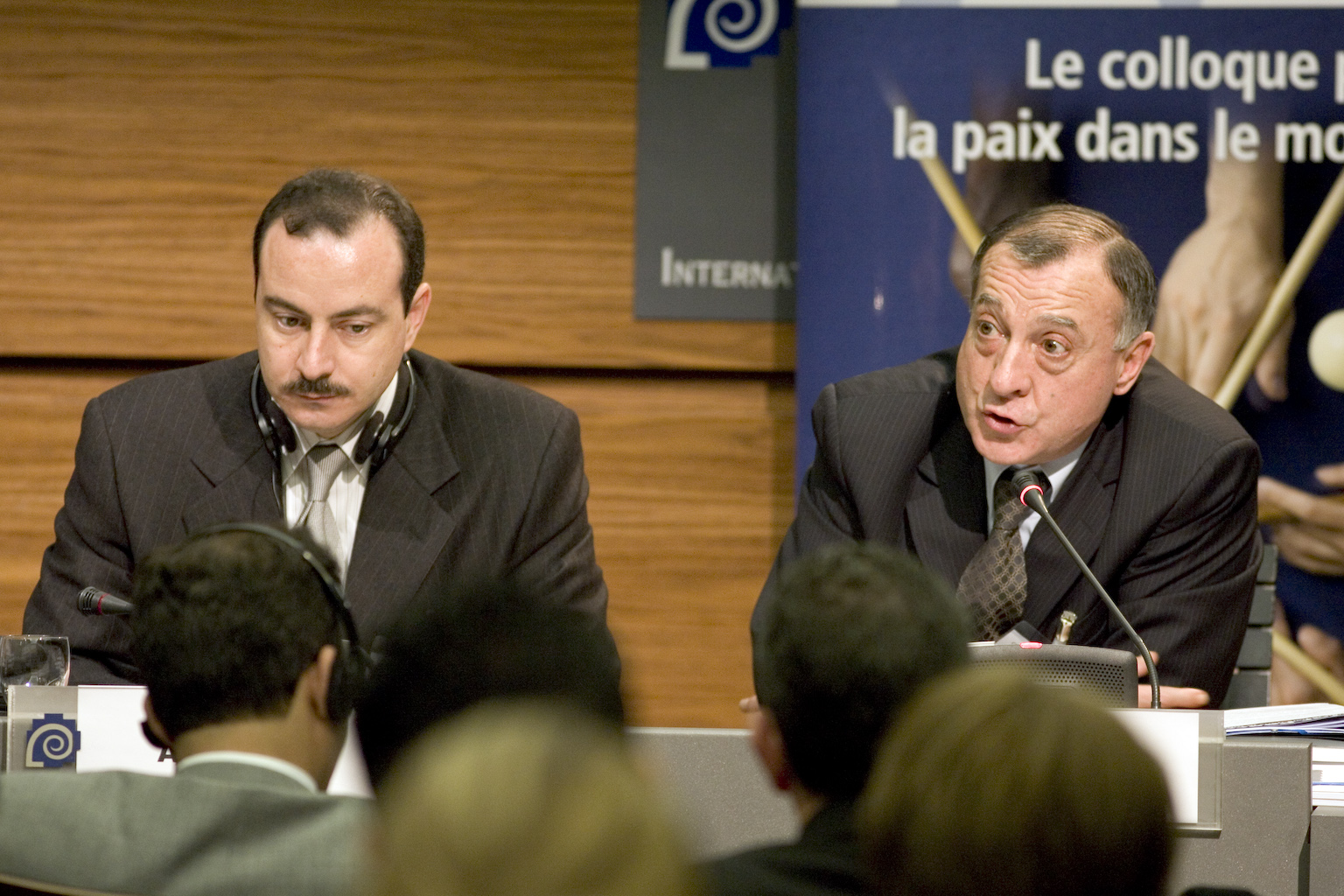
Charles Saint-Prot (on the right).

Charles Saint-Prot (born 26 January 1951) is a French geopolitician and writer. He is a historian specializing in international relations and geopolitics, in particular, questions of the Middle East and the Islamic world. Saint-Prot is the director of the Observatoire d'études géopolitiques (Observatory of geopolitical studies) in Paris, a research center on the international relations, and is the director, with Zeina el Tibi, of the publication Études géopolitiques

The Observatory of Geopolitical Studies (OEG) is a French institute, which has the aim of contributing to the promotion of scientific research in the various fields of geopolitics. A Council of orientation gathers a team of academics, researchers, specialists and diplomats. The Observatory of geopolitical studies has its seat in Paris, an office in Beirut and correspondents in many countries.

Saint-Prot is doctor in political science and searcher at the Institute of International, European and Comparative Law (Faculté de droit de Paris Descartes), specializing in Islamic law.

He has about 30 publications to his credit, some of which have been translated into English and Arabic.

== A specialist of Islam ==
Saint-Prot published Islam. L'avenir de la Tradition entre révolution et occidentalisation (Paris, ed. Le Rocher), Islam.The Future of Tradition between Revolution and Westernization ( Le Rocher publisher, Paris) in 2008.

The main subject of this book is Islam and the challenge of the future between revolutionary sectarianism and westernization. Nowadays Islam has become a main concern to the world. Words as "Islamism", "radical Islam", "salafism", "wahhabism", are often used without a clear meaning and content. Saint-Prot explains how orthodox Sunni Islam succeeds in bringing together the largest number of the Muslims with a creed, legal principles and rules which were defined by the traditionalist current. Tradition never rejected reformism and cannot be compared with rigid conservatism or with minority, but active, trends defined by their radical revolutionary sectarianism. Far from encouraging the radicalism whose most spectacular consequence is terrorism, the Tradition is the voice of Islam which tries to reconcile faith and respect of the immutable dogma and nowadays evolutions by the way of ijtihad (effort at reasoning to find a solution to a legal question)

Saint-Prot develops a new analysis of great traditionalists as Ahmed Ibn Hanbal or Ibn Taymiyyah, and having as a main reference the works of the pre-reformist Mohammed Abdul Wahhab. The thesis studies the developments and evolution of the traditionist doctrines, especially from a socio-political and legal point of view, since the first centuries of Islam up to now, taking into account the important reformist trend with thinkers as Al Afghani, Mohammed Abdu, Rashid Rida or Abdul Rahman Al Kawakibi.

This book demonstrates that the Islamic Tradition is a better answer to the sectarian extremists drifts than a westernization which would lead to the denial and loss of the Muslim identity, which is distinguished by a symbiosis between the temporal and the spiritual.

== Works ==
- La France et le renouveau arabe, Paris, Copernic, 1980.
- Présence de l'Islam (dir.), Paris, 1983.
- Les mystères syriens, Paris, Albin Michel, 1984 (Traduit en arabe, Le Caire)
- Saddam Hussein. Un gaullisme arabe Paris: Albin Michel, 1987 (Traduit en arabe, Bagdad). Prix Dupleix.
- Yasser Arafat, Paris: Jean Picollec, 1990 (traduit en arabe).
- L'Europe déraisonnable (collectif).Paris: F.X. de Guibert-Valmonde, 1992.
- Le nationalisme arabe, Paris: Ellipses, 1995 (traduit en arabe, Alger, 1996).
- L'Arabie heureuse, Paris; Ellipses, 1997 (traduit en anglais et en arabe).Prix de la Société de géographie de Paris.
- Histoire de l'Irak, Paris, Ellipses, 1999.
- La pensée française, Paris-Lausanne: L'Âge d'homme, 2002.
- French Policy toward the Arab World, Abou Dhabi, ECSSR, 2003 (traduit en arabe).
- Le Liban regard vers l'avenir (dir.), Paris: OEG-Études géopolitiques, 2004.
- L'Arabie saoudite à l'épreuve des temps modernes (dir. avec Zeina el Tibi), Paris: OEG-Études géopolitiques, 2004.
- L'eau, nouvel enjeu géopolitiques (dir. avec Zeina el Tibi), Paris: OEG-Études géopolitiques, 2005.
- Djibouti au cœur de la géopolitique de la Corne de l'Afrique (dir. avec Zeina el Tibi), Paris: OEG-Études géopolitiques, 2005 (traduit en anglais).
- Géopolitique du Soudan (dir. avec Zeina el Tibi), Paris: OEG-Études géopolitiques, 2006.
- Les églises évangéliques et le jeu des États-Unis dans le monde arabe. Bruxelles: Solidarité-Orient, 2006 (traduit en flamand)
- La politique arabe de la France, OEG Études géopolitiques 7, 2007.
- France and the Arabian Gulf (col.), Abou Dhabi: ECSSR, 2007.
- L'Arabie saoudite face au terrorisme, dir., Paris: OEG-Karthala, Études géopolitiques 8, 2008.
- Quelle union pour quelle Méditerranée ?, dir. avec Zeina el Tibi. Paris : Observatoire d'études géopolitiques, Études géopolitiques 9- Karthala, 2008.
- Islam: l'avenir de la Tradition entre révolution et occidentalisation. Paris, Le Rocher, 2008 (traduit en arabe et en anglais, 2010).
- Le Maroc en marche (dir.). Paris : CNRS éditions, 2009.
- Western Perception and Attitudes Towards Islam, Abu Dhabi, ECSSR, 2010, traduit en arabe.
- L'enjeu du dialogue des civilisations, dir. avec Jean-Pierre Machelon. Actes du colloque de Riyad (mars 2009) sous le haut patronage du roi Abdallah Ibn Abdelaziz al Saoud et du Président de la République française, M. Nicolas Sarkozy. Paris : Observatoire d'études géopolitiques, collection Études géopolitiques 10- Karthala, 2010.
- L'Occident et l'Islam. Abou Dhabi : ECSSR, 2010, en arabe.
- Vers un modèle marocain de régionalisation, dir. avec Ahmed Bouachik et Frédéric Rouvillois, Paris-Rabat, CNRS éditions et Remald, 2010.
- La tradition islamique de la réforme, Paris, CNRS éditions, 2010, traduction en arabe, Le Caire, Centre national de la traduction, 2013, trad. en espagnol, Barcelone, ed. Bellaterra, 2014..
- L'Islam et l'effort d'adaptation au monde contemporain. L'impératif de l'ijtihâd, dir., Paris, CNRS éditions, 2011.
- Mohammed V ou la monarchie populaire, Paris-Monaco, Le Rocher, 2011, trad. en arabe, Rabat, Marsam, 2015.
- La Constitution marocaine de 2011, lectures croisées, dir. avec Ahmed Bouachik et Michel Degoffe, Rabat, Remald, 2012.
- La finance islamique et la crise de l'économie contemporaine, dir. avec Thierry Rambaud, Paris, OEG-Karthala, col. « études géopolitiques 11 », 2012, 120 p. Prix TURGOT-FFA de la Francophonie, trad. en arabe.
- Le Mouvement national arabe. Emergence et maturation du nationalisme arabe de la Nahdaa au Baas, Paris, Ellipses, 2013, 176 p.
- L'exception marocaine, dir. avec Frédéric Rouvillois, Paris, Ellipses, 2013, 282 p.
- L'évolution constitutionnelle de l'Égypte, dir. avec Jean-Yves de Cara, Paris, OEG-Karthala, col. « études géopolitiques 12 », 2014, 184 p.
- Sahara marocain, Le dossier d'un conflit artificiel, sous la direction de Charles Saint-Prot, Jean-Yves de Cara et Christophe Boutin, Paris, éditions du Cerf, 2016, 320 pages [www.editionsducerf.fr/librairie/livre/17647/sahara-marocain], translated in English
- "Handbook on the Question of Moroccan Sahara", in 4 languages (French, English, Arabic and Spanish), avec JY de Cara et C. Boutin, Paris, éditions du Cerf, 2017
- "Géopolitique des Émirats arabes unis", Paris, éd. Karthala, collection « études géopolitiques », 2019.
- "Mohammed VI, ou la monarchie visionnaire", Paris, éd. du Cerf, 2019.
