= Music of the United Arab Emirates =

The music of the United Arab Emirates stems from the Eastern Arabia music traditions. Distinctive dance songs from the area's fishermen are also well-known. Liwa (or leiwah / leywah) is a type of music and dance performed mainly in communities which contain descendants of Bantu peoples from the African Great Lakes region, and hybrid Afro-Arab rhythms such as the Sha'abi al-Emirati and Bandari remain the standard in both traditional and popular music in this historically cosmopolitan country.

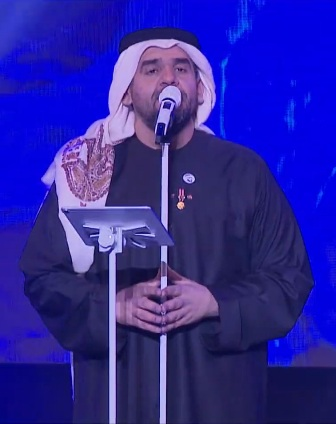
Hussain al-Jassmi, Emirati singer - 2020

Performers in the country include Mohammed Al Muhairi (better known as Mehad Hamad), Ahlam Ali Al Shamsi, and Hussain Al Jasmi.

The Emirati-American composer Mohammed Fairouz has been commissioned to premiere his fifth symphony at the Abu Dhabi Festival in 2020

In 2020 Emirati Composer Ihab Darwish was commissioned by The Palm Fountain (Dubai, UAE) - world’s largest fountain by the Guinness Book of World Record, to compose an official musical theme “Aim For The Sky” as a sonic brand and its signature music. The composition pays homage to the UAE's culture as well as capture Dubai's cosmopolitanism and is performed regularly at The Palm Fountain at The Pointe, Dubai, from December 1, 2020.

In 2021 Abu Dhabi Festival commissioned Emirati composer Ihab Darwish, in collaboration with Emmy-winning composer John Debney and Academy Award-winning composer David Shire, to celebrate the historic opening of the Abrahamic Family House in Abu Dhabi. Bringing together top international composers, musicians and vocal ensembles from Christian, Jewish and Muslim backgrounds, the Symphony of Three. Peace, love, tolerance celebrates unity and peace. The premiere took place on December 30, 2022, and is available online on YouTube.

In June 2022, Ihab Darwish became the first Emirati invited to be a voting member of the Grammy Recording Academy. Darwish is one of 2,000 newly invited voting members to join the Recording Academy.

== Original music in the UAE ==
The UAE houses a lively underground music scene consisting mostly of expatriates. Concentrated in Dubai, the majority of local artists play rock and metal music. Some musicians also play alternative styles of music such as ska, punk, house and experimental music.

Yassin Alsalman, better known by his stage name Narcy, was born in Dubai in 1982.

Canadian singer Karl Wolf lived in Dubai between the ages of three and seventeen, and has since returned to perform in the UAE.

Wissam Khodur, better known as the Syrian/Lebanese MC Eslam Jawaad, has been living in the UAE since 2011. In 2017 he appeared onstage with Gorillaz, having previously worked with bandleader Damon Albarn on The Good, the Bad & the Queen.

Members of the psychedelic indie band Flamingods lived for a time in the UAE, and founder Kamal Rasool credits Dubai as a pivotal incubator and inspiration behind 2016's third album Majesty.

In 2012 the UAE's only chain music retailer, Virgin Megastores, revealed a chart of the best-selling local acts to entertainment magazine Time Out Dubai. Based on total sales of all combined releases, the list was nominally topped by Karl Wolf, with second and third places going to soul-pop quartet Abri and rock group Juliana Down - two of the first homegrown acts to achieve widespread recognition in the Emirates.

In 2015 this concept was repeated in The National, which compiled a list of Virgin's 20 best-selling local releases of the past five years, as well as breaking the chart down by genre. With Wolf this time deemed exempt, the list was topped by Juliana Down's 2011 album Empires (Abri's two albums were released earlier in 2008 and 2009), followed by house-pop duo SickAsSwans' debut These Words and Nigerian-born urban act Ash Hamman's self-titled debut.

A year later The National updated the chart looking specifically at the best-selling releases of the past 12 months, revealing metal act Svengali to be the best-seller with debut Theory of Mind.

Among the best-known UAE acts internationally are metal band Nervecell. Other hard rock and metal acts from the UAE to tour internationally include Anuryzm, E.Y.E., Point of View and Jay Wud, who launched a fundraising campaign to finance sessions in Los Angeles for third album Transitions.

In 2012 hard rock quintet Point of View launched their debut album Revolutionize the Revolutionary with a concert alongside Ron 'Bumblefoot' Thal, then a member of Guns N' Roses, who appeared onstage performing songs by both bands. Thal later joined the band on a tour of India and appeared onstage in Abu Dhabi wearing a "PoV" t-shirt. Point of View's lead singer Nikhil Uzgare later branched out into Bollywood, recording a rock song as the theme to movie Iraada.

Following the breakup of Abri, eponymous lead singer Hamdan Al-Abri released a self-titled EP before joining funk-rock band Bull Funk Zoo in 2012, alongside guitarist Assaad Lakkis. He later formed the popular cover band Abri & Funk Radius alongside jazz musicians Rony and Elie Afif, which released its first original music in 2017, debuting the single Sunny Daze, and was the only UAE act invited to perform at the alternative music festival Wasla. Lakkis went on to lead Bull Funk Zoo solo. In 2017 Al-Abri also unveiled new music as a member of trio Abri & the Dream Fleet, collaborating alongside producers Megadon Betamax and Adriano K on the album We Fly. The latter had earlier produced a collection of South American folk songs and curated an accompanying remix disc featuring contributions from international producers, released in 2012 as A L.A.S..

After a period of inactivity, in 2015 Juliana Down frontman Dia Hassan released a debut solo single What is Love?. Juliana Down's former main songwriter and keyboardist Saleh Hamed began releasing music under the stage name "Dozenz" including the album "After The Storm/Chasing The Muse" (originally titled "The Album") in 2021. Following the split of SickAwSwans, in the same year Clarita de Quiroz released her debut album Speak. Delete. Repeat.

Formed in 2013, house-pop duo Hollaphonic have received international attention in the press, recording fourth single Dangerous with guest vocals from British reality TV star Vince Kidd.

Teenage pop singer Esther Eden enjoyed significant local exposure after being handpicked by British star Jessie J to guest onstage at 2014's Redfest DXB festival. Eden was later signed by Universal Music MENA and performed as a solo artist at the same festival a year later.

In 2015 hip-hop trio The Recipe launched a well-received comeback with the single Death to Get Here.

Behold The Locus released their second album 'Nations' in an online format during the summer of 2020.

== Jazz and improvised music in the UAE ==
The UAE is also home to a small but productive collective of jazz musicians. Among the most celebrated is Lebanese pianist Tarek Yamani (whose third album Peninsular was premiered at the 2017 Abu Dhabi Festival) and compatriots, drummer Rony Afif and his brother Elie Afif.

Jordanian oud player and guitarist Kamal Musallam has released eight albums to date, fusing jazz and Arabic influences, and is consistently ranked among the UAE's bestselling acts. Musallam has performed with notable international musicians including Hans Zimmer, Sting, Bobby McFerrin, Yo-Yo Ma, George Benson and Stanley Jordan and has recorded a full album with Billy Cobham under his project EastMania. For 2009 album Lulu (a tribute to UAE heritage) he collaborated with Emirati folk group Sokoor Al Magabeel, as well as with Hamdan Al Abri and Rasha Rizk.

== Music Schools in the UAE ==
Music education in the UAE has seen remarkable growth in recent years, driven by the expansion of educational programs and institutions dedicated to fostering musical talent. As a result, the country has become a prominent Middle East hub for music education, offering diverse opportunities for both local and international students. Several institutions are now offering comprehensive programs across a wide range of musical disciplines, from classical to contemporary genres, and catering to students of all skill levels.

Among the most prestigious music schools in the UAE are:

1. Melodica Music Academy
2. The Piano Academy
3. Music at Home Academy
4. Dubai Music School
5. Berklee Abu Dhabi

Berklee Abu Dhabi is particularly noteworthy success case. In 2020, Berklee, one of the world's foremost institutions for contemporary music, dance, and theater, opened an education program in UAE in collaboration with the Department of Culture and Tourism.

== Notable releases ==
Below is an alphabetical list of UAE-based artists who have released original material commercially in the English language:

- Abri - Albums: Sunchild (2008), Blank Notes (2009)
- Abri & the Dream Fleet - Album: We Fly (2017)
- Absolace - Albums: Resolve(d) (2010), Fractals (2012)
- Adriano K - Album: A L.A.S. (2012)
- ARS Trio - Album: Time (2015)
- Beat Antenna - EP: Half Now, Half Later (2009)
- Bee - Album: The Singles Era (2020)
- Behold the Locus – Albums: Behold the Locus (2010), Nations (2020)
- Benevolent – Album: The Covenant (2014)
- Bull Funk Zoo - Albums: Bull Funk Zoo (2013), Dangerous Radio (2016)
- Clarita de Quiroz - Album: Speak.Delete.Repeat (2015)
- Craig Perry - Album: Jigsaw Repeat (2016)
- DaVinci Park - Album: Overlooking Florence (2016)
- DD Foxx – Album: Had to Be Me (2012)
- Desert Heat - Album: When the Desert Speaks (2008)
- Dwight Dickerson – Album: Glimpses (2011)
- Elie Afif - Album: Giant Steps to Heaven (2011)
- Esther Eden - Album: Solitaire (2014)
- E.Y.E. - Albums: Empty Yard Experiment (2011), Kallisti (2014)
- Fat Randall - EP: Keep it Down (2016)
- Hollaphonic - Album: Personal Space (2015), EP: Stand Up (2020)
- Ihab Darwish - Albums: Waves Of My Life (2018), Hekayat: Symphonic Tales (2021), Symphony of Three: Peace, Love, Tolerance (2022)
- Jay Wud - Albums: New Blood (2010), False Utopia (2012), Transitions (2017)
- Juliana Down - Albums: Cause and Affect (2006), Empires (2011)
- Kamal Musallam - Albums: On a Jordan River's Side (2003), Out of my City (2008), Lulu (2009), Songs for Seung-eun (2011), The Best of Kamal Musallam 1999-2011 (2012), Homemade in Rome (2014), World Peace Trio (2017), Handmade in Hummus Land (2020)
- Kicksound - EP: Kicksound (2015)
- Moh Flow - EP: Inspired (2014), Album: This is Yo(u) (2017)
- Moonshine - EP: Moonshine (2010)
- Muhaisnah Four - Album: A Memoir (2017)
- Naser Mestarihi - EP: Naser Mestarihi (2010), Albums: 1987 (2013), Praed Street (2016)
- Nervecell - EP: Human Chaos (2004), Albums: Preaching Venom (2008), Psychogenocide (2011), Past, Present... Torture (2017)
- Nikotin - Album: Panodrama (2014)
- Palayan - Album: Metanoia (2017)
- Point of View - Album: Revolutionize the Revolutionary (2012)
- Rouba – Album: Mama’s Back (2013)
- Sandwash - Album: Master Blaster Hole (2010)
- Sho? - EP: I Don't Wanna Go (2010)
- SickAsSwans - Album: These Words (2012)
- Sun King - Album: Lotus (2008)
- Svengali – EP: Unscathed (2014), Albums: Theory of Mind (2015), Sayonara (2020)
- The Boxtones - Albums: In the Pockets of Clowns (2014), Home (2016)
- The Gypsy Swing Project - Album: Paris-Dubai (2014)
- Tim Hassall - Albums: Oh Restless Heart (2010), Gallatin (2014)
- Universal Rogue - EP: Theory for all Seasons (2008)
- Vandalye - EP: From the Beginning (2016)
- Vin Sinners - Albums: An Element of Surprise (2011), A Mighty Black Box (2014)

== Compilation albums ==
A number of compilation albums have been released independently, highlighting different genres of music from the UAE:

- Ampulance Vol. 1 (2006), Vol. 2 (2007) and Vol. 3 (2009) - Punk and alternative music
- Desert Lounge Vol. 1 (2005), Vol. 2 (2007), Vol. 3 (2009) and Vol. 4 (2011) - Ambient and chill-out music
- Ma'ana Vol. 1 (2015) and Vol. 2 (2016) - Dance music and electronica
- Metal Asylum Vol. 1 (2010) and Vol. 2 (2011) - Hard rock and heavy metal
- United Assault (2015) - Hardcore punk and extreme metal

== See also ==
- Dubai Desert Rock Festival
- Dubai International Jazz Festival
