= List of people from Dubai =

This is a list of notable people from Dubai, United Arab Emirates.

== A ==
- Abdelmonem Bin Eisa Alserkal
- Mohammed bin Ali Al Abbar
- Dr. Ali Al Numairy
- Ahlam
- Juma al Majid
- Adnan Khan
- Ahmad Mohammad Hasher Al Maktoum
- Maitha bint Mohammed bin Rashid Al Maktoum
- Ahmed bin Saeed Al Maktoum
- Mohammad Al Murr
- Nasser Hassan Al-Shaikh
- Nujoom AlGhanem
- Ali Rashid Lootah
- Suhail Galadari
- Alia bint Khalifa bin Saeed al Maktoum
- Hamdan bin Rashid Al Maktoum

== B ==
- Kehkashan Basu
- Fāṭimah al-Baqqālī, calligrapher
- Adi Bitar
- Brigita Brezovac
- Ahmad Bin Byat

== C ==
- Carl and the Reda Mafia, musical group

== E ==
- Esther Eden

== F ==
- Fahad Alhashmi
- Adham Faramawy

== G ==
- Saeed Mohammad Al Gandi
- Mohammad Al Gaz
- Mohammed Al Gergawi
- Hayla Ghazal
- Wael Ghonim
- Abdul Aziz Al Ghurair
- Abdulla Al Ghurair
- Saif Ahmad Al Ghurair

== H ==
- Diana Haddad
- Hamdan bin Mohammed Al Maktoum
- Mohammed Saeed Harib
- Princess Haya bint Al Hussein

== J ==
- Ed Jones

== K ==
- Abdulla Al Kamali
- Mohammed Khalfan Bin Kharbash

== L ==
- Wedad Lootah

== M ==
- Al Maktoum family
- Ahmed bin Rashid Al Maktoum
- Maktoum bin Mohammed bin Rashid Al Maktoum
- Maktoum Hasher Maktoum Al Maktoum
- Rashid bin Mohammed Al Maktoum
- Manal bint Mohammed bin Rashid Al Maktoum
- Mohammed bin Khalifa Al Maktoum
- Mohi-Din Binhendi
- Jessy Mendiola

== N ==
- Ghanem Nuseibeh

== O ==
- Mohammad Omar (footballer)
- Ousha the Poet

== Q ==
- Elham Al Qasim

== R ==
- Rashid Ahmad Muhammad Bin Fahad

== S ==
- Saeed bin Maktoum bin Rashid Al Maktoum
- Saeed-Al-Saffar
- Hussain Sajwani
- Talal Al-Nuaimi
- Mohamed Salim
- Mai Selim
- Mohammed bin Sulayem
- Sultan Ahmed bin Sulayem
- Sultan Zarawani
- Mohamed Yehia Zakaria
