= 翔 =

翔, meaning "fly", is an Asian given name.

It may refer to:

- Shō, Sho or Show, Japanese masculine given name
- Xiang, Chinese masculine given name
  - Ching Cheong (程翔; born 1949), Chinese senior journalist
  - Fei Xiang (費翔; born 1960), Taiwanese-American singer
  - Liu Xiang (刘翔; born 1982), Chinese footballer

== See also ==
- Sho (disambiguation)
- Show (disambiguation)
- Xiang (disambiguation)
