= Shigeki =

- Gender: Male

Origin
- Origin: Japanese
- Meaning: Different meanings depending on the kanji used

Shigeki (written: 茂樹, 茂喜, 茂輝, 繁樹, 重喜 or 成樹) is a masculine Japanese given name. Notable people with the name include:

- Shigeki Abe (阿部 茂樹; born 1972), Japanese baseball player
- Shigeki Hosokawa (細川 茂樹; born 1971), Japanese model and actor
- Shigeki Kurata (藏田 茂樹; born 1972), Japanese footballer
- Shigeki Maruyama (丸山 茂樹; born 1969), Japanese golfer
- Shigeki Mino (三野 茂樹; born 1932), Japanese modern pentathlete
- Shigeki Mori (森 茂喜), Japanese businessman and politician
- Shigeki Morimoto (森本 茂樹), Japanese video game designer
- Nishimura Shigeki (西村 茂樹; 1828–1902), Japanese educator and writer
- Shigeki Osawa (大澤 茂樹; born 1986), Japanese mixed martial artist
- Shigeki Sato (politician) (佐藤 茂樹; born 1959), Japanese politician
- Shigeki Sato (wrestler) (佐藤 茂樹; born 1969), better known as Dick Togo, Japanese professional wrestler
- Shigeki Toyoshima (born 1971), Japanese high jumper
- Shigeki Tsujimoto (辻本 茂輝; born 1979), Japanese footballer
- Shigeki Wakabayashi (若林 重喜; born 1966), Japanese baseball player
- Shigeki Yano (矢野 繁樹), Japanese Paralympic athlete

== Fictional characters ==
- Shigeki Amano (天野 茂樹), character in the manga series Magical Girl Pretty Sammy
- Shigeki Satō (佐藤 成樹), character in the anime series Whistle!
