= Sho =

Sho, Shō or SHO may refer to:

== Music ==
- Shō (instrument) (笙), a Japanese wind instrument
- Kane (instrument) (鉦), a Japanese percussion instrument
- Sho?, a Dubai rock band

== People ==
- Shō (given name), including Sho
- Shō (surname)
- Sho (singer) (born 1967), stage name for Masatoshi Ono, Japanese heavy metal singer
- Sho (wrestler) (born 1989), Japanese wrestler

== Transportation ==
- Ford Taurus SHO (Super High Output) car
  - Ford SHO V6 engine
  - Ford SHO V8 engine
- King Mswati III International Airport (IATA code), Eswatini
- Sokcho Airport (former IATA code), South Korea
- Finland Steamship Company (Finnish: Suomen Höyrylaiva Osakeyhtiö)

== Other uses ==
- Sho (board game), Tibet
- Sho (letter), for the Bactrian language
- Shō (unit) (升), a Japanese unit of volume
- Shō River, Japan
- Regulation SHO
- Senior house officer, in hospitals in Ireland
- Showtime (TV network)
- Shutout, in team games
- Station house officer, of a police station in India and Pakistan
- VV SHO, a Dutch soccer club
- An historical currency of Tibet
- Simple Harmonic Oscillator (Physics)

== See also ==
- Shodō, Japanese calligraphy
