= List of mainstream rock performers =

This is an alphabetical list of mainstream rock performers spanning all subgenres and fusions within the genre of rock music. Artists included are known for creating material predominantly within a style of rock music have enjoyed considerable success on singles or album charts; recorded multiple songs that have endured or increased in popularity over time and continue to receive heavy airplay, streaming or downloads; and garnered a significant following. Solo artists are sorted by surname.

== 0-9 ==
- 10cc
- 10 Years
- 3 Doors Down
- 311
- .38 Special

== A ==
- ABBA
- AC/DC
- Accept
- Bryan Adams
- Aerosmith
- AFI
- Air Supply
- The Alan Parsons Project
- Alice in Chains
- The All-American Rejects
- The Allman Brothers Band
- Alter Bridge
- Ambrosia
- America
- The Animals
- Adam Ant
- Anthrax
- April Wine
- Arcade Fire
- Arctic Monkeys
- Asia
- Audioslave
- Avenged Sevenfold
- Awolnation

== B ==
- The B-52s
- Bachman–Turner Overdrive
- Bad Company
- Badfinger
- The Band
- The Bangles
- Barenaked Ladies
- Bay City Rollers
- The Beach Boys
- Beastie Boys
- The Beatles
- Bee Gees
- Beck
- Ben Folds Five
- Pat Benatar
- Chuck Berry
- The Big Bopper
- Billy Talent
- The Black Crowes
- The Black Keys
- Black Sabbath
- Black Stone Cherry
- Black Veil Brides
- Blink-182
- Blondie (band)
- Bloodhound Gang
- Blue October
- Blue Öyster Cult
- Blues Traveler
- James Blunt
- Blur
- Bon Jovi
- Boston
- David Bowie
- Bowling for Soup
- The Boxtones
- Boys Like Girls
- Bread
- Breaking Benjamin
- Bring Me the Horizon
- Jackson Browne
- Buckcherry
- Jeff Buckley
- Bullet for My Valentine
- Chris de Burgh
- Bush
- The Byrds

== C ==
- The Cab
- Cage the Elephant
- Cake
- Canned Heat
- Captain Beefheart and The Magic Band
- The Cardigans
- The Cars
- Catfish and the Bottlemen
- Harry Chapin
- Tracy Chapman
- Cheap Trick
- Chevelle
- Chicago
- Chubby Checker
- Cinderella
- City and Colour
- Eric Clapton
- The Clash
- Eddie Cochran
- Joe Cocker
- Coheed and Cambria
- Cold Chisel
- Coldplay
- Collective Soul
- Phil Collins
- Alice Cooper
- Alice Cooper (band)
- Chris Cornell
- Elvis Costello
- Counting Crows
- The Cranberries
- Crash Test Dummies
- Cream
- Creed
- Creedence Clearwater Revival
- Jim Croce
- Crosby, Stills, Nash & Young
- Christopher Cross
- Sheryl Crow
- Crowded House
- The Cult
- The Cure

== D ==
- Damn Yankees
- Charlie Daniels
- Dashboard Confessional
- Daughtry
- The Dave Clark Five
- Dave Matthews Band
- Days of the New
- Death Cab for Cutie
- Deep Purple
- Def Leppard
- Deftones
- Depeche Mode
- Bo Diddley
- Dio
- Dire Straits
- Disturbed
- Fats Domino
- Donovan
- The Doobie Brothers
- The Doors
- Dr. Hook & the Medicine Show
- Dropkick Murphys
- Drowning Pool
- Duran Duran
- Ian Dury & the Blockheads
- Bob Dylan

== E ==
- Eagles
- Echo & the Bunnymen
- Duane Eddy
- The Edgar Winter Group
- Electric Light Orchestra
- Emerson, Lake & Palmer
- England Dan & John Ford Coley
- Melissa Etheridge
- Europe
- Eurythmics (band)
- Evanescence
- Everclear
- Everlast
- The Everly Brothers
- Extreme

== F ==
- Faces
- Faith No More
- Fall Out Boy
- Bryan Ferry
- Filter
- Finger Eleven
- FireHouse
- Five Finger Death Punch
- Five for Fighting
- The Fixx
- The Flaming Lips
- Fleetwood Mac
- Flogging Molly
- Florence + the Machine
- Flyleaf
- Foals
- Dan Fogelberg
- John Fogerty
- Foo Fighters
- Foreigner
- Foster the People
- The Four Seasons
- Peter Frampton
- Franz Ferdinand
- The Fray
- Glenn Frey
- Fuel
- The Fugs
- Fun.
- Funkadelic

== G ==
- Peter Gabriel
- Garbage
- Genesis
- Ghost
- Gin Blossoms
- Gary Glitter
- The Go-Go's
- Godsmack
- Golden Earring
- Goo Goo Dolls
- Good Charlotte
- Grand Funk Railroad
- Grateful Dead
- Great White
- Green Day
- Greta Van Fleet
- The Guess Who
- Guns N' Roses

== H ==
- Halestorm
- Bill Haley & His Comets
- Hall & Oates
- George Harrison
- Heart
- Jimi Hendrix
- Don Henley
- Herman's Hermits
- Highly Suspect
- Hinder
- The Hives
- Hole
- The Hollies
- Buddy Holly
- Hoobastank
- Hootie & the Blowfish

== I ==
- Icehouse
- Billy Idol
- Imagine Dragons
- Incubus
- Interpol
- INXS
- Iron Maiden

== J ==
- The J. Geils Band
- The Jam
- Tommy James and the Shondells
- Jane's Addiction
- Jefferson Airplane
- Jefferson Starship
- The Jesus and Mary Chain
- Jet
- Jethro Tull
- Joan Jett & the Blackhearts
- Jimmy Eat World
- Billy Joel
- Elton John
- Janis Joplin
- Journey
- Joy Division
- Judas Priest

== K ==
- Kaiser Chiefs
- Kaleo
- Kansas
- Keane
- Kid Rock
- The Killers
- Killswitch Engage
- Kings of Leon
- The Kinks
- Kiss
- Korn
- Lenny Kravitz

== L ==
- Lacuna Coil
- Lamb of God
- Avril Lavigne
- Led Zeppelin
- John Lennon
- Huey Lewis and the News
- Jerry Lee Lewis
- Lifehouse
- Limp Bizkit
- Linkin Park
- Little Richard
- Little River Band
- Live
- Living Colour
- Kenny Loggins
- Loverboy
- The Lovin' Spoonful
- The Lumineers
- Lynyrd Skynyrd

== M ==
- The Mamas & the Papas
- Manfred Mann
- Manfred Mann (musician)
- Manfred Mann's Earth Band
- Manfred Mann Chapter Three
- Marilyn Manson
- Marilyn Manson (band)
- The Marshall Tucker Band
- Matchbox Twenty
- John Mayer
- John Mayall
- John Mayall & the Bluesbreakers
- Paul McCartney
- Meat Loaf
- Megadeth
- John Mellencamp
- Men at Work
- Metallica
- Midnight Oil
- Mike + the Mechanics
- Modest Mouse
- Eddie Money
- The Monkees
- Montgomery Gentry
- The Moody Blues
- Alanis Morissette
- Van Morrison
- Morrissey
- The Mothers of Invention
- Mötley Crüe
- Motörhead
- Mudvayne
- Mumford & Sons
- Michael Martin Murphey
- Muse
- My Chemical Romance

== N ==
- New York Dolls
- Nickelback
- Stevie Nicks
- Harry Nilsson
- Nine Inch Nails
- Nirvana
- No Doubt
- Ted Nugent

== O ==
- Oasis
- The Offspring
- OneRepublic
- Roy Orbison
- Ozzy Osbourne
- Our Lady Peace
- The Outfield

== P ==
- P.O.D.
- Panic! at the Disco
- Pantera
- Papa Roach
- Paramore
- Parliament (band)
- Parliament-Funkadelic
- Pearl Jam
- A Perfect Circle
- Tom Petty
- Tom Petty and the Heartbreakers
- Pink Floyd
- Pixies
- Robert Plant
- Poison
- The Police
- Iggy Pop
- Pop Evil
- The Presidents of the United States of America
- The Pretenders
- Elvis Presley
- The Pretty Reckless
- Primus
- Puddle of Mudd

== Q ==
- Queen
- Queens of the Stone Age
- Queensrÿche
- Quiet Riot

== R ==
- R.E.M.
- Radiohead
- Rage Against the Machine
- Rainbow
- Rammstein
- Ramones
- Ratt
- Red Hot Chili Peppers
- Lou Reed
- REO Speedwagon
- Chris Rea
- Rise Against
- Sixto Rodriguez
- The Rolling Stones
- Linda Ronstadt
- Roxy Music
- Royal Blood
- Run-DMC
- Rush
- Mitch Ryder

== S ==
- Saliva
- Sam Fender
- Santana
- Joe Satriani
- Saving Abel
- Scorpions
- The Script
- Seether
- Bob Seger & the Silver Bullet Band
- Sepultura
- Sex Pistols
- Shakin' Stevens
- Shinedown
- Silverchair
- Simon & Garfunkel
- Simple Minds
- Simple Plan
- Skid Row
- Skillet
- Slade
- Slayer
- Slipknot
- Sly and the Family Stone
- Small Faces
- Smash Mouth
- The Smashing Pumpkins
- The Smiths
- Smokie
- Snow Patrol
- Social Distortion
- Sonic Youth
- Soundgarden
- Bruce Springsteen
- Billy Squier
- Staind
- Ringo Starr
- Starset
- Starship
- Status Quo
- Steely Dan
- Steppenwolf
- Steve Miller Band
- Rod Stewart
- Sting
- The Stone Roses
- Stone Sour
- Stone Temple Pilots
- The Strokes
- Styx
- Sublime
- Sublime with Rome
- Sum 41
- Supertramp
- Survivor
- Sweet
- System of a Down

== T ==
- T. Rex
- Talking Heads
- James Taylor
- Ten Years After
- Tenacious D
- Tesla
- Theory of a Deadman
- Thin Lizzy
- Third Eye Blind
- Thirty Seconds to Mars
- George Thorogood and the Destroyers
- Thousand Foot Krutch
- Three Days Grace
- Three Dog Night
- Tool
- Toto
- Traffic
- The Tragically Hip
- Train
- The Traveling Wilburys
- Travis
- Trivium
- Twenty One Pilots
- Twisted Sister

== U ==
- U2
- UB40
- Ugly Kid Joe
- Uriah Heep
- The Used

== V ==
- Steve Vai
- Ritchie Valens
- Vampire Weekend
- Van Halen
- Van Zant (band)
- Stevie Ray Vaughan and Double Trouble
- Velvet Revolver
- The Velvet Underground
- The Verve
- Gene Vincent
- Volbeat

== W ==
- Joe Walsh
- Warrant
- W.A.S.P. (band)
- Weezer
- Jack White
- The White Stripes
- White Zombie
- Whitesnake
- The Who
- Wings
- Steve Winwood

== X ==
- X (American band)
- X Ambassadors

== Y ==
- The Yardbirds
- Yes
- Neil Young

== Z ==
- Frank Zappa
- Rob Zombie
- The Zombies
- ZZ Top
