= Carl and the Reda Mafia =

United Arab Emirates band

Carl & The Reda Mafia is a Dubai-based band formed in October 2014. The group consists of Carl Frenais from India (singer & songwriter), Tarek Reda from Egypt (guitarist and composer), Christos Asimakopoulos from Greece (bassist) and Abimbola Durojaye "Bims" from Nigeria (drummer). The band comprises a mixture of backgrounds that resulted in a hybrid sound known as "Funk Jam" combining elements of funk, rock and roll and blues with a pop music twist.

A few weeks after forming the band, Carl & The Reda Mafia were crowned winners of the prestigious BandJam battle of the bands organized by Al Ghurair Group. The band took home the first place after joining 60 other bands playing for a crowd of over 5,000 music lovers. Carl & The Reda Mafia got the chance to meet with one of the biggest selling bands in the Philippines, Rivermaya, in a mentorship session as part of their prize.

Building on their success at BandJam, the band then went on to perform at various gigs around the UAE including Dubai International Jazz Festival and Abu Dhabi Festival. Around May 2015, Carl & The Reda Mafia signed a record label and management deal with Abu Dhabi's local production studio White Cube Studios. Soon after they started recording their debut album What The?!.

In September 2015, the band was selected to open for the legendary rock band Bon Jovi at one of the biggest music venues in the Middle East, the Du Arena in Abu Dhabi on October 1, 2015. This marked their first appearance opening for a major world-renowned act.

Following their Bon Jovi gig they had the opportunity to open for world renowned hip hop artist J. Cole for an even bigger crowd at the Beats on The Beach concert in Abu Dhabi on November 27, 2015.

In January 2016 Carl Frenais (the frontman of the band) went viral on the internet after making a video mixing Indian harmonies and human beatboxing to the iPhone app Siri. The video was supposedly intended to be private and only shared amongst friends, but it was leaked and had more than 15 million views.

On February 19, 2016, Carl & The Reda Mafia released their debut album What The?! on the iTunes Store and all other major music streaming platforms including Apple Music, Spotify and SoundCloud. When asked what the band writes about, Carl Frenais said "I don’t write about love. At all. I think that’s an emotion that’s been used too much". The album What The?! specifically asks questions about what's happening around the world, and questions about why people think the way they think.

In April 2016, the band was awarded "Best Local Band" at the biggest nightlife and entertainment awards ceremony in UAE, HYPE Awards.

== Awards ==
Winner of BandJam Battle of The Bands (2014) - Al Ghureir Group.

Band Of The Year (2016) - Infusion Magazine.

Best Local Band (2016) - HYPE Awards.

"Funk-fried rock and roll from Carl & The Reda Mafia who took to their Bon Jovi warm up like true rock stars" - Infusion Magazine.

== Discography ==
=== Albums ===
What The?! (2016)

1. "Drown with Me"
2. "A Better Place"
3. "Moo Point of View" (Ft. Inphinix)
4. "Live Today"
5. "Crazy Town"
6. "Let the Music Take Control"
7. "Don't Freakin Waste My Time"
8. "My World"
9. "Starting New"
10. "We'll Go in Peace"

=== Singles ===
- "Fight for your queen" (2015)
