= Ihab Darwish =

Emirati composer

Ihab Darwish إيهاب درويش
- Born: United Arab Emirates
- Origin: United Arab Emirates
- Genres: Classical music, symphonic music, orchestral music, cinematic music, Emirati folk music, world music
- Occupation: Composer
- Label: Universal Music
- Website: https://www.ihabdarwish.com

Ihab Darwish is an Emirati composer, Universal Music Artist, and Recording Academy voting member. Darwish has been playing music since the age of ten and grew up in a family that supported his passion for music and composing. He received his Bachelors in Advertising and Art Design from the Lebanese American University in Beirut. Years after graduation, Darwish designed and created his own home recording studio equipped with state of the art instruments and technology. He has experimented with music for years, working mainly in the genre of classical music.

== Career ==
In 2017 Darwish's music was performed by the Beethoven Academy Orchestra in Poland, recorded in the Alvernia Studios. For the first time, his music was played by a sizeable orchestra. His first album "Waves of My Life" was launched in early 2018 and distributed across international digital music platforms by Universal Music MENA. In March 2018, Ihab Darwish received the title of “First Guest Composer” of the Beethoven Academy Orchestra.

After years of preparation, Ihab Darwish debuted his first complete orchestral work, Waves of my Life: Every Real Story Begins with a Note, with a world premiere performance at Abu Dhabi Festival on March 14, 2018 at Emirates Palace.

In 2020 Darwish was commissioned by The Palm Fountain (Dubai, UAE) - world’s largest fountain by the Guinness Book of World Record, to compose an official musical theme “Aim For The Sky” as a sonic brand and its signature music. The composition pays homage to the UAE's culture as well as is supposed to capture Dubai's cosmopolitanism and is performed regularly at The Palm Fountain at The Pointe, Dubai, from December 1, 2020.

In 2021 Darwish performed at Abu Dhabi Festival with his symphonic work Hekayat: Symphonic Tales. Hekayat, which means tales in English, is the first performance of its kind by an Emirati artist. The performers, recorded separately in their countries, will appear together as one orchestra on the stage of Abu Dhabi’s Emirates Palace Auditorium. Ihab Darwish brings together a group of international musicians, including Poland’s acclaimed Beethoven Academy Orchestra, conducted by maestro Tomasz Tokarczyk, VOX Chamber Choir, tenor José Cura, virtuoso musicians Sara Andon, Kodō, Carlos Piñana, Dharni, John Beasley and Kinan Azmeh as part of Abu Dhabi Festival’s commitment to cultural diplomacy and mission to supporting the growth of the performing arts in the United Arab Emirates and at a global level. With musicians, performers and the orchestra filmed individually in 21 cities around the world, the symphony required 675 zoom sessions and 86,600 man-hours of planning and production. The individual performances were synchronized digitally, and post-production technology placed all 128 artists on a virtual 3D model of the stage.

In 2021, inspired by The Abrahamic Family House, Ihab Darwish along with John Debney and David Shire has been commission to compose "Symphony of Three. Peace. Love. Tolerance". The symphonic performance commissioned and produced by Abu Dhabi Festival, and co-produced by Zofia Jeziorna, Ihab Darwish and Robert Townson, brought together vocal ensembles, composers and musicians from Christian, Jewish and Muslim backgrounds to celebrate dialogue among different faiths. The album was won Musivv Award in "collaboration of the year" category (2023).

In June 2022 Ihab Darwish became the first Emirati voting member of the Grammy Recording Academy.

== Albums ==
Album Waves of My Life. Every real story begins with a note (2018) contains nine musical pieces.

1. Beyond Limits - Abu Dhabi Renaissance
2. Chords of Reverie
3. Desert Knight
4. Lawlaki (Feat. Sammy Clark)
5. The Euphony
6. Arabesco
7. Waves of My Life
8. She
9. Lawlaki (Instrumental)

2nd Album Hekayat: Symphonic Tales (2020) contains 13 pieces:

1. Hekayat
2. Danza Del Sol
3. Across the Skies
4. New Moon
5. Ya Bahr
6. The Wanderer
7. Nova Duetto
8. Gazelle Eyes
9. Zahra
10. Galactic Hope
11. Serenade Of My Heart
12. New Dawn
13. Ensemble Of Peace

3rd Album Symphony of Three. Peace. Love. Tolerance contains 4 movements:

1. Earth by Ihab Darwish
2. Peace by David Shire
3. Love by John Debney
4. Tolerance by Ihab Darwish
