= Mehad Hamad =

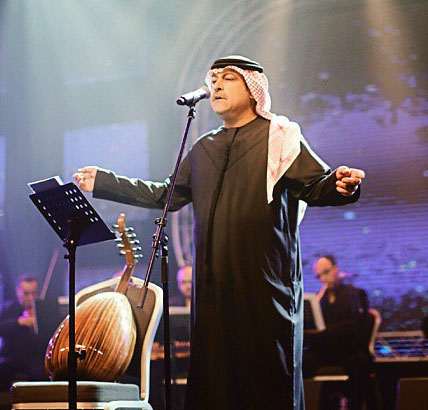
- Hamad performing in 2014

Background information
- Born: Mehad Hamad Mehad Mohammed; Kalba, Sharjah, United Arab Emirates
- Genres: Arabic music, Music of the United Arab Emirates
- Occupations: Singer-songwriter, musician
- Instruments: Vocals, poetry, composer
- Years active: 1978–present
- Website: www.mehadhamad.ae

Mehad Hamad Mehad Al Muhairi (Arabic: ميحد حمد ميحد المهيري) is a prominent Emirati singer-songwriter and musician known for his traditional and patriotic Arabic folk music. Born in Kalba, Sharjah. he has been active since the late 1970s and is celebrated for his deep, resonant voice and his performances on the oud. Over his long career, he has become a cultural icon in the United Arab Emirates, often singing about desert life, heritage, and national pride. Despite his fame, Hamad maintains a relatively private life and rarely gives interviews, focusing instead on his music and poetic lyrics. He continues to perform at major national events and remains a symbol i.e. Music of the United Arab Emirates.

== Career ==
Hamad mainly performs traditional Emirati songs, often accompanied by an oud. He is well known in the United Arab Emirates for his songs about the desert and for his patriotic songs.

Hamad has introduced new Khaliji-style songs, such as "Ya Habibi". He has also worked with Tyrese Gibson, and has set the words of Ousha bint Khalifa Al Suwaidi to music.

== Discography ==
=== Albums ===
- 2014: Ma Tardini Hudud

=== Top songs ===
- 2015: Laish Ana As'al
- 2014: Bargen Laa7
- 1999: Khams el 7awas
- 1998: Taal Laily
- 1997: mar7ba b6aresh
- 1997: 7ad methly
- 1996: yoom alwdaa3
- 1994: Tedalal
- 1992: La TeThaKeRny Be7BeK
- 1990: Wada3tkum
- 1989: Basmteek
- 1999: قزرت ليلي
