= Sandwash =

Rock band in the UAE (formed 2002)

- Also known as: The Savage Young Bucks
- Origin: Dubai, U.A.E.
- Genre: Hard rock
- Years active: 2002–present
- Label: Independent
- Members: Mike Fillon (Vocals/Guitars), Pavel Duzhnikov (Guitars), Jay Fillon (Drums/Vocals), Kristopher Opao (Bass)

Sandwash is the name of a rock band in the United Arab Emirates. Since its formation in 2002, the band has appeared on the cover of Time Out Dubai, received numerous airplays on UAE radio stations, been nominated in regional music award shows, and opened for various international acts, including Thirty Seconds to Mars, Maxïmo Park, and Simple Plan.

== History ==
=== The early years ===
The earliest incarnation of Sandwash was formed in the summer of 1999 when Michael (Mike) Fillon and his then 12-year-old brother Jay Fillon began writing songs together. The music was intended for submission to Square Japan as part of the then yet to be developed Final Fantasy animated feature film. But frustrated with the limited means to record music in Dubai, the brothers scrapped the project and the songs weren't recorded or performed until two years later.

In 2001, the Fillons put together a group and entered the Dubai College Battle of the Bands, the only major music event for young musicians in the country back then. This was the first time the band was billed as Sandwash. The line-up consisted of Mike Fillon on vocals and guitars, Jay Fillon on drums, Aristotle Tinio on guitars, and Cromwell Ojeda on bass. The band performed an original track called ‘Your World’ and received the ‘Best Vocalist’ award.

=== AUD and The Developing Dubai Rock Scene ===
In 2002, Mike Fillon was in his third year at The American University in Dubai (AED). There he formed The Sound Society, a youth collective that grouped the country's bands, organizers, music writers and followers. Among many events, the Sound Society organized the Turbulence music festival, an annual outdoor event that featured only unsigned bands from around the country.

The festival helped ignite the local music scene, and within months, other local rocks events started to emerge, among them the Revolution series and the Rage series. It was during this time that many of the UAE's most successful bands started to take shape, among them Nervecell, Abhorred, Liptrix, Juliana Down, and Mannikind.

With more constant gigs to play, Sandwash began to develop a more original, edgier punk sound, aided by a more aggressive rhythm section featuring Rami Mustafa on bass. But as the Dubai rock scene began to evolve, so too did the band's sound, until they became known for pioneering what came to be known as groovecore: a form of groovy rock characterized by vintage guitar riffs, modern metal dynamics and soaring sing-along choruses.

However, the new creative direction was not to the whole band's liking, and in the summer of 2002, Rami Mustafa left the band to take up guitar duty with death metal band Nervecell.

=== Mainstream attention and New Line-Ups ===
In 2003, Sandwash was featured in a Time Out Dubai article about the emerging local music scene. The band was placed on the cover of the magazine, under the headline ‘Definitely Local’. The picture was a spoof of Oasis’ Definitely Maybe album cover. Local radio station 99.3FM also picked up on the buzz, with DJ Irina Sherma inviting Sandwash and other local artists to guest on her weekly show. The station was the first to air the demo for ‘Maria’, which would eventually end up on Sandwash’ debut studio album seven years later.

With just Mike and Jay left from the original line-up, Sandwash recruited two new members – Pavel Duzhnikov (ex-Gone Deaf) on guitars and Sammer Khammash (ex-Python Surrender) on bass. The new line-up wrote many of Sandwash's current show staples, including ‘Hey Hey Hey’ and ‘If You Open It Up’.

In 2004, Khammash graduated from university and left the UAE. His replacement came in the form of original Sandwash bassist Cromwell Ojeda. This line-up was the longest-lasting for the band. But without local music labels (and hence no proper releases), expensive recording studios, and licensing laws that prevented local bands from regularly playing in clubs, the band struggled to keep going for the next four years, with rewards amounting to no more than performing unpaid shows to their growing student fan base around the country.

=== Master Blaster Hole ===
The recording sessions for the band's first studio album started in 2006. Without the support or financing from any label, the band recorded the album without knowing how to release the material once complete. But being able to get studio-quality recordings was made possible with the help of Mike Fillon's childhood friend Kiran Sequera, who earlier co-produced Nervecell's debut E.P.

Drums, bass and guitars were recorded in Sequera's home studio in Bur Dubai. The tracking of instruments took around a year to complete, with Kiran and the band all working full-time jobs during the day, and recording at night. In the summer of 2006, right after completing his drum tracks, Jay Fillon left for a vacation in Hong Kong. Within a few weeks, the band was told that he was staying out of the UAE for an indefinite period, citing personal reasons for his prolonged absence. The band did not notify their supporters. Instead, they carried on recording the album, laying the final touches on their carrier single ‘Alabaster’. In May 2007, the song was sent to all the radio stations in Dubai and immediately received continuous airplay. The song was later included in a compilation album released by LPM Voice Magazine in Atlanta, U.S.A., as well as the soundtrack for a Mountain Dew TV commercial.

In September that year, the three members reunited with Jay in Manila, Philippines for a two-week tour. The band played several club dates including a show at Saguijo with Sonic Boom productions. They also did several radio interviews, among them at the legendary and now defunct radio station NU107. When the band returned to Dubai, Jay stayed behind in Manila and once again, the band was without a drummer.

The music video for ‘Alabaster’ was shot by American director Steve Marino and was released online in late 2007. The video featured Josh Saldanha from "Empty Yard Experiment" on drums, even though the song featured Jay's recorded drum tracks.

In early 2008, Ojeda left the band, citing a desire to focus on other activities including event promoting with his local art collective Blacksheep. It was an amicable split, and even today, Ojeda occasionally plays with various members of the band as part of different side projects. In 2009, after three years of traveling around China, Hong Kong and Manila, Jay Fillon returned to the U.A.E., resuming his drum duties with the band. In March 2010, Sandwash opened for Maxïmo Park in an open field concert in Abu Dhabi attended by over 10,000 people – considered sizable by the country's standard.

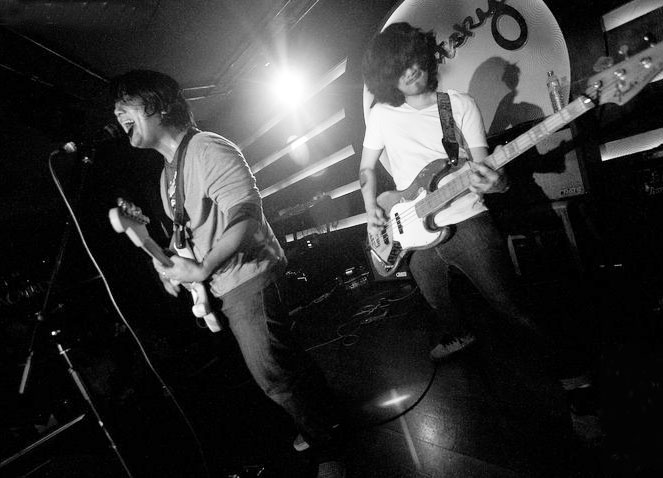
Mike Fillon with Kristopher Opao at a Blacksheep event in 2010

In November 2010, after four years of recording, mixing, mastering and numerous licensing paperwork (only two other bands, Juliana Down and Nervecell, had legally released studio albums by then), Sandwash finally released their debut album through Dubai-based distributor DAXAR. Titled ‘Master Blaster Hole’, the album featured 12 songs that spanned the band's long career, combining songs from their early groovecore days to more recent, experimental compositions such as ‘Let Tomorrow Wait’. The album was mixed and mastered by Milton Kyvernitiscredits, and was produced by Michael Fillon and Kiran Sequera. The album is currently available at Virgin Megastores in the U.A.E.

== Present ==
With Jay Fillon back on drums, and with new bassist Kristopher Opao, the band returned to the live circuit in late 2010 and have since been playing continuously around the country. In March, 2011, Sandwash was chosen to open for Thirty Seconds to Mars at a concert in Yas Island, Abu Dhabi.

The band are currently writing new material for their next album.
