= Dubai International Jazz Festival =

Annual music festival held in Dubai

Coordinates: 25°5′34″N 55°9′10″E

Dubai Jazz Festival
- Locations: Dubai, UAE
- Capacity: 15,000
- Organized by: Done Events (www.doneevents.com)
- Website: www.dubaijazzfest.com

The Dubai International Jazz Festival is an annual music festival in Dubai, United Arab Emirates, held in February.

== 2011 Dubai International Jazz Festival ==
The 2011 Dubai International Jazz Festival was held between 16 and 24 February 2011 at Dubai Media City and featured the following performers:

- 16 February 2011: Mica Paris, Alison Moyet, Jools Holland
- 17 February 2011: Mindi Abair & Peter White, Macy Gray, Lifehouse
- 18 February 2011: Jessy J, Joshua Radin, Train

== 2012 Dubai International Jazz Festival ==
The 2012 Dubai International Jazz Festival was held between 16 and 24 February 2012 at the Festival Park at the Dubai Festival City. It featured the following performers:

- 16 February 2012: Michael Roach, Acoustic Alchemy, James Blunt
- 17 February 2012: Jimmy Thomas & Samantha Antoinette, Jonathan Butler, Jools Holland And His Rhythm & Blues Orchestra, Mezzotono
- 23 February 2012: Sandi Thom, Spyro Gyra, Jason Mraz
- 24 February 2012: Dirty Robbers, Brett Dennen, James Morrison

== 2016 Dubai International Jazz Festival ==
The 2016 Dubai International Jazz Festival was held between 24 and 26 February 2012 at the Festival Park at the Dubai Festival City. It featured the following performers:

- 24 February 2016: Scott Bradlee's Postmodern Jukebox, James
- 25 February 2016: David Gray, Toto, Chris Botti feat Sting
- 26 February 2016: La Bomba de Tiempo, Santana

== See also ==
- Music of the United Arab Emirates
- Dubai Desert Rock Festival
