= Shō (given name) =

- Gender: Male (with a few exceptions)

Origin
- Origin: Japanese

Shō, Sho or Shou is a masculine Japanese given name. Notable people with the name include:

- Akiko Yosano (与謝野 晶子, 1878-1942), Japanese author. Her birth name was "Shō Hō" (鳳 志よう)
- Sho Araki (荒木 翔; born 1995), Japanese footballer
- Sho Endo (遠藤 尚; born 1990), Japanese freestyle skier
- Sho Kosugi (ショー・コスギ, born 1948), Japanese martial artist and actor
- Show Hayami (速水 奨, born 1958), Japanese voice actor and singer
- Sho Hirano (平野 紫耀; born 1997), Japanese idol and actor
- Shō Ishikawa (石川 翔; born 1999), Japanese baseball player
- Sho Ito (伊藤 翔; born 1988), Japanese footballer
- Sho Kimura (木村 翔; born 1988), Japanese boxer
- Sho Nakata (中田 翔, born 1989), Japanese baseball player
- Sun Yat-sen (孫 逸仙, 1866–1925), a.k.a. "Nakayama Shō" (中山 樵)
- Sho Sakai (坂井 丞; born 1992), Japanese diver
- Sho Sakurai (櫻井 翔, born 1982), Japanese idol, singer-songwriter, and newscaster
- Sho Shimada (嶋田 翔; born 1998), stage name Lien, Japanese idol, member of South Korean boy band Mirae
- Sho Sotodate (外舘 祥; born 1991), Japanese swimmer
- Sho Tanaka (田中 翔; born 1989), Japanese professional wrestler
- Sho Yano (矢野 祥, born 1991), American child prodigy
- Shō Kiryūin (鬼龍院 翔, born 1984) Japanese singer and songwriter, member of Japanese rock band Golden Bomber
- Sho Yonashiro (與那城 奨, born 1995), Japanese idol, member of JO1
- Sho Watanabe (渡辺翔), Japanese wheelchair racer

== Fictional characters ==
- Ginzu the Ninja or Sho, a character in Captain Commando video game
- Sho, a protagonist of the 2002 video game Crimson Sea
- Syoh from Tuff E Nuff (Dead Dance)
- Genocide Jack (Genocider Syo), a character in Danganronpa: Trigger Happy Havoc
- Shou Amabane, the player character in Burning Rangers
- Shou Ashikawa, a character in Machine Robo Rescue
- Shō Fukamachi, the protagonist character of Bio Booster Armor Guyver
- Sho Hayate, a character in Dengeki Sentai Changeman
- Shō Kazamatsuri, the main character in Whistle!
- Syo Kurusu (来栖 翔), the main character in the Uta no Prince-sama franchise
- Sho Marufuji (Syrus Truesdale), a character in Yu-Gi-Oh! GX
- Sho Minamimoto, an antagonist in The World Ends with You video game
- Sho Minazuki, a fighter in Persona 4: The Ultimax Ultra Suplex Hold
- Sho Shinjo, a character in the Battle Arena Toshinden fighting game series
- Sho Takamatsu, a character from The Drifting Classroom
- Shou Tatsumi, a character in Kyuukyuu Sentai GoGoFive
- Shou Toramaru, a character in Undefined Fantastic Object from the Touhou Project series
- Sho Tsukioka (月岡 彰), a character in the novel, manga, and film Battle Royale
- Shou Tucker, a character in Fullmetal Alchemist
- Shō Utsumi (内海 将), a character in the anime series SSSS.Gridman
- Shō Kusakabe, a character from the anime and manga series Fire Force
- Xiao, a playable Anemo character in Genshin Impact, read as Shō (魈) in Japanese

== See also ==
- Masatoshi Ono (小野 正利, born 1967), Japanese rock/heavy metal singer, nicknamed "Sho"
- Sho (disambiguation)
