= Abu Dhabi Music & Arts Foundation =

Cultural foundation based in Abu Dhabi

- مجموعة أبوظبي للثقافة والفنون
- Abbreviation: ADMAF
- Formation: 1996 (30 years ago)
- Type: Foundation
- Headquarters: Abu Dhabi, Emirate of Abu Dhabi, United Arab Emirates
- Coordinates: 24°29′40″N 54°22′51″E
- Region served: Emirate of Abu Dhabi
- Founder: Huda Al Khamis Kanoo
- Executive Director: Michel El Gemayel
- Website: admaf.org

The Abu Dhabi Music & Arts Foundation is an organisation based in Abu Dhabi, It was established in 1996 by Huda Al Khamis Kanoo.

== Abu Dhabi Festival ==
The ADMAF organizes the Abu Dhabi Festival, an annual cultural festival.

== See also ==
- Abu Dhabi#Culture
- Culture of the United Arab Emirates
