= Shō (surname) =

Shō, Shou or Sho (written: 荘 or 尚) is a Japanese surname. Notable people with the surname include:

- Hiroshi Shō (尚 裕, 1918–1996)
- Mayumi Shō (荘 真由美, born 1965), Japanese actress
