= Dubai Desert Rock Festival =

Event celebrating various styles of rock and metal music

- Dubai Desert Rock Fest
- Genre: Rock, metal
- Dates: March
- Locations: Dubai, United Arab Emirates
- Years active: 2004–2009
- Founders: Center Stage Management

The Dubai Desert Rock Festival was an event celebrating various styles of rock and metal music on one stage in Dubai, United Arab Emirates. Originally a one-day festival, it was expanded to two days in 2007 and 2008, before its eventual cancellation after the 2009 event. Main Event includes Rock and Metal Music which is played in the Middle of Desert of Dubai. Dubai government authorized it. The festival also Includes off-roading, food and dune buggy rentals.

== History ==
=== 2004 ===
The headliner, Limp Bizkit cancelled their appearance 48 hours before the show, allegedly because frontman Fred Durst felt “unsafe” travelling to the region.

=== 2005 ===
Dubai Desert Rock developed into a full-day festival and featured rock bands from around the world, including Machine Head, Sepultura, Within Temptation, and headliners The Darkness. Saxon were scheduled to appear but were forced to cancel due to a family emergency. Frontman Biff Byford appeared via video to explain the situation and assured fans that they would be there for next year's festival.

=== 2006 ===
The Line-up for this year on March 18 included:

- Mannikind
- Reel Big Fish
- Testament
- 3 Doors Down
- Megadeth

=== 2007 ===
For the 2007 installment of Dubai Desert Rock Festival the following bands performed:

March 9:

- Iron Maiden
- The Prodigy
- Stone Sour
- In Flames
- Mastodon
- Lauren Harris
- Junkyard Groove

March 10:

- Robert Plant and the Strange Sensation
- Incubus
- The Bravery
- Prime Circle
- Junkyard Groove

=== 2008 ===
The year 2008 marked the festival's 5th anniversary and was the biggest rock festival to be held in Dubai to date. The festival was held in Dubai Festival City. There was a 50m suspended bar in the air as a world premiere.

March 7:

- Korn
- Machine Head
- Killswitch Engage
- As I Lay Dying
- Nervecell
- Slapshock
- The Galeej Gurus (Shamal winner)

March 8:

- Muse
- Velvet Revolver
- Marky Ramone
- Juliana Down
- Spoon Feedas
- The Galeej Gurus (Shamal winner)

=== 2009 ===
Dubai Desert Rock Festival 2009 took place at Dubai Festival City on March 6. The event was a one-day affair (in contrast to the previous two editions) and focused on heavy metal. Opeth, Chimaira, Arch Enemy, August Burns Red and Nervecell performed, with Motörhead headlining.

Line-up (2009):

- Motörhead
- Arch Enemy
- Opeth
- Chimaira
- August Burns Red
- Nervecell
- Scarab
- Hatred
- metaphysics

=== 2010 ===
In February 2010, the organisers of the Dubai Desert Rock Festival (Center Stage Management) announced that they were not going to be holding the festival, in an effort to 'extend the reach of the company'.

CSM's Managing Director, explained:

“This decision was not taken lightly and was well thought-through with my team in my company’s best interests. It marks the beginning of a new era for CSM, a human-sized yet international entertainment-specialized company, which I’ve chosen to grow beyond UAE boundaries. I have focused uniquely on the Middle East in the past 10 years, which has positioned CSM to build a credible and reputable name; it’s now time to take it to another level. We’ve always taken pride in producing top-quality events which is why in order to develop my company in a professional manner (to equal its standards), we will focus on our international projects and artist management, until further notice”.

== See also ==
- Rock festivals
- Global Metal
- Music of the United Arab Emirates
