= Nasser Hassan Al-Shaikh =

- Born: May 22, 1971 (age 54); Dubai, United Arab Emirates
- Occupation: Businessman

H.E. Nasser Hassan Al-Shaikh was, until 19 May 2009, Director General of Department of Finance, Government of Dubai.

== Career ==
On 19 May 2009, in a shock move, H.E. Nasser Al-Shaikh was moved to the post of Assistant Director of the Rulers Court for Foreign Affairs. He resigned on June 21, 2009 from the chairmanship of Deyaar Development PJSC and on June 22, 2009 from the chairmanship of Taaleem PJSC, vice-chairmanship of National Bonds Corporation PJSC and the board of directors of Dubai Islamic Bank PJSC. Later on June 23, 2009 it was announced that he was relieved from all Government posts including his new role in the Dubai Ruler's Court.

His exit, for which no reason was given, shook the business community as he had been seen as one of the key architects of Dubai's efforts to deal with the fallout from the 2008 financial crisis, which severely affected the emirate's economy.

Just days before being replaced, Al-Shaikh was speaking at the World Economic Forum in Jordan about how the second $10 billion tranche would be distributed. A few weeks prior he also spoke in depth about the economic situation during an exclusive interview on Dubai Eye 103.8's The Business Breakfast.
