= Esther Eden =

Indian singer-songwriter (born 1997)

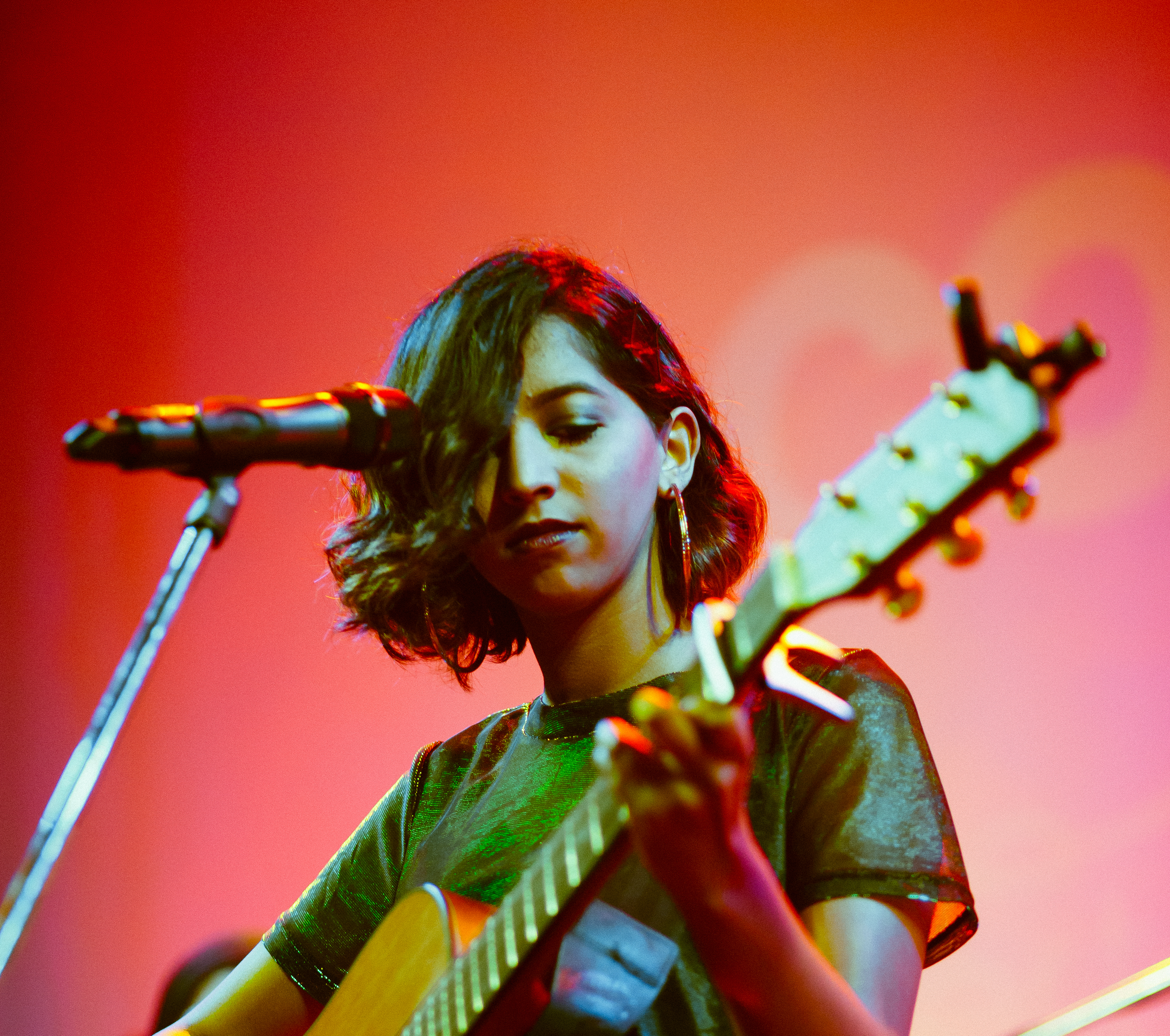
- Fernandes in 2017

Background information
- Born: Esther Eden Fernandes; 26 November 1997 (age 28); Goa, India
- Origin: Dubai, United Arab Emirates
- Genres: Pop, Dance music, Folk and Jazz
- Occupations: Singer, songwriter
- Years active: 2014–present
- Label: Universal Music
- Website: esthereden.com

Esther Eden Fernandes (born 26 November 1997) is an Indian singer-songwriter based in Dubai, United Arab Emirates. She rose to fame in 2014 when singer Jessie J invited her to perform at her concert at the Red Fest DXB. In 2016, as an independent artist she premiered her debut single "Phoenix".

== Personal life ==
Eden was born in Goa, India, and moved to the UAE when she was 7 months old and has lived there ever since. She pursued BA in songwriting at BIMM, Berlin.

== Career ==
In 2014, British singer Jessie J visited Al Diyafah High School where Esther Eden was studying and watched Eden perform an original song. She then invited Eden to perform at her concert at the Red Fest DXB and within a few hours Eden was performing for a crowd of over 10,000 people. Eden was invited to participate in the pilot series of "Inspired" created by White Cube Studios Abu Dhabi. Eden was also invited to speak for a TedX event in Dubai, where she spoke about how music can help a student.

Her music got the attention of the major music label Universal Music MENA and on 5 November 2015, Eden signed a recording contract with UMM. Jessie J even tweeted to the young teen saying 'how proud she was'

Eden went on to perform for the Red Fest DXB in February 2016 in her own strength as an independent artist and premiered her debut single "Phoenix" for a crowd of around 15,000 people, and alongside Fifth Harmony, LMFAO, Trey Songz and Adam Lambert. Phoenix was subsequently released in February 2016, produced by Joshua Williams. She was part of the Red Bull Bass camp in Feb 2016.

The song that Eden performed for Jessie J was released in May 2016 and was titled "Is this love" which hit the UK Music Week charts. The music video was released in August 2016. This song was produced by White Cube Studios, Abu Dhabi. Her next single 'Here we go' was released on 28 October 2016 which was a collaboration with Shaun Warner. She went on to perform for the Beats on the Beach 2016, alongside Big Sean and Sean Paul.

Eden has been nominated for an award in the "Young Achiever" category for the Emirates Woman 'Woman Of The Year' Awards 2016.

She performed for Step Music Fest with other regional acts in April 2017. Eden was named the Brand Ambassador for Sennheiser in the Middle East in March 2017. Eden's next single 'Blue Case' was released in 2018.

== Discography ==
=== Singles ===
- "Phoenix" (25 February 2016)
- "Is this love" (12 May 2016)
- "Here we go" (28 October 2016)
- "BitterSweet" Love" (30 June 2017)
- "Blue Case" (2018)
- "Calm before the Storm" (2019)
- "My Own Way" (2019)
- "Easy" (2019)

=== Album ===
- Solitaire (18 November 2016)- Universal Music MENA
- My Own Way (2020)- Universal Music MENA
