= Naser Mestarihi EP =

EP by Naser Mestarihi
- Released: 31 December 2010
- Recorded: Doha, Qatar, December 2009–January 2010
- Genre: Heavy metal, hard rock
- Length: 26:12
- Language: English
- Label: Interscope Digital Distribution
- Producer: Bader Al Sada & Naser Mestarihi (co-producer)

Naser Mestarihi chronology
Naser Mestarihi EP (2010)	1987 (2013)

Singles from Naser Mestarihi EP
- 1. "Phoenix"; 2. "Salvation"

Professional ratings
Review scores
Source	Rating
Rolling Stone	2.5/5 stars
Sur la Terre	4/5 stars

Naser Mestarihi EP is the debut EP of Doha based heavy metal/hard rock guitarist Naser Mestarihi. The release of the album marked the first official release of a rock album out of Qatar. All the lyrics and music on the album were written by Mestarihi, who also plays all the instruments with the exception of the drums.

== Music ==
Mestarihi has described the album as a "cathartic output which helps people deal with difficult issues." Most of the lyrics and subject themes on the album are introspective and deal with overcoming turmoil by conveying a positive and uplifting message.

== Track listing ==
All lyrics are written by Naser Mestarihi; all music is composed by Naser Mestarihi.

No.	Title	Length
1.	"Phoenix"	6:17
2.	"Blazing Temple"	6:00
3.	"Salvation"	4:13
4.	"Astral Voyager"	9:42
Total length:		26:12

== Release ==
The album was released on December 31, 2010. Upon its release, the album received positive critical reviews, with Rolling Stone magazine's Anthony McGregor describing it as a "Technically profficient [sic] EP". Additionally, it was hailed as a "huge sounding impressive debut." The album also received a positive review by Sur la Terre magazine in which Mestarihi's guitar playing was described as "guttural riffs threaded beautifully, if not maniacally, with the screeching whine of fast licks." In the same review his playing is described as "almost computerised-sounding builds that you can't help but double-back on and listen to over and over again."

== Personnel ==
- Naser Mestarihi - lead and backing vocals, lead guitars, rhythm guitars, acoustic guitars and bass guitar.
- Ateek Chima - drums

Production

- Bader Al Sada - Producer, engineer.
- Naser Mestarihi - Co-producer (musical arrangements).
