= Hamdan Al Abri =

Emirati singer, songwriter

Hamdan Al Abri (born 18 April 1981 in Dubai) is a singer and songwriter and one of the founders and front man of Dubai-based soul band ABRI. Abri began singing at a young age and started his career working alongside numerous groups and bands in Dubai and abroad. Abri and the band released two widely acclaimed albums in relatively quick succession: Sunchild & Blank Notes. ABRI toured through India, Bahrain, UK, the Maldives & the U.A.E and performed alongside Erykah Badu, Ziggy Marley, Arrested Development, Kanye West and Joss Stone.

At the end of 2009 when ABRI band member Julian Symes moved to Brazil and Andre Artherley moved to the UK, Abri decided to work on his solo career. He has since released his self-titled solo debut EP.

His first single "(Re) Birth" has been aired on the hit US TV show C.S.I, (Season 12, Episode 3 "Bittersweet") and its subsequent single "Falling" has been aired on Sarah Michelle Gellar’s new US TV show Ringer (Season 1, Episode 7).

== Early life ==
Hamdan Al-Abri was born in the United Arab Emirates on the 18th of April, 1981. His parents, Mukrim Al Abri, a Zanzibari musician, and Fatma Mattar Tajir, a doctor of Ugandan, Comorian, and Indian background, married and moved to the UAE in the late 1960s.

Music played a prominent role in Hamdan’s upbringing. His father is a Zanzibari musician who played Taarab music: an African music genre with a mixture of Arabic and Indian influences. Mukrim performed widely in Zanzibar. He sang and played the guitar, bass guitar, keyboard, and the French accordion. Hamdan studied at the International School of Choueifat in Sharjah, where his classmates encouraged him to join the music club.

After completing school in 2001 he moved to Miami and studied at the Miami International University of Art and Design. While in college, he joined a rock band called Plex, in which he sang leading vocals.

When Hamdan returned to Dubai he decided to dedicate all his effort into being a full-time musician.

== Career ==
In October 2005 Hamdan and Julian Symes formed the soul band ABRI. Hamdan sang leading vocals and Symes played the keyboard. Justin Atherley joined as the bassist and his brother Andre Atherley later joined as the drummer. Justin was replaced by Rami Lakkis when he went back to the UK. Abri released their first album Sunchild in 2006 consisting of 12 tracks.

The album was written by Hamdan, with the exception of "Back to the Sun", which was written by Julian Symes who also produced the album. Sunchild put Abri on the frontline of the UAE's music scene where their songs were played on local radio stations. Abri began to perform live in venues across the country. ABRI was later nominated for MTV Arabia’s best new act and won a number of local awards.

In 2009 ABRI released their second album Blank Notes remaking six of the tracks from Sunchild. The album had 12 tracks in total. Blank Notes was sold at Virgin Megastores in the Middle East and was distributed by Music Master.

=== 2009 ===
At the end of 2009 founding member Julian Symes moved to Brazil and drummer Andre Atherley moved back to the UK.

With half the band members gone, Hamdan decided it was time to start working on his solo career. Despite numerous media reports that the band split up, Hamdan insists that the band is just in a hiatus.

=== 2010 ===
Hamdan moved to the UK for 8 months to work on his solo music career. There he met with British producer Yasser Anderson aka Dozing Duke, and together they worked on 3 of the 5 tracks in the EP.

=== 2011 ===
In October Hamdan released his self-titled solo debut EP containing five tracks, all written by Hamdan Al Abri. In the solo EP, Hamdan moved away from the Jazzy/Funk style of ABRI towards more of an experimental, electronic approach. The EP consisted of 5 tracks:

1. Here
2. Life
3. (Re) Birth
4. The Yearning
5. Falling

Hamdan took a shot at production for the first time with The Yearning. He also co-produced Here with his former band member Rami Lakkis. The rest of the tracks were produced by Yasser Anderson aka Dozing Duke.

== EP Reviews ==
Rolling Stone

"Whether he’s soaring over grubby bass on "LIFE" or fading in and out of the sound scape on "The Yearning," he sounds like nobody else."

Soulbounce.com

"So don't delay, head on over and download one of the best EPs (free or otherwise) that has dropped this year."

Infusion Magazine

"He could make a funeral march sound toe tapping, so why should we expect anything else. Next Level music."

Triple W

"Hamdan’s first solo effort is a beautifully crafted EP, which ticks all the right boxes in coherence, vision and appeal."

== Influences ==
Hamdan attributes his love for music to Michael Jackson. Other artists that influenced his career are: Bob Marley, Sam Cooke, Stevie Wonder, Maxwell, Musiq SoulChild, David Bowie, Iggy Pop, Radiohead, Björk, Flying Lotus, D’Angelo, Erykah Badu, and Bilal.

== Performances ==
Hamdan opened for a number of international artists including: Sade, Erykah Badu, Ziggy Marley, Joss Stone, Kanye West, Timbaland, Arrested Development, and Shaggy.

In 2012, Hamdan sang in London in the lead up to the London Olympics where over 25,000 artists from participating nations performed. Hamdan teamed up with Transglobal Underground and other Middle Eastern artists to perform for ‘BT River of Music’ at Battersea Park. He also performed at WOMAD Abu Dhabi, WOMAD Al Ain, Beats on the Beach (part of the Etihad Airways Abu Dhabi Formula 1 Grand Prix line-up) and Dubai's Chill Out Festival. Hamdan has performed in the UAE, London, Maldives, Bahrain, India, Lebanon, and Qatar.

== Awards and nominations ==
2012 Second Best selling UAE act – Timeout Dubai.

2011 Best Local Band, Timeout Dubai Nightlife Awards.

2008 Nominated for Best New Act – MTV Europe Music Awards

2022 Winner - Emirati Artist of the Year, 3rd Musivv Awards

== Music videos ==
ABRI debuted their first music video for the song Philosophies in 2006. In 2008 they released their second music video A Piece of Yourself. Both videos were played on MTV Arabia.

In 2012 Hamdan released his first solo music video for the song Falling.

All his music videos were shot in the UAE.

== Other ==
Hamdan has been on the Cover of Rolling Stone Middle East, and TimeOut Dubai. He was reviewed by the music blog SoulBounce and was interviewed by BBC News for his performance with Transglobal Underground in the lead up to the 2012 London Olympics
