= 1987 (Naser Mestarihi album) =

Studio album by Naser Mestarihi
- Released: 17 June 2013 - 2 August 2013 - 17 February 2014
- Recorded: November 2011–October 2012 Dubai, UAE
- Genres: Heavy metal, hard rock
- Length: 41:48
- Language: English
- Labels: Interscope Digital Distribution, Music Box International
- Producer: Naser Mestarihi

Naser Mestarihi chronology
Naser Mestarihi EP (2010)	1987 (2013)

Singles from 1987
- 1. "Exodus Highway"; 2. "1987"

Professional ratings
Review scores
Source	Rating
Rolling Stone	3/5 stars
Fact (Bahrain)	Favourable

1987 is the full-length debut of Doha/Dubai based Heavy metal/Hard rock singer-songwriter Naser Mestarihi. The album was released on June 17, 2013.

== Production ==
All the lyrics and music on the album were composed by Naser, who was also in charge of musical arrangements as well as all the performances minus the drums. The drum tracks were recorded by Travis Marc in London, England and mixed in Dubai.

Naser has described the album as a difficult and daunting project which delayed the release on several occasions due to the difficulty of working with his engineer. He has stated that the album contains some political elements in the lyrical content.

== Release ==
The album's launch party took place in Dubai at The Music Room with supporting acts Nikotin and Kicksound on May 3 2013. The official release took place on June 17, 2013, with a worldwide online release on iTunes, August 2 in record stores Qatar and February 17, 2014, in the United Arab Emirates and Bahrain. The first single "Exodus Highway" was made available for free download on SoundCloud ahead of the release.

== Reception ==
The album has received favourable reviews from the regional press. Rolling Stone magazine's Helen McDonald rating it three out of five stars. McDonald described the album as a "fun, if one-paced record, with genuinely impressive moments." McDonald also praises Naser's commitment "wailing & shredding histrionically."

In a separate review on the first single "Exodus Highway" McDonald praises Naser's "undoubted instrumental ability and his impressive vocal chops (unleashing some eye-watering higher-register wails)."

The National (Abu Dhabi), one of the United Arab Emirates' leading newspapers, also gave the album a positive review with entertainment writer Saeed Saeed stating that the album is "a throwback to the era’s melodic hard rock and hair metal: tracks such as 'Blazing Temple' recall the driving riffs of Mötley Crüe while Mestarihi’s full-throated wail in 'Exodus Highway' echoes the vocal acrobatics of Iron Maiden’s Bruce Dickinson."

Fact Magazine (Bahrain) also gave the album a positive review describing "Exodus Highway" as "Hair-raising," highlighting Mestarihi's guitar playing "his guitar technique is insanely good!" and his singing, calling his falsettos "sick". Songs like "Wovoka," "The Road Home," and "Emerald" were pointed out as standout tracks, comparing the album's overall sound to bands like Aerosmith and AC/DC.

== Track listing ==
All lyrics are written by Naser Mestarihi; all music is composed by Naser Mestarihi.

No.	Title	Length
1.	"Intro"	0:33
2.	"Blazing Temple"	5:57
3.	"Exodus Highway"	4:16
4.	"1987"	5:42
5.	"Phoenix"	6:28
6.	"The Road Home"	4:49
7.	"Wovoka"	5:54
8.	"Emerald"	8:04
Total length:		40:13

== Personnel ==
- Naser Mestarihi - lead & backing vocals, lead guitars, rhythm guitars, twelve-string guitars & bass guitar.
- Travis Marc - Percussions

Production

- Naser Mestarihi - Producer.
- Dylan Ellis - engineer

Additional Personnel

- Sarah Mestarihi - Artwork.
