= Naser Mestarihi =

Qatar musician

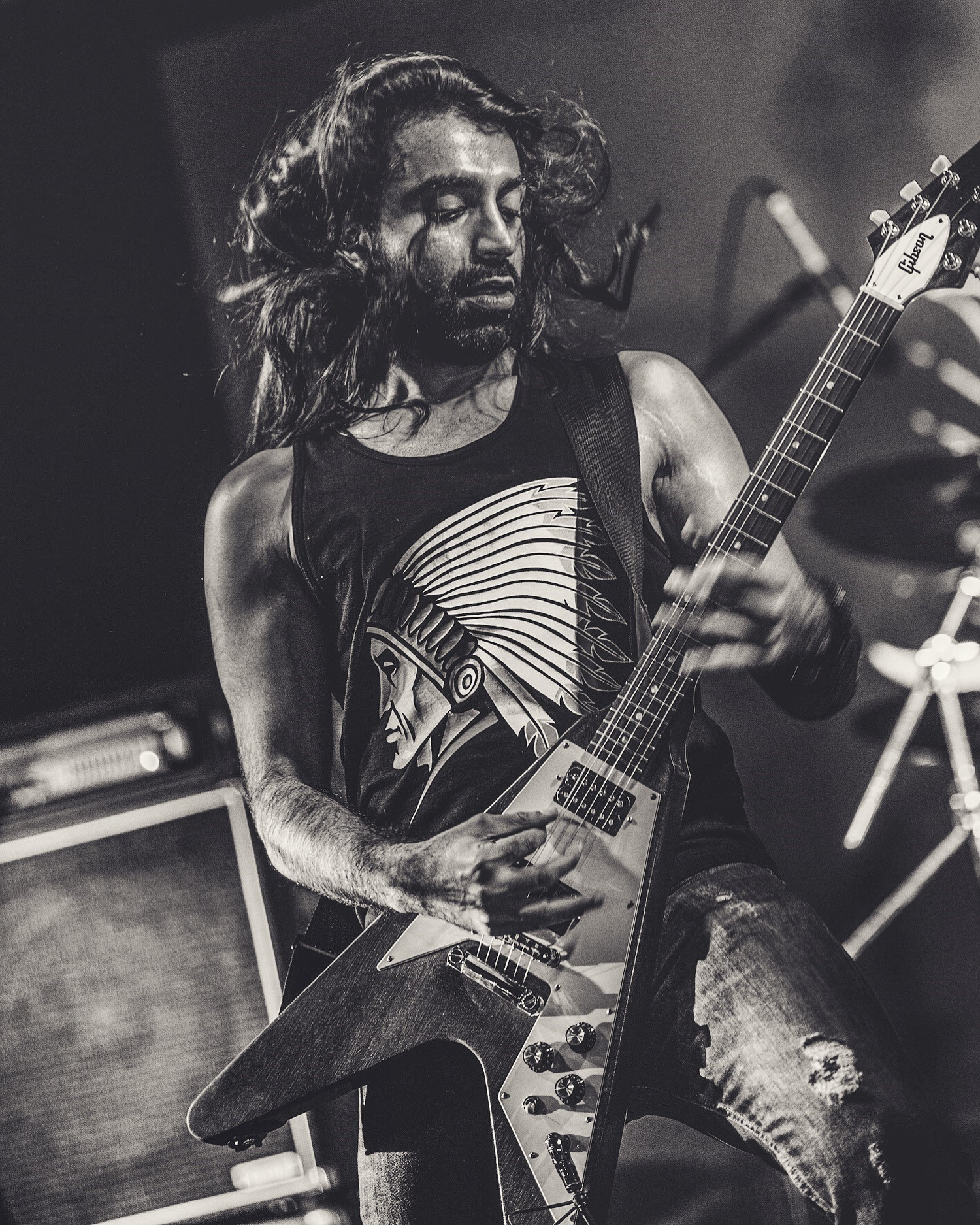
- Mestarihi live at the Middle East Comi Con 2018

Background information
- Born: Naser Shaher Saleh Mestarihi; 14 October 1987 (age 38); Doha, Qatar
- Genres: Heavy metal, hard rock, acoustic
- Occupations: Musician, songwriter, producer, session musician
- Instruments: Guitar, vocals, bass
- Years active: 2004–present
- Website: nasermestarihi.com

Naser Mestarihi (Arabic: ناصر شاهر صالح المستريحي; born 14 October 1987) is a Qatari singer-songwriter and multi-instrumentalist (guitars, bass and vocals) based in Dubai, United Arab Emirates. Mestarihi is the first rock musician to ever officially release a rock album out of his birthplace Qatar, the Naser Mestarihi EP. He released his second album 1987 on 17 June 2013.

== Early life ==
Mestarihi was born and raised in Doha, Qatar, by a Jordanian father and a Pakistani mother. His paternal uncles are all professional musicians. He states that his introduction to music came through his parents who gave him his first rock albums. He also states that the album that inspired him to pursue a career in music was Guns N' Roses debut album Appetite for Destruction. Although a self taught player, his mother enrolled him in a music school but he quit shortly after due to his lack of interest.

== Career ==
Mestarihi began performing live at the age of 17. He had minor international exposure two years later when he was featured on a Danmarks Radio documentary in 2006 which was broadcast in Denmark and Scandinavia.

Naser began his solo career in 2007, performing a handful of shows in the United Arab Emirates as a solo artist and a session musician. Some of his first notable shows included performing at the United States Military Base Camp As Siliyah in his hometown of Doha, where he performed on the 4 and 5 July to mark the U.S. Independence Day celebrations with other local bands. He also made his radio debut around this time on Qatar's QBS Radio. This was followed by the launch of his first solo single "Salvation" in September 2009 on the station.

His self-titled debut the Naser Mestarihi EP was released on 31 December 2010, making it the first official rock record ever to be released out of Qatar. Although the album did not yield any commercial success it received some critical acclaim from regional publications including Rolling Stone Middle East who hailed it as "A huge sounding impressive debut."

Mestarihi composes all his music and lyrics (including drums) and is known for his meticulous recording approach recording every instrument's track on his record with the exception of the drums.

Naser released his second album 1987 on 17 June 2013 worldwide and 2 August regionally. The album's first single "Exodus Highway" receiving a positive review in the May 2013 issue of Rolling Stone magazine prior to the album's release. The album was well received by regional publications including "Rolling Stone" magazine.

He followed the release with his second full-length album “Praed Street” featuring drummer Cobus Potgieter in March 2016.

He achieved a moment with his band Winterburn by performing as the opening act for the Guns N’ Roses concert in Bahrain in May 2025. The band also performed in Saudi Arabia and Abu Dhabi as part of their series of shows in the Gulf region.

== Influences ==
Mestarihi has cited many bands as influences on his music, his favourite band is Guns N' Roses however he has also cited classic rock bands such as Van Halen, Black Sabbath, Led Zeppelin, Thin Lizzy, The Who and Queen as his main influences.

Other genres Mestarihi states he enjoys listening to include Funk, new wave and punk. He cites Eddie Van Halen, Jimi Hendrix, Randy Rhoads, Michael Schenker, Jake E. Lee and Slash as some of his favourite guitarists.

== Personal life ==
Mestarihi is a former student of Middlesex University. He has obsessive–compulsive disorder.

He is also an avid West Ham United fan.

== Discography ==
Solo Studio albums

- Naser Mestarihi EP (2010)
- 1987 (2013)
- Praed Street (2016)

Studio albums with Winterburn

- Ivory Towers (TBC 2021)
