= Sho? =

- Origin: Dubai, United Arab Emirates
- Genres: Rock, alternative, punk, electronica
- Years active: June 2009–January 2011
- Past members: Zara Quiroga; Rizal Khan; Eric Quay Evano; Fabrizio 'Fab' Benefazio; Justin Blincoe; Karim El Gamal; Branislav 'Bane' Trkulja

Sho? was a Dubai-based band whose music combined rock, alternative, punk and electronica. Made up of expatriates, they were active in the Dubai rock music scene for about eighteen months. They released one Internet-only single, "Crash" (April 2010) and one EP, I Don't Wanna Go (August 2010). Their name was a version of the Arabic word "Sho", which roughly translates into English as "What". The band officially announced their dissolution in January 2011.

== Biography ==
Sho? was formed in June 2009 by Zara Quiroga and Rizal Khan, who met via an online music forum. Eric Quay Evano (who later joined Borrison Ivy, then Moonshine), Fabrizio 'Fab' Benefazio, Justin Blincoe (who went on to join Colorado-based band Left Foot Green), Karim El Gamal and Branislav 'Bane' Trkulja also served brief stints in the band.

=== Principle band members ===
==== Zara Quiroga ====
Zara Quiroga was the lead vocalist and only female member of the band. Of Portuguese and Spanish descent, she undertook several years of vocal training prior to performing with Sho?. She had also previously appeared as a vocalist on the 2006 album release Project Creation – Dawn On Pyther by Portuguese multi-instrumentalist Hugo Flores.

==== Rizal Khan ====
Khan, born in Malaysia, was the lead guitarist in Sho?. Previously, Khan had performed with the Malaysian bands Dust Components (1995–1997), Burial Ground (1997–1999) and Morphed Assembly (2000).

== Musical performances ==
Sho? performed regularly at various rock music events in Dubai and Abu Dhabi, such as Metal Asylum, Black Sheep, Rock Nation and Yasalam Beats on the Beach.

=== Diesel U-Music Tour ===
In 2009 Sho? won the Road to Sound City competition, which was judged by Gary Dourdan and Kim Thompson alongside representatives from Diesel, Sennheiser and EMI Arabia. This allowed Sho? to perform on the main stage for the Dubai Sound City festival and to be part of the Diesel U-Music World Tour, which took them to Vienna, Austria in November 2009.

== Press coverage ==
Articles about Sho? appeared in various UAE newspapers and magazines, including the Khaleej Times, The National, 7 Days, Gulf News and Rolling Stone Middle East. In February 2010 the band was shortlisted by Dubai's Time Out magazine in the "Best Local Band" category for 2010, and the band members attended the awards ceremony at the Atlantis Hotel. On 5 April 2010, Sho? were featured on the Dubai One TV show Twenty Something. The band broke up less than a year later.

== Discography ==
- "Crash" – single (download only, April 2010)

- This track also appeared on the compilation CD UAE Metal Asylum (July 2010)

- I Don't Wanna Go – EP (download and CD, August 2010)

- Contains four tracks: "Sho?", "Crash", "P(h)ride" and "Winter"

- Acoustic Session (#1) – Recorded for Saturday Extra with John Deykin on Dubai Eye 103.8 (6 March 2010)
- Acoustic Session (#2) – Recorded for Open Mic with Zahra Soar on Dubai Eye 103.8 (17 April 2010)
