= RedfestDXB =

Music festival in Dubai

RedFestDXB
- Company type: Music Festival
- Founded: 2014
- Area served: GCC
- Website: www.redfestdxb.com

RedfestDXB is a music festival organized by Done Events that began in 2013 and takes place annually at the Dubai Media City Amphitheatre.

== Line ups ==
This list contains the line ups for all the artists that have performed in the music festival till date.

=== RedfestDXB 2014 ===
==== February 13, 2014 ====
- Jessie J
- Tinie Tempah
- Conor Maynard
- Marvin Humes

==== February 14, 2014 ====
- The Lumineers
- John Newman
- Rita Ora
- Naughty Boy
- A-Yo
- Mark Ronson
- Zane Lowe

=== RedfestDXB 2015 ===
- The Script
- Iggy Azalea
- Kid Ink
- Bastille
- Kiesza
- Jeremih
- Tinashe
- Ella Eyre
- G.R.L.
- Cris Cab
- Rixton

Closing set DJs

- Gordon City DJ
- Wilkinson

=== RedfestDXB 2016 ===
==== February 11, 2016 ====
- Steve Aoki
- Rita Ora
- Dawin
- Nathalie Saba
- The Vamps
- Grace

==== February 12, 2016 ====
- Fifth Harmony
- Adam Lambert
- Redfoo
- Trey Songz
- MistaJam
- Eva Simons

=== RedfestDXB 2017 ===
==== February 2, 2017 ====
- G-Eazy
- Sean Paul
- Daya
- The Veronicas
- Dany Neville - Closing DJ Set

==== February 3, 2017 ====
- Demi Lovato
- Tove Lo
- Mike Posner
- Calum Zibala
- Dany Neville - Closing DJ Set

=== RedfestDXB 2018 ===
==== February 8, 2018 ====
- Anthony Touma
- Kelli-Leigh
- Russ
- The Chainsmokers

==== February 9, 2018 ====
- Bebe Rexha
- Craig David
- Kesha
- Marshmello

=== RedfestDXB 2019 ===
==== February 14, 2019 ====
- DJ Snake
- G-Eazy
- Jonas Blue
- Jess Glynne (Cancelled)

==== February 15, 2019 ====
- Camila Cabello
- Macklemore
- Jax Jones
