= The Boxtones =

Dubai-based rock band composed of Scottish and Canadian musicians

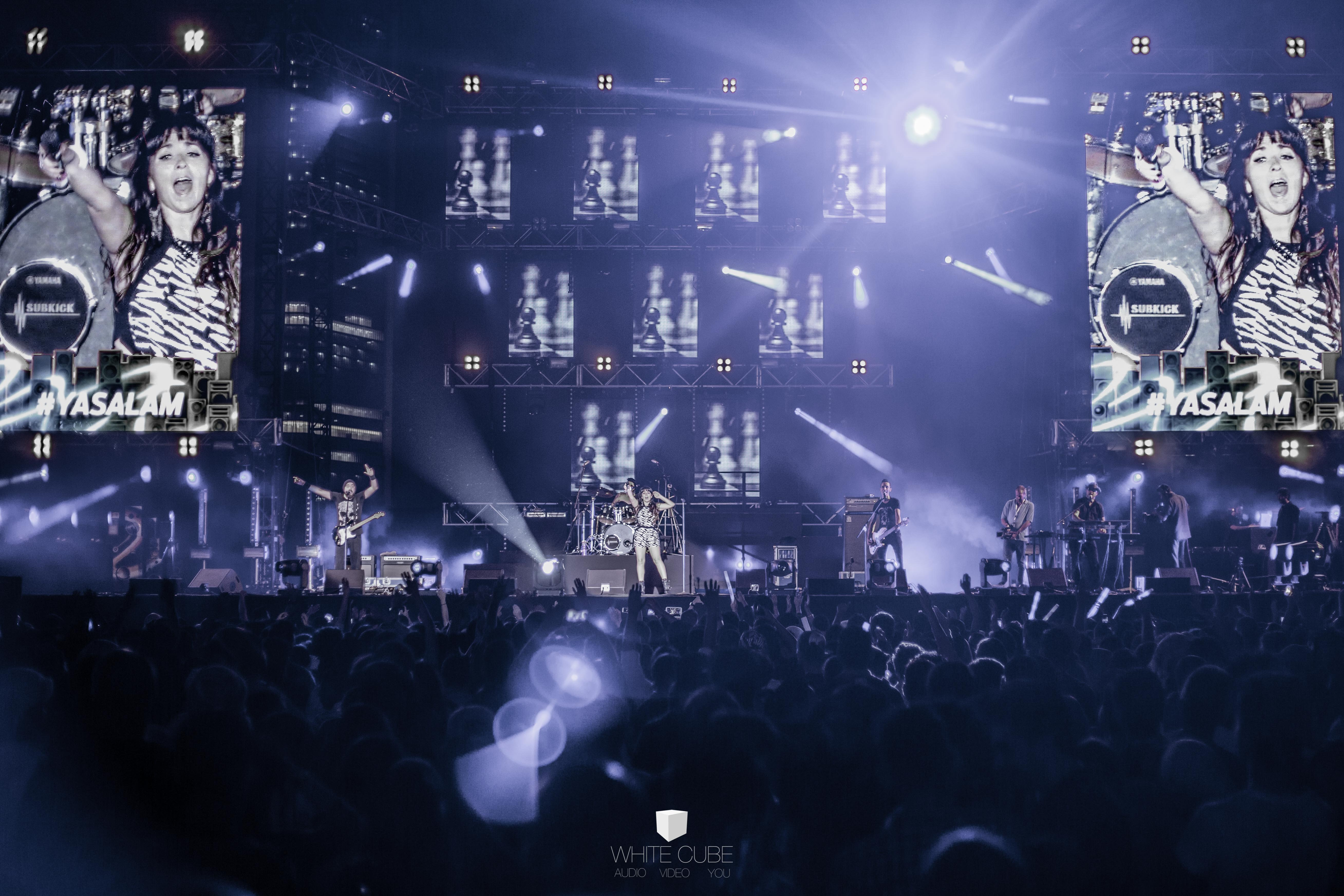
- The Boxtones during their performance at Yasalam Beats on the Beach, Abu Dhabi, UAE, 21 November 2014. From left to right: Gary Tierney, Gill Tierney, Louise Peel, Patrick Thibault and Will Janssen

Background information
- Origin: Dubai, UAE (Members are from Scotland and Canada)
- Genre: Rock
- Years active: 2013–present
- Labels: Universal Music Group Middle East & North Africa
- Members: Gary Tierney – Guitar & lead vocals; Gill Tierney – Drums & backing vocals; Louise Peel – Lead vocals; Will Janssen – Keys, guitar & backing vocals; Patrick Thibault – Bass & backing vocals
- Website: www.boxtonesband.com

The Boxtones is a Dubai-based rock band composed of Scottish and Canadian musicians.

In September 2013 the band won the Rolling Stone ‘Street to stage’ competition and in January 2014, released their first album, In the Pockets of Clowns from which the two singles 'After All is Said and Done" and 'UFO' were released. In April 2014 the band won the regional heat of Hard Rock Cafe's 'Hard Rock Rising' competition.

Throughout 2014 and 2015, the band played at a few high-profile concerts that saw them perform alongside numerous international superstars such as Pharrell Williams, The Who, Stereophonics, Lily Allen, Jason Derulo, The Parlotones, Richard Ashcroft, Razorlight, The Ting Tings and 80's music icons Europe.

On 25 February 2015, The Boxtones signed a record deal with Universal Music Group Middle East & North Africa (MENA).

The Boxtones’ debut album Home was released on 25 November 2016 through Universal Music MENA. So far, singles "Against the Odds", “City of Mirrors” (featuring Dubai-based rapper Two-Tone), “Home” and “Do I Look Like Somebody You Could Love” have been released, each with its own official music video.

In recent years, The Boxtones have performed alongside Liam Gallagher, Kaiser Chiefs, Blur, Florence & The Machine, Enrique Iglesias, Travis, Chemical Brothers, The Charlatans and The Temples. They were announced as the support for the Elton John concert that took place at the 13,500-capacity Dubai Autism Rocks Arena in January 2018, the same venue where they opened for Bryan Adams in March 2017.

The band is endorsed by Shure and Vic Firth.

== Awards and nominations ==
- Best Dubai act at the Time out Dubai Nightlife Awards (2017, Winners)
- Best local band / act at the Hype magazine award (2017, Winners)
- Best local band / act at the Hype magazine award (2015, Winners)
- Best Dubai act at the Time out Dubai Nightlife Awards (2015, Nominee)
- Shortlisted as one of Ahlan! Hot100 (2015)
- Best local act at the Ahlan! magazine award (2014, Nominee)
- Best local band / act at the Hype magazine award (2014, Nominee)

== Discography ==
=== Albums ===
- In the Pockets of Clowns (2014)
- Home (2016)

=== Singles ===
- After All Is Said and Done (2014)
- U.F.O. (2014)
- Against The Odds (2016)
- City of Mirrors (2016)
- Home (2016)
