= Empty Yard Experiment =

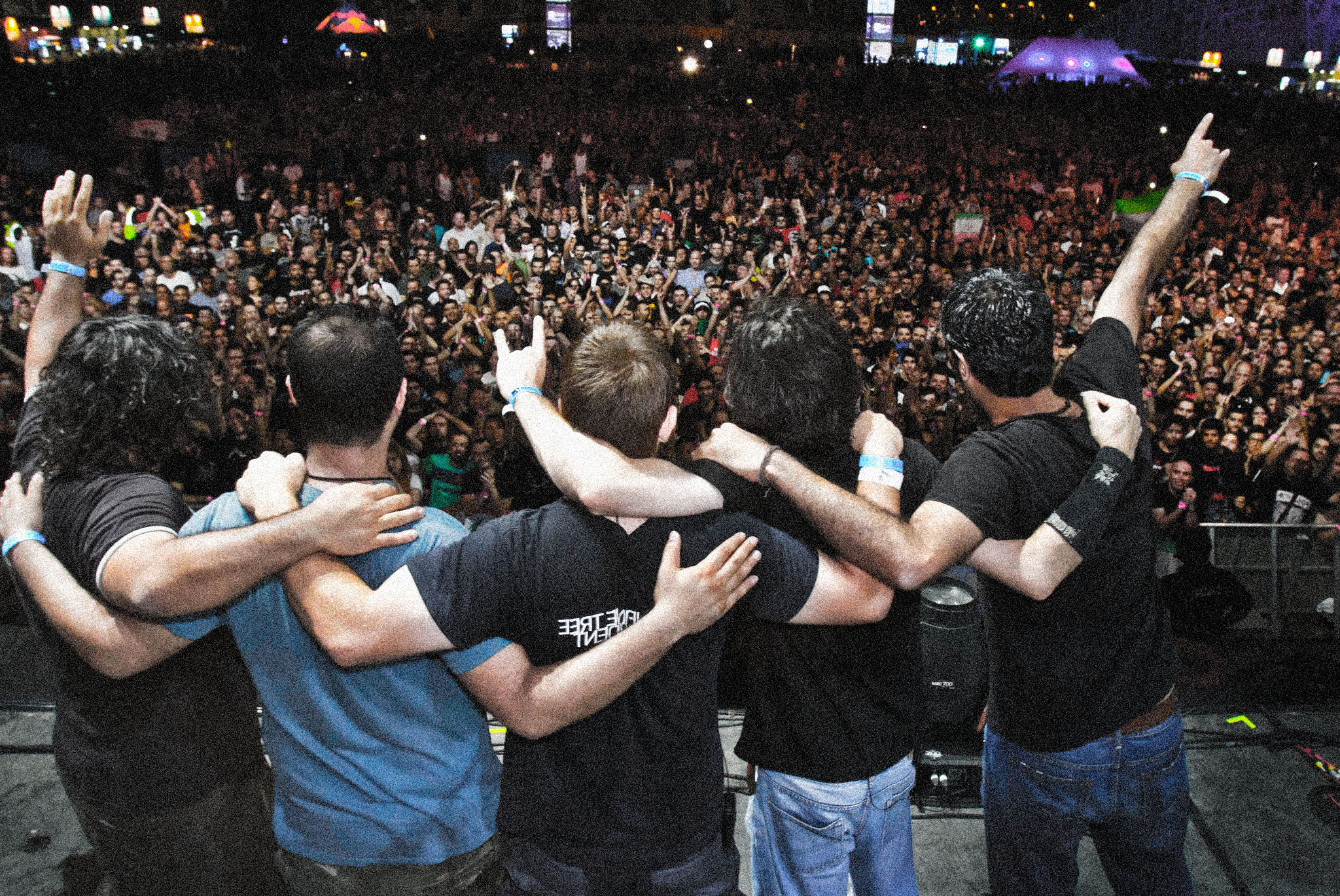
- Empty Yard Experiment, opening for Metallica at the Abu Dhabi Du Arena, Yas Island, United Arab Emirates (19 April 2013)

Background information
- Genres: Progressive rock, alternative rock, experimental rock, post-rock
- Years active: 2006–present
- Members: Bojan Preradovic; Mehdi Gorjestani
- Past members: Kaveh Kashani; Sami Al-Turki; Gorgin Asadi; Josh Saldanha; Manu Anand; Sasan Nasernia
- Website: www.emptyyardexperiment.com

Empty Yard Experiment (or EYE for short) is a progressive rock band. Founded in 2006, EYE has created a reputation for its live shows, where the band's music is complemented by the use of conceptual and visual art. The band's music often eludes categorization with its unique blend of Western musical traditions and those inspired by the various cultures of the Middle East. It incorporates various elements of post-rock and alternative rock to place the band as one of the most prominent progressive rock acts in the region. EYE's live shows relied heavily on visuals created by the band's drummers, Sami Al Turki and Altamash Urooj which allowed the band to offer their audience a "multi-sensory experience", used as a distinctive platform for communication with the audience.

EYE released a self-titled EP in 2011 and in 2014, the band released the critically acclaimed 'Kallisti', which was hailed by Metal Hammer magazine as a "sweeping, epic, multi-faceted piece that takes its listener on a journey that very few other bands are able to."

In 2013, EYE opened the show for Metallica at Abu Dhabi's Yas Island Du Arena., and has also opened for other iconic international acts such as Evanescence and Anathema.

== Discography ==
Studio albums

- Empty Yard Experiment EP (2011)
- Kallisti (2014)

Singles

- GHHR (2013)
- The Passage (2017)

== Band members ==
Current members

- Bojan Preradovic – Vocals, Rhythm Guitar (2010–present)
- Mehdi Gorjestani – Guitars (2006–present)

Session members

- Jay Postones – Drums (2018)
- Dale Gorham – Bass (2018)
- Munsef Turkmani – Bass (2017)
- Athena Ekhteraei – Guitars, Bass (2015–present)
- Manu Anand – Vocals, Guitars (2010–2015)
- Greg Cargopoulos – Drums (2013)

Former members

- Sami Al-Turki – Drums (2006–2010, 2016–2017)
- Kaveh Kashani – Bass (2006–2016)
- Gorgin Asadi – Keyboards, Synthesizers (2006–2016)
- Josh Saldanha – Drums (2013–2016)
- Sasan Sam Nasernia – Drums (2010–2012)
