= List of Whistle! characters =

This is a list of characters that appeared in the Whistle! anime and manga series.

== Sakura Josui Junior High Soccer Varsity ==
=== Boys' Team ===
Shō Kazamatsuri (風祭 将, Kazamatsuri Shō) (Voiced by Komukai Minako, Shun Horie during Whistle! voice remake)

Shō is the main character of the soccer manga and anime Whistle! He is a regular of the Josui High soccer varsity team and plays the position of Forward with Shigeki Satō. For a soccer player, Shō is pretty short at 146 cm (4 ft 9 in), which can be a hindrance, as well as an asset. His jersey number is 9. While not being very good at soccer, Sho has a thirst to improve and never gives up. His determination often inspires the people around him, and is something that even his team captain Mizuno admires. While he's neither the best nor the leader of his soccer team, he is the heart of it.
His character has a few quirks. He has an odd habit of slapping his cheeks with both hands to get himself motivated. He also has a very optimistic attitude and is very open-minded to the point that sarcasm and arrogant comments usually don't work on him; rather he takes them literally and usually agrees with the offender, which either annoys or humors them. He can get very angry sometimes and yell at the offender, but often turns embarrassed afterwards. As well, sometimes due to late night practices, Shō would fall asleep in class, causing Shigeki to jokingly say that Shō has already given up on school. Shigeki also calls him "Pup" or "Puppy" (pochi).
Miyuki Sakurai has a large crush on Shō, but he appears to have an interest in Yuki Kojima, friend and founder of the girls' soccer team – he thought she had long hair like a doll's when he first saw her. However, he may also like her because of her impressive soccer skills.
He later qualifies for the Junior Senbatsu Team (aka Tokyo Select), though only as a substitute player. Although many of the other Senbatsu players found him to be a less than average player, they soon realize his potential as a forward. He also becomes the one to bring the rest of the team together. After Tenjo leaves, Shō takes his place as the number 19 forward. He shows his real skills in a one-on-one battle with Tenjo, and in the game against the Seoul Senbatsu Team. During the game against the Kansai select, Shō suddenly fainted when it was down to stoppage time. It is revealed later that something has happened to his left knee and the doctor stated that there is a possibility of him not being able to play soccer anymore. But thanks to the encouragement from his teammates, family members and other people, he gains the courage to go to Germany to see a doctor that would help him heal his knee. At the end of the series it is shown that he returns from Germany and continues playing with his friends and teammates.
Unknownst to some of his soccer teammates, Shō is the son of Shiomi Kensuke, one of Japan's most famous soccer players, known for scoring goals from a non-existing zero angle (a technique that Shō used in his match against Hiba Junior High). After his parents died in a car accident, he was adopted by his uncle and aunt, Mamoru and Reiko Kazamatsuri, which is where he received his family name. Originally, he never realized who his real parents were until he started playing soccer. Along with the fact that his brother, Kō, does not look anything like him, a relative told him that he could not go against blood, which at first seemed ambiguous to him. He found out the truth after transferring schools; he realized that there are different names for his parents on his family certificate, though he kept it to himself since he considers himself lucky to have two mothers and two fathers.

Tatsuya Mizuno

Tatsuya Mizuno (水野 竜也, Mizuno Tatsuya) (Voiced by Maeda Takeshi, Shinnosuke Tachibana during Whistle! voice remake)

Tatsuya is a second year student and is also the best player and team captain of Josui Junior High. He became the captain after defeating the former captain (Honma) in a match alongside a bunch of substitutes as he didn't think Honma was serious enough about soccer. Not only is he a talented player, but also an honor student. Tatsuya tutors the novice Shō after being impressed with his determination and hard work. Shigeki calls him Tatsu-bon, which always annoys him. Due to his handsome looks, he has the most fan girls in his school, even gaining the admiration of the opposing schools' girls, though he does prefer to ignore them. Out of all his teammates at his school, Tatsuya is closest to Sho and Shigeki. His jersey number is 10.
Tatsuya lives with his mom, Mariko Mizuno and his aunts, Takako and Yuriko, in the Mizuno mansion. His parents are divorced. Tatsuya's father is the coach of the Musashinomori soccer team, Josui's rival school. Tatsuya doesn't get along well with his father, however, and has often expressed anger at Coach Kirihara's attempts to "control" him. Also, it is later revealed that, during his first year, Tatsuya passed Musashinomori's qualifying tests to enter into their school, but rejected the offer due to not wanting to be his father's puppet. Though many consider him to be a cool-headed person with an indifferent look on his face, Tatsuya actually gets very hot-headed when it comes to things involving his father, once even trying to punch Shigeki when the latter said he acted like his father.
During the Junior Senbatsu Training Camp, he realizes that he's been overprotecting Shō and also underestimating him. He soon discovers Shō's potential and finally has a deeper understanding of Shō's personality. He becomes the first person to qualify as a regular on the Junior Senbatsu team, as their ace midfielder. During the friendly match with the Seoul Senbatsu team in Korea, he begins to enjoy the game (originally, Tatsuya took soccer too seriously and did not realize that he simply enjoys playing soccer; according to his coaches, this trait was the only thing keeping him from becoming the "perfect" player), and now finally understanding how the others feel, he can finally connect with them.

Daichi Fuwa

Daichi Fuwa (不破 大地, Fuwa Daichi) (Voiced by Kiyasu Kohei, Takuya Eguchi during Whistle! voice remake)

Daichi 'The Crusher' Fuwa is known in Josui as a genius, but many find him dangerous and eccentric. He is called the Crusher because he crushes people's pride by outdoing them and saying what they have done wrong, not realizing that he's hurting/irritating others. His way of speaking is very blunt and direct. Though he's a genius at almost everything he does, the only things he doesn't understand are the basics of socializing and the meaning of just having fun. He meets Shō when the latter thought he was going to commit suicide by jumping into a river and tried to intervene. Shō introduces Fuwa into the world of soccer and Daichi decides to join the soccer team in order to investigate Shō's smile.
When he was at first introduced to the team, he didn't get along well with most others on the team. After a while, however, Shō, along with a little help from Musashinomori's goalkeeper, Katsuro Shibusawa, he manages to teach him the meaning of trust, and shows him how to get along better with others. He becomes the permanent goalkeeper, replacing Shigeki after Josui's first match of their tournament. Since he can easily calculate and predict the direction of the ball's trajectory, he is Josui's best goal keeper. Shō is the only person who understands him and is probably the only one who isn't afraid of him. His hobby is the activity of destruction and he dislikes things that cannot be explained scientifically. His jersey number is 1 and 12 in the Tokyo Senbatsu team.
He was accepted into the Junior Senbatsu Camp, but failed to get a regular spot on the Senbatsu team. He acted aloof about it, saying that he didn't care, but after Takai teased him about it, Fuwa snapped and yanked on Takai's cheeks comically. It was shown here that Fuwa still doesn't understand his own passion for soccer because he wondered why he felt angry. After Shibusawa was injured during practice and Kentaro injured during the match against Seoul Senbatsu, Fuwa became a substitute goalkeeper on the Senbatsu team.
According to a short make in which Shō visits Fuwa's family, it is revealed that Fuwa lives in a futuristic looking house with his grandfather (Fuwa Daisaku), his father (Fuwa Dairoku), his mother (Fuwa Otome), and his second cousin (Kyosuke Kurosu) who looks exactly like him. His mother is a developer of space food, and often serves her experiments for dinner (which Fuwa seems to like a good deal). His father is a drug researcher and has a tapeworm in his stomach which he uses to experiment on himself. His grandfather also appears to be an inventor. Fuwa calls his parents by their first name. He clearly inherits his intellectual mind from his whole family.

Shigeki Satō

Shigeki Satō (佐藤 成樹, Satō Shigeki) (Voiced by Kiuchi Hidenobu, Ryosuke Kanemoto during Whistle! voice remake)

Shigeki, or Shige, is a forward specializing in evasion and dodging techniques. He is said to be one of the best players in the school. He quit the soccer club during his first year because the upperclassmen didn't play seriously, so he got bored playing. But after Shō joined the club, he decided it was interesting again and decided to rejoin. Shige is never serious and usually jokes around a lot. He enjoys making-up nicknames for his friends. He often calls Shō pochi ('puppy' or 'pup'), and infuriates his captain by calling him "Tatsu-bon". He was initially the goalkeeper of Josui as there was no one else for the job, but was given the forward spot when Daichi came along. He has a thick Kansai-ben accent, and it is later revealed that he ran away from his home in Kyoto when he was young, making him a year older than most of his classmates. He now lives with monks at a shrine. His jersey number is 11.
Shigeki got an invitation to go to the Tokyo Senbatsu camp, but Coach Matsushita decided to reject the offer as he didn't feel that Shige was serious enough about soccer. Though he pretended not to care, Shige decided to become a serious soccer player and go for the pros after a talk with his old friend, Naoki. He also went back to visit his mother, back in his hometown. In the anime, since Shigeki finally became serious about soccer, Matsushita gave him a chance to play in the friendly match with the Seoul Senbatsu team. In the manga, which goes on for a bit further than the actual anime, Shigeki decides instead to begin playing soccer in his hometown, Kyoto. He changed his last name to Fujimura, and enrolled as a player from Kansai in the Toresen Tournament, in order to face off against Sho Kazamatsuri, his former teammate.
Kaoru Gomi (五味 薫, Gomi Kaoru)
One of the newcomers to the team after Tatsuya revamped it, he had thin nostrils that were easily mistaken for his eyes by most people, which appear to be vertical. A first year student and classmate of Hideomi and Yoshihiko. His jersey number is 8.
Hideomi Hanazawa (花沢 秀臣, Hanazawa Hideomi)
Tallest player in the soccer team and a first year student. Most of his teammates try to use his height as an advantage over the other medium-height players. He is a classmate of Kaoru and Yoshihiko. His soccer jersey is 2.
Hiroyoshi Noro (野呂 浩美, Noro Hiroyoshi)
A chubby player and first year student in the soccer team, he was originally a substitute who was threatened by Honma (listed below) to quit. Inspired by Shō's determination to be one of the best players in the club, he gladly joined the team. For a short time, he encountered psychological issues on whether he was playing a part in the soccer team or not before sensing that he was still important. His soccer jersey number is 4.
Masato Takai (高井 真人, Takai Masato)
One of the substitute players who teamed up with Tatsuya, Shō, Yoshihiko and Hideomi to take on the original varsity players after Tatsuya issued a challenge for a mini-game. He was a Forward for a short time when the initial team was propped up before he was reassigned as a Wingback because he had high stamina and his vision wasn't capable of handling the Forward position. He was replaced by Shigeki. His jersey number is 12.
Yoshihiko Koga (古賀 良彦, Koga Yoshihiko)
First year student with Hideomi. He is an academically-driven student who has a liking for soccer. His mother scorns him for prioritizing soccer over his studies. He is a classmate of Kaoru and Hideomi. His jersey number is 3.
Yusuke Morinaga (森長 祐介, Morinaga Yusuke)
One of the original soccer players and second year student, he quit with most of the players after they protested Tatsuya's revamping of the team. Coming to his senses, he agreed to be recruited back into the team. His soccer jersey number is 7.
Mamoru Tanaka (田中 衛, Tanaka Mamoru)
Second year student and classmate of Ippei Toyama, he joined his classmate in the soccer team when Tatsuya recruited him to join their ranks. His jersey number is 5.
Ippei Toyama (外山 一平, Toyama Ippei)
A second year student and classmate to fellow soccer player to Mamoru Tanaka, he was one of the new recruits to join the revamped soccer team. His jersey number is 6.
Santa Yamaguchi (山口 杉太, Yamaguchi Santa)
A recent recruit and first year student who was placed as a substitute player in the team, who joined in order to impress the girls in Josui High, especially Miyuki Sakurai. He often refers to himself as the "Super Sub", but when he was placed in the game, he realized he wasn't as good as he thought. He gets jealous of Shō, due to his lack of skill, and the fact that Miyuki has a crush on the short boy. However, he grew to accept Shō as a valuable comrade in the soccer team. He "proved" himself as a worthy member when he scored the second goal against Hiba High, though he did it when the ball Rokusuke Hata kicked accidentally bounced off the back of his head. His jersey number is 15.
Yasuaki Honma (本間 泰明, Honma Yasuaki)
Former captain of Sakura Josui's soccer team. When Shō came to the school, he requested a match with him after seeing Shō practice his lifting skills, though he was disappointed to see that Shō was lousy. After being challenged by Mizuno, he and a few others gang up on the substitute team (which included Shō, Mizuno, Takai, and Yoshihiko), since he wanted to target Mizuno. Later on in the series, after leaving the team, he spots Shō practicing and they both have a friendly mini 1-on-1 soccer game. Thus, during this game, Shō inspires him to start anew, but after he advances to high school.

=== Girls' Team ===
Yuki Kojima (小島 有希, Kojima Yuki)
Second year Yuki Kojima is the founder of the girls' team after being club manager for the boys' team and being tired of sitting on the sidelines. Many of the club members think Yuki is scary because of her bluntness and often unlady-like attitude. However, she often uses her good looks and girly charm to get the boys to do things for her. She is a very skilled player, and encourages Shō and Masato to never give up on soccer. She is also very serious about soccer, even to the point of cutting her hair short offscreen in order to play in a game with the boys. When the girls' team isn't going well, Shō turns that same positive encouragement around.
Yuki was originally part of a soccer team at her last school, until she moved away with her family. When she arrived at Josui however, she could not continue playing soccer because she was a girl. Therefore, she became a person who sat in the sidelines and 'beat up' people who she did not think were worthy enough of playing soccer. She became infamous for this and everyone wondered who the mysterious soccer player was. She reveals her identity when she berates Masato for trying to quit the team, and plays a match against him to prove his worthiness. After the match, Shō convinces her to become a player rather than simply managing the boys' team, and thus she creates a girls' soccer team.
Near the end of the manga, Yuki decided on playing soccer for a living. However, knowing that a female soccer player would not rise easily to fame in her country, she goes abroad to the US to fulfill her dream of becoming a great player.She is an amazing player on the team.
Miyuki Sakurai (桜井 みゆき, Sakurai Miyuki)
A girl with an immense crush on Shō. Since she is in the photography club, she often uses that excuse to take pictures of Shō when given the chance. And like Yūko, she also lends her support in any way she can to encourage Shō to do his best. She becomes the manager for the boys' soccer team when Yuki becomes too busy with the girls' soccer team. Miyuki also became part of Yuki's soccer team in the manga, though in the anime, the tryouts for Josui's girls' soccer team is not shown, and she is shown only as a supporter for the boys' team. She is admired by Santa Yamaguchi, who joined the team to be with her, while she in fact joined the team because of Shō. She would often get angry at Santa for always coming between her and Shō or when he bad-mouths Shō, despite the fact that Santa only does those things because he is jealous. Of course, she is not aware of Santa's feelings for her, and is constantly just trying to get Shō to notice her more. In the manga, she realizes that she loves seeing Shō play, rather than actually loving him.
Shizuyo Toda
Shizuyo joined the girls' soccer team to be around her friend, Miyuki. She doesn't appear in the anime (as the scene where Yuki picks the members isn't shown) but has a few short appearances in the manga. She seems to be able to play the game, having played it before with her little brother, and was able to pass the test Yuki set for the girls who wanted to be on Josui's girls' soccer team.
Nene Yokoyama
She's a third year. Nene's a tall girl, who seems to enjoy, and be fairly good at playing soccer, as she passed the test Yuki set for girls who wanted to join the team. She was hoping to join a high school soccer team, and took advantage of the chance to be in a junior high one. Like Shizuyo, she's not shown in the anime, and is only rarely seen in the manga.
Maiko Kamijo
Maiko originally joined the team because she considered Yuki to be her rival in looks. Yuki originally refused to let her join, on the account that she didn't know how to play soccer, but gets annoyed with Tatsuya's fangirls and decided to set a test for any girl who wanted to join the team. Maiko decided to try, and though she, along with Miyuki, doesn't manage to pass, they're both accepted by Yuki who was impressed by their persistence.

== Musashi no mori Junior High Soccer Varsity ==
Seiji Fujishiro (藤代 誠二, Fujishiro Seiji)
Musashinomori's famous ace Striker. A forward with incredible technique, and passed 5 of Josui's defense during their game. He has a very optimistic attitude and is never seen despondent. Whenever he sees a game that involves Josui's team playing, he would immediately want to be a part of the action as well. His jersey number is 9.
He becomes a regular on the Junior Senbatsu Team.
Katsuro Shibusawa (渋沢 克朗, Shibusawa Katsurō)
Musashinomori's famous Goalkeeper, known as the Guardian Deity of Musashinomori. He is a year older than most of the other Junior high characters except for Shige. He makes incredible saves, and, as some game viewers say, is inhuman at detecting shots and reading moves. He towers over many of the other characters at 183 centimeters tall. He's one of the few players in Mushashinomori who does not look down on Shō and/or Josui in general, and he once said that Musashinomori's game with Josui is one of the toughest games they had to play. As Musashi's captain, he is very respected and has excellent leadership skills. His jersey number is 1.
He becomes a regular on the Junior Senbatsu Team and is also chosen to become the captain by his teammates. However, he is hurt shortly before the Senbatsu team goes to Korea and gets replaced by another goalie.
Shigeru Mamiya (間宮 茂, Mamiya Shigeru)
This defense player is notorious for his skill at marking and restricting the movement of players. They often call him 'viper' because once he makes his mark, or his 'bite', he won't ever leave that player's side, sometimes even resorting to illegal moves to take the player down. Once, in Josui's game with Mushashinomori, he kicked Tatsuya purposefully when the latter was about to score a goal.
He becomes a regular on the Junior Senbatsu Team.
Akira Mikami (三上 亮, Mikami Akira)
This player is Musashinomori's midfielder. Since Mizuno would have gotten his position instead of Mikami had he joined Musashinomori, there is tension between the two of them when rumor gets out that Mizuno might be transferring. Akira tries to create a rift between Mizuno and his father, which results in Mizuno getting upset. Even though it is revealed later that Mizuno has no intention of transferring, Akira still considers him to be a rival and competes to defeat him. His jersey number is 10.
He fails to make the Junior Senbatsu Team.

== Hiba Junior High Soccer Varsity ==
Tsubasa Shiina (椎名 翼, Shiina Tsubasa)
A transfer student from Asashiro Junior High, who passed the entrance exams with high scores and is considered to have a high IQ. Due to his appearance, many people mistake him for a girl. Though, his looks could fool people in believing that he is a sweet and cute kid, in actuality, Tsubasa is very arrogant, blunt, sarcastic, and often fierce. He considers himself a genius and often says that soccer just comes naturally to him, that's why no-one can beat him. Because of his size and looks, he was often picked on as a child and became very proficient at martial arts to defend himself. Though he is only slightly taller than Shō, he doesn't let that get in his way and is actually a great fighter and a superb leader. Shiina thinks of Sho as his rival since they both has a disadvantage in their heights. His looks and attitude, unfortunately, also made him some enemies (and some really big fans). Among them were 3rd year, Naoki Inoue and Gosuke Hata, and two of their friends. Although, after saving them from a group of bully truck drivers, they soon realized that they were all alike and decided to follow Shiina. Later on, he was made the leader of the Hiba Soccer Varsity team. His uniform number is 4.
During the Senbatsu Training Camp, he becomes even closer friends with Shō and comes to truly understand him. He becomes a regular defender on the Junior Senbatsu Team. Hiba's coach, Akira, is actually his first cousin.
Naoki Inoue (井上 直樹, Inoue Naoki)
Due to his temper, he would tend to pick fights with people and generally cause trouble at Hiba. One of these people was Tsubasa Shiina, who challenged Inoue to try to get the ball past him in a soccer mini-game. Inoue lost. Later on in the series, he goes to spy on Shigeki at his new home. Due to some circumstances, Shigeki immediately doesn't recognize him even though they knew each other in Kyoto when they were children. Like Shige, he has a thick Kansai-ben accent so they are both easy to single-out. Shige calls him 'monkey' as a sort of endearing term even though he does eventually remember his name. Later on when Shige comes to a crossroads, Naoki helps his friend face life head-on. Coincindentally, him and Shige ended up dying their hair blond after they separated during childhood.
Masaki Kurokawa (黒川 柾輝, Kurokawa Masaki)
The other midfielder wing along with Naoki. A perceptive, generally quiet and calm young man. He has a defensive style of playing and becomes a regular on the Junior Senbatsu Select Team. He is particularly close to Tsubasa, providing a counterbalance to Tsubasa's more abrasive personality. Likes swimming and the outdoors, and dislikes vulgarity.
Rokusuke Hata (畑 六助, Hata Rokusuke)
Rokusuke plays defense and his uniform number is 2. He's the brother of Gosuke (五助), who is also a defender with uniform number 3. Their names as brothers are funny because 'Go' means 'five' and 'Roku' means 'six'. Along with Shiina, these three form Hiba Junior High's famous defense team using the 'Flat Three' strategy.
He becomes a regular on the Junior Senbatsu Team.
Gosuke Hata (畑 五助, Hata Gosuke)
Gosuke plays defense and his uniform number is 3. He's the brother of Rokusuke (六助), who is also a defender with a uniform number of 2. The initial part of their names can be interpreted into numbers, as 'Go' means 'five' and 'Roku' means 'six'. Along with Shiina, these three form Hiba Junior High's famous defense team using the 'Flat Three' strategy.

== Junior Senbatsu Team ==
Ryōichi Tenjō (天城 燎一, Tenjō Ryōichi)
Tenjō is a forward from Kokubu Junior High School. His style of soccer playing was very independent and cold hearted. His father was a major businessman who told him to take power with his own hands because he wasn't going to help his own son. Therefore, Tenjō believed that he could be the best through his own actions and didn't like teamwork. Even though he has great power, due to his lack of teamwork he failed the qualifying tests into entering Musashinomori's soccer club (the same time as when Tatsuya passed the tests, but declined), which made him angry and bitter. Fortunately, things seemed to be brighter for him when Shō confronts him after Josui defeated Kokubu in a difficult game. The only person who he ever cared for was his nanny, Kazue. Unfortunately, after her death, he was contemplating on quitting soccer because he believed that he played only to see her smile and now that she's gone, there's no point in playing any more. Things for him seemed to heat up even more when Hiba's leader, Tsubasa Shiina, trash talks him to leave after beating his school in a game (a game in which Tenjō was not able to play in with full power since he was mentally damaged due to Kazue's death just before the game). After playing mini-soccer with Shō and his friends, against Tsubasa and his friends, Tenjo realized that he loves soccer and that Kazue would want him to keep playing what he loves.
He becomes a regular on the Junior Senbatsu Team. Although, after realizing that his mom didn't abandon him, he called her and she went to visit him in Japan. He found out that he is half German, though he already figured that he wasn't all Japanese, and that he also has a little sister. His mom wanted him to live with them in Germany, so with the help of Shō, Tenjō soon came to grips with the fact that he wanted to go. He quit the Junior Senbatsu Team and went to Germany, though he did say that he wasn't going to give up on soccer, but will be playing in Germany.
Taki Sugihara (杉原 多紀, Sugihara Taki)
Taki is a midfielder from Takinawa Junior High chosen to qualify for the Junior Senbatsu Camp. He doesn't have much stamina, but he has excellent ball control. His pinpoint passes are made to draw-out the potential of the receiver. Taki becomes good friends with Shō since they were in the same team during camp. Though Kaku doesn't acknowledge him as his rival, Taki looks to Kaku as his rival, having been on a team with him years ago.

He becomes a regular in the Tokyo Senbatsu Team who wears the number 18.

Teppei Koiwa (小岩 鉄平, Koiwa Teppei)
Teppei is a second year forward and the only candidate from Edogawa Junior High School. His friends worked together to help pay his travel ticket. He was chosen to qualify for the Junior Senbatsu camp because of his incredible speed. At first he was considering quitting the camp because he saw himself as inferior compared to the rest, but was convinced to stay by the gardener of the camp.
He becomes a substitute player for the Junior Senbatsu team and his uniform number is 21.
Kazuma Sanada (真田 一馬, Sanada Kazuma)
A forward who is a member of the elite Under-14 trio along with midfielders Eishi and Yūto. He seems arrogant, but actually loses confidence in his ability pretty easily. This weak-mindedness directly affects his performance on the field and sometimes tends to bring down his team of U-14; when things don't go his way, he will throw a fit. He always blames others (including Shō and his team in the soccer retreat). Eventually as time goes by, he will start to overcome his selfish attitude and when he sees Shō playing during the Korean Tournament, will start to befriend Shō and his team.
Eishi Kaku (郭英士, Kaku Eishi)
Although he was born and raised in Japan, Kaku's mother is Korean (and most likely his father as well, as his last name is of Korean origin and not native Japanese). His Korean name is Kwak Yeoung-sa. The rival he looks to for recognition is his cousin, Lee Yun-gyong, a midfielder and number 10 on the Seoul Senbatsu team. He is part of the Under Fourteen (U-14) trio of elites along with Yūto and Kazuma. He attends Zoushigaya Junior High.
Yūto Wakana (若菜 結人, Wakana Yūto)
Part of the U-14 trio along with Eishi and Kazuma. At first, he is very conceited because of his place among the three elite, but is humbled as he realizes the others who are chosen to attend Tokyo Senbatsu have their own unique talents. He attends Setodaisen Junior High.
Takashi Narumi (鳴海 貴志, Narumi Takashi)
A very tall and talented soccer player from Meisei Junior High who plays aggressively, and later gets one of the forward spots. He has a big mouth and seems to be quite a womanizer. He claims to hate midgets, especially those like Shō, due to a previous incident where the girl he liked preferred a short guy instead. He eventually warms up to Shō when Shō proves his self-worth by playing a crucial role in helping the Junior Senbatsu team make a comeback.
Hitoyoshi Iga (伊賀 仁吉, Iga Hitoyoshi)

== Supporting characters ==
Kō Kazamatsuri (風祭 功, Kazamatsuri Kō)
Kō is Shō's older brother, but less mature cousin who occasionally offers advice to Shō. Some questions do arise about their differences in appearances. He was thought to be Shō's older brother until it was revealed Shō is adopted and Kō is the son of Shō's aunt and uncle, who adopted him after his parents died. Even though the two are not biological brothers, they still help each other whenever a situation arises. He may seem like a slob at home, but he dresses quite professionally when he goes out, often wearing suits when he goes to work. He works as the vice-president of a modeling agency, which earns him a significant amount of money. Since he dropped out of high school, his father is sometimes bitter about him making more money than his own father.
Yūko Katori (香取 夕子, Katori Yūko)
Yūko Katori is Shō and Shigeki's English teacher and was also the soccer club's coach before Matsushita. She is a bit of an airhead but is very concerned for her students. After seeing that Shō wanted to be one of the best soccer varsity players, she tries her best to support him and his comrades by assisting in their retreat, despite not knowing much about soccer. Kō once tried to make advances on her, which may or may have not worked. Shigeki calls her Ane-san (Big Sister). Despite her short temper, she is somewhat of a ditz and often relies on Tatsuya Mizuno to help her, which he does reluctantly. Tatsuya is also the only person who can restrain her or keep her calm.
Oya-san
Oya-san manages a small Oden stand under the Inochi River Bridge. He initially had a rocky interaction with Shō, but later becomes one of his biggest supporters and encourages him in his dream to be a good soccer player. He, in fact, comes to all their tournaments with a big banner and cheers them on with Kō.
Soujū Matsushita (松下 左右十, Matsushita Soujū)
A frequent at Oya-san's Oden stand, and former professional soccer player, Matsushita is intrigued by Sakura Josui after watching their match against Musashinomori. He quit soccer altogether after a chilling experience with his teammate Amamiya, but Sakura Josui's advisor, Katori, works hard to try and convince him to be the team's new coach. In the end, his old friend Amamia tells him to forget about the past and move on, stating that he still loves soccer even after that incident. Inspired by his friend, Matsushita becomes Sakura Josui's new coach. As their coach, he is very knowledgeable, due to his prior soccer experiences. He's able to figure out the opposing teams strategies and come up with his own, often confusing the other team. Though he teaches his team on the field, he prefers to let them come up with their own life solutions off the field, but sometimes gives them advice when he sees that they are stuck.
Reiko and Mamoru Kazamatsuri (風祭 礼子, 風祭 衛, Kazamatsuri Reiko, Kazamatsuri Mamoru)
Shō's new parents since the tragic accident of his former parents (Kaori Shiomi and Kensuke Shiomi (潮見 謙介, Shiomi Kensuke)). They both took him as their own son when he was two years old. Mamoru is the brother of Shō's real mother. He originally did not approve of Kensuke since he believed that soccer was not a real job. Though, after talking to Kensuke, he soon had a positive outlook on the man and approved of him. Mamoru was against Shō playing soccer, but soon realized that Shō was just like his brother-in-law and approved of him going to Musashinomori.

== Manga specific characters/teams ==
Toshiki Sugama (俊樹須釜 Sugama Toshiki)

Suga is a volente with Kanto Select. He is an old friend of Kazamatsuri who played futsal with him during volume 14, who plays against him in the first round of the toresen. His appearance is Vol 16., and re-appears in volume 19-20.
Kazu Kunugi (功刀 一, Kunugi Kazu)
Kazu is a goal keeper with the Kyushu district. He claims that he is the number one goal keeper of the generation, ahead of Shibusawa. His appearance is volume 19-20.
Shōei Takayama (高山 昭栄, Takayama Shōei)
Takayama is an eighth grader with the Kyushu district. He befriends Kazamatsuri when he saves his contacts from being squished. He tells Shō he is the defender who will stop Batis, Raul, and Ronaldo someday. He said he will use all his might to beat Shō. His appearance is Vol. 19
Maekawa
He appears twice during the training camp that Shō and his friends were at. Also in volume 15, he teaches Shō a new trick that he can use in future games.
Masahiro Suō (周防 将大, Suō Masahiro) – J1 formerly J2 Pantera Fuchu (Vol.16)
During volume 16, Shō, Shige, and Yuki head to a Futsal soccer court where they meet Fuchu's Masahiro Suō. Suō recruits Shō and Shige to play a match with other high school kids. Eventually, Shō's team wins, which prompts the other kids to also want to play. It turns out that Suō is a famous professional soccer player. He is known as Pantera Fuchu, and is part of J2 (bottom division of the Japan League) but moves into J1 as a result of getting in a promotion spot. Later, Shō and Kō watch him on TV playing in a soccer tournament.

He appears in the epilogue giving Shō a recommendation on a good doctor that can fix broken legs.

Akito Kojima (小島 明人, Kojima Akito)
Yuki's older brother; he appears in the manga twice. Once in an earlier volume when Yuki gets scolded by her mother and storms upstairs to her room, where she's surprised to see him home for time off until his next game starts. He appeared another time in volume 17, where he accompanies Kō and the rest of Josui's soccer team to see Shō and Mizuno off to their big game in Seoul, Korea for the Korean Selection game.
