= Abu Dhabi Festival =

Annual arts festival in United Arab Emirates

Abu Dhabi Festival is an annual cultural festival in Abu Dhabi, United Arab Emirates; it was established in 2004. The festival is presented by the Abu Dhabi Music & Arts Foundation. The event has been held under the patronage of Sheikh Mohamed bin Zayed, President of the United Arab Emirates, Ruler of Abu Dhabi and Commander-of-Chief of the United Arab Emirates Armed Forces. It was originally under the patronage of Sheikh Abdullah bin Zayed Al Nahyan, then Minister of Information and Culture. Abu Dhabi Festival is the largest classical arts event in the UAE.

== Commissions ==
Abu Dhabi Festival regularly commissions new works, often in partnership with other international festivals.

== Education ==
Abu Dhabi Festival has an educational programme which brings together participating artists, school, college and university students from across the UAE.

== Awards ==
The Abu Dhabi Festival Award is presented each year to participating national university students in the fields of performing and visual arts, music, film, literature and communication.
