= Tila Tequila discography =

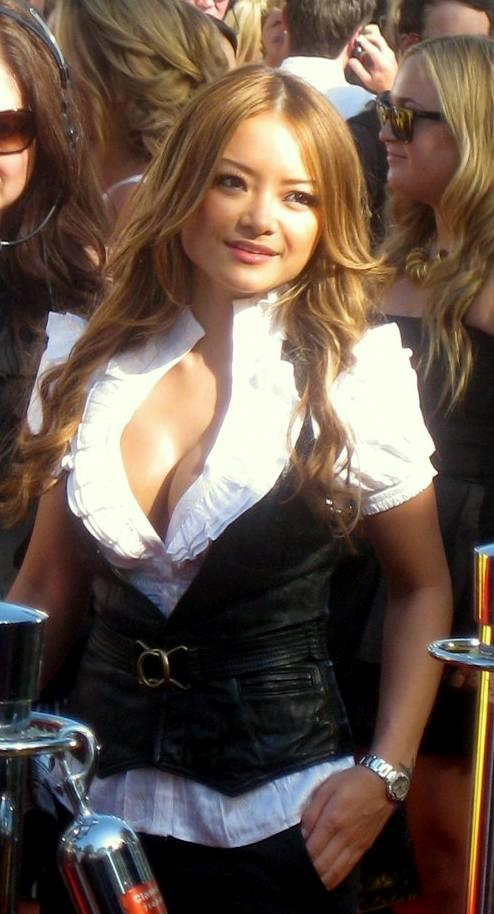
- Tequila at the 2008 MTV Video Music Awards
- EPs: 2
- Singles: 5
- Music videos: 5

American recording artist Tila Tequila has released two extended plays, five singles, and five music videos. After being allegedly offered recording contracts from Jive, Interscope and will.i.am Music Group, she decided to stay independent and kept releasing music under her own labels StratArt and later, Little Miss Trendsetter.

Originally being the lead singer of bands Beyond Betty Jean and Jealousy, Tequila embarked on a solo career in 2007. Her debut single, "I Love U", received mixed reviews from music critics and failed to enter the Billboard Hot 100. However, it sold over 13,000 copies in its first week. Shortly after the release of her first single, Washington-based record label The Saturday Team released Tequila's debut EP, Sex (2007), which according to her was not authorized for release and was removed from most retailers. The record label sued Tequila over breaching her contract related to the album and subsequently made Sex available for digital purchase. Her second single, "Stripper Friends", failed both critically and commercially, selling less than 1,000 copies in its first week.

By 2010, Tequila decided to reinvent her image and changed her stage name to Miss Tila. Her first single released under the new moniker was "I Love My DJ", along with an explicit version of the song "I Fucked the DJ". Released under her newly established label Little Miss Trendsetter, the single received negative reviews and failed to be successful in charts. She followed with the release of her second EP, Welcome to the Darkside (2010), which marked a musical departure from her previous material, being influenced mainly by classical music and blues.

== Extended plays ==
Title	Details
Sex	Released: March 20, 2007; Label: The Saturday Team; Format: CD, digital download
Welcome to the Darkside	Released: May 11, 2010; Label: Little Miss Trendsetter; Format: Digital download

== Singles ==
=== As lead artist ===
Title	Year	Album
"I Love U"	2007	Non-album single
"Stripper Friends"	2007	Non-album single
"Paralyze"	2008	Non-album single
"I Love My DJ"	2010	Non-album single
"You Can Dance"	2011	Non-album single

=== As featured artist ===
Title	Year	Album
"Drunk Dialing" (Yak Boy Fresh featuring Tila Tequila)	2015	Non-album single

== Guest appearances ==
Title	Year	Other artist(s)	Album
"Straight Up"	2005	None	MySpace Records Volume 1
"Ballin' Round the Clock"	2008	Dren feat. Glueazy & Ricky Ruckus	A Shot At Life

== Videography ==
=== Music videos ===
title	Year	Director(s)
"Electronic Bon Bon"	2006	Mike "Michelangelo" Cash
"I Love U"	2007	—
"Stripper Friends"	2008	Markus Johnson
"Paralyze"	2008	—
"Walking on Thin Ice"	2011	LaMarck
