= Charles M. Robinson (video director) =

American music video director (born 1984)

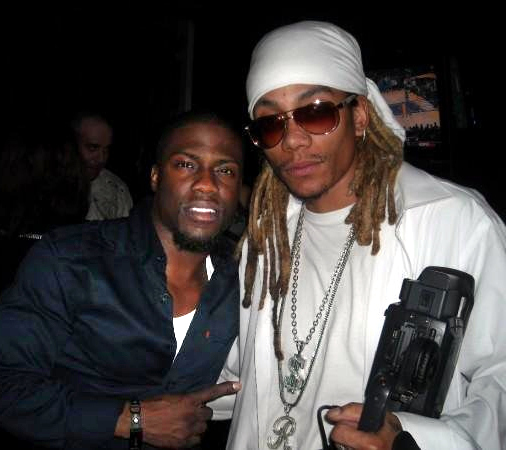
- Robinson with Kevin Hart
- Born: Washington, D.C./ Hyattsville MD
- Other name: Charlie Brown
- Education: Middle Tennessee State University
- Occupation: Director/musician/videographer
- Years active: 2005–present
- Website: http://northernlightshd.blogspot.com

Charles Mariano Robinson (born February 2, 1984) is a music video and commercial director, and musician. Robinson is known for shooting videos for artists such as Waka Flocka, Young Buck, and Shawty Lo.

== Early life ==
Robinson attended Greenbelt Middle School in Greenbelt, Maryland and attended Fairmont Heights High School (Maryland) in Capitol Heights, Maryland.

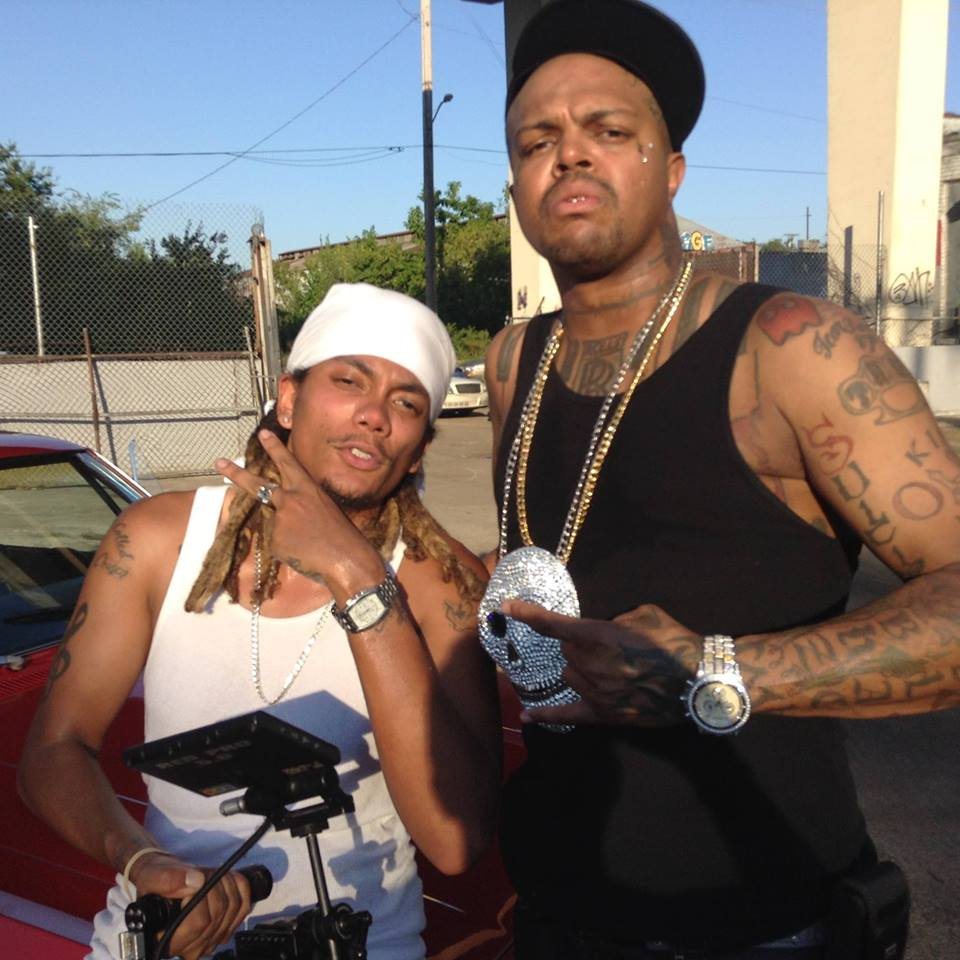
Charles M Robinson with Dj Paul

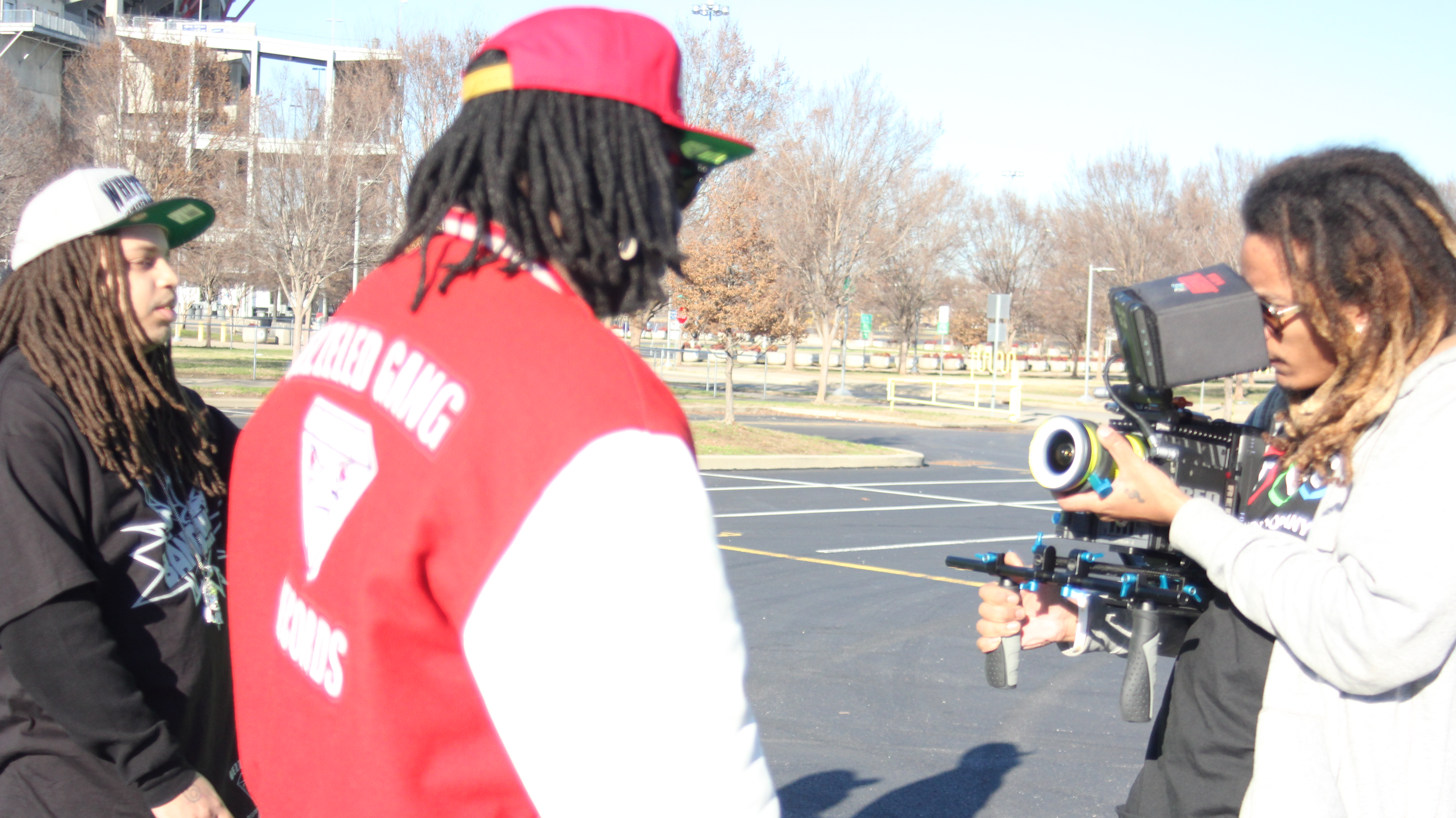
Charles M Robinson with RedCam Scarlet – Nashville TN Indoor

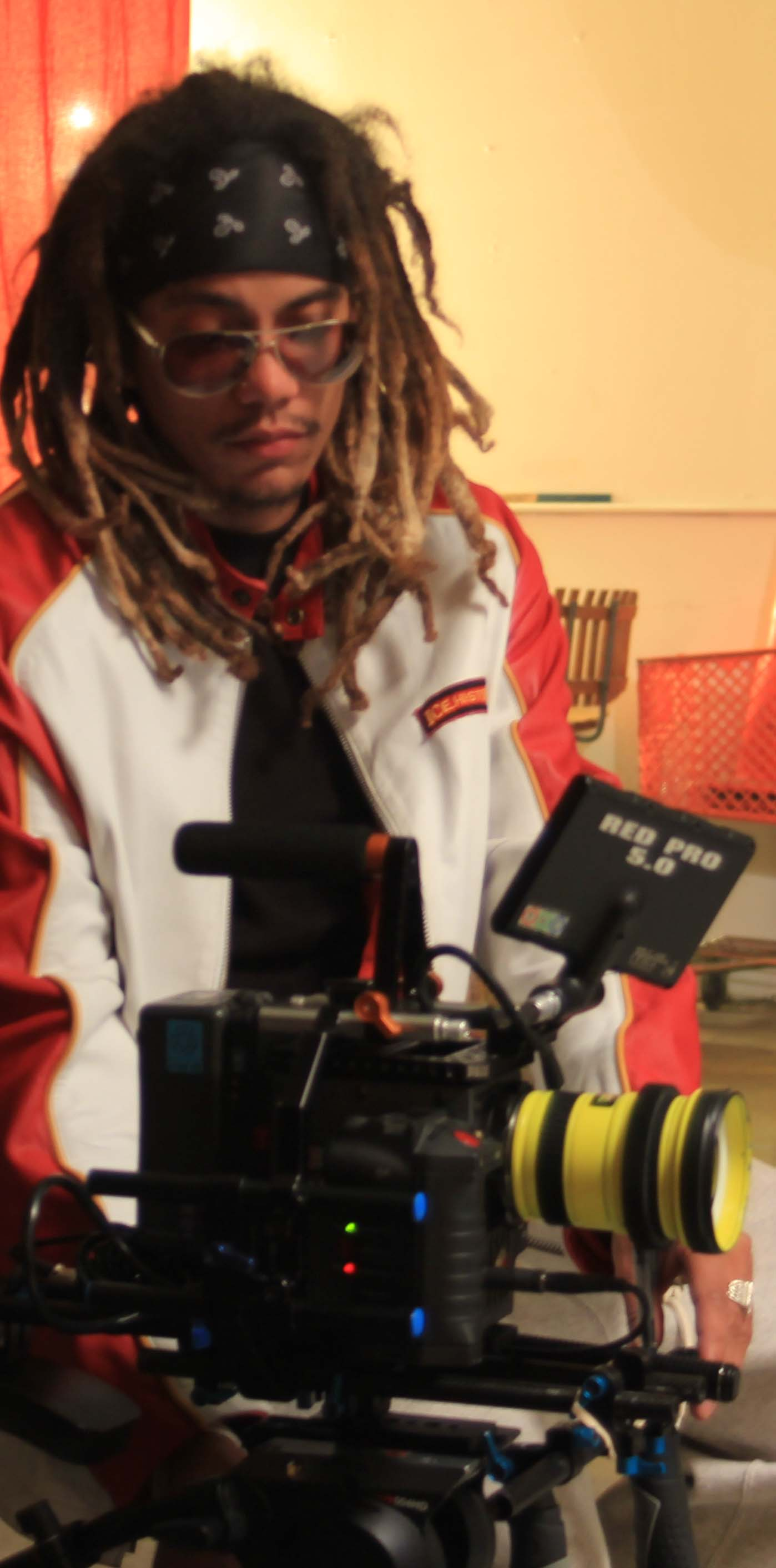
Charles M Robinson with RedCam Scarlet – Nashville TN Indoor

== Films ==
- MoneyMakers (2010) – Co-Director, Director of Photography, editor
- Masterminds (2013) – Cameraman
- Too Much Sugar for a Dime, The Milwaukee Story, (2020) Writer, Co-Director and Co-Producer. Executive Producer Paystack, Co-Producer Britney Winters, In Collaboration with Many Others, Avenue Q Designs, et al. {See Trailer}

== Videography ==
=== 2018 ===
- Rich Homie Quan feat. Yung Mieo - Too Many

=== 2017 ===
- Meezy feat MJG - Gangsta Walkin
- L Roy Da Boy feat Starlito - Thinkin
- Paystack feat MJG - Sky Is The Limit
- Paystack feat Lil Boosie - Backstabbers
- Yung Mieo - Too Young For Love
- Stepp Stewart - Miracle (Stage Play/Music Video Musical)
- Starlito - Good Cop Bad Cop
- Starlito - Yeah 5X

=== 2016 ===
- Miss Morgan Myles - Wont Go Home
- Tommy Gunn - Blood on the Money (Extended Music Video/Movie)
- Ralo - Did It All
- YFN Lucci - Sick and Tired
- Silentó feat. Yung Mieo - Girlfriend
- Starlito - Theories
- Starlito feat. Dee-1 - Bad Combination
- Jason Little - Heartbreak
- Quan Mazzi - U Aint Right
- Kid Charis - My God Over Everything
- The Daily Howl - Be My Beyonce
- Tippa Gutta feat. Velisosa - Tha Streets

=== 2015 ===
- Starlito feat. Yo Gotti and Don Trip - No RearView II
- Starlito feat. Troy Money - Another 1
- Bezzeled Gang feat. RIO - Pu$$Y on Fleek
- Young Buck feat EazyBlvd - Neva Had A Job
- Troy Money feat. Starlito - 2k15
- Starlito feat. Lil E - Coming From Where Im From
- Big V, Nappy Roots feat. EazyBlvd - I Aint Gotta Tell Ya
- Starlito feat. Wilx - Mo Betta
- CookUpBos - Active

=== 2014 ===
- Rich Homie Quan feat. Columbia BT - She Crazy - prod by Zillasuper
- Starlito feat. Don Trip - No RearView
- Starlito - Insomnia Addict
- Shawty Lo - Federal Nightmares
- Young Dolph - Double Up
- Kevin Gates, Starlito and Don Trip – Leash on Life
- B.o.B - StadiumATL
- Starlito - Eyes Closed

=== 2013 ===
- DJ Paul feat. Yelawolf – Go Hard
- Shawty Lo – This Aint New To Me
- Young Breed of Triple C's feat. Bezzeled Gang – Day Off
- Starlito and Don Trip – Leash on Life
- Starlito and Don Trip – 28th Song
- Starlito and Don Trip – Shut Up
- Starlito and Don Trip – Paper Rock Scissors
- Maal The Pimp – Crying Out Tears
- Lyric October – Clap For Em
- Tqu The Hurricane – Im Mad
- Gemini Twinz – Amore Momma
- Julz – S.T.U.P.I.D.
- Julz – Rikers Island
- oFishal – Coolin Coolin
- Lroy Da Boy – Paradise
- The Gemini Twinz – CKE
- Bezzeled Gang – Vigorously
- Suga Shane – Look at Me Now
- Suga Shane – Head

=== 2012 ===
- Lil Flip feat. Marcos Stony – Hot Summer Day
- Mike Jones (rapper) feat. Marcos Stony – My Chain
- Kia Shine feat. Dirty Fresh – Fly Away
- Starlito and Ofishal – 8Up
- Bezzeled Gang – Die Young
- Young Buck feat. Bezzeled Gang – Dusted
- Ofishal and Starlito – Turning Back
- Bezzeled Gang feat. Starlito – Countin Money
- oFishal feat. MopTop – Dukes of Hazzard
- oFishal – iDrank
- Julz – Wine N Dine
- Star Murphy – Anywhere
- Troy Money and Starlito – Cheap Phones
- Lroy Da Boy – These Rappers
- Lroy Da Boy feat. A.B. – I Got a Reputation

=== 2011 ===
- Chingo Bling feat I.V. – Mexicanos Everywhere
- Star Murphy – U Send Me Swingin
- B Heezy – That's Wussup
- Bezzeled Gang – Loud
- Bezzeled Gang – Bang
- Maal The Pimp – New Chatt City
- BlackCatFish – Wonderful
- Bezzeled Gang – We Got It
- Likwid Flowz – Suck My Swagg

=== 2010 ===
- Young Buck feat. Young Paper – Tha City Paper Remix
- Bezzeled Gang feat. Project Pat – Gettin Money
- Robert Porter Da Hero – Hold My Spot
- Maal The Pimp – Do You Wanna Ride
- Tremo – Did It Again
- Project Pat feat. Marcos Stony – Gettin Money
- Marc Wayne – Southern Smoke
- Gemini Twinz – Love Or Hate

=== 2009 ===
- Young Paper – Tha City Paper
- Starlito – 23-Zone
- Axtion – RubberBand Money

=== 2008 ===
- Maal The Pimp – Chattanooga

=== 2007 ===
- Lady Dolla – 4 My Click
- Ace Luv Fam – Grippin Wood Grain
- Gabe Sizemore – Momma Dedication

=== 2006 ===
- Bezzeled Gang – Get Cha Money
- Eternal 3:16 – Cinderella

== Short films ==
- Starlito – Reasonable Emotions (2013)
- The Bartender (2011)
- Fatima...All Alone (2010) (Directed by David Keary)
- Victim of Society (2010) (Directed by David Keary)

== Music ==
"Full-Circle" Movie World Showing [Soundtrack](Album Music Only) (2007)
