= A Shot at Love II with Tila Tequila =

American television series

- Created by: Riley McCormick
- Developed by: SallyAnn Salsano
- Directed by: Scott Jeffress
- Presented by: Tila Tequila
- Opening theme: "Stripper Friends"
- Ending theme: "Stripper Friends"
- Country of origin: United States
- Original language: English
- No. of seasons: 1
- No. of episodes: 12

Production
- Executive producer: Sally Ann Salsano
- Producers: Michael Carrol; Damon Epps; Bradley Kell; Mary Morelli; Brian Spoor; Krista van Nieuwburg
- Cinematography: Paula Abarca
- Editor: Jarod Howell
- Running time: 60 minutes
- Production companies: 495 Productions; MTV Series Entertainment

Original release
- Network: MTV
- Release: April 22 – July 8, 2008

Related
- A Shot at Love with Tila Tequila (2007); A Double Shot at Love (2008)

A Shot at Love II with Tila Tequila is an American reality television dating game show. It is the follow-up season to A Shot at Love with Tila Tequila. The series is a bisexual-themed dating competition where 15 hetero males and 15 lesbian females live in a house with Tila Tequila and compete for her attention and affection. The contestants, unlike in season 1, are aware of Tequila's bisexuality. The winner of this season was contestant Kristy Morgan, who declined her "shot at love", stating she was not ready for a relationship with a woman.

A spin-off of the series entitled A Double Shot at Love featuring the bisexual "ikki twins" premiered on December 9, 2008. Tequila had previously confirmed on her official website that she would not be a part of the show's third season, but will instead be featured in a show focusing on her daily life.

== Episodes ==
#	Title	First aired
1	Another Shot of Tequila	April 22, 2008
2	A Full House	April 29, 2008
3	Hard to Swallow	May 6, 2008
4	A Fistful of Love	May 13, 2008
5	Casualties of Love	May 20, 2008
6	Tastes Like Candy	May 27, 2008
7	On Pins and Needles	June 3, 2008
8	Keep It In The Family	June 10, 2008
9	Three-Way Getaway	June 17, 2008
Special	A Shot at Love II: Happy Hour	June 24, 2008
10	Fire and Ice	July 1, 2008
Special	A Shot at Love II: One Shot Too Many	July 8, 2008

== Contestants ==
The following table lists the roster of contestants for each episode, ordered based on Tequila's call-out order.

#	Contestants	Episodes									
#	Contestants	1	2	3	4	5	6	7	8	9	10
1	Bo	Brittany	Sirbrina	Lisa	Bo	Lisa	Lisa	Jay	Kristy	Bo	Kristy
2	Brittany	Fame	V	George	Chad	Bo	Jay	Kristy	Bo	Kristy	Bo
3	Chad	Kristy	Ryan	Michelle	Brittany	Kristy	Bo	Bo	Brittany	Brittany	
4	Chris	Lauryn	Brittany	Scotty	Kristy	George	Kristy	Brittany	Jay		
5	Christian	Lisa	Kristy	Sirbrina	Scotty	Glitter	Brittany	Lisa			
6	Dominic	Michelle	Scotty	Brittany	Michelle	Scotty	George	George			
7	Fame	Glitter	Glitter	Chad	Sirbrina	Brittany	Scotty				
8	George	Sirbrina	Jay	Jay	Jay	Jay	Glitter				
9	Greg	V	Chad	Kyle	Glitter	Michelle					
10	Janny	Bo	Bo	Kristy	Lisa	Sirbrina					
11	Jay	Chad	Lauryn	Bo	George	Chad					
12	Jeremy	Christian	Dominic	Glitter	Kyle						
13	Kristy	Dominic	Michelle	Lauryn							
14	Kyle	George	George	V							
15	Lauryn	Jay	Lisa	Dominic							
16	Lili	Kyle	Kyle	Ryan							
17	Lisa	Ryan	Christian								
18	Mason	Scotty	Fame								
19	Matt	Greg									
20	Michelle	Mason									
21	Nick	Chris									
22	Rada	Jeremy									
23	Ryan	Matt									
24	Samantha^{1}	Nick									
25	Scotty	Rada									
26	Serenity	Tashi									
27	Sirbrina	Janny									
28	Tarra	Tarra									
29	Tashi	Lili									
30	V	Serenity									

- Contestants surviving elimination in the first episode are arranged alphabetically, while eliminated contestants are arranged based on the order Tequila announced that their shot at love had ended, with the first eliminated listed at the bottom. Surviving women are listed before the men as they were invited to stay in the house first.

^{1} Samantha eventually started being called by her nickname, "Glitter."

The contestant was eliminated.
The contestant won a date with Tequila.
The contestant won a date with Tequila, but was eliminated.
The contestant was removed from the competition due to violence.
The contestant was previously eliminated but was brought back into the competition.
The contestant was given a key before the elimination ceremony.
The contestant was offered the final key at the final elimination, but ultimately refused it.

=== Eliminations ===
The following table explains Tequila's published reasons for eliminating contestants.

- Some reasons were not stated in the episode in which they aired.

Women
Name	Reason for elimination	Episode eliminated
Serenity	Disrespected her by making out with Lili in her house.	Episode 1
Lili	Disrespected her by making out with Serenity in her house.	Episode 1
Tarra	Did not stand out.	Episode 1
Janny	Did not feel a connection.	Episode 1
Tashi	Creeped her out by "doing too much research on the Internet" on her.	Episode 1
Rada	Thought she was cool, but did not feel a connection.	Episode 1
Fame	Did not appreciate Fame interrupting her one-on-one time with another contestant by singing, and Tequila questioned her motives for being there.	Episode 2
V	Thought that she was more open to other people than her.	Episode 3
Lauryn	Felt that she wanted a friendship instead of a romance, as well as it seemed she wanted the attention of everyone else instead of her.	Episode 3
Sirbrina	Felt that Sirbrina offered nothing more than her attractive appearance. However, specific reason for elimination was not stated in episode.	Episode 5
Michelle	Felt that they lost their connection, and that she was fading into the background. However, specific reason for elimination was not stated in episode.	Episode 5
Glitter (Samantha)	Became fearful that she was too emotional for her.	Episode 6
Lisa	Did not like how she would not put her guard down. Also, Tequila was concerned about getting her heart broken, and how she did not want to deal with Lisa's constant head games.	Episode 7
Brittany	Did not think they had a romantic chemistry, despite admitting during a date that "she was falling in love with Brittany".	Episode 9
Kristy	Thought to be the "whole package," but ultimately declined to accept the key, saying that she was not ready to be in a relationship with Tequila.	Episode 10
Men
Name	Reason for elimination	Episode eliminated
Nick	Saw enough of him to last a lifetime, referring to the "gift in a box" during the talent show.	Episode 1
Matt	Sweet, but did not feel a connection at all.	Episode 1
Jeremy	Was acting a bit funny during Eliminations.	Episode 1
Chris	Uncomfortable by his bending her over and "trying to dry hump" her during the talent show.	Episode 1
Mason	Too much of a nice guy to handle a girl like her.	Episode 1
Greg	Had a stronger connection with twin brother (Dominic). Bothered by having brothers competing.	Episode 1
Christian	Was always drunk.	Episode 2
Ryan	Felt he no longer wished to be there.	Episode 3
Dominic	Believes that bisexuality and lesbianism are just phases to be outgrown.	Episode 3
Kyle	Though his early behavior endeared him to Tequila, Kyle's behavior turned out to be too creepy and stalkerish for her taste.	Episode 4
George	Was afraid he was too nice, and thought keeping him would only be for his protection. Brought back in Episode 5 after Tila had regrets of giving Chad a key instead of him.	Episode 4
Chad	Was disqualified for headbutting and punching Bo in the jaw and placing him in the hospital.	Episode 5
Scotty	Did not think they would cross that friendship line.	Episode 6
George	When Tequila brought him back after Chad was disqualified, she felt that George was happy to be back with everyone rather than having another chance with her.	Episode 7
Jay	Did not believe he was her type and did not want his temper to get in the way of their relationship.	Episode 8
Bo	She thinks that he is a great guy and believes that he will make someone happy one day, just not her. She wanted to be with Kristy.	Episode 10

==== Final elimination leaked ====
Before the final episode aired, an MSNBC report inadvertently leaked that Tequila would not actually find love. In the MSNBC report, which was published 18 days before the final elimination, it stated "[Tequila] won't fall in love with a man or a woman" followed by Tequila saying, "I am going to Africa. I think maybe I will fall in love in Africa."
