= List of international television series premieres on Australian television in 2011 =

This is a list of international television programs which first aired on Australian television in 2011. The list is arranged chronological order. Where more than one program premiered on the same date, those programs are listed alphabetically.

== Premieres ==
=== Free-to-air television ===
Program	Network	Debut date	Reference/s
(United Kingdom) Freefonix	ABC3	2 January	
(United Kingdom) / (Republic of Ireland) The Octonauts	ABC2	2 January	
(United Kingdom) Facejacker	SBS One	10 January	
(United States) The Late Late Show with Craig Ferguson	Eleven	11 January	
(India) / (Germany) / (France) The Jungle Book	ABC3	14 January	
New Zealand's Next Top Model	Eleven	16 January	
(United States) Bob's Burgers	Eleven	26 January	
(United States) Hawaii Five-0	Network Ten	30 January	
(United States) $#*! My Dad Says	Nine Network	31 January	
(United States) Blue Bloods	Network Ten	2 February	
(United States) America: The Story of the U.S.	SBS One	6 February	
(United States) Mike and Molly	Nine Network	9 February	
(United Kingdom) Florrie's Dragons	ABC2	9 February	
(United States) Scooby-Doo! Mystery Incorporated	Nine Network	12 February	
(United States) Generator Rex	GO!	13 February	
(United States) Ugly Americans	SBS One	14 February	
(United Kingdom) / (United States) / (Taiwan) Hero: 108	Network Ten	14 February	
(Korea) Dibo the Gift Dragon	ABC2	16 February	
(United Kingdom) Wonders of the Solar System	SBS One	1 March	
(United States) Harry's Law	Nine Network	6 March	
(United Kingdom) Mr Moon	ABC2	7 March	
(United States) The Avengers: Earth's Mightiest Heroes	ABC3	8 March	
(United States) The City	GO!	13 March	
(United Kingdom) Small Potatoes (2011)	ABC2	14 March	
(United Kingdom) Gordon's Great Escape	GEM	21 March	
(Japan) Vampire Knight	ABC3	28 March	
(United States) The Problem Solverz	Network Ten	4 April	
(United Kingdom) The Hive	ABC2	11 April	
(United States) Detroit 1-8-7	Seven Network	14 April	
(Japan) Deltora Quest	ABC3	30 April	
(United States) My Big Friggin' Wedding	Seven Network	2 May	
(United States) No Ordinary Family	Seven Network	2 May	
(United Kingdom) Madagascar	Nine Network	4 May	
(United States) Spartacus: Gods of the Arena	GO!	11 May	
(Japan) Stitch!	Seven Network	11 May	
(United States) The Penguins of Madagascar	Network Ten	13 May	
(United Kingdom) Come Fly With Me	Nine Network	16 May	
(Canada) / (France) Mona the Vampire	ABC1	20 May	
(Canada) Almost Naked Animals	ABC3	27 May	
(United Kingdom) Outcasts	ABC1	28 May	
(United States) The Defenders	Network Ten	1 June	
(United Kingdom) World Famous For Dicking Around	7mate	20 June	
(United States) Wilfred	Eleven	28 June	
(United States) The Glee Project	Eleven	15 July	
(United States) Rated A for Awesome	ABC3	15 July	
(United Kingdom) Gaspard and Lisa	ABC2	29 July	
(United States) Secret Mountain Fort Awesome	Network Ten	1 August	
(United States) The Voice	GO!	9 August	
(United States) Suits	Seven Network	15 August	
(Wales) / (United Kingdom) Fireman Sam (CGI)	ABC2	19 August	
(United States) The Looney Tunes Show	Nine Network	20 August	
(Republic of Ireland) / (Canada) Camelot	Nine Network	28 August	
(United States) Same Name	Nine Network	31 August	
(Japan) Pokémon: Black & White	Network Ten	10 September	
(United States) Person of Interest	Nine Network	25 September	
(United States) Charlie's Angels	Nine Network	27 September	
(United States) Prime Suspect	Nine Network	28 September	
(United States) Terra Nova	Network Ten	2 October	
(France) Kaeloo	ABC3	3 October	
(United States) Unforgettable	Nine Network	6 October	
(United States) Ringer	Network Ten	9 October	
(United Kingdom) Iconicles	ABC2	28 October	
(United States) The League	One	18 October	
(United Kingdom) Frozen Planet	Nine Network	30 October	
(United States) Mobbed	Network Ten	30 October	
(United States) American Horror Story	Eleven	1 November	
(United States) The Killing	One	2 November	
(United Kingdom) Raa Raa the Noisy Lion	ABC2	4 November	
(Japan) Beyblade: Metal Masters	Eleven	8 November	
(Canada) / (Singapore) Franklin and Friends	ABC2	9 November	
(United Kingdom) Bob the Builder: Ready, Steady, Build!	ABC2	10 November	
(United States) Sons of Tucson	Network Ten	17 November	
(United States) Top Gear	GO!	26 November	

=== Subscription television ===
Program	Network	Debut date	Reference/s
(United States) Pair of Kings	Disney Channel	31 January	
(United States) Shake It Up	Disney Channel	February	
(United States) Free Radio	The Comedy Channel	5 February	
(Japan) Bakugan: Mechtanium Surge	Cartoon Network	8 March	
(Japan) Naruto Shippuden	Cartoon Network	8 March	
(United Kingdom) Louie Spence's Showbusiness	Arena	9 March	
(United States) Neighbors from Hell	Fox8	13 March	
(United Kingdom) Big Fat Gypsy Weddings	LifeStyle You	20 June	
(United States) Power Rangers Samurai	Nickelodeon	2 July	
(United States) Falling Skies	Fox8	7 July	
(United States) Game of Thrones	Showcase	17 July	
(United States) Planet Sheen	Nickelodeon	21 July	
(United States) A.N.T. Farm	Disney Channel	15 August	
(Canada) / (Hungary) / (Republic of Ireland) The Borgias	W	29 August	
(United Kingdom) Mob Wives	LifeStyle You	August	
(United States) Awkward	MTV Australia	5 September	
(United States) / (United Kingdom) / (Republic of Ireland) The Amazing World of Gumball	Cartoon Network	1 October	
(United States) America's Got Talent	Fox8	6 October	
(United States) The Secret Circle	Fox8	31 October	
(United States) / (Canada) My Little Pony: Friendship Is Magic	Cartoon Network	31 October	
(Japan) Dragon Ball Z Kai	Cartoon Network	1 November	
(United States) Kung Fu Panda: Legends of Awesomeness	Nickelodeon	5 December	
