= Salsano =

Salsano is an Italian surname. Notable people with the surname include:

- Fausto Salsano (born 1962), Italian football manager and former player
- SallyAnn Salsano (born c. 1974), American television producer
