= StorageTreasures.com =

Online auction platform

StorageTreasures.com is an online auction platform and is managed by OpenTech Alliance, an automation and call-center provider for self storage companies. Founded in 2010, StorageTreasures gives people the ability to search for both online and in person self storage auctions. It also provides services for professionals in the self storage industry in the United States and Canada.

StorageTreasures represents over 18,500 storage facilities to complete more than 40,000 average auctions each month.

In February 2013, the site reported the purchase of a storage locker formerly owned by model and television personality Tila Tequila.

The site has also been featured in multiple broadcast and print news stories, including Fox News, ABC News Philadelphia and the Orange County Register.
