= Sex (Tila Tequila EP) =

EP by Tila Tequila
- Released: March 20, 2007
- Recorded: 2004; Sweden
- Genre: Pop rock; electronic
- Length: 20:06
- Label: The Saturday Team

Tila Tequila chronology
Sex (2007)	Welcome to the Dark Side (2010)

Sex is the debut studio EP by American recording artist Tila Tequila. It was released on March 20, 2007 by the Washington-based label The Saturday Team. Released shortly after her debut single, "I Love U", the EP was allegedly not authorized for release by Tequila, which led The Saturday Team and distributor Icon Music Entertainment Services to sue her over breaching her contract related to the album. The Saturday Team won the legal case and made Sex available for digital download on September 22, 2008 via iTunes Store.

== Composition ==
Sex is an electronic pop rock record, which also contains elements of other genres such as punk rock, new wave and classical music. Tequila wrote most of the songs from the perspective of her alter ego Jane.

The EP opens with a new-age world music introduction which transitions into an electric guitar instrumental. The second track, "Sex", is an electronic rock song with elements of classical music. "Little Brat" is a punk rock new wave song. Lyrically, it is about "a little rich girl that lives off her daddy's money". The fourth song, "Rat Room", is about fighting with her alter ego Jane, who wants to "destroy everything she has made". Tequila sings: "Eyes shut she just won't go away/Get help that's what my friends would say/But I can't I will just let her be/Because Jane is actually only me".

== Critical response ==
Professional ratings
Review scores
Source	Rating
AllMusic	1/5 stars

Upon its release, Sex received mixed to negative reviews from critics. Stephen Thomas Erlewine at AllMusic gave it only one star out of five, mostly criticizing its production. He remarked that "she's not trashy enough to be a guilty pleasure and she's not bad enough to be memorable, she's just boring".

== Track listing ==
No.	Title	Length
1.	"Intro"	3:05
2.	"Sex"	3:41
3.	"Little Brat"	3:12
4.	"Rat Room"	3:24
5.	"Summer Nightfalls"	2:55
6.	"Lipstick Flavored Cherries"	3:49
Total length:		20:06

== Credits and personnel ==
- Tila Tequila – vocals, songwriter
- Claire Ejanda – artwork
- Misha – photography

== Release history ==
Region	Date	Format	Label	Ref.
United States	March 20, 2007	CD	The Saturday Team	
United States	September 22, 2008	Digital download	The Saturday Team	
Worldwide	April 29, 2014	Digital download	The Saturday Team	
