= Fangasm =

- Country of origin: United States
- Original language: English
- No. of seasons: 1
- No. of episodes: 6

Production
- Production company: 495 Productions

Original release
- Network: Syfy
- Release: September 24 – October 22, 2013

Fangasm is a reality television show that screened on SyFy in 2013. The series followed seven people as they worked as interns for Stan Lee's Comikaze Expo (now known as the L.A. Comic Con), and included guests such as Stan Lee and George Takei. Although some felt that the series handled the subjects well, Fangasm was criticised by Andy Khourio as "nakedly exploitive of geek culture", and was accused of being created in order to promote Comikaze.
