= Stripper Friends =

Single by Tila Tequila
- Released: October 9, 2007
- Recorded: September 2007
- Genre: Pop rock; Hip hop; R&B
- Length: 3:46
- Label: StratArt
- Songwriter: Aimee Allen
- Producer: Damon Elliott

Tila Tequila singles chronology
"I Love U" (2007)	"Stripper Friends" (2007)	"Paralyze" (2008)

"Stripper Friends" is a song recorded by American recording artist Tila Tequila. It was released as her second single on October 9, 2007. Written by Aimee Allen, it is a cover version of her song of the same name from her album I'd Start a Revolution If I Could Get Up in the Morning (2002). Kevin Michael also reworked the song in 2007 under the title "We All Want the Same Thing". "Stripper Friends" became the theme track of the second season of Tequila's dating reality show, A Shot at Love II with Tila Tequila.

"Stripper Friends" received mixed reviews from music critics and was a commercial failure. It sold less than 1,000 copies in its first week and failed to enter any of Billboard charts.

An accompanying music video was released on February 26, 2008. It first premiered on Yahoo! Music and became available via iTunes on March 4, 2008.

== Track listings and formats ==
- Digital download
1. "Stripper Friends" – 3:46
- Digital download (Remixes)
1. "Stripper Friends" (Macutchi Remix) – 7:10
2. "Stripper Friends" (RevoLucian Club Remix) – 7:52
3. "Stripper Friends" (DJ F's Breakshop Studios Remix) – 5:20
4. "Stripper Friends" (Ghazi / Crunk Remix) – 3:25
5. "Stripper Friends" (Mike Lange's 2ASides Remix) – 3:34
6. "Stripper Friends" (RevoLucian Radio Edit) – 6:59

== Music video ==
Tequila dancing in a strip club in the "Stripper Friends" music video

The music video for "Stripper Friends" was shot in December 2007 in a Los Angeles strip club Crazy Girls. Amanda Ireton, from Tila's reality show A Shot at Love with Tila Tequila, also made a cameo in the video as a stripper. The plot of the music video involves Tila Tequila portraying a stripper, who is in a relationship with another female stripper at the club where they work. After Tila finds her girlfriend giving a very special private dance to another man, she confronts her girlfriend and flees from the club only to come face-to-face with the same man. She makes to grab him by his collar, but decides to kiss him passionately instead. The two return to the club and cloister themselves in a private booth until they are interrupted by Tila's girlfriend, who catches the two in the act. The girlfriend walks away in disgust. Tila then kicks her male suitor out and closes the private booth curtain. The music video premiered via Yahoo! Music on February 26, 2008 and became available via iTunes on March 4, 2008.

Tila also posted a total of five "behind the scenes" videos recorded from the set of the video shoot. Four videos were recorded by a camera crew and one was recorded by Tila Tequila herself from her own camera. They are all available for viewing at Tila's official website.
