= Blue Collar Millionaires =

American television docu-series

- Genre: Documentary; Docu-series
- Country of origin: United States
- Original language: English
- No. of seasons: 2
- No. of episodes: 12

Production
- Executive producers: Joel Zimmer; Pam LaLima; SallyAnn Salsano
- Camera setup: Multiple
- Running time: 30 minutes

Original release
- Network: CNBC
- Release: July 15, 2015 – February 22, 2017

Blue Collar Millionaires is an American television docu-series that airs on CNBC. The series follows different Americans with blue collar occupations who have become millionaires. The eight part half-hour series was commissioned by CNBC in January 2015 and is produced by 495 Productions..

== Broadcast ==
The series premiered in America on CNBC on July 15, 2015, with two episodes airing back-to-back. Two new episodes premiered for the following three weeks. A second season debuted on January 4, 2017 consisting of 10 episodes airing across five weeks with Tim McGraw as narrator.. The Latin American version was titled "Nuevos Millonarios", aired on Discovery Channel during 2018 and 2019, and was narrated by argentine voice actor Mariano Smolarczuk.

== Episodes ==
=== Season 1 (2015) ===
No.	Title	Original release date	U.S. viewers (thousands)
1	"Trash to Cash"	July 15, 2015	N/A
A concrete pourer explains how he earned enough to live in a mountain mansion, a woman turns her fondness for horses into an empire and two best friends quit the corporate world to instead make money throwing out rubbish.
2	"Just Killin' It"	July 15, 2015	N/A
Find out how a man from Texas makes a killing cleaning up hazardous products, an exterminator who makes millions from squishing bugs and a couple's fortune from the tattoo industry.
3	"Reap What You Sew"	July 22, 2015	N/A
Find out how a farmhand began an auto empire, a couple made a fortune farming unusual animals and how a musician made a career in industrial curtains.
4	"Smells Like Money"	July 22, 2015	N/A
Follow how a man gets rich in the oil game, a taxidermist makes his fortune and an immigrant gets filthy rich in the waste disposal industry.
5	"A Whole Can of Worms"	July 29, 2015	363,000
Discover how a technician from Florida became a leader, a couple from California made money from worms and a college dropout turns junk into treasure.
6	"Through the Roof"	July 29, 2015	N/A
Find out how a local roofer rose to the top, a landscaper grew his part-time job into an empire and an immigrant from India who owns a series of service stations.
7	"Out of the Ashes"	August 5, 2015	360,000
Meet a LA mechanic who found business in an underground car culture, a father and son who started a flooring business inspired by wild fires and a manufacturing mogul from Detroit.
8	"Money Grows on Trees"	August 5, 2015	310,000
We meet a man who went from driving a limo to being driven in one, an arborist who built a business and a roofer who got rich.

=== Season 2 (2017) ===
No.	Title	Original release date	U.S. viewers (thousands)
1	"The Flooring Kings"	January 4, 2017	473,000
2	"The Legend of Mickey Redwine"	January 4, 2017	330,000
3	"Married with Gators"	January 11, 2017	314,000
4	"Tow Fetish"	January 11, 2017	248,000
5	"Seeing Green"	January 18, 2017	268,000
6	"The Millionaire Chimney Sweep"	January 25, 2017	242,000
7	"Soldier of Fortune"	February 1, 2017	218,000
8	"The Mammoth Hunter"	February 8, 2017	251,000
9	"I'll Never Tire of It"	February 15, 2017	272,000
10	"Fake It Till You Make It"	February 22, 2017	323,000
