= That's Amore! (TV series) =

American reality television series

- Created by: Riley McCormick
- Developed by: Sally Ann Salsano
- Directed by: Scott Jeffress
- Starring: Domenico Nesci
- Country of origin: United States
- No. of seasons: 1
- No. of episodes: 6 (7 counting specials)

Production
- Executive producers: SallyAnn Salsano; 495 Productions
- Running time: 60 minutes (including commercials)

Original release
- Network: MTV
- Release: February 24 – April 6, 2008

That's Amore! is a reality television show that aired on MTV in early 2008. It is a spin-off of MTV's A Shot at Love with Tila Tequila. The show stars Domenico Nesci, who had been a contestant on A Shot at Love. One of the other contestants from the previous show, Ashley McNeely, helps Nesci find his true love as his consigliere. During the run of the series, 15 American women compete for Domenico's heart in a series of challenges. The winner was Megan Mirilovich.

== Format ==
Similar to A Shot at Love with Tila Tequila, episodes typically include challenges (either team or individual) with a date with Domenico as the prize. Nesci deliberates with Ashley his consigliere near the end of the episode and an elimination ceremony takes place. During elimination, Domenico calls forward the women that he chooses to remain in the mansion and presents them with an Italian flag while asking "Will you be my bambina?"

Although Megan won, she and Domenico didn't stay together long, breaking up after only a month. It was reported that they just moved on with their lives.

== Episodes ==
- Special: Domenico's Passport to Love (originally aired February 24, 2008)
- Ep. 1 Love is in the Hair (originally aired March 2, 2008)
- Ep. 2 Rival Sirens (originally aired March 9, 2008)
- Ep. 3 Love Hurts (originally aired March 16, 2008)
- Ep. 4 Disco Disaster (originally aired March 23, 2008)
- Ep. 5 Go Kart 4 My Heart (originally aired March 30, 2008)
- Ep. 6 We're Going to Italy! (originally aired April 6, 2008)

== Contestants ==
Name	Eliminated
Megan	Winner
Kim	Runner-up
Kathleen	Episode 5
Talor	Episode 5
Christina	Episode 4
Ashley	Episode 3
Missy Giesler	Episode 3
Rebecca	Episode 3
Jessica	Episode 2
Cristal (Love)	Episode 2
Dominique	Episode 1
Hunter	Episode 1
Katherine	Episode 1
Kristen	Episode 1
Nicole	Episode 1

== Call-out order ==
Domenico's call-out order
No.	Contestants	Episodes					
No.	Contestants	1	2	3	4	5	6
1	Megan	Talor	Rebecca	Talor	Kim	Megan	Megan
2	Kim	Missy	Megan	Kathleen	Talor	Kim	Kim
3	Kathleen	Kim	Kathleen	Megan	Kathleen	Kathleen	
4	Talor	Ashley	Ashley	Kim	Megan	Talor	
5	Christina	Christina	Kim	Christina	Christina		
6	Ashley	Love	Missy	Ashley			
7	Missy	Megan	Christina	Missy			
8	Rebecca	Kathleen	Talor	Rebecca			
9	Jessica	Jessica	Jessica				
10	Love	Rebecca	Love				
11	Dominique	Dominique					
12	Hunter	Hunter					
13	Katherine	Katherine					
14	Kristen	Kristen					
15	Nicole	Nicole					

The contestant won the competition.
The contestant won a date with Domenico.
The contestant won 2 dates with Domenico.
The contestant won a date with Domenico, but was removed from the competition due to violence.
The contestant won a date with Domenico, but was eliminated.
The contestant was eliminated.
