= Ikki Twins =

American identical twin models and television personalities

- Born: Erica & Victoria Mongeon; February 18, 1981 (age 45); Greensburg, Pennsylvania, U.S.
- Other names: Rikki & Vikki
- Occupations: Reality television stars; models
- Years active: 2004–present
- Known for: A Double Shot at Love

Erica "Rikki" Mongeon and Victoria "Vikki" Mongeon (born February 18, 1981), better known by the stage name the Ikki Twins, are identical twin models, and television personalities. They are best known as the stars of the MTV reality dating show A Double Shot at Love.

== Career ==
=== Modeling ===
The twins started their career working as waitresses at a Hooters restaurant and were featured in Hooters calendars. They gained recognition when they were asked to model on a motorcycle website. The twins have appeared in several magazines, including Playboy. They have also modeled for calendars including Umbrella Girls USA, Sexy Corvettes, and Playboy's Leather Catalog. They have worked as a runway models for Playboy, as well as Playboy Cyber Girls, and have won the title of Super Cyber Girl. Import Tuner voted the twins two of the top 25 Hottest Girls of All Time.

=== Television ===
The twins starred in the reality television spin-off of A Shot at Love with Tila Tequila, called A Double Shot at Love. The show featured 12 men and 12 women seeking the affections of the twins. The twins have served as co-hosts for Steve Harvey's Big Time Television Show and Criss Angel's television show.

=== Bartending ===
As of February 2017, the twins work as the resident bartenders at Banditos Tacos and Tequila, a local University of Southern California bar.

== Personal life ==
The twins were born in Greensburg, Pennsylvania and lived in nine different states before residing in San Diego, California. They have both stated that they are bisexual; Rikki discovered it first and did not mention it until Vikki later discovered she was.

On March 2, 2010, Rikki Mongeon was put in a medically induced coma after emergency surgery when doctors found blood on her brain following a car accident when they were clipped by a semitruck in Bakersfield, California. On March 6, she was brought out of her coma.
