= Step Brothers Two =

Mixtape by Don Trip & Starlito
- Released: October 15, 2013
- Genre: Southern hip-hop
- Length: 49:21
- Producers: Yung Ladd; BarNone; Drumma Boy; Chizzy; DJ Burn One; Fate Eastwood; Lil Lody; Sarah J; Sonny Digital; Street Symphony; Young Chop

Don Trip & Starlito chronology
Step Brothers (2011)	Step Brothers Two (2013)	Step Brothers Three (2017)

Professional ratings
Review scores
Source	Rating
AllMusic	3.5/5 stars
Robert Christgau	(3-star Honorable Mention)
Pitchfork	7.7/10

Step Brothers Two is the second collaborative mixtape by American rappers Don Trip and Starlito. It was released independently on October 15, 2013, following up to their 2011 release of Step Brothers and preceding their 2017 release of Step Brothers Three. Production was handled by eleven record producers, including DJ Burn One, Drumma Boy, Sonny Digital, Street Symphony and Young Chop. It features guest appearances from Billy Falcon, Kevin Gates, Robin Raynelle and Singa B.

The album debuted at number 71 on the Billboard 200 albums chart in the United States. To date, this is the most charted project for both artists.

== Track listing ==
No.	Title	Writer(s)	Producer(s)	Length
1.	"Paper, Rock, Scissors"	C. Wallace; J. Shute; T. Esmond; BarNone	BarNone; Street Symphony	3:14
2.	"28th Song"	C. Wallace; J. Shute; C. Gholson	Drumma Boy	2:55
3.	"Leash on Life" (featuring Kevin Gates)	C. Wallace; J. Shute; K. Gilyard; B. Pickens	Yung Ladd	4:00
4.	"Bunk Beds"	C. Wallace; J. Shute; A. Kearney	Lil Lody	3:58
5.	"Shut Up"	C. Wallace; J. Shute; C. Gholson	Drumma Boy	3:39
6.	"Pimp C 3000"	C. Wallace; J. Shute; S. Uwaezuoke	Sonny Digital	4:40
7.	"4x4 Relay"	C. Wallace; J. Shute; C. Stephens III; Sarah J	Chizzy; Sarah J	2:43
8.	"Caesar and Brutus"	C. Wallace; J. Shute; B. Pickens	Yung Ladd	4:09
9.	"DNA" (featuring Billy Falcon)	C. Wallace; J. Shute; B. Falcon; BarNone	BarNone	3:56
10.	"Open Your Eyes" (featuring Robin Raynelle)	C. Wallace; J. Shute; R. Raynelle; T. Hendry	Fate Eastwood	4:08
11.	"Ninja Focus"	C. Wallace; J. Shute; T. Pittman	Young Chop	3:28
12.	"Something for Nothing"	C. Wallace; J. Shute; B. Pickens	Yung Ladd	3:44
13.	"Where Do We Go" (featuring Singa B)	C. Wallace; J. Shute; D. Sweeten; Singa B	DJ Burn One	4:47
Total length:				49:21

== Personnel ==
- Jermaine Eric Shute – main artist
- Christopher "Don Trip" Wallace – main artist
- Kevin Jerome Gilyard – featured artist (track 3)
- Billy Falcon – featured artist (track 9)
- Robin Raynelle – featured artist (track 10)
- Singa B – featured artist (track 13)
- BarNone – producer (tracks: 1, 9)
- Torrance Esmond – producer (track 1)
- Christopher James Gholson – producer (tracks: 2, 5)
- Brian Pickens – producer (tracks: 3, 8, 12)
- Antoine Kearney – producer (track 4)
- Sonny Corey Uwaezuoke – producer (track 6)
- Charles "Chizzy" Stephens III – producer (track 7)
- Sarah J – producer (track 7)
- Terrance Hendry – producer (track 10)
- Tyree Pittman – producer (track 11)
- David Sweeten – producer (track 13)

== Charts ==
Chart (2013)	Peak position
US Billboard 200	71
US Top R&B/Hip-Hop Albums (Billboard)	17
US Top Rap Albums (Billboard)	10
US Digital Albums (Billboard)	24
US Independent Albums (Billboard)	16
