= Tray Chaney =

American actor

Tray Chaney (born c. 1982) is an American actor and musician. He appeared on the HBO program The Wire as Malik "Poot" Carr, which became his most successful acting role. He also appears in the Bounce TV soap opera Saints & Sinners as Kendrick.

== Career ==
Chaney began his entertainment career as a dancer at the age of four, winning competitions at the Apollo Theater. He appeared in the 2003 music video "My Baby" by rap artist Bow Wow. He later appeared in The Wire BET Promo Shoot commercial in 2006. He has also appeared on America's Most Wanted, playing a fugitive named "Jerry Robinson."

Chaney initially auditioned for the role of Wee-Bey Brice in The Wire, and while he was unsuccessful, the producers of the show created the character of Poot for him; producer Robert F. Colesberry was responsible for coming up with the name "Poot". He starred in Saint & Sinners as Kendrick.

He released his self-published book entitled The Truth You Can't beTray in January 2007. He has produced a number of movies and his own line of fragrances, as well as being a recording artist.

== Personal life ==
Chaney grew up in Forestville, Maryland and lives with his wife in Locust Grove, Georgia. He has a son named Malachi.

On May 29, 2025, an EF-2 tornado destroyed his residence in Locust Grove, Georgia and critically injured his 18-year-old son, Malachi Chaney, who was thrown approximately 300 feet from his bedroom into nearby woods.

== Filmography ==
=== Film ===
Year	Title	Role	Notes
2003	Head of State	Extra	
2004	Something the Lord Made	College Student	TV movie
2005	The Salon	JJ's Homeboy	
2008	Cash Rules	-	Video
2009	What We Do	-	Video
2011	Streets	Troy	
2011	Queen of Media	Chris	
2012	Dead Money	Tiger	
2012	Epitaph	-	Short
2012	Playground the Movie	Redbull	
2012	Lorenzo & Monica	Lorenzo	
2012	Raising Wolves	Ox	
2013	Good Brutha Bad Brutha	Ironman	
2013	6 Hearts 1 Beat	Davarius White	
2013	Masterminds	Rocket	
2014	The Weekend	Brandon	
2016	Drop: A Story of Triumph	-	Short
2016	Guns and Grams	Rico	
2016	A Way Out	Victor	Short
2017	Never Fall in Love	Nigel	
2017	Hit a Lick	Darius/D-Rax	
2017	The Barrel	Sam Livingston	
2019	Looking in the Mirror	Tee	
2019	Angels in Rocket Field	Kid Dash	Short
2019	The Portrait	Anthony Parker	Short
2019	The Probe	Munch	TV movie
2020	Guns and Grams	Rico	
2020	Zeke	Rock	
2020	Detective MJ: Shadow of a Hero	MJ	
2020	No Remorse	Detective Reeves	
2020	Expiration Date 143	Dajuan Weeks	Short
2021	Truthless	Omar Green 'OG'	Short
2021	Saints & Sinners Judgment Day	Kendrick	TV movie
2021	Secret Society	O	
2021	Ayanna Shon's Christmas Hypnosis	Hypnotist	
2021	Thanksgiving Roast	Preston	
2021	Black Lies	Mike	
2022	Trophy Wife	Detective Anderson	
2022	Queen of Hearts	David	
2022	We Need to Talk	Tango Unchained	
2022	Absence of Innocence	Willie	

=== Television ===
Year	Title	Role	Notes
2002–08	The Wire	Malik "Poot" Carr	Recurring cast: Seasons 1–4, guest: season 5
2016–21	Saints & Sinners	Kendrick Murphy	Guest: season 1, main cast: season 2–6
2018	Groads Bay High	Mr. Anthony Jackson	Episode: "Episode 1 & 2"
2019	Transitions	Mario Daniels	Episode: "Nigerian Nightmare"
2020	Boomerang	Barber	Episode: "End of the Road"
2020	Chase Street	Haas	Episode: "Who Can You Trust"
2021	Peace Be Steel	Robin Keller	Episode: "I'm Steel Holding On"
2022	We Own This City	Gordon Hawk	Episode: "Part One & Two"
