= Tila Tequila =

American media personality (born 1981)

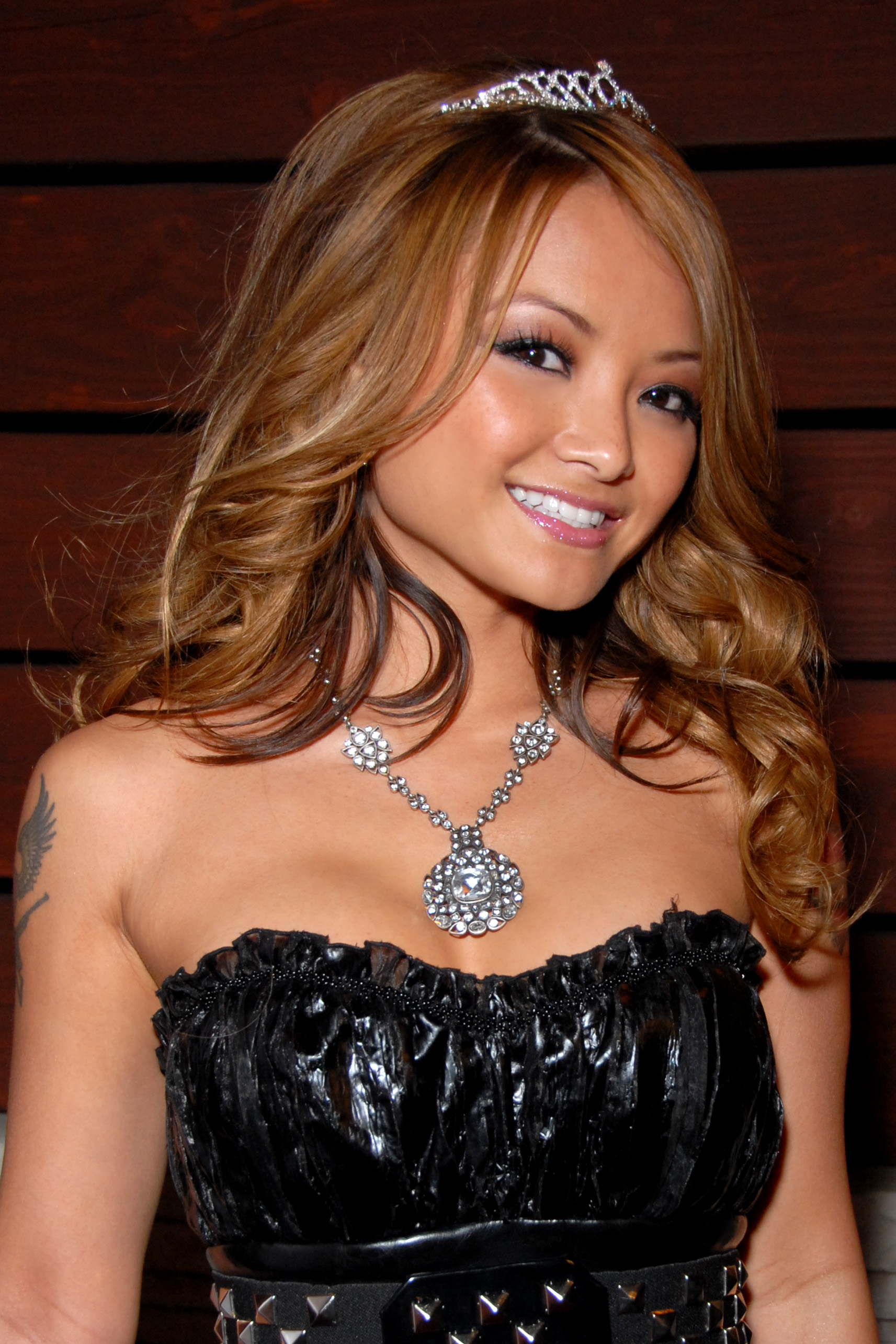
- Tequila in 2008
- Born: Nguyễn Thị Thiên Thanh; October 24, 1981 (age 45); Singapore
- Other names: Tila Nguyen; Miss Tila; Tornado Thien
- Occupations: Model; television personality; singer
- Years active: 2001–present
- Children: 2
- Musical career
- Genres: Hip-hop; pop rap; pop rock; electropop
- Instrument: Vocals
- Labels: The Saturday Team; will.i.am Music Group

Nguyễn Thị Thiên Thanh (born October 24, 1981), better known by her stage name Tila Tequila, is an American model, singer, and reality TV actress. She has also used the names Tila Nguyen, Miss Tila and Tornado Thien. Born in Singapore and raised in Houston, Texas, Tequila moved to Los Angeles in 2001 to pursue her modeling career. She first gained recognition for her active presence on social networking websites. After being featured as a model in numerous men's magazines (including Playboy, Stuff and Maxim), she made her reality television debut on the VH1 show Surviving Nugent (2003). After becoming the most popular person on Myspace, Tequila was offered the opportunity to star in her own reality television series. Her bisexuality-themed dating show, A Shot at Love with Tila Tequila (2007), aired for two seasons and became MTV's second-highest-rated series premiere of that year.

In addition to her career in modeling and television, Tequila also pursued her career as a recording artist. She was the lead singer of the bands Beyond Betty Jean and Jealousy, before launching a solo career. Her debut single "I Love U" was released in 2007 to mixed reviews. Despite having strong online sales, the song failed to enter any charts. Tequila followed with several independently released singles, including "Stripper Friends" and "Paralyze". In 2010, she released her second EP, Welcome to the Dark Side. Her book, Hooking Up With Tila Tequila: A Guide to Love, Fame, Happiness, Success, and Being the Life of the Party, was published in 2008.

She has long used social media and personal blogs to post her comments and has made posts that are described as antisemitic and homophobic. In a 2013 blog post, she expressed her support and admiration of Adolf Hitler. When these comments came to light in 2015, they led to her removal from Celebrity Big Brother; she blamed depression and drug use for the comments. She has also made associations with Neo-Nazism and the alt-right.

== Early life ==
Nguyen was born in Singapore, where her family were Vietnamese boat people, who arrived from Vietnam after the Vietnam War. Nguyen has an older brother, Daniel, and an older sister, Terri. When she was one year old, the family relocated to a neighborhood in Houston, Texas and was eventually admitted to a gated community run by a strict Buddhist temple. The family left the community when Nguyen was eight. She says she became rebellious and used the drug ecstasy at 11, and says "I used to rob houses, steal cars and stuff. And it just got worse in high school.” This led to her being sent to a reform school for six months.

Nguyen was nicknamed "Tila Tequila" by friends due to her apparent allergy to alcohol. In her memoir, she would later explain that she felt "confused" and "lost" by various personal family and environmental issues. She turned to writing poetry in an attempt to release powerful emotions. At age 16, Nguyen ran away to Queens, New York City, for several months. While still 16, she experienced a drive-by shooting in Houston. She reports having become pregnant and suffering a miscarriage the following year.

Nguyen graduated from Alief Hastings High School in 2000. She has cited her violent adolescence in Texas as her reason for becoming a model and moving to California in 2001. In a March 2003 interview, she revealed that she has taken some college classes but does not have a degree, stating, "I didn't want to go to college for an actual degree because there's nothing out there I like besides doing something that involves the entertainment industry."

== Career ==
=== 2001–2005: Modeling career, Beyond Betty Jean and Myspace ===
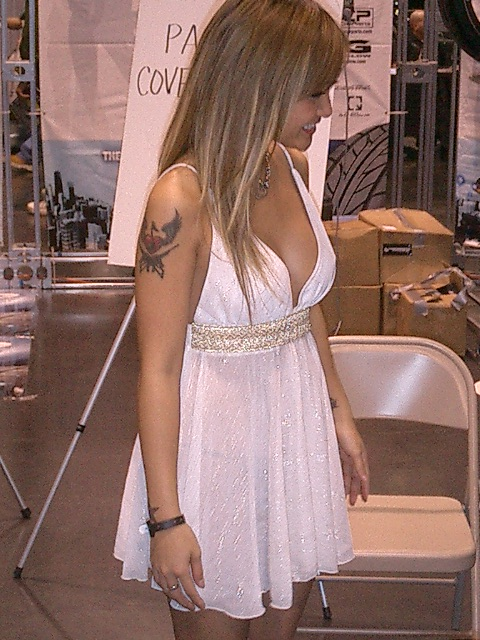
Tequila at a car show in December 2005

Nguyen's modelling career began when she posed for a friend's calendar. Then, at the age of 19, she was discovered at the Sharpstown Mall by a Playboy scout and was offered a chance to model nude for the magazine. She did a test shoot, then eventually moved to Southern California and was featured as Playboy's Cybergirl of the Week on April 22, 2002, and soon thereafter she became the first Asian Cyber Girl of the Month. A few more pictorials for the magazine followed.

At age 20, Nguyen acted on her interest in rock music and started looking for bands willing to let her join. She eventually assembled a band called Beyond Betty Jean, for which she was singer and songwriter. Beyond Betty Jean eventually broke up and Nguyen started working in recording studios to sharpen her vocal skills and wrote music. Later, she became the lead singer of a band called Jealousy, which released a few songs online before breaking up. In 2003, Nguyen was a contestant on VH1's Surviving Nugent, a reality TV show where participants performed compromising tasks and stunts for rock star Ted Nugent.

Nguyen gained further popularity through the import racing scene. She has been featured on the cover of Import Tuner magazine, at car shows such as Hot Import Nights, and in the video game Street Racing Syndicate. Nguyen joined Myspace in the fall of 2003 after getting booted off of Friendster multiple times. She says that "At that time no one was on there at all. I felt like a loser while all the cool kids were at some other school. So I mass e-mailed between 30,000 and 50,000 people and told them to come over. Everybody joined overnight." She eventually amassed 1.5 million followers on the site and turned it into a business venture selling merchandise. At her maximum, she had 1,771,920 MySpace friends.

=== 2006–2009: Solo career, and A Shot at Love ===
During the first season of Fuse TV's dance show, Pants-Off Dance-Off, on which a group of contestants strip to music videos, Nguyen was the most frequent host. In April 2006, during the taping of an interview with MTV's Total Request Live VJs, will.i.am announced that Nguyen had been signed to the Will.I.Am music group, a record label under A&M Records. Despite this major-label signing, Nguyen independently released her first single "I Love U" through iTunes on February 27, 2007, justifying the independent release through her desire to become famous by herself. She also shot a music video for the song. In March 2007, Washington-based record label The Saturday Team released an EP called Sex, by Tila Tequila. On July 27, 2007, Italian website MusicBlob reported that The Saturday Team and distributor Icon Music Entertainment Services sued Nguyen over breaching her contract related to the album. However, Nguyen claimed in a MySpace bulletin that the EP was not authorized for release by her, and was removed from most retailers. The Saturday Team won a legal case, making Sex available for digital purchase. Nguyen made an appearance as one of the 12 strangers in the first game on April 6, 2007, episode of NBC's game show Identity. On March 4, 2007, she made a cameo appearance on the show The War At Home. She also appeared as a Hooters Girl in the 2007 film I Now Pronounce You Chuck and Larry.

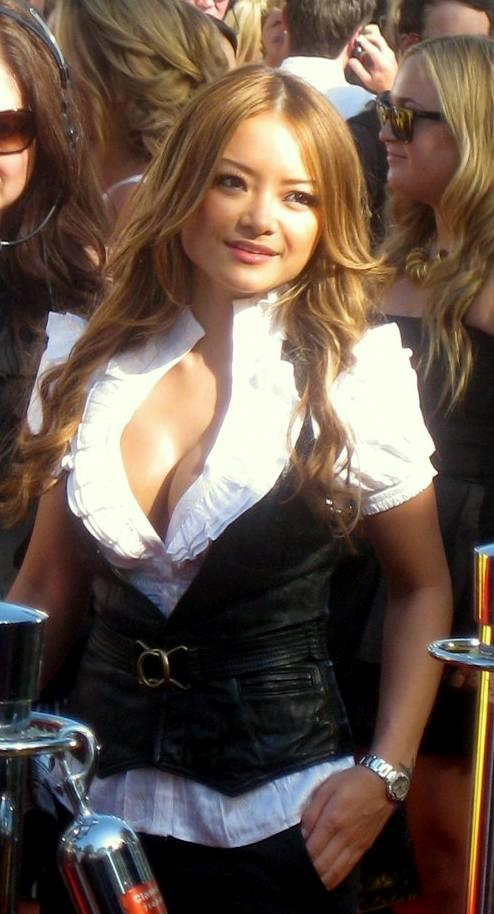
Tequila at the 2008 MTV Video Music Awards

In May 2007, Nguyen began filming for a reality show which first aired on MTV on October 9, 2007, as A Shot at Love with Tila Tequila. The program was a bisexual-themed dating show where 16 straight men and 16 lesbian women competed for Nguyen's affections, the twist being that the contestants were not aware of her bisexuality until the end of the first episode. The ten-episode series was produced by SallyAnn Salsano and MTV. The show led to a heated online debate between Nguyen and conservative Christians after an article appeared on The Christian Post on September 13, 2007. After seeing the article, Nguyen wrote an impassioned response in her blog on September 28, 2007, criticizing churches for "bashing" the gay community while thanking God for saving her life. The show premiered for a second season in April 2008 and became a popular gossip subject in Asian media, such as AsianWeek. The season finale premiered July 8, 2008, the winner being Kristy Morgan, who declined her "shot at love".

On October 9, 2007, Nguyen released her second official single, "Stripper Friends". A video premiered via Yahoo! Music on February 26, 2008, and was released to iTunes on March 4, 2008. The single failed to chart. In April 2008, the single "Paralyze" and its accompanying music video were released via Yahoo! Music and iTunes. The "I Love U Remixes" EP was released to digital music retailers on April 7, 2009. On December 2, 2008, Nguyen released a self-help book, Hooking Up with Tila Tequila: A Guide to Love, Fame, Happiness, Success, and Being the Life of the Party (ISBN 9781439101537).

=== 2010–2014: Welcome to the Darkside and hiatus ===
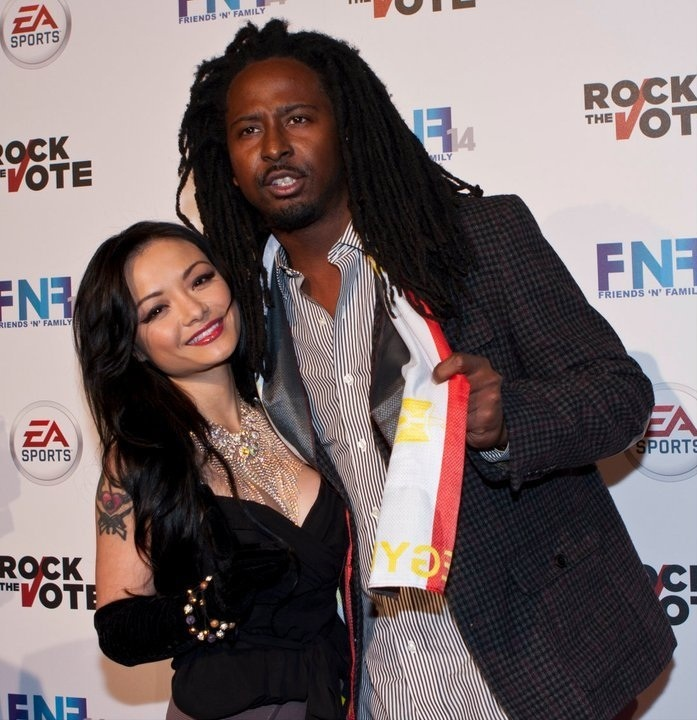
Tequila and Matchstick at the 14th Grammy Friends 'N' Family Party, 2011

By 2010, Tequila decided to reinvent her image and changed her stage name to Miss Tila. Her first single released under the new moniker was "I Fucked the DJ", along with an edited version entitled "I Love My DJ". Released under her newly established label Little Miss Trendsetter, the single received negative reviews and failed to be successful in charts. In May, she launched her celebrity gossip blog, MissTilaOMG.com, and the EP, Welcome to the Darkside, which marked a musical departure from her previous material. Influenced by classical music and artists such as Nina Simone and Billie Holiday, Welcome to the Darkside received more positive reviews. However, it did not manage to gain commercial success.

Tequila began a tour supporting the new EP and at one of her tour stops in August 2010, she appeared at the Gathering of the Juggalos, a music festival founded by hip hop duo Insane Clown Posse. She was repeatedly pelted with rocks and bottles among other objects, and she vowed to take legal action against the organizers and promoters for the event.

During this time, a sex tape featuring a lesbian threesome in which she performed was leaked. Tequila tried to buy back the tape before its release, but could not come to terms with Vivid Entertainment. In mid January 2014, she starred in her second sex tape with Vivid, Tila Tequila 2: Backdoored & Squirting, for which she won the 2015 AVN Award for "Best Celebrity Sex Tape".

=== 2015–2019: Celebrity Big Brother and return to music ===
In May 2015, it was announced that Nguyen was working on new music. In June, she posted a snippet of the song "Drunk Dialing" on her Instagram and wrote it would be released in the Summer. In August, she became one of the contestants on the sixteenth season of Channel 5 reality series Celebrity Big Brother. However, she was ejected from the house after just one day, due to many viewer complaints of her controversial statements made in 2013, when she posted antisemitic comments and praised Nazi dictator Adolf Hitler on Facebook. Tequila posted a snippet of "Drunk Dialing" again in September and confirmed it would be released by the end of October along with a music video. In November, Tequila and her management confirmed the single would be released on December 4. Tequila also announced her own line of e-liquids for vaporizers in collaboration with Blaze Vapors. In 2018, she began using the name Tornado Thien on YouTube.

In 2019, she stated she wanted to produce a gospel album, asking her subscribers on YouTube to donate to her GoFundMe to raise money to produce it.

=== Online ventures ===
In July 2001, Nguyen started the website TilasHotSpot.com, which later began redirecting to MissTila.com. Originally the site featured information, quotes, blog, and pictorials requiring adult verification and a monthly fee. Later, the site was revamped to feature all-ages content and information to promote her career, business ventures, personal information, and a premium membership section including videos, non-nude picture galleries, blogs, and chat sessions. In 2008 the site was transformed into a social network.

During 2005, Nguyen launched TilaFashion.com, a site featuring her custom line of clothing for men and women. In 2006, Nguyen created another website, TilaZone.com which features content to use on Myspace and other social networking websites including layouts, widgets, and clipart.

In December 2009, Nguyen partnered with Joe Francis to launch the now-defunct dating website TilasHotSpotDating.com, aimed at people ages 18 and up. The site included a free membership with basic access, and paid membership for other areas of the site. Nguyen took in webcam chats on the site.

In 2010, Nguyen launched a celebrity blog site, MissTilaOMG.com; it transformed into her personal blog in 2012.

As of 2018, Nguyen sells artwork online under the name of Tornado Thien.

== Public image ==
Nguyen was featured on the cover of the April 2006 issue of Stuff magazine; in the interview, she claimed that her nickname "Tila Tequila" came about when she experimented with alcohol at the age of 13. She appeared on the August 2006 Maxim UK cover, was named #88 in their Hot 100 List, and also appeared in the December 2007 issue. She was ranked #100 on the Maxim Hot 100 list in 2008.

Nguyen has been featured on the front page of magazines such as Penthouse, King, Blender, and most recently Steppin' Out.

== Political views ==
In December 2013, Nguyen posted an article on her website titled "Why I Sympathize with Hitler: Part I". In the post she calls Hitler "a good man" and additionally a "man of compassion." Additionally, she also posted a photo of herself with a Nazi armband, posing with a gun in front of a photo of the Auschwitz concentration camp. In other posts, she also said that she believes that Eastern European Jewish people are descended from the Khazar people. On her blog she also claimed that Elisa Lam and Paul Walker were killed in "ritualistic murders".

In 2015, she endorsed Donald Trump for President and cited his opposition to Trans-Pacific Partnership as a reason.

In August 2015, Nguyen became a contestant in the sixteenth series of British television reality game show Celebrity Big Brother, but was asked to leave the program on its second day when producers became aware of her comments about Hitler and photos. She subsequently apologized for her earlier comments, blaming them on depression and drug addiction saying that she is “deeply sorry for my irresponsible, reckless and selfish actions and I hope that everyone can forgive me for the pain that I may have caused.”

On May 6, 2016, Nguyen tweeted that Jewish-American political commentator Ben Shapiro should "be gassed and sent back to Israel" and later posted that "There are only two things in this world, for which I would gladly sacrifice my own life; the destruction of all Jews and preservation of the white race" and "You know what will help Asians earn respect? An Asian version of Adolf Hitler… I want that person to be me; I want to save the world from this Zionist disease!".

In June 2016, Nguyen accused Sarah Silverman and the Jews of killing Jesus before saying the comedian was next on a "celebrity sacrifice" list.

She has made associations with the alt-right and neo-Nazism. On November 19, 2016, she attended an alt-right National Policy Institute meeting celebrating the election of Donald Trump, organized by white supremacist Richard B. Spencer, and posted photos on social media of herself doing a Nazi salute. One was posted to Twitter with the text "Seig heil!" [sic] and a raised hand. On November 22, 2016, her account was suspended by Twitter. Consequently, she joined Gab.

She has expressed her views on several scientific topics as well. Tequila released a video on YouTube expressing anti-vaccine views saying "vaccines causes 240% of black boys to have Autism." She has also claimed she believes the Earth is flat.

== Personal life ==
=== Health ===
On February 29, 2012, Tequila was hospitalized after she overdosed on pills in an attempted suicide which resulted in her suffering a brain aneurysm. On March 7, upon being discharged from the hospital, she agreed to enter rehab for substance abuse and treatment of psychological issues at the Palm Partners recovery center in Florida. Tequila completed her rehab treatment on April 5, 2012.

=== Sexuality ===
By the end of 2007, Tequila was linked to the winner of her dating show A Shot at Love with Tila Tequila, Bobby Banhart. In January 2008, she revealed that she and Banhart had ended their relationship. Shortly afterwards, Banhart posted a message on his Myspace stating he had never dated Tequila and that she "never called him after the last show and no one would give him her number." Tequila later came out as a lesbian rather than a bisexual and stated that she wanted to pick the show's runner-up Dani Campbell but the producers made her pick Banhart.

In March 2018, Tequila uploaded a video to YouTube, saying that she was neither lesbian nor bisexual. She only pretended to be lesbian and bisexual in order to create ratings for A Shot at Love with Tila Tequila; she had a boyfriend while filming the show. Additionally, she associated homosexuality with the Devil and referred to former contestants of the show as "degenerate" and "disgusting".

=== Relationships and children ===
On December 9, 2009, Tequila stated she was engaged to heiress Casey Johnson, daughter of businessman Woody Johnson, and was photographed with a diamond ring. Johnson died on January 4, 2010, of complications resulting from diabetic ketoacidosis.

Tequila began dating musician Thomas Paxton Whitaker (born 1971) in 2013, which ended due to Whitaker's financial problems. On April 18, 2014, Tequila confirmed her pregnancy on her Facebook page. Tequila gave birth to her first daughter, Isabella Monroe Nguyen, on November 16, 2014. In September 2018, Tequila gave birth to her second child, also a daughter.

=== Legal issues ===
On September 6, 2009, Tequila was allegedly strangled and restrained by former boyfriend Shawne Merriman, who was later arrested. San Diego district attorney Bonnie Dumanis decided not to charge Merriman after her office spent three days reviewing reports from the San Diego County Sheriff's Department. On November 17, 2009, Tequila sued Merriman for $1.5 million. Several weeks later, Merriman countersued, alleging intentional interference with contract, unfair competition, and trademark infringement. She declined to respond to his more recent actions and a default judgment was entered in his favor for $2 million. However, the default judgment was later set aside in January 2010. In February 2010, both sides jointly moved the court to dismiss the claim, and the court dismissed the case on the same day.

== Filmography ==
=== Film ===
Year	Title	Role	Notes
2007	I Now Pronounce You Chuck & Larry	Hooters Girl	Cameo
2011	Tila Tequila Uncorked!	Herself	Straight to DVD
2013	Masterminds	Monae	
2014	Tila Tequila 2: Backdoored and Squirting	Herself	Straight to DVD

=== Television ===
Year	Title	Role	Notes
2003	Surviving Nugent	Herself	Reality TV
2008	Robot Chicken	Herself/Karate Instructor/Lawyer/Steve's Wife (voice)	Episode: "Help Me"
2007	A Shot at Love with Tila Tequila	Herself	Reality TV
2007	The War at Home	Herself as Tila Tequila	
2008	A Shot at Love II with Tila Tequila	Herself	Reality TV
2010	The Cleveland Show	Herself as Tila Tequila (voice)	2 episodes
2011	$#*! My Dad Says	Ting-Ting	Episode: "Ed Goes to Court"
2012	NY Ink	Herself	
2014	E! True Hollywood Story	Herself	Episode: "Life After Reality"
2015	Celebrity Big Brother: UK vs USA	Herself; Housemate	14th Place (2 Episodes); Ejected Day 2

== Bibliography ==
- Hooking Up with Tila Tequila: A Guide to Love, Fame, Happiness, Success, and Being the Life of the Party (2008)

== Awards and nominations ==
Award nominations for Tila Tequila
Year	Award	Category	Work	Result
2007	The Soup Award	Entertainer of the Year	—N/a	Won
2008	Bravo's A-List Award	A-List Drama Queen	—N/a	Won
2008	Guys Choice	So Hot They're Famous	—N/a	Won
2012	29th AVN Awards	Best Celebrity Sex Tape	Tila Tequila Uncorked	Nominated
2015	32nd AVN Awards	Best Celebrity Sex Tape	Tila Tequila 2: Backdoored & Squirting	Won
