= Nail Files =

Television series

- Genre: Reality
- Starring: Katie Cazorla; Walter Afanasieff
- Country of origin: United States
- Original language: English
- No. of seasons: 2
- No. of episodes: 16

Production
- Executive producers: Jay Baxter; Shaun Zaken; Paul Storck; Joel Zimmer; SallyAnn Salsano; Nicole Walberg
- Running time: 20 to 24 minutes

Original release
- Network: TVGN
- Release: June 20, 2011 – November 1, 2012

Nail Files is a reality television series that premiered on TV Guide Network in June 2011. It ran for 2 seasons and ended in October 2012.

Nail Files is created by the creators of Jersey Shore, and follows Katie Cazorla, who owns a popular Sherman Oaks salon called The Painted Nail, while juggling her relationship with Walter Afanasieff, a Grammy award-winning music producer.

The series follows Cazorla as she aspires to take The Painted Nail to the next level. With the support of Walter and her best friend Amy, Cazorla hosts gifting suites at the Sundance Film Festival and The Academy Awards, walks the red carpet at the Grammy Awards, launches her Spring line of polishes, and handles her celebrity clients all while placating her trouble-making staff.
