= Party Down South =

American reality television series

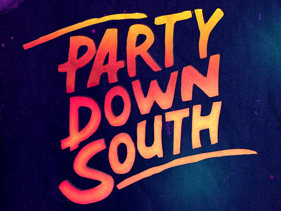
- Also known as: The Dirty South; Dirty South
- Genre: Reality
- Created by: SallyAnn Salsano
- Country of origin: United States
- Original language: English
- No. of seasons: 7
- No. of episodes: 86

Production
- Executive producers: SallyAnn Salsano; Joel Zimmer; Kyle Simpson; Jayson Dinsmore; Melanie Moreau
- Camera setup: Multiple
- Running time: 42 minutes
- Production company: 495 Productions

Original release
- Network: CMT
- Release: January 16, 2014 – April 14, 2016

Party Down South (also known as The Dirty South and Dirty South) is an American reality television series that premiered January 16, 2014, on CMT. The series was created by Jersey Shore executive producer SallyAnn Salsano and 495 Productions, and has thus far been set in five locations: Murrells Inlet, South Carolina; Athens, Georgia; Savannah, Georgia; Biloxi, Mississippi; and St. Petersburg, Florida. The latter two locations have served as the setting for Party Down South and the spinoff series Party Down South 2.

Party Down South depicts eight adults who are put together in a house for the summer. In October 2014, Party Down South was announced as CMT's highest-rated show, averaging over 930,000 viewers, which led to the making of two seasons of the spinoff show Party Down South 2.

On January 7, 2016, CMT announced that the fifth season, featuring the original Party Down South cast, would be the final season. The final season premiered on January 28, 2016, and concluded on April 14, 2016.

== Production ==
On March 5, 2013, it was announced during CMT's annual presentation attended by Viacom's top executives in New York City that CMT would be airing several new shows, including The Dirty South, that would premiere in late 2013. On July 27, 2013, WBTW announced that The Dirty South would be filmed in Murrells Inlet, South Carolina. Some locals are against the idea, as the name "Dirty South" does not represent the area and could hurt the area's reputation, but others are in favor of the show or say they will have an open mind. The series title was later changed to its current name, Party Down South.

Season one of Party Down South was filmed in Murrells Inlet, South Carolina. In July 2013, the owner of Drunken Jack's, Al Hitchcock, was approached by 495 Productions about filming in his restaurant. Hitchcock stated that he was not opposed to the idea and thinks it would be good for the area. He consequently allowed crews inside his restaurant and placed a bid to serve as the catering company for the more than 100 crew and cast members while they were in town.

In August 2014, Wright did not show up for the second-season reunion Party Down South: The After Party and all cast members stated she was no longer in contact with them. She cited religion and her pregnancy as why she would not be returning.

== Cast ==
Houseguests	Age	Hometown
Lyle A. Boudreaux	28	Lafayette, Louisiana
Mattie Breaux	24	Gheens, Louisiana
Hannah "Hott Dogg" Guidry (Season 3–5)	28	Cecilia, Louisiana
Tiffany Heinen	25	Eunice, Louisiana
Josh Murray	31	Louise, Mississippi
Ryan "Daddy" Richards	33	Orange Beach, Alabama
Lauren White	21	Pineville, Louisiana
Walt Windham	26	Frankfort, Kentucky
Taylor "Lil' Bit" Wright (Seasons 1–2)	23	Rockingham, North Carolina

Note: All ages are at the time of Season 1 filming, for the exception of Hannah "Hott Dogg" Guidry, who was 28 at the time she joined the cast in Season 3.

== Episodes ==
=== Season 1 (2014) ===
No. overall	No. in season	Title	Original release date	U.S. viewers (million)
1	1	"Black Out"	January 16, 2014	0.68
2	2	"Make Room for Daddy"	January 23, 2014	0.64
3	3	"Things Are Gonna Get Weird"	January 30, 2014	0.84
4	4	"It's My Birrrday"	February 6, 2014	0.73
5	5	"Did We Talk About Prison Yet?"	February 13, 2014	0.59
6	6	"Mattie Goes Martha On Everybody's A..."	February 20, 2014	0.73
7	7	"Heartburn or Heartbreak?"	February 27, 2014	0.53
8	8	"Cuddling Days Are Over"	March 6, 2014	0.73
9	9	"Rednecks in Heat"	March 13, 2014	0.48
10	10	"Paybacks a Fish"	March 20, 2014	0.73

=== Season 2 (2014) ===
The second season was originally set to be filmed in Pensacola, Florida, before the local community rejected the production over concerns of image portrayal of Pensacola Beach and wanting to "get away from the whole Redneck Riviera crap." The producers eventually settled on filming in Athens, Georgia, instead.

No. overall	No. in season	Title	Original release date	U.S. viewers (million)
11	1	"Hot Mess Express"	June 5, 2014	0.83
12	2	"We Gonna Fight, or We Gonna Kiss?"	June 12, 2014	0.61
13	3	"Lil' Bit of a Problem"	June 19, 2014	0.62
14	4	"Stop Stalking"	June 26, 2014	0.75
15	5	"Get Over Me"	July 3, 2014	0.58
16	6	"Love Is Blind. And Drunk."	July 10, 2014	0.74
17	7	"I Banged Your Girl"	July 17, 2014	0.72
18	8	"Hurricane Martha"	July 24, 2014	0.76
19	9	"I'm a Baboso, Baby!"	July 31, 2014	0.67
20	10	"Livin' La Vida Martha"	August 7, 2014	0.61
21	11	"What Happens in Cabo..."	August 14, 2014	N/A
22	12	"The Truth Comes Out"	August 21, 2014	N/A
23	13	"Out With a Bang"	August 28, 2014	N/A

=== Season 3 (2015) ===
Season 3 premiered on February 26, 2015. Filming took place in Biloxi, Mississippi.

No. overall	No. in season	Title	Original release date	U.S. viewers (million)
24	1	"Back in the Saddle"	February 26, 2015	0.71
25	2	"Battle of the Buns"	March 5, 2015	0.61
26	3	"29 Going on Thirsty"	March 12, 2015	0.58
27	4	"Spilling, Spelling, and Spaghetti"	March 19, 2015	N/A
28	5	"Gettin' On and Goin' Off"	March 26, 2015	0.41
29	6	"Between a Hott Dogg and a Hard Place"	April 2, 2015	N/A
30	7	"Some Type o'Way"	April 9, 2015	N/A
31	8	"Mixed Drinks and Mixed Signals"	April 16, 2015	N/A
32	9	"The Big Uneasy"	April 23, 2015	N/A
33	10	"Down This Road Before"	April 30, 2015	N/A
34	11	"Bye Bye, Biloxi!"	May 7, 2015	N/A

=== Season 4 (2015) ===
The fourth season premiered on August 20, 2015, and concluded on October 29, 2015. Filming took place in St. Petersburg, Florida.

No. overall	No. in season	Title	Original release date	U.S. viewers (million)
35	1	"I'll Show You Crazy!"	August 20, 2015	N/A
36	2	"Blood, Sweat and Beers"	August 27, 2015	N/A
37	3	"Miss Martha's Wild Ride"	September 3, 2015	N/A
38	4	"It's Not a Dream, It's a Vision"	September 10, 2015	N/A
39	5	"Sagin' Cajuns"	September 17, 2015	N/A
40	6	"Party Down, South Beach"	September 24, 2015	N/A
41	7	"Gone Girl"	October 1, 2015	N/A
42	8	"The Bou to My Dreaux"	October 15, 2015	N/A
43	9	"Happy Birthday, Martha!"	October 22, 2015	N/A
44	10	"We Got It Goatin'"	October 29, 2015	N/A

=== Season 5 (2016) ===
The fifth and final season premiered on January 28, 2016. Filming took place in Savannah, Georgia.

No. overall	No. in season	Title	Original release date	U.S. viewers (million)
45	1	"Taxicab Confessions"	January 28, 2016	N/A
46	2	"Lyle's Achy-Breaky Heart"	February 4, 2016	N/A
47	3	"She Devil Went Down to Georgia"	February 11, 2016	N/A
48	4	"Southern Discomfort"	February 18, 2016	N/A
49	5	"Cowboys and Ninjas"	February 25, 2016	N/A
50	6	"True Lies"	March 3, 2016	N/A
51	7	"Wild Lyle Down"	March 10, 2016	N/A
52	8	"Watermelon, Meet Lartha"	March 17, 2016	N/A
53	9	"Single on a Segway"	March 24, 2016	N/A
54	10	"Foul Weather Friend"	March 31, 2016	N/A
55	11	"Last Call"	April 7, 2016	N/A
56	12	"The Final Funnel"	April 7, 2016	N/A

=== Specials ===
No.	Title	Original release date	U.S. viewers (million)
SP1	"Drunksgiving"	November 19, 2014	N/A
SP2	"Christmas Hangover"	December 18, 2014	N/A

== Party Down South 2 ==
=== Cast ===
Houseguests	Age	Hometown
Kelsie Davenport (Season 2)	21	Yellville, Arkansas
Michael Duke	22	Statesboro, Georgia
Magan Ladner (Season 1)	23	Eunice, Louisiana
Bradley Mitchell	26	Brandon, Mississippi
Ashton Mosley	25	Pensacola, Florida
Hunter Robinson	23	Lexington, Kentucky
Raven "Barbi" Stein	23	Folsom, Louisiana
Tommy Theis	22	Blytheville, Arkansas
Karynda Worcester	26	Jacksonville, North Carolina

Note: All ages are at the time of Season 1 filming, for the exception of Kelsie Davenport, who was 21 at the time of Season 2.

=== Episodes ===
==== Season 1 (2014–15) ====
Season 1 premiered on November 20, 2014. Filming took place in Biloxi, Mississippi.

No. overall	No. in season	Title	Original release date	U.S. viewers (million)
1	1	"I Don't Do Dibs"	November 20, 2014	N/A
2	2	"Feel the Burn"	November 27, 2014	N/A
3	3	"Strictly Cuddle Buddies"	December 4, 2014	N/A
4	4	"Three's a Party"	December 11, 2014	N/A
5	5	"Bradley Who?"	December 18, 2014	N/A
6	6	"The Boss' Daughter"	January 1, 2015	N/A
7	7	"Sunday Funday"	January 8, 2015	N/A
8	8	"Fishin' for Trouble"	January 15, 2015	N/A
9	9	"Got Milk"	January 22, 2015	0.54
10	10	"Roll With the Punches"	January 29, 2015	0.55
11	11	"Meet My Dad, Brad"	February 5, 2015	0.37
12	12	"The Wild Karynda"	February 12, 2015	0.47

==== Season 2 (2015) ====
The second season, which was filmed in St. Petersburg, Florida, premiered on May 14, 2015. Cast member Magan Ladner did not be return for the second season, due to the birth of her daughter. New roommate Kelsie Davenport moved in.

No. overall	No. in season	Title	Original release date	U.S. viewers (million)
13	1	"Motorboats and Mustard"	May 14, 2015	N/A
14	2	"Two Can Play at this Game"	May 21, 2015	N/A
15	3	"Girl's Night!"	May 28, 2015	N/A
16	4	"Bringing Home the Bacon"	June 4, 2015	N/A
17	5	"Three's a Crowd"	June 11, 2015	N/A
18	6	"In and Out of Love"	June 11, 2015	N/A
19	7	"Hot Tub Cry Machine"	June 18, 2015	N/A
20	8	"Double Shot of Heartbreak"	June 25, 2015	N/A
21	9	"If the RV's A'Rockin', Don't Come A'Knockin'"	July 2, 2015	N/A
22	10	"Pie Fight!"	July 9, 2015	N/A

== Controversy and incidents ==
Since WBTW announced that show would be filmed in Murrells Inlet, crews from the production company had begun working on a large home called King's Krest, a 100-year-old house located on the Marshwalk. This location is intended to house the cast for about a month during the filming of the show, but word of the show has worried many locals about what the caricatured "reality" show could do to the peaceful fishing town's reputation. Local resident Warren Stedman stated "There was all this secrecy, they kept telling us it was a documentary, well no it's not. It's a reality show about a bunch of drunk 20-year-olds or whatever, coming in and pretending they're Southerners."

Many residents are upset that local officials did nothing to deter the production of a show that could have serious effects on the quiet vacation destination. Jerry Oakley, the vice chairman of the Georgetown County Council, stated "Any citizen who does not agree with the decision of the Zoning Administrator can immediately appeal it to the Board of Zoning Appeals, and that would be my suggestion to anyone who has issue with that decision." Oakley went on to point out that the county does not have the authority to stop someone from filming simply because they dislike the nature of the content.

On July 31, 2013, The Sun News reported that many locals are unhappy about Murrells Inlet being in the upcoming spotlight, especially if the show turns out to be similar to TLC's Myrtle Manor. People from Georgetown County express concern that the cast does not reflect the Southern character and hospitality for which the area is known. One resident is quoted saying "I think it is absolutely ridiculous, [and] it is humiliating. The kind of people that they are casting are not from here. We definitely have more manners than that."

Former Georgia congressman, The Dukes of Hazzard star Ben Jones has been openly critical of Party Down South since its debut and has even gone so far as to write a condemning open letter to Country Music Television and its parent company Viacom Media Networks regarding the show and its portrayal of southerners.

=== Legal problems ===
On February 23, 2014, cast member Lyle Boudreaux was arrested in Maurice, Louisiana, for burglary of a vehicle. TMZ later uploaded the security camera footage that recorded Boudreaux in the act.

In April 2014, cast member Mattie Breaux had a bench warrant issued for her arrest. This was the result of her failing to appear for a pre-trial hearing from a 2012 drunk-driving arrest. She said she was participating in filming for Season 2 in Athens, Georgia, at the time of the hearing.

In July 2014, cast member Ryan "Daddy" Richards was investigated by authorities in Athens, Georgia, after a woman initially told police that she had been sexually assaulted by "Daddy" after being slipped a date rape drug while partying with the cast during the filming of season 2. However, after reviewing approximately 20 hours of footage, police ultimately determined that the accusations had been proven false.

On November 15, 2014, cast member Josh Murray was arrested for DUI and driving with a suspended license in Rankin County, Mississippi, after failing a field sobriety test.

On February 8, 2015, Lyle Boudreaux was arrested again, this time in Lafayette, Louisiana, on charges of drunk driving, marijuana possession and bringing drugs into a jail following his arrest.

On October 25, 2018, Taylor Wright was arrested for punching her mother-in-law during an argument.
