= Surviving Nugent =

- Genre: Reality television
- Starring: Ted Nugent; Tila Tequila
- Country of origin: United States
- Original language: English

Production
- Running time: 60 minutes

Original release
- Network: VH1
- Release: 2003 – 2004

Surviving Nugent is an American reality television series starring Ted Nugent that aired on VH1.

== Overview ==
Surviving Nugent is television series where contestants travel to rock star Ted Nugent's Texas ranch and live and compete in events of Nugent's choice. The series was filmed near Waco. Nugent suffered injuries on the series from a chainsaw accident.
