= Repo Games =

American game show

- Genre: Game show
- Presented by: Josh Lewis; Tom DeTone
- Country of origin: United States
- No. of seasons: 2
- No. of episodes: 40

Production
- Executive producer: SallyAnn Salsano
- Production company: 495 Productions

Original release
- Network: Spike
- Release: April 26, 2011 – August 21, 2012

Repo Games is an American game show on Spike. The series debuted on April 26, 2011.

== Format ==
Hosts Josh Lewis and Tom DeTone are actual repo men. They visit actual owners of vehicles in danger of being repossessed and offer them a chance to have the debt fully paid off by playing a trivia game.

The game takes place wherever the vehicle is parked, usually in the owner's driveway. The vehicle is hooked up to a tow truck, and the owner is given a chance to win it back by answering five general-knowledge trivia questions. If the owner can answer three questions correctly, the vehicle is removed from the tow truck and the owner gets it back, with all delinquent payments and any outstanding loan balance paid off by the show. If not, the tow truck drives away with the vehicle, and the owner will have to pay off the debts themselves. The first series of episodes were filmed in Phoenix, Arizona, Las Vegas, Nevada, and Dallas, Texas. Some 80 vehicle owners took part in the show. The second series of episodes have included South Jersey and Indiana.

== Episodes ==
=== Season 1 (2011) ===
No.	Title	Original release date
1	"Wallace and the Green Machine"	April 26, 2011
2	"Darwin Makes a Break For It"	April 26, 2011
3	"Baby Knows Best"	May 3, 2011
4	"The Double Repo"	May 10, 2011
5	"Redneck Rampage"	May 17, 2011
6	"Bad Boys, Bad Boys"	May 24, 2011
7	"Who Let the Dogs Out!"	May 31, 2011
8	"Shots Fired"	July 12, 2011
9	"Grizzly Man"	July 12, 2011
10	"Bait and Repo"	July 19, 2011
11	"Pip Squeak Squawkin"	July 19, 2011
12	"Happy Ending"	July 26, 2011
13	"Bug Spray Attack"	July 26, 2011
14	"Heavy Lovin"	August 2, 2011
15	"Muscle Mayhem"	August 2, 2011
16	"Officer Friendly Knows Best"	August 9, 2011
17	"Mr. Sin City"	August 16, 2011
18	"Mrs. Robinson's Neighborhood"	August 23, 2011
19	"Booty Blockin'"	August 30, 2011
20	"Babysitter Badass"	September 6, 2011

=== Season 2 (2012) ===
No.	Title	Original release date
1	"No Underwear No Problems"	March 28, 2012
2	"Gunnin' for Payback"	March 28, 2012
3	"Johnnie Don't Know"	April 4, 2012
4	"Soul Brotha Chicken Wing"	April 17, 2012
5	"Hammertime"	April 17, 2012
6	"Bong Show"	April 24, 2012
7	"Country Quitter"	May 1, 2012
8	"Jaeger and the Wheelbarrow"	May 8, 2012
9	"Don't Tell Tom the Babysitter's Down"	May 15, 2012
10	"Feminem Loves to Dance"	May 22, 2012
11	"Mike Is the King of the Neighborhood"	June 12, 2012
12	"You'll Never Take Me Alive, Again"	June 19, 2012
13	"To Pee or Not to Pee"	June 26, 2012
14	"Even You Can Have a Stripper Wife"	July 10, 2012
15	"Kenton the Butcher"	July 17, 2012
16	"Barely Legal Lindsey"	July 24, 2012
17	"Old Man Nasty"	July 31, 2012
18	"Cops and Repos"	August 7, 2012
19	"Obama Lives in Sherwood Forest"	August 21, 2012
20	"Model Mayhem"	August 21, 2012

== Incidents ==
During filming for a Las Vegas episode of Repo Games, 40-year-old Carlos Barron shot at the show's film crew because the production van was parked outside of his home. He was later arrested for attempted murder. He was sentenced to 90 days in jail and five years of probation on June 24, 2014.
