= Starlito =

American rapper (born 1984)

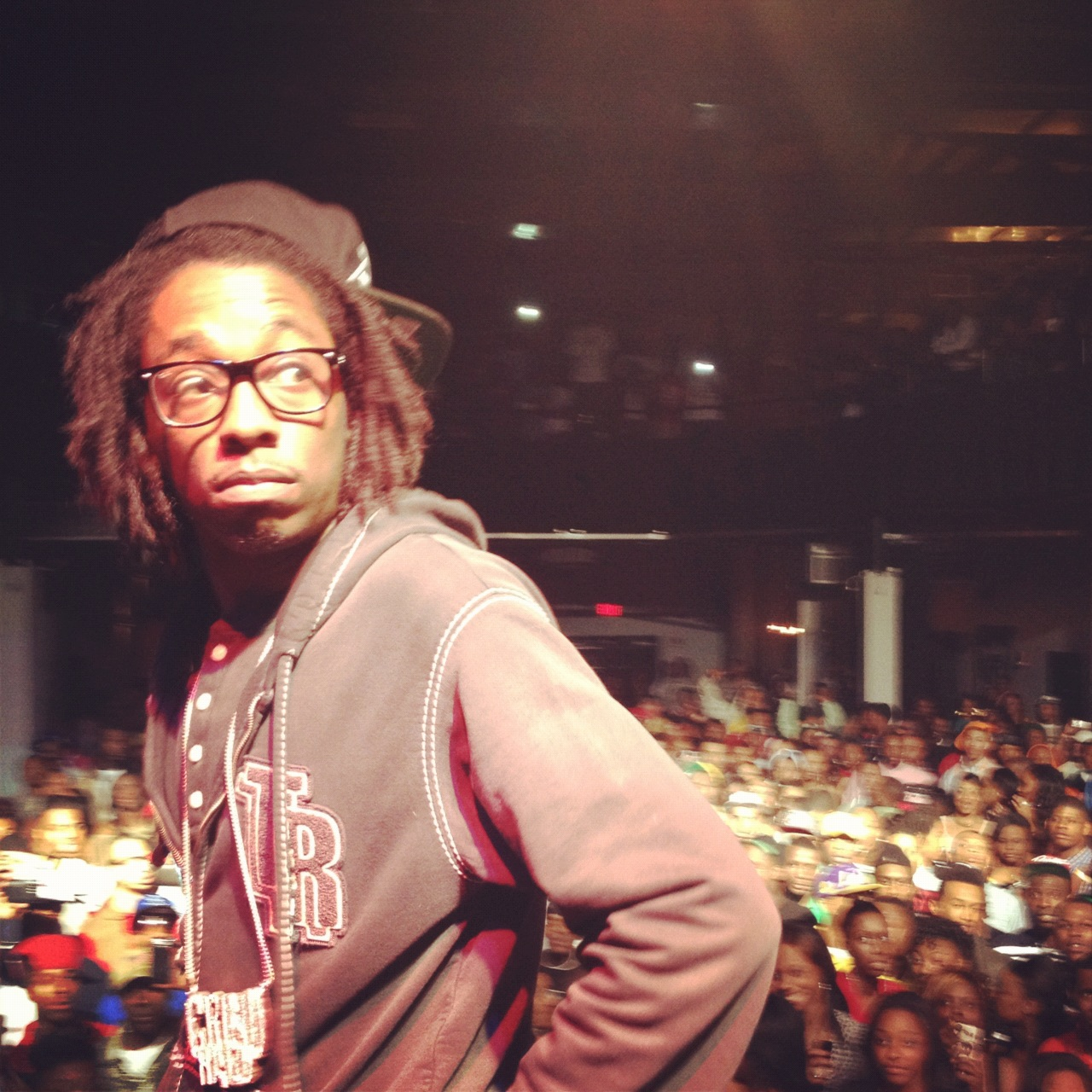

Background information
- Born: Jermaine Eric Shute; December 15, 1984 (age 41); Nashville, Tennessee, U.S.
- Genre: Southern hip-hop
- Occupation: Rapper
- Years active: 2002–present
- Labels: Cash Money, Inevitable, Grind Hard, Loyalty
- Website: grindhard.com

Jermaine Eric Shute (born December 15, 1984), better known by his stage name Starlito, is an American rapper. He gained his first national look for the 2005 song "Grey Goose", which featured artists Young Jeezy and Yo Gotti. His second single, released in 2007, was "Champagne Crazy", featuring then labelmate Lil Wayne. His third radio single was "I Go Ham" and would later also feature rapper Gucci Mane. During 2013 alone, Starlito's albums appeared on the Billboard Top 200 albums chart three times in a four-month span (Cold Turkey, Stepbrothers Two, and Fried Turkey). On March 15, 2017, Starlito and Don Trip released their Stepbrothers Three project, which was followed by a 43-city United States tour.

== Discography ==
- Vol. 1: It Ain't a Game No More (2002)
- Vol. 2: Who the Hell is All-Star? (2003)
- Vol. 3: It's About Business (2003)
- Vol. 4: Hatin' Ain't Healthy (2003)
- Vol. 5: Got Mine Get Yours (2005)
- Prince of the Ville: Underground Vol. 1 (2005)
- Starlito's Way: I Am Not Your Friend (2007)
- The Tenn-A-Keyan (2007)
- Starlito's Way II 2 disc album December 15 a Star Was Born & Internal Affairs (2008)
- Star & Gotti (with Yo Gotti) (2008)
- StarBucks (with Young Buck) (2008)
- The S.Lito Files (2008)
- The Ten-A-Keyan 2 (2009)
- I Love You Too (2009)
- I Love You, Too Much: The Necessary Evils (2009)
- I Still Love You: From the Back of Class (2009)
- The Tenn-A-Keyan 3 (Comics, Sports, Crimes & Courts) (2009)
- Free at Last (2010)
- Living in the Past (with Dolewite & Scooby) (2010)
- Terminator Gold 60 (2010)
- The Tenn-A-Keyan 3.5 (I'll Shoot Through Ya) (2010)
- Renaissance Gangster (2010)
- Starlito's Way 3: Life Insurance (2010)
- @ WAR w/ myself (2011)
- Step Brothers (with Don Trip) (2011)
- Ultimate Warrior (2011)
- #UW: Separation Anxiety (2011)
- For My Foes (2012)
- Mental WARfare (2012)
- Post Traumatic Stress (2012)
- Produced by Coop: The Starlito Tape (2012)
- Funerals & Court Dates (2012)
- Attention, Tithes & Taxes (2013)
- Cold Turkey (2013)
- Step Brothers Two (with Don Trip) (2013)
- Fried Turkey (2013)
- Insomnia Addict (2013)
- Theories (2014)
- Black Sheep Don't Grin (2014)
- Introversion (2015)
- Passed the Present (2015)
- I'm Moving to Houston (2015)
- Red Dot Free (2016)
- Step Brothers (Karate in the Garage) (2017)
- Manifest Destiny (2017)
- Step Brothers THREE (with Don Trip) (2017)
- Attention, Tithes & Taxes 2: Gentrifried (2017)
- Hot Chicken (2017)
- GhettOut: Insomnia Addict 2 (2017)
- GhettOut: Funerals & Court Dates 2 (2017)
- Starlito's Way 4: GhettOut (2017)
- Open Cases (with MobSquadNard) (2018)
- At WAR with Myself Too (2018)
- Trapstar (with TrapperMan Dale) (2018)
- Paternity Leave (2020)
- Cheap Phones & Turkey Bags (with Troy Money) (2022)
- Love Drug (2023)
- Imposter Syndrome (2024)
- 75am HARD Club (2025)
- Regretfully (2025)
- Step Brothers 4 Life (with Don Trip) (2025)
- Step Brothers Four & a Half (with Don Trip) (2025)
- Step Brothers 4 Life & After (with Don Trip) (2025)
- Not the Country You Know: Unhappy Hour (with Bandplay) (2026)
- Not the Country You Know: Last Call (with Bandplay) (2026)
- It's Strict Over Here (2026)
- Starlito's Way 5: Catharsis | Chrisopher Season 5 (with Don Trip) (2026)
