= Don Trip =

American rapper from Tennessee

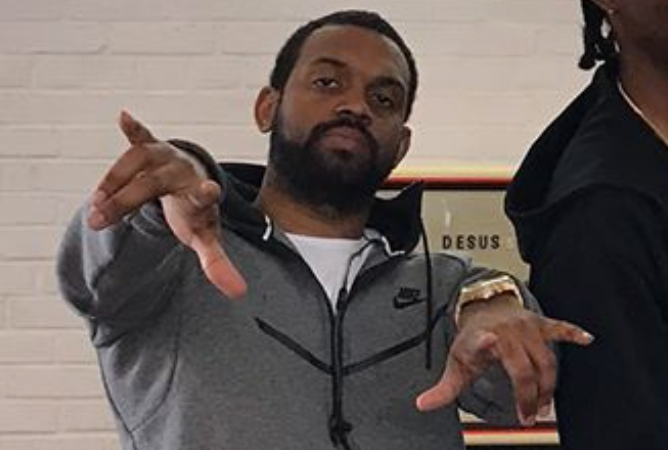
- Don Trip in 2017.

Background information
- Born: Christopher Wallace; August 20, 1985 (age 41)
- Origin: Memphis, Tennessee, U.S.
- Genre: Southern hip-hop
- Occupations: Rapper; songwriter; actor
- Years active: 2008–present
- Labels: Godspeed; Grind Hard; Interscope; Epidemic; First Family
- Children: 8
- Website: mrdontrip.net

Christopher Wallace (born August 20, 1985), known professionally as Don Trip, is an American rapper. As a pioneer of the Memphis sound, he is perhaps best known for his 2011 single, "Letter to my Son" (featuring Cee Lo Green). Two years after a clip of him recording the song went viral on YouTube, he was signed by Cool & Dre's Epidemic Records, an imprint of Interscope Records, after which it was re-issued as his debut commercial single in October 2011. In addition, he was named an XXL Freshman the following year. After being dropped from the label, he continued work as an independent artist. His 2015 album, Godspeed, narrowly entered the Billboard 200. With Nashville rapper Starlito, he released the mixtape series Step Brothers.

== Early life ==
Don Trip grew up in the low-income East Memphis. Living in a fatherless household, he watched as his mother work three jobs and struggled to support him along with his brother and sister. At the age of 12, he began working to provide for his siblings, later saying that "all we ever had was us." At an early age, Don Trip was inspired by Jay-Z, Tupac, and Jadakiss. At 15, he noticed his family was falling apart, and felt the urge to do something more to help them. Inspired by the pre-teen duo of Kriss Kross, he began rapping and making music.

== Career ==
=== 2012: Early career ===
Trip's career began at 15, when he started rapping. After working on his craft, he began to release mixtapes and singles in the late 2000s, leading to a string of 9 projects being released between October 2010 (Crossface Crippler) and February 2012 (Guerilla). Releasing his mixtapes on websites such as Datpiff and HotNewHipHop, he began to amass a following as a street rapper.

His song "Letter to My Son" (originally released in 2009), went semi-viral on YouTube, fueling his transition toward mainstream hip-hop. The song, which detailed Trip's struggle with being unable to see his son due to a court ruling, was lauded for its accurate depiction of a hardship not often portrayed in rap music. In 2012, hot on the heels of "Letter to My Son," Trip was named one of XXL's 2012 freshmen, alongside artists including Future, Danny Brown, and Hopsin. Soon after, he was signed to Epidemic Records, a joint enterprise between production duo Cool & Dre and Interscope Records.

=== 2017–present: Step Brothers ===
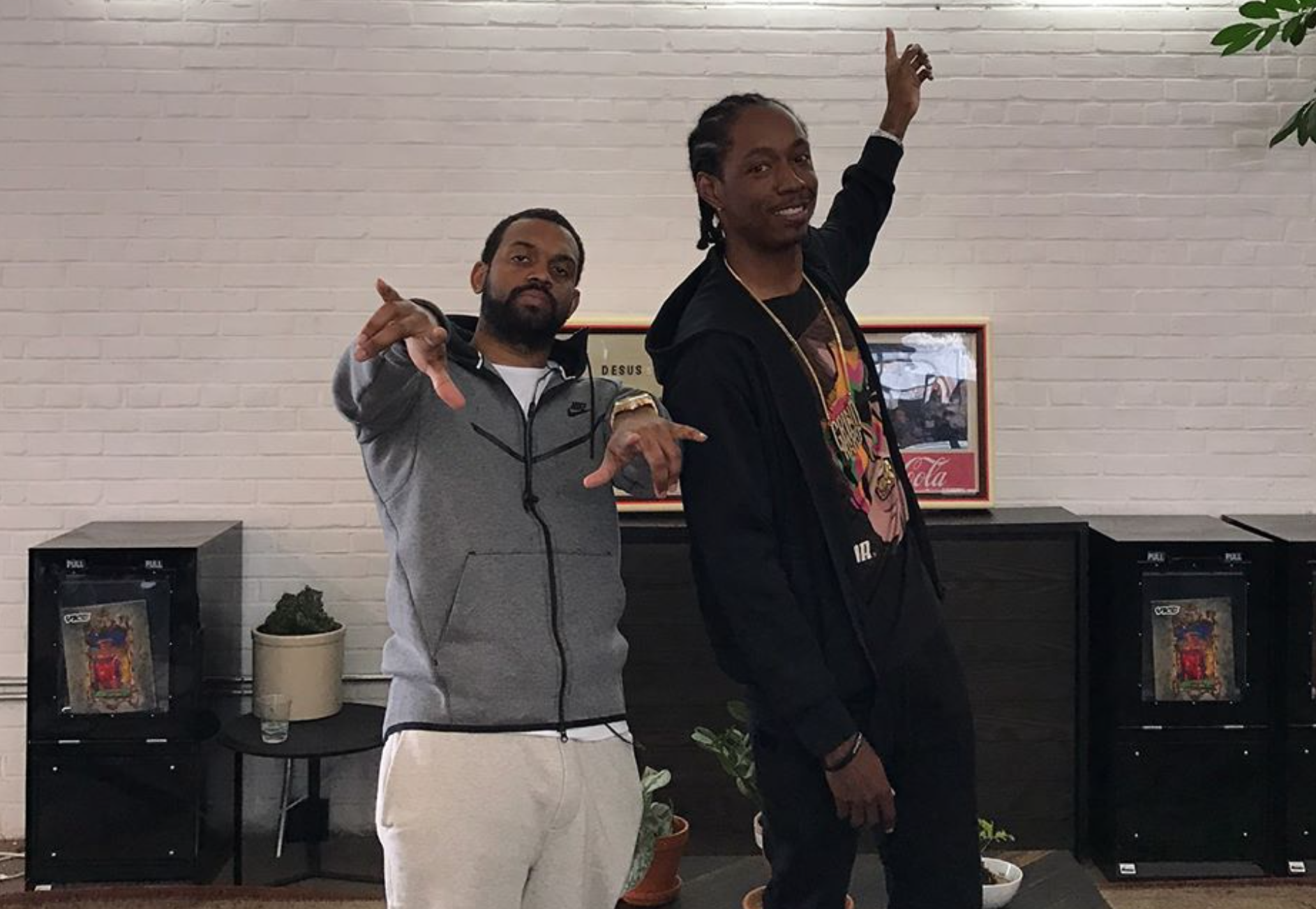
Don Trip with Starlito at the Vice Media office in 2017

Prior to his signing at Interscope, Trip scored big with his collaborative Step Brothers mixtape with Starlito. Released in 2011, the mixtape was peppered with references and in-jokes relating to the Judd Apatow movie Step Brothers, and gained a cult following among the rap community. A few months before the mixtape's release, Starlito and Don Trip were introduced to each other by Yo Gotti, with whom Trip was touring. Both rappers were already familiar with the other's music, and after discovering their musical compatibility, decided to make a joint project. Three studio sessions later, Step Brothers was fully recorded. Due to the success of the mixtape as well as their collaborative chemistry, Starlito and Trip continued to collaborate, releasing the Step Brothers 2 mixtape in 2013. While Trip was based in Memphis while Starlito was based in Nashville, the two continued to meet up in person to record, never emailing each other songs back and forth. In 2017, the two linked up again for the third installment of the Step Brothers series, preceded by the Karate in the Garage collaborative mixtape. Released independently, like the two previous mixtapes, Step Brothers 3 received widespread critical acclaim from publications such as Pitchfork, XXL, and USA Today.

== Personal life ==
In May 2022, he married a Memphis nurse, who gave birth to his second son. As of December 2023, Don Trip has eight children, two sons and six daughters, by four different women.

== Discography ==
=== Mixtapes/EPs ===
Name	Year	Notes
Surviving da Drought	2009	
The Threat	2010	
Human Torch	2010	
Crossface Crippler	2010	
Terminator	2010	
Free D Boi	2010	
Human Torch 2	2011	
Step Brothers	2011	Collaboration with Starlito
Marvel Mixtape: Dub Edition	2011	
Terminator 2	2011	
iHeart Strippers	2011	
Human Torch 3	2011	
Guerilla	2012	
Help Is on the Way	2012	
Step Brothers Two	2013	Collaboration with Starlito
Randy Savage	2014	
Godspeed	2015	
In the Meantime	2015	
In the Meantime 2	2016	
The Head That Wears the Crown	2016	
2 Clip Trip	2016	
Step Brothers: (Karate in the Garage)	2017	Collaboration with Starlito
Step Brothers Three	2017	Collaboration with Starlito
Free Roy, Free Fletch	2017	
Christopher	2018	
Don't Feed the Guerrillas	2019	
They Don't Love You	2019	
Lethal Weapon	2019	Collaboration with Criminal Manne
Pray God's Not Watching	2021	
Christopher Season 2	2022	
Gotham City	2023	
iHeartStrippersToo	2023	
The Devil You Know	2023	
Shoulders of Giants	2023	
Die Another Day	2023	
Long Live Pif	2023	Collaboration with Pif
Fireworks	2023	
Hell's Kitchen	2023	
1207 James St	2023	
Red October	2023	
Wolverine	2023	
Christopher Season 3	2023	
Frostbite	2024	
iHeartStrippersTrois	2024	
Before the Devil Knows You're Dead	2024	
This Message Will Self Destruct	2024	
Mayhem	2024	
In Loving Memory	2024	Collaboration with Pif
Freedom Fighter	2024	
Que Sera Sera	2024	
Revenge of the Fallen	2024	
Your's Truly	2024	
Behind Enemy Lines	2024	
Christopher Season 4	2024	
Gladiator	2025	Compilation
King of Hearts	2025	Compilation
The Devil You Know (Deluxe)	2025	4 New Songs
Step Brothers 4 Life	2025	Collaboration with Starlito
Step Brothers Four & a Half	2025	Collaboration with Starlito (8 New Songs)
Forgiveness Is God's Job... Part 1	2025	
Step Brothers 4 Life & After	2025	Collaboration with Starlito (8 New Songs)
Forgiveness Is God's Job... Part 2	2025	
Forgiveness Is God's Job... Part 1 (Deluxe)	2026	8 New Songs
Forgiveness Is God's Job... Part 2 (Deluxe)	2026	8 New Songs
Armageddon	2026	Collaboration with Eddie Valero
Armageddon (Deluxe)	2026	Collaboration with Eddie Valero (10 New Songs)
Starlito's Way 5: Catharsis / Chrisopher Season 5	2026	Collaboration with Starlito
