= My Big Friggin' Wedding =

- Created by: Sean Gottlieb
- Developed by: SallyAnn Salsano
- No. of seasons: 1
- No. of episodes: 10

Production
- Executive producers: SallyAnn Salsano; Scott Jeffress; Rick Hankey; Kari McFarland; Shelly Tatro; Jeff Olde
- Production company: 495 Productions

Original release
- Network: VH1
- Release: January 6 – March 10, 2011

My Big Friggin' Wedding is a reality show airing on VH1. It follows 5 New Jersey couples as they prepare for their wedding.

== Couples ==
- Sandra Venturi and Joey Cimino
- Tammie and Danny
- Alyssa and Tyler
- Matt Rawlins and Amanda Perello
- Megin Klunck and Johnny "Meatballs" DeCarlo
