= A Double Shot at Love =

Television series

- Also known as: A Double Shot at Love with the Ikki Twins
- Presented by: Erica "Rikki" Mongeon; Victoria "Vikki" Mongeon
- Opening theme: "Ooh Uh Huh"
- Composer: Millionaires
- Country of origin: United States
- No. of seasons: 1
- No. of episodes: 8

Production
- Executive producers: SallyAnn Salsano; Scott Jeffress
- Running time: 60 minutes (including commercials)

Original release
- Network: MTV
- Release: December 9, 2008 – February 3, 2009

A Double Shot at Love with the Ikki Twins, also referred to simply as A Double Shot at Love, is an American reality television dating game show that first aired weekly on MTV from December 9, 2008 to February 3, 2009. It is a spin-off of A Shot at Love with Tila Tequila. A reboot of the show starring Vinny Guadagnino and DJ Pauly D of Jersey Shore fame premiered in April 2019.

== Format ==
A Double Shot at Love with the Ikki Twins is a bisexual-themed dating competition featuring 12 hetero males and 12 lesbian females living in a house with Rikki (Erica Mongeon) and Vikki (Victoria Mongeon) while competing for their attention and affection.

== Post-show ==
One of the contestants, Kandice (Kandi) Hutchinson, died in a car crash shortly after the end of production. Out of respect to her family, the producers edited Hutchinson's scenes to remove some of her more outrageous behavior. The second episode of the series was dedicated to her memory.

On August 4, 2010, Vikki posted on her Myspace blog that she and Trevor had split up.

== Episodes ==
| # | Title | First Aired |
|---|---|---|
| 1 | This Time, Let's Make it a Double! | December 9, 2008 |
| 2 | Kiss and (Don't) Tell | December 16, 2008 |
| 3 | Sticky and Sweet | December 23, 2008 |
| 4 | Lickety Split | December 30, 2008 |
| 5 | The Truth Will Set You Free | January 6, 2009 |
| 6 | Family Matters | January 13, 2009 |
| 7 | A Pair Beats Three of a Kind | January 27, 2009 |
| x | Special: Happy Hour: A Double Shot at Love Reunion | February 3, 2009 |
| 8 | Who Will They Choose? | February 3, 2009 |
| x | Special: A Double Shot at Love: One Shot Too Many | February 3, 2009 |

Episode numbering as per the episode list on the website

== Episode progress ==
=== Call-out order ===
| # | Contestants | Episodes | | | | | | | |
| # | Contestants | 1 | 2 | 3 | 4 | 5 | 6 | 7 | 8 |
|---|---|---|---|---|---|---|---|---|---|
| 1 | Angela | Elise | Rebekah^{[m]} | Trevor | Josh | Scott | Rebekah | Rebekah | Trevor |
| 2 | Bella | Jen | Trevor | Xoe | Trevor | Trevor | Trevor | Trevor | Rebekah |
| 3 | Ben | Kali | Nicky | Scott | Xoe | Rebekah | Scott | Scott | |
| 4 | Claudia | Kandi | Elise | Rosemarie | Rebekah | Rosemarie | Rosemarie | | |
| 5 | Corey ("Coop") | Nicky | Paul | Kali | Scott^{[m]} | Xoe | | | |
| 6 | Dana | Rebekah | Kali | Josh | Rosemarie | Josh | | | |
| 7 | David | Rosemarie | Matt | Nick | Kali | | | | |
| 8 | Elise | Xoe | Jen | Rebekah | Nick | | | | |
| 9 | Fazio | Ben | Scott | Elise | | | | | |
| 10 | Freddy | Coop | Josh | Jen | | | | | |
| 11 | James | James | Xoe | Matt | | | | | |
| 12 | Jen | Josh | Rosemarie | Nicky | | | | | |
| 13 | Josh | Matt | Nick | Paul | | | | | |
| 14 | Kali | Nick | Kandi | | | | | | |
| 15 | Kandice | Paul | James | | | | | | |
| 16 | Matt | Scott | Coop | | | | | | |
| 17 | Nick | Trevor | Ben | | | | | | |
| 18 | Nicky | David | | | | | | | |
| 19 | Paul | Freddy | | | | | | | |
| 20 | Rebekah | Fazio | | | | | | | |
| 21 | Rosemarie | Angela | | | | | | | |
| 22 | Scott | Bella | | | | | | | |
| 23 | Trevor | Claudia | | | | | | | |
| 24 | Xoe | Dana | | | | | | | |

The contestant won with both twins, but chose Vikki.
The contestant is female.
The contestant is male.
The contestant was eliminated.
The contestant won a challenge and went on a group date.
The contestant won a challenge and went on an individual date.
The contestant won two challenges and went on a group date and an individual date.
The contestant won a challenge, but was eliminated.
The contestant was eliminated outside of the elimination ceremony.
^{[m]}The contestant was deemed the "MVP" by the twins.

- The call-out order is the order in which the contestants were given keys.
- In episode one, the eliminated contestants were asked to return their keys. Alphabetical order is used for the contestants who were allowed to keep their keys.

=== Reasons for elimination ===
| Name | Eliminated | Reason for elimination |
|---|---|---|
| Angela | Episode 1 | The twins did not feel a connection with her. |
| Bella | Episode 1 | The twins were not into her tattoos. |
| Claudia | Episode 1 | The twins thought a dominatrix was too wild for them. |
| Dana | Episode 1 | The twins thought she was too boring. |
| David | Episode 1 | The twins were not into his tattoos. |
| Freddy | Episode 1 | The twins thought he was more interested in partying than love. |
| Fazio | Episode 1 | The twins thought he "came off too hard." |
| Ben | Episode 2 | The twins felt that he was clinging to innocence and comedy. |
| Coop | Episode 2 | The twins were disgusted by him farting during their alone time with him. |
| James | Episode 2 | The twins did not agree with his stance on gay marriage. |
| Kandi | Episode 2 | The twins saw her as a fun person to party with, but did not feel a connection. She died before this Episode was aired. |
| Elise | Episode 3 | The twins thought she did not try too hard in either of the challenges. |
| Jen | Episode 3 | The twins had a better connection with Rebekah. |
| Matt | Episode 3 | The twins had a better connection with Nick. |
| Nicky | Episode 3 | The twins did not have a strong connection with her. |
| Paul | Episode 3 | Though the specific reason for his elimination was not stated on air, it is implied that the twins did not have a connection with him. |
| Nick | Episode 4 | The twins felt like he did not make a connection with Vikki until it was too late. |
| Kali | Episode 4 | The twins thought she did not open up enough. |
| Josh | Episode 5 | The twins found out about his fling with Rosemarie, and they were furious that he kept changing his story about what happened. |
| Xoe | Episode 5 | The twins felt as if she was ashamed to bring them home to her dad, who did not know she was a lesbian. |
| Rosemarie | Episode 6 | The twins felt as if she was paying more attention to her dog than them when they went to meet her family; plus they did not get a good first impression of her family after seeing them get into a heated argument. |
| Scott | Episode 7 | Specific reason not stated on air. Implication that the twins had better connections with Trevor and Rebekah. |
| Rebekah | Episode 8 | Specific reason not stated on air. Implication that the twins had a better connection with Trevor. |

== Revival ==
In January 2019, MTV revived the show to now star Jersey Shore personalities Pauly D and Vinny Guadagnino. The revival premiered on April 11, 2019.
