= A Shot at Love with Tila Tequila =

American television series

- Created by: Riley McCormick
- Developed by: SallyAnn Salsano
- Directed by: Scott Jeffress
- Presented by: Tila Tequila
- Opening theme: "I Love U"
- Ending theme: "I Love U"
- Composer: Tila Tequila
- Country of origin: United States
- Original language: English
- No. of seasons: 1
- No. of episodes: 12

Production
- Executive producer: SallyAnn Salsano
- Running time: 60 minutes (including commercials)
- Production company: 495 Productions

Original release
- Network: MTV
- Release: October 9 – December 23, 2007

Related
- A Double Shot at Love (2008); That's Amore! (2008)

A Shot at Love with Tila Tequila is an American reality television dating game show similar to the TV show The Bachelor. It premiered on October 9, 2007 on MTV hosted by Tila Tequila. The series consists of a bisexual-themed reality dating show where 16 heterosexual men and 16 lesbian contestants live in Tequila's house and compete for her attention and affection. The contestants were not aware of Tequila's bisexuality until the end of the first episode, after ten contestants had been eliminated. The remaining contestants, both male and female, then shared the same home for the remainder of the series. A Shot at Love II premiered on April 22, 2008.

== Ratings ==
The show debuted at No. 1 in its time period across all of cable in the network's target demographic of persons 18–34, averaging a 2.0 rating. It became MTV's second highest-rated series premiere for the year, behind Life of Ryan (August 27, 2007) and tied with Newport Harbor: The Real Orange County (August 15, 2007).

The first season finale had 6.2 million viewers, which at the time was MTV's most watched series telecast.

== Criticism and controversy ==
The show was the subject of a heated online debate. An article critical of the show appeared on The Christian Post on September 13, 2007. Tequila wrote a response in her blog on September 28, 2007, criticizing churches for "bashing" the gay community while thanking God for saving her life. Criticism of the show has come from at least three conservative media organizations: Culture and Media Institute, Media Research Center and Parents Television Council, which named two episodes of the show the "Worst Cable Content of the Week".

Fox News and others stated that Tequila had a steady boyfriend and that the show was a sham, and that she is not bisexual. They cite New York Post's Page Six article. In 2007, Tequila responded to the claims made by Fox and denied them stating "I find it absolutely absurd that they would even make such an ignorant statement," but in 2018 (11 years later) she admitted that the Fox News report was true and that she indeed had a boyfriend while the show was being filmed and aired, stating that she was never actually gay or bisexual, and described her presence on the show as being "gay for pay".

On December 30, 2007, the winning contestant of the season, Bobby Banhart, posted a message on MySpace stating, "She never called me after the last show and no one would give me her number."

Tequila offered her own reasoning for why they broke up:

We couldn't see each other for 2 months after [the finale], and we only talked on the phone. Just naturally, people kind of move on with their lives. We tried our best to keep in touch and keep it going, but after a while, all of this camera stuff, he just couldn't handle it. [sic]

== Spin-offs, supplements, seasons 2 and 3 ==
- A Shot at Love: The Hangover is a supplementary show that shows clips and interviews guests as a recap to the show. It premiered on November 13, 2007 on MTV starring Ryan Stout. The show's debut averaged a 2.85 rating.
- A Shot at Love II with Tila Tequila – The second season premiered on April 22, 2008, and follows the same bisexual-bachelorette formula. The premiere date was announced on Tila Tequila's Spring Break Fantasy Couple. It is set in a Hollywood Hills mansion (the same one as the second season of Rock of Love with Bret Michaels). It was planned to be aired after That's Amore! Tequila announced at her Masquerade party, Tila Tequila's New Year's Eve Masquerade, that MTV greenlit her for a second season. During the Masquerade, she revealed that she and Bobby parted ways, which prompted suspicion that she would be the bachelorette during season two of A Shot at Love. News articles confirmed this.
- That's Amore! – Nesci's third spin-off featured former contestant Ashley as his consigliere. It premiered on MTV on March 2, 2008.
- A Double Shot at Love – A third season spin-off premiered on December 9, 2008, with the Ikki Twins replacing Tila Tequila as the host.
- Double Shot at Love (2019 TV series) – A fourth season Jersey Shore hybrid spinoff was announced for a 2019 premiere, with DJ Pauly D and Vinny Guadagnino as the hosts.

== Episodes ==
- Ep. 1 Surprise! I Like Boys and Girls (May The Best Sex Win-title on DVD and iTunes) (first aired October 9, 2007)
- Ep. 2 Can't We All Just Get Along? (Fight For Love-title on DVD and iTunes) (first aired October 16, 2007)
- Ep. 3 Under the Covers (first aired October 23, 2007)
- Ep. 4 A Broken Heart (first aired October 30, 2007)
- Ep. 5 I Always Get What I Want (first aired November 6, 2007)
- Ep. 6 The Cat Fight (first aired November 13, 2007)
- Ep. 7 A Second Chance? (first aired November 20, 2007)
- Ep. 8 Welcome To The Family (first aired November 27, 2007)
- Ep. 9 Three's A Crowd (first aired December 4, 2007)
- Special: One Shot Too Many (originally aired December 11, 2007)

In the week after Episode 9 aired and the week before Episode 10 aired, there was a special episode titled One Shot Too Many. Instead of being a regular episode, it was flashbacks and never before seen footage of events of the previous weeks of the show.

- Ep. 10 I Choose...(This Is Real-title on DVD and iTunes) (first aired December 18, 2007)
- Special: The Final Round (first aired December 23, 2007)

== Contestants ==
The following table lists the roster of contestants for each episode, ordered based on Tila's call-out order.

#	Contestants	Episodes									
#	Contestants	1	2	3	4	5	6	7	8	9	11
1	Alex	Alex	Alex	Ashli	Ryan	Dani	Amanda	Amanda	Bobby	Dani	Bobby
2	Amanda	Amanda	Amanda	Bobby	Amanda	Ryan	Bobby	Dani	Dani	Bobby	Dani
3	Ashley	Ashley	Ashley	Ryan	Ashli	Brandi	Ryan	Bobby	Amanda	Amanda	
4	Ashli	Ashli	Ashli	Amanda	Michael B.	Domenico	Dani	Ryan	Ryan		
5	Bennie	Bobby	Bobby	Vanessa	Domenico	Amanda	Domenico	Domenico			
6	Bobby	Brandi	Brandi	Dani	Brandi	Steven	Brandi				
7	Brandi	Dani	Dani	Ashley	Vanessa	Vanessa	Vanessa				
8	Brenda	Domenico	Domenico	Sara	Steven	Bobby	Steven				
9	Chaos	Eddie	Eric	Michael B.	Dani	Michael B.					
10	Dani	Eric	Krystal	Domenico	Bobby	Ashli					
11	Domenico	Grace	Michael B.	Steven	Ashley						
12	Eddie	Krystal	Rebecca	Brandi	Sara						
13	Ellie	Lala	Rob	Rebecca							
14	Eric	Marcus	Ryan	Eric							
15	Grace	Michael B.	Sara	Alex							
16	Greg	Rebecca	Steven	Krystal							
17	Keasha	Rob	Vanessa	Rob							
18	Krystal	Ryan	Marcus								
19	Lala	Sara	Steffanie								
20	Lance	Steven	Grace								
21	Marcus	Steffanie	Eddie								
22	Michael B.	Vanessa	Lala								
23	Michael R.	Keasha									
24	Rami	Brenda									
25	Rebecca	Chaos									
26	Rob	Ellie									
27	Ryan	Scout									
28	Sara	Greg									
29	Scout	Lance									
30	Steven	Michael R.									
31	Steffanie	Rami									
32	Vanessa	Bennie									

- Contestants surviving elimination in the first two episodes are arranged alphabetically, while eliminated contestants are arranged based on the order Tequila announced that their shot at love had ended.

The contestant was eliminated.
The contestant won a date with Tequila.
The contestant won a date with Tequila, but was eliminated.
The contestant left of his/her own accord.
The contestant won the competition.

=== Eliminations ===
The following table explains Tequila's reasons for asking each contestant to leave.

- Some reasons were not stated in the episode in which they aired.

Men
Name	Reason for elimination	Episode eliminated
Bennie	Cute, but not her type.	Episode 1
Rami	Could not remember him.	Episode 1
Michael R.	Reason not stated in episode.	Episode 1
Lance	Reason not stated in episode.	Episode 1
Greg	Too focused on sex; she was looking for more than that.	Episode 1
Eddie	Respects his virginity, but felt he is also too innocent.	Episode 2
Marcus	Connected at first, but caused too much drama.	Episode 2
Rob	Will make some woman happy someday, but not her.	Episode 3
Alex	Did not feel they had a connection.	Episode 3
Eric	Did not think they would make it as a couple.	Episode 3
Ashley McNealy	Seemingly fell in love with her too quickly; she felt something was not right about him.	Episode 4
Michael B.	Reason not stated in episode.	Episode 5
Steven	Connected more with the other people in the house than himself.	Episode 6
Domenico	Connected more with the other people in the house than himself, but credited him for his personality.	Episode 7
Ryan	Felt that his and her paths were too different, and that his family was too traditional and she could not fit into that lifestyle.	Episode 8
Women
Name	Reason for elimination	Episode eliminated
Scout	Did not remember her.	Episode 1
Ellie	Too shy.	Episode 1
Chaos	Did not connect with her.	Episode 1
Brenda	Reason not stated in episode.	Episode 1
Keasha	Felt that she is "a demolition project".	Episode 1
Lala	Did not like having men competing and being around them.	Episode 2
Steffanie	There for two days and still did not know her.	Episode 2
Grace	Did not feel they would be a good fit.	Episode 2
Krystal	Did not click with her.	Episode 3
Rebecca	Kissed Brandi while in the house and seems to have objections with monogamy.	Episode 3
Sara	Beautiful girl, but just did not have that connection she was looking for.	Episode 4
Ashli	Did not want to put her in a position where she felt uncomfortable.	Episode 5
Vanessa Romanelli	Reason not stated in episode. In the following episode, however, due to her physical attack on Brandi during eliminations in Episode 6, it was alluded that she was not the right person.	Episode 6
Brandi Ryan	Left on Episode 6 in the heat of the moment after Vanessa's attack. Came back on Episode 7. However, she was not accepted back into the house because of the feeling that her return would jeopardize the show's integrity for the other contestants and the fear that she would walk out on Tila again.	Episode 6/7
Amanda Ireton	Had a deeper connection with Bobby and Dani, or as Tila said, "There's no more keys left."	Episode 9
Dani	Mentioned loving Dani, but being in love with Bobby. Off screen, said she eliminated Dani to make sure their friendship "never ended" like dating show romances usually do.	Episode 10

=== Amanda Ireton ===
Among the contestants, the comedian and television personality Amanda Ellen Soloman Ireton after the show went on to appear on other MTV television shows Hang Over Show and That's Amore, WETV's Secret Lives of Women, CCTV's The Rack, and Entertainment Television's The Soup and Extra.

She hosted CBS's reality show Big Brother – The Reunion Special as an interviewer. She starred in Karmina's The Kiss music video. Furthermore Ireton was MTV's columnist and video blogger for A Shot at Love 2.

== DVD release ==
A Shot at Love with Tila Tequila – The Complete Uncensored First Season was released on April 15, 2008. The DVD contains the ten episodes, the reunion listed as episode 11, but does not contain the special episode "One Shot Too Many". It also includes some extended and deleted scenes.

== See also ==
- The Bachelorette (2003)
  - The Bachelorette (Australian TV series) season 7 - An Australian edition of The Bachelorette that was Bisexually oriented (much like A Shot at Love).
- I Love New York (2007)
- Transamerican Love Story (2008)
