= Welcome to the Dark Side =

Welcome to the Darkside

EP by Tila Tequila
- Released: May 11, 2010
- Recorded: 2009–10
- Genre: Pop; R&B
- Length: 13:38
- Label: Little Miss Trendsetter
- Producer: Tila Tequila (exec.); David Maurice

Tila Tequila chronology
| Sex (2007) | Welcome to the Darkside (2010) |

Welcome to the Darkside is the second studio EP by American recording artist Tila Tequila, released under the name Miss Tila. It was released on May 11, 2010 by her independent record label Little Miss Trendsetter. Originally intended to be a full-length album, Tequila first announced the project in May 2009. The album was to be a mix of hip hop and club music, as well as some softer pop rock songs. "I Fucked the DJ" was set to be the lead single with "Gold Digging Bitch" being the second single from the album. However, by the beginning of 2010, Tequila decided to reinvent her image including changing her stage name to Miss Tila. She released "I Fucked the DJ" as a stand-alone single and recorded songs with different sound.

Executive produced by Tequila, Welcome to the Darkside is a musical departure from her previous material. It has more R&B sound with blues and soul influences. Two covers appear on the EP, "Blue Dress" by Depeche Mode and "Walking on Thin Ice" by Yoko Ono, with "Get Me Off" being the only original song. Upon its release, Welcome to the Darkside received mixed reviews. While some praised Tequila's new softer image, others criticized her weak vocals.

"Walking on Thin Ice" was released as a single with an accompanying music video. Released on March 10, 2011, the main theme of the video is domestic violence.

== Track listing ==
| No. | Title | Writer(s) | Length |
|---|---|---|---|
| 1. | "Blue Dress" | Martin Gore | 4:29 |
| 2. | "Get Me Off" | Tila Tequila | 5:04 |
| 3. | "Walking on Thin Ice" | Yoko Ono | 4:05 |
| Total length: | | | 13:38 |
