= Masterminds (2013 film) =

- Directed by: David Keary
- Produced by: David Keary
- Starring: Tila Tequila; Nick Hogan; Tray Chaney
- Cinematography: Lou Chanatry
- Edited by: Carmel Juneau
- Music by: John Billings
- Distributed by: Green Apple Entertainment
- Release date: May 28, 2013
- Running time: 89 minutes
- Country: United States
- Language: English

Masterminds is a direct to DVD film starring Tila Tequila, Nick Hogan, and Tray Chaney directed by David Keary.

== Plot summary ==
When a businessman's plot to steal from criminals goes south, he learns that he stole from the wrong guy, and when a dangerous drug cartel shows up, all hell breaks loose. A businessman (Trey Chaney) uses his nightclub to target criminals for theft, but gets double crossed by his long-suffering girlfriend (Tila "Tequila" Nguyen) after using her as the bait.

== Cast ==
- Tila Tequila as Monae
- Nick Hogan as Jay White
- Tray Chaney as Rocket
