= Dani Campbell =

American reality show personality

Dani Campbell is an American reality show personality who became notable in the lesbian community as a symbol of self-assurance, causing Curve to call her "the first lesbian girl next door", and the Miami Herald to declare her South Florida's "most eligible lesbian". She was the runner-up in the first bisexual dating reality show A Shot at Love with Tila Tequila and the final female contestant. Most recently, she appeared in the third season of Kourtney and Kim Take Miami on the episode "Lez-B-Honest", which aired January 27, 2013.

Campbell is a firefighter/paramedic in Fort Lauderdale, Florida. During the show, she revealed that she came out as a lesbian to her mother at 16 years old. She also said she does not identify as either a butch or femme lesbian but as a cross between the two, in her words, "futch".

Following the airing of the show, she was considered a "celesbian" and developed a following of lesbians of all ages. During the airing of the show, she emerged as a fan favorite. MTV reported that Campbell was the most popular celebrity on one of its websites (iamonmtv.com), with 28,000 fans.

Campbell stated she was going to start a clothing line, called Futch Apparel, to cater to women like her who preferred gender-neutral or men's clothing in sizes appropriate for women. However, she instead operated a (now defunct) website called "Pink Boy Blue Girl" that sold only T-shirts and tank tops.

Campbell is a Democrat, endorsing Hillary Clinton in the 2016 presidential election.
