= I Love U (Tila Tequila song) =

Single by Tila Tequila
- Released: February 27, 2007
- Recorded: 2007
- Genre: Crunk; dirty rap
- Length: 3:28
- Label: StratArt
- Songwriter(s): Tila Tequila; Craig Love; Jonathan Smith
- Producer(s): Lil Jon

Tila Tequila singles chronology
"I Love U" (2007)	"Stripper Friends" (2007)

"I Love U" is a song recorded by American recording artist Tila Tequila. It was written by Tequila, Craig Love and Jonathan Smith. The song was first released on February 27, 2007, as a limited-time package deal: the track and an exclusive video for 99 cents on iTunes, and became the number one music video download. It was later released on March 13, 2007, by StratArt to other online music stores. Produced by Lil Jon, "I Love U" is a hip hop song with elements of crunk music. Lyrically, it is about a dominant female.

"I Love U" received mixed reviews from music critics. It failed to enter the Billboard Hot 100, but sold over 13,000 copies in its first week and peaked at number 75 on the Hot Digital Songs chart.

An accompanying music video was released on February 14, 2007. It first became available through Tequila's official website as a mobile download and later was released to other platforms. The song also became the theme track of Tequila's dating reality show, A Shot at Love with Tila Tequila.

== Background ==
Tequila came to prominence in the mid-2000s mainly due to her high presence on social networking website Myspace, where she would constantly share photos, videos and music with her fans. Around that time, she first pursued her singing career as the lead singer of rock bands Beyond Betty Jean and Jealousy. After becoming one of the most popular people on the website with over 1.5 million Myspace friends, Tequila decided to focus on her solo career and was ready to release her debut single. She was allegedly offered recording contracts from Jive and Interscope, but refused because she wanted to have full control over her projects. Tequila later commented: "I really wanted to become a pioneer and not fall into a category like everyone else, so I decided to take a gamble on myself. And if I win, I win big."

== Composition ==
'I Love U'
A 21-second sample of the track "I Love U" with Tequila's aggressive vocals over crunk beat.

"I Love U" is a song which runs for a duration of three minutes and 28 seconds. It is set in the simple time signature of 4/4, with a tempo of 105 beats per minute. The song starts with a spoken introduction where Tequila says "I think I love you, but if you ever hurt me I'll fucking kill you," and then transitions into a crunk beat which is built around a repetitive electric guitar riff and uses strong elements of hip hop music such as 808 bass, claps and hi-hats. Lyrically, the song is about a dominant female. In the chorus, Tequila sings "You better go down when you get with me / You better realize that I'm what you need / You better get here before I count to three / You better do right, I'll fuck you up".

== Track listings and formats ==
- Digital download (Explicit)
1. "I Love U" – 3:32
- Digital download (Clean)
1. "I Love U" – 3:28
- Digital download (Don Diablo Remixes)
1. "I Love U" (Dirty Version) – 3:32
2. "I Love U" (Don Diablo Remix) – 3:46
3. "I Love U" (Don Diablo's Out in the Country Remix) – 3:18

== Credits and personnel ==
Personnel

- Tila Tequila – vocals, songwriter
- Craig Love – songwriter
- Lil Jon – songwriter, producer

== Charts ==
Chart (2007)	Peak; position
US Hot Digital Songs (Billboard)	75

== Release history ==
Country	Date	Format	Label	Ref.
United States	February 27, 2007	Digital download	StratArt	
Worldwide	March 13, 2007	Digital download	StratArt	
Worldwide	April 7, 2009	Digital download (Don Diablo Remixes)	StratArt	
