= SallyAnn Salsano =

American television producer

SallyAnn Salsano (born c. 1974) is an American television producer. Her company 495 Productions has produced several television reality shows for MTV and syndication, including Jersey Shore and The Real.

== Early life and education ==
Salsano was raised in Farmingdale, New York, on Long Island, and graduated from Farmingdale High School in 1992. She attended the University of Missouri, graduating in 1995 with a degree in accounting.

== Career ==
Salsano began her career as an intern for TV and radio personalities Howard Stern and Sally Jessy Raphael. In 1996, she was a finalist for MTV's The Real World: Miami. After she was not cast as a reality show cast member, she then translated her internships into work in various producer capacities on The Bachelor, The Bachelorette, Trista & Ryan's Wedding, Extreme Makeover: Wedding Edition, and Surprise Weddings I & II.

In 2006, she launched 495 Productions, which is based in Burbank, California. It produces several television reality shows for MTV, including Jersey Shore. She named her company for Interstate 495, also known as the Long Island Expressway, on Long Island.

In 2011, Salsano said, "I'm an Italian girl from Long Island, my dad worked in sanitation, both of my parents drive Cadillacs, my dad wears a diamond-encrusted New York Yankees symbol around his neck. It doesn't get more guido than in my house."

She said that she spent several summers at the Jersey Shore growing up; "I was Snooki. I woke up and was like, 'Oh, that was a crazy night.' That's what you do."

== Productions ==
- All Star Shore (2022–2023)
- Buckhead Shore (2022)
- Joe Millionaire: For Richer or Poorer (2022)
- Paradise Hotel (2019)
- Jersey Shore Family Vacation (2018–present)
- Winter Break: Hunter Mountain (2018)
- Floribama Shore (2017–2021)
- Martha & Snoop's Potluck Dinner Party (2016–2020)
- Blue Collar Millionaires (2015)
- Party Down South 2 (2014–2015)
- Party Down South (2014–2016)
- Jerks with Cameras (2014)
- Fangasm (2014)
- Tattoos After Dark (2014)
- The Real (2013–2016)
- Snooki & JWoww (2012–2015)
- Tattoo Nightmares (2012–2015)
- Tanisha Gets Married (2012)
- Mama Drama (2012)
- Friendzone (2011–2014)
- Repo Games (2011–2012)
- The Nail Files (2011–2012)
- Love Handles: Couples in Crisis (2011)
- Jersey Shore (2009–2012)
- My Big Friggin' Wedding (2010)
- Tool Academy (2009–2010)
- Disaster Date (2009–2011)
- More to Love (2009)
- HGTV Design Star (2006–2009)
- The Antonio Project (2009) (which became The Antonio Treatment under a different producer)
- Dance Your Ass Off (2009)
- HGTV $250,000 Challenge (2009)
- A Double Shot at Love (2008–2009)
- Nashville Star (2008)
- A Shot at Love II with Tila Tequila (2008)
- That's Amore! (2008)
- A Shot at Love with Tila Tequila (2007)
- The Big Party Plan Off (2007–2008)
- More Amore (2008)
- Making of an HGTV Design Star (2006)
- Secret Life of a Soccer Mom (2006)
