= List of Jersey Shore episodes =

Jersey Shore is an American reality television series that ran on MTV from December 3, 2009, to December 20, 2012, in the United States. The series follows the lives of eight housemates: Jenni Farley, Michael "The Situation" Sorrentino, Nicole "Snooki" Polizzi, Paul "Pauly D" DelVecchio, Ronnie Ortiz-Magro, Sammi Giancola, Vinny Guadagnino, Deena Nicole Cortese (seasons 3–6), and Angelina Pivarnick (seasons 1–2).

The first season had five special episodes, with some airing after select episodes. Several after-hours specials have aired on MTV following select episodes along with various specials. The end of each season has been accompanied by a reunion show. Also a number of after-show internet specials titled "Jersey Shore: Hook-Up" hosted by Kenny Santucci have been released on MTV.com after select episodes. Additionally, there have been a number of internet specials exclusively on MTV.com.

== Series overview ==
Season	Episodes	Originally released	
Season	Episodes	First released	Last released
1	9	December 3, 2009	January 21, 2010
2	13	July 29, 2010	October 21, 2010
3	13	January 6, 2011	March 24, 2011
4	12	August 4, 2011	October 20, 2011
5	11	January 5, 2012	March 15, 2012
6	13	October 4, 2012	December 20, 2012

== Episodes ==
=== Season 1 (2009–10) ===
For the first quarter of 2010, season 1 of Jersey Shore was the highest-rated original cable series among 12- to 34-year-olds, with a season-high 2.6 rating for the finale. The season also ranked #1 for its time period versus all cable competition among 12- to 34-year-olds. The season finale was MTV's highest-rated original series telecast in almost two years. Overall, the season averaged 2.7 million viewers. The season featured five special episodes, including a half-hour show titled Jersey Shore: After Hours hosted by Julissa Bermudez which aired occasionally after select episodes featuring cast members discussing the week's episode.

No. overall	No. in season	Title	Original release date	U.S. viewers (millions)
1	1	"A New Family"	December 3, 2009^{[a]}	1.38
Summer at the Jersey Shore kicks off when eight soon-to-be roommates move into their summer share. Romance heats up between Sammi and Mike, but all might be lost when the guys invite three random girls to join them in the hot tub. Meanwhile, Snooki comes on way too strong, and finds herself the outcast. She can only hope that first impressions won't be lasting impressions.
2	2	"The Tanned Triangle"	December 3, 2009^{[a]}	1.38
Still feeling like the outcast, Snooki tells the others that she's leaving the Shore. And the roommates' first night out at the club gets flirty, proving that the boyfriends back home might, in fact, have something to worry about. And what started with Mike and Sammi turns into a love triangle that threatens to divide the house.
3	3	"Good Riddance"	December 10, 2009	2.12
The love triangle gets even more intense when Ronnie catches Sammi giving her number to another guy. And a housemate chooses to leave the Shore for good. Note: Angelina voluntarily leaves the house.
4	4	"Fade To Black"	December 17, 2009	2.48
After a night out at the club, Pauly D and Mike have to juggle multiple groups of girls. And mayhem breaks out when a fight erupts at a bar, and one of the housemates goes down.
5	5	"Just Another Day at the Shore"	December 31, 2009	N/A
The roommates rally around Snooki, and the unexpected result of the brutal punch is that it actually brings the house closer. Sam meets Ronnie's parents.
6	6	"Boardwalk Blowups"	January 7, 2010	3.27
When Mike invites girls back to the house, the situation gets out of control, and Snooki gets into her second fight of the summer. Meanwhile, Ronnie gets into a brawl of his own, leaving Sammi questioning their relationship.
7	7	"What Happens in AC"	January 14, 2010^{[b]}	3.60
The roommates head to Atlantic City where fun turns to fury when Mike manages to antagonize both Snooki and J-WOWW. One roommate reveals that she used to have an eating disorder.
8	8	"One Shot"	January 14, 2010^{[b]}	3.60
The summer's winding down, but the drama doesn't stop. Pauly has a stalker and a fight lands another roommate in jail.
9	9	"That's How The Shore Goes"	January 21, 2010	4.83
Ronnie is released from his night in the slammer and the guys comfort Snooki after she has a bad encounter with her ex-boyfriend. The housemates wrap things up at the Shore as summer draws to a close, but not before one final house hot tub hook up.

^{^[a]} Episodes 1.01 and 1.02 premiered back-to-back.
^{^[b]} Episodes 1.07 and 1.08 aired back-to-back.

Title	Episode Shown After	Host	Original air date
Jersey Shore: After Hours	3	Julissa Bermudez	December 10, 2009
Things get heated when Angelina, Mike and Sammi stop by to discuss all the happenings in this week's episode.
Jersey Shore: After Hours	6	Julissa Bermudez	January 7, 2010
Snooki, Ronnie and The Situation discuss the happenings in this week's episode.
Jersey Shore: Spoof'd	-	Cast	January 16, 2010
A half-hour special titled Jersey Shore: Spoof'd aired on January 16, 2010, featuring the original cast audition tapes and cast commentary highlighting internet and television spoofs that have sprung up as a direct response to the show.
Jersey Shore: Reunion	9	Julissa Bermudez	January 21, 2010
Questions are answered when Snooki, The Situation, J-WOWW, DJ Pauly D, Angelina, Ronnie, Sammi and Vinny return for more fights and insight into what truly happened down at the Jersey Shore. Viewers: 4.0 million
Jersey Shore: Before The Shore	-	Julissa Bermudez	January 28, 2010
In this special episode watch never-before-seen footage of the cast before they leave for the Jersey Shore house.

=== Season 2 (2010) ===
On January 29, 2010, MTV announced that a second season of the series consisting of 13 episodes had been ordered and would air in Summer 2010. MTV announced that the second season would follow all of the first-season cast as they "escape the cold northeast and find themselves in a new destination". The second season was shot in the South Beach neighborhood of Miami Beach, Florida, from early March to late May 2010. The second season began on July 29, 2010. For Season 2, the After Hours specials were expanded to one hour and received Top 15 Weekly Cable ratings. Like season 1, this season featured special episodes titled Jersey Shore: Hook-Up. Like Season 1's episodes, these are hosted by Kenny Santucci from the Real World/Road Rules Challenge: Fresh Meat and shown on MTV.com.

No. overall	No. in season	Title	Original release date	U.S. viewers (millions)
10	1	"Goin' South"	July 29, 2010	5.25
Tired of the effects Snowmageddon, the now famous Jersey shore crew head down south to Miami. However, drama quickly picks up where it left off last summer when Angelina unexpectedly arrives. Tension between Ronnie and Sammi reach an all time high.
11	2	"The Hangover"	August 5, 2010	5.03
Sammi tries to figure out what Ronnie really did at the club the night before, but no one is saying. And when Angelina interrupts Pauly's game, we see a whole new side of the usually calm Pauly D.
12	3	"Creepin'"	August 12, 2010	5.51
Angelina swallows her pride and apologizes to the girls. Back at the house, The Situation, Vinny and Pauly D have a close encounter with grenades in the hot tub, while Ronnie continues to creep behind Sammi's back.
13	4	"Breaking Up"	August 19, 2010	5.50
Ronnie's bad behavior puts Snooki, Angelina and JWoww in a tough spot. Together the girls decide to write an "anonymous" letter to Sammi that reveals the entire truth.
14	5	"The Letter"	August 26, 2010	5.82
Sammi finds Snooki and Jenni's "anonymous" letter, and this time it's really over with Ronnie -- at least for now. Meanwhile, Mike, Vinny and Pauly ("MVP") have their hands full juggling four girls in one night.
15	6	"Not So Shore"	September 2, 2010	6.54
The anonymous note causes tension between the girls, culminating in a full-blown cat fight. After spending another night in bed with Vinny, Snooki reveals a not-so-little known fact about her pinkeye-prone cuddle buddy.
16	7	"Sleeping with the Enemy"	September 9, 2010	6.38
The roommates deal with fallout from the girls' fight; Angelina starts dating Jose, a guy from the club; and Jenni and Snooki don homemade HazMat suits to clean up the Smush Room in preparation for Snooki's hook-up.
17	8	"All in the Family"	September 12, 2010^{[c]}	5.71^{[d]}
When news gets out that Angelina and Vinny hooked up, Mike threatens to tell Jose. Vinny's family comes to visit, and Vinny and Pauly find the girls of their dreams, but one of their hearts will be broken.
18	9	"Dirty Pad"	September 23, 2010	5.95
Things go south for Angelina when the roommates learn that she slept with Jose after smushing Vinny. Then she gets too close to a guy Snooki hooked up with. But it's the last straw when The Situation discovers more unpleasantness in the bathroom.
19	10	"Gone, Baby, Gone"	September 30, 2010	6.72
The Situation reunites with his Canadian hottie, providing entertainment for the whole house. And Angelina tells her roommates how she really feels about them, sending Snooki into a frenzy. Note: Angelina voluntarily leaves the house and the series.
20	11	"Girls Like That"	October 7, 2010	5.35
Vinny decides between two sets of girls. Meanwhile, with Angelina gone, Snooki thinks it's time that she and JWoww bury the hatchet with Sammi. But Snooki's happiness is short-lived as The Situation becomes increasingly belligerent with her.
21	12	"Deja Vu All Over Again"	October 14, 2010	5.68
Everyone is frustrated with The Situation for being off his game -- he gets the roommates kicked out of a club, gets the car towed, practically burns down the house, and proves to be a failure as a wingman for Pauly D. Twice!
22	13	"Back Into The Fold"	October 21, 2010	6.07
Pauly D and Vinny each have a final date with their Miami girls, while Sammi and Ronnie's last supper quickly devolves into a fight. Then JWoww stirs things up between Pauly D and The Situation, leading to a drama-filled final night in the hot tub.

^{^[c]}Aired on a Sunday night at 7 p.m. ET before the 2010 MTV Video Music Awards.
^{^[d]}MTV did not re-air the episode on TV or online after the initial showing until its usual time-slot the following Thursday September 16, 2010. Upon re-airing, the episode received 3.75 million viewers.

Title	Episode Shown After	Host	Original air date
Jersey Shore: After Hours	6	Julissa Bermudez	September 2, 2010
Ronnie, Sammi, Snooki, and JWoww talk about the drama that went down on Episode 6. Viewers: 4.36 million
Jersey Shore: After Hours	10	Julissa Bermudez	September 30, 2010
Angelina may have left Miami, but that does not mean she's off the hook. Watch her former housemates confront her on 'Jersey shore After Hours'. Viewers: 4.68 million
Jersey Shore: Reunion	-	Julissa Bermudez	October 28, 2010
The cast of 'Jersey Shore' (except Angelina) is back together to dish the dirt on Miami. From bromances and romances to the infamous note and the fights that followed, the cast tells all. Viewers: 3.34 million

=== Season 3 (2011) ===
Season 3 was shot back in Seaside Heights, New Jersey, over the summer; filming began on July 25, 2010, and ended on September 4, 2010. On July 20, 2010, MTV announced that the entire cast will return for the third season, with the exception of Angelina Pivarnick. Angelina was replaced by Deena Nicole Cortese, a longtime friend of Nicole "Snooki" Polizzi and a self-described "blast in a glass".

Although the season is widely reported and regarded as the third season of the show, MTV refers to it as a continuation of season 2 on their website. Season three premiered on January 6, 2011, to 8.45 million viewers, making it MTV's highest-rated telecast. The second episode of the season once again set a series and MTV high, with 8.56 million viewers, only to set another record with the airing of the fourth episode, which garnered 8.87 million viewers.

No. overall	No. in season	Title	Original release date	U.S. viewers (millions)
23	1	"Back to the Shore"	January 6, 2011	8.45
New roommate Deena moves into the house and is welcomed by some of the roommates. The house gets off to an interesting start when Snooki confronts Vinny about him and her best friend Ryder and Deena "accidentally" gets naked in front of Mike. Leftover tension from Miami spills over to Seaside Heights when new girl Deena gets into a heated argument with Sammi which leads to a fist fight between Sammi and Jenni ending in a cliffhanger. Note: Deena enters the series.
24	2	"It's Gonna Be An Interesting Summer"	January 13, 2011	8.56
The fight between Sammi and JWoww causes additional tension in the house. Ronnie and Sammi continue to isolate themselves, missing the first family dinner, to the surprise and disappointment of all the roommates. Mike lets Ronnie know about the general feeling at the house. Ronnie decides to hang out and have fun with the rest of the house, leaving Sammi feeling all alone and reminiscent of Miami.
25	3	"Where's the Beach?"	January 17, 2011^{[e]}	7.70
Sammi sets out to make amends with Snooki and Deena. A night in the club turns romantic for Jenni when she runs into an old flame named Roger, who may or may not have a girlfriend. Deena gets kicked out within the first five minutes for being too drunk. Mike meets one of the girls he hooked up with last year named Paula and Pauly's stalker returns and throws a drink at him. The next day Snooki is extremely hung over and has to go to work. After sneaking a couple of drinks she runs off drinking more and more. After a huge crowd appears to watch her creating a scene Snooki is arrested.
26	4	"Free Snooki"	January 20, 2011	8.87
Snooki is released from jail but faces her father's voice on the phone which is not happy. Jenni continues to meet with Roger and quickly grows feelings for him. Tom continues to call the house and cause problems with Jenni escalating into a heated argument on the phone and a destroyed relationship. Snooki is lifted from her depressed state after she meets Nick who she hooks up with. Deena meets a Ronnie look-alike only to find out that he has a girlfriend. Later, Jenni has to return to her home because Tom left, leaving her dogs at home alone. She and Snooki leave the Shore and reach home within 9 hours to find her dogs safe, but a number of her most important items, including a hard drive, have been stolen.
27	5	"Drunk Punch Love"	January 27, 2011	8.83
Snooki's friend Ryder stops by for a visit and lucky enough it's her birthday. Snooki and Jenni return to Jersey with Jenni's dogs who are welcomed at the house by everyone. Sammi and Ronnie's relationship continues to strain and after a heated argument after the club, Ronnie throws all her stuff around the room and tells her to leave. Ronnie starts to second guess himself. Jenni comforts him and they bury the hatchet from Miami. Mike brings home a girl, but her friend is wandering down the house so Vinny pulls out the Grenade Whistle to warn Mike. Vinny's girl's family comes to pick her up which makes Vinny uncomfortable. Jenni gives Ronnie a hug which is caught by Sammi. Sammi loses it and thinks she is all alone in the shore house. As a response to the newfound friendship between Ronnie and Jenni, she punches Ronnie in the face. She quickly plans to leave but with the help of everyone she apologizes to Ronnie and stays. Jenni and Roger continue to date and also Deena and Dean, but Mike finds out a dirty secret which ends their relationship. Also Snooki and Vinny buy a stripper pole for the house and Sammi and Jenni make up and become friends again.
28	6	"Should We Just Break Up?"	February 3, 2011	8.26
Now that Sammi and JWoww are friends again everyone is all about having a good time. Ronnie's drinking gets serious when he has to take a painful trip to the doctors. Deena hooks up with one of Ronnie's friends after a night in the club. Snooki also meets a guy and hooks up with him but after a romantic date on the boardwalk, he reveals that he was kind of engaged. Snooki immediately breaks up with him and he continues to call the house forcing Pauly D to hang up on him pretending to be an operator. Sammi and Ronnie's relationship continues to crumble especially when Sammi starts to hang around the girls more. Pauly has an encounter with his stalker but they make peace. In the end, Ronnie and Sammi get into a heated argument which ends with them ultimately breaking up.
29	7	"Cabs Are Here!"	February 10, 2011	7.85
Despite Ronnie and Sammi's break up, their arguing is causing problems in the house. Ronnie confronts Mike about Miami which ends up into a heated argument in the kitchen but Mike ultimately apologizes to Ron to calm him down. JWoww goes on a date with Roger but keeps getting interrupted by his friends. Shortly after, the girls convince Sammi to go out and take a break from the tension between her and Ronnie but when Ronnie finds out he gets mad and starts to wreck their room and throwing Sammi's belongings onto the porch, including the bed on which she was standing. The roommates hear the ruckus and realize that this was not just an argument but a physical altercation between Sam and Ron. Sammi goes on a rampage throwing fists, threatening and breaking the door and blinds. Ronnie also has to get held back. Sammi immediately goes out with the girls and starts to make Ronnie jealous by dancing with another guy. Ronnie leaves the club and returns home only to destroy all of Sammi's belongings. He breaks down crying and when Sammi returns home she sees the mess and also breaks down realizing that she does not deserve this. She calls a cab, says goodbye to everyone and leaves the Shore. Note: Sammi voluntarily leaves the house.
30	8	"The Great Depression"	February 17, 2011	7.64
After Sammi leaves the house, Ronnie is an emotional wreck. With the girls taking Sammi's side and the guys not knowing how to cheer him up, Ronnie feels like he has no friends left in the house. Meanwhile, The Situation tries to hook up with Pauly D's ex-girlfriend. Also, the crew makes fun of Deena because of her "situation" and she ultimately has a nervous breakdown after the club and becomes upset because of their constant putdowns toward her. Ronnie then has a heart-to-heart talk with her and convinces her to not leave. Ronnie then wonders if he should stay in Jersey also, until Deena convinces him to stay.
31	9	"Kissing Cousins"	February 24, 2011	7.73
Snooki realizes thanks to Jenni that her two previous hookups are actually related. Ronnie contemplates again on leaving but he calls his dad to help him out before he realizes that wherever he goes, he will continue to feel crappy. Mike becomes annoyed by Snooki and Deena to the point where he sets up a prank that sends the duo to Times Square. Despite pulling off the best prank yet, he gets left behind by the boys after taking a long time getting ready. The girls return and make Mike feel as if his prank did not work. In the end, the group gets ready to go out until Sammi makes her return to the shore.
32	10	"A Cheesy Situation"	March 3, 2011	7.77
Ronnie is shocked to see Sammi return. At the club, he tries to get back on her good side but she gives him the cold shoulder for now. Snooki tells Sam that she has feelings for Vinny but is heartbroken when she finds him "smushing" a girl he brought home from the club. The gang goes out bowling and realize Deena is a bad driver and Sammi and Jenni try to get Vinny to talk to Snooki about her feelings and their relationship. Then the roommates finally cannot stand the clogged toilet and decide to call a plumber who finds a tank top in the toilet. Ronnie, Sam, and Snooki play a prank on Mike by covering his bed with grated cheese that causes him to believe the girl he brought home has a yeast infection and Vinny and Snooki finally talk about their relationship. Note: Sammi returns to the house.
33	11	"Gym, Tan, Find Out Who Sammi Is Texting"	March 10, 2011	7.20
Vinny and Pauly head to Staten Island to visit Vinny's family. Deena, Jenni, Snooki, Ronnie and Sammi head out for a "Female GTL" of manicures and pedicures and Mike gets left behind, again. Ronnie and Sam rekindle their relationship by kissing where she then felt confused on the matter. Later, Jenni, Ronnie, Sammi and Vinny go tanning where Vinny gets a spray tan. While driving back to the house, Jenni apparently sees her friend Roger driving with another woman and she leaves him an angry message on his phone. The roommates do some investigating and realize she has made a mistake. Ronnie, Vinny and Pauly play with kites and Sammi, Snooki, and Deena decide to "bomb" the boys with water balloons where the boys retaliate. Roger calls and gets angry with Jenni for not trusting him and misinterpreting his actions. Ronnie and Sam try to work out their relationship but she does not feel ready yet. Then the gang hits the club where Mike meets an old friend named Arvin who was there to meet Sam. He shows Mike texts between him and Sam. Mike shows the rest of the group the same conversation to show he was not starting drama. Snooki and Deena confront Sammi about the texts but she denies it. Ronnie and Sam confront Mike and Arvin about the texts where Ronnie gets mad about the matter. In the end, Sam gets mad at Mike for being shady and Ronnie backs up Mike. Ron and Sam fight over what happened between Arvin and herself.
34	12	"A House Divided"	March 17, 2011	6.60
Vinny treats Snooki to burgers; however, to Snooki's dismay, Vinny uses their tete-a-tete as a venue for discussing his sexual exploits from the night before. Shortly thereafter, Vinny undergoes an anxiety-ridden ear piercing at the T-shirt shop, and Pauly announces that Vinny looks "fresh to death" (the onlookers ostensibly concur). That night, after Pauly and the newly bejeweled Vinny heckle Deena for her denim-heavy attire, the crew ventures to Aztec. Meanwhile, Sam and Ronnie remain at home. Sam apologizes for having texted Arvin and insists that their relationship is platonic; Ronnie accepts, and the two sleep together. Some time later, Pauly and Vinny reluctantly return from the club with a suboptimal selection of females. Vinny, pierced and assertive, eventually evicts the girls and attempts to drag Snooki across the floor to his bedroom, aggravating her and their inchoate romance. The next morning, Ronnie's mother calls the house and, thoroughly intoxicated, complains to Mike about her lack of trust in Ron's girlfriend. After Ron returns home, Mike suggests to him that Sam's relationship with Arvin is suspicious. But Sam interrupts their summit, and the house quickly divides along gender lines. As the episode ends, Ronnie discovers from Arvin himself that Sam has lied about the nature of her relationship. He storms out to confront the lover who, he proclaims, is "the biggest liar in the world."
35	13	"At the End of the Day"	March 24, 2011	7.61
After Ronnie calls Arvin (to find out that Sammi has been cheating on Ronnie with Arvin) an angry Ronnie confronts Sam. She goes to the phone and confronts Arvin, who says they did kiss, but she says they didn't. After a heated argument, Ronnie angrily hangs up the phone, leaving Ronnie "feeling like a fool." Sammi confesses that a few years ago she did hook up with Arvin, and apologizes, but Ronnie leaves her by herself anyway. Ron, Snooki, and Vinny are working on the last day, but Ronnie decides to "sleep" on the job, only for Danny to spill water on him. The gang get ready for a night at the shore store where Danny is barbecuing. There, they meet up with friends and family, such as JWoww's dad, Snooki's friend, Danielle, and Pauly's friends from home, (Biggie and Jerry), as well as Roger and Deena's friend Lisa and her uncle. Pauly DJs while Vinny wants to hook up with Lisa, but Deena becomes stubborn and takes Lisa away from Vinny. Deena and Vinny argue, as Vinny calls her "Angelina" starting some drama between them. Mike apologizes for being nosy to Sammi, and she accepts wondering why he was so nosy. The guys hit it up at Karma, where Roger and JWoww become a couple. Snooki hooks up with Nick one last time; Ron and Sam get into a new fight for the summer to everyone's unpleasantness. Ronnie and Sammi question whether they will get back together or not, leading to them just staying friends--for now. The guys prepare to leave, while Ron regrets ever dating Sammi. They all say their goodbyes and leave the Shore again.

^{^[e]}Episode aired on a Monday night at 9 p.m. ET before the series premiere of Skins.

Title	Episode Shown After	Host	Original air date
Jersey Shore: After Hours	4	Julissa Bermudez	January 20, 2011
JWoww, Snooki and Deena talked about what happened on Episode 3 and 4; JWOWW opens up about her relationship with Tom. Viewers: 4.77 million
Jersey Shore: After Hours	7	Julissa Bermudez	February 10, 2011
Ronnie is joined by JWoww, Mike, Vinny, and Pauly discuss Sammi's departure, grenades and Pauly D's stalker. Viewers: 5.44 million
Jersey Shore: After Hours	10	Julissa Bermudez	March 3, 2011
Snooki, Mike 'The Situation', Vinny and Deena discuss the toilet situation, Snooki and Vinny's "relationship", Mike pranking Deena and Snooki in Episode 9 and Snooki, Sam, and Ronnie pranking Mike in Episode 10. Viewers: 4.0 million

=== Season 4 (2011) ===
MTV renewed Jersey Shore for a fourth season on January 24, 2011. It was the first to be shot overseas, this time following the cast in Florence, Italy. Filming went from May to June 20, 2011 and the fourth season premiered on August 4, 2011. The fourth season aired for 12 episodes and finished airing on October 20, 2011.

No. overall	No. in season	Title	Original release date	U.S. viewers (millions)
36	1	"Going To Italia"	August 4, 2011	8.78
The Jersey Shore cast reunite and head off to Florence, Italy. While there the cast stay in a converted town house. Mike expresses interest in Snooki, but she has a boyfriend back home. Things are awkward between Ronnie and Sam after they ended their turbulent relationship. While trying to find somewhere to eat the girls get lost, whereas the boys find their way to a pizzeria and then the gym. Mike tells Ron that while they weren't filming he and Snooki slept together, more than once. The cast then go out to a club called Otel, Mike tries to kiss Snooki and she declines. Deena then openly kisses Pauly.
37	2	"Like More Than a Friend"	August 11, 2011	7.37
Exes Ron and Sammi try to work on their relationship. Mike tried taking his friendship with Snooki to the next level and the gang learns they'll be working at a pizzeria.
38	3	"Twinning"	August 18, 2011	7.79
Deena pulls a "robbery" on both Mike and Vinny with a pair of female twins: Mike tells everyone he hooked up with Snooki; Ron and Sammi talk things out and get back together.
39	4	"Crime and Punishment"	August 25, 2011	8.47
The guys harass Deena for pulling a robbery on them; Ron and Sammi are back to their old ways and this time Mike gets involved in their drama.
40	5	"And The Wall Won"	August 28, 2011	8.08
Mike and Ronnie come to blows over Mike's meddling ways, and Mike leaves the house on a stretcher due to hitting his own head on the concrete wall. Neither party hurt each other during the fight. Ronnie and Sam break up again, and Ronnie decides not to bring a girl home from the club that night. On the way home from the club, Ronnie buys Sam a rose. Meanwhile back in the house, Sam is not fully sure if he brought home a girl or not.
41	6	"Fist Pump, Push-Ups, Chapstick"	September 8, 2011	6.81
Pauly and Vinny put on a "guido-theme" comedy show; Snooki becomes so distraught over her relationship woes that the girls decide to intervene; Ron and Sam try to patch things up once again.
42	7	"Meatball Mashup"	September 15, 2011	6.97
The gang hits the beach during a trip to the Italian coast. Later, when they get back to Florence, Snooki and Deena have a run-in with the police.
43	8	"Where Is My Boyfriend?"	September 22, 2011	6.49
Snooki and Deena are released from the police station after their accident. Later, Snooki's boyfriend Jionni visits, but their romantic reunion comes to an abrupt halt, and a sobbing Snooki ends the night alone on the streets of Florence.
44	9	"Three Men and a Snooki"	September 29, 2011	7.06
Snooki is devastated over her big fight with Jionni, and decides to take a break from the relationship. Mike thinks it's finally his chance to win her over, but it's someone else who ends up comforting her. Meanwhile, Deena has a pregnancy scare.
45	10	"Damage Is Done"	October 6, 2011	6.59
The boys visit Vinny's family in Sicily, while the girls head to Tuscany for a wine tour. Later, Snooki learns the truth about her and Vinny's hookup, and she decides to come clean to Jionni.
46	11	"Situation Problems"	October 13, 2011	6.472
Deena continues to pursue Pauly. Later, she and Snooki get an icy reception at a nightclub. Meanwhile, Mike is back to stirring up drama, prompting the whole house to turn on him.
47	12	"Ciao, Italia"	October 20, 2011	6.63
The gang gets ready to say good-bye to Italy and head back to Seaside Heights in the Season 4 finale, but tensions between Mike and the rest of the roommates leave him doubtful that he'll be joining them back at the Jersey Shore.

Title	Episode Shown After	Host	Original air date
Jersey Shore: From the First Fist Pump			July 28, 2011
Jersey Shore: After Hours	5	Amy Paffrath	September 1, 2011
Ronnie, The Situation, Vinny, Sammi, and Deena stop by to discuss the fight between Ronnie and The Situation, Deena's surprise hookup with Pauly D, and Deena pulling the "robbery" on Vinny and The Situation.
Jersey Shore: After Hours	7	Amy Paffrath	September 15, 2011
Snooki, J-WOWW, Deena, and The Situation stop by to discuss The Situation and Snooki's alleged hookup.
Jersey Shore: Reunion	12	Amy Paffrath	October 20, 2011
The cast of 'Jersey Shore' is back together to dish on the dirt that happened in Italy. From the smooshing and romances to the fight and the Deena hookup, the cast tells all.

=== Season 5 (2012) ===
Jersey Shore was renewed for a fifth season. Filming started a week after returning from Italy on June 27, 2011, to August 1, 2011. It premiered on January 5, 2012, and follows the cast returning to Seaside Heights, New Jersey, after spending the fourth season in Italy.

No. overall	No. in season	Title	Original release date	U.S. viewers (millions)
48	1	"Hurricane Situation"	January 5, 2012	7.60
The roommates return from Italy and couldn't be more excited to get back to the Jersey Shore. But a drama storm is brewing as The Situation threatens to destroy Snooki's relationship with Jionni. Snooki gets into a screaming match with "The Unit" and leaves everyone questioning the rumor of her and Mike.
49	2	"One Man Down"	January 12, 2012	6.49
Vinny weighs his options: Should he stay at the Jersey Shore house or head home to Staten Island? Snooki fights with Jionni, and the roommates are back to their usual antics- partying and tanning to the extreme. Vinny ultimately leaves the house. Note: Vinny voluntarily leaves the house.
50	3	"Dropping Like Flies"	January 19, 2012	6.16
The roommates struggle to adjust to life at the shore without Vinny, while The Situation confronts his own internal demons. But it's also Pauly D's birthday -- and he gets the best present of his life! Mike deals with jealousy and storms out of the house. Note: Mike voluntarily leaves the house.
51	4	"Free Vinny"	January 26, 2012	6.53
The Situation returns only to find out that Danny has threatened to get new roommates. The girls hire strippers for Pauly D and The Situation's wild birthday party. The night out turns ugly when Sammi gets into a huge bar fight. The cast then goes to Staten Island to get back Vinny. Note: Mike returns to the house.
52	5	"Nothing But Nice"	February 2, 2012	5.69
Vinny returns and everyone celebrates. The Situation tries hard to be nice but ends up annoying the boys. Snooki struggles with an uncomfortable condition. Note: Vinny returns to the house.
53	6	"The Follow Game"	February 9, 2012	5.42
The Situation secretly gathers information to bring down one of his roommates -- and for once it isn't Snooki. JWoww's relationship with her boyfriend starts to fall apart when she questions his priorities, and Pauly D discovers he has a new stalker.
54	7	"Love at the Jersey Shore"	February 16, 2012	5.35
All of the roommates are focused on courting their current flames, but there is never peace in the house. One of the roommates causes drama with Snooki and Deena, while JWoww's skimpy outfit creates a problem for Roger. Everyone goes to Karma and the club is going crazy with fights and other chaos. The roommates prepare to fight if they have to but when someone touches JWoww the wrong way, Roger snaps and fights the guy.
55	8	"Sharp Objects"	February 23, 2012	5.23
Mike prepares to confront Jionni; Deena and Snooki go fishing on a boat, and try to survive a near-death experience by a shark attack; Snooki buys a mini-bike for Ronnie; JWoww confronts Pauly's stalker; Snooki and Vinny may have a relationship when they spend a night together drinking.
56	9	"The Truth Will Set You Free"	March 1, 2012	5.30
When The Situation and The Unit decide to stir up trouble, The Unit lands in jail; meanwhile, JWoww plans an anniversary surprise for her boyfriend and Pauly D and Vinny play a prank on JWoww. Pauly D spots Angelina briefly at Jenkinson's.
57	10	"One Meatball Stands Alone"	March 8, 2012	4.84
A huge fight breaks out after Mike tells Jionni he hooked up with Snooki; Deena faces a difficult truth about Joey; some of the roommates go camping while Pauly and Vinny pull off a big prank.
58	11	"We Are Family"	March 15, 2012	4.99
Another summer in Seaside Heights comes to a close as Hurricane Irene batters the East Coast in the Season 5 finale. As the gang prepares to leave, Mike continues to cause trouble by starting a rumor about Deena's sister, while Pauly and Vinny pull one more prank on the roommates. The roommates say goodbye to Seaside Heights with tears and hugs, unaware if they will return.

Title	Episode Shown After	Host	Original air date
Jersey Shore: After Hours	2	Amy Paffrath	January 14, 2012
The Situation, Pauly D, Snooki, and Deena stop by to discuss about Snooki's alleged hookup with The Situation. Things go awry when Mike and Snooki get into a serious argument which leads to crying, screaming and Mike walking off the stage.
Jersey Shore: After Hours	4	Amy Paffrath	January 26, 2012
Vinny, Deena, Pauly D, and The Situation chat about Vinny's return to Seaside, Pauly D's numerous hook-ups and The Situation's birthday blues.
Jersey Shore: After Hours	7	Amy Paffrath	February 16, 2012
It's ladies night as JWoww, Snooki, Deena, and Sammi come together to discuss JWoww's relationship issues with Roger and guidette problems.
Jersey Shore: Reunion	11	Amy Paffrath	March 22, 2012
The cast of 'Jersey Shore' is back together to dish about all the drama in Seaside Heights. The cast tell all and Mike leaves the reunion briefly as the cast talks about his drama.

=== Season 6 (2012) ===
On March 19, 2012, MTV finally confirmed that the series would return for a sixth season at Seaside Heights, with the whole cast returning. Snooki, being pregnant, lived next door to the shore house. On August 30, 2012, it was confirmed that Season 6 would be the final season of the show. Jersey Shore Season 6: The Uncensored Final Season was released on DVD, March 19, 2013.

No. overall	No. in season	Title	Original release date	U.S. viewers (millions)
59	1	"Once More Unto the Beach"	October 4, 2012	4.69
The cast return to the shore for their last summer in the Seaside Heights house in the premiere of the sixth and final season. Mike opens up about his time in rehab and Snooki faces the challenge of being pregnant in a party house.
60	2	"No Shame, Good Integrity"	October 4, 2012	4.17
Deena copes with being away from her boyfriend; Snooki makes a shocking announcement.
61	3	"Toxic Shots Syndrome"	October 11, 2012	2.82
Snooki moves out; Mike struggles through his recovery; Deena copes with being away from her meatball Note: Snooki voluntarily leaves the house due to her pregnancy and moves next door.
62	4	"Blues, Balls & Brawls"	October 11, 2012	3.15
Jenni plans a surprise birthday party for Roger; a brawl breaks out at a club.
63	5	"Merp Walk"	October 18, 2012	3.17
Jenni learns the full extent of her injury. Mike considers taking things with Paula to the next level. When Deena holds Meatball Auditions, she ends up getting arrested by Seaside Heights Police.
64	6	"Let's Make It Official"	October 25, 2012	2.96
Jenni fears that her relationship with Roger is in jeopardy; Mike has second thoughts about his relationship with Paula.
65	7	"Great Meatballs of Fire"	November 1, 2012	2.46
Mike is confused by relationship rules; Deena goes back to her meatball ways.
66	8	"Control the Crazy"	November 8, 2012	2.80
Sammi confronts Deena about her antics; Mike and the roommates learn about Paula's wild side.
67	9	"Make It Unofficial"	November 15, 2012	2.74
Jenni plans a shower for Snooki; the guys support Mike's decision to break up with Paula.
68	10	"Shore Shower"	November 29, 2012	2.41
The Meatballs reconnect; the house discusses Jionni's failings as a father; Vinny nearly has a threesome; Vinny is nervous about Jionni's reaction.
69	11	"Awkward!"	December 6, 2012	2.22
Vinny and Jionni resolve their differences; Mike acknowledges his past mistakes and attempts to make amends.
70	12	"Raining Men & Meatballs"	December 13, 2012	2.03
The roommates hold auditions for a temporary party pal for Deena; Mike reveals he used to be a stripper.
71	13	"The Icing on the Cake"	December 20, 2012	3.13
As the roommates' final summer in Seaside Heights comes to a close in the series finale, the roommates plan a bonfire party at the beach. At the bonfire, Sammi and Ronnie declare to their parents that they are moving in together, much to their parents' chagrin, with them disapproving their decision, reminding them of all their fights. Pauly, Vinny, and the Situation go to the Shore Store one last time to work, with the Situation choosing not to work and sleep, causing Danny to get annoyed. Vinny and Pauly decide to take Sam and Ron's bed to the roof because of Sammi's earlier prank on the boys, however, they pop the inflatable bed. Upon finding out, Ron gets extremely mad and blames it on Sammi, causing another fight, thus causing them to question their relationship. Sammi and JWoww start baking food for Pauly and the Situation's birthdays, and even pick up a cake for the Situation from Paula. The next day, the gang goes tanning, but discover that Paula had made a guy put his testicles on the cake, and even have a picture to prove it. Mike calls her to ask her if it is true, but she 'pretends' to not hear him, thus confirming the cake, causing the Situation to throw and break the duck phone. On the final day at the Shore, the roommates reminisce about how they've changed since their first time at the Shore house. The roommates acknowledge that they are 'family' and now have friends for life. The series ends with Danny putting a Rent sign up on the shore house and an "In memoriam" for the duck phone.

Title	Episode Shown After	Host	Original air date
Jersey Shore: After Hours	5	Amy Paffrath	October 18, 2012
Snooki, The Situation, Ronnie and JWoww chat about returning to Seaside and the newest meatball.
Jersey Shore: After Hours	6	Amy Paffrath	October 25, 2012
Amy Paffrath sits down with Deena, Ronnie, JWoww and Vinny to get the scoop on the big brawl at Karma.
Jersey Shore: After Hours	8	Amy Paffrath	November 8, 2012
Amy Paffrath sits down with Deena, Ronnie, Sam, and Vinny to get the dirt on episode 8. Sammi and Deena get into a heated argument.
Jersey Shore: Dictionary	Rerun of 9	Amy Paffrath	November 21, 2012
Jersey Shore: After Hours	10	Amy Paffrath	November 29, 2012
The boys dish all when MVP and Ronnie chat about what went on during episode 10.
Jersey Shore: After Hours	11	Amy Paffrath	December 6, 2012
Amy Paffrath sits down with Snooki, The Situation, Vinny, Sammi and Deena to get all the dirt on episode 11. They also talk about The Situation finally apologizing to Snooki.
Jersey Shore: Reunion	13	Amy Paffrath	December 20, 2012
The cast joins together for the last time to say goodbye and to relive the best and most shocking moments in 'Jersey Shore' history.
