= Floribama Shore =

American reality television series

- Genre: Reality
- Starring: Jeremiah Buoni; Codi Butts; Kortni Gilson; Aimee Hall; Kirk Medas; Nilsa Prowant; Candace Rice; Gus Smyrnios
- Opening theme: "Sweet Home Floribama"
- Country of origin: United States
- Original language: English
- No. of seasons: 4
- No. of episodes: 75

Production
- Executive producers: SallyAnn Salsano; Drew Tappon; Nina L. Diaz; Jackie French
- Production locations: Panama City Beach, Florida; St. Pete Beach; Missoula, Montana; Lake Havasu City, Arizona; Athens, Georgia
- Running time: 41 minutes
- Production companies: 495 Productions; MTV Production Development

Original release
- Network: MTV
- Release: November 27, 2017 – December 9, 2021

Related
- Jersey Shore; Jersey Shore: Family Vacation; Buckhead Shore

Floribama Shore (sometimes known as MTV Floribama Shore) is an American reality television series that premiered on MTV on November 27, 2017, as a successor to Jersey Shore and as a counterpart to CMT's Party Down South.

== Synopsis ==
The series is set in the Florida panhandle along the beach that stretches all the way to Alabama as it documents eight 20-somethings who live together during the summer on the Gulf Coast in Panama City Beach, Florida.

== Production ==
Filming primarily took place in Florida with the first two seasons of the show in Panama City Beach and the third in St. Pete Beach. Due to the 2020 COVID-19 pandemic, the fourth season saw a location change to Missoula, Montana, Lake Havasu City, Arizona, and Athens, Georgia.

On January 8, 2018, MTV renewed the series for a second season, which premiered on July 9, 2018. On June 11, 2019, the series was renewed for a third season, which premiered on November 14, 2019, with a location change to St. Pete Beach, Florida. Kortni Gilson left the series due to mental health struggles. Mattie Lynn Breaux joined the series as a recurring cast member.

A fourth season was announced on January 26, 2021 and premiered on February 25, 2021. The season saw three new locations for the series (Missoula, Montana, Lake Havasu City, Arizona, and Athens, Georgia). The second part of fourth season premiered on September 16, 2021.

In November 2020, production of the fourth season halted for two weeks due to a production team member testing positive for COVID-19.

In August 2022, it was reported that the series had been shelved indefinitely by the network.

On May 2, 2025, cast member Kirk Medas died of complications with liver failure after a two-week battle with necrotizing pancreatitis. He was 33 years old.

== Cast ==
- Jeremiah Buoni
- Codi Butts
- Kortni Gilson (seasons 1–3)
- Aimee Hall
- Kirk Medas †
- Nilsa Prowant
- Candace Rice
- Gus Smyrnios

=== Recurring ===
- Mattie Lynn Breaux (season 3)

== Episodes ==
=== Series overview ===
Season	Episodes		Originally released	
Season	Episodes		First released	Last released
1	8		November 27, 2017	January 8, 2018
2	26		July 9, 2018	February 7, 2019
3	16		November 14, 2019	February 20, 2020
4	25	13	February 25, 2021	May 27, 2021
4	25	12	September 16, 2021	December 9, 2021

=== Season 1 (2017–18) ===
No. overall	No. in season	Title	Original release date	U.S. viewers (millions)
1	1	"Eat, Pray, Party!"	November 27, 2017	0.84
Panama City Beach serves as the backdrop for a group of eight young Southerners who decide to spend the summer trying to find love, a little extra cash and friends who will become family.
2	2	"Plunger Envy"	November 27, 2017	0.79
Relationships between the housemates strengthen, as well as their friendships with the Panama City Beach locals, but the girls are riled when a woman tries to infiltrate their group.
3	3	"Dollar Draft Beer People"	December 4, 2017	0.78
The battle of the sexes heats up as tension begins to mount. The housemates decide to go out for Draft beer, but find themselves in serious hot water.
4	4	"Home Sweet Home To Me"	December 11, 2017	0.81
Following their massive fight at Donovan's, the housemates soon become closer like a family, however when a mysterious truth about Kayla Jo emerge, it has the power to drive wedge between them all.
5	5	"Love You Like A Brother"	December 18, 2017	0.71
The members of the group band together for a display of strength in numbers. Candace and Nilsa see potential in the guys they meet, and Aimee has old wounds reopened.
6	6	"Princess Goddess Mermaid"	December 25, 2017	0.55
As Aimme continues to deal with her insecurities, the housemates decide to help her realize her self-worth. A friendly bet between the guys almost tears the house in two.
7	7	"Drunken Words; Sober Thoughts"	January 1, 2018	0.58
Tension between the housemates begins to boil over, but when an unexpected death hits the house, it reminds them that life is too short to be having problem, but that's soon forgotten as petty difference and animosity soon threatens to blow the house up once more.
8	8	"Snuggle Puddle"	January 8, 2018	0.78
As the summer winds down, the group decide host one last hurrah by inviting their parents over for a celebration. Before leaving the house, the group spends one last night together reflecting on the summer they just had.

=== Season 2 (2018–19) ===
Filmed from March 2018 to May 2018

No. overall	No. in season	Title	Original release date	U.S. viewers (millions)
9	1	"Psycho-Ass Beach"	July 9, 2018	0.98
The roommates head back to Panama City Beach for the summer, but when the guys pull a prank on one of the girls, a fight breaks out between the whole house.
10	2	"Dirty But Worth It"	July 16, 2018	0.79
The bond between the roommates begin to thin as harsh words cause open wounds between Jeremiah and Codi. Another prank puts the house on high alert. Tired of looking for a wife, Gus adapts a playboy attitude.
11	3	"To Hunch Or Not To Hunch?"	July 23, 2018	0.85
In Nilsa's search for a good guy, she sets her eyes on Gus. Aimee gets violently sick after a night of partying. When the roommates go out to celebrate Gus's 23rd birthday, an altercation occurs that could tear the house in two.
12	4	"Miss La Vela"	July 30, 2018	0.84
Gus' birthday ends in disaster as the cops show up to the house to arrest Kirk.
13	5	"More Than A Boo Thang"	August 6, 2018	0.69
Candace agrees to go on a date with Codi, but after talking to her 'boo-thang' back home, she cancels dinner and Codi's excitement shifts to revenge. Kortni gets in a fight with her boyfriend.
14	6	"Sex, Lies, And Caution Tape"	August 13, 2018	0.64
The excitement of the summer catches up with the roommates. Kortni receives some troubling news from her mom, putting her relationship in danger. Candace invites her boo-thang.
15	7	"Boo-Thang Blues"	August 13, 2018	0.59
Candace and Kortni have their hands full trying to manage their relationships both in and out of the house. A new arrival to the beach house is practically drowning in drama.
16	8	"The Faint Blue Line"	August 27, 2018	0.72
A pregnancy scare pushes Kortni and Logan's toxic relationship to the boiling point. Gus helps Codi get in shape. Candace tries to work things out with Gator Jay.
17	9	"There's No C In Disease"	September 3, 2018	0.56
After Aimee returns, Kortni confronts the house with her pregnancy test results and takes steps to mend her and Candace's friendship.
18	10	"Kook-A-Pooped"	September 10, 2018	0.57
The roommates throw Kortni a 'no-baby' baby shower, Candace opens up to her roommates, and Jeremiah gets a phone call from home.
19	11	"Girl, Bye"	September 17, 2018	0.58
The roommates support Jeremiah as he deals with the death of his grandfather. During a night out, Nilsa gets drunk, which leads to a big fight with Aimee.
20	12	"A Thin Line Between Hunch And Hate"	September 24, 2018	0.60
Gus finds it hard to resist Nilsa's continued advances. A trip to mermaid academy brings healing to Nilsa and Aimee's damaged friendship. The gang tries to keep Kortni from falling for Logan's gift.
21	13	"Scorn In The Bayou"	October 1, 2018	0.52
On a trip to New Orleans, Gus and Nilsa's "friends with benefits" agreement is put to the test, and Candace reveals a devastating secret about Gator Jay.
22	14	"Reservations For Eight"	October 8, 2018	0.56
In the summer finale, following the altercation between Aimee and Gus, The guys and girls go their separate ways on Bourbon Street for their last night in NOLA. When they return to Florida, the housemates run into Logan which ends ugly.
23	15	"Impubescent Clown"	November 29, 2018	0.73
The roommates come together for Kortni when Logan continues to show up and she feels threatened, and Gus gets candid about his painful past.
24	16	"Girl Code Red"	November 29, 2018	0.57
Nilsa plays matchmaker for Aimee, Kortni learns troubling news about Logan, Candace questions her future with Gator Jay, and Nilsa continues to pursue Gus.
25	17	"Hunch Punch"	December 6, 2018	0.69
Things get complicated between Gus and Nilsa after they hook up, and Kortni tells Jeremiah that she has feelings for him.
26	18	"A Whole Lotta Yikes"	December 13, 2018	0.66
Nilsa deals with Gus's playboy ways by getting drunk with Aimee. Kortni deals with Jeremiah's cold shoulder. Tired of the day-to-day in Panama, The housemates decide to take a spontaneous trip to Cabo San Lucas.
27	19	"Let's Taco 'Bout It"	December 20, 2018	0.66
Determined to let loose in Mexico, Kortni and Jeremiah clear the air, Nilsa and Gus flirt with strangers (and each other), and the girls compete in a twerking contest.
28	20	"Too Late For Apologies"	December 27, 2018	0.74
Nilsa tries to play it cool as Gus plays the field in Cabo, Kirk makes things worse when Kortni has an emotional breakdown, and Candace gives Gus a drunk history lesson.
29	21	"Not Nothing Physical"	January 3, 2019	0.79
The roommates plan a beachside dinner for their final night in Cabo, Nilsa confronts Kortni about her relationship with Gus, and eavesdropping leaves Nilsa with an injury.
30	22	"Meet The Buttses"	January 10, 2019	0.72
The roommates' time in Cabo comes to an end, Kortni searches for a way to apologize to Nilsa, and Codi's parents travel to Panama City Beach for a visit.
31	23	"You Had Me At Beer"	January 17, 2019	0.67
With encouragement from his dad, Codi gets up the nerve to try and push things forward with Candace. Gus struggles with the feelings stirred up by the Butts' arrival. Jeremiah trades shirts with Karrie on a wild night out.
32	24	"Newsworthy"	January 24, 2019	0.63
Aimee faces the consequences of her fight, a difference of opinion causes conflict, and the girls put on a wild performance.
33	25	"My Favorite Mistake"	January 31, 2019	0.74
The roommates throw one last hurrah before Candace's early exit. Nilsa's past comes back to her. Following her arrest, Aimee deals with her drunken night out.
34	26	"To Hunch Or To Punch?"	February 7, 2019	0.61
Nilsa tries to balance having 2 exes in the house. Aimee is forced to get a lawyer as her legal trouble begins to mount. Gus begins to think about his future in the house. The housemates have one last dinner together where they reflect on their last 2 months in Panama.

=== Season 3 (2019–20) ===
Filmed from June 2019 to August 2019

No. overall	No. in season	Title	Original release date	U.S. viewers (millions)
35	1	"Thots And Prayers"	November 14, 2019	0.52
After getting kicked out of PCB, the roommates head down to St. Petersburg, Florida for a summer of fun; however a series of bad decisions could change all that.
36	2	"From Mad To Grad"	November 14, 2019	0.49
Candiace is upset over picking bedrooms, and takes it out on Aimee and Nilsa. The roommates come together to throw Aimee an anger management graduation that lands one of the roommates in the hospital.
37	3	"It's My Birthday"	November 21, 2019	0.54
After a fight with Codi, Candiace invites him to lunch to work on their damaged friendship. Kortni returns from the hospital and has a change of personality. Gus's new girlfriend begins to become a topic of the house.
38	4	"Tryna Have A Good Time"	November 21, 2019	0.51
The roommates desperately try to protect Codi from Gus, who has become enraged. Aimee assumes the worst of Dillion when he doesn't pick up the phone. Jerimiah invites a girl over for a Sunday Funday all while Gus struggles with his long distance.
39	5	"Old Gussy's Back"	December 5, 2019	0.65
After his breakup call with Lisa, Gus wastes no time getting back in the game and bringing girls over to the beach house. Nilsa and the other roommates try to figure out how to release Kortni from her tonsil demons.
40	6	"Hog Senses"	December 12, 2019	0.55
Gus's recent breakup leaves his status with Nilsa unclear. However, the dynamic of the house is further complicated when an altercation pushes a friendship to the point of no return.
41	7	"Bro-ke Up"	December 19, 2019	0.65
Tensions are still high as the roommates witness the deterioration of Jerimiah and Gus's friendship. Meanwhile, the girls try to separate from the drama, but find themselves in one their own.
42	8	"Floribama Pride"	December 26, 2019	0.55
Nilsa is attracted to a girl Gus brings home. The housemates attend the St. Pete Pride festival, where they run into Mattie, an old friend of Gus with whom Jerimiah strikes up a friendship.
43	9	"Check Please"	January 2, 2020	0.76
The roommates rally around Aimee as she prepares for her upcoming court date in PCB. Mattie decides to stay in the Beach for the rest of the summer. A friendly bet of dodgeball turns ugly when Gus and Jerimiah comes to blow at Dinner.
44	10	"Let's See Some Butts!"	January 9, 2020	0.74
Codi invites all of the roommates to his parents' house in hope of squashing the beef between Jerimiah and Gus. Meanwhile, Nilsa heads to Nashville to get closure over a loss and helps deepen her friendship with the girls of the house.
45	11	"Return Of The Kookapoo"	January 16, 2020	0.70
Nilsa and the girls head down to South Carolina to join the rest of the guys. Mattie makes a big decision. Jeremiah, Gus and Candace's parents arrive in South Carolina and when the Kookapoo starts flowing, it's not long before everything goes off the rails.
46	12	"Free The Chi Chi's"	January 23, 2020	0.64
Jeremiah and Mattie take their relationship to the next level. The roommates discover that propane, matches and the 4th of July aren't a good mix. Kortni returns to the house with her past as well. An Innocent night out lands another roommate in jail.
47	13	"There's No Pizza In Jail"	January 30, 2020	0.66
After Nilsa gets arrested, the roommates gets into a frenzy over how she's going to get bailed out. Faced with personal demons from her past, Kortni decides to leave the show. Mattie takes Aimee for a special waxing before Aimee's boyfriend visits.
48	14	"Bad Day At The Beach"	February 6, 2020	0.66
Jerimiah lack of communication drives everyone in the house away. But when he opens up, no one is excited for the news he has.
49	15	"All This Over A Flower"	February 13, 2020	0.66
When Josh arrives, it threatens to ruin the rest of the summer. Codi buys some flowers for Candace and the rest of the roommates begin to confront him on her true feelings for her. Jerimiah and Mattie come to the realization that they aren't on the same page for their future.
50	16	"Ta Ta's Up"	February 20, 2020	0.64
After an intense night out, the roommates try to pick up the pieces and work out their unresolved issues as another summer together comes to an end. Gus and Nilsa decide to have one last night together with Whip cream and decide to take it to another level.

=== Season 4 (2021) ===
No. overall	No. in season	Title	Original release date	U.S. viewers (millions)
51	1	"Montanabama Shore"	February 25, 2021	0.55
After their annual summer vacation is upended by the COVID-19, the crew are forced to set their sights on somewhere out of place and exotic: Montana. Nilsa walks into the house with very surprising news.
52	2	"Puke Rally Relay"	March 4, 2021	0.51
The roommates get re-acquainted in Montana with their own boozy version of the Olympic Games; Nilsa's pregnancy announcement sends Gus into an emotional tailspin.
53	3	"On Thin Ice"	March 11, 2021	0.48
Gus confronts Nilsa about some allegations of cheating; Codi and Candace tell their parents that they are getting married; a weather emergency leaves the Southerners stranded in an unfamiliar environment.
54	4	"Dude, Where's My Hair Dryer?"	March 18, 2021	0.42
55	5	"Door Dash"	March 25, 2021	0.57
56	6	"All Copacetic"	March 25, 2021	0.59
57	7	"Bygones"	April 1, 2021	0.53
58	8	"Club La Basement"	April 8, 2021	0.58
59	9	"Such A Gentleman"	April 15, 2021	0.51
60	10	"Animal Therapy"	April 22, 2021	0.55
61	11	"Havasu Heat"	April 29, 2021	0.44
62	12	"Butts & Hall's Hangover Cure"	May 6, 2021	0.45
63	13	"Exposed"	May 13, 2021	0.45
Part 2
64	14	"Welcome To The Peach House"	September 16, 2021	0.36
65	15	"Pushing The Limit"	September 23, 2021	0.36
66	16	"Pig Poop And Rally"	September 30, 2021	0.36
67	17	"It Takes Toe To Tango"	October 7, 2021	0.31
68	18	"The GOAT Of All Birthdays"	October 14, 2021	0.27
69	19	"A Lot Alike"	October 21, 2021	0.28
70	20	"Arms Folded, Fingers Crossed"	October 28, 2021	0.26
71	21	"Camp Peach"	November 4, 2021	0.29
72	22	"Yardi Gras"	November 11, 2021	0.36
73	23	"Family Reunion"	November 18, 2021	0.31
74	24	"Floribama Shower"	December 2, 2021	0.27
75	25	"See Ya, Peach House"	December 9, 2021	0.23

== Specials ==
Featured season	Title	Original release date	U.S. viewers (millions)
2	"Total Shore Takeover: Jersey x Floribama"	July 5, 2018	N/A
2	"After the Show (#201)"	July 9, 2018	N/A
2	"After the Show (#202)"	July 16, 2018	N/A
2	"After the Show (#203)"	July 23, 2018	N/A
2	"Everything You Need to Know"	November 19, 2018	N/A
2	"After the Show (#226)"	February 7, 2019	N/A
4	"Reunion (Part 1)"	May 20, 2021	N/A
4	"Reunion (Part 2)"	May 27, 2021	0.41

== Other appearances ==
Nilsa, Jeremiah, Aimee and Kirk competed in a special episode of Fear Factor against Deena Nicole Cortese, Snooki, Pauly D and Ronnie Ortiz-Magro from Jersey Shore: Family Vacation. Aimee and Nilsa appeared on the first season of How Far Is Tattoo Far?, while Codi and Kirk appeared on the second season. Mattie Lynn Breaux was a cast member on CMT's Party Down South. Smyrnios and Breaux appeared on the 33rd season of The Challenge, with Breaux later returning to the competition for the 35th season.
