= Wicked Summer =

- Genre: Reality
- Developed by: Doron Ofir Casting
- Country of origin: United States
- Original language: English
- No. of seasons: 0 aired
- No. of episodes: 0 aired

Production
- Running time: Unknown

Wicked Summer was a planned TV series similar to the reality series Jersey Shore. According to its producers, it was to be filmed around Boston and Cape Cod in Massachusetts. After an open casting advertisement in 2010, there has been no subsequent activity associated with the series. This show is not to be confused with the planned reality show that was planned to showcase people in South Boston.

== History ==
Following the widely popular first season of Jersey Shore, spinoffs were planned by independent companies. One of these spinoffs was to have a show with the Jersey Shore theme filmed in the Boston area. The open casting is looking for, "...blue collar, hard working, harder partying, tough talking, damn good-looking Mass natives from all over the state..." The casting site also is written in a stereotypical view of how Bostonians supposedly speak, leaving out the letter R in many instances. The producers of the show also don't plan on having the original Jersey Shore group shown unless they come to visit.

In addition to the Massachusetts spinoff, Doron Ofir Casting, has also stated that they want to create a Persian themed show in the Los Angeles area.

== Reaction ==
Vanity Fair Daily has gone as far as calling the show and its twin Persian version fake as they won't either be supported by MTV and are just capitalizing on the success of the popular show. Rumors have been spread over the internet concerning the fact that MTV is supposedly sponsoring the spinoff. This has been denied by both MTV and independent websites. One of the few similarities between the show and Jersey Shore is that they have the same casting director.

A Facebook group has even been created protesting the show. The main goal of the group is to protesting the creation of a perceived negative image of Cape Cod.
