= Doron Ofir =

Television casting director

- Education: University of Miami
- Occupation: Casting director
- Known for: President of Doron Ofir Casting

Doron Ofir is an American casting director and president of Doron Ofir Casting, a division of Popular Productions, Inc. He has worked on various reality television programs, including MTV's Jersey Shore and A Shot at Love with Tila Tequila, HGTV's Design Star, NBC's Nashville Star, Fox's More to Love, E!'s Rich Kids of Beverly Hills, among others. He has been credited as Casting Director, Executive Producer, or Executive Head of Casting on more than 100 television productions.

== Early life ==
Ofir grew up in Great Neck, New York, on Long Island. He moved to Miami, Florida, where he attended the University of Miami. From 1989 to 1995, he was a well known doorman at clubs including The Roxy and Liquid. CBS hired him in 2000 to recruit contestants for the reality-television competition The Amazing Race. He then cast the ABC reality-TV show Are You Hot?: The Search for America’s Sexiest People. He went on to work in casting at MTV, and founded Doron Ofir Casting in 2007 and Popular Productions two years later.
