= All Star Shore =

2022 American reality television series

- Genre: Reality competition
- Narrated by: DJ Pauly D Nicole Polizzi
- Country of origin: United States
- Original language: English
- No. of seasons: 2
- No. of episodes: 23

Production
- Executive producers: Antonia Mattia; Jacquelyn French; John Varela; Lotte Wink; Matt Apps; SallyAnn Salsano; Scott Jeffress
- Production locations: Canary Islands, Spain; Cartagena, Colombia
- Running time: 42–46 minutes
- Production companies: White Label Productions; ITV Studios Netherlands; MTV Entertainment Studios

Original release
- Network: Paramount+
- Release: June 29 – August 31, 2022
- Network: MTV
- Release: September 21 – December 7, 2023

Related
- Jersey Shore; Geordie Shore; Acapulco Shore; Rio Shore; Germany Shore; Warsaw Shore

All Star Shore is an American reality competition television series that premiered on June 29, 2022. It is a successor to Jersey Shore that features television stars from around the world as they live together in a villa and compete in party-style challenges for $150,000.

== Production ==
The series was announced on February 15, 2022, when Paramount+ announced their new slate of shows. The first season was shot in Spain during the COVID-19 pandemic between November and December 2021, the cast had to undergo a quarantine period before filming began.

On August 24, 2023, it was announced that the series would move to MTV for its second season, which premiered on September 21, 2023, and featured Nicole "Snooki" Polizzi as the narrator. Filming for the second season took place in late February and early March of the same year in Cartagena, Colombia.

== Contestants ==
=== Season 1 ===
Cast member	Original series	Outcome
Marina Gregory	The Circle: Brazil	Winners (Note: James & Marina were declared the winners of the Final Shore-Down after winning the "Shore Is Lava" portion. However, they later had to compete against each other in "The Golden Cup" Final Twist challenge to determine who would win the $150,000 prize. Marina defeated James and won the money.)
James Tindale	Geordie Shore	Winners
Karime Pindter	Acapulco Shore	Finalists
Ricardo Salusse	Rio Shore	Finalists
Luis "Potro" Caballero	Acapulco Shore	Finalists
Vanessa Vanjie Mateo	RuPaul's Drag Race	Finalists
Angelina Pivarnick	Jersey Shore	Lost final Exile
Johnny Middlebrooks	Love Island USA 2	Lost final Exile
Bethan Kershaw	Geordie Shore	Lost final Exile
Blake Horstmann	Bachelor in Paradise	Lost final Exile
Giannina Gibelli	Love Is Blind	Lost final Exile
Trina Njoroge	Love Island USA 3	Lost final Exile
Joey Essex	The Only Way Is Essex	Lost final Exile
Mike Mulderrig (Note: Before the "Climb That Wood" Exile game in episode 9, Chloe withdrew from the competition following multiple arguments with fellow cast members during the preceding days. Mike joined the competition as a replacement for Chloe at the end of the episode.)	Lindsay Lohan's Beach Club	Lost final Exile
Mike Mulderrig	Ex on the Beach USA 5	Lost final Exile
Chloe Ferry	Geordie Shore	Withdrew

=== Season 2 ===
Cast member	Original series	Outcome
Fabio De Pasquale	Germany Shore	Winners (Note: Chase & Fabio won the Final Shore Down, but they must compete against each other to determine who would win the prize money. Fabio beat Chase in the final game and was declared the winner of the season.)
Chase Demoor	Too Hot to Handle	Winners
Guilherme "Gui" Evaristo	Rio Shore	Finalists
Marnie Simpson	Geordie Shore	Finalists
Isabel "Isa" Castro	Acapulco Shore	Finalists
Xavier "Xavi" Ulibarri	Acapulco Shore	Finalists
Hatitza "Hati" Garderobe	Germany Shore	Lost final Exile
Chantelle Connelly	Geordie Shore	Lost final Exile
Patryk Spiker	Warsaw Shore	Lost final Exile
Vinny Guadagnino	Jersey Shore	Lost final Exile
Tamaris Sepulveda	FBoy Island	Lost final Exile
Melinda Melrose	Too Hot to Handle	Lost final Exile

== Format ==
At the start of each season, cast members compete in a challenge which generally randomly determines the initial teams. Teams begins with a certain amount of "Paradise points" and attempt to earn more points during the season. The format is as follows:

- Paradise Game: Teams compete in a "Paradise game" where the last-place team is automatically sent to the Exile game. The winning team earns a "Paradise reward" and the ability to select a second team to compete in the Exile game against the last-place team. Additionally, the first, second and third-place teams from the game receive 30, 20 and 10 Paradise points respectively. For the second season, this was changed to 300, 200, and 100 points respectively.
- Exile Game: The last-place team from the Paradise game compete in the Exile game against the team selected by the winners of the Paradise game. The losing pair lose all their points and must spend the night at an Exile location.

After the final Paradise game, the two teams with the most Paradise points automatically advanced to the Final Shore-Down. The remaining teams had to compete in a final Exile game to determine the third team to compete in the Final Shore-Down.

Twists

- Partner Swap: At the episode 7 nominations in season 1, after the "Keg Stand" Paradise game but before the "What a Load of Crap" Exile game, cast members switched teams. Half of each teammate's former score at the time were combined to determine newly-formed team's Paradise point totals. In season 2 episode 6, three teams switch partners.
- Three-Way Exile Game: In season 2 episode 5, the winners of the "Next Round's on Me" Paradise game nominate two teams instead of one for a three-way exile game.
- Paradise Rewards and Exiles: For the first nine episodes, the winners of Paradise games are rewarded with a special "Paradise reward" experience and selects a second team to join them. Meanwhile, the team that loses the Exile game are exiled from the villa and must spend the night at an Exile location.

== Gameplay ==
=== Paradise games ===
==== Season 1 ====
- Party Pong: Played tournament-style over four rounds. One team member must retrieve a net of balls floating in the water. They must then bounce the ball off a table to their partner who must catch them while standing in a giant cup, and must switch to a different cup after each catch. The first team to make three catches in each matchup advance to the next round. The team that wins the final round wins while the team that loses the first round the fastest is automatically sent to the Exile game.
  - Winners: Angelina & Joey
- Poppin' Bottles: One team member must climb up a slide to collect a champagne bottle and slide down again. They must then spray the champagne onto their partner's chest so the champagne flows down into a glass that they're holding against their body, and continue until they collect enough champagne to fill a container and reach a cork. Once they remove the cork, the first team to build a three-level pyramid using the empty champagne bottles wins. (Note: During the "Poppin' Bottles" Paradise game, Angelina & Joey were disqualified for pouring the champagne into their glass rather than spraying it as instructed and were automatically declared the last-place team.)
  - Winners: Ricardo & Vanjie
- Keg Stand: Teams dig under a fence to reach two beer kegs on the other side and pump the beer inside to fill a pitcher. They must then use the kegs to cross a section of the beach without touching the sand and pump the remaining beer into two beer glasses. The first team to finish wins while the last team to finish is automatically sent to the Exile game.
  - Winners: Blake & James
- Host With the Most: Teams spin an oversized record player until the disc rises to a needle. They must then throw a disco ball around a spool until the attached string is fully wrapped around the spool. Once complete, teams then arrange a series of colored bottles so that no row or column can have the same colors. The first team to finish wins while the last team is automatically sent to the Exile game.
  - Winners: James & Marina
- Shots and Found: One team member searches through pools of jello for five items commonly lost when drunk: keys, phone, sunglasses, wallet and watch. After finding each item, they must crawl under two beams and throw the item into a basket their partner is holding. The first team to find all five items and land them in their basket wins. (Note: Angelina and Trina were hospitalized during the "Shots and Found" Paradise game for various injuries and did not compete. Additionally, Giannina was also not medically cleared to compete in the Paradise game after recently returning from hospital. Therefore, Giannina & Trina were disqualified and Johnny (Angelina's partner) had to compete alone.)
  - Winners: Karime & Ricardo

==== Season 2 ====
- Foam Party: Teams must assemble a puzzle to reveal the name of a popular party destination. Once complete, they move on to a marquee that has the name of their destination spelled out, but missing some letters. They must search a foam pit for the missing letters and place them on their marquee to complete the destination name. The first team to finish wins while the last team to finish is automatically sent to the Exile game.
  - Winners: Tamaris & Vinny
- Wild Card: Played in two rounds. In the first round, teams must memorize a poker hand, cross a series of oversized poker chips to the other side of the beach and then search for the correct cards to recreate the hand. The three fastest teams advance to the second round where they repeat this process. The team with the fastest time in the second round wins while the team that loses in the first round the fastest is automatically sent to the Exile game.
  - Winners: Fabio & Hati
- Next Round's On Me: Wearing beer pitchers on their heads, teams must cross a slippery bar to a beer tap and fill up their pitchers with beer before using the pitchers to fill seven empty glasses. The first team to fill all seven glasses wins while the last team is automatically sent to the Exile game.
  - Winners: Chantelle & Spiker
- Sex on the Beach: Player must add a mixer to make a giant Sex on the Beach. The juicers are attached to the players’ bums and they must squeeze the juice mixer into the cup. Finally, they must dig through ice with their hands to add a giant cherry.
  - Winners: Melinda & Xavi
- Drop the Beat: Teams play one at a time to grab records from a jukebox, run up an incline and drop it into a peg board. They must get a vinyl in each slot in order to finish. The team with the best time wins.
  - Winners: Gui & Marnie
- Tipsy Hammocks: For the last Paradise Game, the two teams with the highest score secured their spot in the Final Shore Down. Teams must fill the opponents’ hammocks with coconuts and break the hammock. Teams untie the coconuts from the bags and run to the throw line to throw as many coconuts as they can into their opponents’ hammock. Five coconuts will break the hammock. The last standing hammock wins. Points are doubled since it's the last game.
  - Winners: Gui & Marnie

=== Exile games ===
==== Season 1 ====
- Chummin' It Up: Team members begin on opposite sides of a wall. One team member grabs a fishing net full of chum and pushes it through a porthole their partner. Their partner must then search through the chum for a flare, place it in its holder and light it, repeating this process for all five nets of chum. Team members must switch positions after lighting each flare. The first team to light all five flares wins.
  - Played by: Chloe & Potro vs. Johnny & Trina
- Dumpster Diving: Teams search through a dumpster and the surrounding garbage cans for four condoms with numbers inside the packaging, which form the combination to unlock teams' dumpsters. The first team to unlock their dumpsters, push them to the center of the Exile arena and close themselves inside wins.
  - Played by: Angelina & Joey vs. Bethan & Marina
- What a Load of Crap: Teams must throw camel dung at three targets above their opponents. Each time team's targets are hit, a trough of camel dung opens onto them. The first team to hit all three of their opponent's targets wins.
  - Played by: Chloe & Joey vs. Potro & Vanjie
- Climb That Wood: Teams climb up a "mountain" of stairs covered in slippery sap to collect four pine cones at the top, one at a time. The first team to collect all four pine cones wins.
  - Played by: Angelina & Johnny vs. Giannina & Trina
- Haunted Vineyard: Before the Exile game, all teams enter a building within the Viñedo de Oscura Sangre where they would learn the legend of Salvador Herman Tejino, the historic owner of the vineyard who murdered his victims and added their blood to red wine. Afterwards, teams must search the vineyard for five bags of puzzle pieces hidden at the five locations where Salvador buried his victims (chicken coop, church, kitchen, plantain farm and scenic overlook) and use the pieces to solve a puzzle revealing a map. They must then search for a key at the location depicted on the map and use it to unlock the vineyard gates and escape. Teams also receive a one-second head start for each Paradise point they possess. The first team to escape wins and advance to the Final Shore-Down.
  - Played by: Angelina & Johnny vs. Bethan & Blake vs. Giannina & Trina vs. Joey & Mike vs. Potro & Vanjie

==== Season 2 ====
- The Hangover: Played in two rounds. Each round, one player must answer a question about their partner which their partner must match to earn points. Players are dunked in an oversized toilet of "vomit" after each non-match. The team with the most points after both rounds wins.
  - Played by: Chase & Melinda vs. Gui & Marnie
- Party Crashers: Teams must clean a room by smashing the furniture and items in the room and fitting the debris through a small hole in the wall. The first team to completely clear their room wins.
  - Played by: Chantelle & Spiker vs. Tamaris & Vinny
- Pub Crawl: Everyone competes individually rather than with their teammate. Everyone must crawl under three different pathways to a pub game. They then must complete each game and then return to the starting point after doing so. The winner gets the opportunity to pick their new teammate as well as assign the rest of the teams.
  - Played by: Chase vs. Fabio vs. Hati vs. Isa vs. Melinda vs. Xavi
- 1 Tequila, 2 Tequila, 3 Tequila, Floor: Players pull a rope to pour margarita mix from a giant bottle into their mouths. They must spit the mix into two bottles each that are filled with a worm and suck the worm out. They also must compete dressed as worms.
  - Played by: Chantelle & Spiker vs. Chase & Fabio
- Sunburned: The teams take turn rolling a ball up a ramp to hit a paper target. Hitting a target causes a bucket of sunscreen drop on their opponent and the first team to knock all three buckets wins.
  - Played by: Chase & Fabio vs. Melinda & Xavi
- Fort-y Hands: The teams compete individually, the two contestants that win form the third team and advance to the Final Shore Down. Players start the game with both hands strapped around two beer bottles. In order to free their hands, they must find a key hidden within the fort. They cannot unlock themselves, instead they must find someone else and trust the other person will unlock them in return.
  - Played by: Chantelle vs. Hati vs. Isa vs. Melinda vs. Spiker vs. Tamaris vs. Vinny vs. Xavi

=== Final Shore-Down ===
==== Season 1 ====
The two teams with the highest points at the end of the "Shots and Found" Paradise game, and the winning team from the "Haunted Vineyard" Exile game competed in the Final Shore-Down.

- Shore Is Lava: Teams must take two cups from one side of the Arena to the other, crossing an obstacle course made of items used during previous Paradise and Exile games. After crossing the course, both team members must successfully flip the cup on a table, before repeating this process for all three obstacle courses. Teams must return to the start of each course if they fall off or drop their cups. The first team to cross all three courses and successfully flip all six cups are declared the winners of the Final Shore-Down.
  - Winners: James & Marina

Final Twist

After winning the Final Shore-Down, it was revealed that James & Marina had to compete against each other in the "Final Twist" challenge to determine who would win the $150,000 grand prize.

- The Golden Cup: Each round, players are randomly assigned either an empty box or a box containing a golden cup. One player may look inside their box to see which one they have. Based on the contents inside, they must then try to convince their opponent to either keep or swap boxes. Afterwards, their opponent can choose to keep their box or swap boxes. The player who ends up with the golden cup at the end of each round wins the round. The first player to win two rounds wins the $150,000 grand prize.
  - Winner: Marina

==== Season 2 ====
The first two teams to win the final Paradise game advances to the Final Shore Down. The third team to advance to the finals is determined by the final Exile game. The finals are played in two games.

- Money Shot: Teams must bounce a coin into a shot glass. The first two team to bounce four coins into the glass advances to the next game. The team that comes in last place is eliminated.
  - Eliminated: Isa & Xavi
- Battle Hooks: Teams must get their ring hooked. They then must run to the wooden peg and move it to one slot closer to their opponents' side. The team who moves past the opposing team's last peg wins.
  - Winners: Chase & Fabio

Final Twist

Like the previous season, Chase and Fabio must compete against each other after winning the Final Shore Down to determine who would win the $150,000.

- Rock, Paper, Scissors: In order to win the season and the cash prize, Chase and Fabio choose an either a rock, scissors, or toilet paper. They say the item they're going to choose, but they don't have to tell the truth. They hide the item under a dome and on the count of three, they reveal what they chose. Whoever wins two rounds wins.
  - Winner: Fabio

== Game summary ==
=== Season 1 ===
Episode		Winners	Exile teams		Exile game	Exile outcome	
#	Paradise game	Winners	Last-place	Winners' Pick	Exile game	Winners	Exiled
1/2	Party Pong	Angelina & Joey	Johnny & Trina	Chloe & Potro	Chummin' It Up	Johnny & Trina	Chloe & Potro
3/4	Poppin' Bottles	Ricardo & Vanjie	Angelina & Joey	Bethan & Marina	Dumpster Diving	Angelina & Joey	Bethan & Marina
5/6/7 (Note: Instead of the winners of the "Keg Stand" Paradise game selecting a team for the Exile game, contestants switched teammates during the episode 7 nominations. Half of each teammate's points at the time were combined to determine newly-formed team's paradise point totals. As Chloe & Potro placed last in the same paradise game, they would compete against each other in the upcoming Exile game with their new respective teammates.)	Keg Stand	Blake & James	Chloe & Potro	—N/a	What a Load of Crap	Potro & Vanjie	Chloe & Joey
8/9	Host With the Most	James & Marina	Giannina & Trina	Angelina & Johnny	Climb That Wood	Angelina & Johnny	Giannina & Trina
#	Paradise game	Winners	Exile teams		Exile game	Winners	Eliminated
10/11	Shots and Found	Karime & Ricardo	Angelina & Johnny		Haunted Vineyard	Potro & Vanjie	Angelina & Johnny
10/11	Shots and Found	Karime & Ricardo	Bethan & Blake		Haunted Vineyard	Potro & Vanjie	Bethan & Blake
10/11	Shots and Found	Karime & Ricardo	Giannina & Trina		Haunted Vineyard	Potro & Vanjie	Giannina & Trina
10/11	Shots and Found	Karime & Ricardo	Joey & Mike		Haunted Vineyard	Potro & Vanjie	Joey & Mike
10/11	Shots and Found	Karime & Ricardo	Potro & Vanjie		Haunted Vineyard	Potro & Vanjie	—N/a
10/11	Final Shore-Down	Winners	—N/a				
10/11	Shore Is Lava	James & Marina	—N/a				
10/11	The Golden Cup	Marina	—N/a				

==== Point progress ====
Contestants	Episodes					
Contestants	1/2	3/4	5/6/7	8/9	10/11	Finale
Marina	10	0	35	65	85	WINNER
James	20	40	35	65	85	WINNER
Karime	10	10	30	30	60	FINALIST
Ricardo	10	40	30	30	60	FINALIST
Potro	0	0	20	20	20	FINALIST
Vanjie	10	40	20	20	20	FINALIST
Angelina	40	40	35	55	0	
Johnny	10	10	35	55	0	
Bethan	10	0	35	45	0	
Blake	20	40	35	45	0	
Giannina	10	10	25	0	0	
Trina	10	10	25	0	0	
Joey	40	40	0	0	0	
Mike					0	
Chloe	0	0	0	0		

- Paradise points at the end of each cycle

Competition key

The contestant's team won the Final Shore-Down
The contestant's team lost the Final Shore-Down
The contestant's team lost the final Exile game and did not advance to the Final Shore-Down
The contestant's team won the Paradise game and earned 30 points
The contestant's team was not selected for the Exile game
The contestant's team won the game in Exile
The contestant's team lost the Exile game and lost all of their points
The contestant withdrew from the competition

==== Partner progress ====
Contestants	Episodes					
Contestants	1/2	3/4	5/6/7	8/9	10/11	Finale
Marina	Bethan		James			
James	Blake		Marina			
Karime	Giannina		Ricardo			
Ricardo	Vanjie		Karime			
Potro	Chloe		Vanjie			
Vanjie	Ricardo		Potro			
Angelina	Joey		Johnny			
Johnny	Trina		Angelina			
Bethan	Marina		Blake			
Blake	James		Bethan			
Giannina	Karime		Trina			
Trina	Johnny		Giannina			
Joey	Angelina		Chloe		Mike	
Mike					Joey	
Chloe	Potro		Joey			

=== Season 2 ===
Episode		Winners	Exile teams		Exile game	Exile outcome	
#	Paradise game	Winners	Last-place	Winners' Pick	Exile game	Winners	Exiled
1/2	Foam Party	Tamaris & Vinny	Gui & Marnie	Chase & Melinda	The Hangover	Gui & Marnie	Chase & Melinda
3/4	Wild Card	Fabio & Hati	Tamaris & Vinny	Chantelle & Spiker	Party Crashers	Chantelle & Spiker	Tamaris & Vinny
5/6	Next Round's on Me	Chantelle & Spiker	Isa & Xavi (Note: Teams played individually rather than with their teammate.)	Fabio & Hati	Pub Crawl	Chase	Hati & Isa
5/6	Next Round's on Me	Chantelle & Spiker	Isa & Xavi	Chase & Melinda	Pub Crawl	Chase	Hati & Isa
7/8	Sex on the Beach	Melinda & Xavi	Chantelle & Spiker (Note: Chantelle & Spiker were disqualified during the paradise game because Spiker dug through the ice with his shoe rather than his hands.)	Chase & Fabio	1 Tequila, 2 Tequila, 3 Tequila, Floor	Chase & Fabio	Chantelle & Spiker
9/10	Drop the Beat	Gui & Marnie	Melinda & Xavi	Chase & Fabio	Sunburned	Chase & Fabio	Melinda & Xavi
#	Paradise game	Winners	Exile teams		Exile game	Winners	Eliminated
11/Finale	Tipsy Hammocks	Gui & Marnie	Chantelle & Spiker		Fort-y Hands	Isa & Xavi	Chantelle
11/Finale	Tipsy Hammocks	Gui & Marnie	Hati & Isa		Fort-y Hands	Isa & Xavi	Hati
11/Finale	Tipsy Hammocks	Gui & Marnie	Melinda & Xavi		Fort-y Hands	Isa & Xavi	Melinda
11/Finale	Tipsy Hammocks	Gui & Marnie	Tamaris & Vinny		Fort-y Hands	Isa & Xavi	Spiker
11/Finale	Tipsy Hammocks	Gui & Marnie	—N/a		Fort-y Hands	Isa & Xavi	Tamaris
11/Finale	Tipsy Hammocks	Gui & Marnie	—N/a		Fort-y Hands	Isa & Xavi	Vinny
11/Finale	Final Shore-Down	Winners	—N/a				
11/Finale	Money Shot	Chase & Fabio	—N/a				
11/Finale	Battle Hooks	Chase & Fabio	—N/a				
11/Finale	Rock, Paper, Scissors	Fabio	—N/a				

==== Point progress ====
Contestants	Episodes						
Contestants	1/2	3/4	5/6 (Note: The three teams competing in the Exile game competed individually. The winner got the power to assign the new teams, where players split half of their paradise points, which were combined to determine their new scores. Chase won and chose Fabio as his new partner. Isa placed last in the exile game and lost all of her points. Chase selected Hati to be Isa's new partner, therefore losing her points as well and being sent to exile.)	7/8	9/10	11	Finale
Fabio	400	700	450	550	550	550	WINNER
Chase	0	0	450	550	550	550	WINNER
Gui	100	200	300	500	800	1400	FINALIST
Marnie	100	200	300	500	800	1400	FINALIST
Isa	100	200	0	0	100	100	FINALIST
Xavi	100	200	200	500	0	200	FINALIST
Chantelle	400	400	700	0	0	400	0
Spiker	400	400	700	0	0	400	0
Hati	400	700	0	0	100	100	0
Melinda	0	0	200	500	0	200	0
Tamaris	500	0	0	0	200	200	0
Vinny	500	0	0	0	200	200	0

- Paradise points at the end of each cycle

Competition key

The contestant's team won the Final Shore-Down
The contestant's team lost the Final Shore-Down
The contestant's team lost the final Exile game and did not advance to the Final Shore-Down
The contestant's team won the Paradise game and earned 300 points
The contestant's team won the final Paradise game and earned 600 points
The contestant's team was not selected for the Exile game
The contestant's team won the game in Exile
The contestant's team was chosen for the Exile game
The contestant's team lost the Exile game and lost all of their points

=== Partner progress ===
Contestants	Episodes							
Contestants	1/2	3/4	5	6	7/8	9/10	11	Finale
Fabio	Hati			Chase				
Chase	Melinda			Fabio				
Gui	Marnie							
Marnie	Gui							
Isa	Xavi			Hati				Xavi
Xavi	Isa			Melinda				Isa
Chantelle	Spiker							
Spiker	Chantelle							
Hati	Fabio			Isa				
Melinda	Chase			Xavi				
Tamaris	Vinny							
Vinny	Tamaris							

== Paradise rewards and Exiles ==
=== Season 1 ===
For the first nine episodes, the winners of each Paradise game are given a special Paradise reward experience and selects a second team to join them. The team that loses the Exile game are exiled from the villa and must spend the night at an Exile location.

Episode	Paradise reward		Exile	
Episode	Teams	Reward	Team	Exile location
1/2	Angelina & Joey	Teams get to spend the afternoon on a catamaran cruise stocked with champagne	Chloe & Potro	The team must spend the night on an old fishing boat loaded with crates of fish
1/2	Blake & James	Teams get to spend the afternoon on a catamaran cruise stocked with champagne	Chloe & Potro	The team must spend the night on an old fishing boat loaded with crates of fish
3/4	Chloe & Potro	Teams get to drive a Chevrolet Corvette to a vineyard and spend the afternoon tasting local wine	Bethan & Marina	The team must spend the night in a deserted beach shack. However, they could escape by solving a series of clues to find an oar and paddle off the beach
3/4	Ricardo & Vanjie	Teams get to drive a Chevrolet Corvette to a vineyard and spend the afternoon tasting local wine	Bethan & Marina	The team must spend the night in a deserted beach shack. However, they could escape by solving a series of clues to find an oar and paddle off the beach
5/6/7	Blake & James	Teams get to spend the afternoon receiving spa treatments at a high-end spa	Chloe & Joey	The team must spend the night outside next to four camels. However, they could unlock a nearby yurt to sleep in by solving a series of clues
5/6/7	Giannina & Karime	Teams get to spend the afternoon receiving spa treatments at a high-end spa	Chloe & Joey	The team must spend the night outside next to four camels. However, they could unlock a nearby yurt to sleep in by solving a series of clues
8/9	Angelina & Johnny	Teams get to spend the afternoon riding jetskis at a beach club. Later in the night, all remaining teams joined them at the beach club	Blake & Trina (Note: Giannina was hospitalized after suffering an allergic reaction at the end of the "Climb That Wood" Exile game. Another cast member had to spend the night in Exile with her partner Trina; Blake volunteered.)	The team must spend the night in a dark forest where they would find six coins. They could use the coins either to buy snacks from a vending machine, or to operate a claw machine to try and grab a phone to call a taxi and escape
8/9	James & Marina	Teams get to spend the afternoon riding jetskis at a beach club. Later in the night, all remaining teams joined them at the beach club	Blake & Trina	The team must spend the night in a dark forest where they would find six coins. They could use the coins either to buy snacks from a vending machine, or to operate a claw machine to try and grab a phone to call a taxi and escape

=== Season 2 ===
Episode	Paradise reward		Exile	
Episode	Teams	Reward	Team	Exile location
1/2	Tamaris & Vinny	The teams get to spend the afternoon riding on ATVs and get to chill in a Jacuzzi.	Chase & Melinda	The team must spend the night in the "Exile Hotel".
1/2	Gui & Marnie	The teams get to spend the afternoon riding on ATVs and get to chill in a Jacuzzi.	Chase & Melinda	The team must spend the night in the "Exile Hotel".
3/4	Fabio & Hati	The teams get to spend the night salsa dancing.	Tamaris & Vinny	The team must to spend the night in a cow pen. They receive ingredients to make a meal but must start a fire to cook them, either using a bow drill or searching through cow dung for a lighter.
3/4	Chantelle & Spiker	The teams get to spend the night salsa dancing.	Tamaris & Vinny	The team must to spend the night in a cow pen. They receive ingredients to make a meal but must start a fire to cook them, either using a bow drill or searching through cow dung for a lighter.
5/6	Chantelle & Spiker	The teams get to go horseback riding and later have a tropical picnic.	Hati & Isa	The team must spend the night in a bat cave and build a bed.
5/6	Gui & Marnie	The teams get to go horseback riding and later have a tropical picnic.	Hati & Isa	The team must spend the night in a bat cave and build a bed.
7/8	Melinda & Xavi (Note: Melinda chose to leave early after the rest of the teams joined them in Cartagena.)	Teams get to have a private photoshoot in Cartagena. Later, the rest of the cast got to join them in the town.	Chantelle & Spiker	The team must spend the night at the "Exile Bar" and find beer seltzers by filling barrels with water from the pond.
7/8	Chase & Fabio	Teams get to have a private photoshoot in Cartagena. Later, the rest of the cast got to join them in the town.	Chantelle & Spiker	The team must spend the night at the "Exile Bar" and find beer seltzers by filling barrels with water from the pond.
9/10	Gui & Marnie	Teams get to spend the day at a spa.	Melinda & Xavi	The team must spend the night on a boat full of garbage. They must undo a rope to unlock a cage with a bed and the instructions are in the trash.
9/10	Chantelle & Spiker	Teams get to spend the day at a spa.	Melinda & Xavi	The team must spend the night on a boat full of garbage. They must undo a rope to unlock a cage with a bed and the instructions are in the trash.
11/Finale	—N/a		Chantelle & Spiker	Teams must spend the night in a fort and have an hour to find a beer tap.
11/Finale	—N/a		Hati & Isa	Teams must spend the night in a fort and have an hour to find a beer tap.
11/Finale	—N/a		Melinda & Xavi	Teams must spend the night in a fort and have an hour to find a beer tap.
11/Finale	—N/a		Tamaris & Vinny	Teams must spend the night in a fort and have an hour to find a beer tap.

== Episodes ==
=== Series overview ===
Season	Episodes	Originally released		
Season	Episodes	First released	Last released	Network
1	11	June 29, 2022	August 31, 2022	Paramount+
2	12	September 21, 2023	December 7, 2023	MTV

=== Season 1 (2022) ===
No. overall	No. in season	Title	Original release date
1	1	"Welcome to the Shore!"	June 29, 2022
2	2	"We're All Small Prostitutes"	June 29, 2022
3	3	"It Must Have Been the Massage"	July 6, 2022
4	4	"Burning Down The House"	July 13, 2022
5	5	"Shore-Embarrassing"	July 20, 2022
6	6	"Grab A Shot, You're Gonna Need It!"	July 27, 2022
7	7	"What A Load of Crap!"	August 3, 2022
8	8	"Best Friends, Lots of Benefits"	August 10, 2022
9	9	"A, B, C You Later"	August 17, 2022
10	10	"The Game is Bigger Than You"	August 24, 2022
11	11	"The Final Shore-Down"	August 31, 2022

=== Season 2 (2023) ===
No. overall	No. in season	Title	Original release date	US viewers (millions)
12	1	"Who's Ready to Party?"	September 21, 2023	0.10
13	2	"Puke & Rally"	September 28, 2023	0.08
14	3	"Your Brain is Like a T-Rex"	October 5, 2023	0.07
15	4	"Karma is a Beotch!"	October 12, 2023	0.10
16	5	"I'm Too Pretty For This"	October 19, 2023	0.11
17	6	"Say Bye, Bye to Your Partner"	October 26, 2023	N/A
18	7	"I Had a Drink Thrown in My Face"	November 2, 2023	N/A
19	8	"I'd Rather Be a Worm Than a Rat"	November 9, 2023	N/A
20	9	"We're All Naked... It's Carnage"	November 16, 2023	N/A
21	10	"This Is a Case for THE FBI"	November 30, 2023	N/A
22	11	"Who Do You Trust?"	December 7, 2023	N/A
23	12	"The Final Shore-Down"	December 7, 2023	N/A
