= Frenchie Shore =

French reality television series

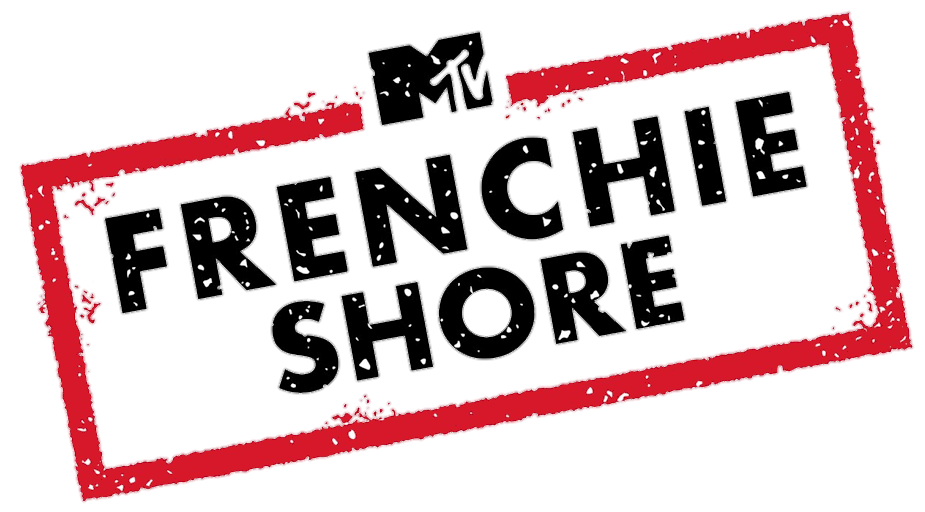
- Genre: Reality
- Created by: MTV
- Country of origin: France
- Original language: French
- No. of seasons: 3
- No. of episodes: 20

Production
- Producer: Antoine Henriquet
- Running time: 1 hours
- Production company: Ah! Production

Original release
- Network: MTV France; Paramount+
- Release: November 11, 2023 – present

Frenchie Shore is a French reality television series broadcast on MTV France and Paramount+. It premiered on November 11, 2023, it is the French branch of the American show Jersey Shore. The show follows the daily lives of ten housemates who live together for several weeks.

== Production ==
In February 2022, Paramount Global announced a new line of unscripted series and renewals for MTV Entertainment Studios that included seven new versions of the Shore franchise.

The first season was confirmed on October 12, 2023. The series was filmed in a house in the town of Cap d'Agde in Hérault, in the Occitania department, in the south of France.

A second season of the show was ordered on May 1, 2024. It premiered on MTV and Paramount on November 23, 2024. It includes four new cast members, including Enzo Hardouin, Foster Rowland, Guillaume Arab and Yamina. As the second season progressed, Patrick Amoros joined the cast. (Note: Patrick Amoros joined the show as a special guest, however, starting with the sixth episode he was credited as a main cast member.)

In March 2026, the program was renewed for a third season. On October 27, 2026, the first promotional photo featuring the cast was released, along with a release date: November 21, 2026.

== Cast ==
=== Current cast ===
Cast member	Age	Hometown	Series
Enzo Tripiana	21	Marignane	1–
Marine "Pepita" Beguier	22	Lyon	1–
Ouryel Myr	24	Lyon	1–
Tristan Jouve	24	Montpellier	1–
Yamina	28	Paris	2–
Cendres Paulin	25	Montpellier	3–
Ilann	26		3–
Melody	22	Montpellier	3–
Tia	22		3–

=== Former cast ===
Cast member	Age	Hometown	Series
Iris Gaumont	23	Vendée	1–2
Julie Bacha	23	Paris	1, 2
Laurie "Kara" Raymond	24	Paris	1–
Théo Voiseux	22	Villepinte	1, 2
Nicolas Fouillot	24	Paris	1, 2
Melvin Proix	24	Garches	1
Enzo Hardouin		Montpellier	2
Foster Rowland	28	Paris	2
Guillaume Arab	30	Belgium	2
Patrick Amoros	26	Aubagne	2

Special guests

- Maxime Marciano (season 1)
- Dorian Beloc (season 1)
- Lucien Perrier (season 2)
- Agathe Pelous (season 2) (Note: Agathe arrived at the house with Nicolas Fouillot, her then boyfriend, and despite being accredited in the confessionals, she was not an official member of the cast.)
- Anouck (season 2)
- Kingsley Gouebe-Bazille (season 2)
- Nikos (season 2)

== Duration of cast ==
Current cast members
Cast members	Series 1										Series 2										Series 3									
Cast members	1	2	3	4	5	6	7	8	9	10	1	2	3	4	5	6	7	8	9	10	1	2	3	4	5	6	7	8	9	10
Enzo																														
Ouryel																														
Pépita																														
Tristan																														
Yamina																														
Former cast members
Iris																														
Kara																														
Julie																														
Nicolas																														
Théo																														
Melvin																														
Foster																														
Hardouin																														
Guillaume																														
Patrick																														
Special Guest
Maxime																														
Dorian																														
Lucien																														
Agathe																														
Niko																														
Anouck																														
Kingsley																														

Key: = Cast member is featured in this episode.
Key: = Cast member arrives in the house.
Key: = Cast member voluntarily leaves the house.
Key: = Cast member leaves and returns to the house in the same episode.
Key: = Cast member joins the series, but leaves the same episode.
Key: = Cast member returns to the house.
Key: = Cast member features in this episode, but outside of the house.
Key: = Cast member does not feature in this episode.
Key: = Cast member leaves the series.
Key: = Cast member returns to the series.
Key: = Cast member is removed from the series.
Key: = Cast member returns to the series, but leaves same episode.
Key: = Cast member features in this episode despite not being an official cast member at the time.

== Episodes ==
=== Series overview ===
Season	Episodes	Originally released	
Season	Episodes	First released	Last released
1	10	November 11, 2023	January 6, 2024
2	10	November 23, 2024	January 18, 2025
3	TBA	November 21, 2026	TBA

=== Season 1 (2023) ===
No. overall	No. in season	Title	Original release date	Paramount+ release date
1	1	"Welcome to the Frenchie Store"	November 11, 2023	November 12, 2023
2	2	"Uncontrolled skating"	November 11, 2023	November 12, 2023
3	3	"The art of ruining your vacation in 3 lessons"	November 18, 2023	November 19, 2023
4	4	"All French people have their place at Frenchie Shore"	November 25, 2023	November 26, 2023
5	5	"Follow me, I'm running away from you..."	December 2, 2023	December 3, 2023
6	6	"An ass between two chairs"	December 9, 2023	December 10, 2023
7	7	"Dangerous double play"	December 16, 2023	December 17, 2023
8	8	"The musical chairs"	December 23, 2023	December 24, 2023
9	9	"If everything were simple, they'd be bored"	December 30, 2023	December 31, 2023
10	10	"The end!"	January 6, 2024	January 7, 2024
–	–	"Reunion"	October 26, 2024	October 26, 2024

=== Season 2 (2024) ===
No. overall	No. in season	Title	Original release date
11	1	"Guess who’s back?"	November 23, 2024
12	2	"Trouble, flirting and tears!"	November 23, 2024
13	3	"Club and pool party, summer has begun!"	November 30, 2024
14	4	"The villa is about to explode"	December 7, 2024
15	5	"A Frenchie leaves us…"	December 14, 2024
16	6	"No Nico, no party"	December 21, 2024
17	7	"Fantasies, confessions and a surprise guest!"	December 28, 2024
18	8	"Settling of scores!"	January 4, 2025
19	9	"The French Shore party!"	January 11, 2025
20	10	"This is the end"	January 18, 2025

== Controversy and criticism ==
In an interview with Le Parisien on 20 November 2023, Rima Abdul Malak, French Minister of Culture, criticises Frenchie Shore, explaining that the programme "borders on pornography" and is concerned about access to the programme by minors.

On 13 December 2023, Roch-Olivier Maistre, president of Arcom, announced during a hearing in the French Senate that he had contacted the authorities of the Czech Republic and Germany, countries where the parent companies of Paramount+ and MTV France are located, to ensure compliance with current legislation. He also specifies that Arcom has intervened on the main social networks to speed up the moderation of content accessible online.

On 24 November 2023, the producer of the programme Arthur responds to the criticism by explaining that the format has existed for several years abroad and that in France it is not accessible to everyone, stressing the need for a paid subscription to access the content; “Frenchie Shore is as profitable as a Canal+ porn film on Saturday nights, although we are not at that level either”.

=== Lawsuit for sexual assault ===
In January 2025, cast member Laurie Raymond sued her co-star Melvin Proix for two alleged acts of sexual assault, allegedly in collusion with Julie Bacha; the two were in a relationship at the time. Following a countersuit filed by the couple, there were no active legal proceedings by the end of the year.
