= Buckhead Shore =

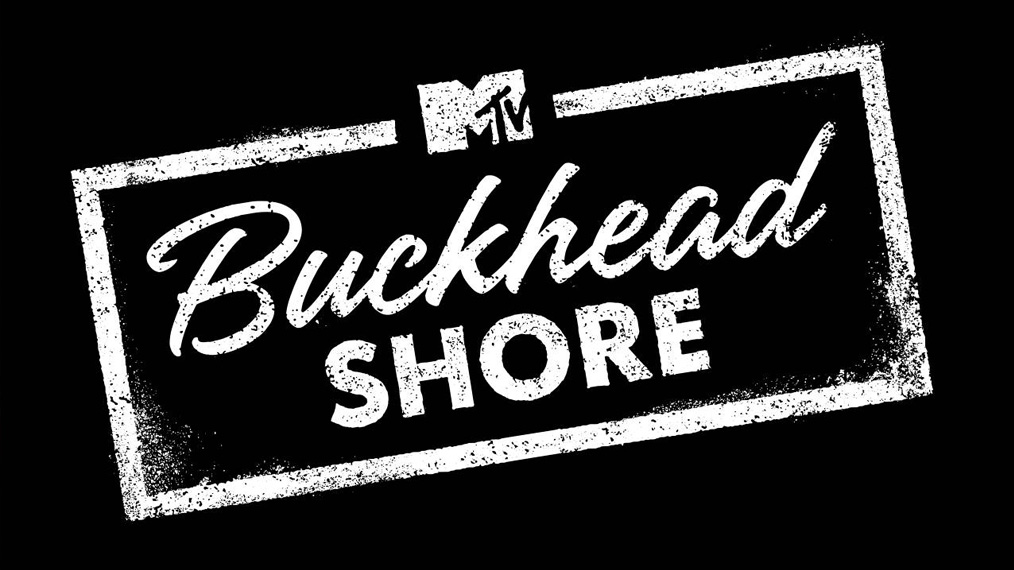
- Genre: Reality
- Starring: Bethania Locke; Parker Lipman; Katie Canham; Adamo Giraldo; DJ Simmons; Savannah Nicole Gabriel; Chelsea Prescott; Julian Barney
- Opening theme: "Too Lit" by ADGRMS & Dexx! Turner
- Country of origin: United States
- Original language: English
- No. of seasons: 1
- No. of episodes: 12

Production
- Executive producer: SallyAnn Salsano
- Production locations: Buckhead; Atlanta; Lake Burton
- Production companies: 495 Productions; MTV Entertainment Studios

Original release
- Network: MTV; AFN Spectrum
- Release: June 23 – September 1, 2022

Related
- Jersey Shore; Floribama Shore

Buckhead Shore is an American reality television series, which premiered on MTV on June 23, 2022. capitalizing on the success of predecessors Jersey Shore and Floribama Shore.

== Synopsis ==
The series is set in the Atlanta neighborhood of Buckhead in Georgia documenting the ups and downs of everyday life, drama and romance of eight 20-somethings living together during the summer around Lake Burton.

== Cast ==
=== Main ===
- Adamo Giraldo
- Bethania Locke
- Chelsea Prescott
- DJ Simmons
- Katie Canham
- Julian "JuJu" Barney
- Parker Lipman
- Savannah Nicole Gabriel

=== Recurring ===
- Patrick Muresan

== Episodes ==
No.	Title	Original release date	US viewers (millions)
1	"Lakehouse, Here We Come!"	June 23, 2022	0.12
2	"You Got Caught"	June 23, 2022	0.12
3	"I Was Waiting for Wine to Get Thrown"	June 30, 2022	0.16
4	"You Kissed Chelsea?"	July 7, 2022	0.18
5	"When They Go Low, You Go to Hell"	July 14, 2022	0.15
6	"Worst Game Ever"	July 21, 2022	0.13
7	"I Miss You Even When I'm with You"	July 28, 2022	0.15
8	"You're Going to Be Happy Now"	August 4, 2022	0.14
9	"I Thought We Were Brothers"	August 11, 2022	0.12
10	"There's Ripples in Love, There's Ripples in Life"	August 18, 2022	0.10
11	"Reunion (Part 1)"	August 25, 2022	0.13
12	"Reunion (Part 2)"	September 1, 2022	0.13
