= Canada Shore =

2026 Canadian reality television series

- Genre: Reality
- Starring: Emmett Watson; Lila Romanin; Emmy Sharpe; Isaiah Crawford; Keyaira Snow; Bauer Swystun; Gizelle Fray; Ethan Maynard; Christopher Brown; Ryleigh Gregory
- Opening theme: "Big Boom" by Rêve
- Country of origin: Canada
- Original language: English
- No. of seasons: 1
- No. of episodes: 10

Production
- Executive producers: Erin Brock; John Brunton
- Producer: Olga Devyst
- Cinematography: Ryan Shaw
- Production company: Insight Productions

Original release
- Network: Paramount+
- Release: January 22, 2026 – present

Related
- Shore franchise

Canada Shore is a Canadian reality television series that premiered on Paramount+ on January 22, 2026. following the format of its predecessor Jersey Shore. The show follows the daily lives of ten housemates who live together for several weeks in Kelowna.

== Production ==
On April 9, 2025, the start of production on the first Canadian installment of the Shore franchise was announced. Filming took place at a country house in Kelowna between June and August of that year.

Snooki is credited as the "boss" of the team and, therefore, makes recurring appearances on the show.

The cast was announced on November 27, 2025, and the first promotional trailer featuring the cast members was released in January 2026. The series premiered worldwide on January 22, 2026 on Paramount+.

In April 2026, the series was renewed for a second season. On October 1, 2026, the first trailer was released, announcing Snooki’s return as the boss.

== Cast ==
Cast member	Age (Note: Ages reflect at the time of filming)	Hometown
Bauer Swystun	22	Prince Albert, Saskatchewan
Christopher Brown	22	Toronto
Emmett Watson	25	Vancouver
Emmy Sharpe	21	Fredericton
Ethan Maynard	23	Newmarket, Ontario
Gizelle Fray	25	Mississauga
Isaiah Crawford	26	Calgary
Keyaira Snow	23	Halifax, Nova Scotia
Lila Romanin	20	Toronto
Ryleigh Gregory	25	Bridgewater, Nova Scotia

== Episodes ==
No.	Title	Original release date
1	"Whassup New Fam"	January 22, 2026
2	"Pick a Struggle"	January 22, 2026
3	"Don't Salt on Me"	January 29, 2026
4	"Shorty Want a T-shirt?"	February 5, 2026
5	"It's Giving Guy's Girl"	February 12, 2026
6	"Gargle Gargle"	February 19, 2026
7	"This is High School"	February 26, 2026
8	"Crash Out"	March 5, 2026
9	"All Bark No Bite"	March 12, 2026
10	"Absolute Nail Guns"	March 19, 2026
