= Angelina Pivarnick =

American television personality (born 1986)

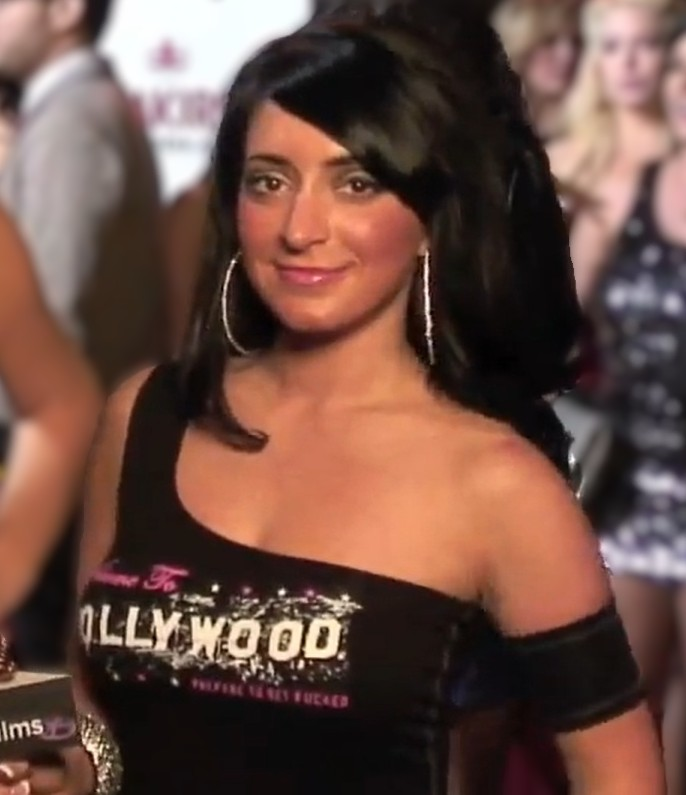
- Pivarnick in 2010
- Born: Angelina Marie Pivarnick; June 26, 1986 (age 40); Staten Island, New York, U.S.
- Occupation: Reality television personality
- Years active: 2009–present
- Known for: Jersey Shore; Couples Therapy; Jersey Shore: Family Vacation
- Spouse: Chris Larangeira (m. 2019; div. 2022)

Angelina Marie Pivarnick (born June 26, 1986) is an American reality television personality who is best known for starring in the first two seasons of the MTV reality show Jersey Shore and its spin-off, Jersey Shore: Family Vacation. She also appeared on the VH1 show Couples Therapy in 2012.

== Early life ==
Pivarnick was born and raised in Great Kills, Staten Island, New York. She has two sisters. She graduated from Susan E. Wagner High School with her Jersey Shore costar, Vinny Guadagnino.

== Career ==
Before she joined the cast of Jersey Shore, Pivarnick worked as a waitress. Jersey Shore premiered on December 4, 2009. After refusing to work her shift at the T-shirt shop, she was evicted from the shore house in the third episode of season one. She then was on Jersey Shore season two in Miami Beach, Florida and Pivarnick again departed the house during season two after violent confrontations with fellow cast-members Michael Sorrentino and Nicole "Snooki" Polizzi. She did not return for season three. Pivarnick made guest appearances during the fifth and sixth seasons.

In 2010, Pivarnick released the song "I'm Hot". She and her boyfriend appeared in Season 1 of the VH1 reality show Couples Therapy, which premiered March 25, 2012.

In March 2011, Pivarnick appeared on the professional wrestling promotion Total Nonstop Action Wrestling, competing in a six-person tag team match.

In 2011, Pivarnick briefly appeared in the music video for rap group Dacav5's song "Dirty Style." She also appeared as a contestant on the reality dating series Excused. She made it to the final round and was chosen by Sergio to try dating each other. She later released a new song, "Gotta Go Out", under the name Miss AP in August 2011, featuring Tony Hanson "Fenix". The song charted at No. 37 on the Billboard Dance/Club Play Songs list in the United States.

In September 2012, she engaged in a debate with recording artist Adam Barta on the topic of gay marriage, which she said she opposed. She later reversed her position after Jersey Shore co-star JWoww criticized her on Twitter, and issued a public apology via TMZ. In December, Pivarnick announced a single release called "Serendipity" with Barta, in the hopes of making amends with the LGBT community.

In 2018, Pivarnick and her fiancé Chris Larangeira appeared on the show How Far Is Tattoo Far?

From 2019–2021, Pivarnick made guest appearances on Double Shot at Love.

Pivarnick returned to the Jersey Shore franchise by joining the sequel series, Jersey Shore: Family Vacation in 2018 as a recurring guest. She became a full-time cast member in 2019.

== Personal life ==
Pivarnick became engaged to Chris Larangeira in January 2018 after a year of dating. They married in November 2019. Larangeira filed for divorce in February 2022 after two years of marriage, citing irreconcilable differences. On an April 2023 episode of Jersey Shore: Family Vacation, it was announced that she is engaged to Vinny Tortorella. Pivarnick and Tortorella called off their engagement in January 2025 amidst accusations that he was cheating on her. In May 2026, Pivarnick announced that she was pregnant with her first child. Two weeks later, she revealed that she had suffered a miscarriage.

Pivarnick is a registered emergency medical technician and worked for the FDNY in Staten Island. In 2020, she settled a lawsuit against a lieutenant of hers whom she accused of sexual harassment.

== Filmography ==
| Year | Production | Role | Notes |
|---|---|---|---|
| 2009–2010, 2012 | Jersey Shore | Herself | Main (seasons 1 & 2), Guest (seasons 5 & 6) |
| 2010 | When I Was 17 | Herself | Guest |
| 2012 | Couples Therapy | Herself | Main |
| 2018–2026 | Jersey Shore: Family Vacation | Herself | Main (seasons 2–8), Recurring (seasons 1–2) |
| 2018 | How Far Is Tattoo Far? | Herself | Guest |
| 2019–2021 | Double Shot at Love | Herself | Guest |
| 2022 | All Star Shore | Herself | Contestant; season 1 |
