= Jersey Shore (TV series) =

American reality television series

- Genre: Reality
- Developed by: SallyAnn Salsano
- Starring: Pauly D; Nicole Polizzi; Michael Sorrentino; Sammi Giancola; Ronnie Ortiz-Magro; Jennifer Farley; Vinny Guadagnino; Angelina Pivarnick; Deena Nicole Cortese
- Opening theme: "Get Crazy" by LMFAO
- Country of origin: United States
- Original language: English
- No. of seasons: 6
- No. of episodes: 71 (list of episodes)

Production
- Executive producers: SallyAnn Salsano; Scott Jeffress; Jacquelyn French
- Running time: 42 minutes
- Production companies: 495 Productions; MTV Production Development

Original release
- Network: MTV
- Release: December 3, 2009 – December 20, 2012

Related
- Jersey Shore: Family Vacation; Snooki & Jwoww; The Pauly D Project; The Show with Vinny; Floribama Shore; Buckhead Shore; All Star Shore

Jersey Shore is an American reality television series that ran on MTV from December 3, 2009, to December 20, 2012. The series follows the lives of eight housemates at a vacation home, for seasons one, three, five, and six on the Shore in Seaside Heights, New Jersey; plus for season two in South Beach, Florida; and for season four in Florence, Italy.

The show debuted amid controversy regarding its use of the terms guido and guidette and its portrayal of Italian Americans, which some alleged perpetuated stereotypes. It was also criticized by locals who observed that few of the cast members were natives or residents of the area. (Most of the cast was from New York, and at least two cast members were not of Italian descent.)

The show became a pop culture phenomenon with classes and conferences at universities about the show and journalists listing it as one of the most notable shows of the time. The Shore franchise spawned several international adaptations in other countries. Four of the Jersey Shore cast members received spin-off shows on MTV, with the most successful being Snooki & Jwoww. Most of the cast went on to appear in other reality programs or receive their own shows on various networks.

On August 20, 2017, a one-off television special called Reunion Road Trip: Return to the Jersey Shore aired on the E! network. On November 27, 2017, MTV announced that the cast (with the exception of Giancola) would be reuniting in Miami, Florida, for a new reunion series titled Jersey Shore: Family Vacation. The series premiered globally on April 5, 2018.

A spin-off series, All Star Shore, was released on June 29, 2022. It features Jersey Shore and other reality stars from around the world as they live together in a villa to compete for $150,000.

== Overview ==
Season	Episodes	Originally released	
Season	Episodes	First released	Last released
1	9	December 3, 2009	January 21, 2010
2	13	July 29, 2010	October 21, 2010
3	13	January 6, 2011	March 24, 2011
4	12	August 4, 2011	October 20, 2011
5	11	January 5, 2012	March 15, 2012
6	13	October 4, 2012	December 20, 2012

== Cast ==
=== Overview ===
Cast member	Seasons					
Cast member	1	2	3	4	5	6
Paul "Pauly D" DelVecchio	Main	Main	Main	Main	Main	Main
Nicole "Snooki" Polizzi	Main	Main	Main	Main	Main	Main
Mike "The Situation" Sorrentino	Main	Main	Main	Main	Main	Main
Sammi "Sweetheart" Giancola	Main	Main	Main	Main	Main	Main
Ronnie Ortiz-Magro	Main	Main	Main	Main	Main	Main
Jenni "JWoww" Farley	Main	Main	Main	Main	Main	Main
Vinny Guadagnino	Main	Main	Main	Main	Main	Main
Angelina Pivarnick	Main	Main			Guest	Guest
Deena Cortese			Main	Main	Main	Main

Name	Hometown	Ethnicity	Biography
Deena Nicole Cortese; Seasons 3–6	New Egypt, New Jersey	Italian American	Cortese, a longtime friend of Polizzi, had originally auditioned for season 1 and been rejected. She eventually joins the cast starting in season 3. She describes herself as a "blast in a glass".
Paul DelVecchio "Pauly D"	Johnston, Rhode Island	Italian American	DelVecchio is a disc jockey from Johnston, Rhode Island outside of Providence. He strikes up a brief romance with fellow castmate Farley but the relationship does not progress. DelVecchio was nominated for the 2010 "America's Best DJ" competition.
Jennifer Farley "JWoww"	Franklin Square, New York	Irish-Spanish American	Farley is a graphic designer and club promoter from Franklin Square, New York. During the casting process, she stated, "I thought the guys would be enormous and really mean, and I thought the girls would be catty and overdone." She enters the shore house with a steady relationship at home but cheats on her boyfriend with castmate DelVecchio and ends her relationship in season 3 episode 4 for different reasons. Farley has had breast augmentation surgery, which she got as a birthday present to herself just before turning 21.
Samantha Giancola "Sammi Sweetheart"	Hazlet, New Jersey	Italian-Greek American	Giancola is from Hazlet, New Jersey and is recently single at the start of the series. She attended William Paterson University and was a midfielder on the women's soccer team. Giancola ultimately strikes up a relationship with fellow castmate Ortiz-Magro in season 1 episode 3.
Vinny Guadagnino	Staten Island, New York	Italian American	21-year-old Guadagnino comes from a traditional Italian American family in Staten Island. A graduate of the State University of New York at New Paltz who had plans to attend law school if acting did not work out. Guadagnino applied after a friend sent him an application asking for "the orangest, most muscley, spiky-haired people", which Guadagnino filled out "as a joke". Describing first meeting his castmates, he says, "I see Pauly and his spiky hair and his whole guido look. Great, they found the most stereotypical kid. Then Snooki seems like a train wreck. But you realize we're all starting this crazy new adventure."
Ronnie Ortiz-Magro	Bronx, New York	Italian-Puerto Rican American	Ortiz-Magro is from The Bronx in New York City. He strikes up a relationship with castmate Giancola.
Angelina Pivarnick; Seasons 1 & 2	Staten Island, New York	Polish-Italian American	Pivarnick is a New York City bartender. She starts out the season with a serious relationship at home, but the two break up in episode 3, which indirectly leads to her eviction from the shore house after refusing to work her shift in the T-shirt shop. Pivarnick again departed the house during Season 2, after violent confrontations with Mike and Nicole. She did not return for Season 3. She calls herself the "Kim Kardashian of Staten Island", but is mocked by other cast members as the "Staten Island dump" or the "Rob Kardashian of Staten Island". Pivarnick made brief cameos during Seasons 5 & 6.
Nicole Polizzi "Snooki"	Marlboro, New York	Born in Chile (adopted by Italian-American parents)	Polizzi is from Marlboro, New York, and is an aspiring veterinary technician. She applied to an ad on Facebook that said "Calling all guidos and guidettes," which Polizzi said, "was definitely about my lifestyle." Polizzi earned the nickname "Snooki" in middle school after being the first of her friends to "make out" with a boy. She became the center of controversy when a man punched her in her face during a bar confrontation. Polizzi was arrested by Seaside police on July 30, 2010, on public intoxication charges, which were later dropped. She previously suffered from an eating disorder in high school.
Michael Sorrentino "The Situation"	Staten Island, New York	Italian American	Sorrentino, an assistant manager of a fitness center in Staten Island, develops an attraction towards Giancola, which does not come into fruition when she becomes interested in fellow castmate Ortiz-Magro. Sorrentino worked as an exotic dancer in 2004. In the 2010 season of Dancing with the Stars, he partnered with Karina Smirnoff, but was eliminated in week 4. He also appeared on the British television show Celebrity Big Brother in August 2012.

== Production history ==
VH1 producer Anthony Beltempo proposed the idea of a show focusing on the "guido" lifestyle for TV, in the form of a male competition series. Executive producer SallyAnn Salsano, who previously worked on A Shot at Love with Tila Tequila, devised a new concept, inspired by her own summers in a Jersey summer shore house, and retained casting director Doron Ofir to find the cast. MTV Networks President Van Toffler felt that the series' "loud, young, bold" style was better suited to MTV's sensibilities than VH1, and MTV programming executive Tony DiSanto felt that "[After The Hills], it was time to go for a more authentic approach, like a documentary." Van Toffler described the casting process by saying they looked for "candor, honesty, boldness and a very combustible, chaotic mess. You could honestly say none of these people were traditionally beautiful."

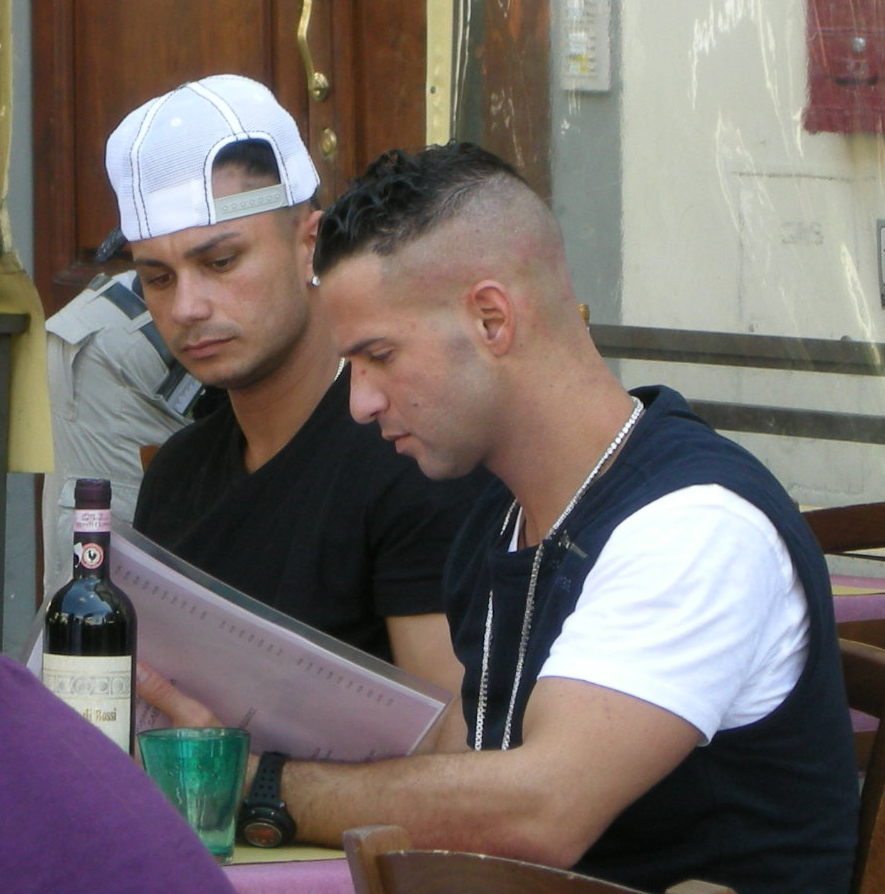
Paul "DJ Pauly D" DelVecchio (left) and Mike "The Situation" Sorrentino (right) during shooting in Florence, Italy in May 2011

The series follows the lives of eight housemates spending their summer in a summer share in Seaside Heights, New Jersey, known as The Jersey Shore House, as well as other locations in other seasons. Residences include a confessional room for cast members to self-record their thoughts on daily house drama. Season 1 followed cast members Angelina Pivarnick, Jennifer Farley, Michael Sorrentino, Nicole Polizzi, Paul DelVecchio, Ronald Ortiz-Magro, Samantha Giancola, and Vincenzo Guadagnino at the Jersey Shore. Jersey Shore premiered on December 3, 2009, with back-to-back episodes, averaging 1.375 million viewers. Although the initial ratings were considered unimpressive to Salsano, they slowly grew in popularity, and was the subject of parody on Saturday Night Live after the third week, a turnaround that MTV executive Tony DiSanto calls "the fastest 0 to 60 I've ever seen on a show". Season 1 posted strong growth every week and ranked #1 in its time period versus all cable competition among P12–34 (people 12 to 34 years old) during the first quarter of 2010, with a season high 2.6 rating for the finale. The season 1 finale audience, 4.8 million, was more than triple that of the premiere, an increase of more than 3.4 million, and was MTV's highest rated original series telecast in almost two years. Overall, the season 1 averaged 2.7 million viewers.

In an article in Rolling Stone, it was mentioned that the house had 35 remote-controlled cameras in fixed locations, 12 hand-held ones, one IMX camera and six DV cameras. Nicole Polizzi said that:

They have cameras everywhere, all the time ... You're always being watched. You kind of get a little paranoid, because you're like, 'Who's watching me?' ... It's trippy. it messes with your head. But that's why we go crazy. That's why we fight with each other. That's why we drink. We're living in a house for two months with that shit. We can't have cellphones, TV, radio or internet ... There's no normalcy. It's like a prison, with cameras. The only time we're not on camera is when we're in the shower, and that's why we all take three-hour showers, just to get away from it all.

After Season 1, the cast negotiated pay increases, though both they and DiSanto explained that it was not contentious, and was given undue weight by the press. Rather than wait until the next New Jersey summer for Season 2, the production moved to Miami.

In January 2010, MTV announced that a second season consisting of 12 episodes had been ordered and would air that summer. It would follow all of the first-season cast as they avoided the cold northeast winter by relocating to the South Beach, Florida. In May 2010 the cast relocated back to the Jersey Shore for the rest of filming, but it was later determined that the production company had enough footage from the Miami shoot to fill the entire second season, and that the footage to be shot at the Jersey Shore would be used for a third season. The second season premiered on July 29, 2010, averaging 5.252 million viewers. Season 2 was the #1 television series in the P12-34 demographic for the summer of 2010 across all TV and has also posted continued growth every week.

On July 20, 2010, MTV announced that the cast would return for a third season, with the exception of Pivarnick. Season 3 returned to the original Jersey Shore summer setting, and replaced Angelina with Deena Nicole Cortese, a longtime friend of Polizzi. The season's January 6, 2011 premiere was viewed by a record 8.45 million viewers, making it MTV's most viewed series telecast ever. The second episode of the season once again set a series and MTV high at the time, with 8.56 million viewers, only to set another record with the airing of the fourth episode, which garnered 8.87 million viewers.

On January 25, 2011, it was confirmed that the show had been renewed for a fourth season, to be filmed in Italy during the first half of 2011. The fourth season premiered August 4, 2011. MTV confirmed in June 2011 that the fifth season would return to Seaside Heights.

Believed complications caused by Nicole Polizzi's pregnancy, and several cast members (including Polizzi, DelVecchio, and Farley) receiving spin-offs sparked talk about the future of the series past the fifth season, however on March 19, 2012, MTV officially confirmed that the series would return for a sixth season, with all cast members returning. Filming for the sixth season took place in mid-2012, and featured Polizzi nearly eight months pregnant. MTV said in a statement, "While things will definitely be a little different this time when they hit the boardwalk, their trademark hilarity and family dysfunction will remain the same."

=== Jersey Shore house ===
Jersey Shore
- Location within New Jersey

General information
- Type: House
- Location: 1209 Ocean Terrace, Seaside Heights, New Jersey, 08751
- Coordinates: 39.9455°N 74.0701°W
- Governing body: Private

Technical details
- Size: 1,896 square feet (176.1 m^{2})

The Jersey Shore house is the name given to the house used on MTV show Jersey Shore. Located in Seaside Heights, the house was used during the first season, starting on December 3, 2009, and was used on the show in four out of the six seasons, the exceptions being season 2 (Miami Beach, Florida) and season 4 (Florence, Italy). Since the show's cancellation, the house is currently being rented out for days at a time; it was reported in 2018 that the house was renting for $1,200 a night.

The house was characterized by its unique decor and the hot tub. During the filming of Jersey Shore, the house was decorated with Scarface posters and Cadillac symbols and wheels. The house is also home to the duck phone, a home telephone in the form of a mallard duck. All of the furniture that is seen on the show was brought in by the production company, including the hot tub, for which they needed a permit from Seaside Heights when filming.

=== Employment ===
While staying in Seaside Heights, NJ, the cast worked at a local boardwalk store, the "Shore Store", which was owned by Danny and Paul Merk. Danny was also the landlord of the cast's summer house. He described Mike Sorrentino, a self-proclaimed slacker, as the laziest guy in the world. However, he added that Mike was the most talented when it came to sales. The cast started off earning $10 an hour, receiving $20 an hour by the end of the series.

The Miami season (second season) saw the group working at the Lecca Lecca Gelato Caffé situated in South Beach. Producers decided on the location due to its Italian roots. The cast "slaved over cold gelato", working four-hour shifts.

In Florence, the cast worked at the O'Vesuvio pizza parlor located near the Uffizi Gallery.

== Media and merchandise ==
=== DVD releases ===
On February 23, 2010, Amazon.com and MTV teamed up to release Jersey Shore on DVD. The title theme, "Get Crazy" by LMFAO, has been changed. Other songs have been changed since their original air date as well. A retail release by Paramount Home Entertainment with added commentary was released on July 20. Although it is claimed the DVDs are uncensored, the video and some audio is still censored. The DVD also includes special features include deleted scenes, the reunion special, "Tips From The Situation and Snooki", "Before the Shore", and the "Jersey Shore Makeover with Michael Cera", amongst others. On December 28, 2010, the Season 2 Uncensored DVD was released. On July 26, 2011, the Season 3 Uncensored DVD was released. On December 27, 2011, the Season 4 Uncensored DVD was released. On August 28, 2012, the Season 5 Uncensored DVD was released. On March 19, 2013, the Season 6 Uncensored DVD was released.

=== Soundtrack and literature ===
A soundtrack to the series was released as Jersey Shore Soundtrack by MTV and Universal Republic on July 20, 2010. Aimed to create the perfect summer playlist, the album features songs from a variety of artists including Enrique Iglesias, Pitbull, Taio Cruz, Ludacris, Lil Jon, 3OH!3, David Guetta, Fergie, Chris Willis, Girlicious, and LMFAO as well as DJs like Deadmau5, Steve Aoki, Tiësto, Diplo, Paul Oakenfold, and Delvecchio. A deluxe edition of the album was also released containing a bonus CD featuring songs inspired from the first season of the show, like LMFAO's "Get Crazy". The first single off the album was Enrique Iglesias' "I Like It", whose video also featured the Jersey Shore cast. In September 2010, Matthew Wilkening of AOL Radio ranked Delvecchio's rap song off the soundtrack, "(It's Time to) Beat Dat Beat", as the #1 Worst Song Ever on the list of the 100 Worst Songs Ever; as a bonus, Wilkening used Delvecchio's quote as the reason for the #1 list: "Being a guido's a way of life. I don't represent all Italians, I represent myself. I started this whole GTL shit (Gym, Tan, Laundry). You have to stay fresh to death."

1. Enrique Iglesias – "I Like It" (feat. Pitbull)
2. Taio Cruz – "Break Your Heart" (Mixin Marc and Tony Svejda Edit) (feat. Ludacris)
3. L.M.F.A.O. – "Get Crazy"
4. Lil Jon – "Hey" (feat. 3OH!3)
5. Deadmau5 – "Ghosts N Stuff" (feat. Rob Swire)
6. David Guetta & Chris Willis – "Gettin' Over You" (feat. Fergie & L.M.F.A.O.)
7. Steve Aoki – "I'm in the House" (feat. Zuper Blahq)
8. Tiësto vs. Diplo – "Come On"
9. Paul Oakenfold – "Pump It Up"
10. Richard Vission & Static Revenger starring Luciana – "I Like That"
11. Kid Sister – "Look Out Weekend" (feat. Nina Sky)
12. Girlicious – "Drank"
13. Lil Jon – "Work It Out" (feat. Pitbull)
14. Midi Mafia – "Last Call"
15. Die Atzen – "Disco Pogo"
16. DJ Pauly D – "Beat Dat Beat (It's Time To)" featuring Jaylyn Ducati

A quote book titled Gym, Tanning, Laundry: The Official Jersey Shore Quote Book (ISBN 978-1-4391-9682-3) was released by MTV on June 15, 2010. The book also includes a bonus DVD with the most memorable moments from season one of the show. A sticker book titled Jersey Shore Sticker Activity Book (ISBN 0-7666-3904-5) was also released on the same date, as well as a 2011 wall calendar (ISBN 0-7407-9797-2) by Andrews McMeel Publishing.

=== Other merchandise and appearances ===
Other merchandise relating to the show have also been released, including talking bobblehead dolls of the cast, a beach game set, Halloween costumes, a "Gym Tanning Laundry (GTL)"-labeled sports bottle, "The Situation - Official App" for iPhone, as well as various T-shirts.

The cast of Jersey Shore appeared on the 2010 MTV Video Music Awards on September 12, 2010. Nicole Polizzi appeared on TLC's Cake Boss episode "Snookie, Super Anthony & a Ship" on November 8, 2010, in which she orders a cake for her mother. Polizzi also appeared on the March 14, 2011 edition of WWE Raw as the guest host and she wrestled a professional wrestling match on April 4, 2011, at WrestleMania XXVII. Jennifer Farley and Angelina Pivarnick appeared on various episodes of TNA Impact in 2011. The cast of Jersey Shore appears on MTV's Season 4 of Disaster Date, starring Jen Lilley, Lauren Zima, Cale Hartmann, Jason Karasev, Russell Pitts, Hasan Minhaj, Diarra Kilpatrick, and Kara Luiz. Angelina Pivarnick appeared in the show NY Ink in which she got a tattoo that shows her time in Jersey Shore.

== Controversy and criticism ==
University of Chicago and the University of Oklahoma are among the educational institutions that have had classes or conferences about the show. In 2010, the cast of Jersey Shore were named on Barbara Walters' 10 Most Fascinating People list, and the series has since been exported to dozens of countries worldwide.

In 2010, MTV received criticism from Italian American organizations for the way in which they marketed the show, as it liberally used the word Guido to describe the cast members. The term "guido" is generally regarded as an ethnic slur when referring to Italians and Italian Americans. One promotion stated that the show was to follow "eight of the hottest, tannest, craziest Guidos", while yet another advertisement stated that "[the show] exposes one of the tri-state area's most misunderstood species ... the GUIDO. Yes, they really do exist! Our Guidos and Guidettes will move into the ultimate beach house rental and indulge in everything the Seaside Heights, New Jersey scene has to offer."

Cast members Snooki and JWoww are not ethnically Italian. Snooki is Chilean, but was adopted as an infant by Italian American parents. Jwoww is of Irish and Spanish descent. Ronnie, Sammi, and Angelina are only of partial Italian descent: Ronnie is part Puerto Rican, Sammi is part Greek, and Angelina is part Polish.

Prior to the series debut, UNICO National formally requested that MTV cancel the show. In a letter to the network, UNICO called the show a "... direct, deliberate and disgraceful attack on Italian Americans ..." UNICO National President Andre DiMino said in a statement "MTV has festooned the 'bordello-like' house set with Italian flags and green, white and red maps of New Jersey while every other cutaway shot is of Italian signs and symbols. They are blatantly as well as subliminally bashing Italian-Americans with every technique possible ..." Around this time, other Italian-American organizations joined the fight, including the National Italian American Foundation, the Order Sons of Italy in America and the internet watch-dog ItalianAware.

MTV responded to the controversy by issuing a press release which stated in part, "the Italian-American cast takes pride in their ethnicity. We understand that this show is not intended for every audience and depicts just one aspect of youth culture." Since the calls for the show's removal, several sponsors have requested that their ads not be aired during the show. These sponsors include Dell, Domino's and American Family Insurance.

=== Governor Christie and the series' portrayal of New Jersey ===
In a February 2010 interview, New Jersey Governor Chris Christie called the show "negative for New Jersey" because most of the cast members are not from the state. According to Christie, the program "takes a bunch of New Yorkers and drops them at the Jersey Shore and tries to make America feel like this is the real New Jersey". Governor Christie took action against the series by trying to encourage people to experience the real Jersey Shore for themselves rather than watch it through MTV: "I can tell people: They want to know what New Jersey really is? I welcome them to come to New Jersey any time." A Fairleigh Dickinson University PublicMind poll released in February 2010 showed that 59% of Americans who had seen the show had a favorable view of New Jersey compared to only 44% of those that had not seen the show. The FDU poll repeated the national telephone survey in 2011 and showed similar results. Consequently, poll director Peter Woolley concluded that "These measures ... suggest the show isn't hurting the nation's view of the state. In fact, it may be promoting one of the state's best features—not Snooki, but the shore itself."

Nonetheless, in September 2011, Governor Christie vetoed a $420,000 tax incentive awarded to the show by the New Jersey Economic Development Authority, stating: "As chief executive, I am duty-bound to ensure that taxpayers are not footing a $420,000 bill for a project which does nothing more than perpetuate misconceptions about the state and its citizens."

== Reception ==
=== Ratings ===
Season	Timeslot (ET)	No of Episodes	Premiere		Finale		TV season
Season	Timeslot (ET)	No of Episodes	Date	Viewers (in million)	Date	Viewers (in million)	TV season
1	Thursday 10:00 pm	9	December 3, 2009	1.38	January 21, 2010	4.83	2009–10
2	Thursday 10:00 pm	13	July 29, 2010	5.25	October 21, 2010	6.07	2010
3	Thursday 10:00 pm	13	January 6, 2011	8.45	March 24, 2011	7.61	2011
4	Thursday 10:00 pm	12	August 4, 2011	8.78	October 20, 2011	6.63	2011
5	Thursday 10:00 pm	11	January 5, 2012	7.60	March 15, 2012	4.99	2012
6	Thursday 10:00 pm	13	October 4, 2012	4.69	December 20, 2012	3.13	2012

=== Cast spin-offs ===
On April 7, 2011, MTV announced it had picked up two spin-off shows featuring cast members Nicole, Jenny and Pauly, picking up twelve episodes of each show. One show focuses on Nicole and Jenny living together in their own apartment and is titled Snooki & Jwoww. The other show follows Pauly jet-setting around the country for various DJ gigs and is titled The Pauly D Project. Filming for both shows started at the end of 2011 and premiered in 2012. SallyAnn Salsano of 495 Productions (Jersey Shore) is the executive producer of both spin-offs. The Pauly D Project was canceled after one season, while Snooki & JWoww enjoyed a successful four-season run before ending in 2015.

=== Other iterations ===
In addition to Jersey Shore, there have been twelve similar official versions, including two in the United States (Floribama and Buckhead), two in the United Kingdom (Geordie and The Valleys), one each in Germany, Brazil, Poland, Spain, Mexico, as well as an international crossover between the coasts of the last two mentioned countries, titled Super Shore, also an international version called All Star Shore. In February 2022, seven new iterations of the franchise were announced to premiere on Paramount+ around the world, including Australia.

Title	Location	Original Channel	Premiere date	# of Seasons	Ref
Geordie Shore	Newcastle, England	MTV	May 24, 2011	26	
Каникулы в Мексике	Pto Vallarta, Mexico	MTV/ Pyatnica!	September 5, 2011	2	
The Valleys	Cardiff, Wales	MTV	25 September 2012	3	
Gandía Shore	Gandia, Spain	MTV	October 14, 2012	1	
Warsaw Shore	Warsaw, Poland	MTV Poland	November 10, 2013	21	
Acapulco Shore	Acapulco, Mexico	MTV	September 27, 2014	11	
Super Shore	Mediterranean Europe	MTV (Spain & Latin America)	February 2, 2016	3	
Floribama Shore	Panama City Beach, USA	MTV	November 27, 2017	4	
Rio Shore	Rio de Janeiro, Brazil	MTV & Paramount+	September 30, 2021	4	
Germany Shore	Crete, Greece	MTV & Paramount+	November 17, 2021	6	
Buckhead Shore	Buckhead, USA	MTV	June 23, 2022	1	
All Star Shore	Gran Canaria, Spain	Paramount+	June 29, 2022	2	
Frenchie Shore	Hérault, France	Paramount+ & MTV	November 11, 2023	3	
Italia Shore	Lazio, Italy	Paramount+ & MTV	March 4, 2024	3	
Aussie Shore	Cairns, Australia	Paramount+	October 3, 2024	3	
Canada Shore	Kelowna, Canada	Paramount+	January 22, 2026	1	
Mazatlán Shore	Mazatlán, Mexico	Paramount+	April 21, 2026	1	

Numerous pilots were planned by various unrelated production companies focused on groups of friends in other locations or of specific ethnicities.
