= Sammi Giancola =

American television personality

- Born: Samantha Rae Giancola; March 14, 1987 (age 39); Hazlet, New Jersey, U.S.
- Other name: Sammi Sweetheart
- Education: William Paterson University (BA)
- Years active: 2009–present
- Known for: Jersey Shore
- Spouse: Justin May (m. 2025)
- Partner: Ronnie Ortiz-Magro (2009–2016)
- Children: 1

Samantha Rae May (née Giancola; born March 14, 1987), also known by her nickname Sammi Sweetheart, is an American reality television personality. She is best known for starring in the MTV reality series Jersey Shore from 2009 to 2026.

== Early life ==
Samantha May
Personal information
- Height: 5 ft 6 in (1.68 m)
- Position: Midfielder

Youth career
- 2001–2005: Raritan Rockets

College career
| Years | Team | Apps | (Gls) |
| 2005–2009 | William Paterson Pioneers | 70 | (2) |

Giancola was born March 14, 1987, and raised in Hazlet, New Jersey, Giancola is of Italian and Greek descent. She attended Raritan High School from 2001 to 2005, where she played softball, ran track, and was a four-year varsity soccer letter winner. Giancola won art contests when she was younger.

She went on to major in sociology at William Paterson University, where she played as a midfielder on their Division III women's soccer team.

== Jersey Shore ==
Giancola debuted on the MTV reality show Jersey Shore in August 2009 as Sammi "Sweetheart", a nickname she was known by in her hometown. She remained a main cast member until the shows sixth and final season in 2012. She made subsequent appearances with her cast mates on Silent Library, The Tonight Show with Jay Leno, The Ellen DeGeneres Show, The Wendy Williams Show, and Live with Regis and Kelly.

Giancola and her Jersey Shore co-stars appeared in the 2012 film The Three Stooges. She later appeared on some episodes of Snooki & Jwoww and participated in the 2017 E! special Reunion Road Trip: Return to the Jersey Shore. In a promotional shoot for Jersey Shore, she would famously say "I'm the sweetest bitch you'll ever meet".

In 2018, amidst MTV's announcement of the Jersey Shore reboot, Jersey Shore: Family Vacation, Giancola announced she would not be returning to the show in order to avoid "potentially toxic situations" and to focus on her "businesses and relationship." In March 2023, it was announced Giancola would appear on the show's sixth season. She remained on the show until the eighth and final season.

== Other ventures ==
In 2011, Giancola became the face of the Dangerous fragrance, available for both men and women. She later endorsed another fragrance, Dangerous Desires. In 2012, she launched her fitness clothing line, Sexy Sweetheart, with Hoboken based company, SXE Fitness.

In 2013, Giancola launched her online clothing and accessories line, Sweetheart Styles.

From August 2015 to November 2017, Giancola became a co-host on the Just Sayin podcast alongside relationship expert Siggy Flicker and television host Clare Galterio.

In May 2021, she opened her boutique, Sweetheart Coast, located on the Ocean City, New Jersey boardwalk. in April 2025, Giancola announced she would open a second boutique location at the Ocean Casino Resort in Atlantic City, New Jersey; it opened in July 2025.

== Personal life ==
From 2009 to 2014, Giancola was in an on-and-off relationship with Jersey Shore castmate Ronnie Ortiz-Magro, before ultimately breaking up in 2014.

In 2017, Giancola started dating YouTuber and entrepreneur Christian Biscardi. The pair got engaged on March 5, 2019. Initially planning to wed in 2020, the COVID-19 pandemic upended their plans. Giancola confirmed their separation via her social media in July 2021.

On August 1, 2021, Giancola started dating bartender Justin May. The couple got engaged on March 16, 2024. On February 23, 2025, Giancola and May announced they were expecting their first child together after years of infertility and a miscarriage in 2024. On August 20, 2025, she gave birth to their son, Vincent Keith. The two married on December 4, 2025.

== Filmography ==
=== Film ===
| Year | Production | Role | Notes |
|---|---|---|---|
| 2012 | The Three Stooges | Sammi | as Samantha Giancola |
| TBD | Here Without You | Patty | Pre-production |

=== Television ===
| Year | Production | Role | Notes |
|---|---|---|---|
| 2009–2012 | Jersey Shore | Herself | Main cast member |
| 2010 | When I Was 17 | Herself | Guest |
| 2011 | Silent Library | Herself | Episode "Jersey Shore" |
| 2012–2014 | Snooki & Jwoww | Herself | 8 episodes |
| 2013 | Makeover Manor | Herself | Guest |
| 2013 | Project Runway | Herself | Guest |
| 2023–2026 | Jersey Shore: Family Vacation | Herself | Main cast (Seasons 6–8) |
