= Ronnie Ortiz-Magro =

American reality television personality (born 1985)

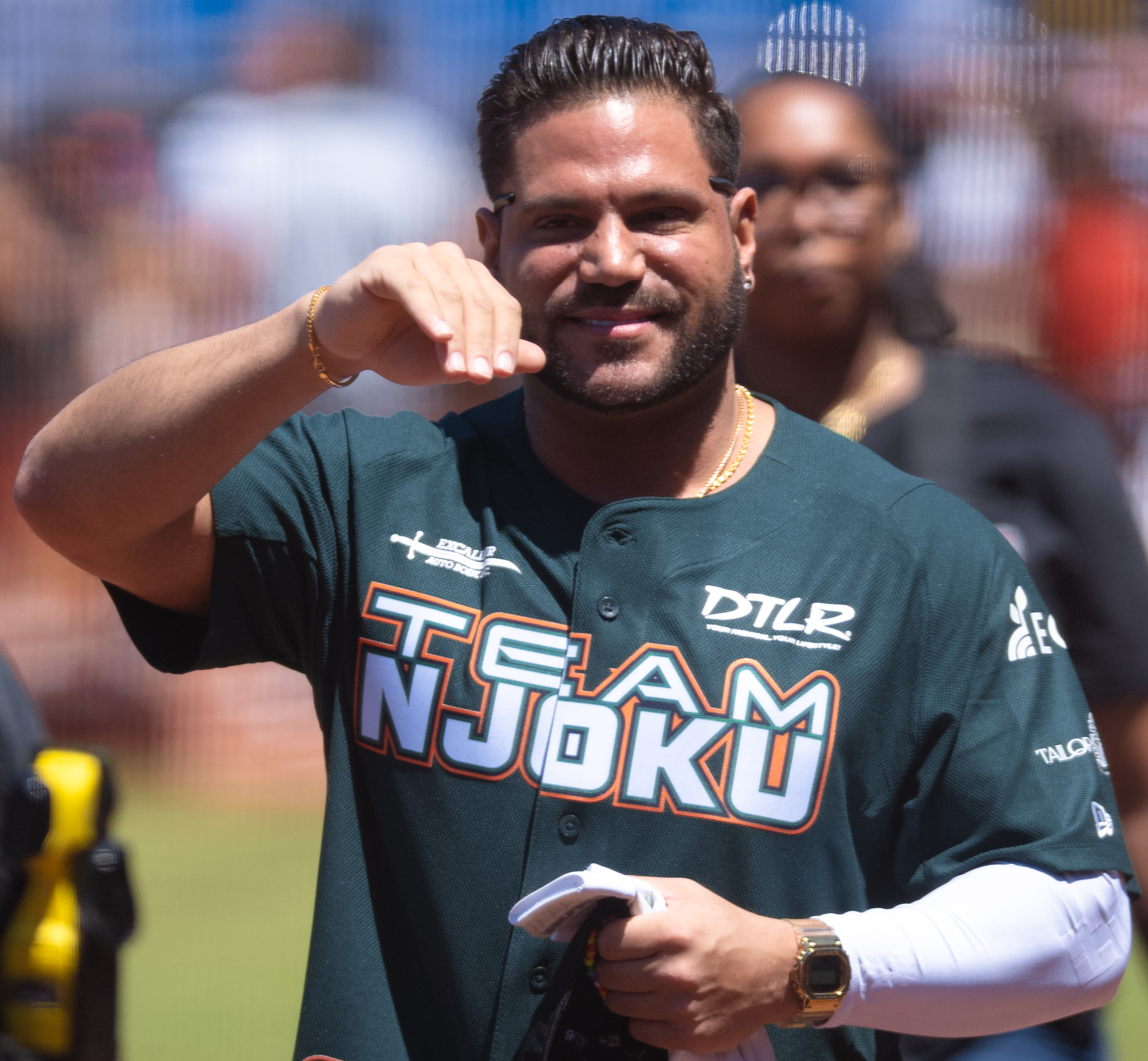
- Ortiz-Magro in 2024
- Born: Ronald J. Ortiz-Magro Jr. December 4, 1985 (age 40); New York City, U.S.
- Occupation: Television personality
- Years active: 2009–present
- Known for: Jersey Shore; Jersey Shore: Family Vacation
- Partner(s): Sammi Giancola (2009–2016); Jen Harley (2017–2019); Saffire Matos (2020–2022)
- Children: 1

Ronald J. Ortiz-Magro Jr. (born December 4, 1985) is an American reality television personality. Ortiz-Magro is best known for being one of the nine main cast members of the MTV reality television series Jersey Shore (2009–2012) and its spin-off Jersey Shore: Family Vacation.

== Early life ==
Ortiz-Magro was born in the Bronx in New York City. He is of Puerto Rican and Italian descent.

== Career ==
Ortiz-Magro worked in real estate for his father before becoming part of MTV's reality show Jersey Shore in August 2009. The show premiered on December 4, 2009, and ran for six seasons before ending in 2012.

Ortiz-Magro made an appearance at TNA Wrestling's Impact Wrestling on October 26, 2011, in Macon, Georgia. The first episode, which aired November 3 of that year, saw Ortiz-Magro and Eric Young get beaten down by Robbie E and Rob Terry, which built to a tag team match the following week, where Ortiz-Magro pinned Robbie E for the win.

Ortiz-Magro and his Jersey Shore co-stars appeared in the 2012 film The Three Stooges. He has also appeared in Xenadrine ads.

In 2017, Ortiz-Magro appeared in the second season of the E! reality series Famously Single.

In 2018, he became part of the main cast in the MTV reality television series Jersey Shore: Family Vacation. On May 13, 2021, Ortiz-Magro announced that he was stepping back from the show to focus on his mental health.

On April 11, 2018, he appeared in the seventh episode of the third season of Hollywood Medium with Tyler Henry.

Ortiz-Magro also participated in Celebrity Fear Factor in 2018.

In 2023, Ortiz-Magro made a guest appearance during the sixth season of Jersey Shore: Family Vacation, making amends with former castmates following a two-year hiatus. He subsequently rejoined the cast in a recurring role for the show's seventh season in 2024.

== Personal life ==
Ortiz-Magro was in an on-off relationship with his Jersey Shore co-star Sammi Giancola from 2009 to 2016. The couple split up in May 2016.

On December 26, 2017, he announced that he and his girlfriend, Jen Harley, were expecting a baby girl. Their daughter, Ariana Sky Magro, was born in April 2018. In late April 2018, it was reported Ortiz-Magro and Harley had ended their relationship. In January 2019, he entered a month-long rehabilitation program for alcohol and depression. In June 2018 and May 2019, Harley, who has made a career as a realtor and also appeared on Jersey Shore when she was romantically involved with Ortiz-Magro, would be arrested following physical altercations she had with Ortiz-Magro when he visited her in Las Vegas. In February 2019, Ortiz-Magro and Harley had developed what Us Weekly characterized as an "on-off" relationship. However, it was later revealed that Ortiz-Magro had filed a police report alleging Harley had given him physical injuries after domestically assaulting him in January 2019, a few days after a reported altercation at a New Year's Eve Party. On October 4, 2019, Ortiz-Magro was arrested in Los Angeles and charged with felony domestic violence after a physical altercation with Harley.

In November 2020, it was revealed that Ortiz-Magro had started a new relationship with Saffire Matos, whom he met in February. On April 22, 2021, Ortiz-Magro was arrested in Los Angeles, on new felony domestic violence charges. At the time of this arrest, Ortiz-Magro was on probation due to his October 2019 domestic violence incident. In June 2021, Ortiz-Magro and Matos became engaged. Around June 2022, Ortiz-Magro called off his engagement with Saffire but continues to focus on his mental health and his daughter.

In March 2023, Ortiz-Magro revealed during an episode of Jersey Shore: Family Vacation that he had been granted full custody of his daughter Ariana and relocated to Miami, Florida, to open a sneaker retail business, Sneaker Clinic.
