= List of programs broadcast by MTV =

MTV is an American cable television channel, founded in 1981. The network was originally dedicated to music, the music industry and music history. The organization, MTV Networks, has since produced and/or distributed many television shows, most of which are of genres unrelated to music. This is a list of most of the programs MTV has aired in its lifetime.

== Current programming ==
=== Reality shows ===
Title	Premiere date	Current season	Source(s)
RuPaul's Drag Race: Untucked	January 6, 2023	17	(Note: Originally premiered on VH1.)
Caught in the Act: Unfaithful	May 2, 2023	3	

=== Competitive shows ===
Title	Premiere date	Current season	Source(s)
RuPaul's Drag Race	January 6, 2023	18	

=== Music shows ===
- MTV Unplugged (since 1989)
- Fresh Out Playlist (since 2020)

=== Acquired programming ===
- The Big Bang Theory (since 2025)
- The Office (since 2021)
- Parks and Recreation (since 2026)

== Former programming ==
=== Music shows ===
- MTV Saturday Night Concert (1981–1987)
- Friday Night Video Fights (1982–1986)
- I.R.S. Records Presents The Cutting Edge (1983–1987)
- MTV Top 20 Video Countdown (1984–1998)
- Heavy Metal Mania (1985–1986)
- New Video Hour (1985–1988)
- 120 Minutes (1986–2000, moved to MTV2)
- Dial MTV (1986–1991)
- Friday Night Party Zone (1986–1987)
- International Hour (1986–1987)
- Metal Shop (1986)
- Metal Music Half Hour (1986–1987)
- Closet Classics Capsule (1987–1988)
- Headbangers Ball (1987–1995)
- Club MTV (1987–1992)
- Friday Night Rock Blocks (1987–1990)
- Yo! MTV Raps (1988–1995)
- Post-Modern MTV (1988–1992)
- Deja Video (1989)
- Classic MTV (1989, 1992–93)
- Yo! MTV Raps Today (1989–1992)
- Hard 30: MTV's Headbangers Half Hour (1989)
- Just Say Julie (1989–1992)
- Awake on the Wild Side (1990–1992)
- Martha's Greatest Hits (1990)
- MTV Prime (1990–91)
- Master Mix (1990)
- Street Party (1990–1992)
- Earth to MTV (1990–1992)
- MTV's All Request (1990–91)
- Beach MTV (1990–97)
- The Hot Seat (1990–91)
- Top 10 at 10 (1990–91)
- Bootleg MTV (1991)
- Power Pack (1991)
- MTV's Most Wanted (1991–1996)
- Buzz Block (1991)
- Fade to Black (1991–92)
- Buzzcut (1992)
- Countdown to the Ball (1992–93)
- Hangin' with MTV (1992)
- Flashback (1992)
- Weekend Blast-Off (1992–93)
- MTV's Rude Awakening (1992–1997)
- Stopless Hits (1992–93)
- Alternative Nation (1992–1997)
- MTV Jams (1992–1997; 2000-2001)
- The Grind (1992–1997)
- MTV Rocks (1992–93)
- MTV Blocks (1992–1995)
- MTV Prime Time (1992–1997)
- MTV Dreamtime (1992–1997)
- MTV Jams Countdown (1993–2000)
- Rock Videos That Don't Suck (1993–94)
- Daily Dose (1994)
- Most Wanted Jams (1994–97)
- Superock (1995–96)
- Best of the 90s (1995–96)
- Yo! (1996–1999)
- M2 on MTV (1996–1998)
- Amp (1996–2001)
- The Crack of MTV (1997)
- Popular Videos People Prefer (1997)
- After Hours (1997–2007)
- Adult Videos (1997)
- Pinfield Suite (1997)
- Authentic Reproduction (1997)
- Dawn Patrol (1997–2000)
- MTV Probe (1997)
- Countdown to the 10 Spot (1997)
- Mattrock (1997–98)
- 12 Angry Viewers (1997–98)
- Indie Outing (1997–98)
- Live From the 10 Spot (1997–98)
- MTV Live (1997–1998)
- All-Time Top 10 Videos (1997–98)
- Artist Cut (1998–99)
- Say What? (1998–99)
- The Daily Burn (1998)
- Total Request (1998)
- Pinfield Presents (1998)
- Lunch with Jesse (1998)
- Eye Spy Video (1998–99)
- Total Request Live (1998–2008; 2017–2018)
- MTV Rocks Off (1998–99)
- Revue (1998–99)
- Pleasure Chest (1998–99)
- Video Cliches (1999)
- Spankin' New Music (1999–2000)
- Hot Zone (1999–2001)
- Global Groove (1999)
- Isle of MTV Fantasies (1999)
- Beat Suite (1999–2000)
- Making the Video (1999–2009)
- TRL Wannabes (1999–2000)
- The Return of the Rock (1999–2001)
- Direct Effect (2000–2006)
- MTV Video Wake-Up (2000–2008)
- MTV's Rock/d (2000)
- Senseless Acts of Video (2000-01)
- Carmen's Hypermix (2001)
- Live at the Rock and Roll Hall of Fame (2001–02)
- Señor Moby's House of Music (2002)
- MTV Soul (2002)
- Prime Time Players (2002–2004)
- All Things Rock Countdown (2002–2005)
- Beat Seekers (2002)
- Album Launch (2002–03)
- MTV Hits (2002–2006)
- Advance Warning (2003–2005)
- Video Clash (2003–2005)
- Hard Rock Live (2003–2005)
- Weekend Dime (2005)
- A.D.D. Videos (2006)
- The Big Ten (2006–2008)
- Sucker Free (2006–2008)
- MTV Live (2007)
- 45th at Night (2007)
- FNMTV (2008–09)
- FNMTV Premieres (2008–09)
- AMTV (2009–2017)
- MTV First (2011–2014)
- Hip Hop POV (2012)
- Wonderland (2016)
- TRL Top 10 (2019)

=== News and documentary shows ===
- Liner Notes (1982–1986)
- Profiles in Rock (1982)
- Fast Forward (1983)
- The Week in Rock (1987–1997)
- Now Hear This (1988–89)
- The Big Picture (1988–1993)
- House of Style (1989–2000)
- Rockumentary (1989–1997)
- MTV News at Night (1989–90)
- Buzz (1990)
- Famous Last Words with Kurt Loder (1990–91)
- Sex in the '80s (1990)
- This is Horror (1990)
- The Day in Rock (1991–92)
- Like We Care (1991–92)
- MTV Sports (1992–97)
- Sex in the '90s (1992–1994)
- MTV News Raw (1995–1997)
- UNfiltered (1995)
- MTV Mega-Dose (1995–1997)
- alt.film at MTV (1996–1998)
- BIOrhythm (1998–2000)
- MTV News 1515 (1998–2000)
- True Life (1998–2017)
- Ultrasound (1998–2002)
- Rockumentary Remix (1998)
- MTV News Link (1999–2000)
- Diary (2000–2014)
- MTV News Now (2000–2005)
- Breaking It Down with Serena (2000–2002)
- The Lowdown (2000-01)
- Bangin' the Charts (2001–2002)
- Fight for Your Rights: Criminal (2001)
- Sex 2K (2001–2004)
- Chart Attack (2002)
- ET on MTV (2002–2007)
- Movie House (2002–2004)
- The Assignment with Iann Robinson (2002–03)
- Big Urban Myth Show (2002–2004)
- Making the Game (2002–2005)
- All Eyes On (2003–2008)
- Never Before Scene (2004–05)
- My Block (2005–2007)
- Trippin' (2005)
- Britney: For the Record (2008)
- Detox (2009)
- How's Your News? (2009)
- Nicki Minaj: My Time Now (2010)
- 10 on Top (2010–2013)
- Lady Gaga: Inside the Outside (2011)
- This Is How I Made It (2012–2013)
- Miley: The Movement (2013)
- Nicki Minaj: My Time Again (2015)
- Unlocking the Truth (2016)
- Dare to Live (2017)
- True Life/Now (2019)
- Fresh Out Live (2020–2024, moved to MTV's YouTube channel)
- True Life Crime (2020–2021)
- True Life Presents: Quarantine Stories (2020)
- My Life on MTV (2021)
- The Challenge: Untold History (2022)

=== Reality shows ===
- The Real World (1992–2017, moved to Facebook Watch)
- FANatic (1998–2000)
- House of Style Presents: Mission: Makeover (2000)
- The Road Home (2000–2002)
- Fear (2000–2002)
- Fear Factor (2017-2018; originally aired on NBC from 2001 until 2006 and again from 2011 until 2012, later rebooted on FOX as Fear Factor: House of Fear since 2026)
- WWE Tough Enough (2001–2003, moved to UPN in 2004, later revived by USA Network from 2011 until 2015)
- Becoming (2001)
- Jammed (2001)
- Dismissed (2002–03)
- Flipped (2001–02)
- Vice (2002)
- FM Nation (2002–03)
- Making the Band (2002–2009; moved from ABC {2000-2001})
- Making His Band (2009)
- Sorority Life (2002–03)
- Suspect: True Crime Stories (2002)
- Made (2003–2014)
- Made Presents: Camp Jim (2003)
- Morning After (2003)
- Surf Girls (2003)
- Burned (2003)
- Fraternity Life (2003)
- One Bad Trip (2003)
- Punk'd (2003–2007, 2012)
- Rich Girls (2003)
- Room Raiders (2003–2009)
- TRL Presents MTV's Duets (2003)
- Viva La Bam (2003–2005)
- Wade Robson Project (2003)
- Wildboyz (2003–04, moved to MTV2)
- High School Stories (2004–2006)
- Pimp My Ride (2004–2007)
- I Want a Famous Face (2004–05)
- Battle for Ozzfest (2004–05)
- Faking the Video (2004)
- Laguna Beach: The Real Orange County (2004–2006)
- Homewrecker (2005)
- Miss Seventeen (2005)
- My Super Sweet 16 (2005–2017)
- PoweR Girls (2005)
- The Reality Show (2005)
- Score (2005)
- Trailer Fabulous (2005)
- Trick It Out (2005)
- The Trip (2005)
- 8th & Ocean (2006)
- Call to Greatness (2006)
- Fast Inc. (2006)
- My Own (2006)
- The Hills (2006–2010)
- The Shop (2006)
- Tiara Girls (2006)
- Twentyfourseven (2006)
- Two-A-Days (2006–07)
- Why Can't I Be You? (2006)
- Band in a Bubble (2007)
- Barrio 19 (2007)
- DanceLife (2007)
- Engaged and Underage (2007–08)
- I'm from Rolling Stone (2007)
- Juvies (2007)
- Living Lahaina (2007)
- Maui Fever (2007)
- Newport Harbor: The Real Orange County (2007–08)
- Once Upon a Prom (2007)
- Pageant Place (2007)
- Reunited: The Real World Las Vegas (2007)
- Room 401 (2007)
- Scarred (2007)
- The X Effect (2007–2009)
- Busted (2008)
- Buzzin' (2008)
- Exiled (2008)
- Sex with Mom and Dad (2008–09)
- The City (2008–2010)
- The Paper (2008)
- The Phone (2009)
- College Life (2009)
- Gone Too Far (2009)
- House of Jazmin (2009)
- Is She Really Going Out with Him? (2009)
- Jersey Shore (2009–2012)
- Making His Band (2009)
- 16 and Pregnant (2009–2014; 2020–2021)
- Styl'd (2009–2010)
- Teen Mom OG (2009–2012, 2015–2021)
- Taking the Stage (2009–10)
- Downtown Girls (2010)
- Hired (2010)
- I Used to Be Fat (2010–2014)
- If You Really Knew Me (2010)
- Megadrive (2010)
- My Life as Liz (2010–11)
- The Buried Life (2010)
- The Dudesons in America (2010, moved to MTV2)
- The Vice Guide to Everything (2010)
- World of Jenks (2010–2013)
- When I Was 17 (2010–11)
- Chelsea Settles (2011)
- Cuff'd (2011)
- Extreme Cribs (2011)
- Friendzone (2011–2013)
- Son of a Gun (2011)
- Teen Mom 2 (2011–2022)
- The Electric Barbarellas (2011)
- Caged (2012)
- Catfish: The TV Show (2012–2024)
- WakeBrothers (2012)
- Big Tips Texas (2013)
- Buckwild (2013)
- Generation Cryo (2013)
- Girl, Get Your Mind Right! (2013)
- Scrubbing In (2013)
- Teen Mom 3 (2013)
- The Alectrix (2013)
- Wait Til Next Year (2013)
- Washington Heights (2013)
- Young & Married (2013)
- The Ex and The Why (2014)
- Jerks with Cameras (2014)
- Slednecks (2014)
- Time's Up (2014)
- Virgin Territory (2014)
- Follow the Rules (2015)
- No Rules (2015) (one-time special)
- One Bad Choice (2015)
- Todrick (2015)
- MTV Suspect (2016)
- Floribama Shore (2017–2021)
- Promposal (2017)
- Siesta Key (2017–2023)
- Jersey Shore: Family Vacation (2018-2026)
- Ex on the Beach (2018–2023)
- How Far Is Tattoo Far? (2018–19)
- Pretty Little Mamas (2018)
- Teen Mom: Young and Pregnant (2018–2022)
- Too Stupid to Die (2018)
- Winter Break: Hunter Mountain (2018, moved to MTV2)
- Lindsay Lohan's Beach Club (2019)
- Made in Staten Island (2019)
- Game of Clones (2019)
- Double Shot at Love with DJ Pauly D and Vinny (2019–2021)
- Ghosted: Love Gone Missing (2019–2021)
- The Hills: New Beginnings (2019–2021)
- 16 & Recovering (2020)
- The Busch Family Brewed (2020)
- Families of the Mafia (2020–2021)
- Revenge Prank (2020–2021)
- Buckhead Shore (2022)
- Help! I'm in a Secret Relationship (2022-2025)
- Teen Mom: Family Reunion (2022–2024)
- Teen Mom: The Next Chapter (2022-2025)
- Teen Mom: Girls' Night In (2022)
- The Real Friends of WeHo (2023)
- Love & Hip Hop: Atlanta (2023-2026)
- Love & Hip Hop Atlanta: Run It Back (2023)
- MTV Couples Retreat (2023)
- Caught in the Act: Double Life (2025)

=== Celebrity shows ===
- MTV Cribs (2000–10, 2021-23)
- The Osbournes (2002–2005)
- Newlyweds: Nick and Jessica (2003–2005)
- The Ashlee Simpson Show (2004–05)
- 'Til Death Do Us Part: Carmen and Dave (2004)
- Meet the Barkers (2005–06)
- Movie Life: House of Wax (2005)
- Run's House (2005–2009)
- Cheyenne (2006)
- Rob & Big (2006–2008)
- There & Back (2006)
- Adventures in Hollyhood (2007)
- Bam's Unholy Union (2007)
- Hilary Duff: This Is Now (2007)
- Life of Ryan (2007–2009)
- Taquita + Kaui (2007)
- Daddy's Girls (2009)
- Nitro Circus (2009)
- Rob Dyrdek's Fantasy Factory (2009–2015)
- T.I.'s Road to Redemption (2009)
- Snooki & Jwoww (2012–2015)
- The Pauly D Project (2012)
- Ke$ha: My Crazy Beautiful Life (2013)
- The Surreal Life (2024, moved from VH1)
- The West Coast Hustle (2024)

=== Competitive shows ===
- The MTV Basement Tapes (1983–1988)
- Remote Control (1987–1990)
- Turn It Up! (1990)
- Lip Service (1992–1995)
- Sandblast (1994–1996)
- Trashed (1994)
- Road Rules (1995–2004, 2007)
- Singled Out (1995–1998)
- Idiot Savants (1996–97)
- The Blame Game (1998–2000)
- The Cut (1998)
- The Challenge (1998-2025, moved to Paramount+)
- Say What? Karaoke (1998–2003)
- webRIOT (1999–2000)
- Sisqo's Shakedown (2000)
- Dismissed (2001)
- Sink or Swim (2001)
- Who Knows the Band? (2001–02)
- I Bet You Will (2002)
- Kidnapped (2002)
- Taildaters (2002–03)
- Boiling Points (2003–2008)
- MC Battle (2003–04)
- Who's Got Game? (2003)
- MTV's Prom Date (2004)
- The Assistant (2004)
- Date My Mom (2004–2006)
- Wanna Come In? (2004–05)
- Your Face or Mine? (2004)
- You've Got a Friend (2004)
- Damage Control (2005–06)
- MTV's The 70s House (2005)
- Next (2005–2008)
- Parental Control (2005–2010)
- Exposed (2006–2008)
- Yo Momma (2006–2008)
- Little Talent Show (2006)
- Celebrity Rap Superstar (2007)
- Making Menudo (2007)
- A Shot at Love with Tila Tequila (2007)
- A Shot at Love II with Tila Tequila (2008)
- From G's to Gents (2008–09)
- 50 Cent: The Money and the Power (2008)
- America's Best Dance Crew (2008–2012)
- Bromance (2008–2009)
- A Double Shot at Love (2008–09)
- Legally Blonde: The Musical: The Search for Elle Woods (2008)
- MTV's Top Pop Group (2008)
- Paris Hilton's My New BFF (2008–2010)
- Rock the Cradle (2008)
- That's Amore! (2008)
- Bully Beatdown (2009–10)
- Disaster Date (2009–2011)
- The Girls of Hedsor Hall (2009)
- P. Diddy's Starmaker (2009)
- Silent Library (2009–2011)
- Moving In (2010)
- Ultimate Parkour Challenge (2010)
- The Substitute (2011)
- Money from Strangers (2012–2013)
- Totally Clueless (2012)
- The Hook Up (2013–2014)
- Are You the One? (2014–2019)
- Copycat (2014)
- House of Food (2014)
- Snack-Off (2014)
- Broke Ass Game Show (2015–16)
- The Almost Impossible Game Show (2016)
- 90's House (2017)
- The Challenge: Champs vs. Stars (2017–18)
- Fear Factor (2017–18)
- MTV Undressed (2017)
- Stranded with a Million Dollars (2017)
- Sounds Like a Game Show (2021)
- Becoming a Popstar (2022)
- Love at First Lie (2022)
- All Star Shore (2023, moved from Paramount+)
- The Exhibit: Finding the Next Great Artist (2023)
- The Love Experiment (2023)
- The Challenge: All Stars (2025)

=== Talk shows ===
- Andy Warhol's Fifteen Minutes (1985–1987)
- Mouth to Mouth (1988)
- MTV's Big ---- Show (1989)
- Rockline on MTV (1991–92)
- The Jon Stewart Show (1993–94)
- Loveline (1996–2000)
- The Rodman World Tour (1996–97)
- Squirt TV (1996)
- Oddville, MTV (1997)
- The Carson Daly Show (1998)
- Kathy's So-Called Reality (2001)
- Mandy (2001)
- The New Tom Green Show (2003)
- Man and Wife (2008)
- Dogg After Dark (2009)
- It's On with Alexa Chung (2009)
- The Seven (2010–11)
- Savage U (2012)
- Nikki & Sara Live (2013)
- The Show with Vinny (2013)
- Are You the One? The Aftermatch Live (2014)
- Chatfish (2014–2015)
- Wolf Watch (2014–2015)
- Girl Code Live (2015)
- Middle of the Night Show (2015)

=== Variety shows ===
- Zoo TV (1997)
- Nick Cannon Presents: Wild 'n Out (2005–2019, moved to VH1)
- Ridiculousness (2011–2026)
- Failosophy (2013)
- Amazingness (2017–18)
- SafeWord (2017–2018, moved to VH1)
- Deliciousness (2020–2022)
- Adorableness (2021)
- Messyness (2021–22)

=== Scripted content ===
==== Drama ====
- Catwalk (1994)
- Dead at 21 (1994)
- Undressed (1999–2002)
- Live Through This (2000)
- Spyder Games (2001)
- Carmen: A Hip Hopera (2001) (TV movie)
- Kaya (2007)
- $5 Cover (2009)
- Valemont (2009–10)
- Skins (2011)
- Teen Wolf (2011–2017)
- Finding Carter (2014–15)
- Eye Candy (2015)
- Scream (2015–16, moved to VH1)
- Sweet/Vicious (2016–2017)
- The Shannara Chronicles (2016, moved to Spike TV)
- Binged to Death (2023) (TV movie)

==== Comedy ====
- Al TV (1984–1999)
- 1/2 Hour Comedy Hour (1988–1993)
- Way USA (1988)
- Just Say Julie (1989–1992)
- Kevin Seal, Sporting Fool (1990)
- Pirate TV (1990)
- Totally Pauly (1990–1994, 1996)
- The Ben Stiller Show (1990–91)
- Colin Quinn's Manly World (1990)
- The Idiot Box (1991)
- You Wrote It, You Watch It (1993)
- Comikaze (1993)
- The State (1993–1995)
- Buzzkill (1996)
- Apartment 2F (1997)
- Austin Stories (1997–98)
- The Jenny McCarthy Show (1997)
- The Jim Breuer Show (1998)
- The Sifl and Olly Show (1998–99)
- The Tom Green Show (1999–2000)
- 2gether (2000–01)
- Jackass (2000–2002)
- The Lyricist Lounge Show (2000–01)
- The Andy Dick Show (2001–02)
- Now What? (2002)
- Doggy Fizzle Televizzle (2002–03)
- Scratch and Burn (2002)
- The Andy Milonakis Show (2005, moved to MTV2)
- Blastazoid (2006)
- Blowin' Up (2006)
- The Stew Channel (2006)
- Nick Cannon Presents: Short Circuitz (2007)
- Human Giant (2007–08)
- The Gamekillers (2007)
- Pranked (2009–2012)
- The CollegeHumor Show (2009)
- The Hard Times of RJ Berger (2010–11)
- Warren the Ape (2010)
- Awkward. (2011–2016)
- Death Valley (2011)
- I Just Want My Pants Back (2011–12)
- The Inbetweeners (2012)
- Underemployed (2012)
- Girl Code (2013–2015)
- Zach Stone Is Gonna Be Famous (2013)
- Faking It (2014–2016)
- Happyland (2014)
- Ladylike (2016)
- Loosely Exactly Nicole (2016)
- Mary + Jane (2016)
- Acting Out (2016)

==== Wrestling ====
- WWE Sunday Night Heat (2000–2003, moved to Spike TV)
- Wrestling Society X (2007)

==== Animated ====
- Liquid Television (1991–1995)
- Beavis and Butt-Head (1993–1997; 2011)
- The Brothers Grunt (1994–95)
- The Head (1994–1996)
- The Maxx (1995)
- Æon Flux (1995)
- Cartoon Sushi (1997–98)
- Daria (1997–2002)
- Celebrity Deathmatch (1998–2002, moved to MTV2)
- Super Adventure Team (1998)
- Downtown (1999)
- Station Zero (1999)
- Spy Groove (2000–2002)
- Undergrads (2001)
- 3-South (2002–03)
- Clone High (2003)
- Spider-Man: The New Animated Series (2003)
- DJ & the Fro (2009)
- Popzilla (2009)
- Good Vibes (2011)
- Greatest Party Story Ever (2016)

=== Programming from other Paramount Media Networks ===
==== Comedy Central ====
- Inside Amy Schumer (2015)
- South Park (2009–2022)

==== MTV2 ====
- The Andy Milonakis Show
- Artist Collection
- Celebrity Deathmatch
- Chart2Chart
- Discover & Download
- Final Fu
- Guy Code
- Makes a Video
- MTV2 $2 Bill Concert Series
- MTV2 Soul Countdown
- Sportsblender
- Team Sanchez
- Where My Dogs At?
- Wonder Showzen

==== mtvU ====
- mtvU Woodie Awards (2005–2017)

==== Nickelodeon ====
- The Ren & Stimpy Show (1991–2016)
- Rocko's Modern Life (1994)
- SpongeBob SquarePants (2000–2016)

==== Paramount Network ====
- Lip Sync Battle (2015–2017)

==== Paramount+ ====
- Behind the Music (2023–2024)
- The Family Stallone (2023–2024)
- Hip Hop My House (2023)
- iCarly (2022)
- Sampled (2023)
- Yo! MTV Raps (2023)

==== Showtime ====
- The Chi (2023–2024)
- Couples Therapy (2024)

==== International MTV affiliates ====
- Catfish UK: The TV Show (2022)
- Live 'n' Loud
- Los Premios MTV Latinoamérica (2002–2006)
- MTV Europe Music Awards (1994–present)
- Teen Mum (2017)

=== Acquired programs ===
Title	First aired	Last aired
America's Next Top Model	2005	2008
Beauty and the Geek	2006	2008
The Beatles	1986	1987
Britney and Kevin: Chaotic	2005	
Buffy the Vampire Slayer	2010	
The Comic Strip Presents...	1988	1989
Degrassi: The Next Generation	2008	2014
Fastlane	2002	2003
The Flintstones	1994	
The Fresh Prince of Bel-Air	2014	2015
Friends	2017	2025
Futurama	2009	
George Lopez	2014	2015
Grounded for Life	2009	
How I Met Your Mother	2016	
Life as We Know It	2004	
The Meldrum Tapes	1986	1987
The Monkees	1985	1987
Monty Python's Flying Circus	1987	1990
Music in High Places	2001	2002
My So-Called Life	1995	1998
My Wife and Kids	2014	2015
New Girl	2015	2016
Platinum	2003	
Queen Bees	2008	
Saturday Night Live	1991	
Scrubs	2009	
Speed Racer	1992	1995
That '70s Show	2010	2013
The Partridge Family	1994	
The Tube	1985	1987
Veronica Mars	2004	
The World's Strictest Parents	2009	2010
The Young Ones	1985	1988

== Special events ==
=== Seasonal or annual ===
- MTV's New Year's Eve (1981–2014)
- The Year in Rock (1985–1999)
- MTV Spring Break (1986–2014, 2019)
- Camp MTV (1989)
- MTV Rock N' Jock (1990–2004)
- MTV Beach House (1993–1996, 2003)
- MTV's Ultimate Winter Vacation (1995)
- Fashionably Loud (1996–2003)
- MTV Winter Lodge (1996–1997)
- Motel California (1997)
- Wanna Be a VJ (1998–2000)
- MTV's Summer Share (1998)
- Spankin' New Music Week (1998–2009)
- Snowed In (1999–2001)
- All Access Week (1999–2002)
- Isle of MTV (1999)
- SoCal Summer (2000)
- MTV Icon (2001–2003, moved to MTV2)
- Summer in the Keys (2001)
- MTV's Shore Thing (2002)
- Summer on the Run (2004)
- Summer on the Strip (2005)
- Summer Sizzle (2006)
- MTV's Hottest MCs in the Game (2007–2012)

=== Award shows ===
- MTV Video Music Awards (1984–present)
- MTV Movie & TV Awards (1992–2023)
- MTV Fandom Awards (2014–2016)

=== Public awareness campaigns ===
- Books: Feed Your Head (1991 campaign against aliteracy)
- Choose or Lose (1992, 1996, 2000, 2004, 2008)
- Enough is Enough (1994 anti-violence campaign)
- Fight for Your Right, MTV Think, and MTV Act (1999–present)

== See also ==
- MTV
- List of MTV channels
- List of MTV award shows
- List of MTV VJs
- MTV News
- MTV2
- List of programs broadcast by MTV2
- List of programs broadcast by MTV Classic
