= Karyn Bryant =

American actress, writer, and television personality

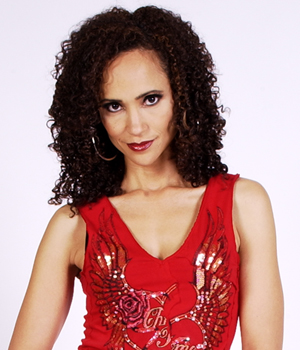
- Occupations: Actress; writer; television personality
- Notable credit(s): CNN anchor, MTV VJ, Showtime Championship Boxing Commentator
- Spouse: Wade Eck (m. 2001; div. 2021)
- Children: 1
- Website: karynbryant.com

Karyn Bryant is an American actress, writer, and television personality.

== Early life ==
Bryant pursued concentrations in political science and sociology at Brown University. She is of Jamaican descent.

== Career ==
Bryant's love of music led to her first television job in 1990, as an MTV VJ. She later hosted a live, daily music program on FX called Sound fX alongside Matt Ostrom and Orlando Jones. Jeff Probst replaced Jones toward the end of the show's run.

Bryant was chosen by TNT to host a series of entertainment vignettes called Rough Cut. The success of the vignettes prompted TNT to turn Rough Cut into a weekly television series hosted and written by Bryant. This marked the beginning of Bryant's professional relationship with Turner Broadcasting. TBS soon launched the wraparound series Movies, For Guys Who Like Movies, allowing Bryant to drive a U.S. Naval LCAC hovercraft, train with Marine snipers and engage in other activities. Lorne Michaels later picked Bryant to host his new daily VH1 game show, Name That Video in 2001; Bryant filmed 50 episodes.

After a brief stint hosting CNN's Talk Back Live, Bryant was chosen to co-anchor CNN's revamped Showbiz Tonight in 2004.

Bryant, a Patriots and Red Sox fan, joined ESPN for their first live New Years Eve show as the countdown to 2006 began. That year, Bryant joined the Showtime Championship Boxing announcer team with Steve Albert, Al Bernstein and Jim Gray. In May 2008, Bryant was invited by CBS to join their Elite Xtreme Combat announcer team for their new primetime mixed martial arts programming, debuting mixed martial arts for the first time on primetime network television May 31, 2008. Bryant also co-owns MMAheat.com which covers most mixed martial arts sporting events. MMA H.E.A.T. (the show) is a half-hour sports and entertainment podcast that Bryant writes and anchors ("H.E.A.T." stands for "Heart. Endurance. Aggression. Technique."). As of the end of 2018 she co-hosted most of the UFC Pre and Post shows on ESPN.

== Personal life ==
Bryant and her ex-husband, Wade, have a daughter.

== TV appearances ==
=== Hosting ===
- Awake on the Wild Side – MTV
- Weekend Blastoff – MTV
- Buzzcut – MTV
- Like We Care – MTV
- Sound FX – FX
- Rough Cut – TNT
- Movies, For Guys Who Like Movies – TBS
- Name That Video – VH1
- Junkyard Wars – TLC
- For Love or Money – Reunion Special – NBC
- Showbiz Tonight (2005) – CNN
- ESPN's New Year's Eve Special, Live From Times Square, New York City (2005) – ESPN
- Showtime Championship Boxing (2006–2009) – Showtime
- Elite Xtreme Combat (2008) – CBS
- Cindy Crawford Meaningful Beauty skin care – infomercial
- MMA H.E.A.T. (2009–present)
- UFC Now

=== Recurring roles ===
- Malcolm and Eddie
- Sliders
