= The Masked Dancer (American TV series) =

American reality competition TV show (2020–2021)

- Genre: Reality competition
- Based on: Masked Singer by Munhwa Broadcasting Corporation
- Directed by: Alex Rudzinski
- Presented by: Craig Robinson
- Starring: Ken Jeong; Paula Abdul; Brian Austin Green; Ashley Tisdale
- Country of origin: United States
- Original language: English
- No. of seasons: 1
- No. of episodes: 9

Production
- Executive producers: James Breen; Craig Plestis; Dan Martin; Ellen DeGeneres
- Production companies: Fox Alternative Entertainment; MBC Entertainment; A Very Good Production; Warner Horizon Unscripted Television

Original release
- Network: Fox
- Release: December 27, 2020 – February 17, 2021

Related
- The Masked Singer

The Masked Dancer is an American reality competition television series that aired on Fox from December 27, 2020, to February 17, 2021. Craig Robinson hosted the show, with Ken Jeong, Paula Abdul, Brian Austin Green, and Ashley Tisdale serving as panelists. Like The Masked Singer's format, celebrity contestants wear head-to-toe costumes and face masks that conceal their identities, but perform solo, with a partner, or with a crew in different dance styles. The show began as a recurring segment on Ellen DeGeneres' daytime talk show which spoofed The Masked Singer. In pre-production since January 2020, filming was delayed until October due to the COVID-19 pandemic in the United States.

== Format ==
=== Panelists and host ===
The Masked Dancer panelists and host

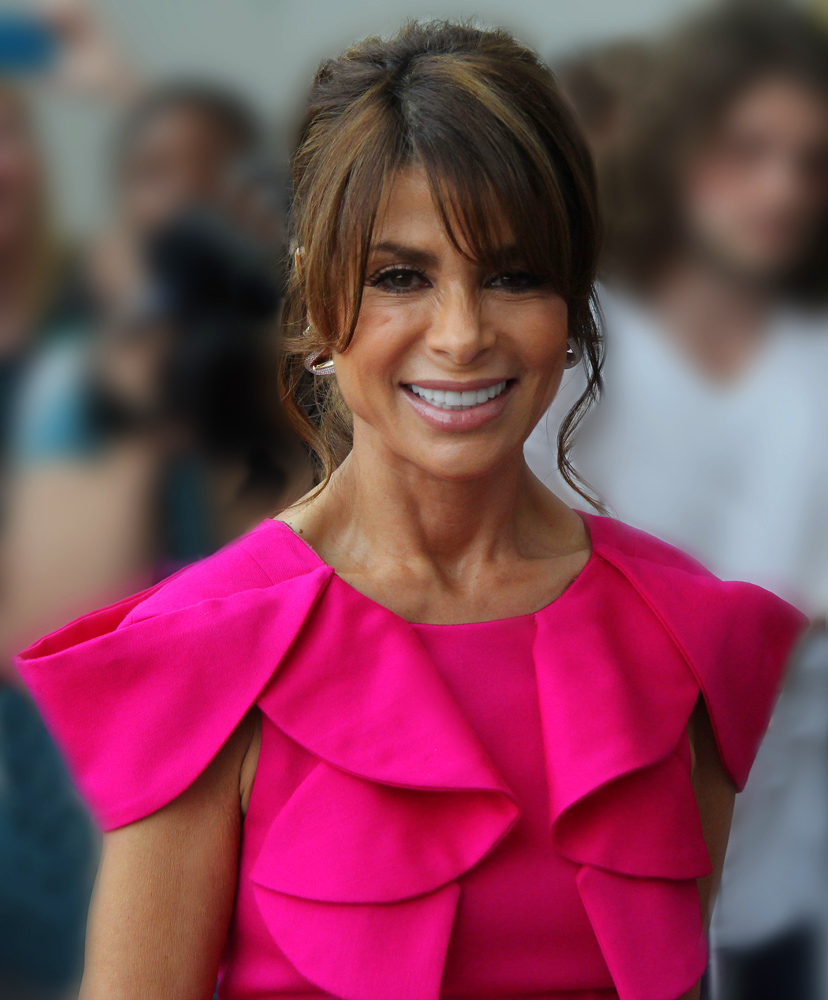
Paula Abdul

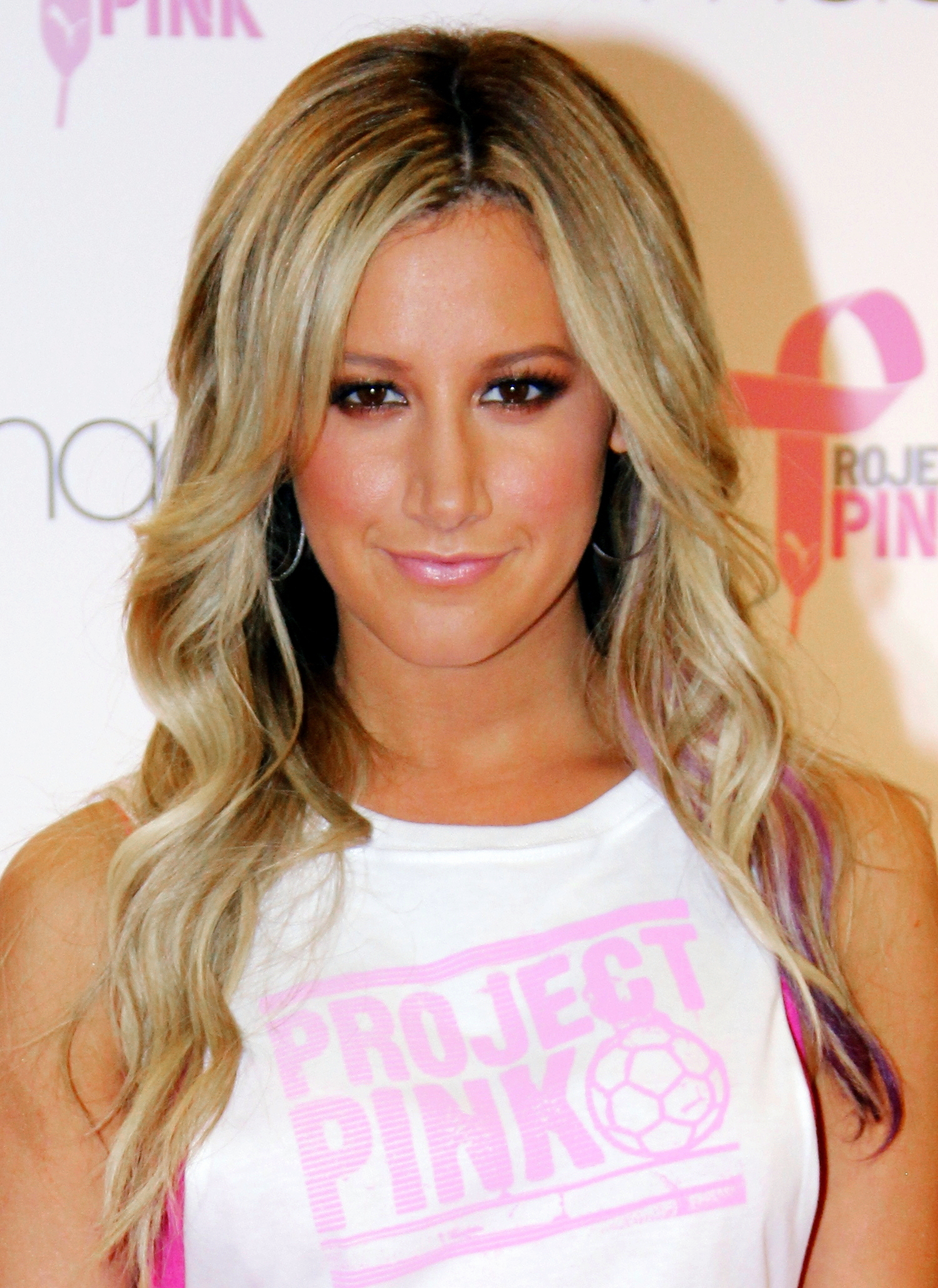
Ashley Tisdale

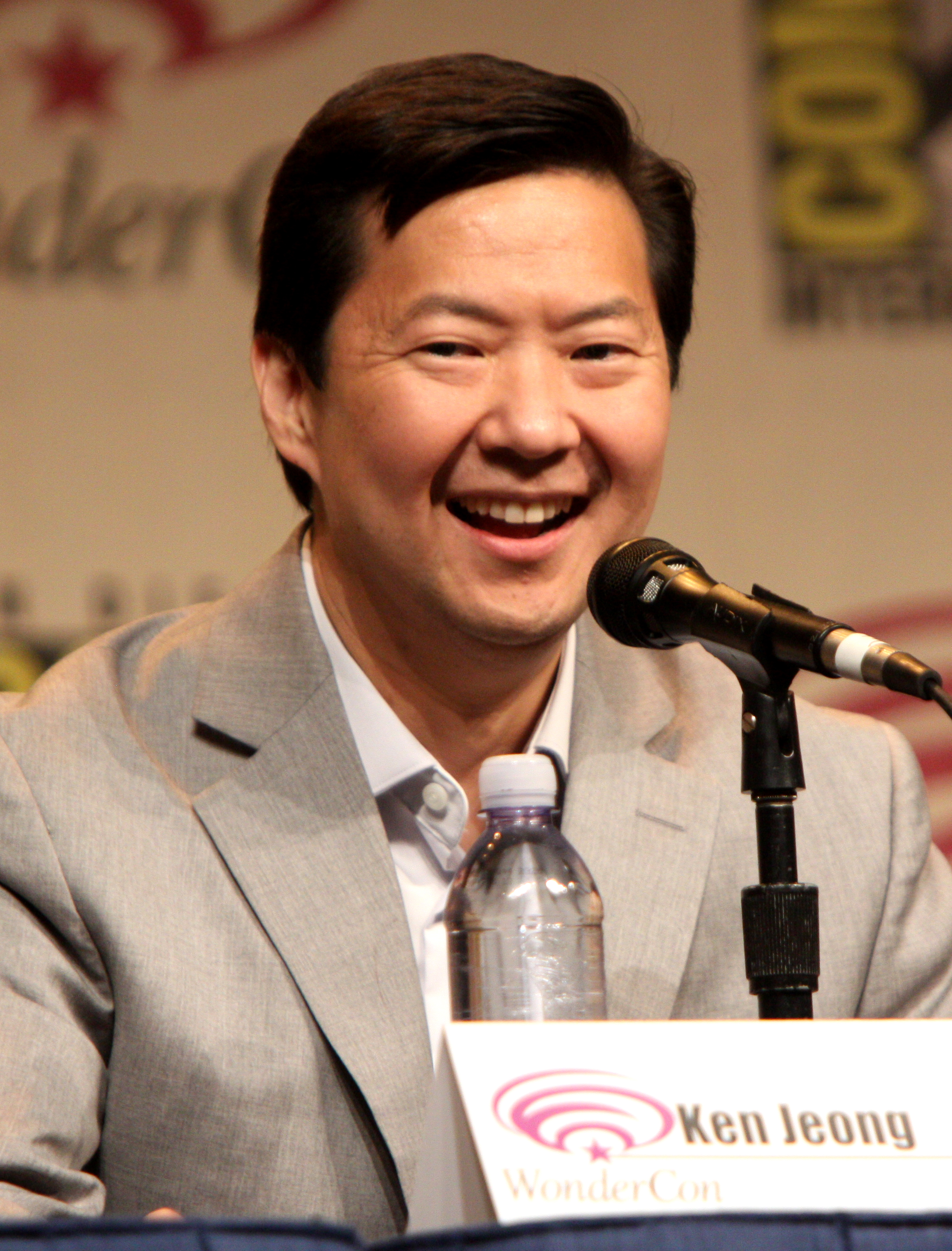
Ken Jeong

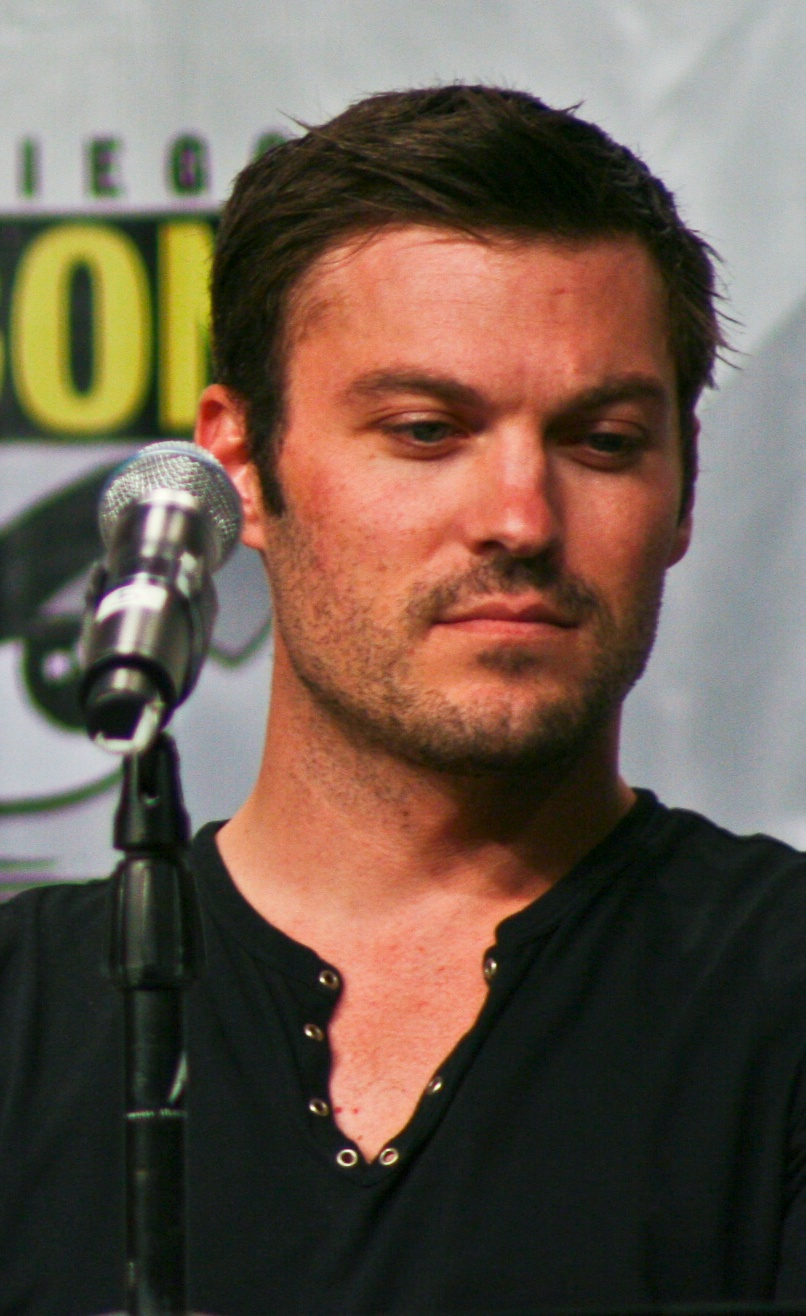
Brian Austin Green

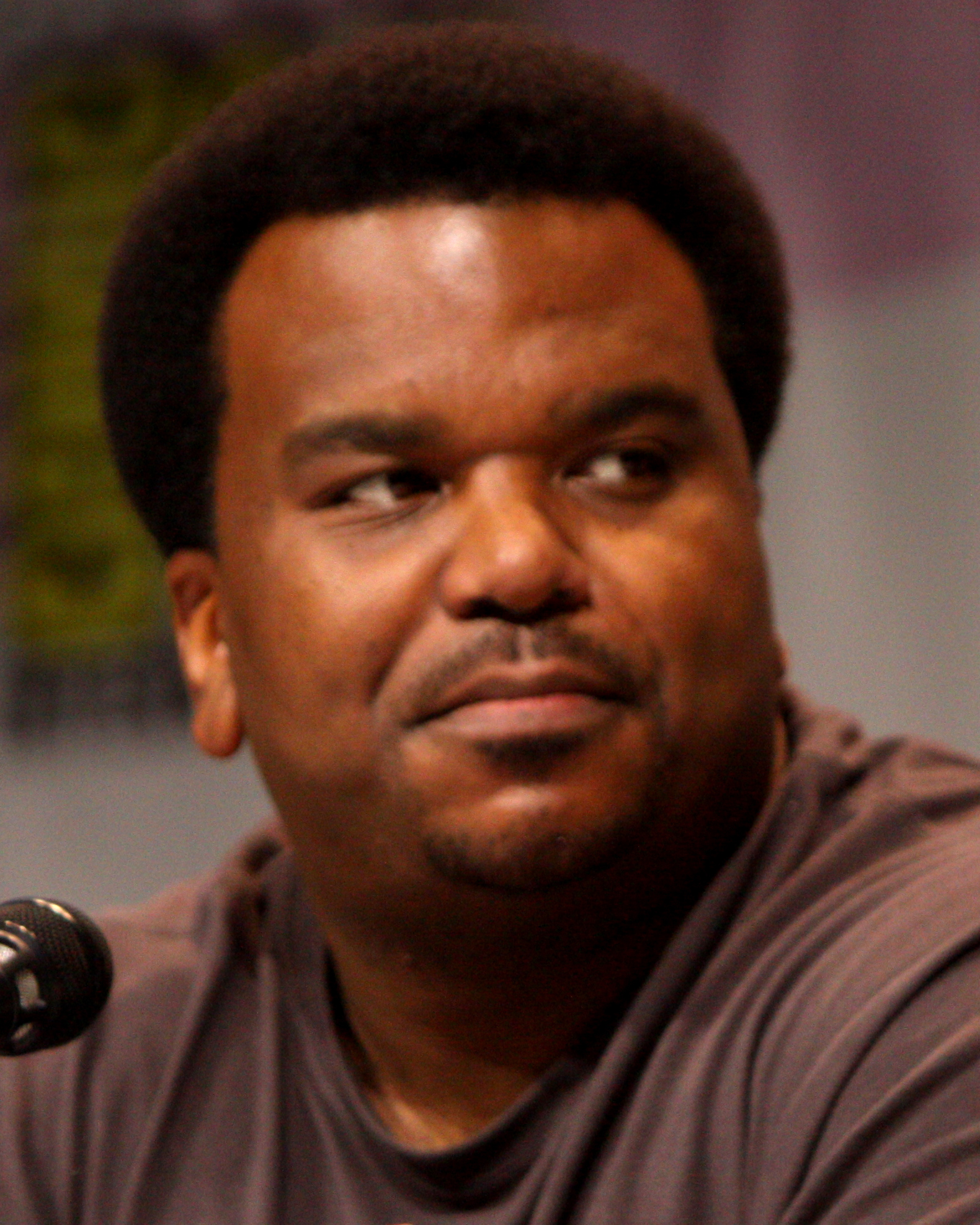
Craig Robinson

Actor and comedian Craig Robinson hosted the show. The Masked Singer panelist and comedian Ken Jeong, entertainer Paula Abdul, actor Brian Austin Green (who performed as "Giraffe" on The Masked Singer's fourth season), and actress and singer Ashley Tisdale served as panelists. Guest panelists included Cheryl Hines in the third episode, Rob Lowe in the fourth episode, Whitney Cummings in the fifth episode, Mayim Bialik in the sixth episode, and Will Arnett in the seventh episode.

== Production ==
=== Background and development ===
The Masked Dancer is a spin-off of The Masked Singer which debuted in January 2019 and became a surprise hit for Fox, averaging about 11.5 million viewers per episode in its first season. The show continued as the highest-rated non-sports program in the United States during its next two seasons. The series involves celebrities who are disguised in full costumes and face masks which conceal their identities. After performing a song, a panel attempts to guess their identities using clues given. After all have performed in an episode, the panelists and the audience vote for the favorite, and the least popular must take off their mask to reveal their identity. It is a derivative of the Masked Singer format which originated in South Korea.

Within a week of The Masked Singer's premiere, Ellen DeGeneres introduced a spoof segment, "The Masked Dancer", on her eponymous talk show. Segments featured disguised celebrities Sean Hayes, Howie Mandel, Colton Underwood, and Derek Hough. Masked Singer panelists Ken Jeong and Nicole Scherzinger participated in later segments, as did the show's host, Nick Cannon. The day after the first segment aired, Rob Wade, head of alternative entertainment and specials at Fox, contacted The Ellen DeGeneres Show producers about a possible television series. Wade said the network could have proceeded without DeGeneres' involvement, but felt she was "passionate about it ... [and] has great access to celebrities". The Masked Dancer was announced in January 2020 as a "straight-to-series" addition at Fox's winter Television Critics Association press tour. It is a co-production of Fox Alternative Entertainment and Warner Brothers Unscripted & Alternative Television.

=== Filming ===
Production filmed in Los Angeles at Red Studios where The Masked Singer has also filmed. As of January 2020, they had started casting the show. Some of the show challenges for the production is how the dancing is to be presented, as a solo, like The Masked Singer, in duets, which is more traditional for dancing competitions, and in group numbers, or a combination. Additionally, they accepted that the contestants need to speak, but like The Masked Singer, they would need to, in some way, disguise the voice. Like The Masked Singer, the contestants utilize elaborate costumes, made easier to dance in, but with a "similar eccentricity" including headpieces and they compete by performing dances that "could be a group dance or dances with another person". Unlike that show, The Masked Dancer requires more rehearsals as the celebrity contestants have to learn the choreography.

Originally expected to debut in the middle of 2020, production was delayed until October due to the COVID-19 pandemic.

== Broadcast ==
Fox aired the series in the United States. Though it was scheduled between two seasons of The Masked Singer, the network was unconcerned about audience burnout as episodes were shorter and less frequent than other reality competition series. CTV, which broadcasts The Masked Singer in Canada, simulcasts the show in that country.

== Contestants ==
The series features 10 contestants, who were announced on November 4, 12, and 25, 2020. The contestants in this series have sold more than 38 million albums worldwide, 20 Emmy Awards wins, 20 Grammy nominations, 10 World Dancing titles, five New York Times Best-Selling Author titles, four Olympic gold medals, and three appearances in Broadway shows.

Results
Stage name	Celebrity	Occupation(s)	Episodes							
Stage name	Celebrity	Occupation(s)	1	2	3	4	5	6	7	9
Stage name	Celebrity	Occupation(s)	Group A	Group B		A	5	6	7	9
Cotton Candy	Gabby Douglas	Gymnast		SAFE	SAFE		SAFE	SAFE	SAFE	WINNER
Sloth	Maksim Chmerkovskiy	Ballroom dancer		SAFE	SAFE		SAFE	SAFE	SAFE	RUNNER-UP
Tulip	Mackenzie Ziegler	Dancer/singer	SAFE			SAFE	SAFE	SAFE	SAFE	THIRD
Zebra	Oscar De La Hoya	Boxer		SAFE	SAFE		SAFE	SAFE	OUT	
Exotic Bird	Jordin Sparks	Actress/singer	SAFE			SAFE	SAFE	OUT		
Hammerhead	Vinny Guadagnino	Reality TV personality	SAFE			SAFE	OUT			
Cricket	Brian McKnight	Singer	SAFE			OUT				
Moth	Elizabeth Smart	Child safety activist		SAFE	OUT					
Ice Cube	Bill Nye	Science communicator		OUT						
Disco Ball	Ice-T	Rapper/actor	OUT							

- SAFE The masked dancer was safe from elimination.
- OUT The masked dancer was eliminated from the competition and unmasked upon their elimination.
- The masked dancer did not perform.
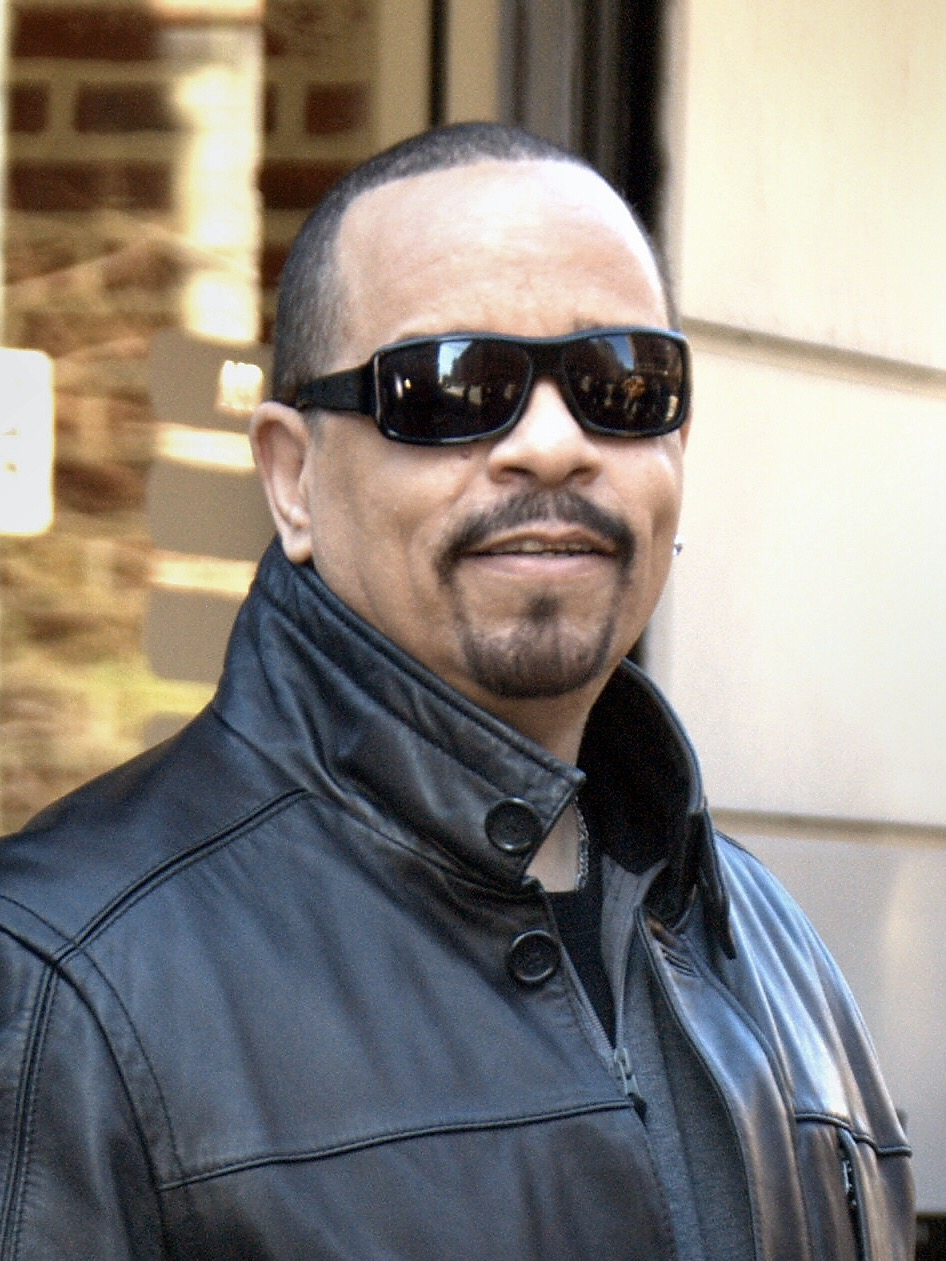
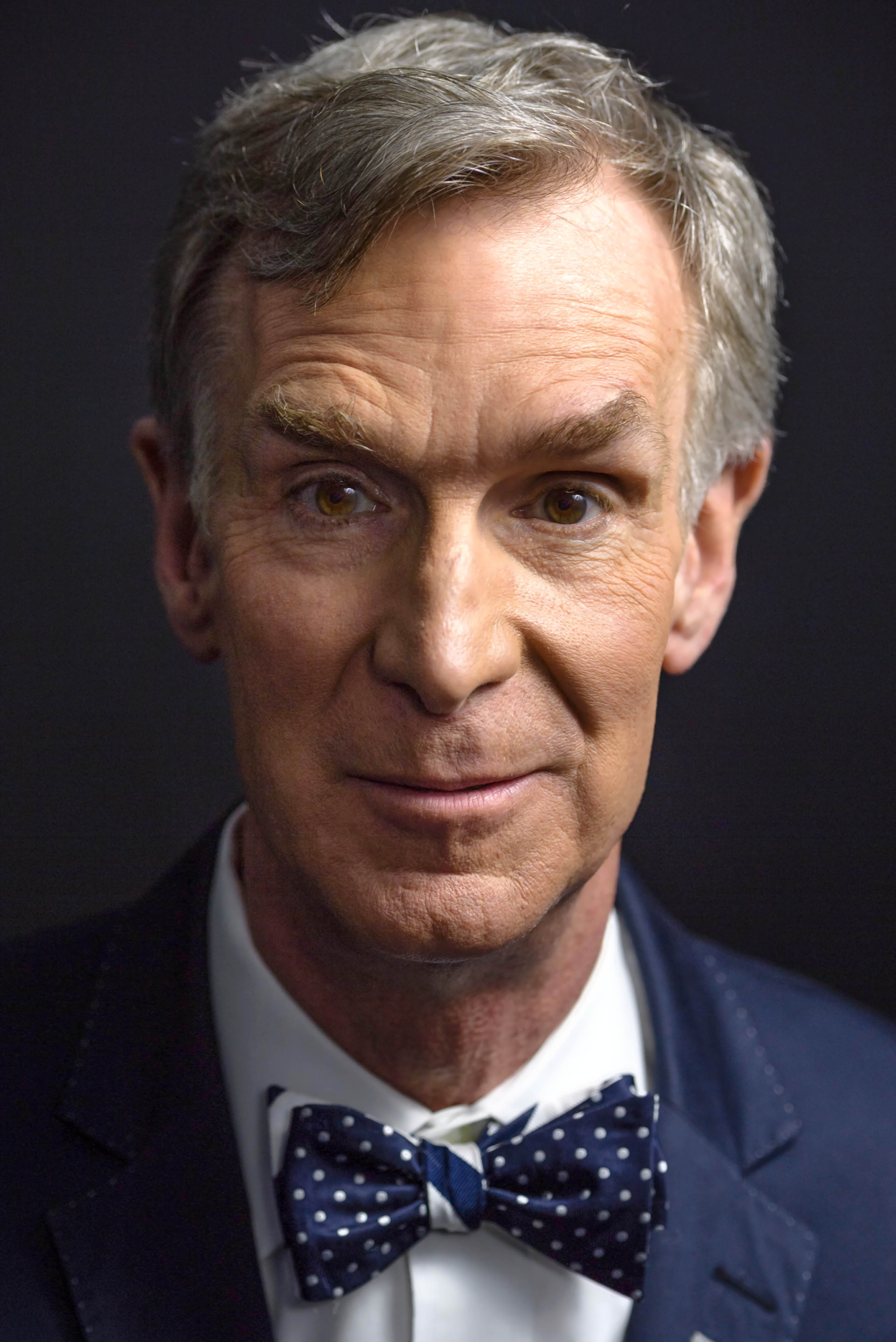
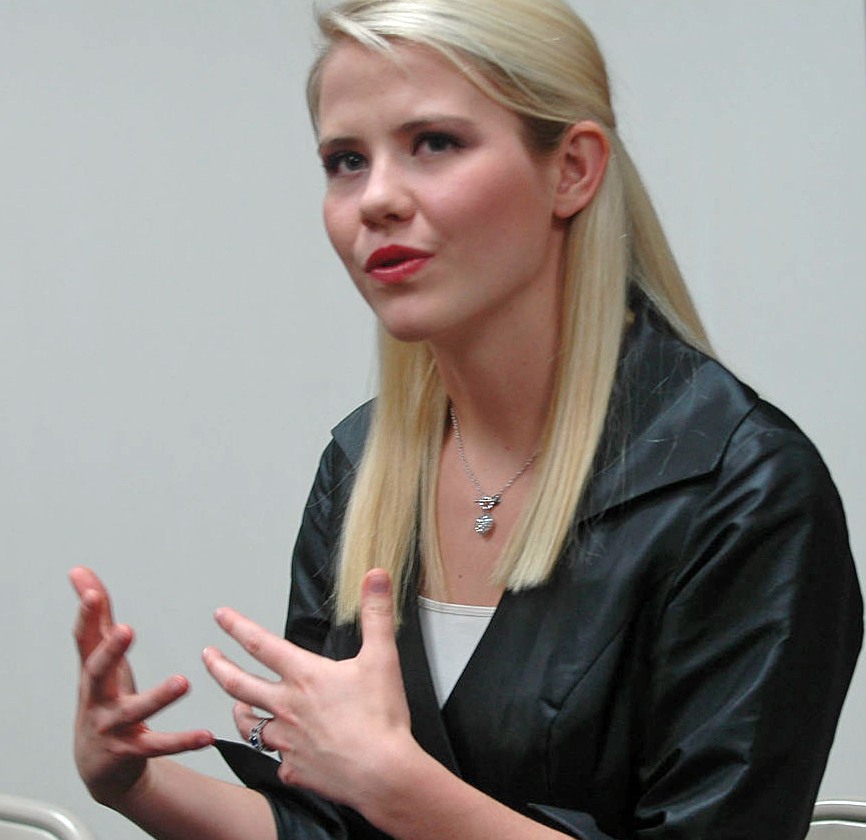
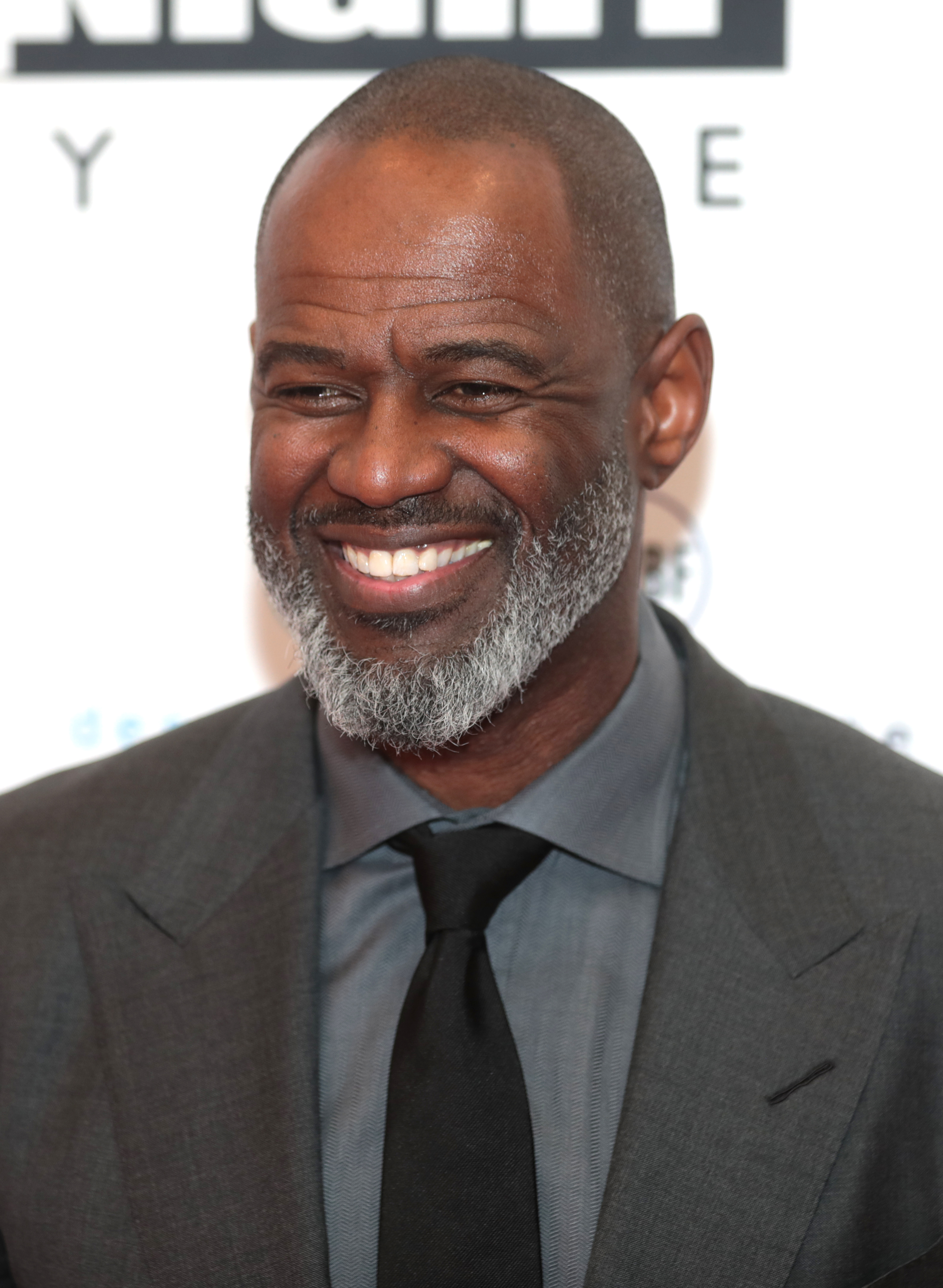
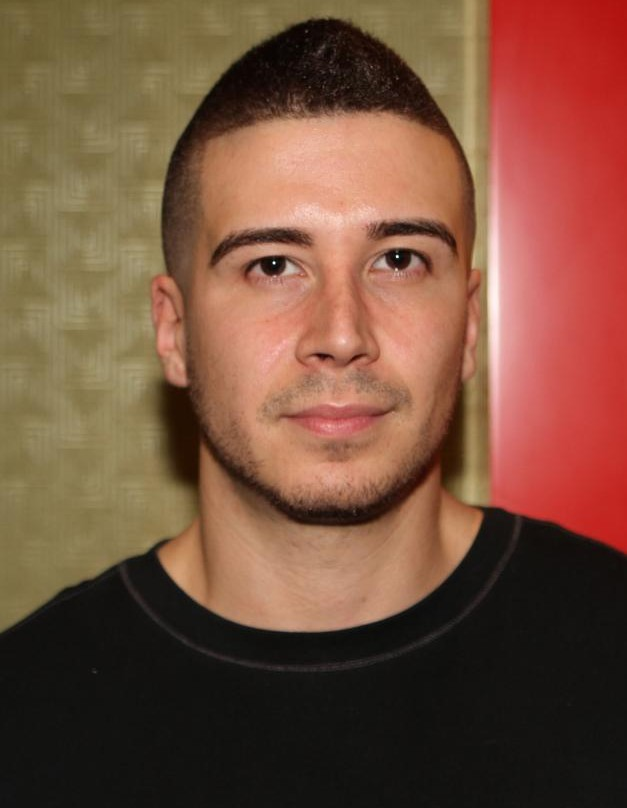
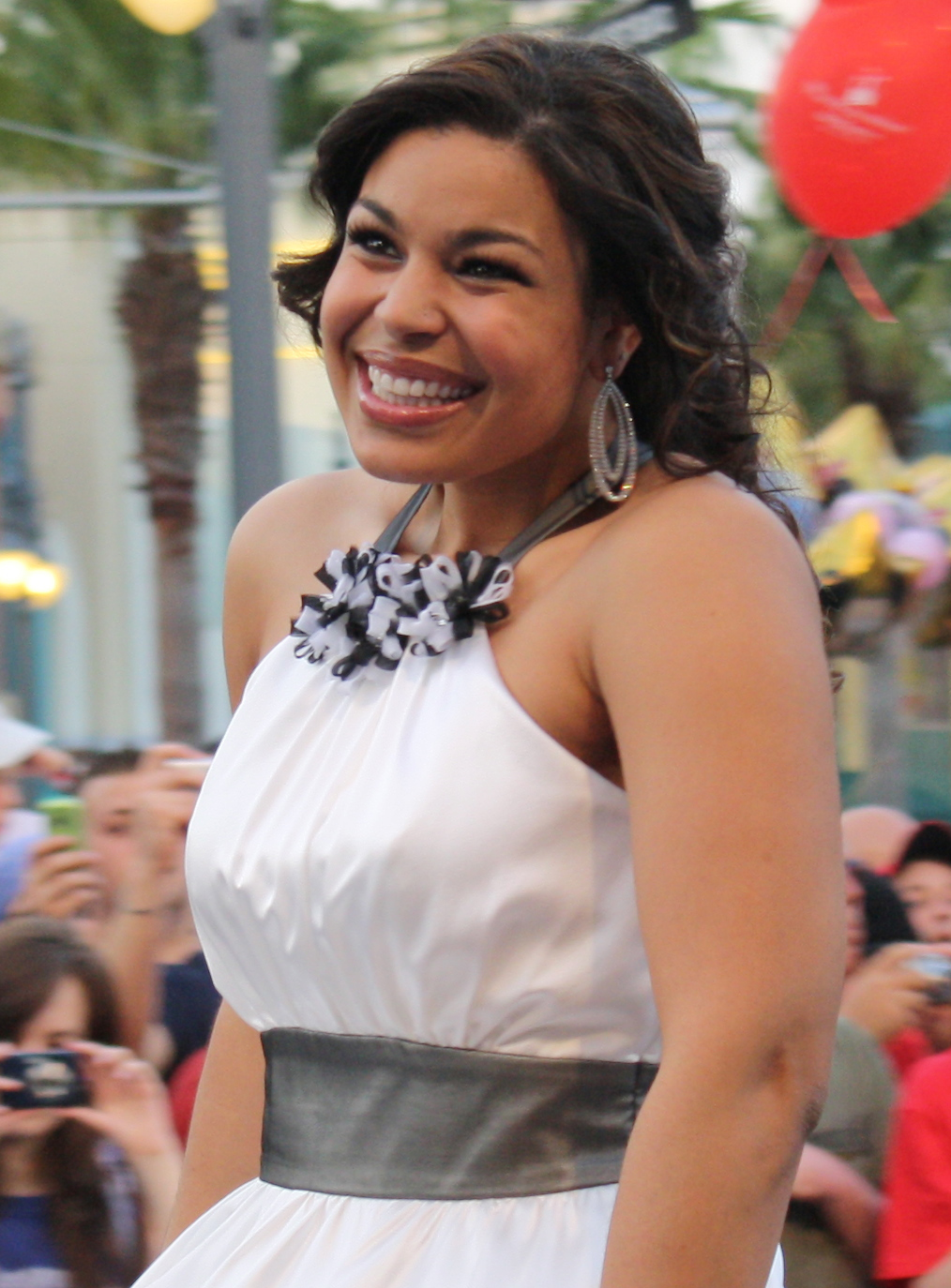
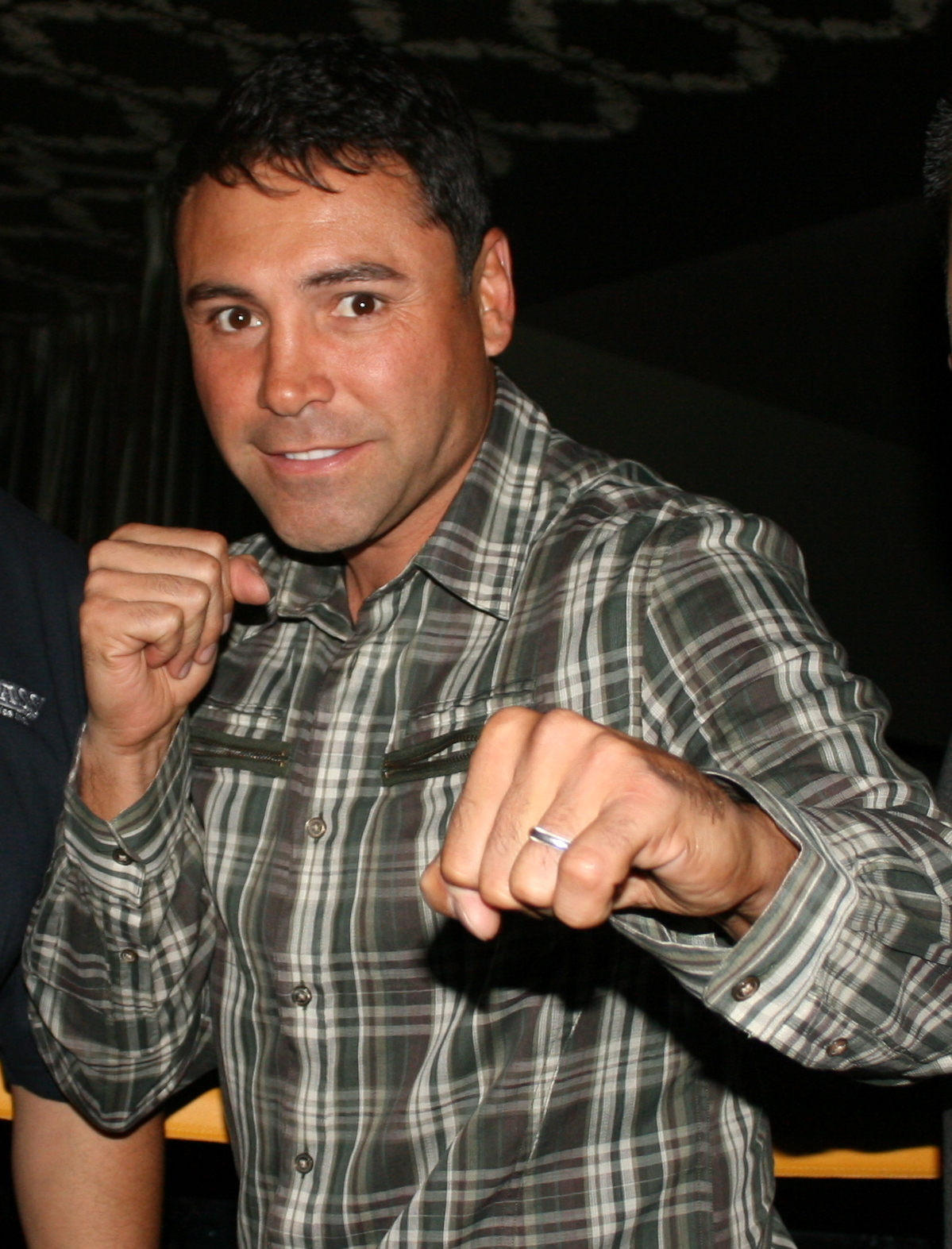
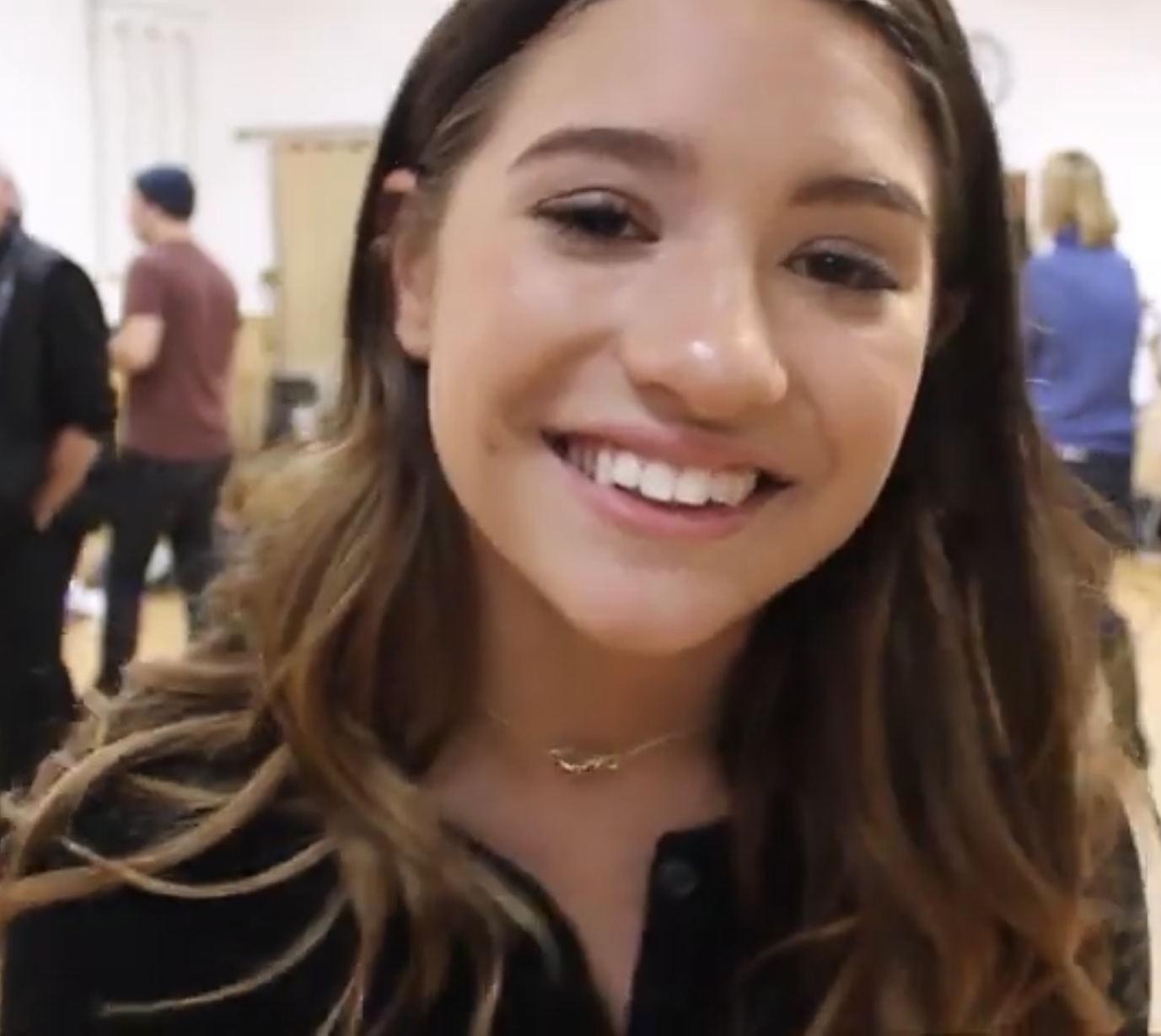
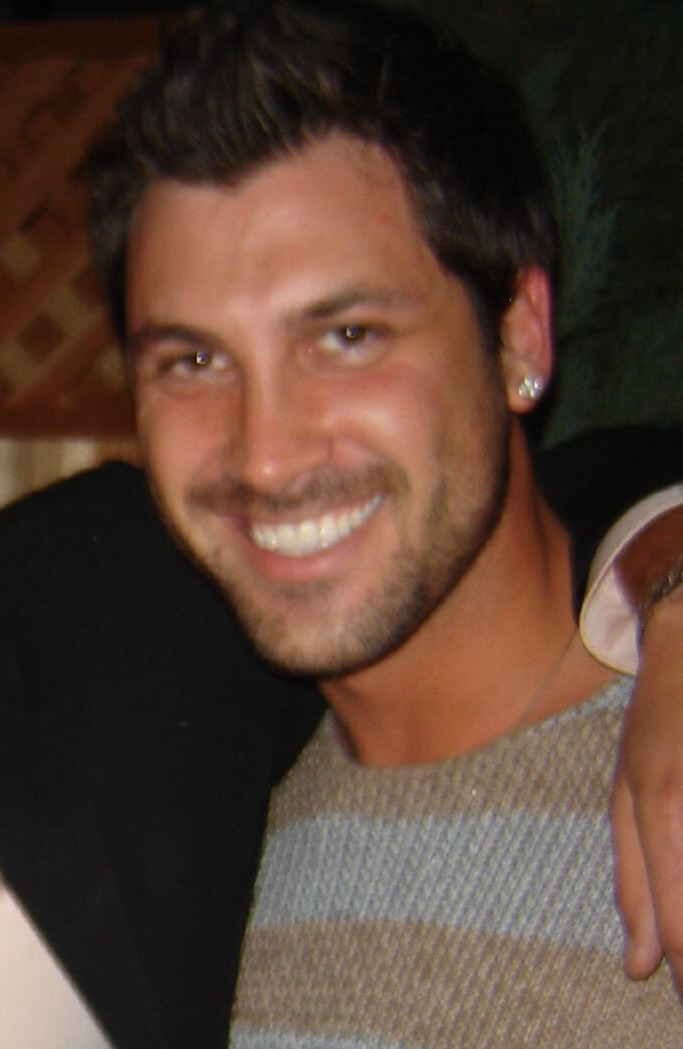
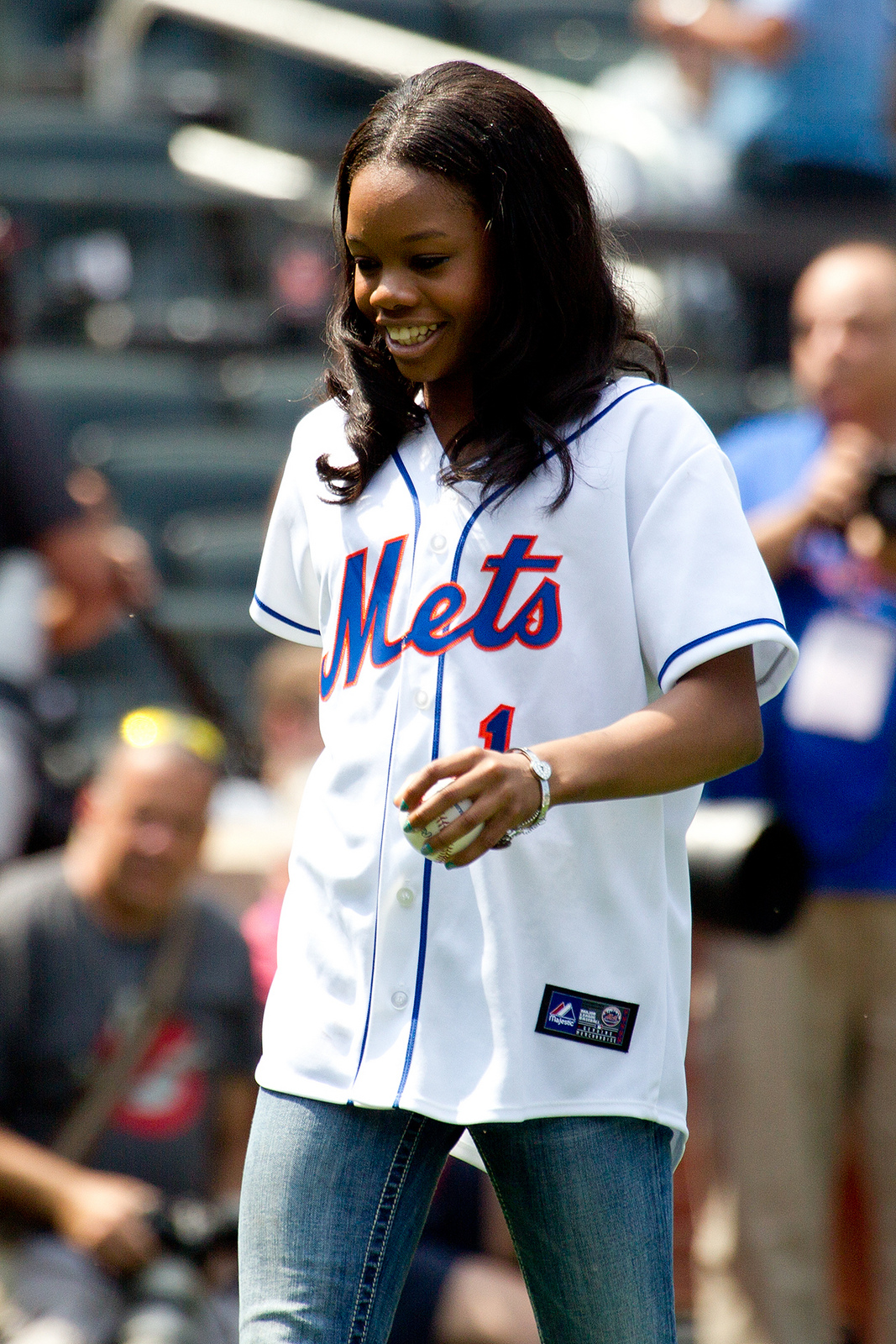
The celebrities who competed in The Masked Dancer, pictured in order of elimination (l-r):
Ice-T ("Disco Ball"), Bill Nye ("Ice Cube"), Elizabeth Smart ("Moth"), Brian McKnight ("Cricket"), Vinny Guadagnino ("Hammerhead"), Jordin Sparks ("Exotic Bird"), Oscar De La Hoya ("Zebra"), Mackenzie Ziegler ("Tulip"), Maksim Chmerkovskiy ("Sloth"), and Gabby Douglas ("Cotton Candy")

== Episodes ==
=== Week 1 (December 27) ===
Performances on the first episode
#	Stage name	Song	Identity	Result
1	Hammerhead	"Everybody (Backstreet's Back)" by Backstreet Boys	undisclosed	SAFE
2	Tulip	"Fergalicious" by Fergie	undisclosed	SAFE
3	Cricket	"Jump (For My Love)" by The Pointer Sisters	undisclosed	SAFE
4	Disco Ball	"Uptown Funk" by Mark Ronson ft. Bruno Mars	Ice-T	OUT
5	Exotic Bird	"Con Calma" by Daddy Yankee and Katy Perry ft. Snow	undisclosed	SAFE

=== Week 2 (January 6) ===
Performances on the second episode
#	Stage name	Song	Identity	Result
1	Sloth	"What I Like About You" by The Romantics	undisclosed	SAFE
2	Ice Cube	"Bad Romance" by Postmodern Jukebox	Bill Nye	OUT
3	Zebra	"Magalenha" by Sérgio Mendes	undisclosed	SAFE
4	Cotton Candy	"Glitter in the Air" by Pink	undisclosed	SAFE
5	Moth	"Boot Scootin' Boogie" by Brooks & Dunn	undisclosed	SAFE

=== Week 3 (January 13) ===
Performances on the third episode
#	Stage name	Song	Identity	Result
1	Zebra	"All My Life" by K-Ci & JoJo	undisclosed	SAFE
2	Cotton Candy	"Sour Candy" by Lady Gaga ft. Blackpink	undisclosed	SAFE
3	Moth	"Sway" by Michael Bublé	Elizabeth Smart	OUT
4	Sloth	"Up Where We Belong" by Joe Cocker and Jennifer Warnes	undisclosed	SAFE

=== Week 4 (January 20) ===
Performances on the fourth episode
#	Stage name	Song	Identity	Result
1	Exotic Bird	"Latch" by Disclosure ft. Sam Smith	undisclosed	SAFE
2	Cricket	"This Is How We Do It" by Montell Jordan	Brian McKnight	OUT
3	Hammerhead	"Blinding Lights" by The Weeknd	undisclosed	SAFE
4	Tulip	"Fields of Gold" by Eva Cassidy	undisclosed	SAFE

=== Week 5 (January 27) ===
Performances on the fifth episode
#	Stage name	Song	Identity	Result
1	Cotton Candy	"Great Balls of Fire" by Jerry Lee Lewis	undisclosed	SAFE
2	Exotic Bird	"Rush" by Lewis Capaldi ft. Jessie Reyez	undisclosed	SAFE
3	Sloth	"Ain't That a Kick in the Head" by Dean Martin	undisclosed	SAFE
4	Hammerhead	"Don't Let Me Be Misunderstood" by Santa Esmeralda	Vinny Guadagnino	OUT
5	Tulip	"Thank U, Next" by Ariana Grande	undisclosed	SAFE
6	Zebra	"Mi Gente" by J Balvin & Willy William	undisclosed	SAFE

=== Week 6 (February 3) ===
Performances on the sixth episode
#	Stage name	Song	Identity	Result
1	Tulip	"My Boyfriend's Back" by The Chiffons	undisclosed	SAFE
2	Zebra	"Take You Dancing" by Jason Derulo	undisclosed	SAFE
3	Sloth	"Twist Remix" by Neeraj Shridhar	undisclosed	SAFE
4	Exotic Bird	"Opposites Attract" by Paula Abdul	Jordin Sparks	OUT
5	Cotton Candy	"Swan Lake" by Tchaikovsky	undisclosed	SAFE

=== Week 7 (February 10) ===
Group performance: "Shut Up & Dance" by Walk the Moon

Performances on the seventh episode
#	Stage name	Song	Identity	Result
1	Cotton Candy	"Get Ready for This" by 2 Unlimited/"Mickey" by Toni Basil	undisclosed	SAFE
2	Sloth	"Dancing with a Stranger" by Sam Smith feat. Normani	undisclosed	SAFE
3	Zebra	"Mack the Knife" by Bobby Darin	Oscar De La Hoya	OUT
4	Tulip	Polka	undisclosed	SAFE

=== Week 8 (February 17) ===
Group performance: "(I've Had) the Time of My Life" by Bill Medley and Jennifer Warnes (performed by Craig Robinson)

Performances on the ninth episode
#	Stage name	Song	Identity	Result
1	Tulip	"Kings & Queens" by Ava Max	Mackenzie Ziegler	THIRD
2	Sloth	"Ballroom Blitz" by The Sweet	Maksim Chmerkovskiy	RUNNER-UP
3	Cotton Candy	"This Is Me" by Kesha	Gabby Douglas	WINNER

== Ratings ==
Viewership and ratings per episode of The Masked Dancer
No.	Title	Air date	Timeslot (ET)	Rating (18–49)	Viewers (millions)	DVR (18–49)	DVR viewers (millions)	Total (18–49)	Total viewers (millions)	Ref.
1	"Premiere - Everybody Mask Now!"	December 27, 2020	Sunday 8:00 p.m.	1.4	5.12	—N/a	—N/a	—N/a	—N/a	
2	"Group B Premiere - New Year, New Mask! (Who Dis?)"	January 6, 2021	Wednesday 8:00 p.m.	0.8	2.94	0.2	0.84	1.0	3.78	
3	"Group B Playoffs - These Masks Don't Lie!"	January 13, 2021	Wednesday 8:00 p.m.	0.7	3.04	0.2	0.75	0.9	3.79	
4	"Group A Playoffs - So You Think You Can Mask?"	January 20, 2021	Wednesday 8:00 p.m.	0.7	2.88	—N/a	0.45	—N/a	3.33	(Note: Live+7 ratings were not available, so Live+3 ratings have been used instead.)
5	"Super Six"	January 27, 2021	Wednesday 8:00 p.m.	0.6	2.74	—N/a	—N/a	—N/a	—N/a	
6	"Top Five - Mask the Night Away!"	February 3, 2021	Wednesday 8:00 p.m.	0.6	2.75	—N/a	0.51	—N/a	3.26	
7	"Semifinals - It's All About the Dance!"	February 10, 2021	Wednesday 8:00 p.m.	0.6	2.79	—N/a	—N/a	—N/a	—N/a	
8	"Road to the Finals - Final Clues to the Mask!"	February 17, 2021	Wednesday 8:00 p.m.	0.5	2.74	—N/a	—N/a	—N/a	—N/a	
9	"The Finale - One Last Mask!"	February 17, 2021	Wednesday 9:00 p.m.	0.7	3.23	—N/a	0.60	—N/a	3.83	
