= Shallon Lester =

American gossip columnist and YouTuber (born 1981)

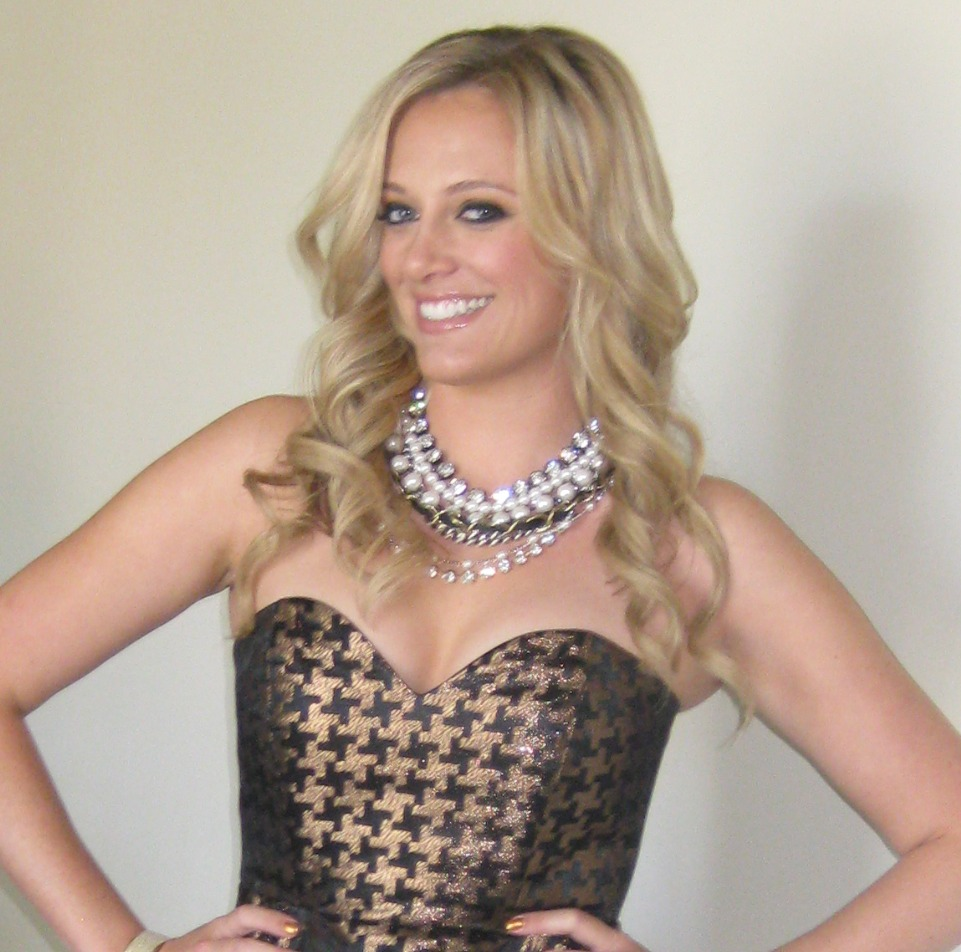
- Lester at the MTV Movie Awards in 2010
- Born: Shallon Nadine Lester; January 23, 1981 (age 45); San Francisco, California, U.S.
- Education: California Polytechnic State University (BA)
- Occupations: Gossip columnist; Social media personality; YouTuber
- Employers: FHM; New York Daily News; Glamour; Star
- Television: Downtown Girls
Shallon Lester
Instagram information
- Page: Shallon Lester
- Years active: 2011–present
- Followers: 78.4 thousand
Substack information
- Newsletter: The Shallontourage; Eat Prey Love
- Notes: @shallon
- Subscribers: 9.4 thousand
TikTok information
- Page: Shallon Lester
- Years active: 2019–present
- Followers: 46.4k thousand
YouTube information
- Channel: Shallon Lester
- Years active: 2006–present
- Subscribers: 357 thousand
- Views: 117 million
- Website: shallonlester.com

Shallon Nadine Lester (born January 23, 1981) is an American gossip columnist, author, editor, social media personality, and YouTuber. Lester previously wrote for newspapers and magazines such as the New York Daily News, FHM and Glamour, and served as an editor for Star Magazine. Lester also starred in the 2010 MTV reality television show: Downtown Girls.

== Early life ==
Lester was born in San Francisco to parents Nicolas and Nadine Lester. Lester was raised in Irvine, California, and graduated from University High School. Lester attended California Polytechnic State University, San Luis Obispo (commonly referred to as Cal Poly), and graduated with a Bachelor of arts degree in Speech communication in 2003. During her college years, Lester was part of the Gamma Phi Beta sorority and was a columnist for the Mustang Daily: the university's newspaper.

== Career ==
After college, Lester moved to New York City and got her first job writing for CollegeHumor. In 2007, Lester became a gossip columnist for the New York Daily News where she worked with Rush & Molloy. In 2008, Lester collaborated with Julie Kraut to publish her first fiction book called "Hot Mess: Summer in the City" which main plot was about a girl tell[ing] a lie to this hot guy she meets, and [the lie]... spirals out of control". In 2009, Lester ended up starring on Downtown Girls through Rush & Molloy's pitch for a show to MTV. That same year, Lester moved over to contribute for the paper's "Gatecrasher" column until her resignation in February 25, 2009.

== Controversies ==
=== D'Angelo Wallace ===
In March 25, 2020, Lester published a YouTube video titled "HOW TO SPOT A PSYCHOPATH: The Truth About Ellen Degeneres". Commentator YouTuber D'Angelo Wallace made a response video titled "shallon lester blocked me before i could get the truth out" criticizing Lester's method of analysis. Within a few days, Lester accused Wallace of doxxing her, and said that she reported Wallace to the police. Lester has yet to provide proof what she accused Wallace of, and Wallace has not been criminally charged for the doxxing allegation.

=== Disparaging comments on Bozeman residents ===
In 2023, Business Insider published an article three years after Lester's move to Bozeman, Montana. Lester received backlash from local residents for, what they believed to be, making infantilizing, out-of-touch comments about the city's male residents' dating preferences where she perceived that they preferred "girls who need saving, or [girls] who may have jobs but not careers" instead of "her type of intelligence", and comments downplaying the city's residents moving away due to rising housing costs by stating that "it's common to see employees not show up to work if it's a good ski day or the first day of elk-hunting season." Lester responded to an Instagram page, that criticized her, by calling the account owner a "goblin" and an "anonymous, broke, dumpy pigeon".

== Personal life ==
Since June 2020, Lester currently resides in Bozeman, Montana, and has a dog named Cowboy.

== Works ==
=== Newspaper Articles ===
- Lester, Shallon (November 15, 2002). "Where attraction lies". The Daily Illini. Urbana, Illinois, U.S. U-Wire. p. 11 – via Newspapers.com.
- Lester, Shallon (2007). "TV Interview, Mellisa McNulty". FHM. Archived from the original on February 18, 2007.
- Lester, Shallon (October 16, 2007). "The Tacky-Less Trump". New York Daily News. New York City. p. 34 – via Newspapers.com.
- Lester, Shallon (November 27, 2007). "5 Tips For Safe Toy Gifts". New York Daily News. New York City. p. 35 – via Newspapers.com.
- Lester, Shallon (December 6, 2007). "Message Received". New York Daily News. New York City. p. 35 – via Newspapers.com.
- Lester, Shallon; Jaccarino, Mike; Lemire, Jonathan (February 2, 2008). "Super celeb parties, too". New York Daily News. Phoenix, Arizona, U.S. p. 2 – via Newspapers.com.
- Lester, Shallon; Lemire, Jonathan (February 3, 2008). "Super temptations lurking for all sorts of players". New York Daily News. Phoenix, Arizona, U.S. p. 9 – via Newspapers.com.
- Lester, Shallon; Jaccarino, Mike; Lemire, Jonathan (February 4, 2008). "Parties go into OT for rich & famous". New York Daily News. Phoenix, Arizona, U.S. p. 16 – via Newspapers.com.
- Lester, Shallon (April 15, 2008). "My chance to see Paris". New York Daily News. New York City. p. 31 – via Newspapers.com.
- Lester, Shallon (July 7, 2008). "Pros: Porn's not at fault". New York Daily News. New York City. p. 31 – via Newspapers.com.
- Lester, Shallon (July 13, 2008). "Reality TV Auditions: How To Be A 'Survivor'". New York Daily News. New York City. p. 5 – via Newspapers.com.
- Lester, Shallon (July 15, 2008). "Role of a lifetime for Ledger as new 'Batman' premieres". New York Daily News. New York City. p. 4 – via Newspapers.com.
- Dillon, Nancy; Lester, Shallon (July 29, 2008). "Shia's passenger is Grenier's gal". New York Daily News. New York City. p. 5 – via Newspapers.com.

=== Books ===
- Kraut, Julie; Lester, Shallon (May 13, 2008). Hot Mess: Summer in the City. Delacorte Press. ISBN 9780385735063.
- Lester, Shallon (June 7, 2011). Exes and Ohs: A Downtown Girl's (Mostly Awkward) Tales of Love, Lust, Revenge, and a Little Facebook Stalking. Three Rivers Press. ISBN 978-0307885111.
