= List of programs broadcast by MTV Classic =

This is a list of programs that are currently and formerly broadcast by MTV Classic (formerly known as VH1 Classic).

== Current programming ==
=== Music video blocks ===
All programming listed is currently 6 hour-long automated blocks of videos:

Title	Year(s) airing
120 Minutes	August 8, 2016–present
90s Nation	August 2, 2016–present
House of Pop	August 3, 2016–present
I Want My 80s	August 4, 2016–present
Metal Mayhem	August 12, 2016–present
MTV Classic Videos	August 1, 2016–present
Rock Block	August 5, 2016–present
Total Request Playlist	August 2, 2016–present
Yo! Hip Hop Mix	August 3, 2016–present

=== Special events ===
==== Award shows ====
Title	Year(s) airing
BET Awards	2017–present
MTV Europe Music Awards	2016–present
MTV Movie & TV Awards	2017–present
MTV Video Music Awards	2016–present

== Former programming ==
=== Former programming by VH1 Classic ===
Title
The 60's Generation
90s Rocked
All Request Hour
All Star Jams
BBC Crown Jewels
Box Set
Buffy the Vampire Slayer
Class of...
Classic in Concert
Classic Jukebox
Club MTV
Decades Rock Live!
The Drug Years
Entourage
For What It's Worth
Hangin' with Encore
Headline Act
Heavy: The Story of Metal
Hip Hop Honors
History of Rock and Roll
I Love...
The Larry Sanders Show
Live from Daryl's House
Lords of the Revolution
Married... with Children
Metal Mania
Morning Video Block
One Hit Wonders
Pop Show
Rock Fest
Rock N Roll Fantasy Camp
Rock & Roll Picture Show
Rocky and Friends
Saturday Night Live
Seven Ages of Rock
Sex: The Revolution
The Super Seventies
Top 20 Countdown
Top 20 Flashback
Totally 80s
Turn Tables
The Vault
VH1 Classic Current
VH1 Classic Soul
VH1 Classic's All-time Top Ten
VH1 Rock Docs
VH1 Rock Honors
You Can't Stop Hip Hop

=== Former programming by MTV Classic ===
==== Music video blocks ====
Title	Year(s) aired
90s Feast	2016
90 Hours of '90s Hip Hop	2017
90s House Playlist	2017
Artist Spotlight Playlist	2018–2026
Behind the Music Playlist	2021
Boo, B....! Get Out the Way	2017
Classic Christmas	2018–2019
Countdown to Jersey Shore Family Vacation	2018
Countdown to TRL	2017
Lunch Break / TRL Recap	2017–18
Tribute Playlist	2016–2019
VH1 Hip Hop Honors Playlist	2017–2019
VMA Performer Spotlight/Nominees Playlist	2018–2019
VMA Video Vanguard Playlist	2018–2019
Women's History Month	2018–2019

==== Music series ====
Title	Year(s) aired
Austin City Limits	2016
Behind the Music Remastered	2016
Classic Albums	2016
Live from Daryl's House	2016
Metal Evolution	2016
MTV Unplugged	2016
MTV World Stage	2016
My Life on MTV	2021
Pop-Up Video	2016
Rock Fest	2016
Rock Icons	2016
That Metal Show	2016
TRL	2018
VH1 Storytellers	2016

==== Comedy series ====
Title	Year(s) aired
Jackass	2016

==== Reality series ====
Title	Year(s) aired
The Hills	2016, 2019
Laguna Beach: The Real Orange County	2016
Next	2016
Pimp My Ride	2016
Punk'd	2016
The Real World	2016
Road Rules	2016
Run's House	2016
True Life	2016
Wildboyz	2016

==== Animated series ====
Title	Year(s) aired
Æon Flux	2016
Beavis and Butt-Head	2016
Celebrity Deathmatch	2016
Clone High	2016
Daria	2016
The Maxx	2016
Wonder Showzen	2016

==== Celebrity series ====
Title	Year(s) aired
MTV Cribs	2016

==== Competitive series ====
Title	Year(s) aired
Yo Momma	2016

== See also ==
- List of programs broadcast by MTV
- List of programs broadcast by MTV2
