= Vinny Guadagnino =

American television personality

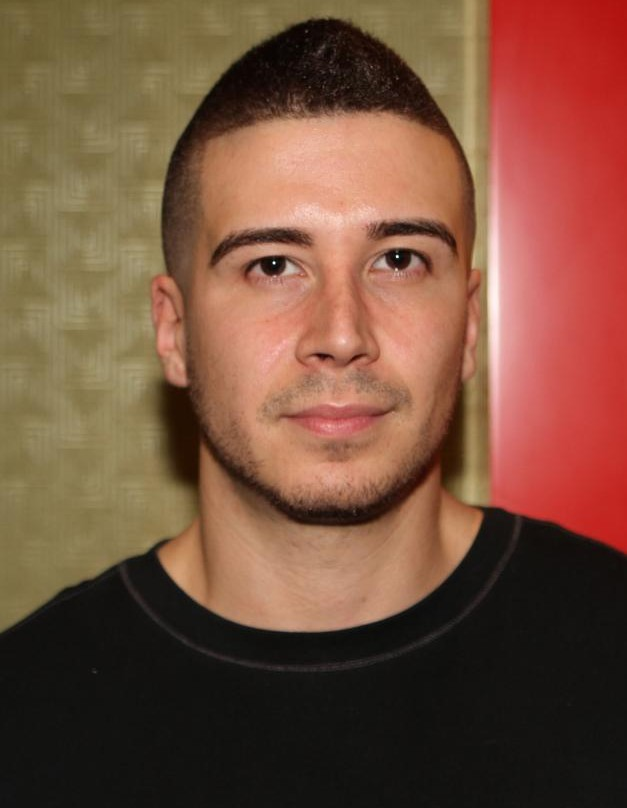
- Guadagnino in 2011
- Born: Vincent J. Guadagnino; November 11, 1987 (age 38); Staten Island, New York, U.S.
- Other names: Twiggy, Keto Guido, Vinny G
- Education: State University of New York at New Paltz; College of Staten Island (BA)
- Occupation: Reality television personality
- Years active: 2009–present
- Known for: Jersey Shore; The Show with Vinny; Jersey Shore: Family Vacation; Double Shot at Love

Vincent J. Guadagnino (/ˌɡwɑːdəˈniːnoʊ/ GWAH-də-NEE-noh, Italian: [ɡwadaɲˈɲiːno]; born November 11, 1987) is an American reality television personality, best known for being a cast member on MTV's Jersey Shore.

== Early life and education ==
Guadagnino was born and raised in Emerson Hill, Staten Island, New York, and comes from a traditional Italian-American family. His mother was born in Sicily and immigrated to the United States at age 13. His family's farm is visited during an episode in Jersey Shore's fourth season.

He graduated from Susan E. Wagner High School, the same high school that his Jersey Shore costar Angelina Pivarnick attended. He later studied at SUNY New Paltz before transferring to the College of Staten Island, graduating with a degree in political science. Prior to being cast on Jersey Shore, Guadagnino planned to attend law school.

== Career ==
Guadagnino was a member of the starting cast MTV's Jersey Shore and appeared in all six seasons from 2009 to 2012. After Jersey Shore, Guadagnino began taking acting classes. He guest-starred on MTV's scripted comedy series The Hard Times of RJ Berger as RJ's cousin. In the November 8, 2011, episode of 90210, he played a small role that he reprised in the episode "O Holly Night". He also appeared in the Syfy original movie Jersey Shore Shark Attack.

MTV also produced Guadagnino's talk show, The Show with Vinny, which debuted in May 2013. The show featured celebrities at Guadagnino's home talking and having dinner with him and his family. He and his mother would later star in Vinny & Ma Eat America on The Cooking Channel.

In 2018, he reunited with most of his original Jersey Shore castmates for a reboot of the series titled Jersey Shore: Family Vacation. The first and second seasons aired in 2018, and a third season began in 2019.

Starting in April 2019, Guadagnino has been starring alongside Pauly D in a Double Shot at Love on MTV.

On April 26, 2019, he started a month long residency performing as guest host in Chippendales at the Rio Hotel & Casino in Las Vegas.

In 2021, he competed on The Masked Singer spin-off The Masked Dancer as "Hammerhead" and was eliminated in the sixth spot during Battle of the Super Six. He was also a contestant on season 31 of Dancing with the Stars, which premiered in September 2022. He partnered with Koko Iwasaki, and placed seventh.

== Other ventures ==
In 2011, Guadagnino launched a clothing brand called IHAV (for "I Have a Vision") with the message Fuck Bullies. Proceeds are donated to the charity Do Something for grants for anti-bullying projects and programs. He also supports the animal rescue organization Much Love, for whom he recently participated in a charity auction. Guadagnino is also a supporter of gay rights. He has been a presenter at the GLAAD Awards and participated in the NOH8 Campaign.

Guadagnino also co-authored a book with Samantha Rose entitled Control The Crazy: My Plan To Stop Stressing, Avoid Drama, and Maintain Inner Cool.

In 2018, he released a new clothing brand called Name Brand NYC.

Guadagnino is a low-carbohydrate diet advocate and supports the ketogenic diet for weight loss, having lost 50 pounds (23 kg) using it himself, and has been featured multiple times in Men's Health Magazine, giving advice on the diet. Additionally, he started an Instagram account dedicated to the keto lifestyle. In 2019, he authored The Keto Guido Cookbook.

== Personal life ==
Guadagnino attended the 2024 Donald Trump rally at Madison Square Garden in New York City, praising Trump as the "anti-establishment/anti-war/anti-inflation candidate".

== Filmography ==
- The Gate of Fallen Angels (2009)
- Jersey Shore (2009–2012)
- When I Was 17 (2010)
- The Hard Times of RJ Berger (2011)
- 90210 (2011)
- Silent Library (2011)
- Jersey Shore Shark Attack (2012)
- The Show with Vinny (2013)
- The Great Food Truck Race (2016)
- Vinny & Ma Eat America (2017)
- Jersey Shore: Family Vacation (2018–2026)
- Double Shot at Love (2019–2021)
- Revenge Prank (2020–2021)
- The Masked Dancer (2021) as Hammerhead
- Good Morning America (2022) as guest
- Dancing with the Stars (2022) as contestant (season 31)
- All Star Shore (2023)
