= The Electric Barbarellas =

American girl group

The Electric Barbarellas were an American all-female electropop group whose career with producer Midi Mafia was depicted in a short-lived, critically panned, eponymous reality show that ran for one season on MTV.

== Background ==
In 2010, Viacom CEO Sumner Redstone personally paid over $500,000 to fly the group to New York to meet with record labels while filming a reality-TV series based on the trip, after asking then-Viacom CEO Philippe Dauman to give one of his romantic pursuits an MTV series. Redstone then forced Viacom-owned MTV to air the series. MTV executives originally balked at airing it because it was "so bad" but their resistance almost cost MTV's then-CEO Judy McGrath her job. Les Moonves also arranged for the series to be promoted on CBS, as a favor to Redstone.

The series ended with a phone call from a record executive provoking much shrieking, but the group quickly faded into obscurity once the show ended.

The group performed the song "Without You" on The Late Late Show with Craig Ferguson on May 27, 2011. In their 2023 book Unscripted: The Epic Battle for a Media Empire and the Redstone Family Legacy, James B. Stewart and Rachel Abrams said that the Barbarellas were "singing wildly off pitch" in that Late Late Show appearance and that Moonves "dreaded" the requests by Redstone to promote the group on CBS.

== Members ==
- Heather Naylor, Chelsea Costa, Gynger Fluellen, Missy, and Raven

== Discography ==
- Strange World (2011)

== The Alectrix ==
Two years later, Naylor hired Joe Simpson (father of Ashlee and Jessica Simpson) to audition new members for the group, under the new name The Alectrix. Again, the ordeal was filmed as a reality-TV series and aired on MTV. And again, soon after the series ended, the group faded quickly into obscurity.

Later, Naylor was sued by Sumner Redstone's girlfriend Sydney Holland for allegedly stealing her laptop. Naylor counter-sued, claiming Holland negatively influenced Redstone to intentionally interfere with the success of The Alectrix, however Naylor eventually dropped the lawsuit.
