= Families of the Mafia =

American reality television series

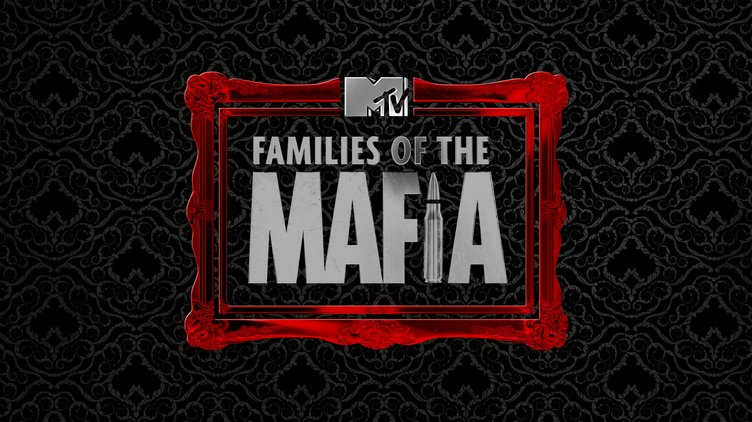
- Genre: Reality
- Based on: Made in Staten Island
- Country of origin: United States
- Original language: English
- No. of seasons: 2
- No. of episodes: 16

Production
- Executive producers: Adam Gonzalez; Karen Gravano; Daniel Blau Rogge
- Production locations: Staten Island, NY

Original release
- Network: MTV
- Release: April 9, 2020 – September 9, 2021

Families of the Mafia is an American reality television series that premiered on MTV on April 9, 2020. The show is a retooling of the short-lived Made in Staten Island. Its predecessor focused on the lives of seven young adults living in Staten Island trying to avoid the influence of local organized crime. In March 2020, fourteen months after its sudden cancellation, MTV announced they had continued to work with five of the seven young adults and the producers. The focus shifted on the lives of the families, all connected in some way to not only one another, but the mafia and other mobs.

A second season premiered on July 15, 2021.

== Cast ==
- The Gravanos
  - Karen Gravano
  - Karina Seabrook
  - Sammy "The Bull" Gravano
  - Ramona Rizzo (season 1)
- The O'Tooles
  - Joe O'Toole
  - Taylor O'Toole
  - Jessica Clare
  - Matt O'Toole (season 2)
  - Billy O'Toole † (season 1)
- The LaRoccas
  - Gina LaRocca
  - Christian "CP" Patterson Jr.
  - Trish Gelardi
  - Anthony Gelardi
  - Christian "Chris" Patterson Sr. † (season 2)
- The Nayfelds (season 2)
  - Eli Kiperman
  - Boris Nayfeld
  - Angela Kiperman Nayfeld
- The Cutolos (season 2)
  - Billy Cutolo Jr.
  - Nahla Cutolo
  - Billy "Bills" Cutolo III
  - Layla Cutolo
  - Nicco Cutolo
- The Augustines (season 1)
  - Lisa Augustine
  - Dennie Augustine

== Episodes ==
=== Series overview ===
Season	Episodes	Originally released	
Season	Episodes	First released	Last released
1	6	April 9, 2020	May 7, 2020
2	10	July 15, 2021	September 9, 2021

=== Season 1 (2020) ===
No. overall	No. in season	Title	Original release date	U.S. viewers (millions)
1	1	"Part I"	April 9, 2020	0.46 (MTV); 0.27 (VH1)
2	2	"Part II"	April 16, 2020	0.44
3	3	"Part III"	April 16, 2020	0.30
4	4	"Part IV"	April 23, 2020	0.35
5	5	"Part V"	April 30, 2020	0.35
6	6	"Part VI"	May 7, 2020	0.36

=== Season 2 (2021) ===
No. overall	No. in season	Title	Original release date	U.S. viewers (millions)
7	1	"Chapter 1 - Reflection"	July 15, 2021	0.27 (MTV); 0.14 (VH1)
8	2	"Chapter 2 - Redemption"	July 22, 2021	0.31
9	3	"Chapter 3 - Understanding"	July 29, 2021	0.32
10	4	"Chapter 4 - Discovering"	August 5, 2021	0.19
11	5	"Chapter 5 - Confirmation"	August 12, 2021	0.22
12	6	"Chapter 6 - Rebuilding"	August 19, 2021	0.30
13	7	"Chapter 7 - Homecoming"	August 26, 2021	0.26
14	8	"Chapter 8 - Healing"	September 2, 2021	0.14
15	9	"Chapter 9 - Reconciliation"	September 9, 2021	0.13
16	10	"Chapter 10 - Conclusion"	September 9, 2021	0.18
