= Revenge Prank =

American reality television series

- Genre: Reality; Hidden camera
- Written by: Tom Baker; Alistair Griggs; Ben Spiteri
- Presented by: Pauly D; Vinny Guadagnino
- Country of origin: United States
- Original language: English
- No. of seasons: 1
- No. of episodes: 24

Production
- Executive producers: Ross McCarthy; Jordan Read; Leanne Mucci; John Varela; Marisa Weinstein
- Producers: Gavin Evans; Bobbie Hall
- Cinematography: Chris Langan
- Editor: Simon Stanley
- Camera setup: Multi-camera
- Production company: Gobstopper Television

Original release
- Network: MTV
- Release: June 25, 2020 – February 18, 2021

Revenge Prank is an American reality television series hosted by Pauly D and Vinny Guadagnino, featuring prank victims who are given the chance to exact their revenge on the friend, family member or loved one who originally embarrassed them. The show's first season premiered on June 25, 2020, on MTV.

The series sparked controversy online on the subjects of credibility and on the emotional effects of the pranks.

== Synopsis ==
Each episode of Revenge Prank will pair DJ Pauly D or Vinny with a target of a viral internet prank who is seeking payback on a friend, family member or loved one who originally embarrassed them. With help from the duo, the pairs will attempt to pull off some of the most over-the-top pranks yet in order to get the ultimate revenge.

== Episodes ==
No.	Title	Original release date	U.S. viewers (millions)
1	"The Prank That Fell from the Sky"	June 25, 2020	0.43
Original Prank: Garrick VanBrocklin's wife, Zoe, faked her water breaking while pregnant. Revenge Prank: Garrick faked his death in front of his wife by throwing a mannequin (that was supposed to be him) out a plane.
2	"The Prank with the Unexpected Delivery"	June 25, 2020	0.40
Original Prank: Tamika and Kehonia's mom, Madeline, went viral for twerking in a bar. Revenge Prank: Tamika and Kehonia enter an ambulance with their mother, where Tamika pretends to be pregnant and in labor.
3	"The Prank with the Flash Drive"	July 2, 2020	0.30
Original Prank: Coca's girlfriend, Keisha, made Coca purposely mad and jealous for showing too much cleavage. Revenge Prank: Coca makes Keisha visit a lawyer, who asks for hush money for a fake sex tape of Coca and another woman.
4	"The Prank with a Pig"	July 2, 2020	0.30
Original Prank: Sunny's older brother, Soko, took advantage of Sunny's fear of snakes by putting a burmese python on his bed. Revenge Prank: Sunny makes Soko visit a pawn shop, where multiple Russian mobsters accuse Soko of stealing a valuable watch.
5	"The Prank with the Sugar Daddy"	July 9, 2020	0.41
Original Prank: Naja was a part of a viral video filmed by her mom, Tiffany, in which she was under anesthesia. Revenge Prank: Naja tells her mom she is dropping out of high school to move in with her sugar daddy, who is also a drug dealer.
6	"The Prank with the Tree of Truth"	July 9, 2020	0.41
Original Prank: Shane's wife, Liana, tricked Shane into thinking she had an STD. Revenge Prank: Shane takes Liana to a marriage counseling session, in which he tells her he had a daughter in high school.
7	"The Prank with the Sunlord"	July 16, 2020	0.30
Original Prank: Grace's overprotective dad, Pedro, went viral for interrogating Grace's date via his video doorbell. Revenge Prank: Grace invites Pedro to her house, where she pretends to have joined an anti-tech cult.
8	"The Prank with the Sidedish"	July 16, 2020	0.33
Original Prank: While sleeping, Brian had makeup put on him by his boyfriend Jaylon. Revenge Prank: Brian brings Jaylon to a fake restaurant, where a waiter tells Jaylon that Brian is cheating on him.
9	"The Prank with Grizzly"	July 23, 2020	0.30
Original Prank: Christine's son, Jay, squeezed a water bottle while she was looking at it, wetting her. Revenge Prank: Christine makes her son believe she's dating a recently released convict named Grizzly.
10	"The Prank That's NSFW"	July 30, 2020	0.32
Original Prank: Manni's friend, Robiii, gave Manni a winning lottery ticket that turned out to be fake. Revenge Prank: At a fake job interview, Robiii's computer gives the company he is interviewing a virus from a NSFW site.
11	"The Prank from the Other Side"	August 6, 2020	0.22
Original Prank: Rita's mom, Camille, embarrassed her by making an inappropriate alter ego online. Revenge Prank: At a psychic reading, Camille is told that the spirit of her deceased father is contacting her from the other side and that her husband is currently cheating on her.
12	"The Prank with a Bang"	August 13, 2020	0.25
Original Prank: Tonya's daughter, Kharisma, professed that she had broken Tonya's TV. Revenge Prank: With the help of Justina Valentine on Kharisma's birthday, Tonya lies to Kharisma that she got her the car of her dreams.
13	"The Prank That's Six Feet Under"	August 20, 2020	0.23
Original Prank: Precious's boyfriend, Jay, pranked her by pretending to be on the phone with another woman. Revenge Prank: Precious arranges a fake funeral, pretending to have had a secret ex-boyfriend.
14	"The Prank That Is Off Key"	August 27, 2020	0.27
Original Prank: Prime's girlfriend, Kianna, made Prime believe she was cheating on him by placing pictures of another man on her phone. Revenge Prank: Prime makes his girlfriend believe she messed up his career by making her think she deleted the recording of his "hit song."
15	"The Prank with Piglet"	September 3, 2020	0.30
Original Prank: Julia's boyfriend, Saud, made Julia go viral by showing her a fake hickey on her neck. Revenge Prank: Julia makes Saud visit a vet, where Saud is told that his pitbull has bitten someone and that it has to be taken away.
16	"The Prank That Hits the Jackpot"	September 10, 2020	0.19
Original Prank: Jay's sister, Britney, pranked Jay to get views on her vlog. Revenge Prank: Jay gives Britney a winning lottery ticket that turns out to be fake.
17	"The Prank that Gets Botched"	January 7, 2021	0.33
18	"The Prank with Sprinkles on Top"	January 7, 2021	0.30
19	"The Prank with the Pom Poms"	January 14, 2021	0.35
20	"The Prank that Didn't Live Happily Ever After"	January 21, 2021	0.28
21	"The Prank with the Porcupine"	January 28, 2021	0.26
22	"The Prank with the Creepy Caller"	February 4, 2021	0.30
23	"The Prank That Works Out"	February 11, 2021	0.22
24	"The Prank That's a Snap"	February 18, 2021	0.22

== Ratings ==
Viewership and ratings per episode of Revenge Prank
No.	Title	Air date	Rating (18–49)	Viewers (millions)	DVR (18–49)	DVR viewers (millions)	Total (18–49)	Total viewers (millions)	Ref.
1	"The Prank That Fell from the Sky"	June 25, 2020	0.2	0.43	0.1	0.22	0.3	0.65	^{1}
2	"The Prank With the Unexpected Delivery"	June 25, 2020	0.2	0.40	0.1	0.26	0.3	0.66	^{1}
3	"The Prank With the Flash Drive"	July 2, 2020	0.1	0.30	0.1	—N/a	0.2	—N/a	
4	"The Prank With a Pig"	July 2, 2020	0.1	0.30	0.1	—N/a	0.2	—N/a	
5	"The Prank With the Sugar Daddy"	July 9, 2020	0.2	0.41	0.1	0.15	0.3	0.57	^{1}
6	"The Prank With the Tree of Truth"	July 9, 2020	0.2	0.41	0.1	0.18	0.3	0.58	^{1}
7	"The Prank With the Sunlord"	July 16, 2020	0.1	0.30	0.1	—N/a	0.2	—N/a	^{1}
8	"The Prank With the Sidedish"	July 16, 2020	0.1	0.33	0.1	—N/a	0.2	—N/a	^{1}
9	"The Prank With Grizzly"	July 23, 2020	0.1	0.30	0.1	—N/a	0.2	—N/a	^{1}
10	"The Prank That's NSFW"	July 30, 2020	0.2	0.32	—N/a	—N/a	—N/a	—N/a	
11	"The Prank from the Other Side"	August 6, 2020	0.1	0.22	0.1	—N/a	0.2	—N/a	^{1}
12	"The Prank With a Bang"	August 13, 2020	0.1	0.25	—N/a	—N/a	—N/a	—N/a	
13	"The Prank That's Six Feet Under"	August 20, 2020	0.1	0.23	—N/a	—N/a	—N/a	—N/a	
14	"The Prank That Is Off Key"	August 27, 2020	0.1	0.28	—N/a	—N/a	—N/a	—N/a	
15	"The Prank With Piglet"	September 3, 2020	0.1	0.30	—N/a	—N/a	—N/a	—N/a	
16	"The Prank That Hits the Jackpot"	September 10, 2020	0.1	0.19	—N/a	—N/a	—N/a	—N/a	
17	"The Prank that Gets Botched"	January 7, 2021	0.2	0.33	—N/a	—N/a	—N/a	—N/a	
18	"The Prank with Sprinkles on Top"	January 7, 2021	0.2	0.30	—N/a	—N/a	—N/a	—N/a	
19	"The Prank with the Pom Poms"	January 14, 2021	0.2	0.35	—N/a	—N/a	—N/a	—N/a	
20	"The Prank that Didn't Live Happily Ever After"	January 21, 2021	0.1	0.28	TBD	TBD	TBD	TBD	
21	"The Prank with the Porcupine"	January 28, 2021	0.1	0.26	TBD	TBD	TBD	TBD	
22	"The Prank with the Creepy Caller"	February 4, 2021	0.1	0.30	TBD	TBD	TBD	TBD	
23	"The Prank That Works Out"	February 11, 2021	0.1	0.24	TBD	TBD	TBD	TBD	
24	"The Prank That's a Snap"	February 18, 2021	0.1	0.22	TBD	TBD	TBD	TBD	

^1 Live +7 ratings were not available, so Live +3 ratings have been used instead.
