= Downtown Girls =

- Genre: Reality television
- Starring: Shallon Lester; Gurj Bassi; Nikki Laura Cohen; Victoria Eisner; Sarah Klo
- Country of origin: United States
- No. of seasons: 1
- No. of episodes: 6

Production
- Executive producers: Rico Martinez; Dan Lindau; Brooke Posch; Conan Smith

Original release
- Network: MTV
- Release: June 1 – July 6, 2010

Downtown Girls is an MTV reality television series about five girls living in New York City. The series debuted on June 1, 2010.

== Synopsis ==
Five girls discover and discuss love and life in the city that never sleeps. They document their struggles, successes, and failures in their professional lives, as well as their dating lives. While their luck is almost always uncertain, the one thing that is certain is their devotion to each other.

== Episodes ==
No.	Title	Original release date
1	"Recycling Your Ex"	June 1, 2010
2	"Becoming Ms. Right"	June 8, 2010
3	"Dating Outside Of The Box"	June 15, 2010
4	"Working Girl"	June 22, 2010
5	"Tripping Out"	June 29, 2010
6	"Growing Pains"	July 6, 2010
