= Double Shot at Love (2019 TV series) =

- Also known as: Double Shot at Love with DJ Pauly D and Vinny
- Genre: Reality; Dating show
- Created by: SallyAnn Salsano
- Presented by: DJ Pauly D; Vinny Guadagnino
- Country of origin: United States
- Original language: English
- No. of seasons: 3
- No. of episodes: 44

Production
- Executive producers: Dan Caster; Diana Morelli; SallyAnn Salsano; Todd Radnitz
- Production company: 495 Productions

Original release
- Network: MTV
- Release: April 11, 2019 – December 9, 2021

Related
- A Shot at Love with Tila Tequila; A Double Shot at Love with the Ikki Twins

Double Shot at Love is an American reality television show hosted by DJ Pauly D and Vinny Guadagnino from Jersey Shore. The first season, a dating game show spin-off of the original Shot at Love series hosted by Tila Tequila and the Ikki Twins, premiered on MTV on April 11, 2019. This season featured 20 women competing for the attention and affection of both Pauly and Vinny.

The second season, dubbed Vegas Ex-scape, premiered on June 11, 2020, and featured six contestants from the first season, plus three additional male cast members, who moved into Pauly and Vinny's suite at The Linq hotel in Las Vegas, while working at Drai's Beachclub & Nightclub.

The series was renewed for a third season on April 13, 2021. It reverted to the first season's dating show format, with Pauly and Nikki guiding Vinny on the search for his perfect match. The season premiered on September 16, 2021.

== Cast ==
=== Season 1 ===
Contestant	Age	Hometown	Eliminated
Alysse Joyner	24	Brooklyn, New York	Vinny's pick
Nikki Hall	26	Los Angeles, California	Finale
Derynn Paige	25	Franklin Lakes, New Jersey	Finale
Elle Wilson	25	Waverly, Pennsylvania	Finale
Maria Elizondo	22	West New York, New Jersey	Episode 12
Brittnay Dawson	33	Norfolk, Nebraska	Episode 11
Marissa Lucchese	22	Massapequa Park, New York	Episode 10
Susan "Suzi" Baidya	30	Irvine, California	Episode 10
Holly Gurbisz	28	Matawan, New Jersey	Episode 9
Brittani "B-Lashes" Schwartz	27	Lake Grove, New York	Episode 8
Michelle "Mish" Gao	22	Tustin, California	Episode 7
Zuljeily Andino	29	Miami, Florida	Episode 6
Nadya Erazo	29	Pomona, California	Episode 5
Victoria Fryer	25	Long Beach, California	Episode 4
Ashley M Lands	24	New York, New York	Episode 3
Christina Lawrence	29	Los Angeles, California	Episode 3
Deseree Flores	37	Scottsdale, Arizona	Episode 2
Shira Tran	24	New Orleans, Louisiana	Episode 2
Alli Adams	28	Green Bay, Wisconsin	Episode 1
Cate Lapera	27	Staten Island, New York	Episode 1

=== Season 2 ===
- Nikki Hall
- Maria Elizondo
- Derynn Paige
- Marissa Lucchese
- Brittani "B-Lashes" Schwartz
- Suzi Baidya
- Brandon Stakemann
- Antonio Locke
- Nicky Curd

=== Season 3 ===
Contestant	Age	Hometown	Eliminated
Akielia Rucker	28	Moberly, Missouri	Winner
Emily "Peachy" Piccinonno	26	Staten Island, New York	Finale
Erika DeVito	28	Long Island, New York	Finale
Kristen Panarella	29	Staten Island, New York	Episode 11
Danielle Hopson	28	Coconut Creek, Florida	Episode 11
Peyton Freestone	25	College Park, Maryland	Episode 10
Kayla Penoli†	26	Santa Rosa, California	Episode 9
Jovanna Del Plato	30	Farmingdale, New York	Episode 9
Jillian Pantaleo	30	Little Silver, New Jersey	Episode 9
Claudelia Zarate	24	Dallas, Texas	Episode 8
Hanh "Honey" Nguyen	26	Pennsauken, New Jersey	Episode 7
Erica Pecore	25	San Diego, California	Episode 6
Kortni Montgomery	30	New Orleans, Louisiana	Episode 5
Jasmine Jones	28	Atlanta, Georgia	Episode 4
Leanzy Peterson	29	Vallejo, California	Episode 4
Bidisa Chandra	26	Irvine, California	Episode 3
Abigail "Abi" Memoli	27	Raleigh, North Carolina	Episode 3
Kyra Carey	28	Memphis, Tennessee	Episode 2
Kiana Khoshaba	25	Chicago, Illinois	Episode 2

== Episodes ==
=== Series overview ===
Season	Episodes	Originally released	
Season	Episodes	First released	Last released
1	14	April 11, 2019	June 27, 2019
2	18	June 11, 2020	October 8, 2020
3	12	September 16, 2021	December 9, 2021

=== Season 1 (2019) ===
No. overall	No. in season	Title	Original release date	U.S. viewers (millions)
1	1	"Double Trouble, pt 1"	April 11, 2019	0.92
2	2	"Double Trouble, pt 2"	April 11, 2019	0.91
3	3	"Let's Get Ready to Rumble"	April 18, 2019	0.61
4	4	"Hot Heads in Hot Tubs"	April 25, 2019	0.64
5	5	"Swan Songs"	May 2, 2019	0.52
6	6	"Make America Guido Again"	May 9, 2019	0.57
7	7	"Hurricane Angelina"	May 16, 2019	0.73
8	8	"Roller Skating on Thin Ice"	May 23, 2019	0.62
9	9	"Pack Your Baggage"	May 30, 2019	0.63
10	10	"DJs to PJs"	June 6, 2019	0.67
11	11	"In Da Club... With Your Parents"	June 13, 2019	0.75
12	12	"You Can't Handle the Truth"	June 20, 2019	0.72
13	13	"The Final Shot"	June 27, 2019	0.79
14	14	"Reunion"	June 27, 2019	0.66

=== Season 2 (2020) ===
No. overall	No. in season	Title	Original release date	U.S. viewers (millions)
15	1	"Vegas Ex-scape"	June 11, 2020	0.57
16	2	"Don't Be Bitter, Be Better"	June 18, 2020	0.63
17	3	"Mom, I Messed Up"	June 25, 2020	0.48
18	4	"Honey, I'm Home"	July 2, 2020	0.41
19	5	"Here's the Tea"	July 9, 2020	0.56
20	6	"We Got a Situation"	July 16, 2020	0.44
21	7	"DJ Pauly D Day"	July 23, 2020	0.47
22	8	"Strip and Tell"	July 30, 2020	0.51
23	9	"P.S. I Love Pauly"	August 6, 2020	0.45
24	10	"Oh My God, What Did Pauly Say to Her?"	August 13, 2020	0.51
25	11	"The L-word"	August 20, 2020	0.46
26	12	"Not That Kind of Love"	August 27, 2020	0.45
27	13	"Angelina Is Here!"	September 3, 2020	0.55
28	14	"Professional Pot Stirrer"	September 10, 2020	0.46
29	15	"Sealing the Deal"	September 17, 2020	0.44
30	16	"What Happens in Vegas, Stays in Vegas?"	September 24, 2020	0.50
31	17	"Reunion - Part 1"	October 1, 2020	0.43
32	18	"Reunion - Part 2"	October 8, 2020	0.40

=== Season 3 (2021) ===
No. overall	No. in season	Title	Original release date	U.S. viewers (millions)
33	1	"Somebody's Future Wife Is Here"	September 16, 2021	0.35
34	2	"Say Hello To My Ex, Maria"	September 23, 2021	0.27
35	3	"Who's Gonna Kiss Vinny Second"	September 30, 2021	0.31
36	4	"Chicken Buttlet"	October 7, 2021	0.23
37	5	"You Didn't Think Angelina Would Show Up?"	October 14, 2021	0.26
38	6	"Vinny Van Gogh"	October 21, 2021	0.22
39	7	"Look Out For The Quiet Ones"	October 28, 2021	0.27
40	8	"Tea Time With Snooki And JWoww"	November 4, 2021	0.26
41	9	"Vin-Prov"	November 11, 2021	0.24
42	10	"Vinny's New In-Laws"	November 18, 2021	0.33
43	11	"Mom's Cutlets and Nino's Antics"	December 2, 2021	0.25
44	12	"Vinny's Final Shot"	December 9, 2021	0.29
