= The Show with Vinny =

- Genre: Reality; Talk show
- Created by: Jessica Zalkind; SallyAnn Salsano; Vinny Guadagnino
- Starring: Vinny Guadagnino
- Country of origin: United States
- Original language: English
- No. of seasons: 1
- No. of episodes: 11

Production
- Executive producers: Jacquelyn French; Janay Dutton; Jared Hoffman; Jessica Zalkindx; Kara Welker; Pam LaLima; SallyAnn Salsano
- Running time: 21–24 minutes
- Production companies: 495 Productions; Generate Management; MTV Production Development

Original release
- Network: MTV
- Release: May 2 – July 11, 2013

Related
- Jersey Shore; Snooki & Jwoww; The Pauly D Project

The Show with Vinny is an American hybrid talk show reality television series on MTV. The series premiered on May 2, 2013, at 10:00 pm ET/PT.

== Format ==
The series captures Vinny Guadagnino as he invites various celebrities into his home, located in Staten Island, New York, to indulge in a home-cooked Italian meal and a candid conversation with Guadagnino's family. Unlike other talk shows, there is no live studio audience, only Guadagnino's family and friends. Guests included on the show are: Mark Wahlberg, Lil Wayne, Ke$ha, Jenny McCarthy, ASAP Rocky, Whitney Cummings, Anthony Mackie, Ciara, Austin Mahone, Brittany Snow, Kat Graham, Redfoo, Iggy Azalea, Perez Hilton, Victoria Justice, The Saturdays, Jenna Marbles, Erica Mena, MGK, Bella Thorne, Mindless Behavior and Tyler, the Creator.

== Episodes ==
No.	Title/Guests	Original release date	U.S. viewers (millions)
0	"Movie Awards Sneak Peek"	April 14, 2013	1.85
1	Lil Wayne and Jenna Marbles	May 2, 2013	1.19
Lil Wayne is the first guest to visit the Guadagnino home and later the duo goes to the skate park. Jenna Marbles arrives next, and activities include a video chat with Snooki.
2	Victoria Justice and Scott Disick	May 9, 2013	1.02
Vinny takes Victoria Justice to an amusement park. Scott Disick brings his lavish wardrobe to swap with Vinny.
3	Mark Wahlberg, Anthony Mackie and Kesha	May 16, 2013	0.64
Vinny goes to the gym with Mark Wahlberg and Anthony Mackie from the upcoming Michael Bay movie "Pain & Gain." Later, Ke$ha comes over to Vinny's house and before you know it, his crazy Uncle Nino is being doused in green and purple glitter.
4	ASAP Rocky and The Saturdays	May 23, 2013	0.67
A$AP Rocky stops by for an Italian family dinner. Vinny heads to the diner where his mom works for a big American breakfast with British girl group and reality stars The Saturdays.
5	Jenny McCarthy and Mindless Behavior	May 30, 2013	0.72
Paola catches Vinny interviewing Jenny McCarthy in bed and forces them into the living room where they play "Never Have I Ever." Vinny meets Mindless Behavior at a basketball court and before he knows it, a mob of fans arrive.
6	Redfoo and Ciara	June 6, 2013	0.54
Redfoo dresses up the family and teaches everyone how to dance "LMFAO" style. Ciara teaches the family freestyle rapping.
7	MGK and Kat Graham	June 13, 2013	0.66
Vinny introduces MGK to his sister and Kat Graham shows Vinny and the family how to do her dance.
8	Erica Mena and Austin Mahone	June 20, 2013	0.43
Austin Mahone teaches Vinny how to beat box, and Erica Mena also plays a prank on Uncle Nino.
9	Iggy Azalea and Tyler, the Creator	June 27, 2013	0.53
Vinny interviews Iggy Azalea and they have a pizza eating competition. Tyler, the Creator helps Vinny pull a prank on his sister as Tyler fakes having an asthma attack.
10	Whitney Cummings and Bella Thorne	July 11, 2013	0.44
Vinny brings Paola and Uncle Nino to Los Angeles, where he interviews Whitney Cummings poolside and learns how to dance from Bella Thorne, in a tutu no less.
11	Perez Hilton and Brittany Snow	July 11, 2013	0.47
In LA, Perez Hilton tells Vinny how he went from blogger bully to nice guy. Brittany Snow and Vinny get to know each other through a round of speed-dating
