= Made in Staten Island =

American reality television series

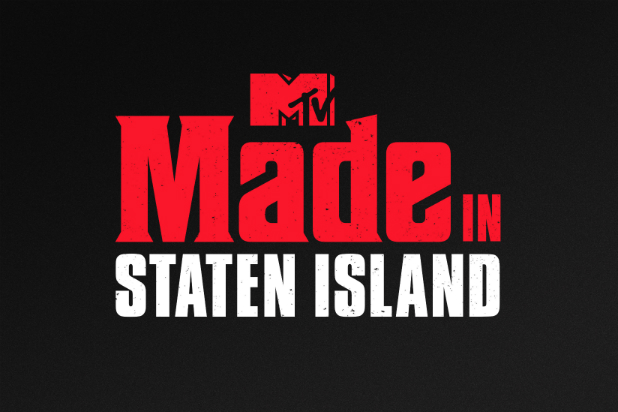
- Genre: Reality
- Country of origin: United States
- Original language: English
- No. of seasons: 1
- No. of episodes: 3 (1 unaired)

Production
- Executive producers: Adam Gonzalez; Karen Gravano; Daniel Blau Rogge; Scotty Gelt
- Production locations: Staten Island, NY

Original release
- Network: MTV
- Release: January 14 – January 28, 2019

Related
- Families of the Mafia

Made in Staten Island is an American reality television series that premiered on MTV on January 14, 2019. The show followed eight young adults living in Staten Island, trying to avoid the influence of local organized crime. The program was described as "Mob Wives for the MTV crowd". It was the network's second attempt to create a Staten Island-focused reality series, after 2010's aborted Bridge & Tunnel.

The show only aired three episodes all together before the series was quietly ended; all mention of the series has also been expunged from MTV's websites.

In March 2020, MTV announced that it did continue to work with the subjects of Made in Staten Island, but had decided to take a different focus and shift more to showing their families in full. The new version of the series, Families of the Mafia, premiered on April 9, 2020.

== Cast members ==
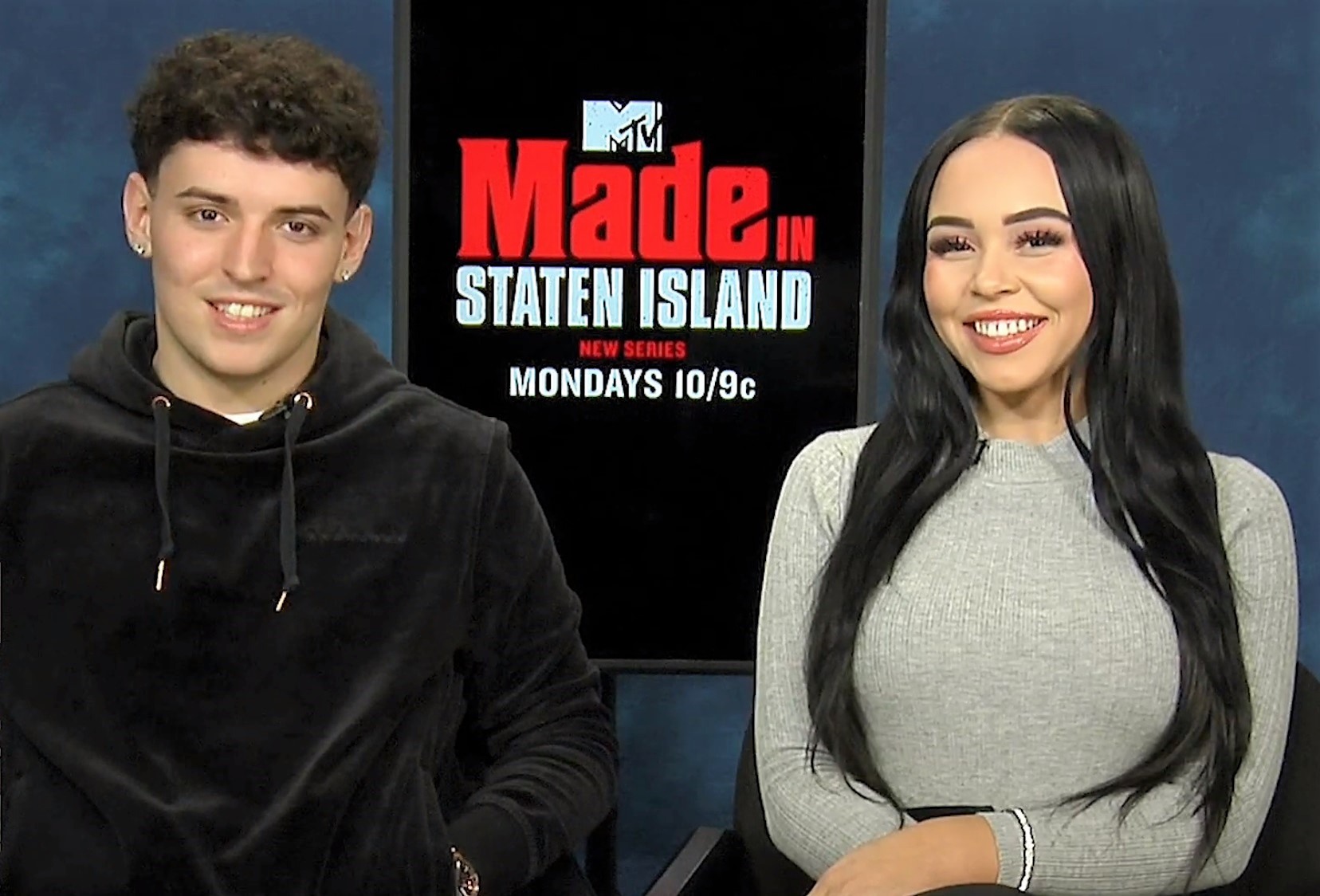
Christian Patterson and Karina Seabrook interviewed in 2019

- Karina Seabrook
- Paulie Fusco
- Kayla Gonzalez
- Christian "CP" Patterson
- Dennie Augustine
- Taylor O'Toole
- Joe O'Toole
- Jordan "Bones" James

== Episodes ==
No.	Title	Original release date	U.S. viewers (millions)
1	"Born and Bred"	January 14, 2019	0.48
2	"Breaking the Code"	January 21, 2019	0.40
3	"Street Life vs. Straight Life"	January 28, 2019	0.36
4	"Street and Narrow"	unaired	N/A
