= Like We Care =

Television series

Like We Care is an MTV news program that debuted in 1992 that was geared towards high school students.

Through research using focus groups, MTV found that a narrator reading the news turned young people off, so the programme was voiced by people of a similar age to the target audience. Similarly, the show was presented using slang that would make viewers more comfortable, and topics were of interest to teenagers.

The theme song was performed by Pop's Cool Love.
