= Snooki =

American reality television personality (born 1987)

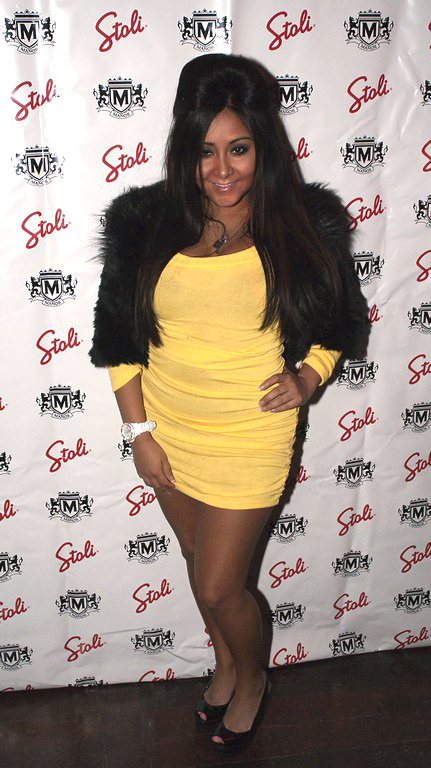
- Snooki in 2011
- Born: Nicole Elizabeth Polizzi; November 23, 1987 (age 38); Santiago, Chile
- Education: Brookdale Community College
- Occupation: Reality television personality
- Years active: 2009–present
- Spouse: Jionni LaValle (m. 2014)
- Children: 3
- Website: snookinicole.com

Nicole Elizabeth LaValle (née Polizzi; born November 23, 1987), best known by her nickname Snooki (/ˈsnʊki/ SNUUK-ee), is an American reality television personality. She is best known for being a cast member of the MTV reality show Jersey Shore and starring in its subsequent spin-offs Snooki & Jwoww and Jersey Shore: Family Vacation. Upon appearing on Jersey Shore in 2009, Snooki gained popularity, leading to numerous talk show appearances, web and television series participation and hosting, and a large social media following. She reportedly earned $150,000 per Jersey Shore episode by the last season. She also appeared as the guest hostess for WWE Raw in 2011 and competed at WrestleMania XXVII that same year.

== Early life and education ==
Polizzi was born in Santiago, Chile. She was adopted when she was six months old and was raised by Italian-American parents, Andy and Helen Polizzi. Polizzi has taken two DNA tests to determine her genetic background. In 2014, the first DNA test stated that she had European, Asian and Jewish ancestry. Five years later, in January 2019, she took another DNA test which stated that she is of Native Chilean and European descent. Polizzi’s father is a volunteer firefighter and auto-salvage supervisor, and her mother is an office manager. Polizzi grew up in Marlboro, New York, although she has identified herself publicly as coming from the better known nearby city of Poughkeepsie and even has called herself the "Princess of Poughkeepsie." Polizzi claims she said this in order to keep paparazzi from visiting her mother's home in Marlboro.

Polizzi received her nickname, Snooki, in middle school, when her friends named her after "Snookie", a male character in Save the Last Dance, because she was the first of her friends to kiss a boy. She grew up and attended school in Marlboro, New York, where she was a cheerleader. During high school, she suffered from an eating disorder, at one point weighing 80 pounds (36 kg).

Snooki attended Marlboro High School in Marlboro. After graduating, she attended Brookdale Community College in Middletown Township, New Jersey, where she studied to become a veterinary technician.

== Career ==
=== Reality television ===
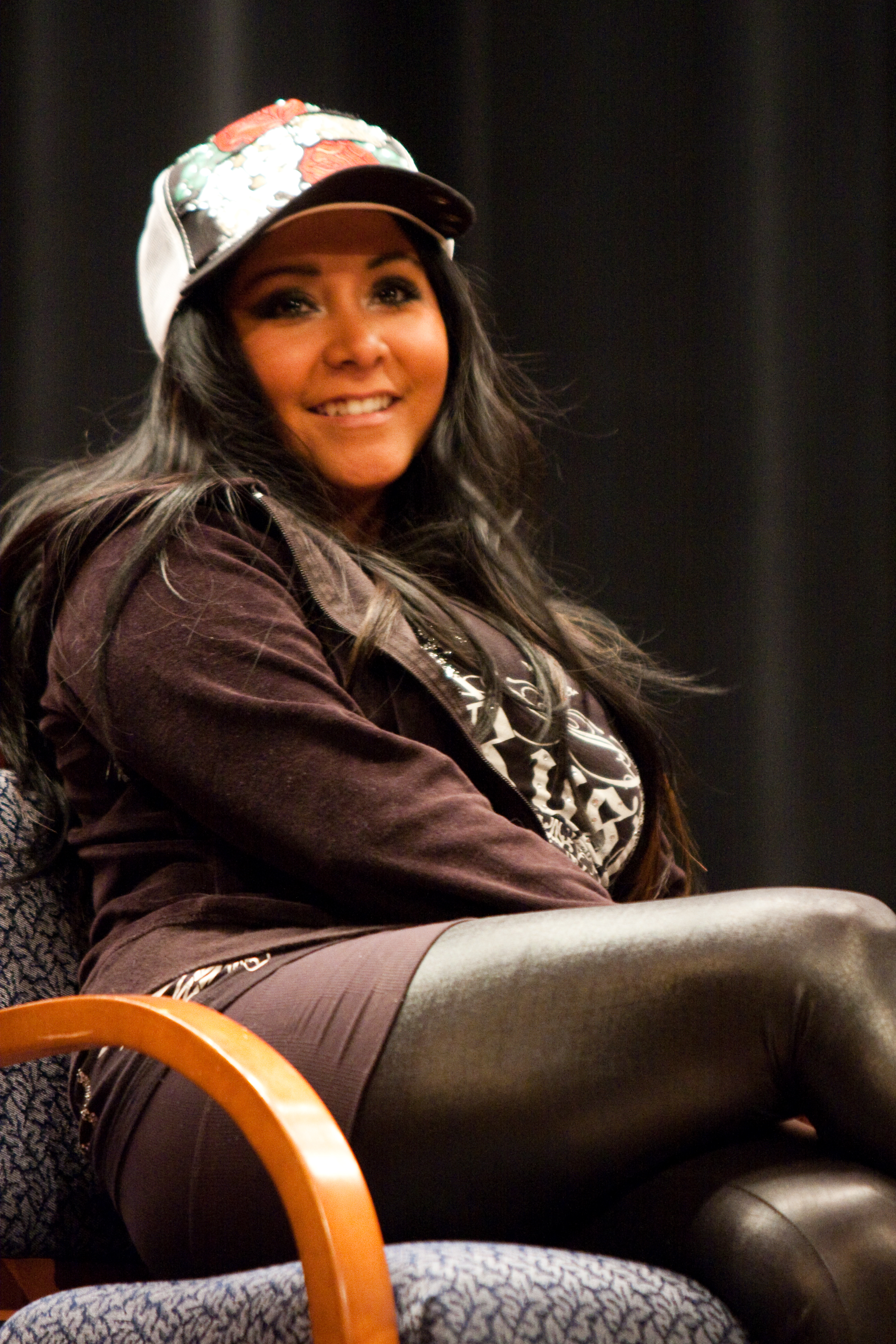
Snooki in 2010

MTV first introduced Snooki in Is She Really Going Out with Him?, a show that focused on women dating obnoxious or arrogant men. Snooki and her boyfriend, Justin, appeared in episode 14, "Jerz Pud".

Snooki became part of the reality TV series Jersey Shore after being scouted by the casting director, Josh Allouche, an employee of Doron Ofir Casting. The New York Times identified her as "the breakout member of the cast". According to The New York Times, her actions on the show have caused her to be the target of public disdain while having a "strange appeal". One reported measure of her appeal was that she was one of the most popular celebrity Halloween costumes of 2010. At the height of the show's popularity, Snooki was reportedly earning $150,000 per episode.

While shooting in Seaside Heights, Snooki was punched in the face by New York City school gym teacher Brad Ferro. The punch, while shown in previews, was blacked out during showings of the episode. Videos of the punch went viral on YouTube and were featured in many news media. After the punch was made public, Snooki's appearance fees increased from $2,000 per event to $10,000 per event.

In 2011, Snooki and her Jersey Shore costar, Jennifer Farley, signed a contract to star in a spin-off show, Snooki & Jwoww, which premiered on MTV in June 2012. The first season followed Snooki and Farley moving in together, and they describe their show like a modern-day Laverne & Shirley. 495 Productions filmed the first season over the course of six weeks, at a former two-story firehouse located near Grove and Mercer Streets in Jersey City, New Jersey. The second season relocated to the stars' actual permanent residences and began airing on January 8, 2013. This season had an expanded one-hour episode format. The March 2012 confirmation of Snooki's pregnancy raised speculation as to how the creative direction of her spin-off would be affected, as she would be unable to engage in the "hard-partying, booze-swilling" antics that had previously garnered high ratings for MTV. The show chronicled her days in pregnancy and early years in motherhood and ran for four seasons before concluding in February 2015.

On September 4, 2013, it was announced on Good Morning America that Snooki would compete on the 17th season of Dancing with the Stars, partnered with newcomer Sasha Farber. They were eliminated on October 28, 2013, coming in 8th place despite receiving good scores and comments from the judges.

In early 2016, Snooki starred with her husband on the f.y.i. series Nicole & Jionni's Shore Flip. Since November 2015, Snooki has starred with Farley on the web series Snooki & Jwoww: Moms With Attitude produced by AwesomenessTV. The show wrapped its second season in late 2017. On January 28, 2016, it was announced that she would be a contestant on The New Celebrity Apprentice.

=== Other television appearances ===
Snooki was a presenter at the 2010 CMT Music Awards. On July 27, 2010, the cast of Jersey Shore appeared at the New York Stock Exchange, and Snooki rang the opening bell. Snooki and the cast of Jersey Shore appeared at the 2010 MTV Video Music Awards on September 12, 2010. Snooki also appeared on TLC's Cake Boss episode "Snookie, Super Anthony & a Ship" on November 8, 2010, in which she orders a cake for her mom. On November 7, 2010, Snooki appeared at the MTV Europe Music Awards in Madrid, Spain. She was subsequently parodied in the South Park episode "It's a Jersey Thing", and is frequently parodied on Saturday Night Live by actor Bobby Moynihan. She also hosted the MTV New Year's special MTV's Club New Year's Eve 2013, with Jwoww and Jeff Dye, on December 31, 2012, from Times Square, to ring in 2013.

Snooki made an appearance on the March 14, 2011, episode of WWE Monday Night Raw, where she had a segment with John Morrison, Vickie Guerrero and Dolph Ziggler. During the segment, she slapped Vickie, starting a feud with the couple. Later at night, she got into a brawl with LayCool, which led to the formation of a six-person Mixed Tag Team match at WrestleMania XXVII. Snooki made an appearance on the March 28, 2011, episode of WWE Monday Night Raw in a segment where Snooki introduces Trish Stratus to the Jersey Shore, where they started a street fight with LayCool in a bar. At Wrestlemania, Snooki and her partners Trish Stratus and John Morrison won the match. On December 12, 2011, on WWE RAW, she was awarded the WWE 2011 A-Lister of the Year Slammy Award which she accepted via satellite.

=== Other ventures ===
In January 2011, Snooki's book, A Shore Thing, was released; it described her search for love on the boardwalk. Despite a promotional campaign that included appearances by Snooki on The View, The Ellen DeGeneres Show, Jimmy Kimmel Live!, and the Late Show with David Letterman, the book was not a sales success. It sold approximately 9,000 copies within its first month of release, during which it accumulated 16 one-star customer reviews on Amazon.com. One publishing executive said the book sold poorly because "rather than a tell-all, it was disguised as a novel."

In April 2011, Snooki was paid $32,000 to speak at Rutgers University. Topics she spoke about included what being a celebrity is like and what she thinks is important in school, including the advice: "Study hard, but party harder". Some students complained the school's money would have been better used on speakers other than Snooki. Rutgers spokesman Steve Manas responded that the extension of the invitation to Snooki resulted from canvassing by students, who indicated whom they wanted to invite. Over 1,000 people attended Snooki's engagement.

On October 25, 2011, Snooki's second book, Confessions of a Guidette, was released with Gallery Books. The book was marketed as a part-memoir, part-guide of how to "rock it Jersey-style.

Snooki's third book, Gorilla Beach, was released on May 15, 2012. It is a sequel to Snooki's first book, A Shore Thing.

In January 2012, Snooki's Team Snooki Boxing co-promoted a cooperative venture with Final Round Promotions, a boxing card at Resorts Casino Hotel in Atlantic City, featuring Irish featherweight boxer Patrick Hyland fighting and winning in the main event before a capacity crowd. Hyland's two brothers Eddie and Paul, also boxers, appeared in preliminary bouts. The event attracted considerable publicity in the boxing press.

== Personal life ==
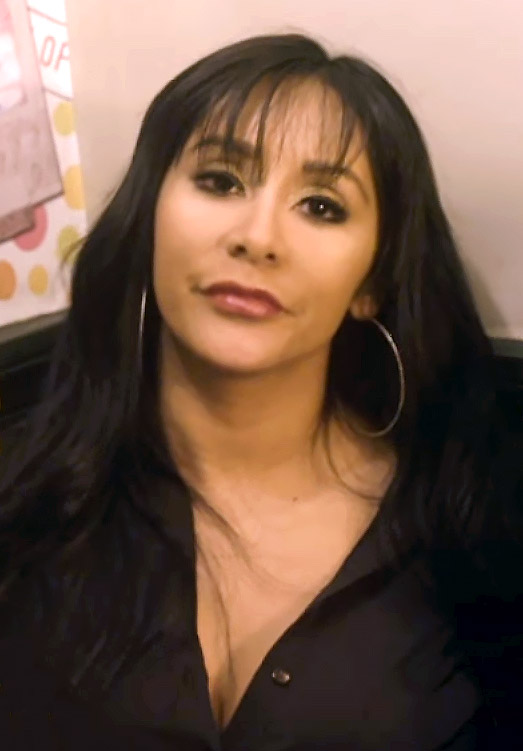
Snooki in 2018

Snooki lives in Florham Park, New Jersey.

In March 2012, Snooki announced her engagement to Jionni LaValle. Snooki gave birth to the couple's first child, Lorenzo Dominic LaValle, on August 26, 2012. Snooki appeared on the front page of the March 2013 issue of Us Weekly, claiming to have lost 42 pounds post pregnancy.

Her second child, Giovanna Marie LaValle, was born September 26, 2014. On November 29, 2014, Snooki married Jionni LaValle.

In October 2016, Snooki announced she had had a breast augmentation to obtain a C cup. On May 30, 2019, Snooki gave birth to her third child, Angelo James LaValle.

In January 2026, Snooki revealed that doctors found cancerous cells on top of her cervix and she had been dealing with abnormal pap smears results for four years. She explained that she may need a possible hysterectomy if her second biopsy results came back abnormal. On February 20, she confirmed she was diagnosed with Stage 1 cervical cancer and underwent a colposcopy, followed by a biopsy.

=== Legal proceedings ===
On July 30, 2010, Snooki was arrested in Seaside Heights, New Jersey for disturbing the peace, disorderly conduct, and criminal annoyance of others. In a September 8 plea bargain in which the latter two charges were dropped, Judge Damian G. Murray sentenced her to a $500 fine and community service. In handing down the sentence, he characterized Snooki as "a Lindsay Lohan wannabe". Her arrest was filmed during production of season three of Jersey Shore and later seen on the show.

On May 31, 2011, in Florence, Italy, Snooki was briefly taken into custody by local police after the car she was driving collided with a parked traffic police car. According to Italian police, Snooki was cited and released. Two police officers sustained minor injuries.

In late 2011, Snooki sued SRG Ventures, a licensing company she had signed with a year earlier to bring out Snooki-branded merchandise such as watches, shoes, lingerie, and school supplies, for breach of contract. She alleged the company had failed to adequately seek such licensing opportunities. The company countersued, alleging she and her manager had undermined its efforts by negotiating directly with manufacturers and delaying their decisions.

== Filmography ==
Year	Title	Role	Notes
2009	Is She Really Going Out with Him?	Herself	Episode 14: "Jerz Pud"
2009–2012	Jersey Shore	Herself	Main cast, 6 seasons
2010	When I Was 17	Herself	Season 1, Ep. 10
2010	Cake Boss	Herself	Season 3, Ep. 21: "Snookie, Super Anthony & a Ship"
2011	WWE Raw/WrestleMania 27	Herself	3 episodes: Mar 14, Mar 28, Dec 12 1 match at WrestleMania: Apr 3
2011	Silent Library	Herself	Episode "Jersey Shore"
2012–2015	Snooki & Jwoww	Herself	Main cast, 4 seasons
2012	The Three Stooges	Herself	Cameo
2012	MTV's Club New Year's Eve 2013	Herself	Hosted with JWoww & Jeff Dye
2013	Movie 43	Herself	Cameo
2013	MTV's ChallengeMania: Road to Rivals II	Co-host	Hosted with Kenny Santucci
2013	Dancing with the Stars	Contestant	Season 17
2014	Supernatural	Herself	Episode: "Blade Runners"
2015–2017	Snooki & Jwoww: Moms with Attitude	Herself	web series
2016	Hollywood Medium with Tyler Henry	Herself	Season 1, Episode 2
2016	Nicole & Jionni's Shore Flip	Herself	Main cast
2016	Hollywood Medium with Tyler Henry	Herself	Season 2, Episode 1
2017	The New Celebrity Apprentice	Contestant	Season 8; finished in 13th place
2018–2026	Jersey Shore: Family Vacation	Herself	Main (seasons 1-3, 5–8), Recurring (season 4)
2018	Celebrity Fear Factor	Contestant	
2018–2019	How Far Is Tattoo Far?	Host	2 seasons
2019	Hollywood Medium whit Tyler Henry	Herself	Season 4, Episode 5
2020	Ridiculousness	Herself	Season 16, Episode 28
2020	Celebrity Family Feud	Herself	Season 7, Episode 4
2021	Floribama Shore	Herself	Season 4, Episode 14 & 15, Hosted with JWoww
2021	Cribs	Herself	Guest
2021–2022	Messyness	Host	Main
2023	All Star Shore	Narrator	Season 2
2024	Last Week Tonight with John Oliver	Herself	Guest, Season 11, Episode 5
2026–present	Canada Shore	Boss	Season 1

== Awards and nominations ==
Year	Award	Category	Result
2010	Teen Choice Awards	"Choice TV: Female Reality/Variety Star"	Nominated
2011	Teen Choice Awards	"Choice TV: Female Reality/Variety Star"	Nominated
2011	WWE Slammy Awards	"A-Lister of the Year"	Won
2013	Razzie Awards	"Worst Screen Couple" (shared with any combination of two cast members from Jersey Shore)	Nominated
