= American Reality Television Awards =

Annual TV awards in United States

- Awarded for: Excellence for on screen and behind the scenes of reality television
- Country: United States
- Presented by: Academy of Reality Television
- First award: 2013
- Website: www.realitytelevisionawards.com

The American Reality Television Awards, also known as The ARTAS, is a set of annual awards that were created by Kristen Moss and Andrew Ward in 2013. It is presented by the Academy of Reality Television and is the first awards show to recognize talent on screen and behind the scenes of reality television.

In November 2023, the 10th Annual ARTAS Show was held, and it received more than two million votes in all categories.

== History ==
The ARTAS was founded by executive producers Kristen Moss and Andrew Ward with the intention of supporting, examining, and redefining the art of reality in media by rewarding quality, promoting experimentation, and acknowledging that the audience is at the center of the entertainment industry.

In 2013, the first awards were given out for excellence in front of and behind the camera in all aspects of unscripted television. Since then, the awards have been presented to recognize and promote the vast array of content that has brought reality television to the forefront of entertainment.

In 2014, the American Reality Television Awards also inaugurated a Humanitarian Award, which eventually became the Reality Television Hall of Fame. This award's notable honorees include former President Donald Trump, Heidi Montag, Spencer Pratt, and Janice Dickinson. Ellen DeGeneres, Steve Harvey, Leah Remini, Julia Louis-Dreyfus, Gordon Ramsay, Abby Lee Miller, and RuPaul are among the notable figures who have won trophies in various categories for all nine ARTAS Awards.

In 2021, Chayce Beckham received ARTAS Award for Outstanding Judging Panel.

In 2023, The American Reality Television Awards were honored to be awarded 3 Telly Awards in the categories of Online Entertainment, Social Video General, and Non-Broadcast Low Budget.

=== 10th American Reality Television Awards (2023) ===
The 10th Annual ARTAS premiered on December 19, 2023, exclusively on YouTube. Paramount+’s RuPaul’s Drag Race emerged as the leading winner with three awards, including Overall Show, while FOX’s The Masked Singer won Outstanding Competition Show and Selena Gomez was honored as Reality Royalty for MAX’s Selena + Chef. The event introduced new categories such as Outstanding Travel Series and True Crime Series and featured appearances by RuPaul Charles, Heather McDonald, Matt Iseman, Jack Osbourne, Trixie Mattel, and the cast of Jersey Shore.

=== 11th American Reality Television Awards (2024) ===
11th annual ARTAS premiered on November 29, 2024 across a wide array of channels and platforms, including The Roku Channel, Xumo, TrillerTV, and YouTube. The awards were hosted by Heather McDonald, who won the ARTAS the year before in “Outstanding Podcast” category, along with numerous presenters such as JoJo Siwa, Gleb Savchenko, Omarosa, AJ McLean, and others.

== Hosts ==
- Michelle Visage (1st Annual)
- Matt Iseman (2nd Annual)
- Jonathan Bennett (3rd Annual)
- Melissa Peterman (4th Annual)
- Matt Iseman (5th Annual)
- Rachel Reilly (6th Annual)
- Renee Young (7th Annual)
- Kel Mitchell (8th Annual)
- Vivica A. Fox (9th Annual)
- Heather McDonald (11th annual)

== Award recipients ==
Year	Category	Winners	Ref.
2013	Humanitarian Award	Gillian Larson	
2013	Production Company	Mark Burnett Productions	
2013	Overall Show	The Voice	
2013	Host/Hostess	Ryan Seacrest – American Idol	
2013	Docu-Series	Duck Dynasty	
2014	Humanitarian Award	Donald Trump	
2014	Production Company	One Three Media	
2014	Overall Show	Deadliest Catch	
2014	Host/Hostess	Betty White	
2014	Docu-Series	Pit Bulls & Parolees	
2015	Hall of Fame	Heidi Montag and Spencer Pratt	
2015	Production Company	Original Productions	
2015	Overall Show	Hell's Kitchen	
2015	Host/Hostess	Gordon Ramsay	
2015	Docu-Series	Vanderpump Rules	
2016	Hall of Fame	Janice Dickinson	
2016	Production Company	ITV Entertainment	
2016	Overall Show	ITV Entertainment	
2016	Host/Hostess	Todd Chrisley	
2016	Docu-Series	Little Women: LA	
2017–2018	Production Company	44 Blue Productions	
2017–2018	Overall Show	America's Got Talent	
2017–2018	Host/Hostess	Leah Remini	
2017–2018	Docu-Series	Vanderpump Rules	
2019	Production Company	Fly on the Wall Productions	
2019	Overall Show	Pit Bulls & Parolees	
2019	Host/Hostess	Steve Harvey – Celebrity Family Feud	
2019	Docu-Series	Jersey Shore: Family Vacation	
2020	Production Company	495 Productions	
2020	Overall Show	Hell's Kitchen	
2020	Host/Hostess	Dwayne Johnson	
2020	Docu-Series	I Am Jazz	
2021	Production Company	Sony Pictures Entertainment	
2021	Overall Show	90 Day Fiancé	
2021	Host/Hostess	Wayne Brady, Let's Make A Deal	
2021	Docu-Series	Married to Medicine	
2022	Best Overall Show	The Bachelor	
2022	Outstanding Production Company	Sony Pictures Television	
2022	Outstanding Docu-Series	Men in Kilts	
2022	Outstanding Host	Valerie Bertinelli, Valerie's Home Cooking	
2022	Hall of Fame Winner	Tiffany "New York" Pollard	
2023	Overall Show	RuPaul's Drag Race All Stars	
2023	Outstanding Production Company	Warner Bros.	
2023	Outstanding Docu-Series	Trixie Motel	
2023	Outstanding Host	RuPaul, RuPaul's Drag Race All Stars	
2024	Best Overall Show	RuPaul’s Drag Race	
2024	Outstanding Production Company	Warner Bros.	
2024	Outstanding Docu-Series	Vanderpump Rules	
2024	Outstanding Host	Jeff Probst, Survivor	
