= Chris Cardillo =

American film producer

- Born: New Jersey, U.S.
- Education: Rowan University
- Occupations: Film producer; businessman; actor
- Years active: 2005–present

Chris Cardillo, also known as J. Fontaine, is an American film producer, businessman, and former actor. Alongside his brother Nick, Cardillo is the co-owner and CEO of Castle Windows, a New Jersey–based window repair and construction company.

== Early life and education ==
Cardillo grew up in New Jersey, the son of Christopher Cardillo Sr., a businessman. He began his interest in filmmaking as a child. He earned a Bachelor of Science in Marketing from Rowan University in 1998.

== Career ==
In 2005, he and his brother Nick purchased Castle Windows from their father. The Cardillo brothers expanded the business into over a dozen U.S. states and a US$75 million annual revenue.

He made his film career debut in 2015 with The Grievance Group, in which he performed acting, writing, production duties. The same year, The Mint was released, a semi-biographical film based on Cardillo's record production career as J. Fontaine, where he started alongside JWoww.

In 2022, he acquired the trademark rights to the department store chain Hills.

== Personal life ==
Cardillo has an interest in toy collecting, as a partner with gaming company Coleco.

== Filmography ==
=== As actor ===
Year	Title	Role	Notes
2014–2016	The Grievance Group	Shackles	Film series
2015	The Mint	J. Fontaine	Comedy
2016	Vinyl	Music	Television series
2018	Cold	Scott	Drama
2018	Worthless	Limo Driver	Drama

=== As producer ===
Year	Title	Role	Notes
2014–2016	The Grievance Group	Executive producer	The Pardon, Unfinished Business, A Life for a Life
2015	The Mint	Producer	
2016	Fight Valley	Associate producer	
2017	Power of Grayskull	Associate producer	
2018	Worthless	Producer	
2018	Cold	Producer	
2019	The Dark Military	Associate producer	
2022	By Deception	Executive producer	
2023	Called to Duty	Producer	
2024	Second Chance City	Director	
