= List of Snooki & Jwoww episodes =

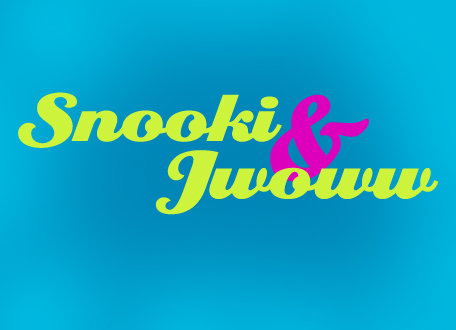
On-air logo

Snooki & Jwoww is an American reality television series on MTV starring Nicole "Snooki" Polizzi and Jennifer "JWoww" Farley, a spinoff of Jersey Shore. The first season featured Polizzi and Farley living together in a former firehouse in Jersey City, New Jersey. A second season was confirmed on August 3, 2012. The format expanded to one hour, and was filmed in Manchester, New Jersey. It premiered January 8, 2013. MTV confirmed a third season on April 25, 2013. On October 8, 2014, MTV confirmed season 4 would be the final season of the series, which premiered on Wednesday, November 5 at 10/9c.

== Series overview ==
Season	Episodes	Originally released	
Season	Episodes	First released	Last released
1	12	June 21, 2012	September 13, 2012
2	12	January 8, 2013	April 2, 2013
3	12	October 22, 2013	January 14, 2014
4	12	November 5, 2014	February 4, 2015

== Episodes ==
=== Season 1 (2012) ===
No. overall	No. in season	Title	Original release date	US viewers (millions)
-	-	"Best Friends Forever"	May 31, 2012	N/A
A recap of Snooki and JWoww's friendship at the Jersey Shore.
1	1	"Sorry Neighbors, Cause These Bitches Are Moving In"	June 21, 2012	2.36
Snooki and JWoww look for houses to move into together, which Roger and Snooki's father are skeptical about. Meanwhile, Snooki is scared to tell JWoww that she is pregnant and engaged, because she might call the whole thing off.
2	2	"What Did I Get Myself Into?"	June 28, 2012	2.06
Snooki tells JWoww that she is pregnant and engaged, which leaves her stunned. JWoww is now considering not moving in now. The two of them think it over and end up moving in together.
3	3	"It Looks Like a Little Meatball"	July 5, 2012	2.04
Snooki gets an ultrasound of her fetus. She and JWoww also decorate their home. Later, it is revealed that the OB/GYN's office simply entered the wrong name.
4	4	"Guess Who's Coming To Dinner"	July 12, 2012	=1.70
Snooki and JWoww invite over their Jersey Shore castmates for dinner, but struggle through last minute renovations to the house before they arrive. Snooki reveals her engagement and pregnancy to them over dinner.
5	5	"Sober Party of One"	July 19, 2012	1.73
When the ladies throw a housewarming party at their apartment, Snooki is upset when their Jersey Shore co-stars give Snooki a hard time for being pregnant and engaged and JWoww isn't supportive of her. Snooki is further isolated by being the only sober one at the party.
6	6	"Calm Down, Hormonal"	July 26, 2012	1.81
Snooki volunteers at a day care center for dogs. JWoww and Roger's relationship experiences conflict.
7	7	"Meet the In-Laws"	August 2, 2012	1.59
Snooki meets Jionni's parents, and brings along JWoww and Roger for support.
8	8	"Cancun Is Not An Island"	August 9, 2012	1.61
The girls head to Cancun for vacation with their best friends. JWoww intends to have fun, while Snooki finds it difficult to relax during her pregnancy.
9	9	"Sitting Alone In A Hotel Room Sucks"	August 16, 2012	1.59
The girls' friendship is tested by an argument in Cancun. Roger and JWoww's get into a fights about her past relationships. Jionni thinks Snooki may not be ready for motherhood after her accusations about his commitment.
10	10	"Couples Hell"	August 23, 2012	2.21
The conflict between JWoww and Rodger continues, as does the tension between Snooki and Jionni. Meanwhile, Jionni celebrates his birthday.
11	11	"My Baby is Boring!"	August 30, 2012	1.64
Snooki and JWoww take care of two fake babies and Snooki finds out the gender of her real baby.
12	12	"The End?"	September 13, 2012	1.55
In the season finale, Snooki and JWoww trade boyfriends.

=== Season 2 (2013) ===
No. overall	No. in season	Title	Original release date	US viewers (millions)
13	1	"New Beginnings"	January 8, 2013	2.08
Jionni and Snooki hold a baby shower for their soon-to-be-born child, with Jersey Shore castmates, Deena and Sammi in attendance. Jenni starts to become accustomed to living with Roger.
14	2	"Pregnant Problems"	January 15, 2013	1.57
Jenni attempts to provide hints to Roger that she wants him to propose, while Snooki finds her pregnancy difficult.
15	3	"Last Call at Club Uterus"	January 22, 2013	2.10
Snooki ends up going into early labor. Jenni is embarrassed after her father tries to makes a pass at her friends at a family barbecue.
16	4	"Now What?"	January 29, 2013	1.92
Jenni and Roger head up north to visit Roger's family in Maine. Snooki and Jionni are putting their new baby knowledge to the test.
17	5	"Maine Squeeze"	February 5, 2013	1.67
Jenni proves to Roger that she can handle the outdoors. Roger later reveals some private information. Snooki and Jionni are left exhausted while taking care of Lorenzo.
18	6	"The Honeymoon Is Over"	February 12, 2013	1.60
Roger realizes the true extent of his feelings for Jenni, while Snooki and Jionni's new status as parents taxes their relationship.
19	7	"Turning Over a New League"	February 19, 2013	1.70
Snooki and Jionni try to get their relationship back on track, and Jenni thinks about having her mother meet Roger.
20	8	"Between a Rock and a Hard Place"	February 26, 2013	1.60
Snooki and Jionni go on their first date since having the baby, Roger goes engagement ring shopping, and JWoww gets an indecent proposal.
21	9	"Taking the Plunge"	March 12, 2013	1.71
Roger plays some pranks on Jenni prior to his proposal.
22	10	"I'm a Good Fiancé and I'm a Mom!"	March 19, 2013	1.48
Snooki and Jenni enjoy a girls night out while Jionni and Roger have a "Dadchelor" party.
23	11	"I Might Not Be Engaged After This"	March 26, 2013	1.57
Roger and Jionni are displeased when they receive news about the events that occurred during Snooki and Jenni's night out.
24	12	"All's Well That Ends Well?"	April 2, 2013	1.70
The Jersey Shore roommates come over to celebrate Jenni and Roger's engagement.

=== Season 3 (2013–14) ===
No. overall	No. in season	Title	Original release date	US viewers (millions)
-	-	"The World According to Snooki & JWOWW"	October 14, 2013	N/A
Snooki and Jenni sit down with Jessimae from Girl Code to discuss their childhoods and lives growing up. Later, a preview of what's to come on season three.
25	1	"We're Back Bitches"	October 22, 2013	1.77
Snooki and Jionni disclose their plans for a summer house to Jionni's mom. Jenni persuades Roger to attend couples therapy.
26	2	"Movin' On Up!"	October 29, 2013	1.23
Snooki and Jionni move out of the basement at Jionni's parents house. Jenni works on training her dogs to become service animals.
27	3	"Mommy"	November 5, 2013	0.88
Snooki starts her search for a babysitter for Lorenzo. Jenni and Roger invite Snooki and Jionni visit the Pennhurst State School and Hospital.
28	4	"Liars!"	November 12, 2013	0.96
Jenni and Snooki drive to Atlantic City for a girls weekend getaway. Jionni's left to watch Lorenzo but ends up leaving the baby with Janis so he and Roger can go paintballing.
29	5	"I Want a Veil!"	November 19, 2013	1.15
While Jenni and Snooki are shopping for wedding dresses, Jenni comes to the conclusion that she's ready for marriage.
30	6	"Let the Planning Begin!"	November 26, 2013	0.81
As Snooki begins to plan her wedding, she's already exhausted. Jenni and Roger attend an adoption fair.
31	7	"Baby Boot Camp"	December 3, 2013	0.99
Jenni wants to see how good of a father Roger will be so Snooki and Jenni put Roger through baby boot camp. Jionni and Roger go on the hunt to purchase a swing set for Lorenzo.
32	8	"Oui Can Cook!"	December 10, 2013	0.76
Snooki and Jenni volunteer in a charity dog wash. Jionni and Roger plan a double date.
33	9	"Welcome to the Dude Ranch!"	December 17, 2013	0.80
Both couples take a trip to the nearest dude ranch. While Snooki and Jenni would like the trip to be romantic, Jionni and Roger spend their time pranking the girls.
34	10	"What a Drag!"	January 7, 2014	0.76
Snooki reviews the results of her DNA test. Jenni's dogs take their last test to receive their service animal certificate. Jenni invites the Joeys over to have a drag party.
35	11	"Couples Weekend"	January 7, 2014	0.90
Snooki and Jenni invite their Jersey Shore roommates over for a couples weekend.
36	12	"My Baby Is Growing Up!"	January 14, 2014	0.84
Snooki and Jionni host a party to celebrate Lorenzo's first birthday. Roger blatantly asks Jenni about her stance on marriage.
-	-	"The Not-Yet-Wed Game"	January 14, 2014	0.86
Snooki, Jenni, Jionni, and Roger play a game to see who knows each other best.

=== Season 4 (2014–15) ===
No. overall	No. in season	Title	Original release date	US viewers (millions)
37	1	"We're Back, and We're Pregnant!"	November 5, 2014	0.85
Pregnant Snooki and Jenni are neighbors for the summer; Roger and Jionni grow close while attending a birthing class
38	2	"That's Not Very Namaste of You"	November 12, 2014	0.90
Snooki and Jenni attend a pre-natal yoga session; Jionni is plagued by Lorenzo's "terrible twos." Snooki throws Jenni a Surprise baby shower.
39	3	"And Baby Makes Six"	November 19, 2014	0.79
Snooki helps Jenni prepare for her baby's arrival; Jionni warns Roger about the delivery; Jenni goes into labor and changes her mind about the epidural. Note: this episode originally aired as a 70 minutes episode.
40	4	"Welcome Home, Meilani!"	November 26, 2014	0.95
Jenni and Roger get used to life as new parents; Snooki and Jionni plan an elaborate party. Note: this episode originally aired as a 70 minutes episode.
41	5	"Got Gatsby?"	December 3, 2014	0.75
Snooki finds her inner bridezilla while planning a Gatsby-themed bridal shower. Note: this episode originally aired as a 70 minutes episode.
42	6	"I Feel Like A Pregnant Virgin"	December 10, 2014	0.86
Snooki shows Jenni her wedding gown; Jionni's parents visit; problems for Jenni and Roger. Note: this episode originally aired as a 70 minutes episode.
43	7	"Little Hos on the Prairie"	December 17, 2014	0.76
Jenni and Roger work through issues with being new parents; Snooki and Jionni have a garden war. Note: this episode originally aired as a 75 minute episode.
44	8	"Summer's Over....Back to the Basement"	January 7, 2015	0.79
Jenni gets a makeover and takes her family on a camping trip; Snooki and Jionni begin to decorate.
45	9	"It's Like a Rollercoaster of Pain"	January 14, 2015	0.80
Snooki and Jionni are eager to move into the new house before the baby is born.
46	10	"Welcome Home, Giovanna"	January 21, 2015	0.89
Snooki gives birth to her daughter. Jenni and Snooki decide to pamper the fathers.
47	11	"It's My Bachelorette Party... I'm Single and Ready to Mingle!"	January 28, 2015	0.80
Snooki and Jionni travel to Miami for their bachelor and bachelorette parties.
48	12	"I Do. Now What?"	February 4, 2015	1.03
Jenni and Roger have Meilani's christening. Snooki marries Jionni. Note: the series finale aired as a 90 minutes episode.
