= The Group Chat =

2025 TikTok series by Sydney Jo Robinson

- Created by: Sydney Jo Robinson
- Inspired by: Jersey Shore: Family Vacation by SallyAnn Salsano
- Written by: Sydney Jo Robinson
- Starring: Sydney Jo Robinson; Charlie Puth
- Country of origin: United States
- Original language: English
- No. of seasons: 7
- No. of episodes: 66

Production
- Production location: Costa Rica (Season Three)

Original release
- Network: TikTok
- Release: March 30, 2025 – present

The Group Chat is a series of TikTok videos produced and starring Sydney Jo Robinson. The series follows a group of women in a group chat as one member, Hailey, attempts to invite her boyfriend to a dinner in which it was already agreed that nobody's boyfriend would be invited. The videos were posted on TikTok and have resulted in multiple brand deals as they quickly grew in popularity.

== Plot ==
=== Season One ===
Hailey sends a text into her friends' group chat, asking if she can invite her boyfriend, Justin, to dinner that night, claiming to not want to leave him after a difficult day. Allison and Sloane (Note: Allison and Sloane were unnamed characters until the release of the prequel episode. Until then, they were referred to simply as, respectively, "White Dress" and "Black Dress" by both fans and Robinson.) discuss the text, and Jess claims she cannot change the reservation, but Hailey reveals that she already had. The rest of the group are uncomfortable, so Hailey says that she is not comfortable leaving Justin alone and decides not to go to dinner, leaving the group chat. Jess tries to remove Hailey from the reservation at Group Chat Café and learns that Hailey had actually changed their reservation two weeks prior.

That night, as everyone gets dressed for dinner, Hailey asks Maddy to be added back to the group chat and apologizes, claiming her relationship is fraught and asking to go to dinner. Jess says that they cannot change the reservation again at Group Chat Café, so Hailey reveals a reservation at Group Chat Steakhouse that she found. Julia gets to the steakhouse and finds Justin there. Sloane confronts Justin, who says that Hailey knew about his dinner plans that night. Justin wants to return to his friends as Hailey appears and claims going there was not her idea. A woman then appears and calls Justin "babe".

One week later, no one in the group chat has heard from Hailey. They discuss the situation in a group chat without Hailey, when Julia realizes that Justin does not have Hailey on his social media. Allison looks up the girl from the restaurant while Jess calls a coworker of hers who knows Justin and reveals Justin was in fact dating the girl from Group Chat Steakhouse, Lucy, and cheating on her with Hailey. Jess calls Allison and Sloane to tell them, and they tell the rest of the group chat. However, as they react, Allison accidentally sends a text about the situation into the group chat with Hailey.

=== The Group Chat: Tea Time ===
In a special released between seasons, Sydney Jo hosts a conversation with the various girls from the group chat. Each girl explains their feelings about the situation, leading to Hailey crying and leaving. With Hailey gone, the group speculate about her already knowing about Lucy. Julia addresses the wrong text and refers to a divide in the group that has developed since.

=== Season Two ===
Sloane and Allison are added to a group chat for Julia's bachelorette party, which she decided to throw in Costa Rica despite the wedding being in Greece. Hailey comments her concern about the cost, but Emily responds that it is worth going to celebrate Julia. Hailey agrees, satisfied with Julia's claim of a discounted flight. Maddy responds positively, forcing Sloane, Allison, and Jess to accept the bachelorette. Julia sends out room assignments, with Sloane and Allison sharing a room with Hailey, but they get Hailey to switch rooms with Maddy.

Emily suddenly drops out of the bachelorette party and asks for her money back, leading to the rest having to pay more. Julia asks the rest of the group to pay the difference caused by Emily, so Allison, Jess, and Sloane voice their discomfort in the group chat. Surprising the group, Maddy responds against Emily, her roommate. Emily agrees to pay her share, and Julia reveals that Maddy moved out of her and Emily's apartment and is living with Hailey. Maddy gets upset when Hailey tries to reveal Emily's secret, only wanting Julia to find out. Sloane summarizes the situation to Allison and Jess, deducing that Emily is having an affair with Julia's fiancé, Johnny. Julia calls Allison, revealing that the truth was that Emily is dating Julia's brother. Sloane calls Emily and directly asks what is happening, so Emily explains that she kicked Maddy out of their apartment. Emily starts to explain what Maddy did to upset Emily, saying it was connected to the night Hailey confronted Justin at Group Chat Steakhouse.

=== Group Chat Prequel ===
In a prequel episode set in 2015, Sloane's mother convinces her to go to a party where Allison will be. Allison is upset to see Sloane, and Sloane is upset to see that Hailey and Allison are friends. Hailey accidentally spills her drink on Sloane's bathing suit, which Sloane insists was on purpose. Jess pulls her out to dry off. Allison checks on Sloane, who does not want to talk to her. The two argue about Allison's friendship with Hailey and Allison not telling Sloane that Sloane's boyfriend was cheating on her. Allison leaves, crying, and Hailey confronts Sloane for hurting Allison. Feeling bad, Sloane apologizes, and they suggest that they would like the other's new friends. Wanting to start over, the group reintroduce themselves to each other. Jess takes a selfie with everyone, and they all ask for her to send it to them, leading Sloane to suggest they make a group chat.

=== Season Three ===
On the first day of Julia's bachelorette party, Hailey puts on a white outfit, which upsets Julia, so Sloane spills a drink on Hailey. At dinner that night, the group discuss who will pay, and Maddy insists on paying less, but Jess explains that it would be best not to split checks until after the return. The next day, Allison, Sloane, and Jess work to avoid Hailey while going to the pool. Allison and Sloane express their frustrations with Hailey flirting with a man at the bar that was already expressing interest in Sloane. Hailey then enters and acts as though he was flirting with both, and Jess finds an excuse to leave with her. While the group get ready for brunch, Jess complains to Sloane and Allison about Maddy. Julia then leaves and complains about her sister planning events that she is not happy with. Sloane assures Julia that they will find a new activity, when Maddy comes in and asks about Hailey. Allison reveals that Emily never told them what Maddy did, so Maddy explains that she had casually dated Justin prior to Hailey meeting him.

The next night, Hailey passive-aggressively comments about Maddy and Justin, leading Maddy to reveal the truth to everyone. Fights start, but Sloane interrupts and scolds everyone for being focused on the drama. The group toast to Julia. The next day, using a bathroom in the other hotel room, Sloane and Allison find the box for a pregnancy test laying out, leading Allison to believe one of their friends to be pregnant.

== Development ==
=== Writing ===
Prior to The Group Chat, Sydney Jo Robinson's most successful video had reached nine million views on TikTok. Inspiration for the series came while watching an episode of Jersey Shore: Family Vacation in which Mike Sorrentino informs the rest of the cast that he was released from jail via a group chat message while on a flight to Las Vegas.

In writing, Robinson was inspired by common themes between conversations with her sister and her friends, noting that larger group chats are often used for petty reasons. The character Hailey was inspired by Haley James from the series One Tree Hill. The first season took Robinson approximately one year to write.

The second season was written after the beginning of the first season, focusing on other storylines.

=== Filming ===
Robinson portrays every character in the series, with the exception of Justin. Justin was voiced by Charlie Puth, who had commented on two previous videos about enjoying the series. Puth then reached out to Robinson, offering to play Justin. Although Robinson intended for Justin to only appear in the one episode, she noted in an interview that, "Obviously if he ever wanted to be involved … of course he’s got the part, no question." Each episode was filmed around Robinson's schedule working for an estate jewelry company. She noted that, "Setting up the camera and getting into the different outfits is what takes the most time." However, as time passed, Robinson was able to shift to part-time position at her job, making TikTok her full time job.

The third season of the series is set in Costa Rica during a bachelorette party for a girl named Julia. Robinson initially intended to film the videos on Long Island or in New Jersey, but then TripAdvisor sponsored her to go to Costa Rica and film on location at a Hilton Worldwide hotel, which Hilton Worldwide sponsored for her.

=== Brand Deals ===
As the videos quickly grew in popularity, the TikTok accounts of various brands began commenting on the videos such as The UPS Store. She also received multiple companies asking for brand deals. Aware that sponsored videos on TikTok are often perceived as selling out, Robinson ensured that the sponsored videos would still be integrated into the story of The Group Chat. This went against the tendency on TikTok of making advertisements as subtle as possible. Her first sponsor, Domino's Pizza, was hesitant to accept this and asked her to follow the typical method, but Robinson refused to do the partnership unless it was within a labeled "Commercial Break". Comments under the videos continued praising the series, expressing pride in Robinson for being able to get paid by major companies. The advertisement got more views and engagement than more professionally made advertisements. There was another advertisement in the form of a "deleted scene" to promote the television series You.

The third season was done in partnership with both Hilton Worldwide and TripAdvisor. The two companies sponsored her going to Costa Rica to film the season, allowing her to incorporate them into the plot. Hilton was integrated throughout the entire season, which Hilton Worldwide Senior Vice President of Global Content, Media, and Partnerships Dan Reynolds noted led to a successful partnership, saying, "Early signals are really positive that [the partnership] is doing exactly what we wanted to do—break through with a group of people who are really hard to get to." She also got a brand deal with Pantene.

== Release ==
Sydney Jo Robinson released the first episode of the series on March 30, 2025. By the time episode three had aired, several celebrities and brands had commented on the video asking for more parts. This led Robinson to delay episode four and instead post a trailer for the episode before releasing it on April 5, 2025, revealing Charlie Puth's casting. She then released the final episode of the first season on April 8, 2025.

Speaking about the release schedule, Robinson said, "I try to put it out as quickly as possible because I personally, it's just, I'm a huge fan of tv [...] and I hate waiting, I really do. So I try to put them out really fast."

== Reception ==
The series became popular very quickly, gaining 29 million views within its first week. Cumulatively, the entire series, including the trailer for episode four, had gotten 77 million views by April 7. By April 11, the first video had reached over thirty millions views and four million likes. By July 10, it had reached 35 million views. By June 15, it had nearly 35 million views. This led to a sudden increase in Robinson's following, and she reached 1.6 million followers by June 2025 after starting with 260,000 followers. The video was also commented on by various celebrities, including Leslie Jones, Hailey Bieber, and Charlie Puth.

As The Daily Dot reported, the series resonated with viewers who expressed strong opinions about the boyfriend not being invited. J-14 said that the series "immediately hit way too close to home." Familiar with the situation of the first season, fans created videos from the perspective of bystanders. Wired discussed the series alongside the 2025 United States government group chat leaks to discuss the conventions and security of group chats.

The character's styles of communication was analyzed by Stassi Schroeder, comparing her own communication style to Emily and that of her co-star, Katie Maloney, to Maddie. Bethenny Frankel posted about the content of the video as well. Mamamia commented on the situation and communication style as well, praising Jess as a character by noting, "Every group chat has/needs a Jessica, the type of no-nonsense person who voices the concerns of the wider group."

As the series grew in popularity, a theory spread that Hailey Bieber had paid Robinson to create the series so that searches for her name alongside that of Justin Bieber would yield results of The Group Chat rather than the drama that the pair were experiencing at the time. Robinson responded to the theory laughing and assuring that it was not true. The response video was then reposted by Hailey Bieber.

Ad Age praised Robinson's style of advertising with television-inspired "Commercial Breaks" rather than subtle advertisements that simply have a hashtag in the description.

The series was ranked by Ad Age as the number one trend of 2025.
