= Meet the In-Laws =

Meet the In-Laws may refer to:

== Films ==
- Meet the In-Laws (2011 film), South Korean film
- Meet the In-Laws (2012 film), Chinese film
- Meet the In-Laws (2017 film), Nigerian film

== TV episodes ==
- "Meet the In-Laws", a 1967 episode from the American TV series Petticoat Junction
- "Meet the In-Laws", a 2012 episode from the American TV series Snooki & Jwoww
