= Jersey Shore Massacre =

- Directed by: Paul Tarnopol
- Written by: Paul Tarnopol
- Produced by: Teri Tarnopol; Jenni "JWoww" Farley
- Starring: Danielle Dallacco; Ron Jeremy; Angelica Boccella; Giovanni Roselli; Leonarda Jonie; Chris Lazzaro; Sal Governale; Richard Christy; Shawn C. Phillips
- Edited by: Brian Bayerl
- Release date: 2014
- Country: United States
- Language: English

Jersey Shore Massacre is a 2014 comedy horror film written and directed by Paul Tarnopol.

The film's executive producer is Jenni "JWoww" Farley, a cast member of the MTV Jersey Shore television series.

== Plot ==
A group of obnoxious, big-haired, thick accented, guidoette Brooklyn hairstylists set out for an all-girls weekend by the Jersey Shore and murder and mayhem ensue at the hands of a masked killer.

== Critical reception ==
The Hollywood Reporter, "You know a film’s in trouble when porn star Ron Jeremy is the classiest thing in it."

Horror Press, "An underappreciated gem."

Variety, "A contender for the “Could Be Woise” prize among this year’s dogs of late summer, “Jersey Shore Massacre” is a kinda-sorta comedy slasher faintly affiliated (via exec producer JWoww) to MTV’s popular reality skein."

Los Angeles Times, "If your enjoyment of reality TV’s most celebrated beach house party animals hinged on all the drunken humiliation, girl fights and “come at me, bro” set-tos, writer-director Paul Tarnopol’s energetically dumb exercise in blood-drenched slaughter at the hands of a masked killer might test your pop culture taste for others’ ill will."

== See also ==
- Jersey Shore (TV series)
