= JWoww =

American television personality (born 1985)

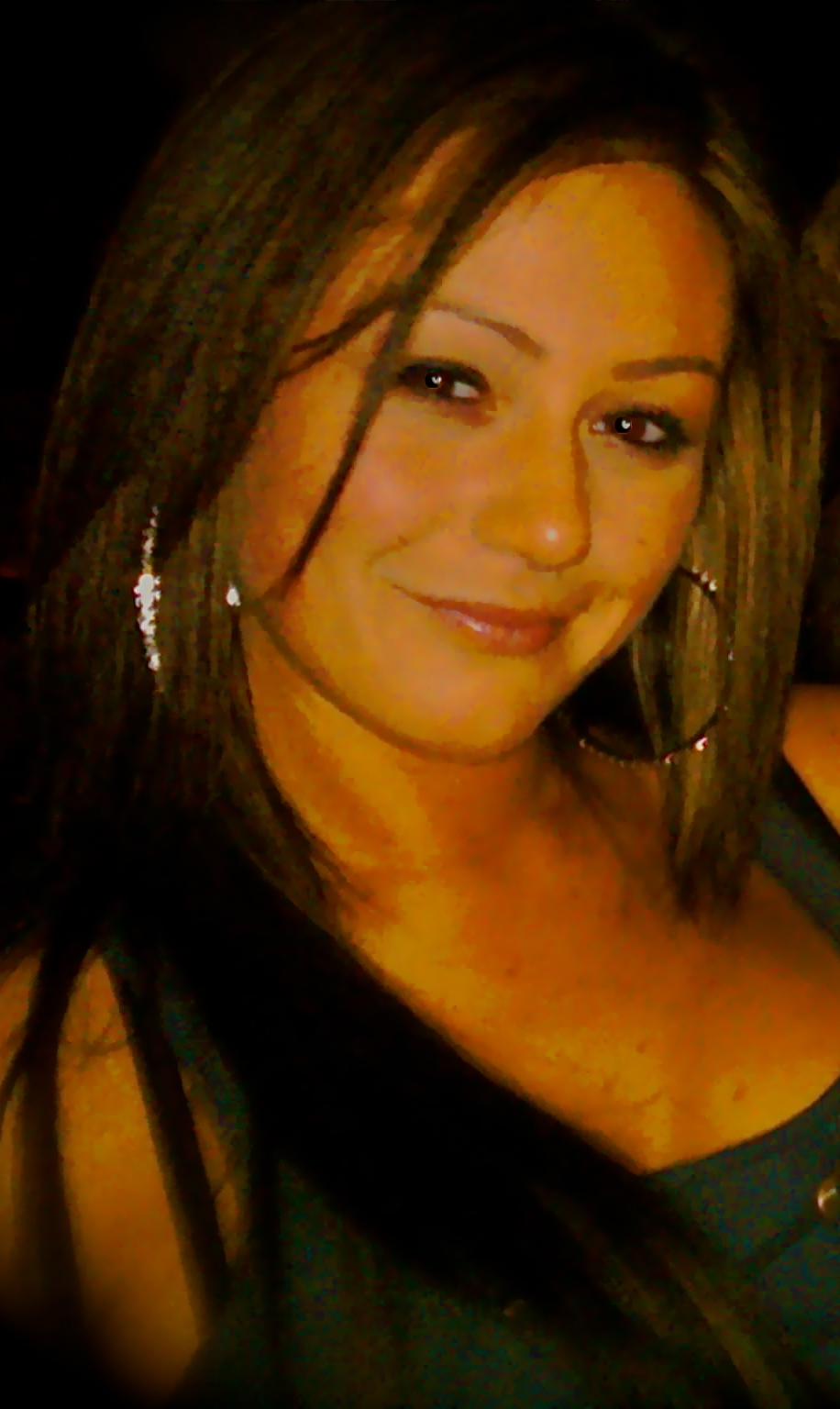
- JWoww in 2010
- Born: Jennifer Lynn Farley; February 27, 1985 (age 41); East Greenbush, New York, U.S.
- Occupation: Television personality
- Years active: 2009–present
- Known for: Jersey Shore
- Spouse: Roger Mathews (m. 2015; div. 2019) Zack Carpinello (m. 2026)
- Children: 2
- Website: jennifarley.com

Jennifer Lynn Farley (born February 27, 1985), also known as JWoww, is an American television personality. She first came to prominence as one of the eight main cast members in the MTV reality series Jersey Shore, and is a main cast member of its spin-offs, Snooki & Jwoww, Snooki & Jwoww: Moms with Attitude, and Jersey Shore: Family Vacation. She has also made several appearances on other shows, such as TNA Impact!, Disaster Date and Marriage Boot Camp: Reality Stars.

== Early life ==
Farley was born in East Greenbush, New York, where she attended Columbia High School. She later attended the New York Institute of Technology. Before starting her career, she spent time working as a nanny. For a year, during which time she auditioned for Jersey Shore, Farley lived in Franklin Square, New York, on Long Island.

In 2019, she took a DNA test to learn of her full genetic background. Her 23andMe test stated she is mostly of Northwestern European ancestry, the breakdown being 24% British/Irish, 16.9% French/German and 23.9% Broadly Northwestern European, with her recent ancestor location being Ireland. The test would also prove she had a small percentage of Italian ancestry, a fact that surprised her as she had previously stated that she was not Italian like most of her Jersey Shore costars. She herself has claimed to be of Irish and Spanish descent, although her DNA test would also reveal she only has a small amount of Iberian ancestry.

== Career ==
Before Jersey Shore, Farley owned a graphic design business, Jenni Farley Designs, Inc. In December 2009, at age 23, Farley began appearing in Jersey Shore in which she and seven housemates spent the summer in Seaside Heights, New Jersey. The second season was filmed in Miami, Florida, and then the third season returned to New Jersey. A fourth season of the series was filmed in Florence, Italy, and the final two seasons moved back to Seaside Heights.

Farley launched a line, "Filthy Couture", in a Las Vegas runway show in July 2010. After four months of operation, the line ceased sales in October 2010 due to a threatened trademark lawsuit. Farley stated that the brand was not over and a new line would be released. In April 2011, MTV announced that it ordered two Jersey Shore spin-off series, one of which will feature Farley and castmate Nicole Polizzi. Twelve episodes were ordered for the first season. In 2010, she released a book titled The Rules According to JWOWW: Shore-Tested Secrets On Landing a Mint Guy, Staying Fresh to Death, and Kicking the Competition to the Curb. In 2012, she was sued for allegedly filming several episodes of her reality show without proper authorization from her landlord.

In 2012, Farley and her Jersey Shore co-star Nicole Polizzi began starring in Snooki & JWoww, which premiered on MTV on June 21, 2012. The first season was filmed over the course of six weeks at a former two-story firehouse located near Grove and Mercer Streets in Jersey City, New Jersey, followed Polizzi and Farley moving in together, and was described as a modern-day Laverne & Shirley. Farley also hosted MTV's Club New Year's Eve 2013 with Polizzi and Jeff Dye to ring in 2013. The duo did star again in the second season of Snooki & JWoww, which followed the stars at their actual permanent residences, and premiered on January 8, 2013. It was renewed for a third season.

In October 2011, Farley launched her official website.

In January 2013, Farley ranked in GQ magazine's "Sexiest 100 Ladies of the 21st Century" list.

In 2015, Farley competed and won the seventh season of Worst Cooks in America: Celebrity Edition. Farley also made her feature film debut starring in the indie production, The Mint, in which she played the girlfriend of a record executive and also served as the film's executive producer. Since late 2015, she has starred in Snooki & Jwoww: Moms with Attitude.

In 2018, Farley returned to the Jersey Shore franchise starring in Jersey Shore: Family Vacation.

In 2024, Farley made her directorial debut with the found footage horror film Devon. On February 25, 2025, Farley was announced to write and direct Nanny Cam. The film draws on her own personal experiences growing up with an absent mother and of first-time motherhood.

== Personal life ==
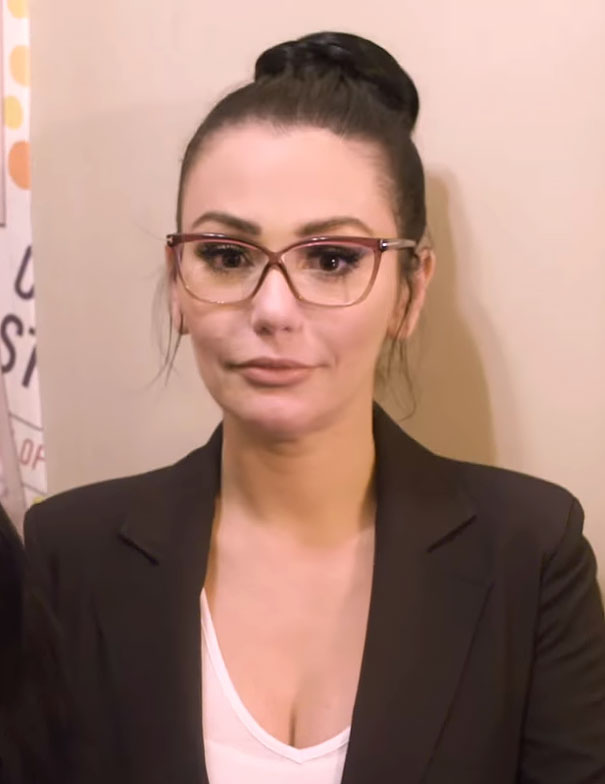
Farley in 2018

Farley and Roger Mathews married in October 2015. They have two children: daughter Meilani, born July 13, 2014, and son Greyson, born May 5, 2016. In September 2018, Farley filed for divorce, citing irreconcilable differences. In the midst of her divorce from Mathews, on December 17, 2018, she reported to the police that her previous boyfriend Tom Lippolis, whom she had dated approximately 10 years prior, and had made appearances with her in the early seasons of Jersey Shore, attempted to extort $25,000 from her in exchange for not selling "her secrets" to the press. He was arrested for this crime on December 19, 2018. In August 2019, Farley's divorce from Mathews was finalized.

From April to October 2019, Farley was in a relationship with former All Elite Wrestling professional wrestler Zack Carpinello. After a brief separation period, Farley confirmed reconciliation on her Instagram page in December 2019. In February 2021, the couple became engaged at the Empire State Building, a surprise for Farley’s birthday. On June 24, 2026, the couple married in a surprise ceremony in Old Bridge.

== Filmography ==
=== Film ===
Year	Title	Role	Notes
2012	The Three Stooges	JWoww	Cameo role
2014	Jersey Shore Massacre	—N/a	Executive producer
2015	The Mint	Vicky	Actress and executive producer
2024	Devon	—N/a	Writer and director
2025	Nanny Cam	—N/a	Writer and director

=== Television ===
Year	Title	Role	Notes
2009–2012	Jersey Shore	Herself	Credited as JWoww (71 episodes)
2010	TNA iMPACT!	Herself	2 episodes
2011	Silent Library	Herself	Episode "Jersey Shore"
2012–2015	Snooki & Jwoww	Herself	Credited as JWoww (48 episodes)
2012	MTV's Club New Year's Eve 2013	Herself	Hosted with Snooki and Jeff Dye
2013	One Life to Live	Nikki	Recurring character
2014	Marriage Boot Camp	Herself	Main cast (Season 3: Reality Stars, 8 episodes)
2015	Worst Cooks in America	Contestant	Winner (Season 7: Celebrity Edition 1, 6 episodes)
2015–2017	Snooki & Jwoww: Moms with Attitude	Herself	
2016	Burgers, Brew & 'Que	Herself	
2017	Jenni & Roger: Domesticated	Herself	
2018–2026	Jersey Shore: Family Vacation	Herself	Main cast
2020	Celebrity Family Feud	Herself	Season 7, Episode 4
2021	Floribama Shore	Herself	Season 4, Episode 14 & 15, Hosted with Snooki
2022	Buckhead Shore	Herself	Season 1, Episode 11 & 12, Hosted with The Situation
2024	The Tiny Chef Show	Herself	Episode: "Ruby Stew"
