= Raw Leiba =

American actor

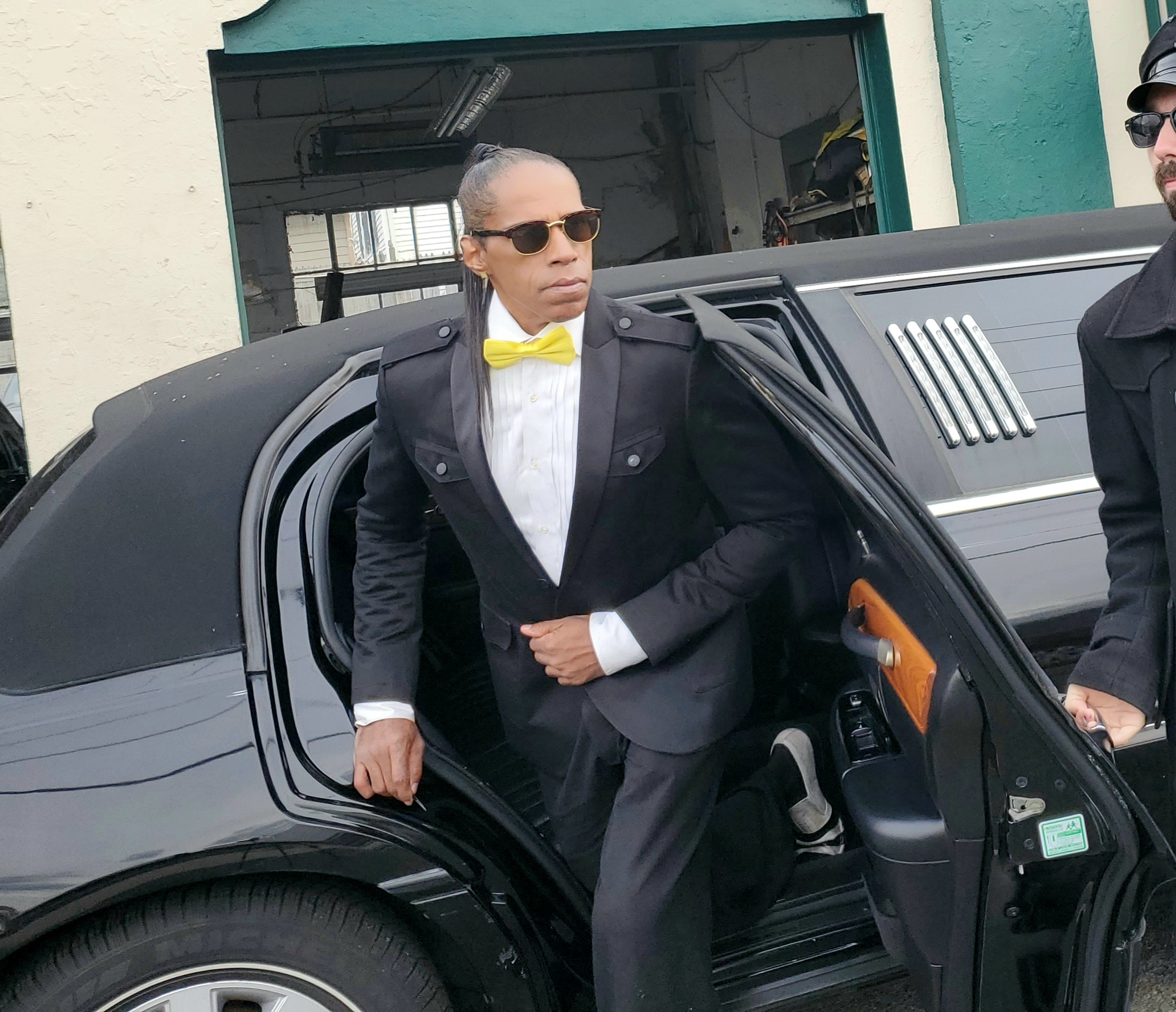
- Born: Newark, New Jersey, U.S.
- Occupations: Actor; producer; stunt coordinator; athlete; model
- Years active: 1995–present

Raw Leiba is an American actor, producer, stunt coordinator, former athlete and model.

== Career ==
Leiba played Stringer Bell's bodyguard in three episodes of The Wire: "Reformation", "Middle Ground" and "Mission Accomplished". He was named Gym Magazine's "Fittest Human" for 2007. In 2015, he appeared in a film called The Mint. Leiba appeared in the 2015 film Bone Tomahawk, where he acted in a role as a major antagonist called "Wolf Skull", a savage and mute member of an extremely violent cannibalistic mute clan, called the "Troglodytes".

== Filmography ==
=== Film ===
Year	Title	Role	Notes
1995	Rap City	Guest Host	
1999	Any Given Sunday	Wide Receiver	
2007	Cover	Man Whistling to Woman	Uncredited
2010	Fable: Teeth of Beasts	Darius	Direct-to-video
2010	Blood and Love	Havoc	
2011	Conan the Barbarian	Rexor	
2011	The Ascension	Lando / Soul Leech	Also stuntman
2012	Changing the Game	Balu	Also stuntman
2012	Cybornetics	Ice Morales	
2013	Ember Days	Azazel	
2013	Dead Man Down	Harry's Jamaican #2	
2013	The Heat	Paint Factory Henchman	
2013	Cybornetics: Urban Cyborg	Ice Morales	
2013	Awakened	Cranium	
2013	Day of the Gun	Charlie Broken Hand	
2014	The Last American Guido	Jocko	
2015	Bone Tomahawk	Wolf Skull	
2017	Batman: Master of Fear	Nightmare	
2017	The Mint	Reynaldo Stevens	
2019	The Marshal	Woody	
2020	Human Zoo	Contestant 1812	
2020	Bruised	Referee #2	
2024	Bloodspawn	Yonagadoga	
2024	The Vanishing Act	Nayak	

=== Television ===
Year	Title	Role	Notes
2003	The System	Teacher	9 episodes
2004	The Wire	Stringer's Bodyguard	3 episodes
2005	Forensic Files	Native American Accomplice	Episode: "Four on the Floor"
2007	Life Support	Sportbike Gang Leader	Television film
2007	The Knights of Prosperity	Bouncer #3	Episode: "Operation: Save Esperanza"
2007	Kidnapped	Swat Commander	Episode: "Impasse"
2007	The Fantastic Two	Chad Johnson	Miniseries
2007–2008	Street Fighter: The Later Years	Balrog	6 episodes
2008	Burn Notice	Ricardo	Episode: "Turn and Burn"
2010	Mayne Street	Shawn Curtis	2 episodes
2013	Black Women Don't Deserve to Be Loved	Guy	Episode: "Donna"
2014	Falling Skies	Cain	Episode: "Exodus"
2015	Tut	King Artatama II	2 episodes
2017	Sangre de mi tierra	Dario Guapos	Episode #1.12
2018	Day of the Gun: The Series	Charlie Broken Hand	Episode: "Revenge"
TBA	Our Flag Means Death	Mabo Warrior	Episode: "A Damned Man"
2022	The Walking Dead	Attila	Episode: "A New Deal"

=== Video games ===
Year	Title	Role	Notes
2009	The Chronicles of Riddick: Assault on Dark Athena	Guard	
