= The Mint (film) =

- Directed by: Raymond Mamrak
- Written by: Chris Cardillo; Raymond Mamrak
- Produced by: Chris Cardillo; Chris Cardillo, Sr.
- Starring: Jenni "JWoww" Farley; Kristinia DeBarge; Chris Cardillo; Ashlee Keating
- Production company: Automatic Art Pictures
- Distributed by: Garden State Media
- Release date: September 3, 2015
- Country: United States
- Language: English

The Mint is a 2015 comedy film directed by Raymond Mamrak and starring JWoww, Kristinia DeBarge, Chris Cardillo and Ashlee Keating. The film is based on a story by Cardillo and adapted into a screenplay by Mamrak. Cardillo stars opposite MTV's Jersey Shore's reality star Jenni "JWoww" Farley, who also serves as the film's executive producer, a record executive trying to get his company back on track after the death of his parents.

Cardillo began developing the film in January 2014 and while J. Fontaine and the Jersey Mint Records actually exist, the film isn't based on actual events despite Cardillo's involvement. Mamrak was hired and replaced Samuel C. Morrison, Jr. as the screenwriter, in addition to serving as director, producer, and actor.

The Mint was filmed in New Jersey.

== Plot ==
The Mint follows J. Fontain, a record producer, in his downward spiral after his parents die and is left to run the family's once successful record label. Things become increasingly stressful and unbearable which causes Fontaine to push everyone away, especially his close friends and girlfriend, Vicki. After relocating the recording company to New York City to be closer to where the action is. The little bit of money the label brings in is going fast and to make matters worse, Fontaine is losing all of his artists and friends in the process.

Eventually the only people left at the label are Peezy, a happy-go-lucky one hit wonder and Melody, one of the label's artists who hasn't had a hit in a while, and his girlfriend Vicki, who has been helping as best as she can to keep the business going amidst J's breakdown in his desperate attempt to find the next big thing.

As the walls continue to cave in a country girl, Samantha Cole is the voice that Fontaine hears that lights a renewed fire inside of him that he knows will save the business. With a little help from his friends Fontaine tries to find the girl with the voice, save the label, and hopefully save himself in the process.

== Cast ==
- Jenni "JWoww" Farley as Vicky
- Ray Mamrak as Barry
- Chris Cardillo as J. Fontaine
- Kristinia DeBarge as Melody
- Brian Anthony Wilson as Ted Firestone
- Raw Leiba as Reynaldo Stevens
- Ashlee Keating as Samantha Cole

== Soundtrack ==
A soundtrack for the film features music Rakim, Honey Cocaine, Kristinia DeBarge, Madeline Smith, J. Fontaine and more and was released by the Jersey Mint Records.
