= Leonarda Jonie =

American comedian

- Born: Leonarda Gjoni; Montenegro
- Citizenship: United States

Comedy career
- Medium: Comedy, television, film, social media, podcasting
- Genres: Satire, political satire, observational comedy
- Subjects: American politics, human sexuality, leisure, current events

YouTube information
- Channel: Leonarda Jonie
- Years active: 2014–present
- Genres: Comedy, current events, politics
- Subscribers: 368 thousand
- Views: 114.8 million
- Last updated: November 8, 2026
- Website: leonardaisfunny.com

Leonarda Jonie (born Leonarda Gjoni) is a Montenegrin-American comedian and political commentator based in Austin, Texas.

Jonie was born in Montenegro to a Albanian father and a Montenegrin mother and raised in New York City.

Jonie was featured (as "Leonarda Bosch") in the 2014 film Jersey Shore Massacre.
