= Snooki & Jwoww =

American reality television series

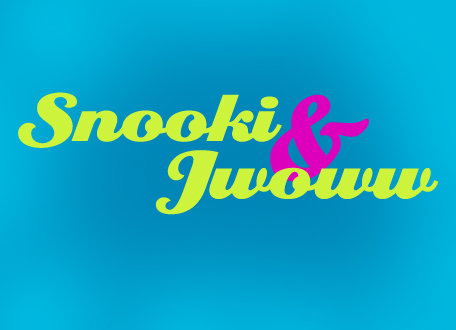
- Genre: Reality
- Developed by: SallyAnn Salsano
- Starring: Snooki; JWoww
- Opening theme: "I Love It" by Icona Pop featuring Charli XCX
- Country of origin: United States
- Original language: English
- No. of seasons: 4
- No. of episodes: 48 (list of episodes)

Production
- Executive producers: SallyAnn Salsano; Joel Zimmer; Pamela LaLima; Jacquelyn French; Janay Dutton
- Production locations: Jersey City, New Jersey; Manchester, New Jersey; Pelican Island, New Jersey; Toms River, New Jersey
- Running time: 30 minutes (seasons 1, 3); 60 minutes (seasons 2, 4)
- Production companies: 495 Productions; MTV Production Development

Original release
- Network: MTV
- Release: June 21, 2012 – February 4, 2015

Related
- Jersey Shore; The Pauly D Project; The Show with Vinny; Jersey Shore: Family Vacation

Snooki & Jwoww is an American reality television series on MTV starring Nicole "Snooki" Polizzi and Jennifer "JWoww" Farley. It is the second of three spin-offs of Jersey Shore, on which both Polizzi and Farley previously gained fame as cast members. The series ran from June 21, 2012 until February 4, 2015 spanning four seasons.

== Cast ==
=== Main ===
- Nicole "Snooki" Polizzi
- Jennifer "Jwoww" Farley

=== Recurring ===
- Jionni LaValle — Nicole's husband. He and Snooki became engaged before the first season aired. He and Snooki married on November 29, 2014.
- Roger Mathews — Jenni's now ex-husband. He and JWoww became engaged in the ninth episode of the second season ("Taking the Plunge"). He and JWoww married on October 18, 2015.

== Episodes ==
Season	Episodes	Originally released	
Season	Episodes	First released	Last released
1	12	June 21, 2012	September 13, 2012
2	12	January 8, 2013	April 2, 2013
3	12	October 22, 2013	January 14, 2014
4	12	November 5, 2014	February 4, 2015

== Production ==
The series was first announced by MTV on April 7, 2011, as one of two spinoffs of Jersey Shore, on which both Polizzi and Farley previously gained fame as cast members, with the other spinoff focusing on their castmate, Paul "Pauly D" DelVecchio. The first season, which consists of 12 episodes, focuses on Polizzi and Farley living together after the conclusion the fifth season of Jersey Shore, and is described by the two stars as a modern-day Laverne & Shirley. SallyAnn Salsano of 495 Productions, who also produced Jersey Shore, is the executive producer of the series. MTV's tentative title for the series was reported by NJ.com on February 26, 2012 as Snooki and JWoww vs. the World.

The production initially sought to film in Hoboken, New Jersey, but were denied a permit. An invitation to the crew to film in Jersey Shore, Pennsylvania was later rescinded by Central Pennsylvania Film Office following a public outcry. Eventually a former firehouse at 38 Mercer Street at Grove Street in Jersey City, New Jersey was chosen as the filming location. The property was guarded at all times by at least four Jersey City police officers, who also followed the cast and crew when leaving the home, conditions to which producers were required to agree in order to be granted a shooting permit. The conditions also indicated that the police would take action, including on the cast, if any state or city laws were broken, and that producers would reimburse the city for any increase in police presence or similar costs that might have occurred due to events related to the production.

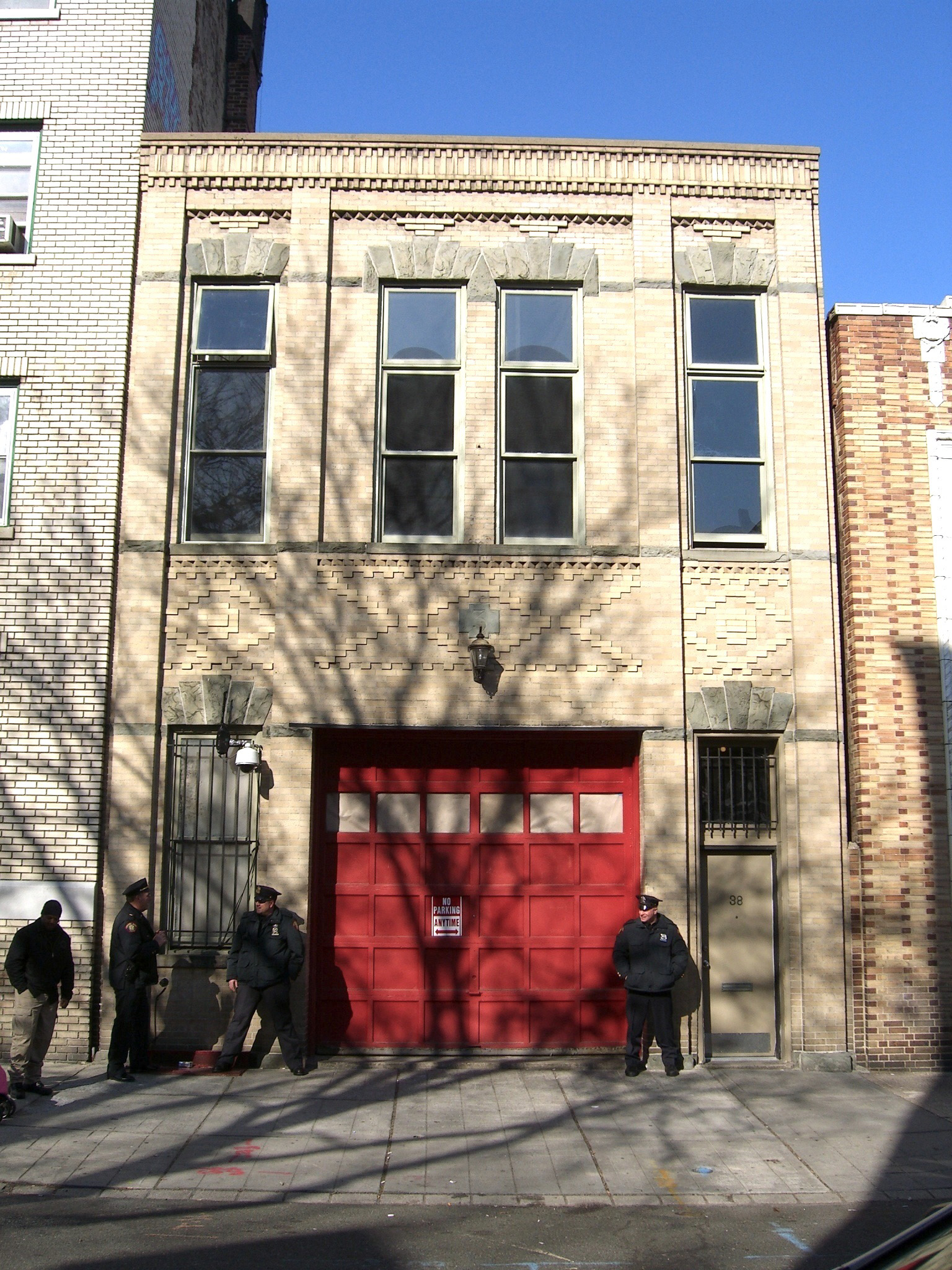
The former firehouse at 38 Mercer Street in Jersey City, New Jersey that served as the first season residence. Seen in the photo are a member of the production staff and Jersey City Police officers.

Prior to filming, several businesses in the area, including the bars Skinner's Loft, Barcade and LITM, denied filming permits to MTV, which The Jersey Journal reported was due to their need to make their regular customers a priority. In addition, a "No Snooki" sign was posted in the window of a liquor store around the corner from the firehouse, whose general manager stated that either of the two women would be turned away if they attempted to patronize that establishment. The Beechwood Cafe and Market, across the street from the firehouse, also indicated they would not let the two in their restaurant. Tia's Place, a trendy clothing store on Grove Street, also declined filming because that store's contract prohibits it. The week Polizzi and Farley moved into their home, Newark, New Jersey Mayor Cory Booker denied filming permits to the production company, stating in a letter printed by the Newark Star-Ledger, "While we appreciate your desire to film and capture the essence of our great city, we are confident that the filming of this show will most certainly attract a high level of local and national attention and notoriety." Booker explained his decision by saying that he did not wish the city's emergency personnel to devote its time to handling incidents involving the reality stars. Other businesses, however, were more welcoming to the production, including O'Connell's Bar & Grill on Montgomery Street, Walker's Apothecary, a spa and nail salon near the apartment, and Bar Majestic on Grove Street.

Filming on the series began with the arrival of the two cast members at the residence on February 25, 2012, a week later than the anticipated filming date posted by the production company, with the first full day of filming being the next day, when they moved their belongings into the home. Filming was initially expected to last six weeks, five of which would be designated for principal photography of the stars, though it eventually ended March 26, as the production had filmed enough material for the allotted episodes earlier than expected.

In contrast to the mixed reception from local businesses, many area residents welcomed the production, with crowds of fans and local residents gathering daily behind a police barricade across the street to catch glimpses of the series' two stars.

In an issue of Us Weekly published the first week of March 2012, Polizzi confirmed that she was pregnant, and had discovered this about a week after the New Year. Rumors of her pregnancy prior to the publication of that issue gave MTV cause for concern, as it would preclude her from engaging in the "hard-partying, booze-swilling" antics that, on Jersey Shore, had garnered high ratings that revitalized the network, and would require a change in the creative direction of the show.

In April 2012, the series' name had been finalized to simply Snooki & Jwoww. It premiered June 21, 2012.

On July 10, 2012, satellite distributor DirecTV ceased broadcasting all Viacom channels, including MTV, which resulted in ratings for the channel in general to decrease significantly. The first episode to air following DirectTV's dropping of Viacom channels was Episode 4, "Guess Who's Coming To Dinner", which yielded a ratings score of 1.70, down from the previous episode's draw of 2.04.

MTV announced that the series was renewed for a second season on August 3, 2012. 495 Productions sought to film in Morristown, New Jersey, drawing mixed reaction from fans and politicians, with Council President Michelle Dupree-Harris saying that the event would be good for business, and Governor Chris Christie joking that the two stars, who are actually from New York, should return there. By July 30, a petition protesting the filming collected nearly 300 signatures. On that day, 495 Productions cancelled their request to film there, due to the conditions that local officials required of the production. Requests for filming were denied by Toms River and Point Pleasant Beach, before Manchester was ultimately chosen as the filming location, a decision that resulted in displeasure by some of the town's residents. Taping began in the third week of August for a then-eight months pregnant Polizzi and Farley, and was scheduled to conclude in October. The second season premiered on January 8, 2013, with which the series expanded to a one-hour format.

On April 25, 2013, MTV renewed the series for a third season, which premiered on October 22, 2013, returning to the original 30-minute episode format.

On April 24, 2014, MTV renewed the series for a fourth and final season, which premiered on November 5, 2014, and concluded on February 4, 2015.

== Release ==
The series has been released on iTunes, and on DVD. Season 1 was released only through Amazon.com on October 4, 2012. Season 2 was released May 6, 2013. Season 3 was released November 14, 2014.

== Ratings ==
Season	Timeslot (ET)	# Ep.	Premiered		Ended		TV season
Season	Timeslot (ET)	# Ep.	Date	Premiere viewers (in millions)	Date	Finale viewers (in millions)	TV season
1	Thursday; 10:00 pm	12	June 21, 2012	2.36	September 13, 2012	1.55	2012
2	Tuesday; 10:00 pm	12	January 8, 2013	2.08	April 2, 2013	1.70	2013
3	Tuesday; 10:00 pm	13	October 22, 2013	1.77	January 14, 2014	0.84	2013–2014
4	Wednesday 10:00 pm	12	November 5, 2014	0.85	February 4, 2015	1.03	2014–2015
