= List of Celebrity Family Feud episodes =

Celebrity Family Feud is an American television game show, based on Family Feud created by Mark Goodson. The series is produced by Fremantle, with Feudin' Productions for the first season and Triple Threat Productions for the subsequent seasons. It premiered on NBC on June 24, 2008, with Al Roker hosting, and was canceled in March 2009.

In April 2015, ABC announced a new incarnation of the show, which premiered on June 21, 2015, and hosted by Steve Harvey. The series is taped in front of a live audience in Los Angeles, outside several episodes in 2020 due to the COVID-19 pandemic. Thom Beers, Gaby Johnston, and Jennifer Mullin serve as executive producers.

As of July 9, 2026, 126 episodes of Celebrity Family Feud have aired, currently in its thirteenth season.

== Series overview ==
Season	Episodes	Originally released		
Season	Episodes	First released	Last released	Network
1	6	June 24, 2008	July 29, 2008	NBC
2	6	June 21, 2015	July 26, 2015	ABC
3	10	June 26, 2016	September 11, 2016	ABC
4	10	June 11, 2017	September 26, 2017	ABC
5	11	June 10, 2018	September 23, 2018	ABC
6	11	June 9, 2019	September 29, 2019	ABC
7	11	May 31, 2020	October 29, 2020	ABC
8	11	June 6, 2021	September 19, 2021	ABC
9	11	July 10, 2022	September 22, 2022	ABC
10	10	July 9, 2023	December 13, 2023	ABC
11	12	July 9, 2024	December 4, 2024	ABC
12	10	July 10, 2025	December 4, 2025	ABC
13	10	July 9, 2026	TBA	ABC

== Episodes ==
=== Season 1 (2008) ===
No. overall	No. in season	Title	Original release date	Prod. code	U.S. viewers (millions)	Rating/share (18–49)
1	1	"Ice-T vs. The Rivers and Raven-Symoné vs. Wayne Newton"	June 24, 2008	103	8.82	2.3/8
2	2	"Vincent Pastore vs. The Girls Next Door and Kathie Lee Gifford vs. Dog the Bounty Hunter"	July 1, 2008	106	6.89	1.9/7
3	3	"The Hickeys from My Name Is Earl vs. The Camden County All-Stars from My Name Is Earl and The Office vs. American Gladiators"	July 8, 2008	105	7.54	2.1/6
4	4	"Bill Engvall vs. Larry the Cable Guy and Vivica A. Fox vs. Mo'Nique"	July 15, 2008	102	7.82	2.0/7
5	5	"The Kardashians vs. Deion and Pilar Sanders and Tiki Barber vs. Ed McMahon"	July 22, 2008	104	7.28	1.8/6
6	6	"Corbin Bernsen vs. Margaret Cho and The American Chopper Family vs. Christopher Knight and Adrianne Curry"	July 29, 2008	101	7.53	2.0/6

=== Season 2 (2015) ===
No. overall	No. in season	Title	Original release date	Prod. code	U.S. viewers (millions)	Rating/share (18–49)
7	1	"Anthony Anderson vs. Toni Braxton and Monica Potter vs. Curtis Stone"	June 21, 2015	101	8.66	2.4/10
8	2	"NFL AFC vs. NFC and Dancing with the Stars vs. The Bachelor"	June 28, 2015	102	8.28	1.9/7
9	3	"Dr. Phil McGraw vs. Garry & Penny Marshall and Kevin McHale vs Fred Willard"	July 5, 2015	103	7.11	1.6/5
10	4	"Cheryl Hines vs. Niecy Nash and Duck Dynasty vs. Katy Mixon"	July 12, 2015	105	8.72	2.1/8
11	5	"Rob Gronkowski vs. Holly Robinson Peete and Bill Engvall vs. Keke Palmer"	July 19, 2015	104	8.81	2.0/7
12	6	"Joey Lawrence vs. Mario Lopez and Ed Asner vs. Vicki Lawrence"	July 26, 2015	106	8.71	2.0/7

=== Season 3 (2016) ===
No. overall	No. in season	Title	Original release date	Prod. code	U.S. viewers (millions)	Rating/share (18–49)
13	1	"Lance Bass vs. Kellie Pickler and Ernie Hudson vs. NeNe Leakes"	June 26, 2016	201	7.98	1.6/6
14	2	"AFC Defense vs. NFC Offense and AFC Offense vs. NFC Defense"	July 3, 2016	202	6.30	1.1/5
15	3	"Snoop Dogg vs. Sugar Ray Leonard and Laila Ali vs. George Hamilton"	July 10, 2016	203	7.43	1.5/6
16	4	"Professional Boxers Showdown and Joely Fisher vs. Tony Hawk"	July 17, 2016	208	7.77	1.5/6
17	5	"The Band Perry vs. Giuliana Rancic and Melissa Joan Hart vs. Paul Sorvino"	July 24, 2016	205	7.68	1.5/6
18	6	"Bachelors vs. Bachelorettes and IndyCar Drivers vs. Sports Illustrated Models"	July 31, 2016	206	7.30	1.5/6
19	7	"Paula Deen vs. Carson Kressley and Rico and Raini Rodriguez vs. Jaleel White"	August 14, 2016	204	5.05	1.0/4
20	8	"Tommy Davidson vs. Kristi Yamaguchi and Dave Foley vs. Jalen Rose"	August 21, 2016	207	5.63	1.2/5
21	9	"Gus Kenworthy vs. Sheryl Underwood and David Chokachi vs. Alan Thicke"	August 28, 2016	209	5.74	1.0/4
22	10	"Garrett Morris vs. Alfonso Ribeiro and Todd Chrisley vs. Sara Evans"	September 11, 2016	210	6.67	1.3/4

=== Season 4 (2017) ===
No. overall	No. in season	Title	Original release date	Prod. code	U.S. viewers (millions)	Rating/share (18–49)
23	1	"Kelly Clarkson vs Amy Schumer and Bindi and Robert Irwin vs Chrissy Metz"	June 11, 2017	301	7.03	1.5/6
24	2	"Eva Longoria vs George Lopez and Yvette Nicole Brown vs Ashley Graham"	June 18, 2017	302	6.25	1.4/6
25	3	"Harvey Family Men vs Harvey Family Women and Kareem Abdul-Jabbar vs Ralph Sampson"	June 25, 2017	303	7.25	1.4/6
26	4	"MLB Legends vs NBA Legends and NFL All-Stars vs NFL Legends"	July 9, 2017	305	6.84	1.3/6
27	5	"Neil deGrasse Tyson vs Rick Fox and Boy Band vs Girl Group"	July 16, 2017	304	6.22	1.1/5
28	6	"Funny Gals vs Funny Guys and Louie Anderson vs Christina Milian"	July 23, 2017	307	6.02	1.1/5
29	7	"Bachelors vs Bachelorettes and Sandra Lee vs Lea Thompson"	August 6, 2017	309	6.01	1.0/4
30	8	"Jennie Garth vs Kyle and Christopher Massey and Lee Brice vs Jerrod Niemann"	August 27, 2017	308	6.00	1.1/4
31	9	"Faith Evans vs Ross Mathews and USA Gymnastics vs USA Swimming"	September 24, 2017	306	5.23	1.1/4
32	10	"Dancing with the Stars vs Shark Tank and Cynthia Bailey vs Kandi Burruss-Tucker"	September 26, 2017	310	6.07	1.3/5

=== Season 5 (2018) ===
No. overall	No. in season	Title	Original release date	Prod. code	U.S. viewers (millions)	Rating/share (18–49)
33	1	"The Kardashians vs The West Family"	June 10, 2018	401	7.57	1.8/7
34	2	"Inside the NBA vs MLB All-Stars and Rashad Jennings vs Team Eve"	June 17, 2018	402	5.89	1.1/5
35	3	"Steph and Ayesha Curry vs Chris Paul and Laurie Hernandez vs Shawn Johnson East"	June 24, 2018	403	6.55	1.2/5
36	4	"Jeff Dunham vs Ming-Na Wen and Taye Diggs vs Caroline Rhea"	July 8, 2018	404	6.34	1.1/5
37	5	"Sherri Shepherd vs Ian Ziering and Tommy Chong vs Derek Fisher & Gloria Govan"	July 15, 2018	405	6.41	1.0/5
38	6	"Grey's Anatomy vs. Station 19 and Aly & AJ vs. Adrienne Houghton"	July 22, 2018	406	6.08	1.1/5
39	7	"Scotty McCreery vs Chris Kattan and Amber Riley vs Tori Spelling & Dean McDermott"	August 5, 2018	407	5.96	1.0/5
40	8	"Emmitt Smith vs Todd Gurley II and Craig Robinson vs Casey Wilson"	August 12, 2018	408	5.79	1.0/5
41	9	"Team Vanilla Ice vs Kim Fields and Team Ice-T & Coco vs Vivica A. Fox"	August 26, 2018	409	6.31	1.1/5
42	10	"NFLPA Veterans vs. NFLPA Rookies and Wanda Sykes vs. Nia Vardalos"	September 16, 2018	410	5.01	0.9/4
43	11	"The Kardashians vs. The West Family and Jana Kramer vs. Gary Busey"	September 23, 2018	411	4.12	0.6/3

=== Season 6 (2019) ===
No. overall	No. in season	Title	Original release date	Prod. code	U.S. viewers (millions)	Rating/share (18–49)
44	1	"Chrissy Teigen & John Legend vs Vanderpump Rules and Terry Crews vs Karamo Brown"	June 9, 2019	501	6.06	1.0/5
45	2	"The Chainsmokers vs 5 Seconds of Summer and Boris Kodjoe & Nicole Ari Parker vs Roselyn Sanchez & Eric Winter"	June 30, 2019	503	4.87	0.8/4
46	3	"Victoria's Secret Angels vs. Bachelor Men and Gaten Matarazzo vs. Maddie & Mackenzie Ziegler"	July 7, 2019	505	5.30	0.9/5
47	4	"Maria Menounos vs. Jeannie Mai and NFL Legends vs. NFL All-Stars"	July 14, 2019	504	5.04	0.8/4
48	5	"Brooklyn Decker & Andy Roddick vs. Bobby Bones and Tara Lipinski vs. Johnny Weir"	July 21, 2019	507	5.52	0.9/5
49	6	"Maulers vs. Brawlers and Descendants 3 vs. American Housewife"	July 28, 2019	506	5.62	0.8/5
50	7	"Milo & Camryn Manheim vs. Marissa Jaret Winokur and Bella Twins vs. MMA Fighters"	August 18, 2019	508	5.06	0.8/5
51	8	"Ninja vs. Juju and Jerry Springer vs. Doug Flutie"	August 25, 2019	509	5.21	0.8/5
52	9	"Terry Bradshaw vs. Adam Rippon and Skai Jackson vs. Hudson Yang"	September 15, 2019	510	4.79	0.8/4
53	10	"John Legend & Chrissy Teigen vs. The Cast of Vanderpump Rules and Ryan Lochte vs. Kevin Eubanks"	September 22, 2019	511	3.97	0.6/3
54	11	"black-ish vs. The Goldbergs"	September 29, 2019	502	5.43	1.0/4

=== Season 7 (2020) ===
No. overall	No. in season	Title	Original release date	Prod. code	U.S. viewers (millions)	Rating/share (18–49)
55	1	"Queer Eye: OG vs. Queer Eye: The New Class"	May 31, 2020	601	4.63	0.8/5
56	2	"Andy Cohen vs. The Real Housewives of Beverly Hills and Kevin Nealon vs. Drew Carey"	June 7, 2020	603	5.71	0.9/6
57	3	"The Bold Type vs. RuPaul's Drag Race"	June 14, 2020	605	5.26	0.8/6
58	4	"Cedric the Entertainer vs. Wayne Brady and The Hills: New Beginnings vs. Jersey Shore: Family Vacation"	June 28, 2020	604	5.56	0.8/5
59	5	"NFLPA Hall of Famers vs. NFLPA Rising Stars"	July 12, 2020	611	5.13	0.7/5
60	6	"Ray Romano vs. Brad Garrett and Fall Out Boy vs. Weezer"	September 20, 2020	610	4.15	0.5/3
61	7	"Kathie Lee Gifford vs. Ricki Lake and 2 Chainz vs. Big Boi"	September 24, 2020	606	5.26	0.7/4
62	8	"Joel McHale vs. Ben Feldman and Jesse Palmer vs CeeLo Green"	October 1, 2020	602	4.79	0.8/5
63	9	"NFLPA Legends vs. NFLPA Pro-Bowlers and Macklemore vs. Lil Yachty"	October 8, 2020	607	4.92	0.7/5
64	10	"Jenna Fischer and Angela Kinsey vs. Scott Foley and 'mixed-ish' vs. Disney Channel Moms"	October 13, 2020	608	3.23	0.7/5
65	11	"Boxers (WBC) vs. UFC and Sebastian Maniscalco vs. Jenifer Lewis"	October 29, 2020	609	5.30	0.7/5

=== Season 8 (2021) ===
No. overall	No. in season	Title	Original release date	Prod. code	U.S. viewers (millions)	Rating/share (18–49)
66	1	"Rob Lowe vs. Terrence Howard"	June 6, 2021	701	5.74	0.9/6
67	2	"Zach Braff and Donald Faison vs. Neil Flynn and Wendi McLendon-Covey vs. Patrick Warburton"	June 13, 2021	702	4.84	0.7/5
68	3	"Dee Snider vs. Terry Bradshaw and OneRepublic vs. Mayans M.C. Cast"	June 20, 2021	704	5.40	0.8/6
69	4	"JoJo Siwa vs. Charli and Dixie D'Amelio and Ross Mathews vs. Loni Love"	June 27, 2021	703	4.38	0.6/4
70	5	"Good Trouble vs. grown-ish and Million Dollar Listing LA vs. Million Dollar Listing NY"	July 18, 2021	705	4.84	0.6/5
71	6	"Nev Schulman vs. Jimmie Allen and Paul Reubens vs. David Arquette"	July 25, 2021	708	3.90	0.5/4
72	7	"Deon Cole vs. Tisha Campbell-Martin and Kevin Smith & Jason Mewes vs. Justin Long"	August 15, 2021	706	4.50	0.6/5
73	8	"Vivica A. Fox vs. Bill Bellamy and MLB Alums vs. MLB Wives"	August 22, 2021	710	4.75	0.6/5
74	9	"NFLPA All-Stars vs. NFLPA Legends and Oliver Hudson vs. Joe Buck"	August 29, 2021	709	4.56	0.6/4
75	10	"Fran Drescher vs. Charles Shaughnessy and Jessie James Decker and Eric Decker vs. Chris Bosh"	September 12, 2021	707	4.22	0.5/3
76	11	"Selling Sunset vs. Bling Empire and Pentatonix vs. Wilson Phillips"	September 19, 2021	711	4.13	0.5/3

=== Season 9 (2022) ===
No. overall	No. in season	Title	Original release date	Prod. code	U.S. viewers (millions)	Rating/share (18–49)
77	1	"Abbott Elementary vs. Hacks and Kal Penn vs. Erika Christensen"	July 10, 2022	804	4.96	0.7/7
78	2	"Salt-N-Pepa vs. The Proud Family and Bel-Air vs. Saved by the Bell"	July 17, 2022	801	4.18	0.5/5
79	3	"High School Musical: The Musical: The Series vs. Never Have I Ever and Ron Funches vs. Meagan Good"	July 24, 2022	805	4.21	0.5/5
80	4	"Boyz II Men vs. Amber Ruffin and Joe Lo Truglio vs. Thomas Lennon"	July 31, 2022	803	4.53	0.6/6
81	5	"Rhys Darby vs. Jay Pharoah and Bachelor Nation vs. Bachelor Squad"	August 7, 2022	802	4.73	0.5/5
82	6	"Kristin Chenoweth vs. Kathy Najimy and My Unorthodox Life vs. Summer House"	August 14, 2022	806	4.51	0.6/6
83	7	"Simu Liu vs. Nathan Chen and Monica vs. So So Def"	August 21, 2022	808	4.54	0.5/5
84	8	"Mysterio vs. The Miz and Kurt Warner vs. Orel Hershiser"	August 28, 2022	810	4.56	0.5/5
85	9	"The Sharks vs. The Talk and Natasha Leggero vs. Lauren Ash"	September 11, 2022	807	4.16	0.6/4
86	10	"NFLPA Moms vs. NFLPA Players and Holey Moley vs. Kimberly Williams-Paisley"	September 18, 2022	809	3.83	0.5/3
87	11	"The Cast of Jackass"	September 22, 2022	811	3.68	0.5/4

=== Season 10 (2023) ===
No. overall	No. in season	Title	Original release date	Prod. code	U.S. viewers (millions)	Rating/share (18–49)
88	1	"The Cast of Yellowjackets and Gayle King vs. Sophia Bush Hughes"	July 9, 2023	902	3.28	0.4/4
89	2	"Neil Patrick Harris vs. David Burtka & The Cast of Drag Me to Dinner and Nikki Glaser vs. Bebe Rexha"	July 16, 2023	909	2.91	0.3/4
90	3	"The Haunted Mansion Cast: Tiffany Haddish vs. Justin Simien and Cruel Summer vs. The Wonder Years"	July 23, 2023	903	2.92	0.3/4
91	4	"WWE Women vs. WWE Men and Marcus Lemonis vs. Bert Kreischer"	July 30, 2023	904	3.62	0.4/5
92	5	"NFLPA All Stars vs. NFLPA Hall of Fame and Adam DeVine vs. Anders Holm"	August 6, 2023	905	3.55	0.4/5
93	6	"Pete Holmes vs. Jared Padalecki and Real Housewives of OC vs. Real Housewives of ATL"	August 13, 2023	906	3.86	0.4/5
94	7	"Chris Redd vs. Fortune Feimster and Stephen A. Smith vs. Tamron Hall"	August 20, 2023	907	3.65	0.3/4
95	8	"The Rookie vs. The Rookie: Feds and Lauren Lapkus vs. June Diane Raphael"	August 27, 2023	908	3.60	0.4/4
96	9	"Dancing with the Stars vs. Grand Crew and Ben Schwartz vs. Sam Richardson"	September 19, 2023	901	3.46	0.5/5
97	10	"Rosie O'Donnell vs. Billy Porter"	December 13, 2023	910	4.03	0.5/5

=== Season 11 (2024) ===
No. overall	No. in season	Title	Original release date	Prod. code	U.S. viewers (millions)	Rating/share (18–49)
98	1	"Family Feud: Decades of Laughs"	July 9, 2024	N/A	N/A	N/A
99	2	"Megan Thee Stallion vs Ne-Yo and NFL vs Olympians"	July 9, 2024	1001	2.85	0.3/4
100	3	"Meghan Trainor vs Tori Kelly and Golden Bachelor vs Bachelor Nation"	July 16, 2024	1002	3.17	0.4/6
101	4	"Robin Thicke vs Anthony Anderson and Walker Hayes vs Rachel Bilson"	July 23, 2024	1003	3.13	0.3/5
102	5	"Daughtry vs Papa Roach and Earth, Wind & Fire vs The War & Treaty"	July 30, 2024	1004	2.52	0.3/3
103	6	"Fat Joe vs Gabriel "Fluffy" Iglesias and David Foster & Katharine McPhee vs Clay Aiken"	August 6, 2024	1005	2.80	0.3/3
104	7	"Flavor Flav vs Bobby Lee and Donny Osmond vs Ken Marino"	August 13, 2024	1006	3.40	0.4/5
105	8	"Men of WWE vs Women of WWE and Candace Parker vs Lisa Leslie"	August 20, 2024	1008	2.60	0.3/4
106	9	"Fantasy Sweets vs Golden Five and 9-1-1 vs Jury Duty"	September 16, 2024	1009	3.15	0.3/4
107	10	"Chrissy Teigen & John Legend vs David Chang and Deadliest Catch vs Star Trek"	September 16, 2024	1007	2.73	0.3/3
108	11	"Family Feud: The Best of Steve Harvey"	September 16, 2024	N/A	2.18	0.2/2
109	12	"Shaq vs. Sherri Shepherd"	December 4, 2024	1010	2.24	0.3/3

=== Season 12 (2025) ===
No. overall	No. in season	Title	Original release date	Prod. code	U.S. viewers (millions)	Rating/share (18–49)
110	1	"Taraji P. Henson vs Jennifer Hudson and The Dan Patrick Show vs The Rich Eisen Show"	July 10, 2025	1101	4.16	0.4/8
111	2	"Matt Rife vs Lil Jon and Kat Graham vs Francia Raisa"	July 17, 2025	1102	3.84	0.3/7
112	3	"The Arquettes vs Martina McBride and Patti LaBelle vs Fantasia"	July 24, 2025	1103	3.78	0.4/8
113	4	"Diplo vs Laverne Cox and General Hospital vs The Young and the Restless"	July 31, 2025	1104	3.84	0.3/6
114	5	"Kyle Richards vs Kandi Burruss-Tucker and NFL Offense vs NFLPA Defense"	August 7, 2025	1105	3.52	0.3/5
115	6	"The Harlem Globetrotters vs The Dallas Cowboys Cheerleaders and Bridget Everett vs Vanessa Bayer"	August 14, 2025	1106	3.86	0.3/6
116	7	"Normani vs Michelle Buteau and Andy Richter vs Jason Ritter"	August 21, 2025	1107	3.50	0.3/5
117	8	"Lainey Wilson vs Leanne Morgan and Jordan Chiles vs Stephen Nedoroscik"	September 11, 2025	1108	3.24	0.3/3
118	9	"George Wallace vs Lil Rel Howery and Bobby Flay vs Carla Hall"	September 18, 2025	1109	3.03	0.4/4
119	10	"The Housemaid vs. The Housewives All-Stars Holiday Special"	December 4, 2025	1110	N/A	TBA

=== Season 13 (2026) ===
No. overall	No. in season	Title	Original release date	Prod. code	U.S. viewers (millions)	Rating/share (18–49)
120	1	"AFC Champions vs NFC Champions"	July 9, 2026	1201	N/A	TBA
121	2	"Sheila E. vs En Vogue and Lisa Lisa vs Taylor Dayne"	July 16, 2026	1202	N/A	TBA
122	3	"Dave Portnoy & Barstool Sports vs Cooper Flagg and Team USA Women's Hockey vs Team USA Men's Hockey"	July 23, 2026	1203	N/A	TBA
123	4	"2 Chainz vs Eric André and Zac Brown & Kendra Scott vs Mickey Guyton"	July 30, 2026	1204	N/A	TBA
124	5	"Julie Bowen vs Yvette Nicole Brown and Chris O'Donnell vs Wayne Brady"	August 6, 2026	1205	N/A	TBA
125	6	"Nicole Byer vs Margaret Cho and Kathy Hilton vs Da Brat"	August 13, 2026	1206	N/A	TBA
126	7	"Bow Wow vs Rickey Smiley and Steve Aoki vs Joel Kim Booster"	August 20, 2026	1207	N/A	TBA
127	8	"American Idol Men vs American Idol Women"	December 3, 2026	1208	TBD	TBA
