= Jersey Shore: Family Vacation =

American reality show

- Genre: Reality
- Created by: SallyAnn Salsano
- Developed by: SallyAnn Salsano
- Starring: Pauly D; Nicole Polizzi; Mike Sorrentino; Ronnie Ortiz-Magro; Jenni Farley; Vinny Guadagnino; Deena Cortese; Angelina Pivarnick; Sammi Giancola
- Opening theme: "Get Crazy" by LMFAO
- Country of origin: United States
- Original language: English
- No. of seasons: 8
- No. of episodes: 236

Production
- Executive producers: SallyAnn Salsano; Frank Miccolis; Scott Jeffress; Jacquelyn French; Velia Lopez
- Production locations: Miami; Las Vegas; New Jersey; Los Angeles; New Orleans
- Running time: 42 minutes
- Production companies: 495 Productions; Paramount Television Studios

Original release
- Network: MTV
- Release: April 5, 2018 – September 3, 2026

Related
- Jersey Shore; Snooki & Jwoww; The Pauly D Project; The Show with Vinny; Floribama Shore; Buckhead Shore; All Star Shore; Canada Shore

Jersey Shore: Family Vacation is an American reality television series that premiered globally on April 5, 2018, on MTV. The series is a revival, sequel, and reunion series of the reality television series Jersey Shore, which ran from 2009 to 2012.

== Production ==
On November 27, 2017, MTV announced that the cast (with the exception of Sammi Giancola) would be reuniting in Miami, Florida, for a new reunion season titled Jersey Shore: Family Vacation. The series premiered globally in nearly 180 countries on April 5, 2018. Most of production took place in Miami, with some additional filming in parts of New Jersey, Staten Island, and Las Vegas. This season also featured a trip to Resorts World Bimini, located in The Bahamas.

On February 28, 2018, a second season was ordered ahead of the series premiere. The second season premiered on August 23, 2018, and began with a vacation to Las Vegas. The remainder of filming took place in various New Jersey locations including Seaside Heights, Atlantic City, Manalapan, and Point Pleasant. The second half of season two premiered on July 11, 2019, and focused around Sorrentino's court sentencing for tax evasion and his wedding. Filming locations included Stony Creek Ranch Resort in Stony Creek, NY, and The Legacy Castle located in Pompton Plains, NJ.

On December 13, 2018, MTV renewed the series for a third season and premiered on August 22, 2019. The third season featured: Sorrentino going to prison; Ortiz-Magro going to rehab; Cortese and Polizzi's newborn babies; Farley's divorce and new boyfriend; Pivarnick's wedding plans; and Guadagnino's Chippendales residency. Filming took place in various locations including Los Angeles, Las Vegas, Point Pleasant, Holmdel, and Washington, D.C. The second half of season three premiered on February 27, 2020. It included the celebration of Pivarnick's bachelorette party and wedding, along with the return of Sorrentino. Filming took place in Manalapan, Asbury Park, New Orleans, and the Park Chateau Estate and Gardens in East Brunswick.

On June 25, 2020, the series was renewed for a fourth season, which premiered on November 19, 2020. The season begins with the aftermath of the infamous speech given by Nicole, Jenni, and Deena at Angelina's wedding. Since the wedding, Polizzi decided to leave the show; Jenni and Deena are still not on speaking terms with Angelina; Mike and Lauren Sorrentino are trying to get pregnant; and Pauly D has a new girlfriend. All of this builds up to the whole world shutting down due to the COVID-19 pandemic. The fourth season began filming with production in August 2020, during the COVID-19 pandemic. The beginning of the season featured some self-shot footage and Zoom calls with the cast members. After months in quarantine, the cast and crew were back in production at the Hilton Lake Las Vegas Resort in September and October 2020. The entire resort was rented out in order to film within a quarantine bubble adhering to local, state and federal COVID-19 health and safety requirements during their stay. Lauren's role was increased to fill in as the fourth female cast member in Nicole's absence. The second half of season four premiered on June 3, 2021. Filming took place at various locations in New Jersey, Las Vegas, and Los Angeles, as well as a vacation to the Woodloch Resort in the Pocono Mountains. It was speculated for Nicole to be making a return to the show in some capacity, after she was spotted having lunch with Angelina in Florham Park, New Jersey. This was officially confirmed on May 11, 2021, when MTV released the teaser for Season 4B featuring Nicole's return. On April 22, 2021, Ronnie was arrested for domestic violence. At the time of his arrest, Ronnie was on probation as a result of his October 2019 domestic violence incident. He was released shortly after on a $100,000 bond. On May 13, 2021, Ronnie announced that he was stepping back from the show to focus on his mental health.

On September 2, 2021, MTV renewed the series for a fifth season with Nicole returning as a main cast member. The season premiered on January 6, 2022. The first half of season five filmed in New Jersey and Las Vegas as well as a trip to Los Angeles, and a vacation to the Florida Keys at the Isla Bella Beach Resort. Filming for the second half of season five resumed shortly after the holidays, with the cast being spotted in El Paso, Texas and later in San Diego, California. The second half of season five premiered on June 23, 2022. In 2022, A Double Shot at Love star and girlfriend of DJ Pauly D, Nikki Hall, stepped away from the public eye after an on-screen disagreement with castmate Angelina Pivarnick.

On December 22, 2022, it was announced that the sixth season would premiere on January 26, 2023. The season filmed in various locations across the country including New Jersey, New York City, North Carolina, South Carolina, Connecticut, Los Angeles, Santa Barbara, and New Orleans, and also highlighted Vinny competing on the thirty-first season of Dancing with the Stars. On March 11, 2023, it was announced that former castmate Sammi Giancola would be returning to the series for the show's second half of the sixth season, which premiered on August 3, 2023. Filming included trips to the Poconos, Atlantic City, and Margaritaville Resort Orlando.

On December 7, 2023, MTV renewed the series for a seventh season, which premiered on February 8, 2024. For the first time, since the series premiered, all nine cast members appeared together under the same roof, in the same season. Filming took place in Atlantic City, Seaside Heights, Nashville, and Tucson. The second half of season seven premiered on September 19, 2024. Filming took place in Las Vegas, New York City, and Miami. Nikki Hall returned after stepping back from filming for a season and a half.

In April 2025, it was announced that the eighth season would premiere on May 29, 2025, celebrating 15 years since the original show premiered on MTV. Filming took place in Cape May, New Jersey and Jamaica, along with a return to the original house in Seaside Heights. For the first time ever, all nine cast members returned to the shore house at the same time to celebrate the 15th anniversary. On March 4, 2026, it was announced that the second half of season eight would be the last and that the final episodes would begin airing on May 7, 2026. Despite some reports of the final season being considered Season 9, MTV officially aired the season as the second half of Season 8. Filming took place in Boston, Massachusetts, and various locations across New Jersey.

== Cast ==
Cast member	Seasons														
Cast member	1	2a	2b	3a	3b	4a	4b	5a	5b	6a	6b	7a	7b	8a	8b
Paul "Pauly D" DelVecchio	Main	Main	Main	Main	Main	Main	Main	Main	Main	Main	Main	Main	Main	Main	Main
Nicole "Snooki" Polizzi	Main	Main	Main	Main	Main		Recurring	Main	Main	Main	Main	Main	Main	Main	Main
Mike "The Situation" Sorrentino	Main	Main	Main	Main	Main	Main	Main	Main	Main	Main	Main	Main	Main	Main	Main
Ronnie Ortiz-Magro	Main	Main	Main	Main	Main	Main	Main	Guest	Guest	Guest	Recurring	Recurring	Recurring	Recurring	Main
Jenni "JWoww" Farley	Main	Main	Main	Main	Main	Main	Main	Main	Main	Main	Main	Main	Main	Main	Main
Vinny Guadagnino	Main	Main	Main	Main	Main	Main	Main	Main	Main	Main	Main	Main	Main	Main	Main
Deena Cortese	Main	Main	Main	Main	Main	Main	Main	Main	Main	Main	Main	Main	Main	Main	Main
Angelina Pivarnick	Recurring	Recurring	Main	Main	Main	Main	Main	Main	Main	Main	Main	Main	Main	Main	Main
Sammi "Sweetheart" Giancola											Main	Main	Main	Main	Main
Recurring cast
Lauren Sorrentino	Recurring	Recurring	Recurring	Recurring	Recurring	Recurring	Recurring	Recurring	Recurring	Recurring	Recurring	Recurring	Recurring	Recurring	Recurring
Nikki Hall						Recurring	Recurring	Recurring	Recurring				Recurring	Recurring	Recurring

== Episodes ==
=== Series overview ===
Season	Episodes		Originally released	
Season	Episodes		First released	Last released
1	14		April 5, 2018	June 28, 2018
2	27	17	August 23, 2018	December 13, 2018
2	27	10	July 11, 2019	August 15, 2019
3	29	13	August 22, 2019	November 19, 2019
3	29	16	February 27, 2020	June 18, 2020
4	28	14	November 19, 2020	February 25, 2021
4	28	14	June 3, 2021	September 2, 2021
5	31	12	January 6, 2022	March 24, 2022
5	31	19	June 23, 2022	October 20, 2022
6	35	17	January 26, 2023	May 18, 2023
6	35	18	August 3, 2023	December 7, 2023
7	36	18	February 8, 2024	May 23, 2024
7	36	18	September 19, 2024	January 23, 2025
8	36	18	May 29, 2025	September 25, 2025
8	36	18	May 7, 2026	September 3, 2026

=== Season 1 (2018) ===
No. overall	No. in season	Title	Original release date	U.S. viewers (millions)
1	1	"What's in the Bag?"	April 5, 2018	2.42
2	2	"The Ring"	April 5, 2018	2.56
3	3	"Sunday Vinday"	April 12, 2018	1.68
4	4	"Ron Ron Juice"	April 19, 2018	1.74
5	5	"About Last Night"	April 26, 2018	1.45
6	6	"Meatball Down"	May 3, 2018	1.51
7	7	"Baby Mama Drama"	May 10, 2018	1.76
8	8	"The Temptation of the Keto Guido"	May 17, 2018	1.70
9	9	"Umm, Hello"	May 24, 2018	1.64
10	10	"Meatball Training Day"	May 31, 2018	2.03
11	11	"Angelina Leaves Her Mark!"	June 7, 2018	1.65
12	12	"JWoww vs. the Proposal"	June 14, 2018	1.65
13	13	"Future Mrs. Situation?"	June 21, 2018	1.66
14	14	"The Final Supper"	June 28, 2018	1.64

=== Season 2 (2018–2019) ===
No. overall	No. in season	Title	Original release date	U.S. viewers (millions)
Part 1
15	1	"It's Complicated"	August 23, 2018	1.36
16	2	"Oh Canada"	August 23, 2018	1.36
17	3	"The Truth About Ronnie"	August 30, 2018	1.34
18	4	"Heartbreak Hotel"	September 6, 2018	1.43
19	5	"Frenemies"	September 13, 2018	1.47
20	6	"The Designation"	September 20, 2018	1.28
21	7	"Four Guidos and a Baby"	September 27, 2018	1.22
22	8	"Back to Seaside"	October 4, 2018	1.05
23	9	"Vinny and Angelina: A Love Story"	October 11, 2018	1.15
24	10	"What a Drag"	October 18, 2018	1.11
25	11	"Awkward City"	October 25, 2018	1.25
26	12	"Where's the Beach?"	November 1, 2018	1.26
27	13	"Staten Island Smackdown"	November 8, 2018	1.28
28	14	"Jewish Barbie"	November 15, 2018	1.21
29	15	"Pork Roll or Taylor Ham?"	November 29, 2018	1.13
30	16	"Wallopin' in Manalapan"	December 6, 2018	1.13
31	17	"Ronnie Magro's Series of Unfortunate Events"	December 13, 2018	1.17
Part 2
32	18	"The United States vs. The Situation (Part 1)"	July 11, 2019	1.09
33	19	"The United States vs. The Situation (Part 2)"	July 11, 2019	1.05
34	20	"Secaucus!"	July 18, 2019	0.92
35	21	"The Dude Ranch"	July 18, 2019	0.81
36	22	"Ranchelor Party"	July 25, 2019	0.79
37	23	"Not Again"	August 1, 2019	0.74
38	24	"Where's Ronnie?"	August 1, 2019	0.73
39	25	"Tuxedo Time"	August 8, 2019	0.66
40	26	"The Hitch-uation (Part 1)"	August 8, 2019	0.70
41	27	"The Hitch-uation (Part 2)"	August 15, 2019	1.01

=== Season 3 (2019–2020) ===
No. overall	No. in season	Title	Original release date	U.S. viewers (millions)
Part 1
42	1	"Goodbye Mike"	August 22, 2019	0.94
43	2	"Thirty Days Later"	August 29, 2019	0.87
44	3	"JWoww Gets Her Groove Back"	September 5, 2019	0.82
45	4	"Gym, Tan, Strip"	September 12, 2019	0.92
46	5	"Sliding Into Angelina's DMs"	September 19, 2019	0.98
47	6	"Strippendales"	September 26, 2019	0.84
48	7	"The Incident at the Strip Club"	October 3, 2019	0.96
49	8	"Millennials"	October 10, 2019	1.11
50	9	"Holy Drama"	October 17, 2019	1.19
51	10	"4 Fists. 2 Bottles. 1 Shore House."	October 24, 2019	1.10
52	11	"Last Night Is Canceled"	October 31, 2019	0.80
53	12	"Snooki Goes to Washington (Part 1)"	November 7, 2019	0.84
54	13	"Snooki Goes to Washington (Part 2)"	November 7, 2019	0.76
Part 2
55	14	"Only in Jersey"	February 27, 2020	0.92
56	15	"Back to the Jersey Shore"	March 5, 2020	0.96
57	16	"Psychic Larges"	March 12, 2020	0.90
58	17	"Single J-Woww"	March 19, 2020	0.83
59	18	"Chicken Cutlets and Ketchup"	March 26, 2020	0.96
60	19	"The Shorefather"	April 2, 2020	0.91
61	20	"Prenups and Misdemeanors"	April 9, 2020	0.80
62	21	"Unresolved Issues"	April 16, 2020	0.89
63	22	"Crash the Bachelorette"	April 23, 2020	0.87
64	23	"Beignets, Blow Up Dolls and Bridesmaids"	April 30, 2020	0.90
65	24	"P-Woww"	May 7, 2020	0.84
66	25	"So That Happened!"	May 14, 2020	0.86
67	26	"Rewriting History"	May 28, 2020	0.81
68	27	"You Had Me at Um, Hello!"	June 4, 2020	0.88
69	28	"The Speech, Part 1"	June 11, 2020	0.93
70	29	"The Speech, Part 2"	June 18, 2020	1.09

=== Season 4 (2020–2021) ===
No. overall	No. in season	Title	Original release date	U.S. viewers (millions)
Part 1
71	1	"The Mediation"	November 19, 2020	0.90
72	2	"Taken Pauly"	November 19, 2020	0.74
73	3	"The Double Book"	November 26, 2020	0.59
74	4	"Single Ronnie"	December 3, 2020	0.70
75	5	"Trouble Shot at Love"	December 10, 2020	0.67
76	6	"Jurassic Angelina"	December 17, 2020	0.66
77	7	"The Text"	January 7, 2021	0.75
78	8	"Attack of the Killer Raccoons"	January 14, 2021	0.67
79	9	"Somebody's Wifey's in Town"	January 21, 2021	0.63
80	10	"The Return of JWOWW"	January 28, 2021	0.75
81	11	"The Note 2.0"	February 4, 2021	0.74
82	12	"Calling Dr. Drew"	February 11, 2021	0.59
83	13	"The Wedding Redo"	February 18, 2021	0.61
84	14	"The Speech, Part 3"	February 25, 2021	0.61
Part 2
85	15	"Ummmm...Hello, 2021"	June 3, 2021	0.58
86	16	"The Party's Back"	June 10, 2021	0.53
87	17	"The Streets Are Talking"	June 17, 2021	0.59
88	18	"Welcome to the Poconos"	June 24, 2021	0.55
89	19	"Mr. P"	July 1, 2021	0.65
90	20	"Italian Ice"	July 8, 2021	0.50
91	21	"Guido Mania"	July 15, 2021	0.53
92	22	"Guido Mania 2"	July 22, 2021	0.53
93	23	"Guidos on Ice"	July 29, 2021	0.49
94	24	"Surprise! It's a Snooki"	August 5, 2021	0.40
95	25	"The SS Side Piece"	August 12, 2021	0.45
96	26	"Worst Talent Show Ever"	August 19, 2021	0.54
97	27	"Best Birthday Ever"	August 26, 2021	0.50
98	28	"Medic!"	September 2, 2021	0.41

=== Season 5 (2022) ===
No. overall	No. in season	Title	Original release date	U.S. viewers (millions)
Part 1
99	1	"Deliveries and Deadlines"	January 6, 2022	0.59
100	2	"Snooki vs. the Rock"	January 13, 2022	0.53
101	3	"Hollywood Shore"	January 20, 2022	0.58
102	4	"Meatballs Don't Hike"	January 27, 2022	0.66
103	5	"Two Baptisms and a Pet Psychic"	February 3, 2022	0.49
104	6	"The Blessification"	February 10, 2022	0.51
105	7	"The Not-So-International Vacation"	February 17, 2022	0.49
106	8	"Deena's Revenge"	February 24, 2022	0.53
107	9	"Happy Birthday, Vinny!"	March 3, 2022	0.43
108	10	"Best Party Planner Ever"	March 10, 2022	0.46
109	11	"The Sexpert"	March 17, 2022	0.44
110	12	"The Lie Detector Test"	March 24, 2022	0.43
Part 2
111	13	"Livin' La Vida Loca"	June 23, 2022	0.37
112	14	"Spill the Tea"	June 30, 2022	0.41
113	15	"Old Mike vs. New Mike"	July 7, 2022	0.43
114	16	"El Paso (Part 1)"	July 14, 2022	0.41
115	17	"El Paso (Part 2)"	July 21, 2022	0.34
116	18	"Messy Mike"	July 28, 2022	0.50
117	19	"Mike vs. the World"	August 4, 2022	0.43
118	20	"The Meatball Show"	August 11, 2022	0.41
119	21	"The Pool Party"	August 18, 2022	0.39
120	22	"It's Fine, I Work Here."	August 25, 2022	0.42
121	23	"Lola the Bunny"	September 1, 2022	0.42
122	24	"Dren"	September 8, 2022	0.38
123	25	"The Staten Island Notebook"	September 15, 2022	0.44
124	26	"Wild 'N Out: Jersey Style"	September 22, 2022	0.39
125	27	"Knock Knock! Who's There?"	September 29, 2022	0.38
126	28	"Another Day, Another Crisis"	October 6, 2022	0.49
127	29	"Vin Day"	October 13, 2022	0.39
128	30	"Reunion (Part 1)"	October 20, 2022	0.33
129	31	"Reunion (Part 2)"	October 20, 2022	0.27

=== Season 6 (2023) ===
No. overall	No. in season	Title	Original release date	U.S. viewers (millions)
Part 1
130	1	"Where's the Charcuterie?"	January 26, 2023	0.51
131	2	"Sliding Into DMs"	February 2, 2023	0.41
132	3	"Lake Jersey"	February 9, 2023	0.40
133	4	"Life of a Cornstar"	February 16, 2023	0.43
134	5	"Get Your Sack in the Hole"	February 23, 2023	0.38
135	6	"Messy Mawmas"	March 2, 2023	0.41
136	7	"Skoal!"	March 9, 2023	0.45
137	8	"Dancing with the Chooch"	March 16, 2023	0.37
138	9	"What a Waste of Cake"	March 23, 2023	0.42
139	10	"Operation Mike Drop"	March 30, 2023	0.42
140	11	"F.F.D. 2"	April 6, 2023	0.44
141	12	"Divorce Party"	April 13, 2023	0.42
142	13	"Birthday Party"	April 20, 2023	0.41
143	14	"Engagement Party"	April 27, 2023	0.36
144	15	"The Hangover"	May 4, 2023	0.42
145	16	"Reunion (Part 1)"	May 11, 2023	0.32
146	17	"Reunion (Part 2)"	May 18, 2023	0.20
Part 2
147	18	"Remember Me?"	August 3, 2023	0.47
148	19	"Code Word: Lasagna"	August 10, 2023	0.49
149	20	"Just Like Old Times"	August 17, 2023	0.34
150	21	"The Mothership"	August 24, 2023	0.37
151	22	"The Sweetest Birthday"	August 31, 2023	0.39
152	23	"Meatball Stakeout"	September 7, 2023	0.37
153	24	"Charcuterie Party"	September 14, 2023	0.34
154	25	"Margarita Problems!"	September 21, 2023	0.31
155	26	"Fasten Your Seatbelt"	September 28, 2023	0.38
156	27	"Sammi's New Man"	October 5, 2023	0.34
157	28	"Strip Steak"	October 12, 2023	0.37
158	29	"Deena Makes a Friend"	October 19, 2023	0.36
159	30	"Frozen Pizza and Margaritas"	October 26, 2023	0.46
160	31	"Tequila and Theories"	November 2, 2023	0.41
161	32	"Dirty Try Out"	November 9, 2023	0.42
162	33	"Just Flip the Table"	November 16, 2023	0.34
163	34	"Reunion (Part 1)"	November 30, 2023	0.25
164	35	"Reunion (Part 2)"	December 7, 2023	0.26

=== Season 7 (2024–2025) ===
No. overall	No. in season	Title	Original release date	U.S. viewers (millions)
Part 1
165	1	"Paparazzi, Poppas, and Publications"	February 8, 2024	0.40
166	2	"Reality Check"	February 15, 2024	0.38
167	3	"Snooki Night"	February 22, 2024	0.40
168	4	"Jersey Shore Day"	February 29, 2024	0.40
169	5	"Straight to Seaside"	March 7, 2024	0.36
170	6	"Jets Day"	March 14, 2024	0.33
171	7	"Family Meeting"	March 21, 2024	0.31
172	8	"Rhinestone Cowboy"	March 28, 2024	0.37
173	9	"Music City Meatballs"	April 4, 2024	0.39
174	10	"Sam and Ron"	April 11, 2024	0.46
175	11	"Jersey Hot Chicken Challenge"	April 18, 2024	0.39
176	12	"Are You Friends with Her?"	April 25, 2024	0.34
177	13	"Jersey Shore Fan Club?"	May 2, 2024	0.43
178	14	"Ronnie, Sammi and Justin"	May 9, 2024	0.41
179	15	"OG Night"	May 16, 2024	0.39
180	16	"Happy Birthday Snooki!"	May 16, 2024	0.32
181	17	"Reunion (Part 1)"	May 23, 2024	0.30
182	18	"Reunion (Part 2)"	May 23, 2024	0.25
Part 2
183	19	"The Meatball Party"	September 19, 2024	0.30
184	20	"Pauly's New House"	September 26, 2024	0.24
185	21	"The Bunker"	October 3, 2024	0.24
186	22	"The Meme"	October 10, 2024	0.25
187	23	"Sue Joey"	October 17, 2024	0.25
188	24	"What Happens In Vegas..."	October 24, 2024	0.24
189	25	"The Feast of Peace"	October 31, 2024	0.22
190	26	"A Telenovela"	November 7, 2024	0.27
191	27	"The Big Apple"	November 14, 2024	0.18
192	28	"No More Pizza!"	November 21, 2024	0.19
193	29	"Deena's Family Vacation"	December 5, 2024	0.24
194	30	"Scavenger Hunt"	December 12, 2024	0.19
195	31	"Behind Closed Doors"	December 19, 2024	0.24
196	32	"Yacht Day"	December 26, 2024	0.27
197	33	"Do You Love Him?"	January 2, 2025	0.32
198	34	"Goodbye Miami"	January 9, 2025	0.28
199	35	"Reunion (Part 1)"	January 16, 2025	0.26
200	36	"Reunion (Part 2)"	January 23, 2025	0.23

=== Season 8 (2025–2026) ===
No. overall	No. in season	Title	Original release date	U.S. viewers (millions)
201	1	"Back to School"	May 29, 2025	0.30
202	2	"Running...for Pizza!"	June 5, 2025	0.28
203	3	"Family Meeting"	June 12, 2025	0.23
204	4	"South Jersey"	June 19, 2025	0.44
205	5	"Down to Farm"	June 26, 2025	0.29
206	6	"Eggcellent"	July 3, 2025	0.17
207	7	"Baby Making Cologne"	July 10, 2025	0.26
208	8	"Jamaica Bound"	July 17, 2025	0.36
209	9	"Jamaican Heat"	July 24, 2025	0.32
210	10	"Jamaican Beef"	July 31, 2025	0.33
211	11	"Guido Bobsled Team"	August 7, 2025	0.19
212	12	"Last Shot at Love with Vinny G"	August 14, 2025	0.24
213	13	"Come On Eileen"	August 21, 2025	0.26
214	14	"Angelina's Revenge"	August 28, 2025	0.25
215	15	"1209 Ocean Terrace"	September 4, 2025	0.30
216	16	"Happy Anniversary"	September 11, 2025	0.27
217	17	"Reunion (Part 1)"	September 18, 2025	0.17
218	18	"Reunion (Part 2)"	September 25, 2025	0.17
Part 2
219	19	"Lordy Lordy Look Who's Forty"	May 7, 2026	0.21
220	20	"Say Yes to the Dress"	May 14, 2026	0.24
221	21	"Take Me Out to the Ballgame"	May 21, 2026	0.28
222	22	"The Mayor of Tendie Town"	May 28, 2026	0.35
223	23	"Back to School"	June 4, 2026	0.30
224	24	"Meatballs vs Boston"	June 11, 2026	0.26
225	25	"The Jamptons"	June 18, 2026	0.31
226	26	"Double Booked"	June 25, 2026	0.29
227	27	"BDS Event Planning"	July 2, 2026	0.18
228	28	"It's a Boy!"	July 9, 2026	0.32
229	29	"Diapers and DMs"	July 16, 2026	0.31
230	30	"Battle of the Paddles"	July 23, 2026	N/A
231	31	"No Longer Under Construction…"	July 30, 2026	N/A
232	32	"The Situation & Ronnie"	August 6, 2026	N/A
233	33	"New Beginnings"	August 13, 2026	N/A
234	34	"The Calm Before the Roast"	August 20, 2026	N/A
235	35	"The Jersey Shore Roast"	August 27, 2026	N/A
236	36	"40, Forever, and Farewell"	September 3, 2026	N/A

== Specials ==
Featured season	Title	Original release date
1	"Road to Vacation: Jersey Shore's Hottest Hookups"	March 15, 2018
1	"Road to Vacation: Jersey Shore's Biggest Blowups"	March 22, 2018
1	"Road to Vacation: Jersey Shore's Snookiest Moments"	March 29, 2018
1	"Road to Vacation: Jersey Shore's Craziest Couplings"	March 29, 2018
1	"Most Jersiest Moments"	July 5, 2018
2	"A Very Jersey Friendsgiving"	November 15, 2018
2	"Unseen Moments You Can't Unsee"	December 20, 2018
3	"10 Fist Pumping Years"	November 7, 2019
3	"Road to Vacation: Last Season's Jerziest Moments"	November 5, 2020
3	"Road to Vacation: An UnShoregettable Wedding"	November 12, 2020
4	"The Season Beshore the Season"	May 27, 2021
4	"The Meatball Day Wrap Up Special"	September 9, 2021
5	"12 Days of Jerzmas"	December 16, 2021
5	"Jerztory: How Jersey Shore Changed TV"	September 8, 2022
6	"Deena's All Star Family Fun Dinner"	May 25, 2023
6	"Gym, Tan, Rewind: Jersey Shore Watchback"	December 14, 2023
8	"How Jerzstory Was Made: Celebrating 15 Years of Jersey Shore"	May 24, 2025

== Home media ==
On September 25, 2018, the first season was released on DVD.

== Reception ==
=== Ratings ===
Viewership and ratings per season of Jersey Shore: Family Vacation
Season	Timeslot (ET)	Episodes	First aired		Last aired		TV season
Season	Timeslot (ET)	Episodes	Date	Viewers (millions)	Date	Viewers (millions)	TV season
1	Thursday 8:00 pm	14	April 5, 2018	2.42	June 28, 2018	1.64	2017–18
2	Thursday 8:00 pm	27	August 23, 2018	1.36	August 15, 2019	1.01	2018–19
3	Thursday 8:00 pm	29	August 22, 2019	0.94	June 18, 2020	1.09	2019–20
4	Thursday 8:00 pm	28	November 19, 2020	0.90	September 2, 2021	0.41	2020–21
5	Thursday 8:00 pm	31	January 6, 2022	0.59	October 20, 2022	0.27	2021–22
6	Thursday 8:00 pm	35	January 26, 2023	0.51	December 7, 2023	0.26	2022–23
7	Thursday 8:00 pm	36	February 8, 2024	0.40	January 23, 2025	0.23	2023–24
8	Thursday 8:00 pm	36	May 29, 2025	0.30	September 3, 2026	TBD	2025–26

=== Awards and nominations ===
Year	Award	Nominee	Category	Result
2018	People's Choice Awards	Jersey Shore: Family Vacation	The Revival Show of 2018	Nominated
2018	People's Choice Awards	Jersey Shore: Family Vacation	The Reality Show of 2018	Nominated
2018	People's Choice Awards	Nicole "Snooki" Polizzi	The Reality TV Star of 2018	Nominated
2018	People's Choice Awards	Paul "Pauly D" DelVecchio	The Reality TV Star of 2018	Nominated
2019	MTV Movie & TV Awards	Jersey Shore: Family Vacation	Best Reality Royalty	Nominated
2019	People's Choice Awards	Jersey Shore: Family Vacation	The Reality Show of 2019	Nominated
2019	American Reality Television Awards	Jersey Shore: Family Vacation	Outstanding Docu-Series	Won
2021	MTV Movie & TV Awards	Jersey Shore: Family Vacation	Best Docu-Reality Show	Won
2021	MTV Movie & TV Awards	Jersey Shore: Family Vacation	Best Reality Cast	Nominated
2021	MTV Movie & TV Awards	Jersey Shore: Family Vacation	Reality Royalty Lifetime Achievement	Won
2021	People's Choice Awards	Jersey Shore: Family Vacation	The Reality Show of 2021	Nominated
2021	People's Choice Awards	Nicole "Snooki" Polizzi	The Reality TV Star of 2021	Nominated
2021	People's Choice Awards	Mike "The Situation" Sorrentino	The Reality TV Star of 2021	Nominated
2022	MTV Movie & TV Awards	Jersey Shore: Family Vacation	Best Docu-Reality Show	Nominated
2023	MTV Movie & TV Awards	Jersey Shore: Family Vacation	Best Docu-Reality Show	Nominated
2023	MTV Movie & TV Awards	Michael "The Situation" Sorrentino, Vinny Guadagnino, Pauly D (MVP)	Best Reality On-Screen Team	Nominated
2023	American Reality Television Awards	Nicole "Snooki" Polizzi	Reality Royalty Award	Nominated
2023	American Reality Television Awards	Jersey Shore: Family Vacation	Best Returning Cast	Won
2023	American Reality Television Awards	Jersey Shore: Family Vacation	Outstanding Docu-Series	Nominated
2024	People's Choice Awards	Mike "The Situation" Sorrentino	The Reality TV Star of the Year	Nominated
2024	People's Choice Awards	Jersey Shore: Family Vacation	The Reality Show of the Year	Nominated
2024	American Reality Television Awards	Paul "Pauly D" DelVecchio	Reality King	Won
2024	American Reality Television Awards	Mike "The Situation" Sorrentino	Reality King	Nominated
2024	American Reality Television Awards	Jersey Shore: Family Vacation	Outstanding Recurring Cast	Won
2024	American Reality Television Awards	Jersey Shore: Family Vacation	Outstanding Production Crew	Won
2024	American Reality Television Awards	Jersey Shore: Family Vacation	Reality TV Moment	Nominated
2026	American Reality Television Awards	Paul "Pauly D" DelVecchio	Reality King	Won
2026	American Reality Television Awards	Mike "The Situation" Sorrentino	Reality King	Nominated
2026	American Reality Television Awards	Nicole "Snooki" Polizzi	Reality Queen	Nominated
2026	American Reality Television Awards	Jenni "JWoww" Farley	Reality Queen	Nominated
2026	American Reality Television Awards	Jersey Shore: Family Vacation	Outstanding Production Crew	Won
2026	American Reality Television Awards	Jersey Shore: Family Vacation	Outstanding Docu-Series	Nominated
2026	American Reality Television Awards	Jersey Shore: Family Vacation	Outstanding Recurring Cast	Nominated
