= Celebrity Family Feud =

American game show

- Genre: Game show
- Based on: Family Feud by Mark Goodson
- Directed by: Ken Fuchs
- Presented by: Al Roker; Steve Harvey
- Announcer: Burton Richardson; Rubin Ervin
- Theme music composer: Walt Levinsky
- Country of origin: United States
- Original language: English
- No. of seasons: 13
- No. of episodes: 126 (list of episodes)

Production
- Executive producers: Steve Harvey (seasons 2–present); Myeshia Mizuno
- Running time: 45–48 minutes
- Production companies: Fremantle (Note: Credited as FremantleMedia North America for Seasons 1 to 5.); Feudin' Productions (2008); Triple Threat Productions (2015–present)

Original release
- Network: NBC
- Release: June 24 – July 29, 2008
- Network: ABC
- Release: June 21, 2015 – present

Celebrity Family Feud is a broadcast network spin-off of the syndicated American game show Family Feud. The show first aired on NBC from June 24 to July 29, 2008, and began airing on ABC on June 21, 2015. Like the primetime All-Star Specials aired during the late 1970s and early 1980s by the show's then-network home ABC, the episodes feature celebrities and their real families, or teams of celebrities playing as a 'family' for charity, rather than the regular format of ordinary families playing for cash and prizes.

Since 2015, the series has aired as part of ABC's "Summer Fun & Games" block of primetime game shows.

== History ==
=== Early incarnations ===
Family Feud spin-offs with celebrity contestants date back to the show's original, Richard Dawson-hosted incarnation on ABC, which —from May 8, 1978, until May 25, 1984—occasionally featured primetime "All-Star Specials" played between teams of cast members from different television series (but most often fellow ABC shows).

=== NBC run ===
In March 2008, NBC announced that a spin-off of the current syndicated run of Family Feud—Celebrity Family Feud—would air during its summer lineup that year. It was promoted as part of "All-American Summer"—a slate of reality and game shows being aired by NBC in the lead-up to the 2008 Summer Olympics (including fellow FremantleMedia series America's Got Talent).

Instead of featuring the host of the syndicated version at the time, John O'Hurley (who was hosting the short-lived Secret Talents of the Stars for CBS), Celebrity Family Feud was instead hosted by Al Roker of NBC's morning show Today. This edition only lasted for one season before it was cancelled in March 2009. This edition of the show taped a total of six episodes, with the first episode airing on June 24, 2008 and the last episode airing on July 29, 2008.

=== ABC run ===
On April 9, 2015, ABC announced that it had picked up a new incarnation of Celebrity Family Feud, premiering on June 21, 2015 and hosted by Steve Harvey—the current host of the syndicated version of Family Feud. It marked the first time that any version of Family Feud aired on ABC since the end of the original version hosted by Richard Dawson in June 1985. Unlike the syndicated version of Feud, which was taped in Atlanta, Georgia from 2011 until 2017 and again since 2020, this version had been taped in Los Angeles, California from 2015 until 2024, and featured the return of Burton Richardson, who announced the syndicated version of Family Feud from 1999 to 2010, to the series. Richardson left Celebrity Family Feud in December 2023, and the show left Los Angeles, California in December 2024.

The eleventh season, which began airing in July 2024, featured Myeshia Mizuno assuming the role of showrunner, and Rubin Ervin (the current announcer of the syndicated version of Family Feud) replacing Richardson as announcer. The order for season 11 also included two The Best of Family Feud clip shows presented by Harvey—Decades of Laughs (a retrospective featuring notable moments spanning the history of the show's run), and The Best of Steve Harvey. On April 30, 2025, it was announced that the show was renewed for a twelfth season, which premiered on July 10, 2025, and it moved to Tyler Perry Studios in Atlanta, Georgia, where the syndicated version was taped there from 2024 to 2025, and the show was moved to Trilith Studios for its thirteenth season, in 2026, with the syndicated version being taped there from 2021 to 2024 and again since 2026.

In a 2026 interview, Harvey said that he originally wanted to bring Celebrity Family Feud back to NBC when the show was revived in 2015, as Harvey (at the time) was hosting his talk show, Steve Harvey, and Little Big Shots, both produced by NBC; Harvey said that he approached Paul Telegdy, an executive for NBC Entertainment, offering him the show, however, Telegdy turned down Harvey's offer, believing it would not be a good fit for the network. Harvey subsequently offered the show to ABC, which accepted it almost immediately. Harvey went on to say that Telegdy later approached Harvey to persuade him to move the show to NBC after the show proved to be a ratings success for ABC, though Harvey declined, preferring to keep the show on ABC instead. Celebrity Family Feud has remained on ABC ever since.

Under the terms of Fremantle's agreement with ABC, the network has a strict limit on how many episodes of Celebrity Family Feud it can release each season, so as not to compete against Family Feud's regular run in syndication.

From September 17 to September 22, 2025, ABC aired reruns of Celebrity Family Feud in the 11:35 pm late-night slot. The broadcasts preempted Jimmy Kimmel Live!, during its suspension due to the controversy around Jimmy Kimmel's remarks following the assassination of Charlie Kirk.

On May 8, 2026, it was announced that Celebrity Family Feud had been renewed for a thirteenth season, which premiered on July 9, 2026.

== Series overview ==
Season	Episodes	Originally released		
Season	Episodes	First released	Last released	Network
1	6	June 24, 2008	July 29, 2008	NBC
2	6	June 21, 2015	July 26, 2015	ABC
3	10	June 26, 2016	September 11, 2016	ABC
4	10	June 11, 2017	September 26, 2017	ABC
5	11	June 10, 2018	September 23, 2018	ABC
6	11	June 9, 2019	September 29, 2019	ABC
7	11	May 31, 2020	October 29, 2020	ABC
8	11	June 6, 2021	September 19, 2021	ABC
9	11	July 10, 2022	September 22, 2022	ABC
10	10	July 9, 2023	December 13, 2023	ABC
11	12	July 9, 2024	December 4, 2024	ABC
12	10	July 10, 2025	December 4, 2025	ABC
13	10	July 9, 2026	TBA	ABC

== Format ==
During the NBC run of Celebrity Family Feud, each episode featured a tournament format with three matches. The winners of the two semi-final matches played a final game, with the winner advancing to Fast Money. While the matches were still played to 300 points as usual, each match consisted of only three rounds (two single rounds and a triple round, with sudden death if needed, and no double round). The first team that reached 300 points in the final game advanced to fast money, and they earned $25,000 to the group's charity and could have their earnings doubled to $50,000 if one or both team members accrued at least 200 points in fast money. Families that lost and did not play Fast Money received $10,000 for their charity.

The ABC version does not use a tournament format and follows the same format as the syndicated version. Most episodes feature two self-contained games, each concluding with Fast Money. Some episodes in later seasons consist of a single hour-long game instead, extended with an extra round, and the game is played to 500 points instead of 300. Winning teams earn at least $10,000 and could even get upgraded to $25,000 for their chosen charity by scoring 200 points in Fast Money; teams that lose the main game earn $5,000 for their charity. In two episodes where both teams played for the same charity, Fast Money was played jointly by one member of each team.

For social distancing during the COVID-19 pandemic, the eighth and ninth seasons used a different staging, with individual podiums in a staggered layout for each team member; this also allowed some teams to have six players instead of the standard five.
