= History of MTV =

Historical timeline

Logo used since 2021.

MTV, originally an initialism of Music Television, is an American cable television channel that launched on August 1, 1981 by Warner Communications. It is currently owned by Paramount Skydance, and is one of the company's flagship brands.

MTV's original focus was on music-related programming, including blocks of music videos. As its viewership and popularity among teenagers grew, and with the eventual rise of internet-based services and platforms rendering its original format obsolete, MTV gradually scaled down its music-centric programming from the 1990s and throughout the 2000s. Reality shows and documentaries have since made the bulk of MTV's original programming, while the channel has also produced scripted comedies, adult animation, and teen dramas.

== 1981–1991: Rise of the music video ==
=== Background ===
In the 1970s, music television focused on live performances, with shows such as The Midnight Special, In Concert, and The Old Grey Whistle Test. Numerous major musical acts had made music videos to accompany their songs, including the Beatles, Bob Dylan, ABBA and Queen, but the concept and format had not been widely established.

In 1979, executives at the newly formed Warner-Amex Satellite Entertainment felt teenagers were an overlooked and potentially lucrative audience, and hoped to develop a television format to target them. MTV's original format was created by the executive Robert W. Pittman, later the president and CEO of MTV Networks. He tested the format by producing and hosting a 15-minute show, Album Tracks, on New York City's WNBC-TV in the late 1970s. Pittman's boss, Warner executive vice president John Lack, had shepherded PopClips, a TV series created by the former Monkees member Michael Nesmith, whose attention had turned to the music video format in the late 1970s. In January 1981, a series called 'Sight on Sound', the 'precursor' to MTV, was produced in Columbus.

=== Launch ===
On Saturday, August 1, 1981, at 12:01 a.m. Eastern Time, MTV was launched with the words "Ladies and gentlemen, rock and roll", spoken by John Lack and played over footage of the first Space Shuttle launch countdown (which took place earlier that year) and the launch of Apollo 11. The words were followed by the original MTV theme song, a rock tune composed by Jonathan Elias and John Petersen, playing over the U.S. flag changed to show MTV's logo changing into different textures and designs. MTV producers Alan Goodman and Fred Seibert used this public domain footage as a concept; Seibert said that they had originally planned to use Neil Armstrong's "One small step" quote, but lawyers said that Armstrong owned his name and likeness and that he had refused, so the quote was replaced with a beeping sound. A shortened version of the shuttle launch ID ran at the top of every hour in different forms, from MTV's first day until it was pulled in early 1986 in the wake of the Challenger disaster.

The first music video on MTV, which at the time was only available to homes in New Jersey, was the Buggles' "Video Killed the Radio Star". It was followed by Pat Benatar's "You Better Run". Occasionally the screen went black when an employee at MTV inserted a tape into a VCR. MTV's lower third graphics near the beginnings and ends of videos eventually used the recognizable Kabel typeface for about 25 years; but they varied on MTV's first day, set in a different typeface, and including details such as the song's year and record label. MTV's on-air programming was originally produced from the Teletronics studio facility at West 33rd Street in Manhattan, New York; programming was uplinked to satellite from a facility in Hauppauge, New York that also served as the uplink for sister networks Nickelodeon and The Movie Channel (originally, then-owner Warner-Amex Satellite Entertainment had planned to uplink MTV from a facility located at the studios of WIVB-TV in Buffalo, New York, where Nickelodeon and The Movie Channel had been uplinked; said facility was planned to be expanded to handle MTV's needs, but the deal with WIVB fell apart when Warner-Amex was unable to reach a deal with channel 4's ownership concerning a long-term lease). MTV later moved studio facilities to Unitel Video's complex located on 57th Street (ironically located across the street from the CBS Broadcast Center, owned by future corporate sibling CBS) in 1987, remaining until 1995 when MTV chose to begin producing studio content in-house.

"MTV has paved the way for a host of invaders from abroad: Def Leppard, Adam Ant, Madness, Eurythmics, the Fixx and Billy Idol, to name a few. In return, grateful Brits, even superstars like Pete Townshend and the Police, have mugged for MTV promo spots and made the phrase 'I want my MTV' a household commonplace."

— "Anglomania: The Second British Invasion", by Parke Puterbaugh for Rolling Stone, November 1983.

As programming chief, Robert W. Pittman recruited and managed a team of co-founders for the launch that included Tom Freston (who succeeded Pittman as CEO of MTV Networks), Fred Seibert and John Sykes. They were joined by Carolyn Baker (original head of talent and acquisition), Marshall Cohen (original head of research), Gail Sparrow (of talent and acquisition), Sue Steinberg (executive producer), Julian Goldberg, Steve Lawrence, Geoff Bolton; studio producers and MTV News writers/associate producers Liz Nealon, Nancy LaPook and Robin Zorn; Steve Casey (creator of the name "MTV" and its first program director), Marcy Brafman, Richard Schenkman, Ronald E. "Buzz" Brindle, and Robert Morton. Kenneth M. Miller is credited as MTV's first technical director at its New York City-based network operations facility.

Within two months, record stores were selling music from MTV that local radio stations were not playing, such as Men at Work, Bow Wow Wow and the Human League. MTV also sparked the Second British Invasion, featuring existing videos by British acts who had used the format for several years (for example, on BBC's Top of the Pops).

MTV targeted an audience of ages 12 to 34. However its self-conducted research showed that over 50% of its audience was 12–24 and that this group watched for an average of 30 minutes to two hours a day. As the PBS program Frontline explored, MTV was a driving force that catapulted music videos to a mainstream audience, turning music videos into an art form as well as a marketing machine that became beneficial to artists."

=== Original VJs and format ===
MTV's earliest format was modeled after AOR (album-oriented rock) radio. It underwent a transition to emulate a full Top 40 station in 1984. Fresh-faced young people hosted its programming and introduced videos. Many VJs became celebrities in their own right. MTV's five original VJs in 1981 were Nina Blackwood, Mark Goodman, Alan Hunter, J. J. Jackson and Martha Quinn. The VJs were hired to fit certain demographics the channel was trying to obtain: Goodman was the affable everyman; Hunter, the popular jock; Jackson, the hip radio veteran; Blackwood, the bombshell vixen; and Quinn, the girl next door. Due to uncertainty around the channel's success, the VJs were told not to buy permanent residences and to keep their second jobs.

The VJs recorded intro and outro voiceovers before broadcast, along with music news, interviews, concert dates and promotions. These segments appeared to air live and debut on MTV 24/7, but they were pre-taped within a regular work week at MTV's studios.

Rock bands and performers of the 1980s who appeared on MTV ranged from new wave to soft rock and heavy metal including Adam Ant, Bryan Adams, Pat Benatar, Blondie, the Cars, Culture Club, Def Leppard, Dire Straits (whose 1985 song and video "Money for Nothing" included the slogan "I want my MTV" in its lyrics), Duran Duran, Eurythmics, Peter Gabriel, Genesis, Daryl Hall & John Oates, Billy Idol, Michael Jackson, Billy Joel, John Mellencamp, Mötley Crüe, Tom Petty and the Heartbreakers, the Police, Prince, Ratt, Ultravox, U2, Van Halen and ZZ Top.

In 1984, more record companies and artists began making clips, realizing the popularity of MTV and the growing medium. To accommodate the influx of videos, MTV announced changes to its playlists in the November 3, 1984, issue of Billboard that took effect the next week. Playlist rotation categories were expanded from three (Light, Medium, Heavy) to seven: New, Light, Breakout, Medium, Active, Heavy and Power. This ensured that artists with chart hits got the exposure they deserved, with Medium being a home for established hits still on the climb up to the top 10; and Heavy a home for the big hits – without the bells and whistles – just the exposure they commanded.

Flashdance (1983) was the first film whose promoters supplied MTV with musical clips to compose promotional videos, which the channel included in its regular rotation.

The channel also rotated the music videos of "Weird Al" Yankovic, who made a career out of parodying other artists' videos. It also aired several of Yankovic's specials in the 1980s and 1990s, under the title Al TV.

PSAs and promotion of charitable causes and NFPs were woven into the MTV fabric. In response to the AIDS epidemic, MTV initiated a safe-sex campaign in 1985, believing that many youths would be more open to the message there than from their parents. Its safe-sex campaign continues today as "It's Your Sex Life".

=== Formatted music series ===
1986 brought the departures of three of the five original VJs, as J. J. Jackson moved back to Los Angeles and returned to radio, while Nina Blackwood moved on to pursue new roles in television. Martha Quinn's contract was not renewed in late 1986, and she departed the network. However, Quinn was brought back in early 1989 and stayed until 1992. Downtown Julie Brown was hired as a replacement VJ. In mid-1987, Alan Hunter and Mark Goodman ceased being full-time MTV veejays.

== 1991–1998: Alternative era ==
=== "Smells Like Teen Spirit" music video ===
On 10 September 1991, Nirvana released "Smells Like Teen Spirit", the lead single to their second studio album Nevermind. Its music video premiered on 29 September that year and rapidly became one of MTV's most popular and most requested videos. The video won two MTV Video Music Awards and was in heavy rotation on MTV during the 1990s. Amy Finnerty, formerly of MTV's programming department, claimed the video "changed the entire look of MTV" by giving the channel "a whole new generation to sell to". In 2000, the Guinness World Records named "Smells Like Teen Spirit" the "Most Played Video" on MTV Europe. Rolling Stone placed the music video for "Smells Like Teen Spirit" at number two on their 1993 list of "The 100 Top Music Videos". MTV ranked the song's music video at number three on its "100 Greatest Music Videos Ever Made" list in 1999.

=== Animation and reality programming ===
From 1995 to 2000, MTV played 36.5% fewer music videos. MTV president Van Toffler stated: "Clearly, the novelty of just showing music videos has worn off. It's required us to reinvent ourselves to a contemporary audience." The network launched MTV Radio Network in 1995 with Westwood One.

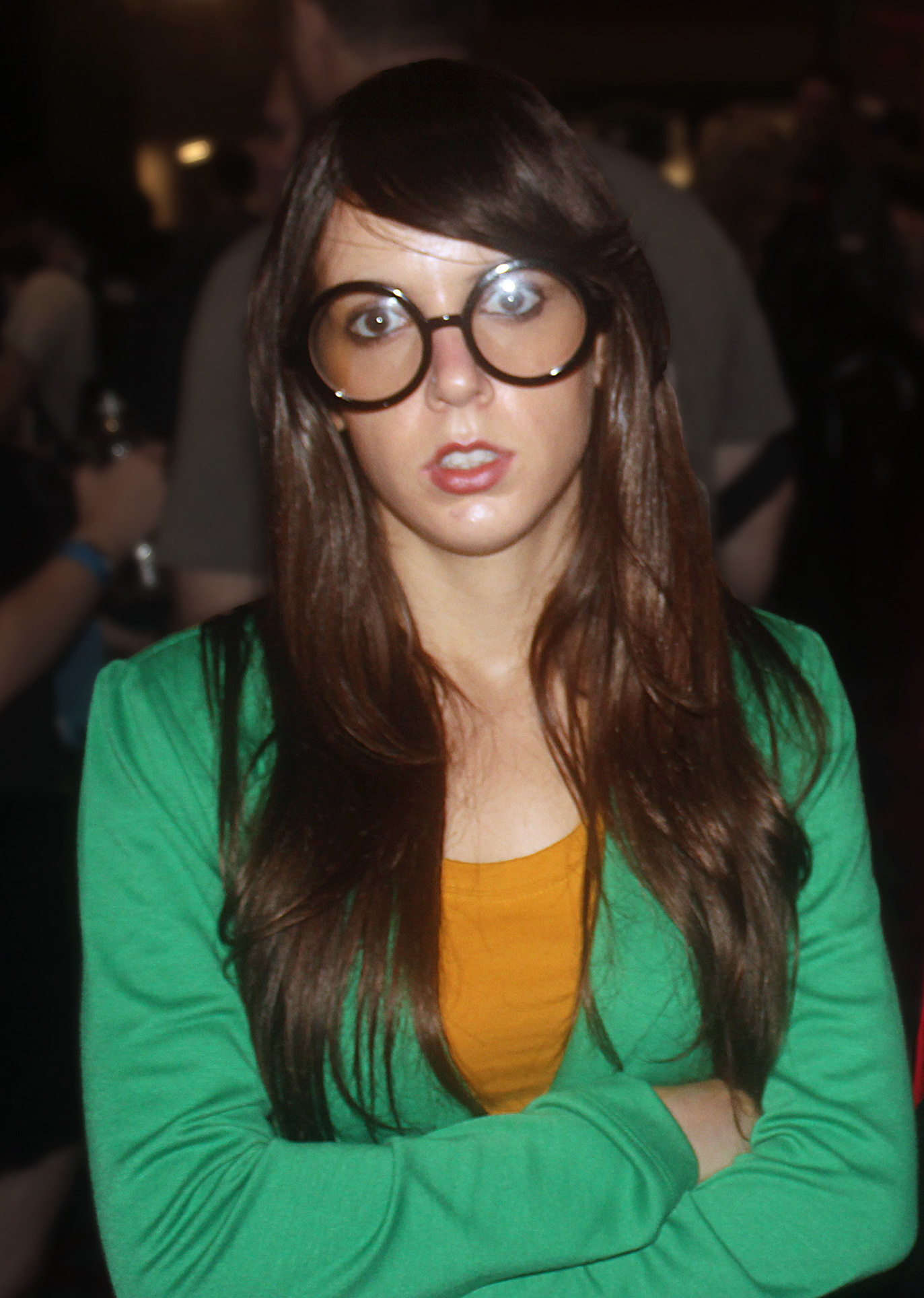
A woman cosplaying as Daria Morgendorffer, the title character of the popular MTV animated series Daria, which originally aired from March 1997 to January 2002

MTV would venture into adult animation, with shows like Beavis and Butt-Head (1993–1997), Celebrity Deathmatch (1998–2007), Undergrads (2001), Clone High (2002–2003), and Daria (1997–2002). Of the animated shows that aired, Beavis and Butt-Head and Daria ended up being the most successful, with both shows developing a cult following. Daria also included two full-length television films: Is It Fall Yet? and Is It College Yet?, which originally aired on MTV in 2000 and 2002, respectively. The 1996 Beavis and Butt-Head film Beavis and Butt-Head Do America aired on MTV in 1999 after previous objections from show creator Mike Judge.

== 1998–2008: TRL era ==
=== Total Request Live ===
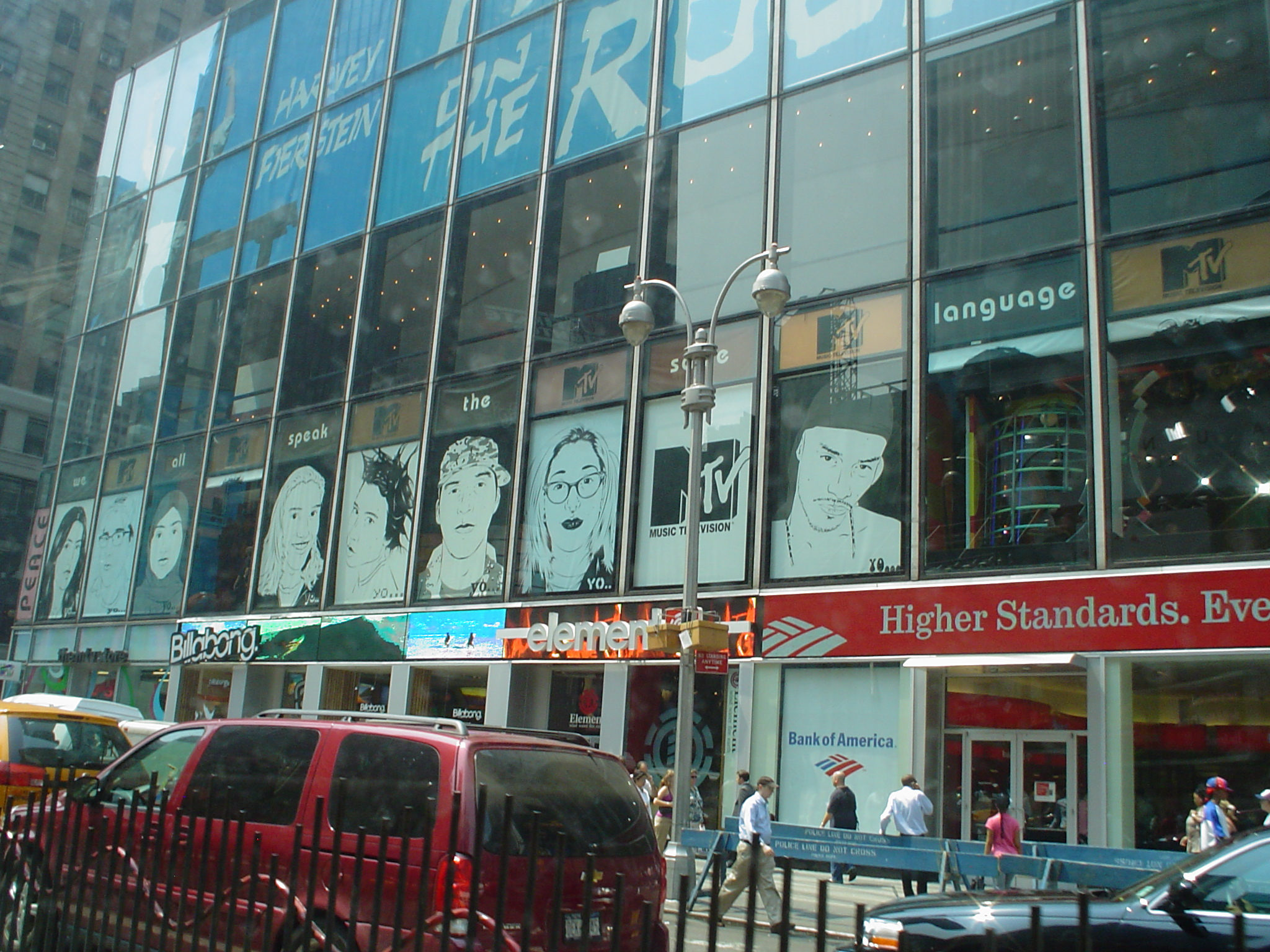
1515 Broadway in Times Square, the site of MTV Studios since 1997

In 1997, MTV introduced its new studios in Times Square. MTV created four shows in the late 1990s that centered on music videos: MTV Live, Total Request, Say What?, and 12 Angry Viewers. A year later, in 1998, MTV merged Total Request and MTV Live into a live daily top 10 countdown show, Total Request Live, which became known as TRL. The original host was Carson Daly. The show included a live studio audience and was filmed in a windowed studio that allowed crowds to look in. According to Nielsen, the average audience for the show was at its highest in 1999 and continued with strong numbers through 2001. The program played the top ten pop, rock, R&B, and hip hop music videos, and featured live interviews with artists and celebrities. In 2003, Carson Daly left MTV and TRL to focus on his late night talk show on NBC. When Daly left TRL, the show's popularity declined. The series came to an end with a special finale episode, Total Finale Live, which aired November 16, 2008, and featured hosts and guests that previously appeared on the show.

=== Return of the Rock ===
Beginning in late 1997, MTV progressively reduced its airing of rock music videos, leading to the slogan among skeptics, "Rock is dead." Two years later, in the fall of 1999, MTV announced a special Return of the Rock weekend, in which new rock acts received airtime, after which a compilation album was released.

By 2000, Linkin Park, Sum 41, Jimmy Eat World, Mudvayne, Cold, At the Drive-In, Alien Ant Farm, and other acts were added to the musical rotation. MTV also launched the subscription channel MTVX to play rock music videos exclusively.

=== Other programs ===
From 1998 to 2003, MTV also aired several other music video programs from its studios. These programs included Say What? Karaoke, a game show hosted by Dave Holmes. In the early 2000s MTV aired VJ for a Day, hosted by Ray Munns. MTV also aired Hot Zone, hosted by Ananda Lewis, which featured pop music videos during the midday time period. Other programs at the time included Sucker Free, and BeatSuite.

A 10pm programming block for top shows and specials was created at this time and called the 10 Spot. Dana Fuchs was the promo voice actor and writer for ads promoting these shows.

=== Milestones and specials ===
Around 1999 through 2001, as MTV aired fewer music videos throughout the day, it regularly aired compilation specials from its then 20-year history to look back on its roots. An all-encompassing special, MTV Uncensored, premiered in 1999 and was later released as a book.

Janet Jackson became the inaugural honoree of the "MTV Icon" award, "an annual recognition of artists who have made significant contributions to music, music video and pop culture while tremendously impacting the MTV generation." Subsequent recipients included Aerosmith, Metallica, and the Cure.

=== Expansion of reality programming ===
Over the next decade, MTV would engage in channel drift, gradually expanding its programming outside of music videos with programming lightly or heavily related to music. MTV became known for its reality programming, some of which followed the lives of musicians; The Osbournes, a reality show based on the everyday life of Black Sabbath frontman Ozzy Osbourne and his family premiered in 2002 and would become one of the network's premiere shows. It also kick-started a musical career for Kelly Osbourne, while Sharon Osbourne went on to host her own self-titled talk show on US television. Production ended on The Osbournes in November 2004. 2007's A Shot at Love with Tila Tequila, chronicling MySpace sensation Tila Tequila's journey to find a companion, was the subject of criticism due to Tequila's bisexuality. MTV also spawned the paranormal reality TV genre with the broadcast of the show Fear in 2000.

Despite targeted efforts to play certain types of music videos in limited rotation, MTV greatly reduced its overall rotation of music videos by the mid-2000s. While music videos were featured on MTV up to eight hours per day in 2000, the year 2008 saw an average of just three hours of music videos per day on MTV. It has been speculated that the rise of social media and websites like YouTube as an outlet for the promotion and viewing of music videos led to this reduction. During this time, MTV hired Nancy Bennett as Senior VP of creative and content development for MTV Networks Music. As the decade progressed, MTV video blocks would be relegated to the early morning hours. During his acceptance speech at the 2007 MTV Video Music Awards, Justin Timberlake implored MTV to "play more damn videos!" in response to these changes.

== 2008–present: Modern era ==
=== Retirement of "Music Television" name ===
In February 2010, MTV would drop the "Music Television" branding. The network would still air video premieres on occasion, through both television and real-time interaction with artists and celebrities on its website.

=== Further reality programming ===
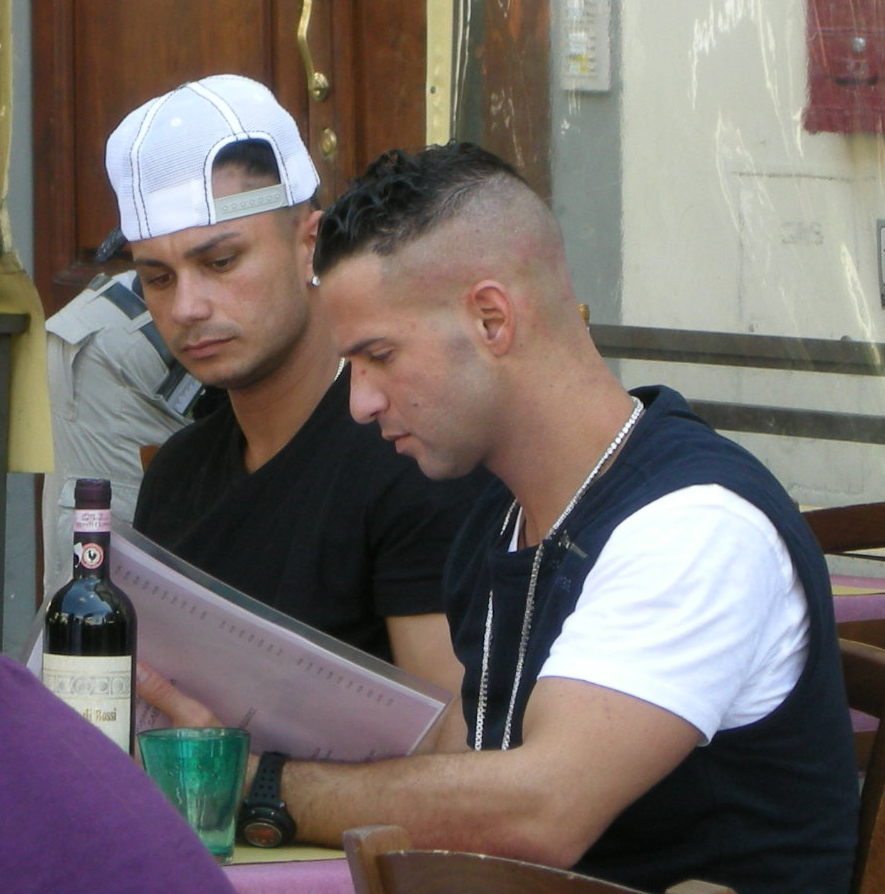
Pauly D and the Situation of Jersey Shore in 2011

2009 saw the debut of Jersey Shore, which became a ratings success throughout its run and spawned the "MTV Shores" franchise, but would attract various controversies. With backlash towards what some consider too much superficial content on the network, a 2009 New York Times article also revealed plans to shift MTV's focus towards more socially conscious media, which the article labels "MTV for the Obama era."

=== New music formats ===
AMTV, the name of MTV's music video programming since 2009

Prior to Total Request Live ending its run in 2008, MTV was experimenting with its remaining music programming under new formats. MTV first premiered a new music video programming block called FNMTV, and a weekly special event called FNMTV Premieres, hosted from Los Angeles by Pete Wentz of the band Fall Out Boy, which was designed to premiere new music videos and have viewers provide instantaneous feedback. AMTV, an early morning block, debuted in 2009. The block would rebrand as Music Feed in 2013 with a reduced schedule and, unlike FNMTV, featured many full-length music videos, news updates, interviews, and performances. MTV would continue to air music programming over the next decade, with the return of MTV Unplugged in 2009, the debut of 10 on Top in May 2010, and Hip Hop POV on April 12, 2012.

Shortly after Michael Jackson died on June 25, 2009, the channel aired several hours of Jackson's music videos, accompanied by live news specials featuring reactions from MTV personalities and other celebrities. The temporary shift in MTV's programming culminated the following week with the channel's live coverage of Jackson's memorial service. MTV aired similar one-hour live specials with music videos and news updates following the death of Whitney Houston on February 11, 2012, and the death of Adam Yauch of the Beastie Boys on May 4, 2012.

In April 2016, then-appointed MTV president Sean Atkins announced plans to restore music programming to the channel. On April 21, 2016, MTV announced that new Unplugged episodes will begin airing, as well as a new weekly performance series called Wonderland. On that same day, immediately after the death of Prince, MTV interrupted its usual programming to air Prince's music videos. In July 2017, it was announced that TRL would be returning to the network on October 2, 2017. Throughout the latter half of the 2010s, it was observed that MTV's daily schedule came to predominantly consist of film broadcasts and frequent marathons of select original programming, similar to other cable networks.

=== Ridiculousness ===
By 2020, MTV had drawn criticism from various blogs and news outlets for its over-reliance on Ridiculousness marathons. In June of that year, episodes of the series aired "for 113 hours out of the network's entire 168-hour lineup".

=== Other programs ===
Alongside its unscripted slate, MTV would produce more scripted programming. Such shows included Awkward, an American version of Skins, and a reimagining of Teen Wolf. In June 2012, the network announced the development of a television series based on the Scream franchise. As MTV would pivot back to unscripted programming towards the end of the decade, some of these shows would be moved to other networks.

Chris McCarthy was named president of MTV in 2016. In 2021, McCarthy was named president and CEO of MTV Entertainment Group (which also oversees Comedy Central, Paramount Network, TV Land, CMT, and Smithsonian Channel).

== See also ==
- List of MTV award shows
- List of MTV channels
- MTV Australia and New Zealand
- MTV Latin America
- MTV Europe
- Music industry
