= Say What =

Say What may refer to:

== Books ==
- Say What? - Talk like a local without putting your foot in it, by Lonely Planet, 2004
- Say What? by Margaret Peterson Haddix and James Bernardin 2005

== Film and TV ==
- Say What?, an MTV television series in the 1990s

== Games ==
- Say What?! (video game) Sony music game

== Music ==
- Say What! (Stevie Ray Vaughan song), a track by Stevie Ray Vaughan from the album Soul to Soul, 1985
- Say What! (Trouble Funk album), 1986 live album
- "Say What" (LL Cool J song), a song by LL Cool J
- "Say What", a song by Kovas (musician)
- "Say What", single by Jesse Winchester, 1981
