= Say What? =

- Genre: Music video
- Presented by: Matt Pinfield
- Country of origin: United States
- Original language: English
- No. of seasons: 1

Production
- Running time: 30 mins. (approx)

Original release
- Network: MTV

Related
- Say What? Karaoke

Say What? is a music video series that aired on American MTV in 1998. It was created at a time when MTV was being heavily criticized for not playing as many music videos as it had in the past. In an attempt to remedy this problem, five shows were created that centered on videos: 12 Angry Viewers, MTV Live, Artist's Cut, Total Request, and Say What?.

== Premise ==
Hosted by MTV VJ Matt Pinfield, the premise behind Say What? was to show videos with lyrics which were fast or difficult to understand. The lyrics would scroll across the bottom of the screen as the video was played. This concept would develop into Say What? Karaoke.
