= Lisa Daily =

American author and media personality

- Born: Lisa Daily; Los Angeles, California, U.S.
- Occupation: Author
- Writing career
- Notable work: Stop Getting Dumped!

Lisa Daily is an American author, columnist, and television personality. A significant focus of Daily's output is dating and relationship advice. Daily has written six books, and her articles appear on several dating and relationship websites. She is also the love and relationships expert on Daytime, a nationally syndicated morning TV show. She is also a popular media guest who has appeared on several television programs such as MTV Live to Entertainment Tonight. According to WFLA-TV, Lisa Daily has done more than 700 appearances on TV, radio and in print, more than 130 of which were on WFLA itself.

== Biography ==
Daily was born in Los Angeles, California to George Frates and Jan Donwerth. Her father owned a transportation business, and her mother was the director of a child development center. Her half brother, Todd, died in a motorcycle accident when he was 26. Her hobbies are surfing, and tightrope walking for charity. She is also active in women’s rights, education, and equality issues. She lives in Sarasota, Florida.

== Works ==
Daily writes both fiction and non-fiction. Her first book, Stop Getting Dumped! (2002) was a bestseller in both the US and UK. Her first novel, Fifteen Minutes of Shame (2008), a romantic comedy about a dating expert who finds out on national television that her husband is filing for divorce, won the Romantic Times Chick Lit Novel Award. Publishers Weekly said it delivered "surprising depth and a heroine with heart to root for".

Beauty (2012), her second novel, tells the story of a girl who wishes to be beautiful, and the next morning wakes up to find she's the most beautiful girl in Miracle, Ohio. But her wish comes with a price. The book has been translated into German, Swedish, Norwegian and Finnish languages.

== Dating expert ==
Daily has appeared as the Relationships editor on the syndicated morning show Daytime ever since Valentine’s Day, 2006. She gives advice to parents, men and women, and is consulted by various media. She has also written relationship columns for the Huffington Post, Lavalife (a Canadian dating site), and her own dating advice blog.

At her dating advice blog, Stop Getting Dumped, she frequently covers issues in more depth than she is able to cover on her segment on Daytime. In 2005 she appeared as herself on Hitch: The Dating Experts, a feature filmed for the DVD release of the film Hitch, which starred Will Smith.

== Books ==
- Stop Getting Dumped!, Plume (2002)
- Fifteen Minutes of Shame, Plume (2008)
- How To Date Like a Grown Up, Sourcebooks Casablanca (2009)
- Is He Cheating?, Siesta Key House (2012)
- Is She Cheating?, Siesta Key House (2012)
- Beauty, Razorbill (2012)
- Single-minded, St. Martin's Press (2017)
- Pop Music, ReferencePoint Press (2020)
- Cutting Edge, Siesta Key House (2023)
- Become a Famous Romance Author, Siesta Key House (2023)
- Write a Self-Help Book in 14 Days, La Vergne (2024)
- Cold Feet, Siesta Key House (2025)

== Contributions ==
Southern Fried Farce: A Buffet of Down-home Humor from the Best of Southern Writers, edited by Henry Oehmig, Jefferson Press (2007) (contributed essay)
