= AMTV =

Television programming block on MTV

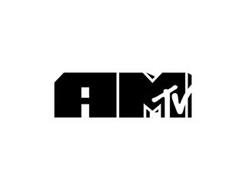
- Genre: General programming
- Country of origin: United States
- Original language: English

Production
- Running time: 8 hours

Original release
- Network: MTV
- Release: March 30, 2009

AMTV's former logo from 2009.

AMTV (formerly known as Music Feed, sometimes known as AMTV's Music Feed) is a television programming block on MTV in the United States that first aired unofficially as a sneak preview on March 26, 2009, and launched officially on March 30, 2009. It was originally the network's primary source of music video programming, but is now a general programming block. AMTV and AMTV2 were removed from MTV's lineup in 2017, but the AMTV logo remains in use during early morning general programming. For ratings purposes, the block is marketed as a separate network from MTV.

== History ==
=== As Music Feed (2009–2017) ===
==== Background ====
AMTV signaled the newest return of music programming on MTV. The channel had gone without any music video programming during the first few months of 2009, after it ceased broadcasting FNMTV, a similar Friday night themed block that composed of short clips of music videos. The cancellation of MTV's flagship music program, Total Request Live, in November 2008 was also seen as the end of an era for MTV, leading critics to insist MTV's music brand is "irrelevant" and to conclude that the Internet has replaced television as the preferred medium for watching music videos.

==== Format overview ====
AMTV initially combined music videos with news updates, interviews, and live music performances. It featured many full-length music videos, including some older videos, in a segment called "Throwback". During the program, the channel promoted related features on its music-based web site, MTVMusic.com.

MTV resurrected its Unplugged series by airing individual acoustic performances during prime time hours, then placing the full episode on MTV.com and also playing many of the performances during AMTV over the next few days. MTV has also referred to the program as a "laboratory for advertising partnerships," meaning that an individual company could be the sole sponsor of the program on specific mornings, inserting its brand into the program in ways other than traditional TV commercials.

As of August 18, 2009, AMTV began airing weather. At some point, AMTV added a top 10 countdown that started to air in the 8 a.m. ET hour. The countdown ceased sometime in December 2009 but returned in its new 7 a.m. ET time slot on January 6, 2010.

AMTV's schedule changed a number of times throughout 2012 and more recently ended at 8 a.m. ET and excluded Monday airings. From April 16, 2012, the Monday block returned and videos went to 9 a.m. ET again.

The 8 a.m. ET hour continued to come and go since April 2012, but notably (since sometime in 2011) were the main stay playlists that made up AMTV. These playlists were the most common on AMTV and each lasted an hour without any specific order in which they aired: Clubland, Fiercest Females, Killer Collaborations, Sucker Free Playlist, Morning Jams, Wake & Shake. Specialty playlists appeared from time to time to support upcoming programming such as new programming and upcoming award shows.

As of January 2013, the order of programming on AMTV was as follows: 3 a.m. ET Clubland, 4 a.m. Rise & Grind, 5 a.m. Killer Collaborations, 6 a.m. MTV Jams, 7 & 8 a.m., Wake & Shake. The 8 a.m. ET hour of the block also aired specialty playlists on occasion.

MTV changed the airtime and length of AMTV frequently as 2013 progressed, announced only through their schedule. Airing of AMTV began to exclude Mondays and Tuesdays at this point, and as of September 16, 2013, all AMTV blocks were now sub-titled as "Buzzworthy".

Starting in late September 2013, all playlists were scheduled as "Music Feed", though the AMTV logo was still present in the block's graphics; Clubland became the only remaining separately-branded playlist.

On December 5, 2016, Music Feed went on a hiatus which lasted until March 7, 2017. Following its return, the program saw a major readjustment as the running time was decreased to only one hour. During this time, Music Feed aired in an early morning timeslot Tuesday through Friday, alternating between 4:00 and 5:00 a.m. ET each day. This format lasted until April 21, 2017, when Music Feed was ultimately removed from MTV's morning lineup.

Since the cancellation of AMTV as a programming block, the AMTV logo remains as an on-screen bug for all MTV programming airing between 3 a.m. and 11 a.m. ET/PT; as of late May 2020, music programming remained on the network through Fresh Out Live, an eight-minute interstitial which aired on Fridays at 5 p.m. ET/PT, and the program Fresh Out Playlist, which began on February 8, 2020, and aired on Saturday mornings at 8 a.m. ET/PT; the AMTV bug could be seen during Fresh Out Playlist due to its timeslot. Currently, scheduled music video programming on MTV is limited to one hour per week: Mondays at 3 a.m.

==== Programming blocks ====
- Clubland
- Fiercest Females
- Killer Collaborations
- Morning Jams
- MTV Jams
- Music Feed
- New Music Monday
- Rise & Grind
- Sucker Free Playlist
- Throwback Thursday
- Wake & Shake
- Woman Crush Wednesday

== AMTV2 ==
AMTV
- Also known as: MTV2 Music Mix
- Genre: Music Videos
- Country of origin: United States
- Original language: English

Production
- Running time: 5 hours

Original release
- Network: MTV2
- Release: 2009 – November 6, 2017

Sister network MTV2 debuted a similar program known as "AMTV2". AMTV2 first ran from 3 a.m. – 9 a.m. Mondays - Thursdays. In the 8 a.m. hour, AMTV2 previously ran a top 10 countdown much like AMTV does in the 7 a.m. hour. These videos were limited to hip hop and rock genres.

As of March 16, 2010, encore episodes of Sucker Free Daily aired at 8:30 a.m. ET/PT, ending the top 10 countdown for that week. The top 10 has not returned in the final hour (8 a.m. ET/PT) after Sucker Free Daily was moved to 7:30 a.m. ET/PT.

As of the week of January 17, 2011, AMTV2 ended at 7:30 a.m. ET/PT and no longer resumed at 8 a.m. ET/PT after Sucker Free Daily. The 8 a.m. hour was sometimes used to air music specials such as Unplugged, World Stage, or other music related series.

At some point in early 2011, AMTV2's graphics changed to reflect the new name Morning Music Buzz, though the AMTV2 graphic "bug" remains on the screen.

On February 12, 2012, AMTV2 aired Sunday from 8 a.m. – 9 a.m., its only weekend airing. The hour block was dedicated to Whitney Houston videos, which came a day after the news broke of her sudden death. Earlier in the morning on February 12, 2012, from 2 a.m. – 3 a.m. ET, an hour-long music block of Whitney Houston videos aired as well, which cut into the first hour of a re-airing of the film Bride of Chucky.

During its final years of broadcast, AMTV2 aired on weekday mornings from 4 a.m. – 9 a.m. ET/PT. AMTV2 was removed from MTV2's morning lineup on November 6, 2017. The last music video to be aired on AMTV2 was "Feelings" by Hayley Kiyoko.

== See also ==
- List of programs broadcast by MTV
