= Ananda Lewis =

American broadcast journalist, television host and social activist (1973–2025)

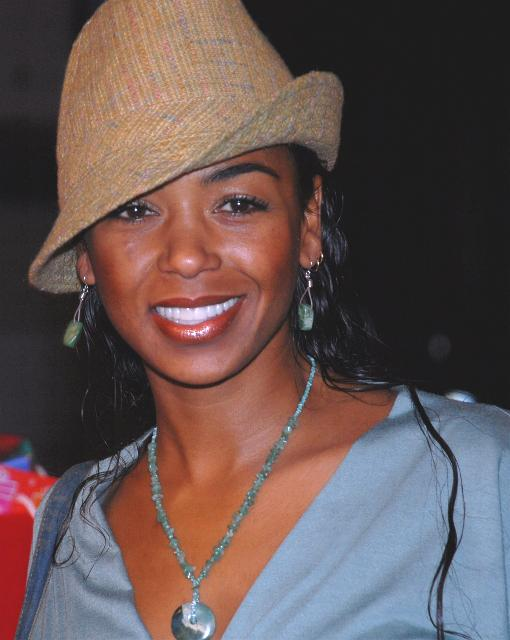
- Lewis in 2007
- Born: Sarasvati Ananda Lewis; March 21, 1973; Los Angeles, California, U.S.
- Died: June 11, 2025 (aged 52); Los Angeles, California, U.S.
- Education: Howard University; L.A. Trade–Tech
- Occupations: Broadcast journalist; social activist; model; carpenter
- Years active: 1993–2025
- Children: 1

Sarasvati Ananda Lewis (March 21, 1973 – June 11, 2025) was an American broadcast journalist, veejay and carpenter. She was a two-time NAACP Image Award recipient. Lewis was a cultural role model and staple television personality for BET and MTV during the late 1990s. She hosted BET's Teen Summit and served as a MTV VJ as well as hosting the network's show Hot Zone as well as occasionally hosting and frequently co-hosting Total Request Live. Lewis hosted The Ananda Lewis Show, a nationally syndicated American television talk show that ran for two seasons. The show reported on serious subjects in contrast to more sensationalized contemporary talk shows such as the Ricki Lake Show and the Jerry Springer Show. After a break from television, she became a correspondent for The Insider. Lewis returned to television in 2019 to host the revival of While You Were Out on TLC.

In October 2020, Lewis announced that she had been battling stage 3 breast cancer for the previous two years. In an October 2024 interview with Good Morning America, Lewis said she wanted people to remember "that I loved hard, and lived loud and didn’t back away from problems. And loved this life and was OK with letting it go too." Lewis died while in hospice care at her Los Angeles home on June 11, 2025, at the age of 52, seven years after her cancer diagnosis.

== Early life and education ==
The second-born daughter of Yvonne Lewis, an account manager for Pacific Bell, and Stanley Lewis, a computer-animation specialist, Sarasvati Ananda Lewis was born on March 21, 1973, in Los Angeles, California. By the time she was two years old, the Lewises' marriage ended in divorce and she and her sister, Lakshmi, were relocated by their mother to live with their grandmother in San Diego. To escape the pain of her failed marriage, her mother then took an extended trip to Europe—leaving Ananda and Lakshmi with their grandmother for about a year. Lewis felt abandoned saying, "It was like she nurtured me and carried me in her womb and then completely left." Lewis often fought with her mother while growing up and rarely saw her father, who remarried. Lewis and her grandmother also frequently "locked horns" while she was growing up.

In 1981, at eight years old, she entered herself in the Little Miss San Diego Contest, a beauty pageant, and won. During the talent portion of the competition, Lewis performed a dance routine, which she had choreographed herself, to Stevie Wonder and Paul McCartney's ballad "Ebony and Ivory". After her win, Lewis attracted the attention of a talent agent and began working in local theater productions and on television. In fourth grade, she enrolled at the San Diego School of Creative and Performance Arts (SCPA), a public magnet school, where she remained for nine years. She studied theater, vocal music, photography, and dance from the fourth grade through high school.

She majored in history at Howard University in Washington, D.C., from which she graduated cum laude in 1995.

== Career ==
=== Early career ===
While a student at Howard University in 1993, Lewis was featured prominently in the hit R&B music video by fellow HU alumni Shai, "Baby, I'm Yours", filmed on campus.

During college Lewis had volunteered as a mentor with at risk youth. She was considering attending graduate school but her pupils encouraged her to audition for BET's Teen Summit.

Lewis's audition was successful and she became the host of Teen Summit. For three seasons she discussed serious issues affecting teenagers. In 1996, on an installment of the show entitled It Takes a Village, Lewis interviewed then-First Lady Hillary Clinton, whose book with that title had been published earlier in the year. Also in 1996, Teen Summit was nominated for a CableACE Award, and the next year the National Association for the Advancement of Colored People (NAACP) presented Lewis with an Image Award for her work on Black Entertainment Television (BET). Soon afterward the cable network MTV offered Lewis a position as a program host and video jockey. The thought of leaving Teen Summit was painful for her; indeed, several sources quoted her as recalling that she "cried for three weeks" while pondering her choices. In opting to move to MTV, the deciding factor was the possibility of greatly increasing the size of her viewing audience and the potential for influencing America's youth.

Lewis hosted and VJed a variety of shows. She began as one of the hosts of MTV Live alongside Carson Daly and Toby Amies, the initial flagship show of the network's new era from its Times Square studios, and briefly hosted 12 Angry Viewers. MTV Live merged with Total Request to become Total Request Live, a daily top ten video-countdown show where she was a frequent co-host and occasional main host. She also hosted Hot Zone, which offered both music videos and Lewis's interviews of musicians and others, and occasionally MTV Jams. On a notable installment of Hot Zone, she berated the rapper Q-Tip about the number of scantily clad dancers in one of his videos, which she regretted not handling with more nuance. In a reference to Lewis's broadcasting savvy, Bob Kusbit, MTV's senior vice president for production, told Douglas Century for The New York Times on November 21, 1999, "In the past our talent was sometimes just pretty people who could read cue cards. But when we brought Ananda to MTV, we decided we were going to do a lot more live television." MTV also called upon Lewis to host other topical programs including two MTV forums on violence in schools, which aired after the Columbine High School massacre and several memorial tributes for the singer Aaliyah, who died in a plane crash in 2001. In 2001, Lewis earned another NAACP Image Award, for her hosting of the MTV special True Life: I Am Driving While Black.

In 1998, while at MTV, Lewis made headlines when she announced that she intended to remain abstinent for at least six months. She said:

I made the decision for selfish reasons, but I'm going public here because I realized I might be able to help other girls, too. I know the kind of drama that being sexually active brings to your life. I felt that if it was good for me to take a break, it might be good for other young girls, too. You see, I think I would be a whole different person if I hadn't had sex so early. Everybody was saying, "Do it!" but nobody ever said, "You don't have to do it". I think hearing that would have made a huge difference in my life.

Lewis became a familiar presence at celebrity-attended events in and around New York City with Douglas Century of The New York Times stating: "In the last year, Ms. Lewis has emerged as the hip-hop generation's reigning 'It Girl,' meaning she is not just an MTV personality but a woman whose looks and attitudes have made her perpetually in demand."

=== Later career ===
In 2000, People included Lewis on its list of the worlds' "50 Most Beautiful People". In 2001, Lewis decided to leave MTV in order to start her own talk show. The Ananda Lewis Show debuted on September 10, 2001, after much advance press in which Lewis was compared to Oprah Winfrey. Lewis continued to do special presentations for MTV after her show had begun. Lewis's series which was syndicated by King World Productions, targeted women between the ages of eighteen and thirty-four by addressing such issues as domestic violence and breast cancer; it was billed as an alternative to the sensationalism and provocative offerings of Jerry Springer and Ricki Lake, whose talk shows were then dominating daytime ratings. Lewis's show aired on some WB and NBC stations before being canceled after about 250 episodes. Lewis later expressed regret for doing the show, reflecting that she felt she was not ready to handle the responsibility of a full-time hosting role.

In 2004, Lewis became the chief correspondent on celebrity subjects for the nationally syndicated, nightly entertainment program The Insider, a spin-off of the popular Entertainment Tonight.

Also in 2004, Lewis also appeared on the ABC network's reality show called Celebrity Mole: Yucatán. This reality series won an Emmy for Outstanding Achievement for Enhanced Television. An avid animal lover, Lewis served as co-host of the A&E television-network show America's Top Dog and as a spokesperson for the Humane Society. She was known to frequently introduce her two pet chihuahuas to interviewers. She was also a spokesperson for Reading Is Fundamental, a nonprofit literacy group.

According to IMDb, Lewis also served as an actress and producer, known for On the Line (2001), Nora's Hair Salon II (2008) and Method & Red (2004).

== Illness and death ==
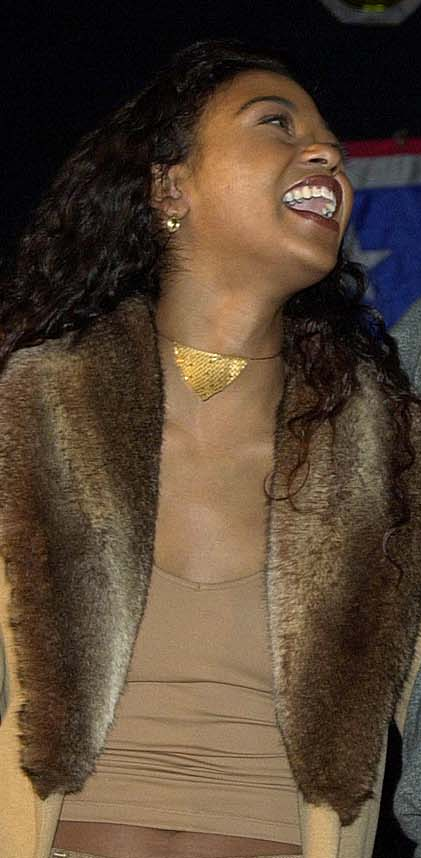
Lewis in 2000

On October 2, 2020, Lewis announced that she had been diagnosed in 2019 with stage III breast cancer after she conducted a self-exam. In her announcement at the time, she encouraged her followers to be up to date on their mammograms after revealing that she had not gotten hers leading up to her diagnosis. "I need you to share this with the women in your life who may be as stubborn as I was about mammograms and I need you to tell them that they have to do it," Lewis said in her announcement. "Early detection, especially for breast cancer, changes your outcome. It can save [your] life."

On October 15, 2024, she announced that her cancer had progressed to stage IV after six years. Around that time, she sat down with CNN correspondents Stephanie Elam and Sara Sidner—who in 2024 were also diagnosed with breast cancer—to discuss their health journeys.

During their conversation, Lewis opened up to Sidner and Elam, whom Lewis met during her first year at Howard University and whom she counted as a best friend, about the course of treatment she chose. Although Lewis had refused to undergo a physician-recommended double mastectomy, she expressed her ultimate regret over not having earlier consented to the mastectomy her doctors recommended.

In January 2025, Essence published an article stressing that "prevention is the real cure" by Lewis. "I also couldn't figure out how to fit the double mastectomy, the full chemotherapy and, potentially, the radiation they were telling me to have into my already overwhelmed life," Lewis noted in a timeline of her breast cancer management. "All while managing the major stress of ending a 10-year relationship with the man I loved—my son’s father," Lewis wrote of the treatment-seeking relocations between California and Arizona that she embarked upon, which also included a trip to see "an American doctor in Mexico." Lewis's open letter addressed the financial and emotional challenges she faced, her healthcare insurance woes, the effect of the COVID-19 pandemic on her treatment, and her views on quality of life among other topics:

"Going into 2025, I would say to women: Do everything in your power to avoid my story becoming yours. If I had known what I know now 10 years ago, perhaps I wouldn’t have ended up here. I would have been cold plunging, exercising consistently, making sure my vitamin D levels were good, detoxing my body on a monthly and yearly basis, and sleeping better. I would’ve been doing all the things I’ve been forced to do now, to keep my body from creating more cancer and remove what it has already made."

Lewis died, surrounded by family, in hospice care at her home in Los Angeles, on June 11, 2025, at the age of 52.

== Awards and nominations ==
Year	Award	Category	Work	Result
1996	CableACE Award	Children's Educational or Informational Special or Series	Teen Summit − "Living on the Street . . . On the Real"	Nominated
1997	NAACP Image Award	Outstanding Youth Series	Teen Summit − "It Takes a Village"	Won
2000	NAACP Image Award	Outstanding News, Talk or Information – Special	True Life − "I Am Driving While Black"	Won
