= Say What? Karaoke =

American television series

- Also known as: SWK; SWK 2.0
- Genre: Game show
- Written by: Tom Cohen; Matthew C. Mills
- Directed by: Joe DeMaio; Steve Paley; Liz Patrick
- Presented by: Dave Holmes (1998–2000); Laura Lifshitz (co-host) (1998–2000); Teck Holmes; Joey McIntyre (2001); Danielle Fishel & Steven Hill (2003)
- Country of origin: United States
- Original language: English

Production
- Executive producers: Tony DiSanto; Bob Kusbit
- Producer: Jennifer J. Carr
- Running time: 30 minutes

Original release
- Network: MTV
- Release: May 25, 1998 – July 1, 2003

Related
- Say What?; SWK 2.0

Say What? Karaoke (also known as SWK, and later SWK 2.0) is a karaoke game show that aired on the American cable television network MTV. The game show is a spinoff of the former MTV show Say What?.

== Synopsis ==
The basics of the show are formatted as a real karaoke machine. Various college contestants compete by singing a popular song (often a pop song) with the music video played at the same time, as well as lyrics playing at the bottom of the screen. At times, there are two contestants that compete together. Afterwards they are rated by the judges on a 1-10 with plastic number signs, the rating number is also the number of points they have earned. Similar to other competitions, the finalists end up in first, second, and third position which depends on the number of points they have earned.

The show began as a special that was extrapolated from the current MTV show Say What?. The original specials were tongue-in-cheek; the hosts even admitted that they thought karaoke was a lame premise for a show. However, the concept turned out to be extremely popular, more so than the show it had originated from.

At different times, the series was hosted by television personality and actor Dave Holmes, Real World alum Teck Holmes, singer Joey McIntyre, and finally co-hosted by actress Danielle Fishel and Real World alum Steven Hill. The series also featured several celebrity guest judges including actor Shia LaBeouf and singers Ashlee Simpson and Trevor Penick.

=== SWK 2.0 ===
After the series ended in July 2003, its premise was revamped and aired on MTV on May 12, 2007 with the new title SWK 2.0. The show was hosted by Mikey Day and also featured celebrity judges including Danity Kane singer Aubrey O'Day, American Idol contestant Paris Bennett, and reality show star Tiffany "New York" Pollard, as well as viewer voting in some elements.
