= 12 Angry Viewers =

- Genre: Reality television Music video
- Created by: Andy Schuon
- Directed by: Steve Paley
- Presented by: Jancee Dunn (1997); Ananda Lewis (1997–1998)

Production
- Producer: Adam Freeman
- Running time: approx. 22 minutes

Original release
- Network: MTV
- Release: September 22, 1997 – 1998

12 Angry Viewers is an American daily half-hour television show that aired on MTV from 1997 to 1998. In it, a public jury judges music videos. The title is a play on the title of the 1957 jury-deliberation film 12 Angry Men and its 1997 TV remake, which aired a month before this show's premiere. The show's first host was Jancee Dunn, with Ananda Lewis replacing her later on.

== Premise ==
The "12 Angry Viewers" were selected from 18 to 24-year-old MTV viewers who auditioned at MTV's studios in New York City. Through the course of a week they would watch several "brand new" videos and select a finalist at the end of each episode. On Friday a winner was selected from among the four finalists and put into "heavy rotation" on the network. In actuality the 12 viewers filmed five episodes over the course of one day, after being selected from a group of walk-in auditioners who did a "test viewing" in an observed room. Some auditions were held on campuses or locations for special events such as spring break. The format of the show was tweaked for several events, such as 12 Angry Spring Breakers, in which the hottest male/female video star was selected, and 12 Angry VJs, which aired during 1998's Wanna Be a VJ and featured 12 former VJs. The show's final episodes were taped in Seaside Heights, New Jersey as part of MTV's Summer Share.

There were also shows in which the viewer decided which video would get "banned" from being played on MTV. The first video so chosen was Gina G's 1996 video "Ooh Aah... Just a Little Bit" in 1998. However, this video had only been played on select shows such as The Grind and never saw a lot of rotation on the channel.

== History ==
The show was created during MTV's programming overhaul in 1997, which was partially in response to criticism for playing fewer music videos as it had in the past. It was originally considered for development as a segment of MTV Live.

MTV Russia had a version of 12 Angry Viewers called 12 злобных зрителей which started in 1999 sporadically until present with several different styles and hosts. Some season were "in which intellectuals and others debate music videos."

== Reviews ==
In 2013, Louis Virtel wrote for NewNowNext that the show was #7 of MTV's 10 Most Underrated Series where members "fought over which clips ruled the roost" and "see fabulous vids by Bjork, Portishead, or Daft Punk." In 2015, James Sheldon wrote for Fame10 placing it at #9 on Worst MTV Produced Shows because, "The viewers were coached to be outspoken, controversial if necessary and highly energetic. This made the show insufferable."

== Videos that won 12 Angry Viewers ==
- Propellerheads – "History Repeating"
- Portishead – "Only You"
- Aphex Twin – "Come to Daddy"
- Björk – "Bachelorette"
- Fretblanket – "Into The Ocean"
- Daft Punk – "Around the World"
- Jason Nevins VS. Run DMC "It's Like That" (scored 59 out of 60)
- Lusk "Backworlds"
- Def Squad "Rapper's Delight"
- Royal Crown Revue – "Barflies at the Beach"
- Robert Bradley's Blackwater Surprise – "Once Upon A Time"
