= Total Request =

- Presented by: Carson Daly
- Country of origin: United States
- Original language: English

Production
- Running time: 30-60 minutes

Original release
- Network: MTV
- Release: April 6, 1998 – September 1998

Total Request is an American music video request show on MTV.

== Background ==
The show debuted in April 1998 as part of a renewed effort by MTV to increase the amount of music programming aired on the network. The show originally debuted as a 30-minute program aired as part of a weeknight programming block that also included Artist's Cut, Say What?, and Rockumentary Remix. Carson Daly served as the host. By May, the show had been expanded to an hour, replacing Rockumentary Remix. Each episode consisted of counting down the day's top music video requests received by MTV via phone, email, and a camera set up in Times Square. While the show was based at MTV's studio in Times Square, it was also filmed in Seaside Heights, New Jersey as part of MTV's Summer Share from May through August 1998. The show last aired in September 1998 and was then merged with MTV Live to form Total Request Live.
