= FNMTV =

- Presented by: Pete Wentz
- Country of origin: United States
- No. of seasons: 2

Production
- Running time: 60 min.

Original release
- Network: MTV
- Release: June 13 – December 5, 2008

FNMTV (officially Feedback New MTV; informally Friday Night MTV) is a music video program on MTV focused on premiering new music videos and airing viewers' instantaneous feedback from its website. F N was branded to stand for "Friday Night" to signify when the premiere block airs.

The Friday night premiere block, FNMTV Premieres, taped at Ren-Mar Studios in Hollywood, was hosted by Pete Wentz and aired in encore for the remainder of the week. Music video blocks with viewer feedback and artist commentary aired weekdays 8 to 11:00 AM ET/PT and Tuesday through Friday at 4:00 PM – 5:00 PM ET/PT on MTV.

A new early morning block of the same name was introduced alongside FNMTV. It was composed of abbreviated clips of music videos, approximately 60 seconds each.

MTV confirmed that a new season would air December 5, 2008 following the ending of TRL, but the new "season" consisted of one holiday themed episode. An unrelated Spring Break 90 minute special of the same name aired Friday, March 27, 2009.

The early morning block ended in January 2009, leaving the channel virtually devoid of music related programming for more than two months, until the introduction of AMTV.
