= Say What?! (video game) =

2011 mobile video game

- Developer: 8linQ
- Platform: iOS
- Release: August 10, 2011
- Genre: Music game
- Mode: Single-player

Say What?! is a music game application that involves tapping icons on a scrolling conveyor belt to match words from song lyrics, while the songs play. The initial download of this application is available for free via the App Store, with four included tracks: one from a big Sony Music artist, and three from emerging acts signed to Music In Colour. Tracks from Sony are sold via in-app payments of £1.49 per song. The game launched on August 10, 2011 with a free track from Calvin Harris and also features songs from a diverse range of artists including Kasabian, The Zutons, Scouting for Girls, The Hoosiers, Toploader and The Nolans, with new tracks being added weekly. The game also launched with songs from three brand new artists from new record label, Music In Colour.; Gudny, Mercston and Gus Warriner.

== Gameplay ==
The game uses a scrolling collection of icons, which relate to individual highlighted words within the lyrics to the current song, which are displayed above. If the word 'I' is highlighted, the player might have to tap on an eye icon, for example, while 'down' might be the cue to tap on a downward-facing arrow. At higher difficulty levels, the clues get more cryptic. Users can also challenge their friends, other fans and the artists themselves.

== Development and History ==
Say What?! was developed by interactive music company 8linQ, whose aim is to change the way people consume music, by making music interactive, engaging, challenging, social and competitive, which they believe will also help reduce the incidence of piracy. 8linQ is a joint venture between production company Music In Colour. (the ex DJ Hero team Ofei Sakyi and Chris Lee), mobile firm Reactify and recording studio firm Metropolis Group. Sony Music Entertainment has signed a 6‐month exclusive deal to provide tracks to the game including the Calvin Harris hit Ready For The Weekend, which will be free to download at launch.

== Impact on the Music Industry ==
Behind the fun exterior, Say What?! also produces powerful real time data for the music industry, including how many consumers buy an artists’ track, how often they play the track, when they play the track and where in the game players stop playing. Each download of the track counts towards the digital download charts and so can be used to launch new artists and re‐launch catalogue tracks.

Say What?! is an effective new distribution platform, which also provides powerful real‐time analytics data on consumers and their music habits. It taps into the social gaming phenomenon and provides a new revenue stream for digital music with each downloaded track chart eligible On launch, the game will be cross‐promoted to 20 million users via the Future Games Network.

According to Chris Lee, Joint MD of 8linq, "The data produced can tell a label what consumers are buying in real time, providing instant feedback on what tracks and artists are popular – we can have a new track available to buy in the store within 24 hours of receiving clearances. It can put new artists in front of music fans, provide a platform for established artists’ new music and reinvigorate catalogue tracks. It's going to be exciting to see how powerful games can become for music on these platforms."
