= MTVX =

Defunct digital cable hard rock music channel

- Country: United States

Ownership
- Owner: MTV Networks (Viacom)

History
- Launched: August 1, 1998
- Closed: May 1, 2002
- Replaced by: MTV/BET Jams

MTVX was an American hard rock music video channel operated by Viacom's MTV Networks division. A sister channel of MTV, MTVX was available exclusively on digital cable providers, being the first network to be made available as part of the "MTV Networks Digital Suite".

== Format ==
MTVX aired no advertising outside of MTV2 promos, airing videos on a daily loop programmed to air in three eight-hour blocks per day. The channel aired contemporary videos and older videos that were no longer shown on MTV. Likewise, MTVX was not limited to just one genre of rock music videos. The channel aired a variety of genres, including punk, heavy metal, and nu metal, among many others.

MTVX showcased otherwise unknown or unheard music to the masses, such as Static-X, Disturbed, Finger Eleven, Black Label Society, SOiL, Soulfly, Sepultura, Tool, Pantera, Kittie, Dope, Coal Chamber, Primus, Mushroomhead and others.

== Closure ==
MTVX ended on May 1, 2002, and was replaced by MTV Jams, a hip hop music video channel. The last video played on MTVX was "See You On The Other Side" by Ozzy Osbourne. The replacement of MTVX was decried by rock music fans. MTV's explanation, based upon ratings and Billboard chart information, was that viewers wanted a devoted network for hip hop and R&B videos, rather than the alternative rock and hard rock videos that MTVX had been created to play, and claims that hard rock formats went into a quick decline post-9/11 due to industry and radio de-emphasis.

== Reuse of brand ==
In 2011 MTV began reusing the MTVX brand (with X standing here for 'extended') for "a new cross-media group in charge of developing content for various platforms such as TV, computers and mobile phones." MTV launched MTVX in August The effort never resulted in any actual product or program branded by MTVX, though the brand name of MTVX remained present on MTV's official corporate page for several years.
