= Carson Daly =

American television and radio personality and producer (born 1973)

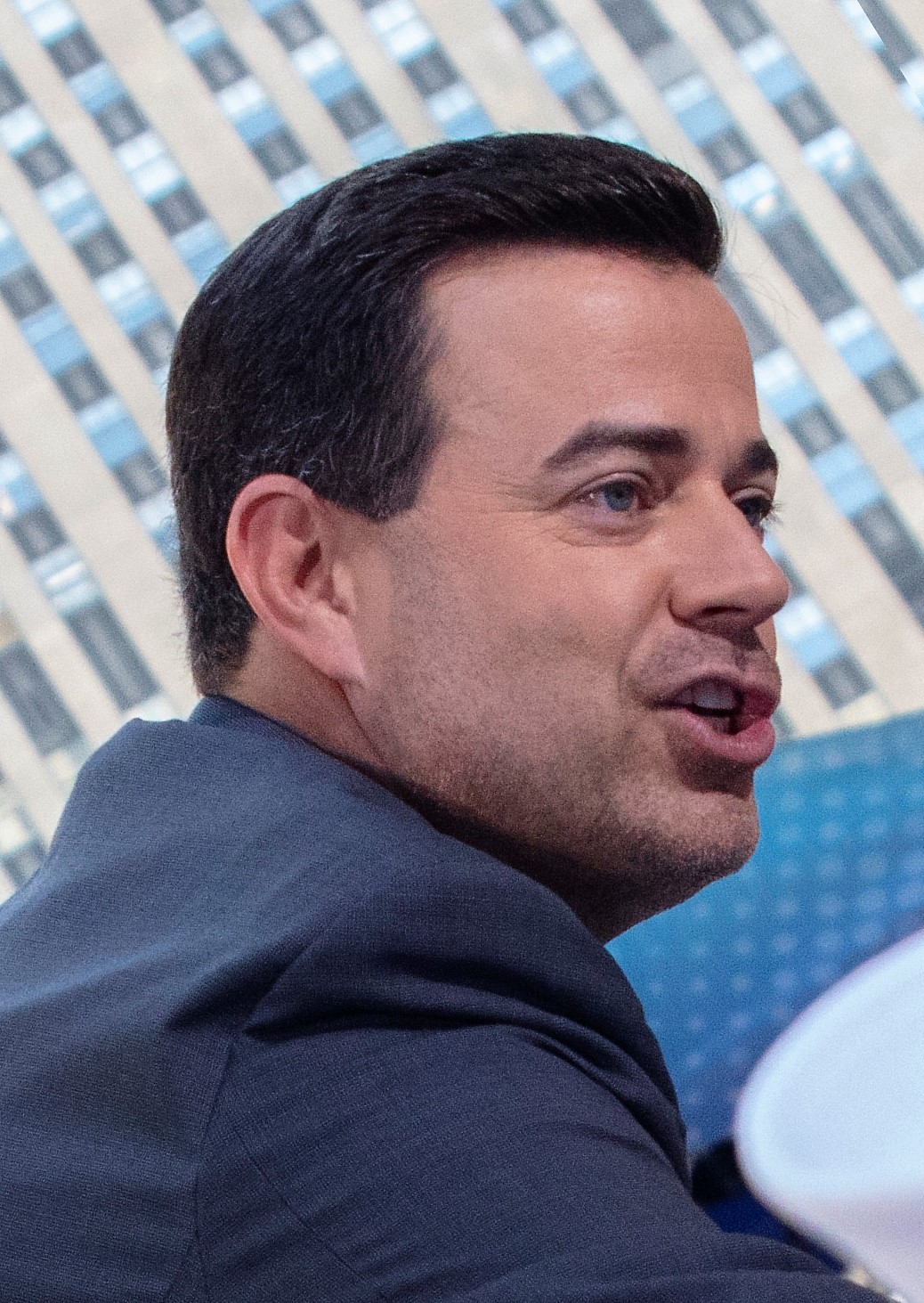
- Daly in 2018
- Born: Carson Jones Daly; June 22, 1973 (age 53); Santa Monica, California, U.S.
- Occupations: Talk show host; radio personality; television personality
- Years active: 1991–present
- Spouse: Siri Pinter (m. 2015)
- Children: 4

Carson Jones Daly (born June 22, 1973) is an American television host, radio personality, producer, and television personality. From 1998 to 2003, with occasional appearances in 2004, Daly was the primary VJ on MTV's Total Request Live (TRL), and a DJ for the Southern California-based radio station 106.7 KROQ-FM. In 2002, Daly joined NBC, where he hosted and produced the late-night talk show Last Call with Carson Daly, and occasionally hosting special event programming for NBC, such as the Macy's 4th of July Fireworks show, and executive producing New Year's Eve with Carson Daly from Times Square beginning in 2003.

Daly has since been involved in more prominent roles at NBC, such as becoming host for its reality music competition The Voice in 2011 and joining NBC's morning show Today as a social media correspondent in 2013, with his role increasing in subsequent years becoming a co-host.

Daly has also worked as a radio DJ. He was a nighttime host on the Los Angeles radio station KROQ-FM and beginning in 2010, began hosting Mornings with Carson Daly on its sister station KAMP-FM. Daly also hosts a weekly top 30 countdown show The Daly Download with Carson Daly which is produced by Audacy, Inc. (formerly CBS Radio and is the parent of KAMP-FM) and syndicated though Westwood One. The program airs on Saturday and Sunday mornings in a 3–4 hour edition on CHR/hot AC radio stations.

== Early life ==
Daly was born on June 22, 1973, in Santa Monica, California. He is the son of Coachella Valley TV personality Pattie Daly Caruso (1944–2017), and car salesman Jim "J.D." Daly. His mother is from Fayetteville, North Carolina. His father died from bladder cancer when Carson was a child, and his mother married Richard Caruso (1932–2017).

Daly attended Santa Monica High School and was a member of the school's golf team before graduating in 1991. He attended Loyola Marymount University in Los Angeles but dropped out to pursue a pro golf career. He is of Irish descent and has worked with Guinness on local "Proposition 3–17" to make Saint Patrick's Day an official holiday. Daly served as an intern to Jimmy Kimmel in radio. He began his radio career at College of the Desert and as an intern at the former KCMJ FM (now KKUU) under the name "Kid Carson".

== Career ==
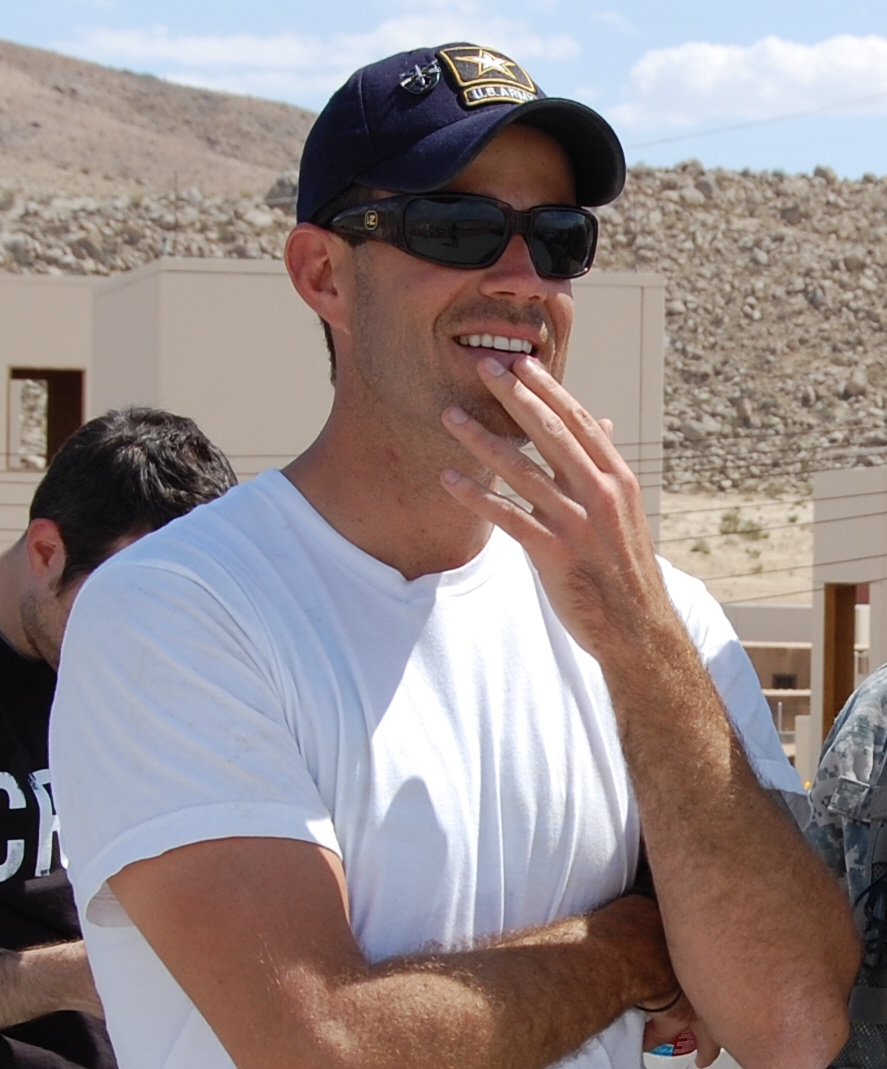
Daly at Fort Irwin Military Reservation (May 2009)

Daly began his broadcasting career at the radio station KOME in San Jose, California. Daly was then given the 6–10 PM time slot at KOME's sister station KROQ in Los Angeles. It was during Daly's time at KROQ that MTV recruited Daly to serve as a VJ during MTV's summer beach house programming called "Motel California".

At the end of the summer of 1997, MTV hired Daly as a permanent VJ, a position which required Daly to relocate to New York. Once in New York, Daly began hosting MTV Live.

Daly hosted MTV'S TRL from 1998 to 2003, with occasional appearances in 2004. TRL was based on two previous shows, Total Request and MTV Live, both of which had also been hosted by Daly. Daly's role as host of the popular live program included introducing the top 10 videos of the day and interviewing celebrity guests.

In 2002, Last Call with Carson Daly debuted. The show was shot on the same set as Saturday Night Live until 2005, when it moved to Los Angeles.

Beginning in 2003–2004, Daly began hosting a New Year's Eve special for NBC, New Year's Eve with Carson Daly.

In 2011, Daly began hosting and producing NBC's reality music competition The Voice. Daly's duties as host included watching blind auditions alongside contestant's family members. On August 4, 2026, it was confirmed by NBC that his final series would be the 30th . As a producer of The Voice, Daly has won four Emmy Awards for Outstanding Reality-Competition Program, first in 2013 and again from 2015, 2016, and 2017.

When social media correspondent Christina Milian departed the show in 2013, Daly became the sole host. On August 4, 2026, NBC confirmed that Daly would be leaving The Voice after its 30th season and Keke Palmer would be taking over as the show's host in its 31st season set to premiere in 2027.

Daly appeared in a brief but pivotal role in the first episode of My Name Is Earl. While in the hospital after being hit by a car, Earl learns about karma from watching an episode of Last Call with Carson Daly where Daly claims that his success is a direct result of doing good things for other people. Earl is thus inspired by Carson Daly to turn his own life around, and sets out to make up for his many past wrongs.

Daly had a small role on Dave Chappelle's show Chappelle's Show.

In September 2013, Daly became the Orange Room anchor (social media reporter) on the Today show, as well as serving as a fill-in anchor for Willie Geist and the show's weekend edition (Weekend Today). Since Studio 1A was updated for Election Night 2020 with the Orange Room being covered by a large video wall, Daly's title has been rebranded on Today's website as a feature anchor or co-host. His main contribution to the program every morning is the "PopStart" segment at the end of the 8:00 half-hour, which focuses on celebrity news. In October 2026, Daly started regularly co-hosting Saturday Today alongside Laura Jarrett. Daly was named co-anchor of Saturday Today on November 5, 2026.

Daly is a founding partner, along with Jonathan Rifkind, Jonathan B. Davis, and Bam Margera, of an independent record label, 456 Enterprise & Entertainment, which released the "Viva La Bands" compilations.

== Personal life ==
Carson Daly resides in the Village of Flower Hill, on Long Island.

In March 2000, Tara Reid met Daly on the set of Total Request Live, and they began dating. They shared an apartment in New York City and Daly proposed on October 29. In June 2001, Reid and Daly broke off their engagement.

Daly became engaged to Siri Pinter, a food blogger, in 2013. Her father is actor Mark Pinter. The couple married on December 23, 2015 and have four children.

Daly is Catholic.

Daly has stated that he struggles with generalized anxiety disorder and panic disorder.

== Radio shows ==
- Most Requested, syndicated daily show (2001–2006)
- Mornings with Carson Daly, KAMP-FM, Los Angeles (2010–2017)
- The Daly Download with Carson Daly, syndicated (2013–)

== Filmography ==
Television
Year	Title	Role
1997–1998	MTV Live	Host
1998	Total Request	Host
1998–2003, 2004	TRL	Host
1999	Miss Teen USA	Host
2000	Daria Presents "Is It Fall Yet?"	David (Quinn's Tutor)
2000	Miss USA	Host
2001	Josie and the Pussycats	Himself
2001	Joe Dirt	Himself
2002	It's a Very Merry Muppet Christmas Movie	Himself
2002–2019	Last Call with Carson Daly	Host
2002	Sabrina the Teenage Witch	Himself
2003	Windy City Heat	Himself
2003–2016, 2018–2020	New Year's Eve with Carson Daly	Host
2005, 2009	My Name Is Earl	Himself
2011–	The Voice	Host
2013–	Today	Orange Room Anchor/Co-Host

Media offices
Preceded by n/a	Host of The Voice; 2011–present With: Alison Haislip (2011); Christina Milian (2012–2013)	Succeeded by present
