= Total Request Live =

American music video television program

- Also known as: TRL
- Presented by: Carson Daly; Dave Holmes; Brian McFayden; Hilarie Burton; Quddus; Damien Fahey; La La Vasquez; Vanessa Minnillo; Susie Castillo; Lyndsey Rodrigues; D.C. Young Fly; Tamara Dhia; Amy Pham; Erik Zachary; Lawrence Jackson; Matt Rife; Sway; Jamila Mustafa; Kevan Kenney
- Country of origin: United States
- Original language: English
- No. of seasons: 20
- No. of episodes: 2,254

Production
- Running time: 45–48 minutes (initially); 20–23 minutes (final episodes)

Original release
- Network: MTV
- Release: September 14, 1998 – November 16, 2008
- Release: October 2, 2017 – 2019

Total Request Live (commonly abbreviated as TRL) is an American television program that premiered on MTV on September 14, 1998. The early version of TRL featured popular music videos played during its countdown and was also used as a promotion tool by musicians, actors, and other celebrities to promote their newest works to target the show's teen demographic.

During the original run of the program, TRL played the ten most requested music videos of the day, as voted on by viewers via phone or online. The show generally aired Monday through Thursday for one hour, though the scheduling and length of the show fluctuated over the years. Although TRL was billed as a live show, many episodes were prerecorded. Due to declining ratings, and the larger decline of music-based television in favor of online services, MTV announced the cancellation of TRL on September 15, 2008. The special three-hour finale episode, Total Finale Live, aired on November 16, 2008.

TRL was revived on October 2, 2017. In 2019, the show aired Saturday mornings at 10:00 am ET as TRL Top 10. The show was then rebranded to Fresh Out Live.

== History ==
=== Origin ===
Total Request Live originated from several pre-existing programs on MTV. Various viewer request shows, such as Dial MTV and MTV's Most Wanted, had aired on the network since 1986. In 1997 and 1998, MTV launched two new shows that became the predecessors of TRL: MTV Live, which was hosted by Toby Amies, Carson Daly, and Ananda Lewis and featured live performances and interviews from musical artists, and Total Request, a viewer request show hosted by Daly.

Total Request was more subdued than MTV Live, as Daly introduced music videos from an empty, dimly lit set. As the show progressed and gained more momentum, it was added to the daytime programming during MTV's Summer Share in Seaside Heights, New Jersey. The show proved to be one of the most watched and most interactive in MTV history, demonstrating that it had potential to become an even larger success.

=== Original run (1998–2008) ===
==== Carson Daly era ====
In September 1998, MTV producers merged the real-time aspect of MTV Live with the fan-controlled countdown aspect of Total Request into Total Request Live. The program made its debut from MTV Studios on September 14. The show then grew to become MTV's unofficial flagship program.

The original host of TRL, Carson Daly, brought popularity to the show. The abbreviation TRL was adopted as the official title of the show in February 1999, after Daly and Dave Holmes began using it on air regularly. In the years following, the program was rarely referred to by its original title. The show began successfully, receiving hundreds of votes for popular artists such as Aaliyah, Backstreet Boys, Blaque, Britney Spears, Christina Aguilera, Eminem, Hanson, Janet Jackson, Kid Rock, Korn, Limp Bizkit, *NSYNC, and TLC.

TRL spent its first year developing a cult-type following. In late 1999, a live studio audience was added. By early 2000, the show reached its peak, becoming a very recognizable pop culture icon in its first two years of existence. A weekend edition of the show known as TRL Weekend, with a countdown of the week's top 10 videos, aired for a short time in 2000.

In 2000, MTV gradually began introducing new VJs on TRL. After winning a viewer contest to interview celebrities at the 2000 MTV Video Music Awards, Hilarie Burton was hired as a full-time VJ. Quddus Philippe began hosting duties in May 2001 as part of MTV's Summer in the Keys. The following year, both Damien Fahey and La La Vasquez began hosting duties. These VJs often co-hosted with Daly or substituted in his absence.

In July 2001, MTV sponsored the Total Request Live Tour, which played over 30 dates in North America and featured acts like Destiny's Child, 3LW, Jessica Simpson, Eve, and Nelly.

On October 23, 2002, TRL celebrated its 1,000th episode. The number-one video on that day was "Dirrty" by Christina Aguilera. Also throughout 2002, original host Daly was gradually seen less often, as he had begun his own late-night talk show Last Call with Carson Daly on NBC. The show had near-daily segments from MTV News correspondents reporting on the latest in national or entertainment and music news from inside the studio.

==== Post-Carson Daly era ====
In 2005, the next generation of TRL was ushered in as Carson Daly officially stepped down as host to focus on his own talk show, which premiered two years earlier on NBC. Following Daly's departure, Damien Fahey, Hilarie Burton, Quddus, and La La Vasquez rotated as hosts. Later additions to the hosting roster included Vanessa Minnillo in 2003, Susie Castillo in 2005, Stephen Colletti and Cipha Sounds in 2006, and Lyndsey Rodrigues in 2007.

Some changes were made to TRL's voting process in 2005. The show previously allowed anyone to vote online several times, but as part of these changes, only registered members of MTV.com could vote online. Additionally, a limit of one vote per day was added. Then, on July 10, 2006, MTV announced that votes would not be taken by phone, ending the use of the "DIAL MTV" phone number, which had been in use for voting on MTV since the premiere of the countdown show Dial MTV in the mid-1980s.

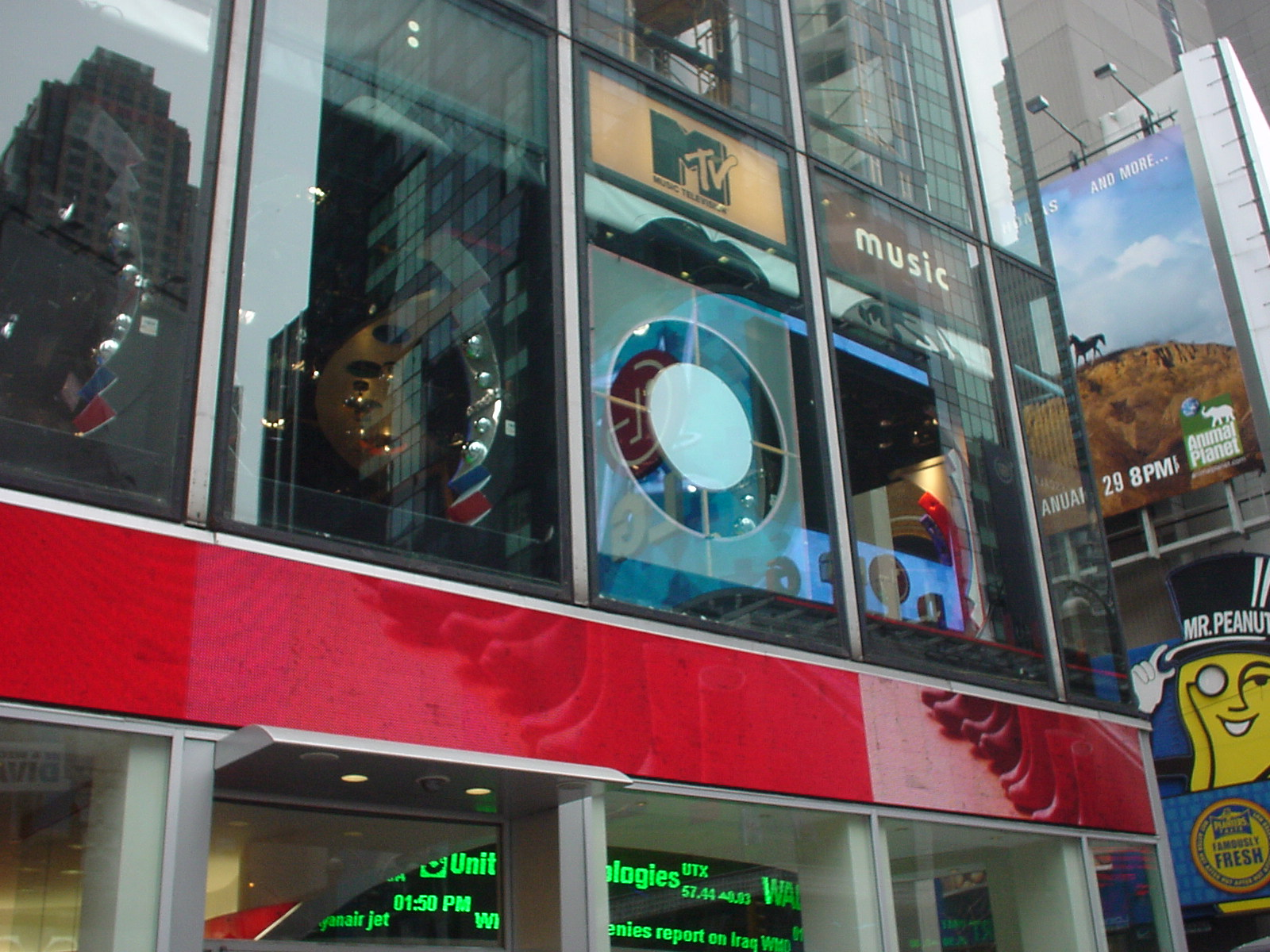
TRL's studios in Times Square in 2006

In September 2006, TRL reached its eighth anniversary and, at that point, the show was the longest-running live program that MTV had ever produced. Around this time, it began airing four days a week (Monday through Thursday), instead of all five weekdays. On November 2, 2006, the show introduced what was billed as the first-ever hip-hop public service announcement on global warming. The three-minute piece, titled "Trees", warned about deforestation and the dangers of global warming. The video corresponded with MTV's social campaign, Break the Addiction, as part of think MTV.

On May 22, 2007, TRL celebrated its 2000th episode, showing highlights from the past 2000 episodes, and a special countdown of ten of the most successful videos to ever appear on the show. Justin Timberlake's "Cry Me a River" topped the special countdown.

By 2008, the only remaining hosts of TRL were Fahey and Rodrigues. Burton left TRL in 2004 after joining the cast of The WB/CW's One Tree Hill. Quddus departed in 2006 and became host of TV One Access. Minnillo left in 2007 and resumed an acting career.

==== First cancellation ====
In 2007, rumors began circulating that the ratings-challenged music video countdown show was to be cancelled. In early 2007, an average of 373,000 viewers regularly watched the program. New York Daily News were one of the first to publish this rumor. In February 2007, MTV said the rumor was unfounded and claimed TRL would continue to air for the foreseeable future. The producers of TRL experimented with web-based viewer interaction throughout the 2006–2007 season, showing viral videos and allowing viewers to send feedback on a video via internet forums and webcams, along with a heavy emphasis on MTV's since discontinued Overdrive video portal. However, MTV still secretly planned to cancel the show and replace one with even more emphasis on viewer interaction, named YouRL (a homophone of URL.) Consequently, in July 2007, it was reported that YouRL was not received well by test audiences and the concept was abandoned. Total Request Live proceeded with a new season as usual on September 4, marking the tenth season of the show.

On September 15, 2008, it was announced that TRL would end. The final regular weekday episode aired on November 13, 2008, with guest Seth Green and The All-American Rejects. The Rejects spent the entire episode assisting in the tear down of the set which was a theme for the episode. At the end of the episode, Rodrigues and Fahey cooperatively added the last step in the demolition process by shutting down all the lights. Preceding this was a montage of cast and crew members saying their goodbyes by waving to the camera. Total Finale Live, a three-hour special marking the end of the show, aired on November 16, 2008. Several artists made appearances, including Ludacris, Snoop Dogg, Nelly, Beyoncé, 50 Cent, Fall Out Boy, Backstreet Boys, Justin Timberlake, Kid Rock, JC Chasez, Christina Aguilera, Travis Barker, Taylor Swift, Hilary Duff, Eminem, and Korn's Jonathan Davis. Former host Carson Daly described the media atmosphere after his departure from TRL in an interview with TV Guide: "MySpace was sold. Social networking took off. Technology went crazy. The whole tectonic shift of mass media. There were a lot of reasons why TRL became kind of a different show after I left. I don't necessarily think it had anything to with me leaving as much as it had to do with the changing landscape." The last music video to be played on TRL (during the final episode) was "...Baby One More Time" by Britney Spears, as the video that made number one on the countdown of the most iconic videos of all time.

==== Final top 10 ====
TRL chose the top ten most iconic videos and aired them as their final countdown.

Position	Year	Artist	Video	Director
1	1998	Britney Spears	"...Baby One More Time"	Nigel Dick
2	2000	Eminem	"The Real Slim Shady"	Dr. Dre/Philip Atwell
3	1999	Backstreet Boys	"I Want It That Way"	Wayne Isham
4	2000	*NSYNC	"Bye Bye Bye"	Wayne Isham
5	2002	Christina Aguilera featuring Redman	"Dirrty"	David LaChapelle
6	1999	Kid Rock	"Bawitdaba"	Dave Meyers
7	2003	Beyoncé featuring Jay-Z	"Crazy in Love"	Jake Nava
8	2004	Usher featuring Ludacris & Lil Jon	"Yeah!"	Mr. X
9	1999	Blink-182	"What's My Age Again?"	Marcos Siega
10	2003	Outkast	"Hey Ya!"	Bryan Barber

=== Revivals (2014–2016) ===
On June 25, 2014, MTV announced that they would bring back Total Request Live for a one-off special edition on July 2, presented by MTV personality Sway with recording artist Ariana Grande, who performed her single "Problem" and premiered her song "Break Free", as well as having her hip-hop knowledge tested in a "Hip Hop Mix Up" game. The special was titled Total Ariana Live and was broadcast from MTV's Times Square studio in front of a live audience. Grande called it "a huge honor" to bring back TRL. The episode drew an average of 456,000 viewers.

On September 27, 2016, as part of MTV's Elect This campaign, the network revived the program for a one-hour live special called Total Registration Live. It was simulcast on MTV's website, app, Facebook and YouTube pages, and ElectThis.com. It was hosted by Nessa and featured performances by Ty Dolla Sign from his politically motivated mixtape Campaign. Kendall Jenner appeared in Times Square on behalf of Rock the Vote, and Ana Marie Cox and Jamil Smith from MTV News appeared on-air for segments. There were other appearances by Joss Whedon, Camila Cabello, Vic Mensa, Natalia Dyer, and Mack Wilds. Stories of millennials who have been activists were spotlighted.

==== MTV Classic ====
Following the launch of MTV Classic on August 1, 2016, music video blocks have consistently aired on the network under the name Total Request Playlist. However, this is merely an automated playlist of pop, rap/hip-hop, R&B, and rock videos from the late 1990s to the 2000s.

=== Return (2017–2019) ===
2017 revival logo

Total Request AM logo

On July 30, 2017, MTV announced that the network would revive TRL. In addition to the hosts, Liza Koshy, The Dolan Twins, Eva Gutowski, Gabbie Hanna and Gigi Gorgeous were correspondents.

Since January 22, 2018, TRL has been shortened from a full hour to only a half-hour per day. The program was on hiatus until April 23, 2018. In February 2018, a half-hour late-night edition of TRL, Total Request LateNight was launched. The show aired Monday and Tuesday at 11 PM and was often an after-show for a preceding program. MTV announced plans to expand the show to three nights in the summer and four nights by the end of the year, but this never materialized. On April 23, 2018, MTV launched a pre-recorded, hour-long daily morning edition of TRL titled Total Request AM. The show aired at 8 AM and was hosted by Sway. Vinny from Jersey Shore was brought on as host for the first week and the first guests were boy band PrettyMuch. The program featured the return of a top ten countdown focusing on a specific playlist (Monday Motivation being the first countdown).

2019 saw another retooling and name change to TRL Top 10, which featured hosts Sway, Kevan Kenney and Jamila Mustafa. An offshoot of the program, Fresh Out Live, aired every Friday on MTV for a few years.

== Impact ==
TRL became "appointment after-school TV, its studio at 1515 Broadway a pop-culture fishbowl where rabid teens could catch a glimpse of their favorite stars." Debuting before social media platforms like Twitter, Instagram, and Facebook, the show is considered one "of the first truly interactive television shows, utilizing the synergy of the internet and television to countdown the top music videos of the day." Among the interactive features of TRL was the video shoutout, a 15-second video clip where fans could "appear, screen-within-screen, during the airing of a music video" screaming about their love for an artist or band. Because TRL was initially filmed in an age before social media, the show was seen as "the last pure view of...big celebrities. You were getting unadulterated ego." The show had a number of notably unscripted moments happen in studio, such as band members streaking or celebrities showing up unannounced. Taylor Hanson of Hanson, a frequent guest on TRL, said "Before you could see what an artist had for breakfast from Twitter, TRL was the place you were going to hear about it."

TRL not only became "destination TV" for young people to get news on their favorite stars and on pop culture, but also a place for viewers to stay updated with major world events as MTV News reporters would make regular appearances announcing news headlines. As MTV News correspondent SuChin Pak said, "For young people, TRL was not only where you got to see your rock idols and pop stars, but where you connected with the major events happening around the world, outside the small town you were living in."

The show was likened to the millennial generation's version of American Bandstand or Soul Train, averaging 853,000 viewers in 1999 according to Nielsen. TRL is widely viewed as the show that launched the careers of many artists from the late 1990s and early 2000s. MTV News correspondent John Norris said, "It's an interesting debate whether NSYNC, Backstreet Boys, Britney [Spears], Christina [Aguilera], Jessica [Simpson] and Good Charlotte would have had the careers they had without TRL." Writing for Spin, Peter Gaston opined that TRL "helped keep the major labels afloat by boosting pop artists sales numbers on the Billboard charts." TRL became a "must-stop on every celebrity's promotional itinerary." Musicians themselves including Eminem and Britney Spears would sometimes fill in for the hosts. The show was also the site of in-studio performances by big artists promoting album releases.

=== Boy bands ===
Even though late 1990s boy bands like Backstreet Boys and NSYNC released albums before TRL began in the fall of 1998, both groups only reached their commercial peaks after their videos were seen on TRL. In 1999, the Backstreet Boys' second LP, Millennium, achieved the highest first week sales ever from an LP at the time.

In 2000, when NSYNC released their second LP No Strings Attached, they topped the Backstreet Boys' first week sales and set a record for first-week album sales that would last for 15 years until Adele's 25 surpassed the record in 2015. Fans numbering in the thousands stood outside TRL's studio to see NSYNC or Backstreet Boys appear as guests, resulting in the closure of Times Square. Throughout most of 1998, 1999, and 2000, videos by the Backstreet Boys and *NSYNC would claim the top position on the countdown. Other boy bands of the era who achieved number one videos or received heavy rotation on the show included 98 Degrees, O-Town, B2K, soulDecision, and LFO.

=== Pop princesses ===
Pop singers like Britney Spears, Christina Aguilera, Mandy Moore and Jessica Simpson all made their music debuts on TRL as well. Spears, Aguilera, and Simpson would often appear as guests and their music videos would receive regular airplay. Simpson's video "Irresistible" reached number two on the countdown in 2001. Shakira made her English-language pop debut with "Whenever, Wherever", and saw regular number one spot status with the songs "Objection (Tango)", "La Tortura" (the first only Spanish-speaking song to reach number one on the countdown), and "Hips Don't Lie". Mandy Moore saw success on the show with her debut single's "Candy" in 1999 and "I Wanna Be with You", but did not score her first number-one video until her 2002 single "Crush".

Ashlee Simpson is another pop singer that has had success on TRL. Ashlee would go on to score two videos in the number one spot with "Boyfriend" and "Invisible." The artist with the most retired videos is Britney Spears with 13 videos retired, an honorary retired video ("I'm a Slave 4 U"), and three videos retired number one. A "pop princess" streak occurred in March 2007, where the number one and number two spots were women for every show. There was no other month in the history of TRL where every show had a woman at the top spot.

=== Rock bands ===
Although best known for featuring pop acts, TRL regularly featured videos and performances from rock bands in genres such as nu metal, pop-punk and emo pop. The nu metal/rap metal bands Korn and Limp Bizkit were particularly popular on the program in the late 1990s, and often shared airtime with Britney Spears and the Backstreet Boys. In later years, Green Day, Blink-182, My Chemical Romance, Linkin Park, Fall Out Boy and Sum 41 also were successful on the TRL chart.

=== Disney stars ===
Hilary Duff was the first Disney Star in heavy rotation on MTV, She premiered "So Yesterday", which peaked at number one days later, and continue to top the countdown with the videos for "Our Lips Are Sealed", "Fly", "Wake Up", "Beat of My Heart" and"With Love" and her popularity was a determining factor for other Disney stars on TRL. Vanessa Hudgens premiered "Come Back to Me", which peaked at number three, and "Say OK", which only went to number ten. The Jonas Brothers premiered their songs "Hold On" and "SOS" on the show; "SOS" made it on the countdown peaking at number six. "When You Look Me in the Eyes" was on the charts for several weeks before peaking at number one, after fans crushed and flooded the TRL site by requesting the video hundreds of times on March 19, 2008. "Burnin' Up" has also made it to the number-one spot on TRL. Ashley Tisdale premiered "He Said She Said" on TRL and it reached the number-one spot for 16 days and was retired at 40 days in the countdown, becoming the most successful song for a Disney recording artist in the show. Aly & AJ's videos for "Rush", "Chemicals React" and "Potential Breakup Song" have all been on the countdown with "Rush" peaking at number two, "Chemicals React" peaking at number four, and "Potential Breakup Song" peaking at number five. Miley Cyrus's "7 Things" premiered on TRL and reached number four on the show.

== Video game ==
Reception

Aggregate scores
Aggregator	Score
GameRankings	53.89%
Metacritic	48/100

Review scores
Publication	Score
AllGame	3/5 stars
GameSpot	4.1/10
GameZone	6.5/10
IGN	5/10
PC Gamer (US)	50%

A PC video game called MTV Total Request Live Trivia was developed by Hypnotix and published by Take-Two Interactive, with a release on August 14, 2001. GameRankings rated it at 53.89% acclaim, with a 48/100 grade from Metacritic.

== International versions ==
=== Past programs ===
- The first version of TRL outside the US was in Italy. Started on MTV Italy on 2 November 1999, it was hosted by Marco Maccarini and Giorgia Surina, followed by Federico Russo and Carolina Di Domenico. Since the 2005–06 season, Surina returned to TRL with a new co-host, Alessandro Cattelan. After the 2005–06 season, the show was hosted only by Cattelan. For the 2007–08 season, the show was hosted for the first moment by Cattelan and Elena Santarelli, and for the summer, the male host was replaced by Carlo Pastore. Later Pastore was still the main host, but the female host changed to Elisabetta Canalis. Throughout its eight seasons, TRL was broadcast from Milan, Rome, Venice, Naples, Genoa and Turin. TRL Italy is the longest-running show on MTV Italy: on 23 December 2004, a special two-hour event, "TRL #1000", was aired to celebrate the programme's 1000th episode. From 2006 to 2012, there was also an award programme called TRL Awards where viewers chose the artist of the year via web or mobile. In the summer of 2007, a special weekly show called TRL Extra Live aired, featuring Italian singers performing a mini-concert. The final version of the programme was hosted by Brenda Lodigiani, Alessandro Arcodia, Wintana Rezene and Andrea Cadioli under the name TRL on the Road and ended on 24 September 2010.

TRL logo used in Italy

- MTV România launched the Romanian version of TRL from an Orange concept store on Calea Victoriei (a major commercial avenue in the centre of Bucharest) on 23 January 2006. The show aired two times a week on Tuesday and Wednesday. The graphics were similar to that of the Italian version. The show was cancelled in 2009.
- The British version, known as TRL UK, was hosted by Dave Berry, Alex Zane, Jo Good, and Maxine Akhtar. It was broadcast live from MTV Networks Europe Studios in Camden, London before moving to Leicester Square in London from second series. Following the second series' broadcast from Leicester Square, the top ten countdown was removed from the show. The second series finished at the end of 2005 and the show never returned to air.
- The Australian version of TRL began as a weekend show, but then began airing live Monday through Friday. It was hosted by Maz Compton, Lyndsey Rodrigues, Nathan Sapsford, and Jason Robert Dundas. In early 2006, it returned to airing only on Friday evenings. The show was cancelled at the end of 2006 and was replaced by "The Lair". A revival of TRL returned in 2019. It is hosted by Ash London, Angus O'Loughlin, Flex Mami, and Lisa Hamilton.
- After a Polish version of TRL was unsuccessful, MTV Poland decided to launch a new chart show based on TRL's structure titled RMF MAXXX Hits, which aired from Monday to Saturday at 2 pm.
- MTV France launched the French version (Ton Request Live) of the US show on 24 January 2007. The format was different from the original concept: there was no video countdown and each episode included a film's mini-documentaries entitled "TRL en Movies". The show closed after only a single episode on 25 January 2007.
- The German version of TRL was very successful throughout Europe (after Italy), and it was known as Total Request Live Germany. TRL Germany had the highest television ratings of all the TRL versions in Europe. The show was hosted by Joko Winterscheidt and Mirjam Weichselbraun or Patrice Bouédibéla from Tuesday to Friday from 4:30 to 5:30 pm, and it was divided in four versions: Urban TRL (hip-hop music), Rock TRL (rock music), regular TRL (various genres), and TRL XXL (special live guest). It was replaced with MTV Home in Summer 2009.

=== Similar programs ===
- In Latin America, a version of TRL called Los 10+ Pedidos (The 10 Most Requested) airs daily. The show is hosted by "Gabo" and "Macarena".
- MTV Tr3s, a US channel targeted to bilingual Latino people, premiered Mi TRL in September 2006. The show carried the same format and graphics as the English-language version of TRL. Mi TRL was initially anchored by Carlos Santos and Susie Castillo, with Santos later being replaced by Denise Ramerez. MTV News segments on the show are delivered from Los Angeles by correspondent Liz Hernandez. The show was cancelled along with TRL in November 2008.
- Viacom's sister channel BET featured its own urban-oriented countdown, 106 & Park, and the two shows frequently competed with one another for guests, though by the end of the run of TRL, both shows aired with some space between them, allowing guests to appear on both shows on the same day.
- TeenNick featured a kid-friendly rendition of TRL called TeenNick Top 10.
- Westwood One produced a radio version of TRL, titled the MTV TRL Weekend Countdown (later the MTV Weekend Countdown) from 2001 to 2013. It was hosted by Brian McFayden (2001–2002), followed by Damien Fahey (2002–2013).

== See also ==
- List of Total Request Live number one music videos
