= MTV Live (American TV program) =

MTV Live is an American television program that aired from 1997 to 1998 on MTV, featuring interviews with celebrity guests, live musical performances, news coverage, and music video premieres.

== 1997 series ==
The program began its run in September 1997 in the then-newly acquired Times Square Studio on Broadway in New York. Toby Amies, Carson Daly and Ananda Lewis served as resident hosts to the daily hour-long live broadcast until its eventual merger with Total Request on September 14, 1998, forming what is now known as Total Request Live. In a similar vein to its successor, the series featured celebrity interviews, music video premieres, musical performances, and reports from MTV News. Through a partnership with Intel, viewers were able to call into the show via voice or video calls using their own computers or kiosks established at locations such as the Mall of America.

== 2007 series ==
A separate program with the same title began airing on MTV in February 2007. This version of MTV Live featured live performances filmed at the Hard Rock Cafe in Times Square. Through a partnership with Verizon Wireless, subscribers were able to submit text comments from their cellphones to appear in a crawl on the screen, as well as have their cellphone concert footage edited into the program.
