= MTV =

American cable television channel

- Logo used since September 9, 2021
- Type: Music channel (formerly); Entertainment (current)
- Country: United States
- Broadcast area: United States
- Headquarters: One Astor Plaza, 1515 Broadway, Times Square, Manhattan, New York City

Programming
- Languages: English; Spanish (via SAP audio track)
- Picture format: 1080p HDTV
- Timeshift service: MTV East (New York City); MTV West (Los Angeles)

Ownership
- Owner: Skydance Global Cable Media (Skydance)
- Parent: MTV Entertainment Group
- Sister channels: list of assets owned by Skydance

History
- Launched: August 1, 1981; 45 years ago
- Founder: Mark Booth; Tom Freston; Judy McGrath; Robert Pittman; Fred Seibert; John Sykes
- Former names: MTV: Music Television (1981–2010)

Links
- Website: mtv.com

Availability

Streaming media
- Affiliated Streaming Service: Paramount+
- Service(s): DirecTV Stream, FuboTV, Hulu + Live TV, Philo, Sling TV, YouTube TV

MTV (originally an initialism of Music Television) is an American cable television channel and the flagship namesake property of the Skydance Global Cable Media, a sub-division of the Skydance TV, division of Skydance. Launched on August 1, 1981, the channel originally aired music videos and related music entertainment programming guided by television personalities known as video jockeys (VJs). MTV soon began establishing its presence overseas (MTV Biggest pop), eventually gaining an unprecedented cult following and becoming one of the major factors in the rise of cable programming, leading American corporations to dominate the television economy in the 1990s.

Roughly four decades after its inception, the channel significantly shifted its focus away from music in favor of original reality programming for teenagers and young adults. As of November 2023, MTV is available to approximately 67 million pay television households in the United States, down from its 2011 peak of 99 million households.

== History ==
MTV was launched on August 1, 1981, at 12:01 a.m., under the ownership of Warner-Amex Satellite Entertainment. The first video played on MTV was "Video Killed the Radio Star" by the Buggles. On June 25, 1984, Warner Communications spun-off Nickelodeon and MTV into a new public corporation called MTV Networks (now Paramount Media Networks). Prior to MTV's launch, Warner Cable's Columbus QUBE operation served as an experimental programming environment that supplied programming to early satellite networks including Nickelodeon. PopClips, a music-video program commissioned by Warner-Amex, later became an important precursor to MTV. Warner would later acquire American Express' 50% stake the following year. From August 27, 1985, to May 20, 1986, Warner would sell 31%, and later, 69% of MTV Networks to Viacom. After more than 40 years, MTV would be returned under the same ownership with Warner when Viacom's ultimate successors, Paramount Skydance, reached the agreement with Warner's ultimate successors, Warner Bros. Discovery.

== Programming ==
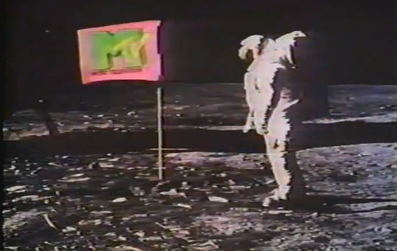
The first images shown on MTV were a montage of the Apollo 11 moon landing

As MTV expanded, music videos and VJ-guided programming were no longer the centerpiece of its programming (except MTV Germany). The channel's programming has covered a wide variety of genres and formats aimed at adolescents and young adults. In addition to its original programming, MTV has also aired original and syndicated programs from Paramount-owned siblings and third-party networks.

MTV is also a producer of films aimed at young adults through its production label, MTV Films, and has aired both its own theatrically released films and original made-for-television movies from MTV Studios in addition to acquired films.

In 2010, a study by the Gay and Lesbian Alliance Against Defamation found that of 207.5 hours of prime time programming on MTV, 42% included content reflecting the lives of gay, bisexual, and transgender people. This was the highest in the industry and the highest percentage ever.

In 2018, MTV launched a new production unit under the MTV Studios name focused on producing new versions of MTV's library shows. It was later consolidated into MTV Entertainment Studios

=== Video Music Awards ===
In 1984, the channel produced its first MTV Video Music Awards show, or VMAs. The first award show, in 1984, was punctuated by a live performance by Madonna of "Like a Virgin". The statuettes that are handed out at the Video Music Awards are of the MTV moon-man, the channel's original image from its first broadcast in 1981. As of 2012, the Video Music Awards were MTV's most watched annual event.

=== Special, annual events ===
MTV began its annual Spring Break coverage in 1986, setting up temporary operations in Daytona Beach, Florida, for a week in March, broadcasting live 8 hours per day. "Spring break is a youth culture event", MTV's vice president Doug Herzog said at the time. "We wanted to be part of it for that reason. It makes good sense for us to come down and go live from the center of it, because obviously the people there are the kinds of people who watch MTV."

The channel later expanded its beach-themed events to the summer, dedicating most of each summer season to broadcasting live from a beach house at different locations away from New York City, eventually leading to channel-wide branding throughout the summer in the 1990s and early 2000s such as Motel California, Summer Share, Isle of MTV, SoCal Summer, Summer in the Keys, and Shore Thing. MTV VJs would host blocks of music videos, interview artists and bands, and introduce live performances and other programs from the beach house location each summer.

MTV also held week-long music events that took over the presentation of the channel. Examples from the 1990s and 2000s include All Access Week, a week in the summer dedicated to live concerts and festivals; Spankin' New Music Week, a week in the fall dedicated to brand new music videos; and week-long specials that culminated in a particular live event, such as Wanna be a VJ and the Video Music Awards.

At the end of each year, MTV previously took advantage of its home location in New York City to broadcast live coverage on New Year's Eve in Times Square. Several live music performances were featured alongside interviews with artists and bands that were influential throughout the year. For many years from the 1980s to the 2000s, the channel upheld a tradition of having a band perform a cover song at midnight immediately following the beginning of the new year.

=== Live concert broadcasts ===
Throughout its history, MTV has covered global benefit concert series live. For most of July 13, 1985, MTV showed the Live Aid concerts, held in London and Philadelphia and organized by Bob Geldof and Midge Ure to raise funds for famine relief in Ethiopia. While the ABC network showed only selected highlights during prime-time, MTV broadcast 16 hours of coverage.

Along with VH1, MTV broadcast the Live 8 concerts, a series of concerts set in the G8 states and South Africa, on July 2, 2005. Live 8 preceded the 31st G8 summit and the 20th anniversary of Live Aid. MTV drew heavy criticism for its coverage of Live 8. The network cut to commercials, VJ commentary, or other performances during performances. Complaints surfaced on the Internet over MTV interrupting the reunion of Pink Floyd. In response, MTV president Van Toffler stated that he wanted to broadcast highlights from every venue of Live 8 on MTV and VH1, and clarified that network hosts talked over performances only in transition to commercials, informative segments or other musical performances. Toffler acknowledged that "MTV should not have placed such a high priority on showing so many acts, at the expense of airing complete sets by key artists." He also blamed the Pink Floyd interruption on a mandatory cable affiliate break. MTV averaged 1.4 million viewers for its original July 2 broadcast of Live 8. Consequently, MTV and VH1 aired five hours of uninterrupted Live 8 coverage on July 9, with each channel airing other blocks of artists.

== Logo and branding ==
MTV's first logo, used from August 1, 1981 to May 31, 1994

MTV's second logo, used from June 1, 1994 to February 7, 2010. It was still used outside United States until July 1, 2011.

One of many MTV station IDs used during the 1980s, this one was designed by Henry Selick.

MTV's logo was designed in 1981 by Manhattan Design (a collective formed by Frank Olinsky, Pat Gorman and Patty Rogoff) under the guidance of original creative director Fred Seibert. The block letter "M" was sketched by Rogoff, with the scribbled word "TV" spraypainted by Olinksky. The primary variant of MTV's logo at the time had the "M" in yellow and the "TV" in red. However, unlike most television networks' logos at the time, the logo was constantly branded with different colors, patterns, and images on a variety of station IDs. Examples include 1988's ID "Adam And Eve", where the "M" is an apple and the snake is the "TV". And for 1984's ID "Art History", the logo is shown in different art styles. The only constant aspects of MTV's logo at the time were its general shape and proportions, with everything else being dynamic.

MTV launched on August 1, 1981, with an extended network ID featuring the first landing on the Moon (with still images acquired directly from NASA), which was a concept of Seibert's executed by Buzz Potamkin and Perpetual Motion Pictures. The ID then cut to the American flag planted on the Moon's surface changed to show the MTV logo on it, which rapidly changed into different colors and patterns several times per second as the network's original guitar-driven jingle was played for the first time. After MTV's launch, the "Moon landing" ID was edited to show only its ending, and was shown at the top of every hour until early 1986, when the ID was scrapped in light of the Space Shuttle Challenger disaster. (since then the space theme and the Moonman became a fixture of MTV's branding most notably in its award show statue) The ID ran "more than 75,000 times each year (48 times each day), at the top and bottom of every hour every day" according to Seibert.

Comparison of MTV's original 1980s branding and its 2009 branding

From the late 1990s to the early 2000s, MTV updated its on-air appearance at the beginning of every year and each summer, creating a consistent brand across all of its music-related shows. This style of channel-wide branding came to an end as MTV drastically reduced its number of music-related shows in the early to mid-2000s. Around this time, MTV introduced a static and single color digital on-screen graphic mainly grey during on-air and some color to be shown during all of its programming.

MTV's former logo used on-air from February 8, 2010 to September 8, 2021. It was still used on some MTV programs and YouTube channels as the logo thumbnail on some videos.

Starting with the premiere of the short-lived program FNMTV: Friday Night MTV in 2008, MTV started using an updated and cropped version of its original logo for 30 years during most of its on-air programming. It became MTV's official logo on February 8, 2010, and officially debuted on its website. The channel's full text "MUSIC TELEVISION" was eliminated, with the revised and chopped down on the logo largely the same as the original logo, but without the initialism, the bottom of the "M" being cropped and the "V" in "TV" no longer branching off. This change was most likely made to reflect MTV's more prominent focus on reality and comedy programming and less on music-related programming. However, much like the original logo, the new logo was designed to be filled in with a seemingly unlimited variety of images. It is used worldwide, but not everywhere is it used existentially. The new logo was first used on MTV Films logo with the 2010 film Jackass 3D. MTV's rebranding was overseen by Popkern.

On June 25, 2015, MTV International rebranded its on-air look with a new vaporwave and seapunk-inspired graphics package. It included a series of new station IDs featuring 3D renderings of objects and people, much akin to vaporwave and seapunk "aesthetics". Many have derided MTV's choice of rebranding, insisting that the artistic style was centered on denouncing corporate capitalism (many aesthetic pieces heavily incorporate corporate logos of the 1970s, 80s and 90s, which coincidentally include MTV's original logo) rather than being embraced by major corporations like MTV. Many have also suggested that MTV made an attempt to be relevant in the modern entertainment world with the rebrand. In addition to this, the rebrand was made on exactly the same day that the social media site Tumblr introduced Tumblr TV, an animated GIF viewer which featured branding inspired by MTV's original 1980s on-air look. Tumblr has been cited as a prominent location of aesthetic art, and thus many have suggested MTV and Tumblr "switched identities". The rebrand also incorporated a modified version of MTV's classic "I Want My MTV!" slogan, changed to read "I Am My MTV." Vice has suggested that the slogan change represents "the current generation's movement towards self-examination, identity politics and apparent narcissism." MTV also introduced MTV Bump, a website that allows Instagram and Vine users to submit videos to be aired during commercial breaks, as well as MTV Canvas, an online program where users submit custom IDs to also be aired during commercial breaks.

Logo since September 9, 2021

MTV's single color version, used for specific pieces of content

On February 5, 2021, MTV began to use a revised logo in tandem with the 2010 version, doing away with the 3D effect inherited from its predecessors (much akin to the current MTV Video Music Awards variant). That logo is revealed to be an alternate variant of the current logo designed by the design agency Loyalkaspar, which pays homage to MTV of the past with the red-yellow-blue color combination and the 3D effect mainly inherited from its predecessor logo. The new logo's rollout was completed in time for the 2021 MTV Video Music Awards.

=== "I Want My MTV!" ===
The channel's iconic "I Want My MTV!" advertising campaign was launched in 1982. It was first developed by George Lois and was based on a cereal commercial from the 1950s with the slogan "I Want My Maypo!" that Lois adapted unsuccessfully from the original created by animator John Hubley.

Lois's first pitch to the network was roundly rejected when Lois insisted that rock stars like Mick Jagger should be crying when they said the tag line, not unlike his failed 'Maypo' revamp. His associate, and Seibert mentor Dale Pon, took over the campaign, both strategically and creatively. Pon was able to get the campaign greenlit after removing the "crying" and "tears" elements from the concept. From then on Pon was the primary creative force.

All the commercials were produced by Buzz Potamkin and his new company Buzzco Productions, directed first by Thomas Schlamme and Alan Goodman and eventually by Candy Kugel.

The campaign featured popular artists and celebrities, including Pete Townshend, Pat Benatar, Adam Ant, David Bowie, the Police, Kiss, Culture Club, Billy Idol, Hall & Oates, Cyndi Lauper, Madonna, Lionel Richie, Ric Ocasek, John Mellencamp, Peter Wolf, Joe Elliott, Stevie Nicks, Rick Springfield, and Mick Jagger, interacting with the MTV logo on-air and encouraging viewers to call their pay television providers and request that MTV be added to their local channel lineups. Eventually, the slogan became so ubiquitous that it made an appearance as a lyric sung by Sting on the Dire Straits song "Money for Nothing", whose music video aired in regular rotation on MTV when it was first released in 1985 and also served as the first video played on its European arm, and became the basis of the music used in the MTV Entertainment Studios production logo.

== Influence and controversies ==
The channel was a target of criticism by different groups about programming choices, social issues, political correctness, sensitivity, censorship, and a perceived negative social influence on young people. Portions of the content of MTV's programs and productions came under controversy in the general news media and among social groups that took offense. Some within the music industry criticized what they saw as MTV's homogenization of rock 'n' roll, including the punk band the Dead Kennedys, whose song "M.T.V. – Get Off the Air" was released on their 1985 album Frankenchrist, just as MTV's influence over the music industry was being solidified. MTV was also the major influence on the growth of music videos during the 1980s.

=== Breaking the "color barrier" ===
During MTV's first few years, very few black artists were featured. The select few in MTV's rotation between 1981 and 1984 were Michael Jackson, Prince, Eddy Grant, Tina Turner, Donna Summer, Joan Armatrading, Musical Youth, The Specials, The Selecter, Grace Jones, John Butcher and Herbie Hancock. Mikey Craig of Culture Club, Joe Leeway of Thompson Twins and Tracy Wormworth of The Waitresses are also black. The Specials, which included black and white vocalists and musicians, were also the first act with people of color to perform on MTV; their song "Rat Race" was the 58th video on the station's first broadcast day.

MTV refused other black artists' videos, such as Rick James' "Super Freak", because they did not fit the channel's carefully selected album-oriented rock format at the time. The exclusion enraged James, who publicly advocated the addition of more black artists to the channel. David Bowie also questioned MTV's lack of black artists during an on-air interview with VJ Mark Goodman in 1983. MTV's original head of talent and acquisition, Carolyn B. Baker, who was black, questioned why the definition of music had to be so narrow, as did a few others outside the network. Years later, Baker said, "The party line at MTV was that we weren't playing black music because of the research – but the research was based on ignorance… We were young, we were cutting-edge. We didn't have to be on the cutting edge of racism." Nevertheless, it was Baker who rejected Rick James' "Super Freak" video "because there were half-naked women in it, and it was a piece of crap. As a black woman, I did not want that representing my people as the first black video on MTV."

The network's director of music programming, Buzz Brindle, told an interviewer in 2006: "MTV was originally designed to be a rock music channel. It was difficult for MTV to find African American artists whose music fit the channel's format that leaned toward rock at the outset." Writers Craig Marks and Rob Tannenbaum noted that the channel "aired videos by plenty of white artists who didn't play rock." Andrew Goodwin later wrote: "[MTV] denied racism, on the grounds that it merely followed the rules of the rock business." MTV senior executive vice president Les Garland complained decades later, "The worst thing was that 'racism' bullshit ... there were hardly any videos being made by black artists. Record companies weren't funding them. They never got charged with racism." However, critics of that defence pointed out that record companies were not funding videos for black artists because they knew they would have difficulty persuading MTV to play them. The book The Vault: The Definitive Guide to the Musical World of Prince, which was co-written by the artist, states that while Bob Pittman had defined the channel's focus as "strictly rock and roll", the network nevertheless picked up the video to Prince's "1999" on December 16, 1982.

In celebrating the 40th anniversary of the network's launch in 2021, current MTV Entertainment Group president Chris McCarthy acknowledged that "(o)ne of the bigger mistakes in the early years was not playing enough diverse music ... but the nice thing that I've always learned at MTV is we have no problem owning our mistakes, quickly correcting them and trying to do the right thing and always follow where the audience is going."

Before 1983, Michael Jackson also struggled for MTV airtime. To resolve the struggle and finally "break the color barrier", the president of CBS Records, Walter Yetnikoff, denounced MTV in a strong, profane statement, threatening to take away its right to play any of the label's music. However, Les Garland, then acquisitions head, said he decided to air Jackson's "Billie Jean" video without pressure from CBS, a statement later contradicted by CBS head of Business Affairs David Benjamin in Vanity Fair.

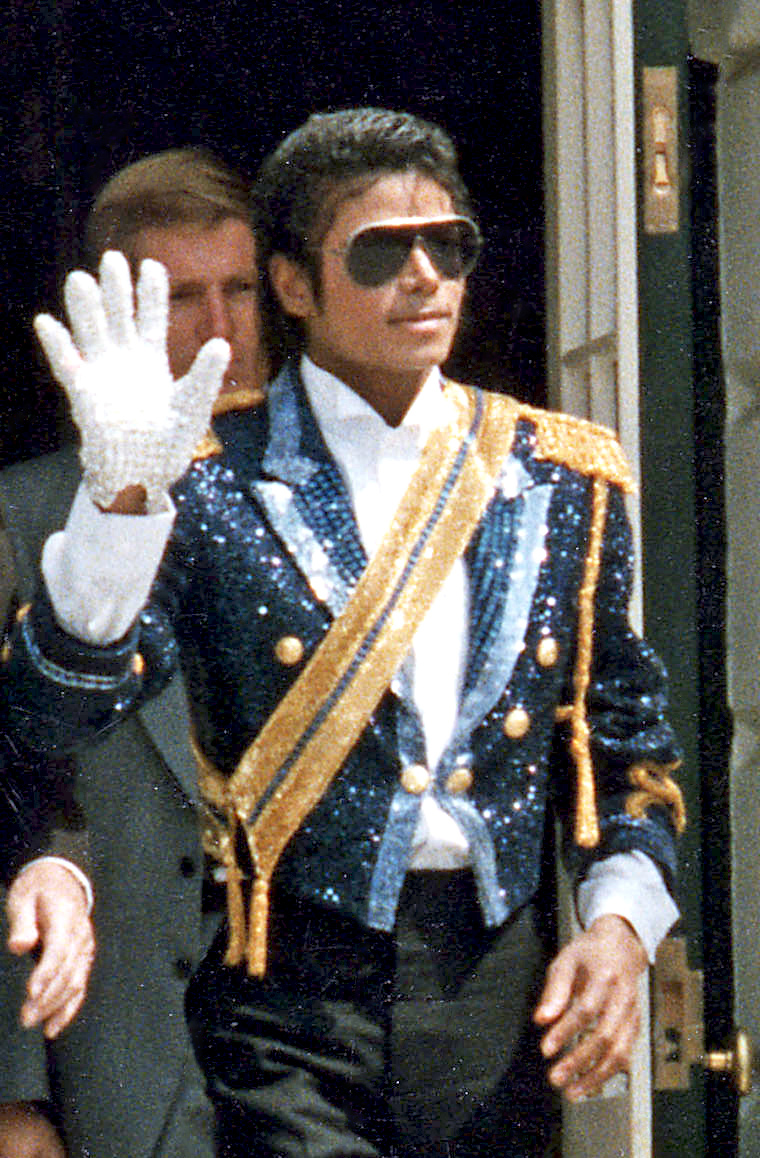
Michael Jackson, whose discography included music videos such as "Beat It", "Billie Jean", and "Thriller"

According to The Austin Chronicle, Jackson's video for the song "Billie Jean" was "the video that broke the color barrier, even though the channel itself was responsible for erecting that barrier in the first place." But change was not immediate. "Billie Jean" was not added to MTV's "medium rotation" playlist (two to three airings per day) until it reached No. 1 on the Billboard Hot 100 chart. In the final week of March, it was in "heavy rotation", one week before the MTV debut of Jackson's "Beat It" video. Prince's "Little Red Corvette" joined both videos in heavy rotation at the end of April. At the beginning of June, "Electric Avenue" by Eddy Grant joined "Billie Jean," which was still in heavy rotation until mid-June. At the end of August, "She Works Hard for the Money" by Donna Summer was in heavy rotation on the channel. Herbie Hancock's "Rockit" and Lionel Richie's "All Night Long" were placed in heavy rotation at the end of October and the beginning of November respectively. In the final week of November, Donna Summer's "Unconditional Love" was in heavy rotation. When Jackson's elaborate video for "Thriller" was released late that year, raising the bar for what a video could be, the network's support for it was total; subsequently, more pop and R&B videos were played on MTV.

Following Jackson's and Prince's breakthroughs on MTV, Rick James did several interviews where he brushed off the accomplishment as tokenism, saying in a 1983 interview, in an episode of Mike Judge Presents: Tales from the Tour Bus on James, that "any black artist that [had] their video played on MTV should pull their [videos] off MTV."

=== Subsequent concepts ===
HBO also had a 30-minute program of music videos called Video Jukebox, that first aired around the time of MTV's launch and lasted until late 1986. Also around this time, HBO, as well as other premium channels such as Cinemax, Showtime and The Movie Channel, occasionally played one or a few music videos between movies.

SuperStation WTBS launched Night Tracks on June 3, 1983, with up to 14 hours of music video airplay each late night weekend by 1985. Its most noticeable difference was that black artists that MTV initially ignored received airplay. The program ran until the end of May 1992.

Playboy TV launched their own music video program called "Playboy's Hot Rocks" that premiered on July 15, 1983, featuring uncensored versions of music videos that were shown in nightclubs by artists from Duran Duran and Mötley Crüe to Nine Inch Nails and 2Pac. At times, they would do a certain theme like the all Prince theme on the channel back in the 90s.

A few markets also launched music-only channels, including Las Vegas' KRLR-TV (now KSNV), which debuted in the summer of 1984 and was branded as "Vusic 21". The first video played on that channel was "Video Killed the Radio Star", following in the footsteps of MTV.

Shortly after TBS began Night Tracks, NBC launched a music video program called Friday Night Videos, which was considered network television's answer to MTV. Later renamed simply Friday Night, the program ran from 1983 to 2002. ABC's contribution to the music video program genre in 1984, ABC Rocks, was far less successful, lasting only a year.

TBS founder Ted Turner started the Cable Music Channel in 1984, designed to play a broader mix of music videos than MTV's rock format allowed. But after one month as a money-losing venture, Turner sold it to MTV, who redeveloped the channel into VH1.

The founders of Financial News Network, Glenn Taylor and Karen Tyler tried to capitalize on the concept by launching Discovery Music Network, which was set to be a cable network, and has plans to set up the Discovery Broadcasting System, which consists of the aforementioned network, along with computer and business networks, but it never got off the ground.

Shortly after its launch, Disney Channel aired a program called DTV, a play on the MTV acronym. The program used music cuts, both from past and upcoming artists. Instead of music videos, the program used clips of various vintage Disney cartoons and animated films (from Snow White and the Seven Dwarfs to The Fox and the Hound) to go with the songs. The program aired in multiple formats, sometimes between shows, sometimes as its own program, and other times as one-off specials. The specials tended to air both on the Disney Channel and NBC. The program aired at several times between 1984 and 1999. In 2009, Disney Channel revived the DTV concept with a new series of short-form segments called Re-Micks.

Hanna-Barbera created HBTV, similar to DTV in 1985 and in 1986.

=== Censorship ===
MTV has edited a number of music videos to remove nudity, references to drugs, sex, violence, weapons, racism, homophobia, and/or advertising. Many music videos aired on the channel were either censored, moved to late-night rotation, or banned entirely from the channel.

In the 1980s, parent media watchdog groups such as the Parents Music Resource Center (PMRC) criticized MTV over certain music videos that were claimed to have explicit imagery of satanism. As a result, MTV developed a strict policy on refusal to air videos that may depict Satanism or anti-religious themes. This policy led MTV to ban music videos such as "Jesus Christ Pose" by Soundgarden in 1991 and "Megalomaniac" by Incubus in 2004; however, the controversial band Marilyn Manson was among the most popular rock bands on MTV during the late 1990s and early 2000s.

On September 28, 2016, on an AfterBuzz TV live stream, Scout Durwood said that MTV had a "no appropriation policy" that forbid her from wearing her hair in cornrows in an episode of Mary + Jane. She said, "I wanted to cornrow my hair, and they were like, 'That's racist.'"

=== Trademark suit ===
Magyar Televízió, Hungary's public broadcaster who has a trademark on the initials MTV, registered with the Hungarian copyright office, sued the American MTV (Music Television) network for trademark infringement when the Hungarian version of the music channel was launched in 2007.

In 2008 according to the final verdict of the Hungarian Metropolitan Regional Court, although the national public broadcaster and the American entertainment station are identified by the same brand name in the same market, consumers couldn't confuse those TV channels. The two channels appear with the same label in public, but the services of the public broadcaster and the commercial channel cannot be compared either content-wise or stylistically.

=== Andrew Dice Clay ===
During the 1989 MTV Video Music Awards ceremony, comedian Andrew Dice Clay did his usual "adult nursery rhymes" routine (which he had done in his stand-up acts), after which the network executives imposed a lifetime ban. Billy Idol's music video for the song "Cradle of Love" originally had scenes from Clay's film The Adventures of Ford Fairlane when it was originally aired; scenes from the film were later excised. During the 2011 MTV Video Music Awards, Clay was in attendance where he confirmed that the channel lifted the ban.

=== Beavis and Butt-Head ===
In the wake of controversy that involved a child burning down his house after allegedly watching Beavis and Butt-head, MTV moved the show from its original 7 p.m. time slot to an 11 p.m. time slot. Also, Beavis's tendency to flick a lighter and yell "fire" was removed from new episodes, and controversial scenes were removed from existing episodes before their rebroadcast. Some extensive edits were noted by series creator Mike Judge after compiling his Collection DVDs, saying that "some of those episodes may not even exist actually in their original form."

=== Dude, This Sucks ===
A pilot for a show called Dude, This Sucks was cancelled after teens attending a taping at the Snow Summit Ski Resort in January 2001 were sprayed with liquidized fecal matter by a group known as "The Shower Rangers". The teens later sued, with MTV later apologizing and ordering the segment's removal.

=== Super Bowl XXXVIII halftime show ===
After Viacom's purchase of CBS, MTV was selected to produce the Super Bowl XXXV halftime show in 2001, airing on CBS and featuring Britney Spears, NSYNC, and Aerosmith. Due to its success, MTV was invited back to produce another halftime show in 2004; this sparked a nationwide debate and controversy that drastically changed Super Bowl halftime shows, MTV's programming, and radio censorship.

When CBS aired Super Bowl XXXVIII in 2004, MTV was again chosen to produce the halftime show, with performances by such artists as Nelly, P. Diddy, Janet Jackson, and Justin Timberlake. The show became controversial, however, after Timberlake tore off part of Jackson's outfit while performing "Rock Your Body" with her, revealing her right breast. All involved parties apologized for the incident, and Timberlake referred to the incident as a "wardrobe malfunction".

Michael Powell, then-chairman of the Federal Communications Commission (FCC), ordered an investigation the day after the broadcast. In the weeks following the halftime show, MTV censored much of its programming. Several music videos, including "This Love" and "I Miss You", were edited for sexual content. In September 2004, the FCC ruled that the halftime show was indecent and fined CBS $550,000. The FCC upheld it in 2006, but federal judges reversed the fine in 2008.

==== Nipplegate ====
Timberlake and Jackson's controversial event gave way to a "wave of self-censorship on American television unrivaled since the McCarthy era". After the sudden event, names surfaced such as nipplegate, Janet moment, and boobgate, and this spread politically, furthering the discussion into the 2004 presidential election surrounding "moral values" and "media decency".

=== Moral criticism ===
In 2005, the Parents Television Council (PTC) released a study titled "MTV Smut Peddlers", which sought to expose excessive sexual, profane, and violent content on the channel, based on MTV's spring break programming from 2004. Jeanette Kedas, an MTV network executive, called the PTC report "unfair and inaccurate" and "underestimating young people's intellect and level of sophistication", while L. Brent Bozell III, then-president of the PTC, stated: "the incessant sleaze on MTV presents the most compelling case yet for consumer cable choice", referring to the practice of pay television companies to allow consumers to pay for channels à la carte.

In April 2008, PTC released The Rap on Rap, a study covering hip-hop and R&B music videos rotated on programs 106 & Park and Rap City, both shown on BET, and Sucker Free on MTV. PTC urged advertisers to withdraw sponsorship of those programs, whose videos PTC stated targeted children and teenagers containing adult content.

=== Jersey Shore ===
MTV received significant criticism from Italian American organizations for Jersey Shore, which premiered in 2009. The controversy was due in large part to the manner in which MTV marketed the show, as it liberally used the word "guido" to describe the cast members. The word "guido" is generally regarded as an ethnic slur when referring to Italians and Italian Americans. One promotion stated that the show was to follow, "eight of the hottest, tannest, craziest Guidos," while yet another advertisement stated, "Jersey Shore exposes one of the tri-state area's most misunderstood species ... the GUIDO. Yes, they really do exist! Our Guidos and Guidettes will move into the ultimate beach house rental and indulge in everything the Seaside Heights, New Jersey scene has to offer."

Prior to the series debut, Unico National formally requested that MTV cancel the show. In a formal letter, the company called the show a "direct, deliberate and disgraceful attack on Italian Americans." Unico National President Andre DiMino said, "MTV has festooned the 'bordello-like' house set with Italian flags and red, white and green maps of New Jersey while every other cutaway shot is of Italian signs and symbols. They are blatantly as well as subliminally bashing Italian Americans with every technique possible." Around this time, other Italian organizations joined the fight, including the NIAF and the Order Sons of Italy in America.

MTV responded by issuing a press release which stated in part, "The Italian American cast takes pride in their ethnicity. We understand that this show is not intended for every audience and depicts just one aspect of youth culture." Following the calls for the show's removal, several sponsors requested that their ads not be aired during the show. These sponsors included Dell, Domino's Pizza, and American Family Insurance. Despite the loss of certain advertisers, MTV did not cancel the show. Moreover, the show saw its audience increase from its premiere in 2009, and continued to place as MTV's top-rated programs during Jersey Shore's six-season run, ending in 2012.

== Social activism ==
In addition to its regular programming, MTV has a long history of promoting social, political, and environmental activism in young people. The channel's vehicles for this activism have been Choose or Lose, encompassing political causes and encouraging viewers to vote in elections; Fight For Your Rights, encompassing anti-violence and anti-discrimination causes; think MTV; and MTV Act and Power of 12, the newest umbrellas for MTV's social activism.

=== Choose or Lose ===
MTV Choose or Lose logo

In 1992, MTV started a pro-democracy campaign called Choose or Lose, to encourage over 20 million people to register to vote, and the channel hosted a town hall forum for then-candidate Bill Clinton.

In recent years, other politically diverse programs on MTV have included True Life, which documents people's lives and problems, and MTV News specials, which center on very current events in both the music industry and the world. One special show covered the 2004 US presidential election, airing programs focused on the issues and opinions of young people, including a program where viewers could ask questions of Senator John Kerry. MTV worked with P. Diddy's "Citizen Change" campaign, designed to encourage young people to vote.

Additionally, MTV aired a documentary covering a trip by the musical group Sum 41 to the Democratic Republic of the Congo, documenting the conflict there. The group ended up being caught in the midst of an attack outside of the hotel and was subsequently flown out of the country.

The channel also began showing presidential campaign commercials for the first time during the 2008 US presidential election. This has led to criticism, with Jonah Goldberg opining that "MTV serves as the Democrats' main youth outreach program."

=== Rock the Vote ===
MTV is aligned with Rock the Vote, a campaign to motivate young adults to register and vote.

=== MTV Act and Power of 12 ===
In 2012, MTV launched MTV Act and Power of 12, its current social activism campaigns. MTV Act focuses on a wide array of social issues, while Power of 12 was a replacement for MTV's Choose or Lose and focused on the 2012 US presidential election.

=== Elect This ===
In 2016, MTV continued its pro-democracy campaign with Elect This, an issue-oriented look at the 2016 election targeting Millennials. Original content under the "Elect This" umbrella includes "Infographica," short animations summarizing MTV News polls; "Robo-Roundtable," a digital series hosted by animatronic robots; "The Racket," a multi-weekly digital series; and "The Stakes," a weekly political podcast.

=== Vote Early Day ===
In 2020, MTV was the principal founder of Vote Early Day. Initially, the primary target audience was young voters. The MTV campaign launched with partners across media, consumer brands, and advocacy organizations, and its strength being that it isn't 'owned' by any one entity.

== Beyond MTV ==
Since its launch in 1981, the brand "MTV" has expanded and includes many additional properties beyond the original MTV channel, including an array of sister channels in the US, dozens of affiliated channels all over the world, and an online presence through MTV.com and related websites.

=== Sister channels in the United States ===
MTV operates a group of channels under MTV Networks – a name that continues to be used for the individual units of the Paramount Media Networks, a division of corporate parent Paramount Global. In 1985, MTV saw the introduction of its first regular sister channel, VH1, which was originally an acronym for "Video Hits One" and was designed to play adult contemporary music videos, but later switched to different genres such as rap among others and all of the videos currently removed as of 2016. VH1 is aimed at celebrity and pop-culture programming, which includes many reality shows and later shifted to ethnically-diverse viewing in 2013. Another sister channel, CMT, targets the Southern U.S. culture market.

The advent of satellite television and digital cable brought MTV greater channel variety, including its sister channels MTV2 (currently, all music videos do not show up on the channel) and Spanish-language MTV Tr3́s (now rebranding as Tr3́s), which initially played music videos exclusively but later focused on other programming. MTV also formerly broadcast MTVU on campuses at various universities until 2018, when the MTV Networks on Campus division was sold, and the channel remained as a digital cable channel only as of currently. MTV formerly also had MTV Hits and MTVX channels until these were converted into NickMusic (under the editorial control of PS' kid-aimed Nickelodeon) and MTV Jams, respectively. MTV Jams was later rebranded as BET Jams in 2015 and BET removed all of the music videos along 106 & Park.

In January 2006, MTV launched MTV HD, a 1080i high-definition simulcast feed of MTV. Until Viacom's main master control was upgraded in 2013, only the network's original series after 2010 (with some pre-2010 content) are broadcast in high definition, while music videos, despite being among the first television works to convert to high definition presentation in the mid-2000s, were presented in 4:3 standard definition, forcing them into a windowboxing type of presentation; since that time, all music videos are presented in HD and are framed to their director's preference. Jersey Shore, despite being shot with widescreen HD cameras, was also presented with SD windowboxing (though the 2018 Family Vacation revival is in full HD). The vast majority of providers carry MTV HD.

MTV Networks also operates MTV Live, a high-definition channel that features original HD music programming and HD versions of music-related programs from MTV, VH1, and CMT. The channel was launched in January 2006 as MHD (Music: High Definition). The channel was officially rebranded as MTV Live on February 1, 2016.

In 2005 and 2006, MTV launched a list of channels for Asian Americans. The first channel was MTV Desi, launched in July 2005, dedicated towards Indian Americans. Next was MTV Chi, in December 2005, which catered to Chinese Americans. The third was MTV K, launched in June 2006 and targeted toward Korean Americans. Each of these channels featured music videos and shows from MTV's international affiliates as well as original US programming, promos, and packaging. All three of these channels ceased broadcasting on April 30, 2007.

On August 1, 2016, the 35th anniversary of the original MTV's launch, VH1 Classic was rebranded as MTV Classic. The channel's programming focused on classic music videos and programming (including notable episodes of MTV Unplugged and VH1 Storytellers), but skews more towards the 1980s, 1990s, 2000s and early-mid 2010s. The network aired encores of former MTV series such as Clone High (original) Beavis and Butt-Head and Laguna Beach: The Real Orange County. The network's relaunch included a broadcast of MTV's first hour on the air, which was also simulcast on MTV and online via Facebook live streaming. MTV Classic only retained three original VH1 Classic programs, which were That Metal Show, Metal Evolution, and Behind the Music Remastered, although repeats of current and former VH1 programs such as Pop-Up Video and VH1 Storytellers remained on the schedule. However, the rebranded MTV Classic had few viewers and declined quickly to become the least-watched English-language subscription network rated by Nielsen at the end of 2016. At the start of 2017, it was reorganized into an all-video network.

=== Internet ===
MTV.com in 2008

In the late 1980s MTV VJ Adam Curry began experimenting online. In 1993, he registered the then-unclaimed domain name "MTV.com" with the idea of being MTV's unofficial new voice on the Internet. Although this move was sanctioned by his supervisors at MTV Networks at the time, when Curry left to start his own web-portal design and hosting company, MTV subsequently sued him for the domain name, which led to an out-of-court settlement.

The service hosted at the domain name was originally branded "MTV Online" during MTV's first few years of control over it in the mid-1990s. It served as a counterpart to the America Online portal for MTV content, which existed at AOL keyword MTV until approximately the end of the 1990s. After this time, the website became known as simply "MTV.com" and served as the Internet hub for all MTV and MTV News content.

MTV.com experimented with entirely video-based layouts between 2005 and 2007. The experiment began in April 2005 as MTV Overdrive, a streaming video service that supplemented the regular MTV.com website. Shortly after the 2006 MTV Video Music Awards, which were streamed on MTV.com and heavily used the MTV Overdrive features, MTV introduced a massive change for MTV.com, transforming the entire site into a Flash video-based entity. Much of users' feedback about the Flash-based site was negative, demonstrating a dissatisfaction with videos that played automatically, commercials that could not be skipped or stopped, and the slower speed of the entire website. The experiment ended in February 2007 as MTV.com reverted to a traditional HTML-based website design with embedded video clips, in the style of YouTube and some other video-based websites.

From 2006 to 2007, MTV operated an online channel, MTV International, targeted to the broad international market. The purpose of the online channel was to air commercial-free music videos as television channels began focusing on shows unrelated to music videos or music-related programming.

The channel responded to the rise of the Internet as the new central place to watch music videos in October 2008 by launching MTV Music (later called MTV Hive), a website that featured thousands of music videos from MTV and VH1's video libraries, dating back to the earliest videos from 1981.

A newly created division of the company, MTV New Media, announced in 2008 that it would produce its own original web series, in an attempt to create a bridge between old and new media. The programming is available to viewers via personal computers, cell phones, iPods, and other digital devices.

In the summer of 2012, MTV launched a music discovery website called the MTV Artists Platform (also known as Artists.MTV). MTV explained, "While technology has made it way easier for artists to produce and distribute their own music on their own terms, it hasn't made it any simpler to find a way to cut through all the Internet noise and speak directly to all of their potential fans. The summer launch of the platform is an attempt to help music junkies and musicians close the gap by providing a one-stop place where fans can listen to and buy music and purchase concert tickets and merchandise."

MTV.com remains the official website of MTV, and it expands on the channel's broadcasts by bringing additional content to its viewers. In 2022, it was revised to mostly focus on directing consumers to content on Paramount+ and Pluto TV. The site featured an online version of MTV News and podcasts. It has TV Everywhere authenticated streaming. The news site is defunct but still can be accessed with prior movie features, profiles and interviews with recording artists and from MTV's television programs. A related MTV app was available on mobile platforms and connected TV devices.

=== MTV Games ===
MTV Games (formerly MTV Interactive from 1992 to 2005) is the video game division of MTV. It was originally a division of Viacom Consumer Products, with early games under the brand was published by company subsidiary Viacom New Media.

In 1997, MTV had signed a deal with GT Interactive to develop video game properties. MTV additionally in 1999 had signed a deal with THQ, who already had the Nickelodeon master game license, to develop video games based on MTV Sports. In 2000, the company had signed a deal with Simon & Schuster Interactive for video games based on the Daria TV show. Also that year, after GT Interactive was sold to Infogrames, MTV signed a deal with Take-Two Interactive Software.

In addition to IPs based on MTV shows, MTV was involved in producing the games Slamscape, and L.A. Rush, both derived from original IP.

In 2005, the company funded and endorsed the video game Guitar Hero. Also that year, MTV Interactive was renamed to MTV Games, and signed a deal with Midway Games. In 2006, the company had bought Harmonix, MTV would exit the game industry in 2011 after the sale of Harmonix.

== Termination of music programming ==
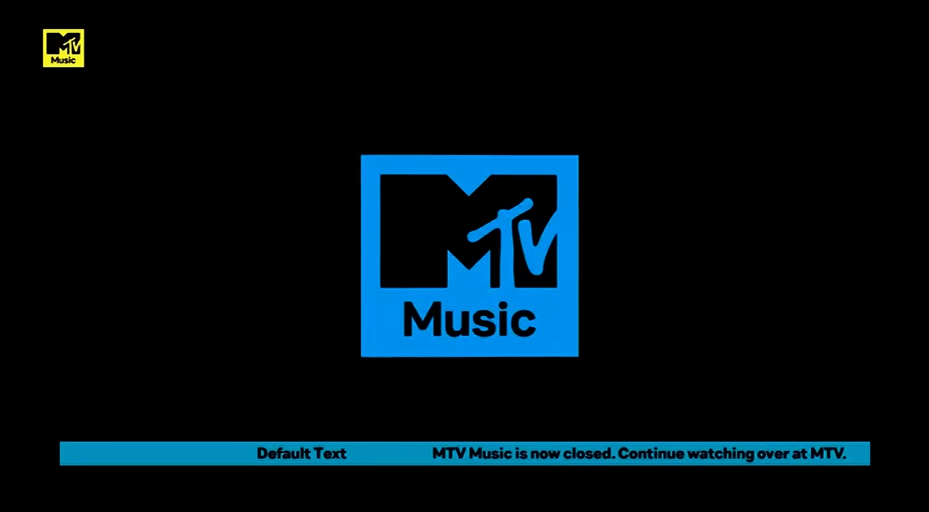
A final frame of MTV Music UK before the broadcast ended

MTV's music programming was terminated in many countries on December 31, 2025. The closure of the music channels, including MTV Music, MTV 80s, MTV 90s, Club MTV, MTV Base, MTV Hits, MTV 00s and MTV Live, first announced by parent company Paramount on October 10, 2025, was described by Euronews journalist David Mouriquand as "a sign of changing times". These MTV channels stopped broadcasting in Africa, Australia, Austria, Brazil, France, Germany, Hungary, Ireland, Poland, and the United Kingdom. The final song played on MTV in the UK was "Video Killed The Radio Star", the first song played in 1981, completing the loop. The broadcaster's "flagship" MTV channels would remain on air in these countries, showing reality series such as (for the British MTV) Dating Naked UK, Teen Mom, and Geordie Shore.

North American channels were unaffected at the time. As of February 2026, MTV only carries music videos in five regions: United States (through a 1 hour weekly block on the main network and several side channels on cable and Pluto TV), Japan, Israel, Taiwan, and India.

== See also ==
- History of MTV
- List of MTV award shows
- List of MTV channels
  - MTV Canada
  - MTV Australia and New Zealand
  - MTV India
  - MTV Latin America
  - MTV Global
