= MTV (Lithuania and Latvia) =

Television channel

MTV Lithuania & Latvia

Ownership
- Owner: MTV Networks Europe / Ananey Communications Ltd.
- Sister channels: MTV Estonia

History
- Launched: 4 September 2006; January 2009^{again}
- Replaced: MTV Europe
- Closed: 19 November 2009
- Replaced by: MTV Europe

Links
- Website: www.mtv.lt

MTV Lithuania & Latvia was a twenty-four-hour music and entertainment channel operated by MTV Networks Europe. The channel was originally formed in September 2006 at Lithuania, at January 2009 it got re-formed to double channel including both Lithuania and Latvia and targeted audiences in Lithuania and Latvia.

== History ==
- In 2006, MTV Networks Europe established MTV Networks Baltic a new broadcasting service which provided localized channels for Latvia, Lithuania and Estonia, replacing MTV Europe in the Baltic states. MTV Networks Baltic launched three separate channels within the region in September, 2006. Initially, MTV Networks Baltic comprised MTV Latvia, MTV Lithuania and MTV Estonia. But due to financial difficulties during the Great Recession, in January 2009, MTV Networks International merged MTV Latvia and MTV Lithuania to form MTV Lithuania and Latvia.

MTV Estonia remained as stand alone channel.

- The first video to air on MTV in the Baltic region was Justice vs. Simian – "We Are Your Friends".
- In 2008, MTV Networks International signed a new licensing agreement with Israeli Communications company Ananey Communications to continue to operate and manage the MTV brand within the Baltic Region.
- The channel ceased broadcasting on 19 November 2009.
- As of 19 November 2009 MTV Europe has replaced MTV Baltic channels.
- Lithuania receives MTV Europe and other Viacom international channels, distributed by "Starworks LT".

== Channel ==
The channel combined local and international music, as well as MTV's trademark shows such as Pimp My Ride, Celebrity Deathmatch and Wildboyz which were shown with subtitles in Lithuanian. The network also aired local programmes as European Top 20, Baltic Top 20, Dance Floor Chart, MTV Oops and MTV Supermercado. Prior to closing, it had launched a reality show live from the MTV Lietuva headquarters, the humour show Baltish and Pimp My Ride Baltic were created by MTV Lietuva. Lithuanian MTV VJs are VJ Ugnė, VJ Jonas and twins VJ Artūras and VJ Robertas.

== Local shows ==
- Baltic Top 20
- Baltic Top 100 (seasonal)
- Dance Floor Chart
- Hitlist Base Chart
- Making the Video
- MTV's Most Wanted
- MTV News
- MTV Special
- Rock Chart
- Sandra
- Show Wishlist
- This Is The New S***
- Top 10 @ 10
- UK Top 10
- Wishlist
- World Chart Express

== Former local shows ==
- Baltish
- Celebrities Chart
- Ežio stažas
- MTV B-Day
- MTV News. 7 days
- MTV Oops
- MTV Rainbow
- MTV Supermercado
- Music Download Chart Top 10
- Pimp My Ride Baltic

== Pan-European shows ==
- EMA Spotlight (seasonal)
- Euro Top 20
- MTV at the Movies
- MTV EMA (seasonal)
- MTV Push
- MTV World Stage
- MTV Live Sessions

== Shows imported from MTV Networks US ==
- Beavis and Butt-Head
- Boiling Points
- Brooke Knows Best
- The City
- Dirty Sanchez
- Dismissed
- A Double Shot at Love
- Made
- MTV Cribs
- MTV Essentials
- MTV Movie Awards (seasonal)
- MTV VMA (seasonal)
- MTV's Busted
- My Super Sweet 16
- Parental Control
- The Real World
- Room Raiders
- Run's House
- True Life
- Viva La Bam
- Wildboyz
- Wonder Showzen

== Other shows ==
- Alternative Nation
- Chillout Zone
- MTV Amour
- MTV Beat
- MTV New Rave
- MTV Roulette
- MTV Flasher
- MTV Fuzz
- MTV's Breakfast Club
- Smells Like 90s
- SpongeBob SquarePants

== Other former shows ==
- The Block
- Don't Stop the Music
- Partyzone
- Popular Music
- Rise and Shine
- Superpop
- Superock

== Other projects ==
- Coca-Cola Soundwave (seasonal)
- Ežio inkubatorius
- MTV Exit
- MTV Fanwalk
- No Smoking Power
- Pradėk nuo savęs

== Change in format ==
MTV Networks Europe originally launched separate MTV channels in Lithuania (MTV Lietuva) and Latvia (MTV Latvija) in September 2006. Both channels offered a mixture of local and international content. Due to the global recession and its impact on Latvia, MTV Networks Baltic merged both channels to form MTV Lietuva & Latvija, and this channel was supposed to operate until the economic crisis is rectified. MTV Lietuva & Latvija and MTV Estonia ceased operations on November 19, 2009, and have been replaced by the original MTV Europe channel.

== VJs ==
- Mantas Stonkus
- Jonas Bačelis

== Past VJs ==
- Ugnė Skonsmanaitė
- Artūras Mediuška
- Robertas Mediuška
- DJ Sezzy
- Orinta Servaitė
- Silvija Vilkaitė
- Tomas Sinickis
- Andrius Afanasjev
- Jurgis Didžiulis
- Artūras Burnickis
