= 120 Minutes (disambiguation) =

120 Minutes is a US television program that aired on MTV and MTV2 from 1986 to 2003.

120 Minutes or 120 Mins may also refer to:

- 120 Minutes (2004 TV program), a United States television program aired on VH1 Classic and MTV Classic
- 120 Minutes (British TV programme), a European television program aired on MTV Europe and MTV Two
- 120 Minutes (film), the Malayalam-language title of the 2012 Indian film Yaarukku Theriyum
- "120 Mins", track from the album Thirteen by rock band Teenage Fanclub

== See also ==
- 102 Minutes, book about the twin towers during the September 11 attacks
