= MTV Eesti =

Television channel broadcast in Estonia

Coordinates: 59°26′18.66″N 24°45′19.88″E

- Country: Estonia
- Broadcast area: Estonia
- Headquarters: Roseni 7, Tallinn, Estonia

Ownership
- Owner: MTV Networks Europe / Ananey Communications Ltd
- Sister channels: MTV Lithuania & Latvia

History
- Launched: 4 September 2006
- Replaced: MTV Europe
- Closed: 19 November 2009
- Replaced by: MTV Europe

Links
- Website: www.mtveesti.ee

Screenshot of MTV Eesti (September 2006 – June 2009)

MTV Eesti was a twenty-four-hour music and entertainment channel operated by MTV Networks Europe. The channel began on 4 September 2006 at 22:00 EEST. The channel was available in Estonia.

== History ==
- In 2006, MTV Networks Europe established MTV Networks Baltic, a new broadcasting service which provided localized channels for Latvia, Lithuania and Estonia, replacing MTV Europe in the Baltic states. MTV Networks Baltic launched three separate channels within the region in September 2006.
- In 2008, MTV Networks International signed a new licensing agreement with Israeli Communications company Ananey Communications to operate and manage the MTV brand within the Baltic Region.
- The channel ceased broadcasting on 18 November 2009.
- As of 19 November 2009 MTV Europe has replaced MTV Baltic channels.

== VJs ==
- Piret Järvis (2007–2008)

== Channel content ==
Similar to other MTV channels in Europe. MTV Estonia featured both local and international entertainments shows.

- Alternative Nation
- Baltic Top 20
- Busted
- The City
- Chill Out Zone
- Dancefloor Chart
- A Double Shot at Love
- Euro Top 20
- Exposed
- Fist of Zen
- Futurama
- Parental Control
- Pimp My Ride
- Happy Tree Friends
- Hitlist Base Chart
- MTV Amour
- MTV Cribs
- My Super Sweet 16
- Nu Rave
- Party Zone
- Rock Chart
- Superock
- Top 10 @ 10
- UK Top 10
- World Chart Express
