= MTV Select =

- Genre: Music
- Opening theme: MTV Select Opening Theme
- Ending theme: MTV Select Ending Theme
- Countries of origin: Europe, Canada, Japan

Original release
- Release: 1 January 1996 – 10 September 2001

MTV Select was an interactive music television program airing on MTV channels across Europe and later on MTV Japan, MTV Canada, and MTV India. The show was hosted by a VJ, and viewers were able to contact the programme (using technologies like SMS) to request a music video from a list of songs chosen by the show's producers.

== History ==
MTV Select launched in 1996 after a similar series, Dial MTV, which had aired between 1986 and 1991. Upon launch MTV Select was available across Europe on MTV Europe. As MTV began to localise the channel across Europe, it launched local versions of the program, including MTV Select German, Italian, UK, and pan-European versions that aired on local MTV channels: MTV Germany, MTV UK and Ireland, MTV Italy and the original European channel MTV Europe.

The program was created during a transitional period in MTV's history when it was starting to move away from music videos into other kinds of programming, and it was said that the channel is "in search of a new identity". Shows were increasingly being centered around recognizable personalities — the UK version was led by Richard Blackwood, described as MTV's "current brightest star", and Donna Air. However only a marginal increase in viewership, from 0.9% to 1.1%, was recorded in 1998 in the UK. Regardless, toward the end of its runtime it was described in Digital Spy as "UK and Ireland's favourite music request show". MTV Select would later launch versions in Spain, France, Poland, and Romania.

MTV Networks Europe eventually replaced MTV Select with the US version of MTV TRL. Prior to MTV Select finishing MTV channels in Italy, Germany, UK and Romania already had their own versions of MTV TRL.

MTV Select appeared on MTV Japan in 2000 and was later replaced. The show was reportedly a big hit on MTV India, where the show format was to telecast live user requests, received through phone calls or e-mails. For several years since its launch it was hosted by Rahul Khanna.

With the launch of MTV Canada, a Canadian version of MTV Select aired on A-Channel, MTV Canada, and Toronto One. Hosted by Amanda MacKay and Brian Adler and taped in Vancouver, British Columbia, the show featured interviews with bands and singers, video requests, and a countdown of the ten songs that received the most votes at the Select website, starting at Number 10 on Monday and ending at Number 1 on Friday. When MTV Canada was rebranded as Razer, the show was renamed 969.

MTV was one of the early adopters of SMS use during live shows. In 2001, the program was noted as one of the ways MTV hoped to capitalize on the "text messaging mania". It was said that the benefit of the interactive format, compared to the internet, is that viewers aren't dragged away from the TV.

Today, most European MTVs no longer have live studio-based interactive request shows.

== Broadcasting ==
- MTV Select broadcast Monday to Friday on MTV Europe and later MTV Nordic from 17:00 to 18:00 (CET).
- MTV Select in the UK & Ireland broadcast Monday to Sunday from 16:00 to 18:00 (London/Dublin); later moving to weekends from 10:00 to 12:00 before the weekend edition was replaced by the short-lived MTV On Call.
- MTV Select Italia broadcast live from Milan and Rome weekdays from 16:00 to 18:00.
- MTV Spain aired Select MTV live from Madrid weekdays from 18:00 to 19:00.
- MTV Germany aired Select Germany from 14:00 (CET) each weekday.
- MTV Top Selection was the sister show to MTV Select in Europe and Nordic region; a video chart based on the most requested songs, this broadcast weekdays from 19:00 (CET).

== VJs ==
- European & Nordic Edition: Eden Harel, Thomas Madvig, Lars Oostveen, Ulrika Eriksson, Kicki Berg, Lars Beckung, Neil Cole, Fleur van der Kieft, Joanne Colan, Mimi Kalinda,
- UK & Ireland Edition: Donna Air, Richard Blackwood, Russell Brand, Garreth Hendrick, Emma Ledden, Edith Bowman, Zane Lowe, Dannan Breathnach, Lisa Snowden
- German Edition: Markus Kavka, Patrice Bouédibéla, Mirjam Weichselbraun, Nora Tschirner and Anastasia Zampounidis
- French Edition: Daniela, Guillaume Stanczyk, Mouloud, China and Ariel Wizman.
- Spanish Edition: Miguel Such & Claudia González
- Italian Edition:
- Romanian Edition: Zara.

== See also ==
- Much on Demand
- Total Request Live
