= 969 (TV series) =

- Starring: Malaika Jackson; Chris Van Vliet; Joel Herrod; Lauren Toyota
- Country of origin: Canada
- Original language: English

Production
- Producers: Malaika Jackson; Lauren Toyota; Chris Van Vliet; Joel Herrod; Jessica Reddy
- Production locations: Vancouver, BC
- Running time: about 44 minutes

Original release
- Network: Razer
- Release: November 2004

969 (formerly called MTV Select or Select) was a one-hour lifestyle magazine show. It was produced from the Citytv building in Vancouver, British Columbia. The show was hosted by Malaika Jackson, Joel Herrod, Chris Van Vliet and Lauren Toyota. Featuring interviews with bands, celebrities, and professional athletes, 969 showcased the latest in youth fashion and gave reviews of the hottest video games and movies. Through the show's website, viewers were able to make requests to see music videos. The show was officially canceled in summer of 2007. Repeats ran daily on Razer until it was rebranded as MTV2 in August 2008.

== Cast ==
- Catherine Petersen: Supervising Producer
- Joey Case: Senior Producer
- Brian Adler: Host, Producer
- Briana McIvor: Production Assistant
- Mia Jagpal: Production Assistant
- Malaika Jackson: Host, Producer
- Jason Jag Arneja: Host, Associate Producer
- Jay Ward: Production Editor
- Kimberley Dainard: Production Editor
- Dee Hambly: Photojournalist
- Adam Haisinger: Photojournalist
- Chris Van Vliet: Host, Photojournalist
- Lauren Toyota: Host, Producer
- Jessica Reddy: Host, Producer
- Joel Herrod: Host, Producer
- Andrew Worrall: Junior Associate Producer
- CJ Wallis: Junior Associate Producer
- Tyler Bradley: Host
- Matt Leaf: ENG Camera
- John Wilson: Camera Operator
- Ayma Letang: Makeup Artist
- Aaron Johnston: Makeup Artist
- Dakota Morton: Assistant Editor

== Past guests ==
- AFI
- Alexisonfire
- The All-American Rejects
- Anti-Flag
- Arctic Monkeys
- Audioslave
- Lloyd Banks
- Bedouin Soundclash
- Belly
- Billy Talent
- Black Maria
- Frank Black
- Blue October
- James Blunt
- Divine Brown
- Buck 65
- Buckcherry
- Cancer Bats
- Chamillionaire
- Champion
- Keshia Chanté
- Chingy
- Choclair
- City and Colour
- David Copperfield
- Matt Costa
- Cuff the Duke
- The Dandy Warhols
- The Dears
- Death Cab for Cutie
- Default
- Fefe Dobson
- Snoop Dogg
- Hilary Duff
- Eagles of Death Metal
- Evanescence
- Fall Out Boy
- Finger Eleven
- Five for Fighting
- Foo Fighters
- Donavon Frankenreiter
- Franz Ferdinand
- The Fray
- Nelly Furtado
- The Futureheads
- G. Love
- G-Unit
- The Game
- Teddy Geiger
- George
- Rex Goudie
- Matthew Good
- David Gray
- Dallas Green
- Tom Green
- Gym Class Heroes
- Ben Harper
- Hawthorne Heights
- Hinder
- Hot Hot Heat
- Howie D
- Hurst
- Idle Sons
- INXS
- Jack's Mannequin
- Jelleestone
- Jimmy Eat World
- Jurassic 5
- K'naan
- k-os
- Kardinal Offishall
- Karl Wolf
- Kasabian
- Keane
- Mat Kearney
- The Killers
- Jordan Knight
- Korn
- Carson Kressley
- Lady Sovereign
- Ben Lee
- Sean Lennon
- Less Than Jake
- Juliette Lewis and the Licks
- Lillix
- Live
- The Magic Numbers
- Magneta Lane
- The Marble Index
- Marianas Trench
- Ziggy Marley
- Massari
- Matt Mays
- The Meligrove Band
- Mobile
- Moneen
- Jason Mraz
- My Chemical Romance
- Bif Naked
- Neverending White Lights
- The New Pornographers
- Nickelback
- Nine Inch Nails
- NOFX
- Melissa O'Neil
- Paul Oakenfold
- Oliver Black
- Operation M.D.
- Our Lady Peace
- Panic! at the Disco
- The Philosopher Kings
- Pilate
- The Pink Spiders
- Pocket Dwellers
- Protest the Hero
- Queens of the Stone Age
- Red Jumpsuit Apparatus
- The Rentals
- Rise Against
- Sam Roberts
- Lukas Rossi
- Saukrates
- Seether
- Joey Shithead
- Simple Plan
- Sloan
- Snow Patrol
- Stabilo
- Scott Stapp
- The Stills
- Stone Sour
- Story of the Year
- The Strokes
- Switchfoot
- Swollen Members
- TV on the Radio
- Ten Second Epic
- Theory of a Deadman
- Three Days Grace
- Thursday
- Train
- The Trews
- Underoath
- Vincent Black Shadow
- We Are Scientists
- Wide Mouth Mason
- Wolfmother
- Yellowcard

== See also ==
- Razer
- MTV Select
