= From MTV to Mecca =

2012 memoir by Kristiane Backer

From MTV to Mecca: How Islam Inspired My Life
- Cover of the 2012 Arcadia Books edition
- Author: Kristiane Backer
- Language: English
- Subject: Kristiane Backer; Islam; Religious conversion
- Genre: Memoir
- Publisher: Arcadia Books
- Publication date: 2012
- Publication place: United Kingdom
- Media type: Print
- Pages: 449
- ISBN: 978-1-908129-81-9

From MTV to Mecca: How Islam Inspired My Life is a 2012 memoir by Kristiane Backer, a German former MTV Europe presenter, about her religious conversion to Islam. Published in the United Kingdom by Arcadia Books, the book recounts Backer's movement from the world of music television and celebrity culture toward Islam and Sufism.

It followed an original German book published in 2009 titled Von MTV nach Mekka: Wie der Islam mein Leben veränderte.

== Synopsis ==
The memoir begins with Backer's years as one of the earliest presenters on MTV Europe, where she became associated with European pop culture and interviewed musicians including Mick Jagger, Bono and Bob Geldof. It describes her dissatisfaction with celebrity life, her encounter with Pakistani cricketer Imran Khan, and her subsequent exposure to Pakistan and to Islamic religious practice.

Backer writes that after studying the Quran and traveling through parts of the Muslim world, she converted to Islam in a London mosque in 1995. The book follows her subsequent search for spiritual meaning, including travels through Pakistan, Bosnia, London, Hamburg and Saudi Arabia, and discusses her efforts to live openly as a European Muslim.

== Reception ==
Reviewing the book in The Muslim World Review, Ruqaiyah Hibell called it "an immensely inspiring and enthralling narrative" and praised Backer's "dignified and frank presentation" of her life experiences. Hibell wrote that the memoir effectively conveyed the emptiness Backer associated with celebrity culture while presenting her religious journey in a reflective and accessible way.
