= Rebecca de Ruvo =

Swedish TV presenter, actress, artist and model

Rebecca Anna de Ruvo is a Swedish TV presenter, actress, artist and model who is best known as host of the then new MTV Europe during the early 1990s. De Ruvo became known as the first Swedish VJ on MTV.

== Career ==
Rebecca De Ruvo started in 1981 as a voice-over artist in the Swedish Christmas series Stjärnhuset. In 1986 she appeared in an episode of the family series Julpussar och Stjärnsmällar.

De Ruvo began her television career at age nineteen as a reporter in the youth program Druvan in 1988, as her mother Annika de Ruvo was a producer for Swedish Television SVT. In 1990, she presented the chart show MTV's Braun European Top 20 and in 1991, hosted MTV Prime. Beginning 6 April 1992, she led the daily MTV Europe morning show Awake on the Wilde Side as well as the daily viewers voted charts Dial MTV. In addition, she appeared as a guest hostess and cook on MTV's Most Wanted.

De Ruvo founded the music group Breaker in London who published a few single discs on Coalition Records. In 1992, she and Staffan Ling hosted TV4's program Ring Ling where celebrities took part in various competitions. After leaving MTV, she was the host of the daily music competition Music match on TV3 with Max Lorentz in 1995-96 as a judge. Since then she has not been active in the Swedish media, save for a guest appearance in the TV series Fråga Olle in 1999.

== Personal life ==
De Ruvo is the daughter of TV producer Annika de Ruvo, who for many years worked as a TV producer at SVT's children editorial. She has five children and describes herself as a full-time parent.

In 1994, De Ruvo had a relationship with Oasis guitarist Noel Gallagher.
