= Oded Menashe =

Israeli actor and television presenter

- עודד מנשה
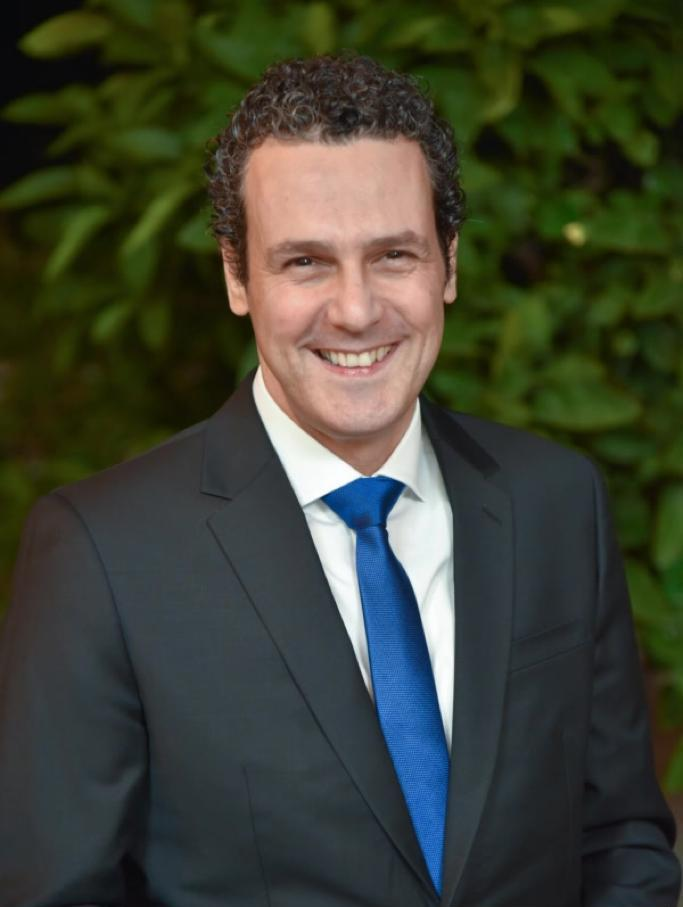
- Born: September 29, 1969 (age 56)
- Citizenship: Israel
- Occupation: Actor
- Partner: Eden Harel

Oded Menashe (Hebrew: עודד מנשה; born 29 September 1969) is an Israeli actor and television presenter.

== Biography ==
Menashe was born in Tel Aviv, to Zion and Orna Menashe. He stood out as an actor while still studying at the "Alliance" high school in Tel Aviv, and was also a trainee and guide in the Scout movement in the city.

He did his military service as a singer in the Education Corps band and as an actor in the IDF theater.

In 2024, Menashe and his wife, Eden Harel, co-hosted the International Bible Contest.

== Filmography ==
- 1992 - Inyan Shel Zman
- 1999 - Around the World in Eighty Days
- 1999 - The Sixteenth Sheep
- 2000 - Magic Hat
- 2001 - King Arthur
- 2004 - HaPijamot
- 2005 - Ringer is me
- 2007 - The champion
- 2008 - Custody
- 2011 - Sabri Maranan

== Private life ==
His spouse is the Israeli actress and former MTV Europe VJ, Eden Harel. The couple married on February 22, 2007, and have six children together. Their first son was born on January 29, 2008. They live in Ra'anana.
