= Baltish =

Lithuanian television show

Baltish is a dark comedy television show produced by MTV Lietuva. It was aired from November 2007 to January 2008 (10 episodes) by the music channels: MTV Lietuva, MTV Latvija and MTV Eesti. It is created by the Lithuanian entrepreneurs Algis Ramanauskas and Rimas Šapauskas, best known for their performances in the Radioshow, as well as other Lithuanian performers and stage actors. The presenter of the show was singer Karina Krysko from the girl group 69 Danguje.

== Setting ==
The show takes place in the fictitious post-Soviet country Baltish that corresponds to the modern territories of Latvia, Lithuania and Estonia and reflects the worst sides of their societies: antisemitism, xenophobia, sexism, homophobia and sentiments to the Soviet past. The cultures of the three Baltic states have both similarities and differences, and the creators of the show tried the humor to be understandable for all of them, by avoiding political topics and focusing of social ones.

The show is performed in "Baltish language" a kind of "broken English", i.e. the English language with heavy Eastern European accent and some ingredients of the Russian language. The name "Baltish" is a somewhat corrupt derivative from the geo-political term "Baltic states". In fact, the name of the show is the contraction of the initial idea for the name of the language: "Baltish English" (a pun on "British English") after the Lithuanian MTV channel insisted on the use of English for the show to make it understandable in the three Baltic states.

== Characters ==
The main character Budulis was created by Rimas Šapauskas in 1996 and used in his earlier TV performances. Budilis has since become a Lithuanian archetype of violent, rude, and uneducated provincial youngster inclined to criminal behaviour. He is recognizable by a blackened mouth and a track suit (Note: Tracksuits is a signature attire of anti-social subcultures in a number of post-Communist states, e.g., dresiarze in Poland, gopniks in Russia, and dizelaši in Serbia.) worn on a permanent basis. This caricaturization has acquired a cult status in Lithuanian culture and "budulis" is sometimes used in place of a common noun defining that type of a person.

The red outfitted devil named Molotov von Ribbentrop is another popular character. His name is constructed from the surnames of Vyacheslav Molotov and Joachim von Ribbentrop, signatories of Molotov–Ribbentrop Pact, which secret protocol constituted a legal basis for the occupation of the Baltic states. The devil is hilarious due to its looks as it is being acted by a woman as well as for its odd speech. It is usually armed with a trident and has no penis, which is therefore replaced by a black strap-on dildo in several series.

Česlovas also acted by Rimas Šapauskas is another character familiar from earlier TV and radio projects, including Radioshow, Orbita and Ragai. He is discernible from curly grey hair and wears glasses. He owns a cabaret which hosts funny performances and contests between representatives of the "Baltish regions" in which Lithuania sometimes prevails or there is no clear winner.

The characters act in stupid ways like Beavis and Butt-Head. Algis Ramanauskas said: "The worldview of the characters is a jumble of stereotypes formed by communism and post-communism. Xenophobia, anti-Semitism, sexism, homophobia, sentiments towards the Soviet past are in every character's mind, because every character in the show "Baltish" is an incorrigible idiot".
