= PostModern MTV =

Music TV show circa 1990

PostModern MTV is a program in the late 1980s and very early 1990s on MTV, originally hosted by Kevin Seal and later by Dave Kendall featuring such postpunk, ebm, alternative artists as PIL, The Cure, Depeche Mode, Front 242, Midnight Oil, New Order, The Jesus and Mary Chain, INXS, They Might Be Giants, Skinny Puppy, Siouxsie and The Banshees, Front Line Assembly, Sinéad O'Connor, and Love and Rockets. The show also featured interviews with guest musicians and aired Monday through Thursday from 23:30 to midnight as a weekly companion to 120 Minutes, with a slight emphasis on more mainstream alternative acts.

After the cancellation of the show, the more popular spiritual successor Alternative Nation was introduced in 1992, which followed a similar format and feel.

The MTV Europe Edition of the PostModern show was hosted by Pip Dann in the 1990s.
