= Request (broadcasting) =

A request is a frequently offered feature by some form of broadcasting entity, initially started in radio. It is an effort by the broadcaster to become interactive with its audience, allowing a means for members of the audience to ask for something specific to happen; usually the playing of a specific song.

The most common form of this is the telephone request line, where listeners are encouraged to call a specific telephone number to a radio station to give their request. Disk jockeys then would use various forms of identifying that the song they were about to play had been requested, either by playing a jingle to that effect, mentioning the requester by name, playing back a recording of the request phone call or even taking the request live on the air. Many disk jockeys have built their entire act and reputation around their method of dealing with requests. Similarly radio stations have built their format around taking requests. Some stations have even billed themselves as "All Request Radio" which frequently results in them playing the current top 40 or other patterns of most popular songs, interspersed with old songs.

As technologies have advanced, both the methods of the broadcaster accepting the request and the form the broadcast entity distributes its content have changed.

Anticipated by the success of some local TV stations, MTV took the concept to the broader television market with Dial MTV and subsequently the long running Total Request Live.

Tallies of the number of requests (for specific items) are frequently kept as that is an indicator of what is popular or a set period of time. Many radio stations have published weekly surveys and based entire components of their programming on the statistics of the requests they receive. Since 2012, Billboard magazine has kept track of On-Demand Songs as one of three components of the Billboard Hot 100.
