= 120 Minutes (British TV programme) =

120 Minutes is a European music television programme that was broadcast nightly at 1am on MTV Two. In the tradition of the American show of the same name, it showcased music videos from "the newest, most innovative acts in rock, left field and electronic music".

In the United Kingdom and the rest of Europe, 120 Minutes was originally featured on MTV Europe from 1990, hosted during its first years by VJ and ex-popstar Paul King and, from 1994 on, by Wonder Stuff frontman Miles Hunt. It disappeared in late June 1995, but was replaced by a similar show, Alternative Nation, which was shown on MTV Europe on Tuesday nights at midnight CET (the same timeslot it has had since July 1995) until July 2010. 120 Minutes returned in 2003 to MTV2 Europe (now MTV Two), replacing a similar show, 2eclectic, which had sporadically occupied various late-night slots.

== Format ==
The format of the show on MTV Two was different from the original United States programme and the show's previous incarnation on MTV Europe in that there were no VJs, commercial breaks, or MTV promotions. The only interruptions came in the form of an ident that played after every four videos. The two-hour strand concentrated on playing 'the real alternative', including new and classic left field indie, rock, electronica, hip-hop and avantgarde videos that may not have been played on other channels or during the daytime, although some videos were also played on the channel's Spanking New Music slots during the day.

Artists such as Franz Ferdinand, Kaiser Chiefs, and Bloc Party were first played on this show before they achieved commercial success, and many videos were played on 120 Minutes before branching out onto the MTV2 playlist. Regular artists on 120 Minutes also included The Fall, The Knife, Pavement, Sonic Youth, My Bloody Valentine, Kraftwerk and Björk.

MTV2 Europe have also aired many themed shows, including artist specials that played half-hour or two-hour discographies of certain artists including Björk, Kraftwerk and Hexstatic among others, as well as shows curated by people such as Franz Ferdinand, the Drowned in Sound team and Kitsuné Musique and specials from the Triptych festival.

== Themes ==
During 2005 and most of 2006, special themed 120 Minutes shows were aired: 120 Electronic Minutes on Tuesdays, 120 Pioneers on Thursdays, and 120 Metal Minutes on Fridays.

=== 120 Metal Minutes ===
For about a year (2004–2005), MTV2 Europe ran a show named 120 Metal Minutes – a show which, like the title suggests, was two hours of heavy metal songs accompanied by their music videos. Regularly played bands included Pantera, The Dillinger Escape Plan, Alice in Chains, Mastodon, Slayer and Lamb of God. Over time, there was a noticeable change in the type of bands the show was supporting – often going as far as playing post-hardcore bands such as Funeral for a Friend or Alexisonfire. Shortly after the change of the show's style, ratings started to decline. Eventually, the show was cancelled and replaced with a UK version of Headbangers Ball during early 2006, which consisted of one hour of back-to-back music videos. The show occasionally featured interview footage and music videos.

== Time slot ==
The original time slot was on a Saturday night at 1 a.m. GMT, with the show being repeated on a Thursday at 2 a.m. From March 2005, the decision was made for 120 Minutes to be shown every night at 1 a.m. in addition to the 2 a.m. slot on Saturdays. In February 2006, the show moved forward to 12 a.m. every night (commercial breaks were inserted in the first hour of the show), with a 120 Taster, showcasing some of the videos played in the strand at an earlier time of 8 p.m. Since September 2006, the show has been pushed back once again to the 01.00 – 03.00 a.m. slot, running again without commercial breaks.

== Cancellation ==
In January 2009, it appeared that 120 Minutes was being dropped from MTV2's schedule. The move prompted much criticism of MTV's decision, and an online campaign to try to save the show.
