= International Bible Contest =

Worldwide competition on the Jewish Bible

The International Bible Contest (Hebrew: חידון התנ"ך; Hidon HaTanakh also spelled Chidon HaTanach or Jidon Hatanaj [among Spanish and Portuguese-speaking Jews]) is a worldwide competition on the Tanakh (Jewish Bible) for middle school and high school Jewish students. It is held annually in Jerusalem, on Yom Ha'atzmaut. Because the event is officially sponsored by the Israeli government and the Jewish Agency, it is attended by the Prime Minister of Israel, the Minister of Education and the Chairman of the Jewish Agency.

== History ==
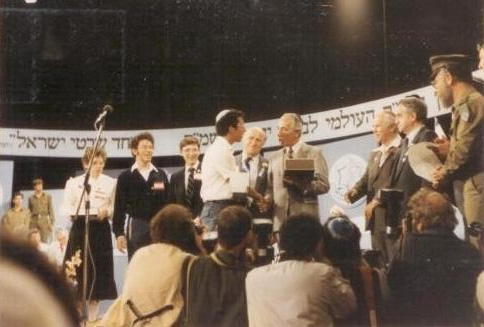
Shimon Peres greets the winner of the International Bible Contest in 1985, on Yom Ha'Atzmaut.

The international contest was founded by David Ben-Gurion. Originally, a Chidon Hatanach for adults was the main contest, and the contest for high school students was a relatively minor part. The Chidon for adults returned again in 2010.

From 1988, Avshalom Kor hosted the International Bible Contest. In 2016, Sivan Rahav-Meir won the tender to host the contest, but gave it up. Kor received the notification of his loss in the tender by text message. Ultimately, Guy Zu-Aretz moderated the contest that year. Between 2017–2021, Kor returned to host the contest. In 2022, Ofer Hadad was chosen to become the new host for that year. In 2023, Guy Zu-Aretz returned to host the contest. In 2024, Oded Menashe and Edan Harel were selected as the co-hosts of the contest. Since 2025, Sarah Beck has been the host of the international Chidon.

== Questions ==
One of the formats of the questions is completing a Bible verse. For example:

“The king establishes the land by justice.”
“But he who receives bribes overthrows it”, Proverbs 29:4 (2013 contest).
“Where there is no revelation, the people cast off restraint.”
“But happy is he who keeps the law.”, Proverbs 29:18 (2013 contest).

== Regional contests ==
=== Mexico ===
Participants of each school are given a list of chapters to study from October to February, when the first round takes place in the Universidad Hebraica, everyone can participate from his or her school, but after the 50 question exam, only around 16 people will survive for the next round, this one takes place a few days later, in this case, the 16 winners go to the school of the person who won the last year, where the points of the first round are not erased and where they are given a Passuk with 2 questions (8 points each), and after that a page with 10 questions (8 out of 10 worth 2 points each, and the other 2 worth 4 points), at the end the 3 people with the highest score go to Israel.

=== Canada ===
Participants are given a list of chapters to study in May or June, and in the following February or March a preliminary regional test is taken. This consists of 100 multiple-choice questions for high school students (75 for grades 7 and 8, 50 for grades 5 and 6). A number of participants to continue are selected - e.g., 50. In this case, the top 50 scores will continue to the national competition. The national competition is held in April or May. It consists of 100 multiple-choice questions, followed by three rounds of short-answer questions (first a round for all participants, then a two-part top ten Semifinal round, then the top five Final round). The top 10 people are selected. Of these, first and second place will go to Israel the next year to represent Canada. If the top two are from the same region of Canada, then the highest-ranking participant from another region (i.e. Quebec, Western Canada, Ontario) will also go, provided that contestant ranked in the top ten. If there are Israelis in Canada who are participating, they are not allowed to win, but the top Israeli in the top 10 goes to Israel as the Chatan Yisrael of Canada. Thus, a total of 5 people at the most could theoretically go to Israel the next year. In reality, it is usually only 3 or 4.

=== United States ===
Participants are also given a set of chapters to study. There is one book of Torah, one in Early Prophets, and one in Writings. The high school division also has one book of Later Prophets. Selected chapters are chosen from each, for a total of 70-100 chapters. During December, February, and March, there are 3 regional tests. Every school, along with several other schools, are assigned a region. The student who scores the highest score in his/her region is crowned "Regional Champion". The Regional Champion along with those who score a certain cumulative percentage (e.g. 85%) on the regionals go on to the nationals. There are 3 divisions in the nationals, the Hebrew High School, Hebrew Middle School, and English Grades 6-11. The US Chidon sends 4 contestants to Israel, with the Jewish Agency paying for the contestants' plane tickets. Three spots go to the first-place winner from every division to Israel. If there is a tie for first place in any one division, then all four spots go to the four first-place winners. Otherwise, the judges calculate which division's second-place winner answered the highest percentage of correct answers on his/her written test. After tallying the scores of the written exam and video rounds, the 2nd-place winner of that division wins the final spot in Israel. The 2012 and 2013 finals were held at Yeshiva University. The 2014 and 2015 finals were held at Manhattan Day School.

The National Finals' written test is divided into two sections. First there is a test similar to the regional test, which asks questions such as "Who said this to whom", "Who is this talking about" and understanding the text. After this test, there is a second test called the cross-referencing test. Similar phrases in Tanach are given and contestants must be able to match up one side to the other. Family trees and finishing the phrases are also on this part of the test. Following the written test, contestants eat lunch while judges grade the written exams. After lunch, approximately 10 to 15 top scorers from the written exams are called to the front of the auditorium to answer several more written questions which are presented in video format. After the judges combine each contestant's written score with his/her score from the video round, the winners are announced.

In a typical year, between 350 and 400 students take the preliminary exams. Of these, approximately 185 students travel to New York to compete in the national finals. In 2026 there were 699 participants with 325 making it to the national finals.

=== Australia ===
In Australia, there are three competitions leading up to the International Bible Contest; the school test( top 3 go through, the state test (top 2 go through) and the federal test (top 2 in Australia go to the Israeli test). Competitors usually come from Melbourne, Victoria and Sydney, New South Wales, though in recent years participants from Perth in Western Australia have taken part. A national round consisting of the participants of each state (usually between 4-8 participants) sit a 1-hour written test and then a 2-hour public oral quiz, where participants sit on a stage and project their answers after hearing questions. Identical quizzes are sat by the participants in each state. The national syllabus usually consists of 100-150 chapters of Torah, Neviim and Later Prophets. The top three participants of the national quiz of each state are then selected to go through to the federal round, held either in Sydney or Melbourne. A further 50-70 chapters are then added to the initial national syllabus. The Federal round of the competition is identical to the National only there is more content, thus the questions are seemingly harder. The winner and the 2nd highest scorer are then given places at the International Bible Quiz camp. Only the winner's ticket is paid for by the Zionist Federation of Australia. The 2nd-place winner must pay for his or her ticket to come to the camp. The author of the Australian Bible Quiz is the 1999 Diaspora Winner, Dr Shira Wenig.

=== United Kingdom ===
The British contest varies from year to year. The international final is held at LSJS in London. In some schools, the top scorers go through to the final but most schools let all teams compete. The topics are given approximately 6 months in advance, however the topics for 2014 were given to pupils at the beginning of September allowing the contestants 2 months to learn. The syllabus contains all of the Torah and some of Neviim and Ketuvim. The winning team (of 3-4) all go to Israel.

== See also ==
- Culture of Israel
