= Radioshow =

Lithuanian black comedy radio and TV show

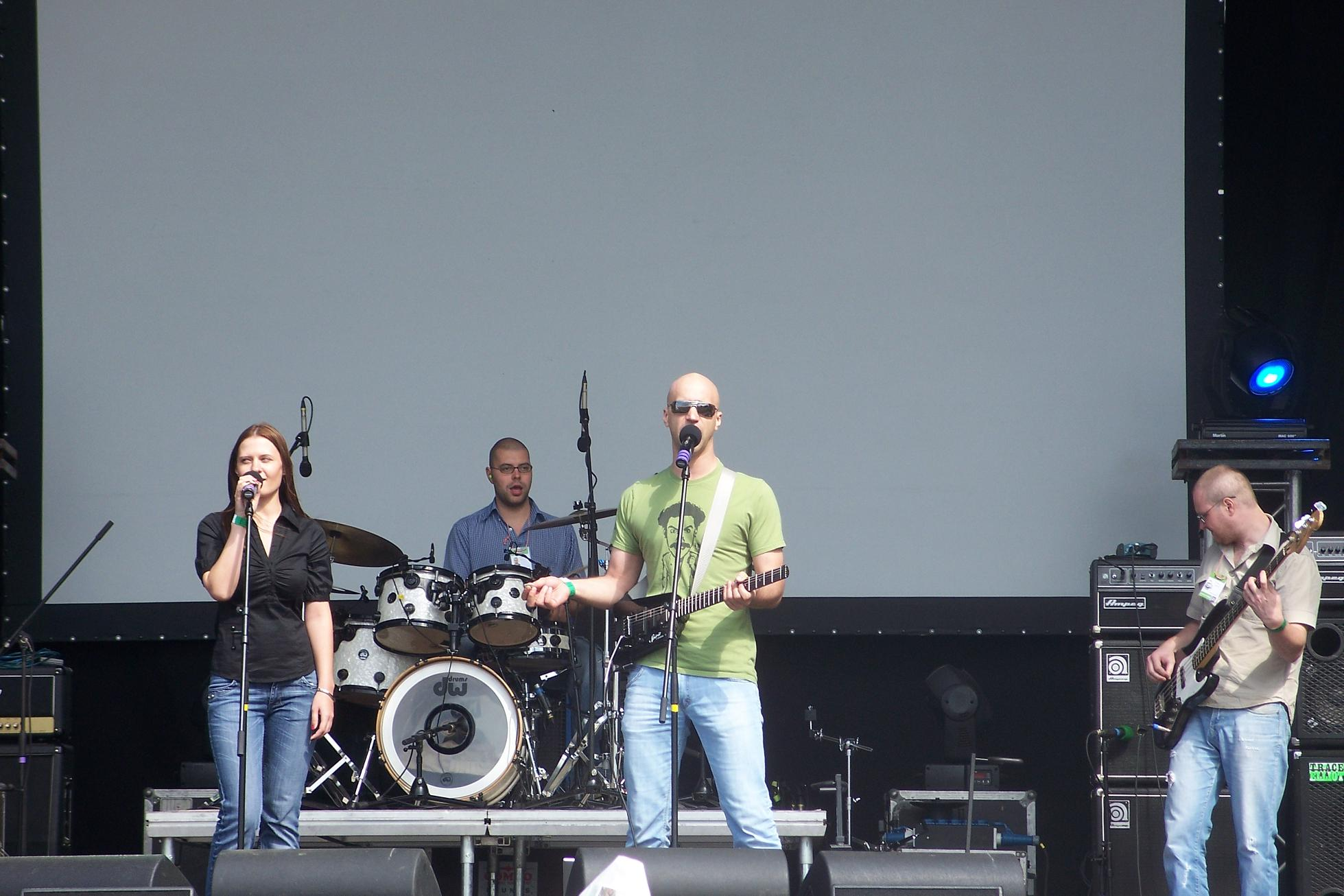
A picture of the Radioshow group

Radioshow is а cult Lithuanian black comedy radio and TV show hosted by Algis Ramanauskas and Rimas Šapauskas. It is also the name of their humorous rock band. Radioshow has started at radio station Radiocentras in 1992. Later it has moved to the radio station Ultra Vires. In 1995 Radioshow debuted as a comedy puppet show on TV at LNK station. From 1997 till 1999 Radioshow was running at BTV TV station. In 2004 it briefly ran on Vilnius radio station Užupio radijas before being shut down, because of swearing on the air. However the show was immediately picked up by the regional radio station Vox Maris.

== Controversy ==
Because of the constant taboo breaking, swearing and making fun of the symbols of national pride, Radioshow was often criticized by the conservative media and the older generation. Music critic Viktoras Gerulaitis has stated, that "These guys are sowing the seed of Satan, and it seems there is no-one that could stop them". This quote was later sampled into the song by Algis Ramanauskas' band Svastikos Sukitės Greitai. It is ironic, that today Algis Ramanauskas is a member of the conservative Homeland Union party. Another controversy was caused in 1995 by the obscene album Unplugged attributed to Radioshow. However Algis Ramanauskas denied his authorship and claimed, that it was a bootleg made by the imitators.

== Characters ==
=== Main characters ===
==== Bronius ====
Bronius is approaching retirement age and is full of sentiments to the Soviet era. He often refers to programming of the Russian TV and Belarusian radio and television. He is annoyed by modern Lithuania - he has some command of English but uses it mostly to communicate disgust with all things Western. Bronius has a dirty mind and a dirty mouth and enjoys sexual innuendo and filthy fantasies, particularly those involving TV celebrities, which he describes with considerable inspiration and lewd detail. Bronius is a character voiced by Algis Greitai.

==== Česlovas ====
Česlovas is a former teacher. Česlovas' looks resemble former speaker of the Lithuanian Parliament social democrat Česlovas Juršėnas. This character is married and has two daughters (Sigutė and Akvilė), but despite that he often displays random acts of latent homosexuality, as the most of Radioshow characters do. Česlovas is voiced by Rimas Šapauskas.

==== Albinas ====
Albinas, also referred to as Senis (English: Old man), is a 100-year-old man of far-right nationalistic beliefs. His claim that he was born in the mountains of Scotland is a reference to the TV series The Highlander. Albinas makes frequent references to his pre-war memories.

==== Zbygniewas ====
Zbygniewas is a character of Polish ethnicity, speaking Lithuanian with a heavily inflicted Russian accent. Zbygniewas claims to hail from Nemenčinė, a town near capital Vilnius with large predominance of Polish, Belarusian and Russian population. In his younger days he was a hippie and used to read Kafka. His career included a stint at as a communal heating boiler attendant, a choice occupation for rebellious intellectuals in the former Soviet Union, and also at a mortuary, which involved a sexual encounter with a dead female body, which Zbygniewas discusses with great reluctance. He is voiced by Algis Ramanauskas-Greitai.

==== Igorj ====
Russian speaking character voiced by Rimas Šapauskas.

==== Mindaugas, later - Budulis ====
Coarse-voiced, aggressive young Lithuanian gangster guided by values and rules of Russian prison life ("paniatkes") and making frequent references to his encounters with the law enforcement authorities. This character underwent some changes and is currently known as Budulis. He is discernible from a blackened mouth and a track suit worn on a permanent basis. In later episodes of the show, Budulis makes references to his work as a labourer in Ireland. (voiced by Rimas Šapauskas)

==== Filadelfijus ====
Filadelfijus is a young incompetent journalist. His name originates from a motion picture title Philadelphia. In the beginning he was speaking in a high-pitched voice, hinting that he might be homosexual. However, in the later shows unprofessional babbling and not the allusions to his homosexuality became his distinctive mark. Filadelfijus is voiced by Rimas Šapauskas.

=== Minor characters ===
Mindė - nationalist character (animated pig's head); Vanga - Bulgarian prophetess (animated portrait of Lithuanian writer Žemaitė, taken from one Litas banknote); Dujokaukė Kiulamae - Estonian character always speaking derogaratively about the Lithuanians (his name translates into English from Lithuanian as "Gas Mask" and the surname is of the former BC Žalgiris Estonian basketball player Gert Kullamäe; Slavik from Maladzechna; Almantas, a gay type.

== Discography ==
- 1996 Plugged
- 2001 Underground
- 2001 Raštai
- 2005 Kronikos #1
- 2005 Kronikos #2

== See also ==
- Baltish
