= 120 Minutes (2004 TV program) =

- Also known as: The Alternative; VH1 Classic 120 Minutes
- Country of origin: United States

Production
- Running time: 120 minutes

Original release
- Network: VH1 Classic (2004–2016); MTV Classic (2016–present)
- Release: August 20, 2004 – present

120 Minutes (formerly The Alternative and VH1 Classic 120 Minutes) is an alternative rock music video program that debuted in August 2004 on VH1 Classic and currently airs on MTV Classic. The program follows a similar format to that of 120 Minutes, which aired on MTV from 1986 to 2003.

Following VH1 Classic's transition into MTV Classic on August 1, 2016, VH1 Classic 120 Minutes was relaunched under the name 120 Minutes on August 8, 2016. It was one of several VH1 Classic original programs to be retained by MTV Classic.

== Time slot ==
The Alternative aired in a two-hour version early Sunday mornings at 11 with a repeat at 11 pm Eastern, with additional one-hour shows at those times on Wednesdays and Thursdays. Beginning the weekend of April 28, 2007, The Alternative was renamed 120 Minutes in honor of the classic MTV series of the same name. The series aired that weekend from 4-6 am and 1-3 am early Saturday mornings, and Sunday evenings at 9-11 pm and 1-3 am. Until August 2016, 120 Minutes aired from 4-6 am, usually on Sundays, Mondays and Thursdays. Ever since the network re-branded as MTV Classic, it airs with no host on Saturday/Sunday and Sunday/Monday from 12-2 am US Eastern time.

== See also ==
- Alternative Nation
