= Dancefloor Chart =

The Dancefloor Chart (originally the Dance Floor Chart Show) is a chart show on MTV Europe that played the ten most popular dance songs in Europe. It plays all different kinds of genres, from trance to house, garage to techno, breakbeat to drum and bass etc.

The original chart show that was a top 10 was doubled to a top 20 countdown in June 1998 and was sponsored by Reebok. British comedian Russell Brand started his presenting career on Dancefloor Chart, touring clubs in London and Ibiza.

The top 20 chart was reduced to a top 10 in April 2004. The show was cancelled in July 2010 but continued to be broadcast on MTV Europe with a different compilation method up until its complete termination in August 2012. As of January 1, 2013 the Dancefloor chart was back on MTV Europe.

The show would also air in the UK on MTV UK and MTV Dance, although usually featuring a different chart. It has more recently been replaced with The Official Dance Chart.
