= Euro Top 20 =

Music chart countdown on MTV Hits Europe

- Also known as: MTV European Top 20
- Country of origin: Europe

Production
- Running time: 60 mins / 120 mins

Original release
- Network: MTV Europe
- Release: 1988

The MTV Euro Top 20 (previously known as the MTV European Top 20) is a music chart show on MTV Europe that played Europe's most popular songs and artists. The original format of the show had been shown on the majority of the regional MTV channels in Europe and aired from 1988 until 2009. Variations of the chart still exist today though with new titles such as the MTV Euro Top Chart, Euro Hitlist or MTV Top 20. Although the chart exists on various local MTV channels across Europe, the music aired is largely adapted to the music scene of those regions and thus not a pan-European chart as was originally intended.

== History ==
The show was first launched on MTV Europe in 1988 as a two-hour music countdown show titled MTV European Top 20 and presented by a selection of MTV Europe VJ's. In October 2003, the show was rebranded as MTV Euro Top 20. The show was discontinued in April 2009. During these years the show was sponsored by Braun, Coca-Cola, Memorex and Maxell.

After the cancellation in 2009, the show was relaunched as Euro Hitlist on MTV Europe and shown with a varying compilation method until its complete termination in August 2012. In 2014, the show re-emerged as MTV Euro Top Chart (airing every Friday and Sunday on MTV Europe) in some territories whereas in others it remained as MTV Euro Top 20. Another adaption of the chart aired on MTV Music Polska until the channel was shut down. MTV Euro Top 20 continues to air on MTV Italy's digital channels. MTV European Top 20 also had localised versions on MTV France and MTV Germany available in local languages and presented by local MTV VJ's.

In 2021 the show was relaunched as a weekly music countdown on the pan-European version of MTV Hits on Mondays, Wednesdays, Fridays and Saturdays at 17:00 (CET). The show airs as MTV Euro Top Chart on MTV Norway, Sweden, Denmark and Finland every Sunday from 05:00. The show airs on MTV Europe on Saturdays at 08.40 (CET) and Sundays at 05:00 (CET).

== Former Presenters ==
- Ray Cokes (1980s)
- Paul King (1990s)
- Pip Dann (1990s)
- Maiken Wexø (1990s)
- Marijne van der Vlugt (1990s)
- Rebecca de Ruvo (1990s)
- Simone Angel (1990s)
- Maria Guzenina (1990s)
- Lisa I'Anson (1990s)
- Hugo de Campos (1990s)
- Davina McCall (1990s)
- Kristiane Backer (1990s)
- Eden Harel (1995–2000)
- Nikolai (1990s)
- Kimsy von Reischach (1990s)
- Boris (1990s)
- Kicki Berg (1999)
- Trey Farley (1999–2000)
- Neil Cole (2000–2002)
- Joanne Colan (2000–2003)
- Ina Geraldine (2003–2004)
- Amelia Hoy (2004–2005)
- Charlotte Thorstvedt (2005–2009)
