= Chris Van Vliet =

Canadian television journalist (born 1983)

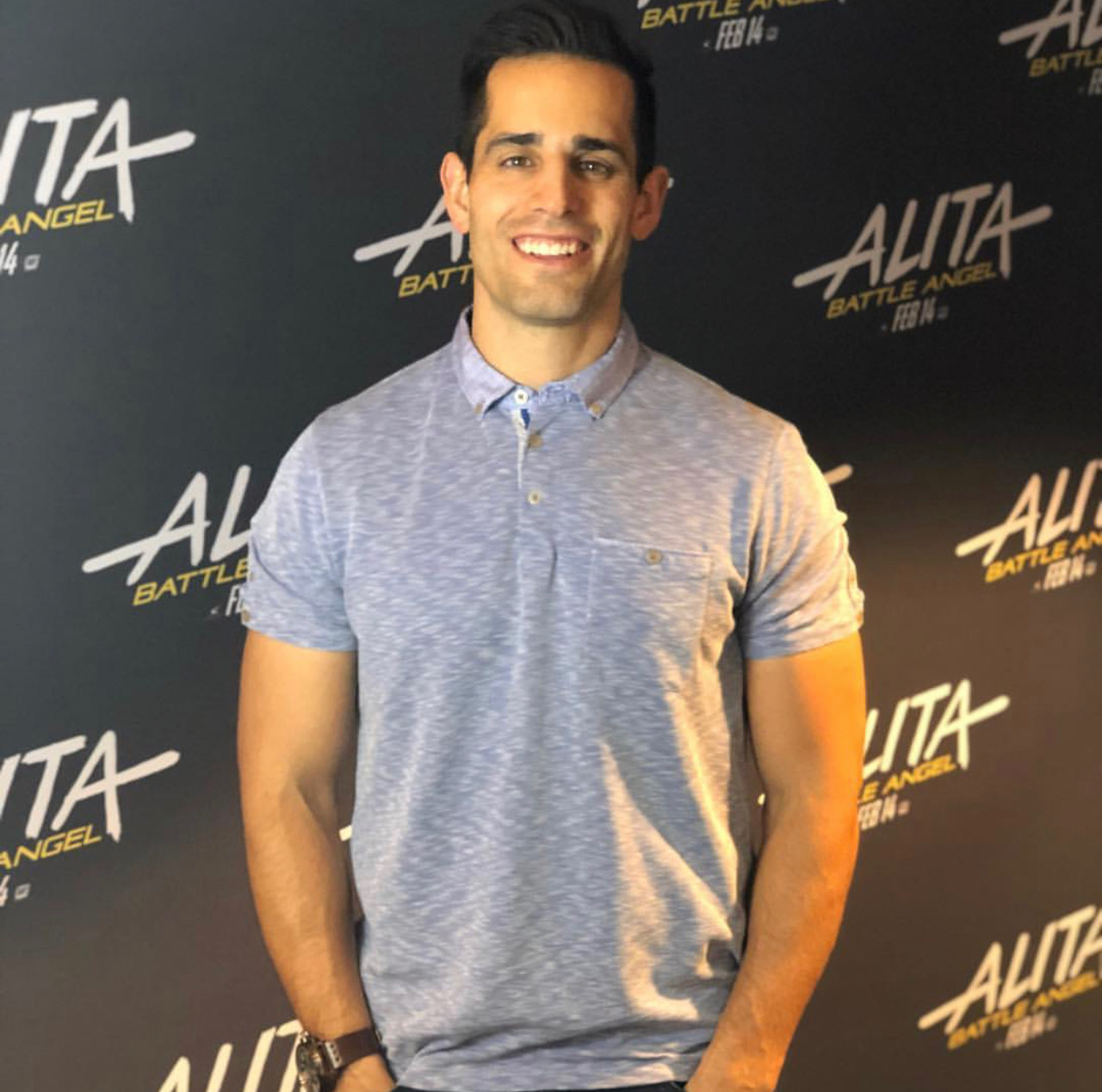
- Van Vliet in 2019
- Born: Christopher Van Vliet; May 19, 1983 (age 43); Pickering, Ontario, Canada
- Education: Wilfrid Laurier University
- Occupations: Television and radio personality; YouTuber; journalist
- Years active: 2005–present
- Height: 5 ft 10 in (178 cm)
- Spouse: Rachel Van Vliet (m. 2022)
- Children: 2

YouTube information
- Channels: Chris Van Vliet; CVV CLIPS
- Genres: Entertainment; professional wrestling; vlog
- Subscribers: 882 thousand (Chris Van Vliet); 1.28 million (CVV CLIPS)
- Views: 543.2 million (Chris Van Vliet); 3.38 billion (CVV CLIPS)
- Last updated: November 10, 2026
- Website: chrisvanvliet.com

Christopher Van Vliet (born May 19, 1983) is a Canadian television and radio personality and YouTuber. He was born and raised in Pickering, Ontario.

He is an entertainment reporter for FOX affiliate WSVN in Miami on the show Deco Drive. Prior to coming to Miami, he worked at WOIO in Cleveland and was a radio personality on WDOK. He is also known for his work in his native Canada as the former co-host of the Sun TV show Inside Jam! and the co-host of Razer's (now MTV2) 969 program.

Van Vliet serves as a member of the Critics Choice Association, and runs a YouTube channel bearing his name where he interviews celebrities and wrestling personalities. He has briefly worked for All Elite Wrestling (AEW) as a backstage interviewer on Dynamite. He is also the host of Insight with Chris Van Vliet, a weekly podcast featuring interviews with professional wrestling personalities.

== Early life and education ==
Van Vliet was born in Pickering, Ontario, where he attended Pine Ridge Secondary School. He attended Wilfrid Laurier University in Waterloo, Ontario, where he completed the university's communication studies program. While attending he held jobs at Rogers Community Television and AM570 News in Kitchener. His first on-air job was with CHEX-TV in Peterborough, Ontario, where he was a news reporter and videographer immediately following graduation. He is of Dutch and Macedonian descent.

== Career ==
=== 969 ===
Following his early days in Peterborough, Van Vliet eventually moved to Vancouver, British Columbia, where he was hired as a host and producer for Razer Television's (what would eventually become MTV2) 969 program. 969 aired from November 2004 until it was cancelled in 2007. While there, he also hosted Razer News, a celebrity news program. In 2007, Van Vliet was voted as the third favorite Vancouver TV personality by the readers of TV Week Magazine.

=== Inside Jam! ===
Following 969, Van Vliet returned to Toronto where he co-hosted the program Inside Jam! with Tara Slone on Sun TV. While the program was initially an hour-long daily entertainment news program, on March 23, 2006, it was reported that the program was moving to a 1-hour Saturday format. Inside Jam! was then scaled down to a half-hour program on Saturdays and Sundays.

=== WOIO ===
In February 2010, Van Vliet announced on air on Inside Jam! that he would be leaving the show, having accepted a position as an entertainment reporter at CBS affiliate WOIO in Cleveland, Ohio. In April 2010 he was voted by Inside Edition as one of Cleveland's hottest bachelors.

In October 2011, Cosmopolitan Magazine named him the Bachelor of the Year. He donated the $10,000 prize to the Boys & Girls Clubs of Cleveland.

On June 2, 2012, Van Vliet won two Sports Emmy Awards for Best Host and Best Single Sports Story for his report on Gregory Iron, a professional wrestler from Cleveland who wrestles despite being born with cerebral palsy.

On June 7, 2014, Van Vliet won his third Sports Emmy Award for Best Host.

=== WSVN ===
Van Vliet had joined WSVN as the entertainment reporter for WSVN's nightly program Deco Drive on January 5, 2015. On January 29, 2016, Van Vliet interviewed Leslie Mann and Dakota Johnson for the film How to Be Single. The interview subsequently became a viral video after the actresses spent the entire time aggressively flirting with Van Vliet. He then left the station at September 30, 2019.

On June 27, 2015, Van Vliet won his fourth Emmy Award for Best Host. He has a total of nine nominations.

=== Podcast ===
In June 2019, Van Vliet launched his own podcast show Insight with Chris Van Vliet, which features interviews with prominent professional wrestling personalities. In 2025, he joined Westwood One/Cumulus Media as his show became part of Cumulus's podcast network.

== Outside interests ==
=== Bass fishing ===
In addition to his media work, Van Vliet also is involved with competitive bass fishing, having entered numerous Bassmaster and FLW Outdoors tournaments, and winning an Amateur Division Big Fish of the Day title when the Bassmaster Northern Open took place from September 12–14, 2013 in Sandusky, Ohio, with a 6-pound, 7-ounce smallmouth bass. He also has recorded two overall top ten finishes in previous Bassmaster Northern Opens. He is the co-founder of the outdoors brand WOO! Tungsten.

=== Professional wrestling ===
Van Vliet is an avid professional wrestling fan, having trained as a professional wrestler while in college under Rob Fuego alongside fellow trainees Angelina Love and Traci Brooks. He also worked as an announcer for Cleveland-based independent promotion Prime Wrestling, Blueprint Pro Wrestling in Deerfield Beach, Florida, as well as several companies in Toronto. He frequently conducts interviews with professional wrestlers from national companies such as WWE, All Elite Wrestling (AEW) and Total Nonstop Action (TNA) for his popular YouTube channel. He announced on July 29, 2019, that he had signed with AEW as a backstage interviewer for the organization's weekly television show AEW Dynamite on TNT. Van Vliet was featured as a ring side interviewer on the premiere episode of Dynamite with actors Kevin Smith and Jason Mewes and also appeared on a later episode hosting a live interview segment with The Rock 'n' Roll Express in Charleston, West Virginia.

== Personal life ==
Van Vliet married Rachel Linn on December 17, 2022. They have two children.

== Awards ==
- Canadian Pro-Wrestling Hall of Fame
  - Class of 2025
- Four-time Lower Great Lakes Emmy Awards recipient
- 2011 Cosmopolitan Magazine Bachelor of the Year
- 2012 Broadcasters Hall of Fame Personality of the Year
- 2012, 2013 Society of Professional Journalists Best of Ohio Award recipient
- 2013, 2014 Ohio Excellence in Journalism award recipient
- 2013 Bassmaster Bass Pro Shops Northern Open - Amateur Division Big Fish of the Day (6lb., 7oz. smallmouth bass)
