= Wanted (game show) =

British game show

- Created by: Greg Forrest
- Presented by: Richard Littlejohn (1996); Ray Cokes (1997)
- Country of origin: United Kingdom
- Original language: English
- No. of series: 2
- No. of episodes: 16

Production
- Producer: Hewland International
- Running time: 60 minutes

Original release
- Network: Channel 4
- Release: 30 October 1996 – 22 June 1997

Wanted was a British 1990s game show on Channel 4, although more similar to modern reality television than the classic gameshow format. Conceptually, it was similar to an advanced game of hide and seek. It is also somewhat similar to the game show featured in Stephen King's novel The Running Man.

== Format ==
It entailed three teams of two runners travelling throughout Great Britain (travel to other areas of the UK, including British islands, and Northern Ireland, was banned) on the run from a Tracker (one of whom was David McBride), with limited funds available for their travel and upkeep. For every day they managed to travel at least one square of the British national grid reference system, take a ten-minute video diary, complete a task of some description, and avoid being spotted by their tracker; the team received £1,000. Every morning, their tracker was told where they had spent the previous night. The public were encouraged to phone in information to the trackers, but natural sympathy with the runners made information somewhat sparse and in the second series a bribe of a £1,000 reward was added to encourage people to phone in. The runners themselves could, and did, arrange for their friends and family to send in false leads.

At the end of every week, the runners had to spend 1 hour in a specific phone box of their own choice, connected by video link to a central studio, while their Tracker attempted to find them live on air. The tracker was told which grid square on the map the runners were in. If the door of the phone box was opened by the tracker, the runners were eliminated; if not, even if the Tracker managed to see them but not open the door of the phone box, they won the prize for that week.

== Series ==
Two series of the show were produced, one in 1996 and one in 1997. The first, more serious series featured Richard Littlejohn as presenter, and a former KGB double agent Oleg Gordievsky as a co-host and analyst. The second series, which had its in-studio content lightened slightly, was presented by Ray Cokes, with commentary provided by Magenta Devine. Both series lasted for 8 weeks of 1 hour shows. The rules were slightly altered in the second series, allowing the Tracker to bribe the Runners on the final show of the week. Trackers featured on the show included: Paul Denchfield, Victoria Fay, David McBride, John McMahon, Sarah Odell (who later became a contestant on Survivor:Pulau Tiga), Matthew Randall and Andy Stewart (who was a successful runner in the first series).

While the series was popular, it was also extremely expensive to run – videophone links, camcorders and mobile phone technology all being extremely costly technology in 1997; and the cost of paying the "bribes" for information from the public as well as other logistical challenges mounted, so a third series was not commissioned.

The format was also hampered by the broadcast schedule differences between Channel 4 and S4C, - the channel that aired in Wales instead of Channel 4. S4C's evening schedule at the time consisted of mostly Welsh language programmes, and it was common for S4C to broadcast Channel 4 programmes later or not at all. Live TV shows also suffered so while some episodes of Wanted aired just half hour later, it wasn't uncommon for S4C to show episodes several days later, so any contestants hiding in Wales were pretty much immune from being spotted by viewers.

== International versions ==
The format was sold internationally, with ABC spending $2 million on a pilot series (which did not air) in the United States.

The Swedish version was called På rymmen ("On the run"). Three seasons of this version were broadcast by TV4 during 1997–1999. The Argentine version was called Fugitivos. Two seasons of this version were broadcast by Telefe during 2000–2001. A Dutch version called Tros Wanted, broadcast by TROS, had only one season in 1997.
