= Lauren Toyota =

Canadian television personality

- Born: Mississauga, Ontario, Canada
- Education: Durham College
- Occupations: Cookbook author, food blogger
- Writing career
- Subject: Vegan cookbooks
- Notable works: Hot for Food Vegan Comfort Classics: 101 Recipes to Feed Your Face (2018); Hot for Food All Day: Easy Recipes to Level Up Your Vegan Meals (2021)
- Website: www.hotforfoodblog.com

Lauren Toyota is a Canadian vegan cookbook author, blogger and former television personality. She is the creator of the blog Hot for Food.

== Early life and education ==
Toyota was born and raised in Mississauga, Ontario, Canada. She is a Yonsei Japanese Canadian. Her great-grandparents emigrated from Japan to Canada, and her grandparents were in internment camps during WWII.

Toyota became a vegetarian when she was 12 and had to cook her own food. In 2003, she graduated from Durham College with a degree in Music Business Management.

== Career ==
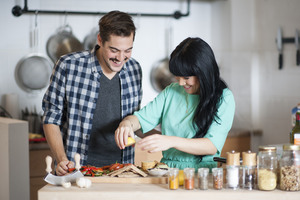
Lauren Toyota and John Diemer, "Hot For Food," 2013

Toyota began her career in Canadian Television, as a host for MTV Canada, a former MuchMusic VJ, and a co-host of 969. In 2014, she gave up her work in television, in order to develop her vegan blog and YouTube channel, Hot for Food. Canada's Impact magazine listed Toyota as one (out of 12) of "Canada's Top Vegan Influencers."

Food & Wine named her 2021 cookbook Hot for Food All Day: Easy Recipes to Level Up Your Vegan Meals, as one of "The 18 Best Vegan Cookbooks for Every Type of Meal" in 2023, and VegNews named her 2018 cookbook, Hot for Food Vegan Comfort Classics: 101 Recipes to Feed Your Face, as one of the "Top 100 Vegan Cookbooks of All Time," in 2024.

Refinery29 included Toyota in their 2018 list of "Canadian Women Killing It". OptiMYz listed her in their list of "Top 100 Health and Fitness Influencers of 2019".

== Awards ==
- 2019: Gourmand Cookbook Award: Hot for Food Vegan Comfort Classics
- 2018: VegNews Veggie Award for Best Vegan Cookbook: Hot for Food Vegan Comfort Classics

== Books ==
- Hot for Food Vegan Comfort Classics: 101 Recipes to Feed Your Face. Ten Speed Press, 2018. ISBN 978-0399580147.
- Hot for Food All Day: Easy Recipes to Level Up Your Vegan Meals. Ten Speed Press, 2021. ISBN 978-1984857521.
