= Ray Cokes =

English television presenter

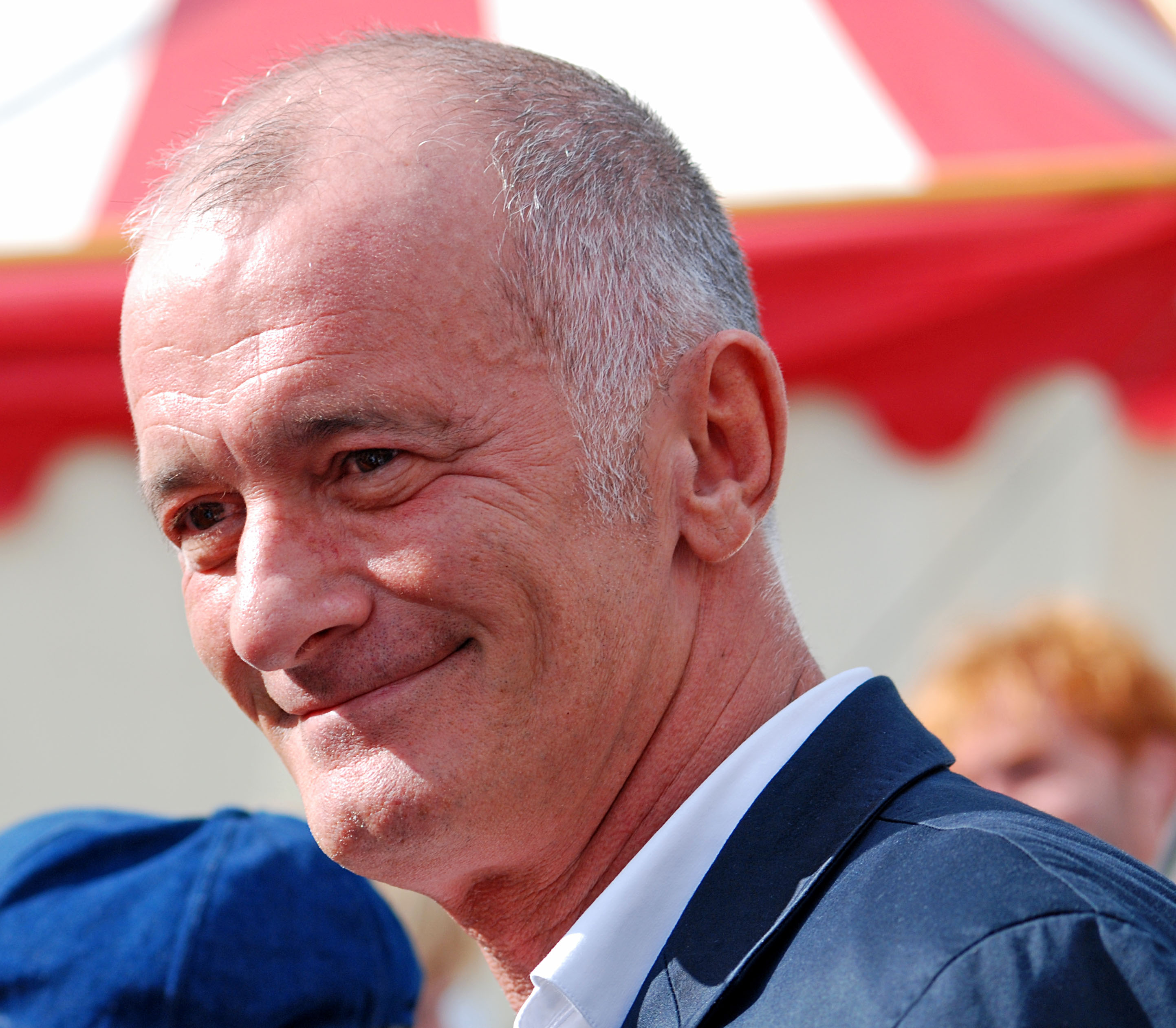
- Cokes in 2011
- Born: Raymond Christopher Cokes; 24 February 1958 (age 67); Isle of Wight, England
- Occupations: TV presenter; actor; musician
- Years active: 1978–present

Raymond Christopher Cokes (born 24 February 1958) is an English television presenter.

== Career ==
=== Early life ===
Cokes' father was an officer in the Royal Navy, and was stationed at various navy bases around the world. When Cokes was fifteen, the family permanently resettled back to Britain. At age 20, Cokes moved to Belgium, where he took on various jobs, including as a DJ on a local radio station. This led to a job as a music presenter on Belgian national TV channel RTBF, on which he presented the show Rox Box in 1982. With growing reputation, more music video shows followed, on Sky Channel and Music Box.

When MTV Europe launched in 1987, Cokes became a video jockey, regularly co-presenting alongside Marcel Vanthilt.

=== MTV's Most Wanted ===
Between 1992 and 1995, Cokes hosted MTV Europe's live television series MTV's Most Wanted, an award-winning daily show which soon became the most popular on channel with its zoo TV format. Each night (Tuesday to Friday), musical stars performed live as well as competitions and on-air phone calls to viewers. The team wanted to end the show at its peak, with the last six months with Will MacDonald as producer. MacDonald was associated with Chris Evans on many of his TV projects. The last musical act were The Cure, who let Cokes play guitar with them on their final song. Other guests that night included Björk and Bono from U2.

After a two-month sabbatical, MTV decided to spend money on a big once-a-week spectacular called X Ray Vision. Instead of coming from the studio, it used the first floor of the MTV building in Camden Lock.

After several weeks, the show went on location to Hamburg. It was billed to feature punk band Die Toten Hosen playing live on screen; however, a local journalist wrote that the band would be there in person. A large number of their fans turned up and were disappointed to discover the false advertising. They vented their anger by throwing glass bottles and beer at a confused Cokes and camera crew, who were unaware of what had been written in the press. For the safety of his crew, Cokes decided to end the show early. MTV used him as a scapegoat, and a week later the show went out for a final time, bringing Cokes' time at MTV to an end, after nine years.

Not long after, MTV Europe broke up into localised versions, and in 1994 Cokes released a single titled "Simply Sexy!", under the name Ray Cokes & the Sex Gods, featuring Al Agami, the song's title referring to one of the catchphrases frequently used in Most Wanted.

=== After MTV ===
While working with Will MacDonald on MTV's Most Wanted Cokes met Chris Evans, who brought him to the original Virgin 1215 in the UK. The show went out weekday evenings in a similar time slot to his old TV show.

Cokes also presented series 2 of Channel Four's hit 90s TV show Wanted.

His subsequent work includes presenting En Direct de from 2005 to 2009, broadcast on the French television station France 4.

Cokes also became the compère for the White Concert, a live concert recorded in Horsens, Denmark, in November 2008 in honour of the 40th anniversary of the Beatles' eponymous White Album.

In late 2008 he moved to Berlin and in 2009 to Antwerp, Belgium, declaring that he would like to permanently settle there.

During the summer of 2009, Cokes and Jean Blaute co-hosted Tournée Générale, a 10-part exploration of Belgian beer around the world from Sputnik Media, on Flemish channel Canvas. A second 10-part series was aired in 2011 and a third in 2013 on the Belgian channel Eén.

In September 2011, Cokes hosted the Sunday afternoon show Cokes calling on Classic 21, one of the radio stations of the Belgian RTBF.

From 2012 to 2014, he was one of the three judges in Belgium's Got Talent.

In February 2014, he hosted the Swedish music award ceremony the Grammis.

In October 2014, he released his autobiography, My Most Wanted Life - On-Screen, Off-Screen and In-Between, available in German and English editions.

During the COVID-19 pandemic, Cokes whilst living in Spain hosted an Instagram live show several nights a week.

In March 2024 Cokes started a weekly Saturday night live radio show in Germany on Radioeins.
