= MTV's Greatest Hits =

- MTV's Greatest Hits in 1990.
- Directed by: Neil Breakwell
- Presented by: Paul King
- Music by: Peter Good (programming)
- Country of origin: United Kingdom
- Original language: English

Production
- Executive producer: Sara Martin
- Running time: 60 minutes

Original release
- Network: MTV Europe
- Release: 19 March 1990 – 1996

MTV's Greatest Hits was a pop music program on the European television channel MTV. It started on 19 March 1990, and between 1991 and 1994 was presented by Paul King, with Pip Dann, Richie Rich and others substituting for King in his absence. King used a variety of catchphrases. MTV's Greatest Hits gained in popularity through the years. After Paul King's departure the show continued on MTV with different VJs, and ended in or about 1996.

== Content ==
The main concept was to show all the greatest hits from the 1960s, 1970s, 1980s and early 1990s. The program featured videos from Madonna, Prince, Duran Duran and others.

The show was broadcast at 4pm and then repeated at 10pm CET. In 1993, the program was aired at 1pm and then at 8pm

== Farewell to Paul King ==
The last edition with Paul King was aired on 29 July 1994. He said: "I am pulling out some of those videos that I really do think deserve to be called great and classic".

His choices were:

- Laid Back - Bakerman
- Talking Heads - Once In A Lifetime
- David Bowie - Ashes To Ashes
- The Cure - Close To Me
- Depeche Mode - Enjoy The Silence
- A House - Endless Art
- The The - Heartland
- Prince - I Wish U Heaven
- Michael Jackson - Thriller (uncut version)
