= The Lick with Trevor Nelson =

- Presented by: Trevor Nelson
- Country of origin: United Kingdom

Production
- Running time: 30 min per episode

Original release
- Network: MTV UK
- Release: 5 January 1998

The Lick, also known as The Lick with Trevor Nelson, is a music television show that features interviews and music videos from selected artists presented by Trevor Nelson on MTV Europe. The show focuses on rhythm and blues, hip-hop, soul, and urban music. The show aired on MTV Europe, MTV UK, MTV Nordic and MTV Germany. The show later ceased broadcasting on MTV Germany and was available only on MTV Europe and MTV UK. In 1999, MTV launched a 24-hour urban music channel MTV Base spin-off shows such as The Late Lick and Lick Shots also featured on the channel.

It is an informative music show designed to inform the general public about the world of hip-hop and R&B. It used to air every Wednesday at 20:00, and a repeat show with extra interviews and music videos would air under the title The Late Lick at 23:00 on MTV UK. The shows air-times varied on MTV Europe. The show would later start broadcasting only on MTV Base every Sunday at 19.30. The show also released two compilation albums to support the show.

The show ceased broadcasting on MTV Base in the late 2000s to be replaced by the MTV Base Chart.

== MTV Lick Parties ==
Events known as "Lick Parties" took place every year. The show would tour many parts of the UK (such as London, Manchester, Glasgow, and Edinburgh) before it set out to other European cities (such as Dublin, Cork, Stockholm, Amsterdam and Reykjavík). These Lick Parties would air on MTV channels across Europe. Many celebrity DJs and artists play around Europe. Trevor Nelson, Hanif & DJ Dodge being the resident DJs for tours.

== Notable guests ==
- Mariah Carey
- Aaliyah
- Beyoncé
- Usher
- The Game
- Diddy
- Method Man
- Redman
- Destiny's Child
- 50 Cent and G-Unit
- Nas
- Jay-Z
- R. Kelly
- Mel B
- Craig David
- Left Eye
- Lauryn Hill
