= Eden Harel =

Israeli actress

- עדן הראל
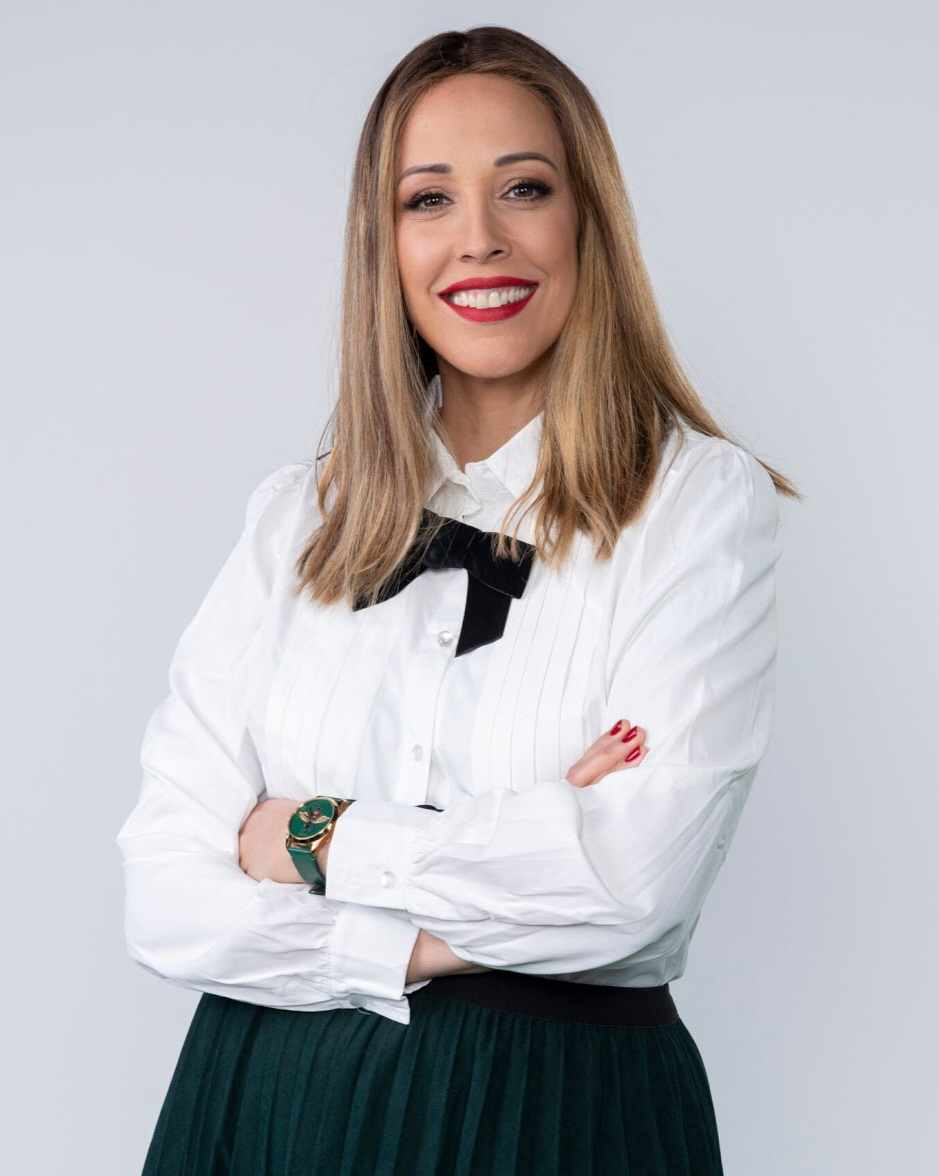
- Born: February 10, 1976 (age 50); Eilat, Israel
- Citizenship: Israel
- Occupation: Actor
- Partner: Oded Menashe

Eden Harel (Hebrew: עדן הראל; born Adva Harel, February 10, 1976) is an Israeli actress. She was an MTV Europe VJ during the 1990s. she hosts a TV show on Channel 14

== Biography ==
=== Early life ===
Harel was born in Eilat. Growing up, she went to the boarding school of WIZO Hadasim. After she finished high school, she moved to Tel Aviv.

=== MTV career ===
In 1994, at the age of eighteen, she became an MTV VJ on MTV Europe. Between 1994 and 2000, Harel was one of the best known VJs on MTV. She hosted several shows, including the phone-in show MTV Select, The Dance Chart and Euro Top 20. She also appeared on some special events such as the MTV Europe Music Awards and in 1998, she hosted the Miss World Pageant with singer Ronan Keating (in which the Israeli candidate won).

=== Post-MTV ===
After her contract with MTV Europe ended, she went to India for a year and lived in a Buddhist monastery. By 2001 she returned to Israel. With her return to Israel, she co-hosted a live children's television show. In 2002 she became the host of the Israeli reality show Project Y and was the host of a radio show. In 2003 she was the host of a children's talent contest and a consultation program. In 2005 she hosted a celebrity interview show and appeared in the series In the Sign Venus, hosted the live 8 show, and began to write a column for the Israeli magazine Go. She also hosted a Survivor-related talk show. Presently she appears in a fashion campaign for the Israeli "Aristo Shmat".

In 2024, Harel and her husband, Oded Menashe, co-hosted the International Bible Contest.

== Private life ==
Harel's spouse is the Israeli TV host Oded Menashe. The couple married on February 22, 2007, and have six children together. Their first son was born on January 29, 2008. (Harel also has a child from a previous marriage.) They live in Ra'anana. Harel is baalat teshuva (she became religious) and observes the Sabbath.
