= Steve Blame =

British journalist

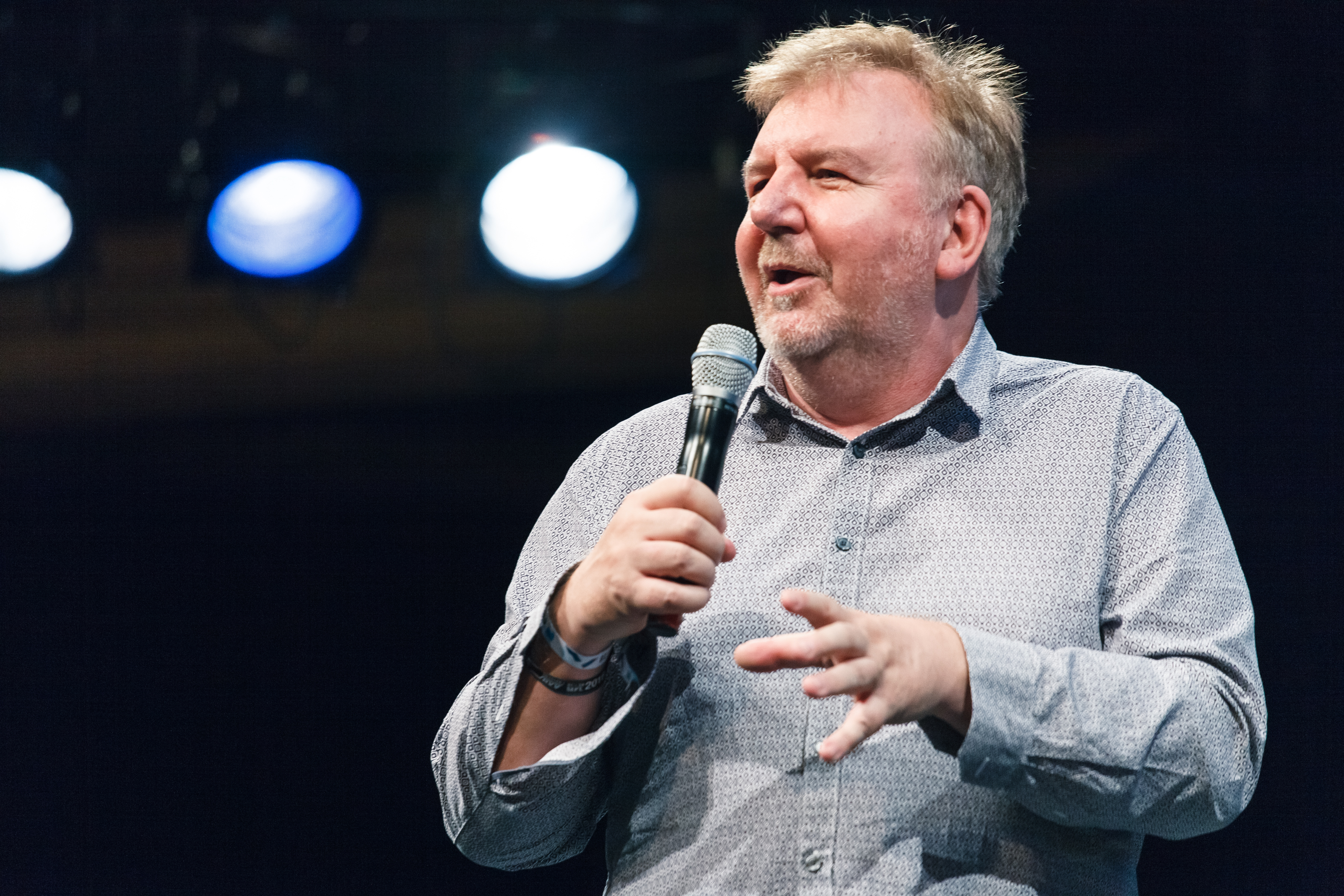
Steve Blame, 2016

Steve Blame (born Steve James) is a British television presenter and screenwriter. He was the news editor and presenter between 1987 and 1994 for the television channel MTV.

== Education ==
Blame received a Combined Honours Degree: Mathematics and Physics from Exeter University in 1980, and a master's degree in screen writing from the University of East Anglia in 2006.

== Career ==
=== MTV ===
Blame presented MTV news bulletins from the MTV studios in Camden, and also on location in several countries in Europe. He presented MTV News at Night from 1987 to 1994, and the daily news show.

During his time at MTV he interviewed many pop stars of that era. As the main on-air presenter he also interviewed Mikhail Gorbachev, Jacques Delors, Shimon Peres, the Dalai Lama and Gro Harlem Brundtland. In this function, he commented on an MTV campaign trying to get young people to vote.

Blame hosted MTV Free Your Mind in 1992, with live debate about racism in Europe with studio guests including Campino and Jean Paul Gaultier amongst others), and filmed interviews included Wolfgang Schäuble and Peter Hain MP.

He hosted MTV's HIV/AIDS awareness campaigns on World Aids Day.

Take the Blame in 1988 was a weekly six-part chat show hosted by Blame and Leigh Bowery. Guests included Jackie Collins, The Communards, Boy George, Adam West (Batman), Nina Hagen, Lenny Henry, Leo Sayer, Jean Michel Jarre and Dolph Lundgren amongst others. The show contained sketches remaking famous movie scenes including Casablanca, Superman and The Sound of Music.

He hosted MTV's U.S. Video Music Awards (European version), and was a backstage host from MTV's Video Music Awards from the U.S. Interviews included Nirvana, Aerosmith, Mick Jagger, Whitney Houston, Annie Lennox, and Lenny Kravitz.

Reverb in 1988 was a weekly review show, presented by Blame and Chris Salewicz. This six-part series was replaced by Take the Blame.

He also hosted interview specials with artists including Madonna in Milan, Boy George, Sinéad O'Connor, and Paul McCartney.

=== Viva 2 (1994-1996) ===
After leaving MTV in 1994, Blame moved to Germany where he set up VIVA Zwei. Under his direction the channel won the Gold Art Director's Award for its on-air design in 1996. Blame was the presenter of Geschmacksache – a weekly format on Viva Zwei where artists chose the videos which inspired them the most in their careers. From 1994 to 1996 he was the channel's program director.

=== Tango TV ===
In 2002 Blame became program director at Tango TV, and was responsible for the launch of the music channel in Luxembourg.

=== Other TV appearances ===
Blame made a guest appearance on TV total, a German late-night television comedy talk show that on ProSieben.

On RTL, he fronted alternative view features for RTL's Saturday evening show including The Royal Wedding, The German Test and the Cannes Film Festival. He also appeared as a guest on RTL II in the 1990s, on Pop Sünde (Pop Sins) and on The Pop Years.

He made a guest appearance on MTV Germany to celebrate its 23rd anniversary.

On ITV he was the presenter of Simply The Best, a music documentary about Tina Turner in 1992.

=== Acting ===
Blame played himself in 30:e november, a Swedish anti-racist movie directed by Daniel Fridell.

=== Discography ===
Blame performed on the single Give Me Your Love (Je T'aime) in 1993 with La Camilla of Army of Lovers.

=== Screenwriting ===
Blame is currently a screenwriter and TV format developer based in Cologne. His latest format Where is the Money, co-created with Eyeworks and 2STV, was nominated for the Rose d'Or award in 2005. It has run in the Netherlands and Spain.

His autobiography, Getting Lost is Part of the Journey: MTV, Deutschland und Ich (ISBN 978-3785760390), was published in 2010.
