= Kristiane Backer =

German art dealer

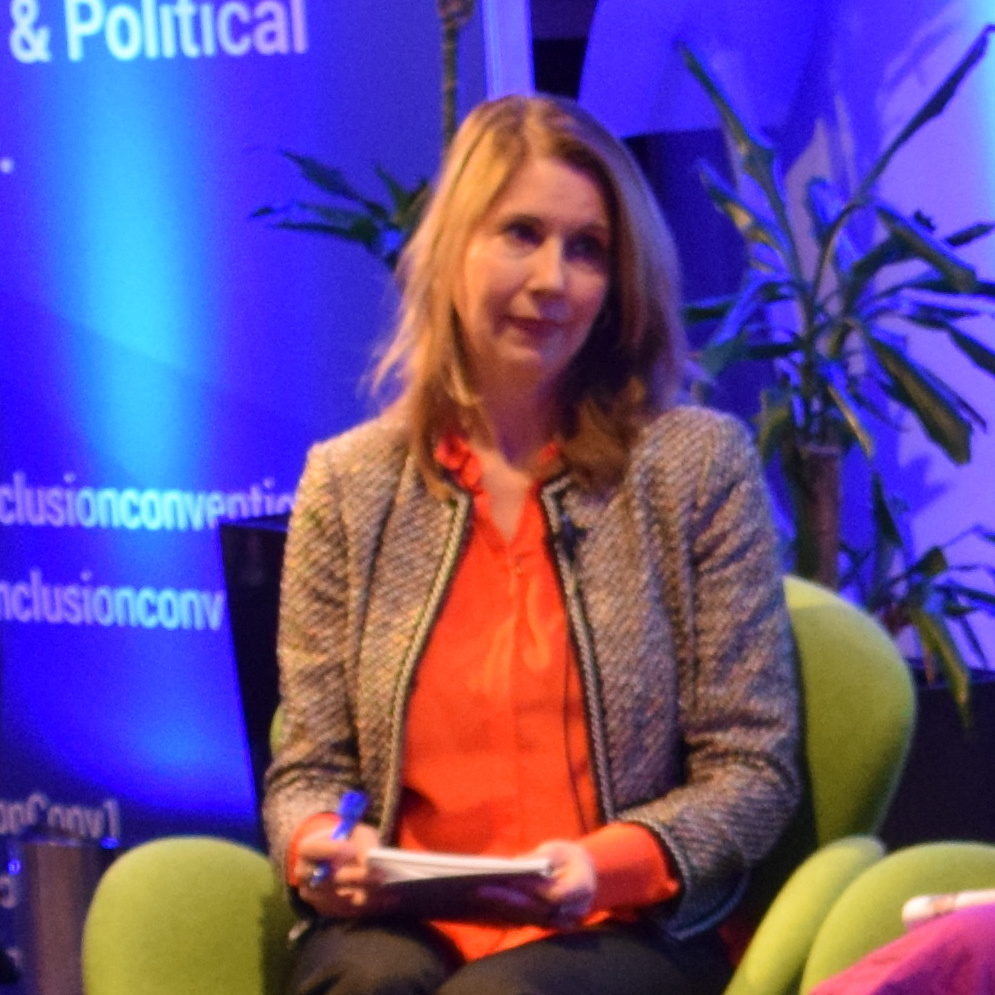
- Kristiane Backer in 2018
- Born: 13 December 1965 (age 60); Hamburg, West Germany
- Occupations: TV presenter, journalist, author
- Years active: 1987–present

Kristiane Verena Backer (born 13 December 1965) is a German art dealer with a previous career as a television presenter, journalist and author residing in London.

== Biography ==
At the age of 15, Backer went to the United States as an exchange student for a year.

From 1987 to 1989 Backer volunteered at the private radio station Radio Hamburg.

In 1989 she moved to London to work at the then Europe-wide, exclusively English-language TV channel, MTV Europe. Backer was the first German to present and VJ there and among the programmes she presented were The Coca-Cola Report, The European Top 20 and Awake on the Wild Side. She remained there until 1996. While still at MTV Europe, she created and moderated the youth program Bravo TV on the German TV channel RTL II from 1993 to 1995.

From 1996 to 1999 she presented the daily cultural programme The Ticket on NBC Europe.

From 2000 to 2009, Backer continued to do TV presenting as well as voiceover work. In 2005 she presented the in-flight music show for Emirate Airlines.

For her work as a television presenter, Backer was awarded a Goldene Kamera award in 1994 and in 1993 and 1994 two Bravo Otto awards.

Backer also hosts and presents conferences, business presentations, and galas throughout Europe.

== Personal life ==
In 1992, Backer began dating former Pakistani cricketer and now former prime minister Imran Khan. He gave her books on Islam and took her travelling with him through Pakistan. In 1995, she converted to Sunni Islam from Protestantism. The relationship ended after the three years. According to Backer, she and Khan were planning to get married and move to Skardu.

She does not wear a headscarf at all times but insists that "women who cover themselves are not discriminated against but respected." In May 2009 she published the book From MTV to Mecca – How Islam Changed My Life.

On 14 April 2006, she married the Moroccan television journalist Rachid Jaafar. She and Jaafar later divorced. Backer lives in London and works as a fine art consultant.

== Voice filmography ==
- 1994: Asterix Conquers America as Ha-Tschi (German Dub)

== Publications ==
- From MTV to Mecca: How Islam Inspired My Life, 2009; ISBN 978-1908129819
- Der Islam als Weg des Herzens: Warum ich Muslima bin, 2010; ISBN 978-3-548-74511-4
