= Dave Kendall =

British journalist, editor, producer and television host (c. 1963–2026)

- Born: c. 1963; Liverpool, England, United Kingdom
- Died: c. July 2026 (aged 63)
- Occupations: DJ, VJ
- Years active: 1986–2026

David Kendall (c. 1963 – c. July 2026) was a British-born journalist, editor, producer and VJ. He was best known as the creator and host of MTV's 120 Minutes, an alternative music program that played Sunday nights at midnight from 1986 to 2003.

== Life and career ==
Kendall was born in Liverpool, England. He initially started working in the music industry as a writer for such publications as Melody Maker and Spin. He relocated to New York City in 1984, originally on an exchange program through the London School of Economics from which he later quit. He created 120 Minutes in 1986, and became the host in 1988. In 1991, Kendall debuted Nirvana's "Smells Like Teen Spirit".

After the cancellation of 120 Minutes, he worked on the internet, creating programs such as The Daily Dish, while also working as a DJ in New York and London and producing content for TechTV/G4, Sky, Channel 4, Travel Channel and Animal Planet.

Kendall regularly played the Los Angeles club scene as a DJ during these decades. He also mixed the A Voyage into Trance Vol. 2 album released in 2001.

Kendall was a producer/reporter with the Bangkok Post from 2018 until 2025, and a host/producer on the travel show Destination Thailand. He also hosted Party 360 with Dave Kendall on the Sirius Satellite Radio 1st Wave channel.

At the time of his death, Kendall lived in Bali, Indonesia.

== Death ==
Kendall died in July 2026 at the age of 63, with his death announced by friend and former 120 colleague Matt Pinfield on 14 July 2026. In a statement, MTV remarked that Kendall's "passion for the genre, and his role as a tastemaker in discovering the artists who would shape popular culture, helped make MTV a destination for alternative music."
