= Dial MTV =

Original release
- Network: MTV
- Release: February 17, 1986 – June 1991

Dial MTV is a daily music video countdown program on MTV, with videos determined by viewers calling a 1-800 telephone number. It premiered on February 17, 1986, and ran until June 1991. Much like Total Request Live, Dial MTV played the most requested videos of the day, as requested by viewers who dialed in (hence, the name) to vote for their favorite video. The show generally aired Monday through Friday for 30 minutes to one hour. The scheduling and length fluctuated over the years. By 1989 the top twelve videos were shown daily.

The show had several different hosts, including Martha Quinn in 1986. The best known host in the US was Adam Curry. On MTV Europe, the show was hosted by Rebecca de Ruvo. Hard rock power ballads and even heavy metal songs often fared very well, even better than their concurrent performance on the Billboard Top 40 chart. "Home Sweet Home" by Mötley Crüe held the #1 position for over 90 days in 1986, causing MTV to invoke the "Crüe Rule", terminating a video's eligibility 30 days after its premiere. However, by 1988, the rules were loosened and Def Leppard's "Pour Some Sugar On Me" held the top spot for over 10 weeks that summer.

The program's request phone number, 1-800-DIAL-MTV (1-800-342-5688) remained in use for years after the program's cancellation as part of future live MTV programming, including MTV's Most Wanted, its direct replacement in June 1991, which ran until 1996, and Total Request Live.
