= Pocket Dwellers =

Canadian musical group

- Origin: Toronto, Ontario, Canada
- Genres: Hip hop
- Years active: 1996–present
- Labels: Blue Note
- Members: Dennis Passley Jr. Nigel Williams; John Griffith; Marco Raposo; Gord Shields; Christian McKibbin; Sheldon Moore; Dave Leitao

The Pocket Dwellers are a Canadian seven-member experimental hip-hop group from the Toronto area. The band's main genre is hip-hop, but their music is influenced by jazz, funk, soul, and breakbeat.

== History ==
The Pocket Dwellers began forming together in 1996. That year the band performed at EdgeFest in Toronto. In 1999, the band performed in Hamilton as part of Showcase '99.

The Pocket Dwellers released their first full-length record in 2000 after they signed a recording deal with Song Corp, and a second album, Digitally Organic, later that year. Song Corp went bankrupt in early 2001, leaving the second album with no promotion.

The next release was the album recorded live during sold-out performances at a club in Toronto called the Reverb. The recording was released under Urbnet records.

In 2005, they signed with Blue Note/EMI and released PD-Atrics. The recording was more hip hop based and involved less live instrumentation than had been employed in the past. In 2006, the band was nominated for a Juno award for best new group.

== Members ==
Member roster of The Pocket Dwellers.

- Dennis Passley "Deknow" – tenor saxophone
- Nigel Williams "N.I.Gel" – vocals
- John Griffith "Quest" – saxophone, flute
- Marco Raposo "Red" – drums
- Gord Shields "Jupiter" – bass guitar
- Christian McKibbin "Holy C" – guitar
- Sheldon Moore "S-luv" – turntables
- Dave Leitao "Epstein" - keyboard

guest musicians:

- Brownman Ali – trumpet

== Discography ==
=== Albums ===
1. Limited Edition - EP (1998)
2. Digitally Organic (August 29, 2002)
3. Lifecheck (August 19, 2003)
4. PD-Atrics (October 4, 2005)
5. Conception: The Mix Tape Volume 2 (2005)
