= Will Macdonald =

British TV producer, executive, writer

Will Macdonald (born 1966) is a British television producer, executive and writer who first became known for his association with Chris Evans with whom he devised and produced the Channel 4 programmes Don't Forget Your Toothbrush and TFI Friday.

On TFI Friday Macdonald also appeared on screen as Evans’ sidekick, a running gag being reference to him as “Wiiiiill” with audience members pointing their fingers at him as they chanted his name. He also produced MTV's Most Wanted and went on to be the creative director of Monkey Kingdom which produced Made in Chelsea and Made in Chelsea: NYC.

Whilst studying Zoology at Brasenose College, Oxford his thesis "Experimental manipulation of the dawn and dusk chorus in the Blackbird" was published in the scientific journal Behavioral Ecology and Sociobiology (Vol 26, No 3, Innes C Cuthill & William A Macdonald 1990)
