= Townline =

Canadian rock band

- Genres: Rock
- Years active: 2002–present
- Label: TVT Records
- Members: Serena Pruyn; Nick Lesyk; Greg Zack; Allan Colavecchia

Townline (formerly Oliver Black) is a Canadian rock group from Welland, Ontario. Members of the band include Serena Pryne (vocals), Nick Lesyk (guitar), Greg Zack (bass guitar), and Allan Colavecchia (drums). Musically, the band performs heavy rock and roll music, with music that appears to be influenced by older artists such as AC/DC, Led Zeppelin, Janis Joplin, and The Ramones, but performed in such a manner that allows their music to stay fresh and non-derivative. The band has been described as "If Tina Turner sang lead for The Cult."

== History ==
The band originally formed, under the name Lenz Riot, in March 2002, and played primarily cover songs at shows throughout the St. Catharines area. As the members of the band began to write songs together, they changed their name to Oliver Black (in 2004). Since then, Oliver Black has performed shows across Canada, opening for bands as diverse as Rush, Thornley, Default, Jeff Martin, and The Trews.

The band has gained a reputation as consistently providing high-quality live performances, including receiving a score of 93/100 from Chart Attack magazine for their 2004 performance at the North by Northeast music festival in Toronto, Ontario.

In January 2005, the band was signed to TVT Records, with Universal Music Canada being responsible for distribution in Canada. To date, this relationship has led to the release of one EP, Live in Texas, which was released on March 21, 2006. The follow-up to this, the full-length album 6th And Brazo's, was expected to be released in 2006; however, as of June 2007, the album has not yet received a commercial release.

As part of the recording process, Oliver Black temporarily relocated to Austin, Texas, where they wrote and recorded parts of the album. The album name, 6th And Brazo's, is in fact a reference to an intersection in that town. While in Texas, Oliver Black also continued to build on their reputation as live performers, opening for bands such as Grady, Silvertide, and Ted Nugent.

In September 2008, Oliver Black officially changed their name to suit their new musical pursuits and sound to Townline.

== Discography ==
=== Albums ===
Title	Release date	Label	Track Listing
Live in Texas	March 21, 2006	TVT Records	Vices; Johnny; Last Call Jesus; Turn You On; One Way Ticket (unlisted track)
