= MTV's Most Wanted =

- Ray Cokes presenting MTV’s Most Wanted
- Presented by: Ray Cokes
- Country of origin: United Kingdom
- Original language: English

Production
- Producer: Will Macdonald
- Camera setup: Andy Cam; Rob Mansfield; Greg O’Callaghan

Original release
- Network: MTV Europe
- Release: 14 April 1992 – 15 December 1995

MTV's Most Wanted is a television series on MTV Europe which was broadcast from 1992 to 1995, based in London, England. It was presented by Ray Cokes. The series was broadcast live from MTV Studios in Camden and featured blends of viewer interaction, competitions, live music performances, and music videos.

Perhaps unusually the crew, including floor managers and camera operators featured heavily in this series, which had one certain ad lib style. Show regulars included “Pathetic Pat” and “Rob the Cameraman” who filmed in typical freehand style by MTV and to whom Cokes talked without his being seen on screen.

== Cast ==
- Ray Cokes, host
- Will MacDonald, producer
