= MTV's Busted =

MTV's Busted is a reality television series that depicts young adults (mostly students in college) getting arrested and penalized by police. Most arrests are for alcohol-related crimes, such as drunk driving and underage drinking. Arrests for possession of marijuana are also common. Busted began airing in summer 2008. The stories are shown from the officers' point of view with the arrestee's video commentary added in.

In September 2008, the show's film crews were present during a tasering incident, which resulted in a 19-year-old young man dying at the hands of police in Lincoln, Nebraska.
