= 120 Minutes =

American music-oriented television show

- Created by: Dave Kendall
- Presented by: Kevin Seal (1986-1987); Dave Kendall (1988–1992); Lewis Largent (1992–1995); Matt Pinfield (1995–1999, 2011–2013); Jim Shearer (2002–2003)
- Country of origin: United States
- No. of seasons: Original: 17; Revival: 1
- No. of episodes: Original: approx. 839; Revival: 15 (aired)

Production
- Running time: 120 minutes (80–90 without commercials)

Original release
- Network: MTV
- Release: March 10, 1986 – May 4, 2003
- Network: MTV2
- Release: July 30, 2011 – February 1, 2013

120 Minutes is a television program in the United States dedicated to the alternative music genre, that originally aired on MTV from 1986 to 2000, and then aired on MTV's associate channel MTV2 from 2001 to 2003.

After its cancellation, MTV2 premiered a replacement program called Subterranean. A similar but separate MTV Classic program, also titled 120 Minutes, plays many classic alternative videos that were regularly seen on 120 Minutes in its heyday.

120 Minutes returned as a monthly program on MTV2 on July 30, 2011, with Matt Pinfield as host.

In March 2023, former 120 Minutes host Lewis Largent died at the age of 58.

== History ==
=== The early years ===
120 Minutes' most recognisable logo used during Matt Pinfield's tenure from 1995 to 1998

120 Minutes was conceived of in 1986 by newly hired MTV producer Dave Kendall, who hosted the program from 1988 until 1992. The program first aired on March 10, 1986, at 1:00 a.m. Eastern Time, with various video jockeys as hosts until Kevin Seal became the first permanent host in 1987.

For the first ten years of 120 Minutes, viewers could see artists as varied as Kate Bush, The Ramones, Morrissey, Kitchens of Distinction and Hüsker Dü. Nirvana's music video for "Smells Like Teen Spirit" received a world premiere on 120 Minutes. From mid-1988 to 1990, a weeknight companion titled PostModern MTV aired Mondays through Thursdays from 11:30 pm to midnight. This was followed in the mid-1990s by its better known spiritual successor, Alternative Nation, which had a similar emphasis on more mainstream-leaning alternative acts such as INXS and U2.

=== From MTV to MTV2 ===
The show began featuring more mainstream artists in the late 1990s, playing the likes of Staind and later Sum 41. In 2000, the show was sometimes preempted for reruns of The Real World, Loveline, and Undressed, before being taken off the airwaves altogether in the summer of 2000. In 2001, it returned on MTV2, where it returned to the style of music it was known for.

==== Cancellation ====
Having been gradually relegated to a late night time slot since 2002, the show was canceled with no formal announcement from MTV2 on May 4, 2003. In the final episode, the then host Jim Shearer shared the screen with the show's creator Dave Kendall, as well as Matt Pinfield. The two "classic era" hosts shared their favorite videos from over the years, finally ending with the selection of Siouxsie and the Banshees's "Kiss Them for Me" as the final video aired.

=== 120 Minutes with Matt Pinfield ===
120 Minutes made its return to MTV2 on July 31, 2011, at 1 a.m. ET. Matt Pinfield reprised his role as the host and the program was formally called 120 Minutes with Matt Pinfield. The revived program initially aired on a monthly basis, but returned to a weekly format in late November 2011. It aired Fridays 6 a.m.–8 a.m. on MTV2. In addition to videos and interviews from alternative rock and indie rock artists, the program also featured music from underground hip hop, alternative hip hop, electronica, turntablism, and dubstep artists. In the revival, viewers could see artists as varied as Beady Eye, The Kills, Mumford & Sons, Alabama Shakes, Death Cab for Cutie, Lupe Fiasco and Grouplove.120 Minutes also aired as a two-minute clip in a series called 120 Seconds which can be seen on MTVhive.com.

120 Minutes was removed from the MTV2 schedule without announcement. The last airing was February 1, 2013. A two-hour indie block called Artists to Watch took its slot during the same Friday 7 a.m.–9 a.m. ET block. However, that program stopped airing since May 2013.

MTV's sister channel MTV Classic (formerly called VH1 Classic) airs a similar program with the name 120 Minutes (formerly called "The Alternative") on its Saturday/Sunday and Sunday/Monday midnight time slot (on which the original show aired). This version of the show, however, has no host and highlights more well established alternative artists of the 1980s and 1990s; mostly replaying videos that originally aired on MTV.

== List of 120 Minutes hosts ==
The following MTV VJs hosted 120 Minutes on a regular basis.

- J. J. Jackson (1986)
- Martha Quinn (1986)
- Alan Hunter (1986)
- Downtown Julie Brown (1980s)
- Adam Curry (1987)
- Carolyne Heldman (1980s)
- Kevin Seal (1987-1989)
- Dave Kendall (1988-1992)
- Lewis Largent (1992–1995)
- Matt Pinfield (1995–1999; 2011–2012)
- Dave Holmes (1999–2000)
- Jancee Dunn (2001)
- Chris Booker (2001–2002)
- Jim Shearer (2002–2003)

== 120 Minutes albums ==
=== Never Mind the Mainstream ===
In 1991, two CDs were released entitled "Never Mind the Mainstream: The Best of MTV's 120 Minutes" volumes 1 and 2 and featured many songs featured on the program. Artists included Red Hot Chili Peppers, Echo & the Bunnymen, Julian Cope, R.E.M., Sinéad O'Connor, Ministry, Depeche Mode, Sonic Youth, and Violent Femmes. The title referenced the Sex Pistols' landmark album Never Mind the Bollocks, but fortuitously also recalled the title of Nirvana's Nevermind album which was released near-simultaneously.

Volume One:

1. Red Hot Chili Peppers – "Higher Ground"
2. Soul Asylum – "Sometime to Return"
3. The Stone Roses – "Fools Gold" (Single Edit)
4. The Mission UK – "Wasteland"
5. Bob Mould – "See a Little Light" (CD Bonus Track)
6. The Church – "Under the Milky Way"
7. Cocteau Twins – "Carolyn's Fingers" (CD Bonus Track)
8. Julian Cope – "World Shut Your Mouth"
9. Sinéad O'Connor – "Mandinka"
10. Sonic Youth – "Kool Thing"
11. Robyn Hitchcock & The Egyptians – "Balloon Man"
12. World Party – "Put the Message in the Box" (CD Bonus Track)
13. XTC – "Dear God"
14. They Might Be Giants – "Ana Ng"
15. Camper Van Beethoven – "Eye of Fatima (Pt. 1)"
16. Modern English – "I Melt with You" (CD Bonus Track)

Volume Two:

1. R.E.M. – "Orange Crush"
2. Public Image Ltd. – "This Is Not a Love Song"
3. Ramones – "Do You Remember Rock 'N' Roll Radio?"
4. X – "Burning House of Love" (CD Bonus Track)
5. Ministry – "Stigmata"
6. Morrissey – "Everyday Is Like Sunday"
7. The Jesus and Mary Chain – "Head On" (CD Bonus Track)
8. Echo and the Bunnymen – "The Killing Moon"
9. Joy Division – "Love Will Tear Us Apart"
10. New Order – "The Perfect Kiss"
11. Depeche Mode – "Personal Jesus"
12. The Sugarcubes – "Birthday" (CD Bonus Track)
13. Hüsker Dü – "Could You Be the One?"
14. Faith No More – "We Care a Lot"
15. Violent Femmes – "Gone Daddy Gone"
16. Wire – "Eardrum Buzz" (CD Bonus Track)

=== 120 Minutes Live ===
In 1998, an album was released by Atlantic Records featuring 14 of the best and most memorable live performances on 120 Minutes from the 1990s.

1. Oasis – "Supersonic"
2. Morphine – "Honey White"
3. Porno for Pyros – "Kimberly Austin"
4. Evan Dando – "It's About Time"
5. P.J. Harvey – "C'mon Billy"
6. Weezer – "Undone – The Sweater Song"
7. Violent Femmes – "Kiss Off"
8. They Might Be Giants – "Particle Man"
9. Sex Pistols – "Pretty Vacant"
10. Bad Religion – "American Jesus"
11. Victoria Williams with Lou Reed – "Crazy Mary"
12. Björk – "Aeroplane"
13. The Verve Pipe – "Villains"
14. Radiohead – "Fake Plastic Trees"
