= MTV Global =

International pay TV network

- Logo used since 2021
- Country: United Kingdom
- Broadcast area: Europe (except Belarus, Cyprus, Estonia, Greece, Latvia and Ukraine); Middle East; Asia (except the Indian subcontinent); Oceania (except Australasia)
- Headquarters: 40 Conduit St, London, England (1987–1988); 20–23 Mandela St, London, England (1988–1993); 17–29 Hawley Crescent, London, England (since 1993)

Programming
- Language: English
- Picture format: 1080i (HDTV 16:9); 576i (SDTV 16:9)

Ownership
- Owner: Skydance Europe
- Sister channels: Nickelodeon Global Unlimited; Nick Jr. Channel; Nicktoons (Global)

History
- Launched: List: 1 August 1987; 39 years ago (United Kingdom, Republic of Ireland, Denmark, Finland, Hungarian People's Republic, Italy, Netherlands, Portugal, Socialist Republic of Romania, Spain and Sweden); 1988; 38 years ago (People's Socialist Republic of Albania, Andorra, West Germany, Austria, Belgium, Socialist Republic of Bosnia and Herzegovina, People's Republic of Bulgaria, Socialist Republic of Croatia, France, Switzerland, Greece, Cyprus, Iceland, Republic of Kosova, Liechtenstein, Luxembourg, Malta, Monaco, Socialist Republic of Montenegro, Socialist Republic of Macedonia, Norway, San Marino, Socialist Republic of Serbia, Socialist Republic of Slovenia and Vatican City); February 1990; 36 years ago (Poland and Czechoslovakia); March 1990; 36 years ago (MENA, Sub-Saharan Africa, Israel and Turkey); 8 March 1991; 35 years ago (Soviet Union)
- Founder: Viacom; Robert Maxwell Group; British Telecom
- Closed: List: 14 December 2022; 3 years ago (Belarus); 1 November 2025; 12 months ago (Australia); 1 December 2025; 11 months ago (New Zealand); 1 January 2026; 10 months ago (Cyprus, Estonia, Greece, Latvia and Ukraine)
- Former names: MTV Europe (1987–2002, 2011–2021); MTV European (2002–2011)

Links
- Website: mtv.com/global

MTV Global (formerly MTV Europe) is the international version of the American TV channel MTV as 24-hour music video and entertainment pay television network officially launched on 1 August 1987 as part of the worldwide MTV network.

Over the years, MTV Global has been divided into several different channels for certain countries. Most countries in Europe, Asia, Oceania, Latin America and the Caribbean got their own versions of the channel, and therefore MTV Global would then mostly available in those countries where there is no localised version of MTV.

Formerly, the channel had sister music channels (MTV 80s, MTV 90s, MTV 00s, MTV Live, Club MTV and MTV Hits), until 31 December 2025 when those channels ceased broadcasting, along with the merger of most international versions to the global schedule. In 2026, MTV Global began directing content focused exclusively on entertainment and reality shows.

Initially, MTV served all regions of Europe, being one of the few TV channels focused on the entire European market. At the moment, MTV serves most of European countries along Asian, Oceanian, Middle Eastern, and Caribbean territories.

== History ==
=== 1986–1987: Preparation for the launch ===
In January 1986, MTV Networks Europe was established. The company included: owner of the MTV brand - Viacom (now Paramount Skydance), Mirror Group Newspapers (Maxwell), and British Telecom. The same three companies had already been part of another joint venture — Premiere Partnership — from 1984 to 1989, and operated the television channels Premiere and Home Video Channel in the United Kingdom. Paramount acquired the remaining stakes from Maxwell and BT in 1990–1991, thereby becoming the sole owner of MTV Networks Europe.

In December 1986, the launch of the MTV Europe was announced. Initially, the launch of the television channel was planned for April 1987. Later, the date was postponed to 15 August; however, the launch was then moved forward to 1 August.

In January 1987, MTV Networks Europe began recruiting VJs The first auditions and filming took place in May.

In June 1987, AIR TV, a company within the Chrysalis Group, provided the channel with technical broadcasting equipment (control room).

=== 1987–1996: Launch of the channel and expansion across countries ===
On 1 August 1987 at 00:01 BST, MTV Europe started broadcasting, with British musician Elton John turning on the signal from Amsterdam, NL. The first music video shown was Money for Nothing by Dire Straits. The beginning and end of the video were supplemented with the slogan "I want my MTV", voiced by Sting. For the launch, the channel organized a party at the Roxy club in Amsterdam; many stars were invited, such as Bruce Dickinson from Iron Maiden, Fish from Marillion, Terence Trent D'Arby, etc., the main guest and presenter was Elton John. The TV channel's office is still located in London.

The channel was launched in the United Kingdom, Republic of Ireland, Denmark, Finland, Hungarian People's Republic, Italy, the Netherlands, Portugal, Socialist Republic of Romania, Spain and Sweden; a year later MTV Europe expanded to People's Socialist Republic of Albania, Andorra, West Germany, Austria, Belgium, Socialist Republic of Bosnia and Herzegovina, People's Republic of Bulgaria, Socialist Republic of Croatia, France, Switzerland, Greece, Cyprus, Iceland, Republic of Kosova, Liechtenstein, Luxembourg, Malta, Monaco, Socialist Republic of Montenegro, Socialist Republic of Macedonia, Norway, San Marino, Socialist Republic of Serbia, Socialist Republic of Slovenia and the Vatican City. At launch, the channel was available in 1.6 million households, increasing to 3.6 million subscribers by August 1988; by year's end, it had reached 6.7 million households.

The original line-up of VJs included presenters from Belgium, Denmark and France, as well as Ray Cokes and Steve Blame from the UK. MTV popularized the use of the term VJ to describe music TV presenters.

Programs as MTV's Greatest Hits, Headbanger's Ball, MTV's Most Wanted, The Big Picture (a programme about cinema), The Pulse (about fashion and style), 120 Minutes and MTV Coca-Cola Report (music news, interviews and toured dates of musicians) were produced.

In February 1988, MTV Europe moved to the Camden Town area at 20-23 Mandela St.

In October of the same year, MTV Europe management visited the Soviet Union for preliminary negotiations on bringing the channel there. At the same time, an application for registration of the TV channel was submitted.

In 1989, MTV Europe covered the Moscow Music Festival live from the Lenin Stadium. At the same time, the TV channel started in East Berlin, East Germany, the same day as the dissolution of the East German cabinet. 10 million subscribers across Europe were now picking the channel. Soviet artists officially debuted on MTV in the summer of 1989. The Moscow group "Kruiz" released the Hit for MTV manifesto song at the same time.

In February 1990, MTV Europe was launched in Poland and Czechoslovakia. In the same year, the channel expanded beyond Europe, launching in the MENA, Sub-Saharan Africa, Israel and Turkey. A British winner got Madonna's gold stage costume designer for her Blonde Ambition tour in a competition held by the channel; other such cases included a 50-year old Yugoslavian winning a Harley-Davidson that was owned by Billy Idol and a winner receiving radio station.

In early 1991, Metromedia International Group together with Lencentel signed a contract with MTV Europe for five years, the first contract for broadcasting a foreign channel signed in the USSR. On 8 March 1991, the channel began broadcasting in Leningrad, and later in other major cities, which made it possible to become the first Western 24-hour channel broadcast in the USSR.

American rock band Nirvana led the rapid transition to the rise of alternative rock and grunge on MTV in 1991, releasing a music video for the song "Smells Like Teen Spirit" by Nirvana. In the early-mid-1990s, MTV added hip-hop rappers with a less pop sound to its rotation, such as Tupac Shakur, The Notorious B.I.G., Wu-Tang Clan, Ice Cube, Warren G, Ice-T, Dr. Dre, and Snoop Dogg.

In August 1991, MTV Europe broadcast the MTV 10 special, for the tenth anniversary of its US parent.

By 1992, MTV Networks Europe had become the largest pan-European broadcasting company. MTV Europe was hosted by 38 million households in 28 countries. In the same year, a teletext called MTV Text appeared on the TV channel, through which you can watch a TV programme, news, charts, participate in contests and communicate with the audience.

From 1989 to 1997, MTV programmes were rebroadcast on Russia's main TV channels – ORT and its predecessors, 2x2, TV-6, Muz-TV and others; also from 1991 to 1996 on the Polish TV channel TVP1.

The channel premiered the following animated programmes: Beavis and Butt-Head, Æon Flux, The Brothers Grunt, etc.

In 1994, the channel started holding the MTV Europe Music Awards (answer to VMAs) ceremony. Every year the ceremony takes place in a major European city. On 1 July 1995, MTV Europe switched to pay TV broadcasting, and was also one of the first channels in Europe to start digital broadcasting.

In September, the channel was fined a total of £60,000 by the UK's Independent Television Commission for showing obscenities, scenes of sadomasochism and similar things at a time of day when youths could be watching. In November of the same year, MTV Europe was hosted by 51.3 million households in 36 countries. At the end of 1995, Chello Zone became the distributor of the channel in Russia

In 1996–1997, two websites were registered – mtve.com and mtveurope.com.

=== 1996–2025: Regionalization and a gradual shift away from music ===
In September 1996, MTV Europe was split into three broadcast zones:

- MTV Northern (UK, France, Scandinavia, etc.)
- MTV Southern (Italy)
- MTV Central (Germany, Eastern Europe, the post-Soviet region, Greece, etc.)

All three channels followed the same broadcast schedule with minimal differences. Despite the changes, it was still MTV Europe.

MTV Networks Europe rapidly begun to open local divisions of the MTV channel. In March 1997, MTV Germany was launched: the German channel inherited the name MTV Central and kept it for several years. MTV UK & Ireland launched on 1 July, followed by MTV Italy in September.

All three MTV Europe zones were closed, and broadcasting once again became unified

From the end of 1997, MTV gradually reduced the number of rock music videos all broadcast, which skeptics labelled: "Rock is dead." Among the reasons cited for the change are that rock music fans bought less of what they saw advertised on TV. Instead, MTV began to devote its musical airtime mainly to pop and urban music. All rock shows were eliminated, and the rock-related categories at the Video Music Awards were reduced to one.

At the rise of the new millennium, in the period from 1997 to 2001, MTV broadcast animated comedy drama Daria.

MTV Nordic for Scandinavia launched in June 1998, MTV Russia appeared on 25 September. In 2000, other regional channels were launched – MTV France in June, followed by MTV Poland in July and MTV Spain and MTV Nederland in September. MTV Networks Europe continued to launch local channels in other European countries. In the same year, another website appeared – mtv.tv

On 15 April 1999, a fire broke out at the Breakfast complex. Engineers and studio staff aired emergency recordings, after which broadcasting was suspended for several hours. At that time, the complex housed the British and European operations of MTV and VH1.

On 1 April 2002, MTV Europe became MTV European. At the same time, the channel began to abandon some of its programs in favour of American MTV shows. The channel significantly reduced the overall rotation of music videos during the 2000s. Similar trends were observed on other European MTV channels.

In 2004 and 2008, MTV continued to focus on reality shows, releasing projects 8th & Ocean, Laguna Beach, Next, The Hills, Two-A-Days, My Super Sweet 16, Parental Control and Viva la Bam featuring Bam Margera.

In 2007, MTV broadcast the reality show A Shot at Love with Tila Tequila, which told about the sensational journey of Tila Tequila in search of her sex partner. Her bisexuality played a role in the concept of the show: both men and women competed for love.

In 2006–07, MTV Turkey and MTV Ukraine were launched. In August 2007, a second office opened in Warsaw, responsible for online operations (the website, social media, support, etc.). The main office remained in London.

On 1 July 2009, during the unified standardization of the design of the global MTV network, a new corporate identity was introduced, as well as a new design.

Since January 2010, MTV Networks Europe has started rebranding localized websites, creating standards for each country. In August, music programmes disappeared from the air, and reality shows from the American branch of MTV began to be shown instead.. Throughout the 2010s, the channel completely phased out advertising.

In 2010, the channel began broadcasting under a Czech license, since the Czech Republic has minimum broadcasting rules, it was chosen for licensing purposes in the EU. The broadcasting centre is still located in London MTV European began to focus on viewers from 16 to 35 years old, the audience was more than 100 million people in 43 countries.

On 1 July 2011, the logo and design of the channel changed, the inscription "Music Television" disappeared from the logo. The former name MTV Europe has also returned.

In 2012, all music charts discontinued from the channel. At the beginning of 2013, three charts returned to the air of MTV Europe — Hitlist UK, Base Chart and Dance Floor Chart.

In the autumn of 2014, the channel's website was transferred to the organisers of the MTV Europe Music Awards, now when switching to the website mtv.tv, redirects to the site tv.mtvema.com.

In the summer of 2015, MTV Europe reissued the inter-programme screensavers of TV channels, focusing on the initiative MTVBump.com, and provided more social screensavers created by MTV viewers.

On 1 March 2016, MTV Europe switched to widescreen broadcasting (16:9).

In December 2017, MTV received a new design, similar to Latin American and Brazilian MTV. Other local MTV channels across Europe have also started using similar on-air branding.

Since June 2019, all music videos are broadcast only until 8:00 Central European time, with the exception of the Euro Top Chart on Friday from 9 to 11:00.

On 26 January 2021, MTV Europe has been renamed MTV Global The channel retains its Czech license (RRTV) in order to ensure the continuation of legal broadcasting in the European Union in accordance with the EU Audiovisual Media Services Directive (AVMSD) and the Single Market Law after the UK leaves the European Union. On 14 September of the same year, a rebranding was carried out, which included an updated version of the logo and a new design.

On 8 and 19 September 2022, due to the death and funeral of Queen Elizabeth II, the TV channel removed all entertainment programmes from the air. Two music blocks were introduced: "Programming Pause" and "Nothing but Music", which broadcast relaxed and dim music videos.

At the beginning of 2023, a new programme "MTV Movies" was presented, it tells about the novelties of cinema.

In 2024; all international MTV websites were merged into a global website, and later into a local MTV social media redirection.

=== 2025–present: MTV without music progamming ===
The channel closed in Australia on 1 November 2025.

The channel closed in New Zealand on 1 December 2025.

On 31 December 2025, MTV Global completely abandoned music. The schedule now consists only of reality shows and other entertainment programs. All thematic sister channels were also shut down — MTV 80s, MTV 90s, MTV 00s, MTV Live, MTV Hits, and Club MTV. These channels aired music without commercial breaks. At the same time, most of the international MTV channels (French, Dutch, Spanish/Portuguese, Italian and African) were merged into MTV Global schedule, except the German, British and Latin American versions remaining a bit or less independent.

The channel closed in Cyprus, Estonia, Greece, Latvia and Ukraine on 1 January 2026.

At the beginning of 2026, Paramount Skydance announced plans to "relaunch" MTV and restore the brand’s musical focus. The company is already in talks with major players in the music industry about selling a certain stake in MTV, in return expecting the partner to provide not only funding but also music assets. If everything goes according to plan, the transition period will begin before the next round of negotiations with major TV operators in 2027.

== Logo ==
From 1 August 1987 to 31 August 1994

From 1 September 1994 to 30 June 2011

From 1 July 2011 to 13 September 2021

From 14 September 2021 onwards

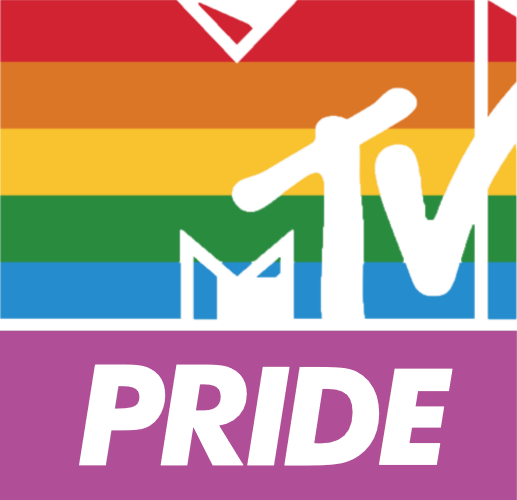
MTV Pride (Pop-up channel circa 2021)

== Distribution ==
As of 2026, MTV Global broadcasts in the following countries/territories:

Europe:

- Albania
- Bosnia and Herzegovina
- Bulgaria
- Croatia
- Czech Republic
- Denmark (with some localised content, advertising and subtitles)
- Finland (with some localised content, advertising and subtitles)
- Hungary
- Iceland
- Kosovo
- Lithuania
- Malta
- Moldova (with some localised content and advertising)
- Montenegro
- North Macedonia
- Norway (with some localised content, advertising and subtitles)
- Portugal
- Romania
- Serbia
- Slovakia
- Slovenia
- Sweden (with some localised content, advertising and subtitles)

Middle East & North Africa:

- Algeria
- Bahrain
- Chad
- Comoros
- Djibouti
- Egypt
- Iran
- Iraq
- Jordan
- Kuwait
- Lebanon
- Libya
- Mali
- Mauritania
- Morocco
- Oman
- Palestine
- Qatar
- Saudi Arabia
- Somalia
- Somaliland
- Sudan
- Syria
- Tunisia
- Turkey
- United Arab Emirates
- Western Sahara
- Yemen
- Zanzibar

Asia:

- Armenia (with some localised content and advertising)
- Azerbaijan (with some localised content and advertising)
- Brunei
- Cambodia
- Georgia (with some localised content and advertising)
- Indonesia
- Kazakhstan (with some localised content and advertising)
- Kyrgyzstan (with some localised content and advertising)
- Laos
- Malaysia
- Mongolia
- Myanmar
- Philippines
- Singapore
- Tajikistan (with some localised content and advertising)
- Thailand
- Timor-Leste
- Turkmenistan (with some localised content and advertising)
- Uzbekistan (with some localised content and advertising)
- Vietnam

Oceania:

- Fiji
- Kiribati
- Marshall Islands
- Micronesia
- Nauru
- Palau
- Samoa
- Solomon Islands
- Tonga
- Tuvalu
- Vanuatu

== Free-to-air satellite transmissions ==
MTV Germany was available FTA on Astra 19,2E, but it became encrypted on 1 January 2011. Until August 2015 the Italian MTV-station was free to air available on Eutelsat 12 West A. However, with the take-over of Sky Italia of this channel, it has been rebranded TV8. MTV Italia has become an exclusive Sky-channel only for subscribers. On 23 December 2017, MTV Germany turned itself into a free-to-air channel.

Award shows and live music specials

- Isle of MTV
- MTV Video Music Awards

Pan-international

- 16 and Pregnant
- Are You the One?
- Catfish: The TV Show
- Ex on the Beach
- Geordie Shore
- The Hills
- Jersey Shore
- Ridiculousness
- Siesta Key
- Teen Mom

== Former shows ==
- 3 from 1
- Alternative Nation
- Beavis and Butt-Head
- Behind the Music
- ByteSize
- Chill Out Zone
- Clone High
- Dancefloor Chart
- Data Videos
- Deliciousness
- European Top 20
- The Fridge
- Global Groove
- Hanging Out
- The Head
- Headbangers Ball
- HitList UK
- KickStart
- The L.A. Complex
- The Late Lick
- Lick Shots
- The Lick with Trevor Nelson
- M Is for Music
- Morning Mix
- Most Wanted
- MTV Alarm
- MTV Amour
- MTV Asks
- MTV Base Chart
- MTV Cribs
- MTV Dance Floor Chart
- MTV's Greatest Hits
- MTV Hitlist
- MTV Hot
- MTV Live
- MTV Mono
- MTV Movies
- MTV:New
- MTV News Daily Update
- MTV Only Hits
- MTV Post Modern
- MTV Push
- MTV Startrax
- MTV Unplugged
- MTV Video Clash
- MTV World Stage
- Music Mix
- Music Non Stop
- My Life on MTV
- Night Videos
- Non Stop Hits
- Nordic Top 5
- Number One Hits
- Party Zone
- RockBlock
- Roulette MTV
- Saturday Night Music Mix
- Select MTV
- Shakedown
- So '90's
- The Soul of MTV
- Summer of MTV
- Sunday Night Music Mix
- Superock
- Teen Mom OG
- Teen Wolf
- Top 10 at 10
- Top Selection
- Total Request
- Total Request Live
- True Life Crime
- True Life Crime UK
- The Valleys
- Videoclash
- World Chart Express
- X-elerator
- XPO
- Yo! MTV Raps
- Young and Married

=== Past VJs ===
- Ray Cokes (1987–1996) Cokes & Vanthilt, Ray's Requests, Most Wanted, X-Ray Vision, MTV at the Movies, The Big Picture, European Top 20, MTV's Greatest Hits
- Simone Angel (1990–1998) Party Zone, MTV Dance, Dance Floor, Club MTV, Dance Floor Chart, European Top 20, MTV's Greatest Hits, Dial MTV
- Paul King (1989–1994) MTV's Greatest Hits, 120 Minutes, MTV News, Morning Mix, HitList UK, XPO, First Look, Dial MTV
- Pip Dann (1988–1994) MTV Prime, Post Modern, MTV at the Movies, The Big Picture, Dial MTV, Music Non Stop, European Top 20, HitList UK, XPO, MTV's Greatest Hits, MTV Coca-Cola Report, MTV News, First Look, RockBlock
- Maiken Wexø (1987–1992; 1993) Pure Pop, MTV Coca-Cola Report, European Top 20, MTV News, XPO, MTV Prime
- Marcel Vanthilt (1987–1990; 1991) Cokes & Vanthilt, 120 Minutes, XPO, Most Wanted
- Sophie Bramly (1987–1991) Yo! MTV Raps
- Chris Salewicz (1987–1993) MTV News, Reverb
- Nunu (1990) Awake on the Wild Side
- Sonya Saul (1990–1992) MTV News, XPO
- Terry Christian (1991) XPO, Morning Mix
- Richie Rich (1993–1994) The Soul of MTV, MTV's Greatest Hits, HitList UK
- John Dunton-Downer (1987–1997) 120 Minutes, The Big Picture (producer)
- Steve Blame (1987–1994) MTV News, Reverb, Take the Blame, Pure Pop, MTV Coca-Cola Report, First Look
- Vanessa Warwick (1990–1997) Headbangers Ball, RockBlock
- Kristiane Backer (1989–1996) European Top 20, MTV Coca-Cola Report, MTV's Greatest Hits, Awake on the Wild Side, XPO, Party Zone, Headbangers Ball, RockBlock, MTV at the Movies
- Rebecca de Ruvo (1991–1995) Dial MTV, Awake on the Wild Side, MTV Prime, European Top 20
- Marijne van der Vlugt (1991–1996; 2013; 2015; 2016) The Pulse, MTV Coca-Cola Report, Alternative Nation, 120 Minutes, Post Modern, European Top 20, Dial MTV, Music Non Stop, MTV Europe Music Awards 2013-2015-2016-2022 (voice-over)
- Davina McCall (1987; 1992–1998) Hanging Out, HitList UK, MTV Coca-Cola Report, MTV's Greatest Hits, European Top 20, First Look, Music Non Stop, Most Wanted, Party Zone, MTV Dance, Cinematic, Singled Out, The End?
- Lisa I'Anson (1993–1996) The Soul of MTV, MTV News, HitList UK, Hanging Out, European Top 20, Music Non Stop, Party Zone
- Ingo Schmoll (1993–1996) Morning Mix, MTV News, First Look, MTV's Greatest Hits, European Top 20
- Enrico Silvestrin (1993–1997) Select MTV, Hanging Out, European Top 20, Dial MTV
- Hugo de Campos (1994–1997) Stylissimo, Dial MTV, European Top 20, Music Non Stop, First Look, Hanging Out, The End?
- Maria Guzenina (1994–1997) KickStart, Awake on the Wild Side, Morning Mix, Music Non Stop, European Top 20, MTV's Greatest Hits, MTV Amour, MTV at the Movies
- Carolyn Lilipaly (1994–1998) MTV News, HitList UK, The Big Picture, MTV Winter Parties
- Miles Hunt (1994–1995) 120 Minutes
- John Kearns (1995–2012) MTV News, The Big Picture, MTV Europe Music Awards (voice-over)
- Toby Amies (1995–1999) Alternative Nation, MTV News, MTV Hot
- Eden Harel (1995–2000) European Top 20, Select MTV, Dance Floor Chart, Hanging Out, Dial MTV
- Kimsy von Reischach (1995–1998) First Look, European Top 20, MTV's Greatest Hits, MTV Winter Parties, Hanging Out
- Julia Valet (1996–1997) Superock, MTV Hot
- Nikolai (1996–1997) MTV's Greatest Hits, European Top 20, HitList UK, Morning Mix
- Boris (1996–1997) European Top 20, MTV Snowball, First Look
- Christian Ulmen (1996–1997) MTV Hot
- Crispin Somerville (1996–1997) Select MTV, HitList UK, Hanging Out
- Camila Raznovich (1996–1998) MTV Amour, Hanging Out, MTV Summer Festivals, MTV Beach House
- Lily Myrhed (1996–1998) HitList UK, MTV Winter Parties, Awake on the Wild Side, Morning Mix
- Lars Oostveen "Vico" (1996–1999) Select MTV, Dial MTV
- Thomas Madvig (1996–1999) Select MTV, MTV News
- Katja Schuurman (1997–2000) So 90's
- Melanie Sykes (1997) HitList UK
- Cat Deeley (1997–2002) HitList UK, Stylissimo, MTV News, MTV Amour, Dance Floor Chart
- Ulrika Eriksson (1998–2003) MTV News, Select MTV, HitList UK, Nordic Top 5, MTV:New, Morning Glory
- Kicki Berg (1998–2006) MTV News, Select MTV, European Top 20, Nordic Top 5, Dance Floor Chart, Top Selection, MTV Supermercado
- Trevor Nelson (1998–2004) The Lick
- Trey Farley (1999–2000) Select MTV, MTV News
- Lars Beckung (1999–2006) MTV:New, Select MTV, Nordic Top 5, MTV News, Morning Glory, MTV Source, This Is Our Music
- Neil Cole (2000–2004) The Fridge, MTV News, Select MTV, European Top 20, World Chart Express, MTV:New
- Joanne Colan (2000–2004) MTV News, European Top 20, MTV Movie Special, Select MTV, MTV:New, MTV Top 20 Countdown, MTV's Winterjam, MTV Presents
- Fleur van der Kieft (2000–2002) Top Selection, Select MTV
- Frederique Bedos (2001) Select MTV
- Erickka Jones (2001) MTV Top 20 Countdown
- Mimi Kalinda (2001–2002) Dance Floor Chart, World Chart Express, Top Selection, Select MTV, The Fridge
- Ina Geraldine (2003–2004) Euro Top 20
- Becky Griffin (2003–2005) Dance Floor Chart, World Chart Express
- Amelia Hoy (2004–2005) Euro Top 20, Up North
- Axl Smith (2004–2007) Spanking New, Axl Meets, MTV at the Festivals
- Pernille Fals Bahrt (2005–2007) MTV News
- Archie Archibald (2005–2006) MTV News
- Charlotte Thorstvedt (2005–2009) Euro Top 20, Spanking New
- Jason Danino-Holt (2006) Switched On
- Shire Raghe (2006–2009) MTV News, SuperStar Saturday
- Freya Clausen (2007–2009) Fahrenheit, Spanking New, MTV News, MTV Source
- Janika Nieminen (2008–2010) MTV Overdrive, SuperStar Saturday
- Matthew Bailey (2009–2010) Euro Top 20

== See also ==
- MTV Live – MTV Networks' international high-definition television channel.
