= Alternative Nation =

- Presented by: Kennedy
- Country of origin: United States
- Original language: English

Production
- Running time: 60 minutes (1992–1994; 1996–1997); 90 minutes (1994–1996)

Original release
- Network: MTV
- Release: November 1992 – March 1997

Alternative Nation is an American television show dedicated to alternative music. It aired on MTV from 1992 to 1997, mostly on weeknights. It was hosted by Kennedy.

== History ==
Alternative Nation began airing in 1992. It was a somewhat more mainstream version of sister-show 120 Minutes. While the latter aired videos by more diverse artists, such as Pixies, The Cure, The Jesus and Mary Chain, Bronski Beat, New Order, The Replacements, Robyn Hitchcock, Meat Puppets, Butthole Surfers, and The Verve, Alternative Nation focused primarily on the alternative hits of the day, including videos by Smashing Pumpkins, Nirvana, Stone Temple Pilots, Soundgarden, Alice in Chains, Pearl Jam, Hole, Blind Melon, Weezer, Bush, and Oasis, among others.

MTV Adria (South-Eastern Europe) was the last of the MTV channels to schedule the show, where it was scheduled until September 17, 2017 before getting revived on MTV Germany in January 2023.

== List of Hosts ==
- Kennedy (1992–97)

== See also ==
- Superock
