= List of MTV video jockeys =

This is a list of people who have been video jockeys on the music channel MTV.

Originally hired to represent a wide array of musical tastes and personal ethnicities, VJs eventually became famous in their own right. Initially, they were nothing more than on-air personalities, but as the popularity of MTV grew, they began to branch out past just introducing music clips. Soon, they were considered by many to be full-fledged music journalists, interviewing major music celebrities and hosting their own television shows on the channel.

== MTV U.S. ==
=== Former VJs ===
==== MTV ====
- John Ales
- Serena Altschul
- Michael Alvarez
- Toby Amies
- Adrienne Bailon
- Bill Bellamy
- Aurelia Bilen
- Nina Blackwood
- Chris Booker
- Downtown Julie Brown
- Karyn Bryant
- Hilarie Burton
- Jesse Camp
- Susie Castillo
- Lenay Chantelle
- Stephen Colletti
- Dan Cortese
- Ann Marie Curren
- Adam Curry
- Thalia DaCosta
- Andrew Daddo
- Carson Daly
- Idalis DeLeon
- Karen Duffy
- DJ Clue
- DJ Skribble
- Doctor Dré
- Carmen Electra
- Damien Fahey
- Daisy Fuentes
- Funkmaster Flex
- Fab 5 Freddy
- Abby Gennet
- Mark Goodman
- Carolyne Heldman
- K.K. Holiday
- Dave Holmes
- Teck Holmes
- Alan Hunter
- Nadya Hutagalung
- Steve Isaacs
- J. J. Jackson
- China Kantner
- Tim Kash
- Dave Kendall
- Kennedy
- Mandy Lauderdale
- Lewis Largent
- Ananda Lewis
- Laura Lifshitz
- Ed Lover
- Steve Masters
- Brian McFayden
- Vanessa Minnillo
- Mandy Moore
- Ray Munns
- John Norris
- Erik Palladino
- Matt Pinfield
- Quddus
- Colin Quinn
- Martha Quinn
- Riki Rachtman
- Simon Rex
- Lyndsey Rodrigues
- Maria Sansone
- Kevin Seal
- John Sencio
- Jim Shearer
- Pauly Shore
- Ashlee Simpson
- Tim Sommer
- Cipha Sounds
- Alison Stewart
- Rachel Sweet
- Tyrese
- La La Vasquez
- Kari Wührer
- Dweezil Zappa
- Peter Zaremba

==== MTV News ====
A list of people who were MTV News on-site or digital personalities.

- Serena Altschul
- Andrew Babel
- Lauren Black
- Sway Calloway
- Jim Cantiello
- Chris Connelly
- Ana Marie Cox
- Christina Garibaldi
- Mark Goodman
- Carolyne Heldman
- Liz Hernandez (MTV & MTV Tr3s)
- Josh Horowitz
- Tim Kash
- John Kearns
- Yoonj Kim
- Kurt Loder
- Brian McFayden
- Brian "B. Dot" Miller
- John Norris
- SuChin Pak
- Heather Parry
- Dometi Pongo
- Iann Robinson
- Tabitha Soren
- Jamil Smith
- Alison Stewart
- Kim Stolz
- Gaby Wilson
- Gideon Yago
- Nick Zano

==== MTV 2 ====
- Chris Booker
- DJ Envy
- Jancee Dunn
- Jim Shearer
- Kris Kosach

==== MTVU ====
- Carly Henderson
- Gardner Loulan
- George Oliphant
- Sophia Parola
- Kim Stolz
- Sarah Messer
- Josh McCutchen

==== MTV Chi ====
- Angel Tang

==== MTV Desi ====
- Niharika Desai
- Tim Kash
- Utkarsh Ambudkar

==== MHD ====
- George Oliphant
- Jeremy Bloom

==== MTV K ====
- Grace Subervi

== MTV Europe ==
=== Past VJs ===
- Ray Cokes
- Maiken Wexø
- Simone Angel
- Paul King
- Marcel Vanthilt
- Enrico Silvestrin
- Chris Salewicz
- Downtown Julie Brown
- Jasmine Dotiwala
- Terry Christian
- Sonya Saul
- Rebecca de Ruvo
- Steve Blame
- Pip Dann
- Kristiane Backer
- Marijne van der Vlugt
- Davina McCall
- Lisa I'Anson
- Maria Guzenina
- Carolyn Lilipaly
- Miles Hunt
- Toby Amies
- Eden Harel
- Christian Ulmen
- Lars Oostveen
- Katja Schuurman
- Melanie Sykes
- Cat Deeley
- Tim Kash
- Trevor Nelson
- Trey Farley
- Kelly Brook
- Neil Cole
- Joanne Colan
- Becky Griffin
- Jason Danino-Holt
- Ulrika Eriksson
- Ina Geraldine
- Laura Whitmore
- Amelia Hoy
- Charlotte Thorstvedt
- Thomas Madvig

== MTV Asia ==
Includes the Philippines, Indonesia, Singapore, Malaysia, Thailand, India, Hong Kong, Taiwan and Vietnam.

=== Former VJs ===
- Richard Herrera (Philippines)
- Ruth Winona Tao (Hong Kong) later moved to Channel V
- David Wu – (Hong Kong) later moved to Channel V
- Angela Chow (Taiwan) – later moved to Channel V
- Nadya Hutagalung (Indonesia)
- Kamal Sidhu (India) - Originally from Channel V later moved to MTV Asia/MTV India
- Raageshwari Loomba (India) - Original VJ of the first Incarnation of MTV Asia, moved to Channel V and moved back to MTV Asia/MTV India (Second Incarnation)
- Rahul Khanna (India)
- Regine Maristela (Tolentino) (Philippines)
- Donita Rose (Philippines)
- Sally Yeh (Taiwan)
- Utt Panichkul (Thailand)
- Cyrus Broacha (India)
- Sonia Couling (Thailand)
- Jamie Aditya (Indonesia)
- Mike Kasem (USA)
- Alex Abbad (Indonesia)
- Nur Fazura (Malaysia)
- G. Toengi (Philippines)
- Jeremiah Odra (Philippines)
- Max Loong (Malaysia)
- Francis Magalona (Philippines)
- K. C. Montero (Philippines)
- Cindy Kurleto (Philippines)
- Sarah Meier (Philippines)
- Jeff Enos (Thailand)
- Holly Graberak (Singapore)
- Colby Miller (Philippines)
- May Wan (Malaysia)
- Choy Wan (Malaysia)
- Belinda Panelo (Philippines)
- Sarah Sechan – (Indonesia)
- Denise Keller (Singapore)
- Sophiya Haque (UK)
- Jamie Wilson (Philippines)
- Mariel Rodriguez (Philippines)
- Sharon Gomes Thomas - MTV News
- Alan M. Wong (Singapore) - MTV
- Rita Tsang (British Chinese)- MTV News
- Daniel Mananta (Indonesia)
- Belinda Lee Xin Yu (Singapore)
- Danny McGill (USA) Original VJ of the first Incarnation of MTV Asia, moved to Channel V and moved back to MTV Asia/MTV India (Second Incarnation)
- Anu Kottoor (India)
- Zarina Safuan (Singapore)
- Tony Cheng

== MTV Australia ==
=== Former VJs ===
- Kyle Sandilands
- Lyndsey Rodrigues
- Jason Dundas
- Richard Wilkins
- Ruby Rose
- Erin McNaught
- Keiynan Lonsdale

== MTV India ==
=== Former VJs ===
- Akasa Singh (MTV Beats)
- Amrita Arora
- Anusha Dandekar
- Ayushmann Khurrana
- Gaelyn Mendonca
- Bani J
- Baseer Ali
- Benafsha Soonwalla
- Cyrus Broacha
- Cyrus Sahukar
- Deepti Gujral
- José Covaco
- Malaika Arora
- Maria Goretti
- Mia Uyeda
- Mini Mathur
- Nafisa Joseph
- Nikhil Chinapa
- Raageshwari Loomba
- Ramona Arena
- Rannvijay Singh
- Rhea Chakraborty
- Shenaz Treasury
- Siddharth Bhardwaj
- Sophie Choudry
- Sunanda Wong
- Varun Sood (actor)

== MTV Netherlands ==
=== Former VJs ===
- Sander Lantinga
- Fleur van de Kieft
- Tooske Breugem
- Katja Schuurman
- Simone Angel
- Sylvie Meis
- Johnny de Mol
- Erik de Zwart
- Carolyn Lilipaly
- Marijne van der Vlugt

== MTV Pakistan ==
=== Former VJs ===
- Saira Yousuf
- Palwasha Yousuf
- Mawra Hocane
- Urwa Hocane
- Anoushey Ashraf
- Mahira Khan
- Madiha Imam
- Faizan
- Fiza Ali
- Ayesha Omar
- Ali Safina
- Dr Ali Munir
- Dino Ali
- Wiqar Ali Khan

== MTV Philippines ==
=== Former VJs ===
- Victor Basa
- Anne Curtis
- Margaret Nales Wilson
- Kat Alano
- Sib Sibulo
- Andi Manzano
- Marc Abaya
- Jean Irish Kasayan
- Paolo Bediones
- KC Concepcion
- Maike Evers
- Nicole Fonacier
- Cindy Kurleto
- Francis Magalona
- Sarah Meier
- Colby Miller
- K. C. Montero
- Belinda Panelo
- Derek Ramsay
- Mariel Rodriguez
- Giselle Toengi
- Yassi Pressman
- Andre Paras
- Shy Carlos
- Sam Pinto
- Josh Padilla
- Kito Romualdez
- Katarina Rodriguez
- Allen Nicole Angats
- Jess Connely
- Jodie Tarasek
- Markus Paterson

== MTV Indonesia ==
=== Former VJs ===
- Alblen Filindo Fabe
- Arie Untung
- Ben Kasyafani
- Boy William
- Cathy Sharon
- Daniel Mananta
- Dewi Rezer
- Eddi Brokoli
- Evan Sanders
- Feli Sumayku
- Fikri Ramadhan
- Jamie Aditya
- Marissa Nasution
- Mike Muliardo
- Millane Fernandez
- Nadya Hutagalung
- Nirina Zubir
- Rianti Cartwright
- Sarah Sechan
- Shanty
- Vina Yuanna

== MTV Thailand ==
=== Former VJs ===
- Michele Waagaard
- Sonia Couling
- Garanick (Nicky) Thongpiam
- Poomjai (Poom) Thangsanga
- Chompoonut (Alex) Sawaetwong
- Janesuda (Jane) Parnto
- Jay Ploadpai

== MTV Korea ==
=== Current VJs ===
- Seorak

== MTV Taiwan ==
=== Past VJs ===
- Linda Liao

== MTV Brasil ==
=== Current VJs ===
- Beatriz Coelho
- Spartakus Santiago

=== Past VJs ===
- Fernanda Lima
- Marcos Mion
- Marina Person
- Monique Olsen
- Luisa Micheletti
- Carla Lamarca
- Adriane Galisteu
- Marcio Garcia
- Babi Xavier
- João Gordo
- André Vasco
- Mariana Weickert
- Madame Mim
- Ferrugem
- Marcelo Tas
- Kid Vinil
- Maria Fernanda Cândido
- Hermes & Renato (comedy troupe)
- Adriana Lessa
- Fernando Meligeni
- Gisele Bündchen
- Jimmy London
- Luana Piovani
- Rita Lee
- Fernanda Tavares
- Rodrigo Leão
- Kika Martinez
- Sophia Reis
- Leo Madeira
- Penélope Nova
- Ronaldo Lemos
- Nasi
- Emicida
- Arnaldo Antunes
- Ellen Jabour
- Bento Ribeiro
- Bruno Sutter
- Cazé Peçanha
- Dani Calabresa
- Daniela Cicarelli
- Marcelo Adnet
- Tatá Werneck
- MariMoon
- Titi Müller
- Chuck Hipolitho
- Didi Effe
- Juliano Enrico
- Maria Eugênia Suconic
- Michelli Provensi
- Becca Pires
- Lucas Maciel
- Mariana Nery
- Olavo Junqueira
- Gui Araújo

== MTV Africa ==
=== Current VJs ===
- Nenny B

Tshego Wolf Koke (South Africa) Nomuzi Mabhena (South Africa)

Ehiz (Nigeria)

== MTV Germany ==
=== Current VJs ===
- Markus Kavka
- Joko Winterscheidt
- Hadnet Tesfai
- Klaas Heufer-Umlauf
- Palina Rojinski

=== Past VJs ===
- Patrice Bouédibéla
- Sarah Kuttner
- Mirjam Weichselbraun
- Christian Ulmen
- Nora Tschirner
- Anastasia Zampounidis
- Caroline Korneli
- Simone Angel
- Claudia Hiersche
- Johanna Klum
- Nandini Mitra
- Jana Pallaske
- Tom Novy
- Ben Tewaag
- Markus Schultze
- Max von Thun
- Peter Imhof
- Benjamin von Stuckrad-Barre
- Christoph Schlingensief
- Holger Speckhahn
- Sophie Rosentreter
- Simon Krätschmer
- Daniel Budiman

== MTV Russia ==
=== Past VJs ===
- Ivan Urgant
- Yana Churikova
- Vasily Strelnikov
- Aleksandr Anatolievich
- Tutta Larsen
- Irena Ponaroshku

== MTV Italy ==
=== Current VJs ===
- Alessandro Cattelan
- Carmen Electra
- Elena Santarelli
- Elisabetta Canalis
- Marco Maccarini
- Victoria Cabello
- Zero Assoluto

=== Past VJs ===
- Daniele Bossari
- Ambra Angiolini
- Fabio Volo
- Gemelli Diversi
- Giorgia Surina
- Giorgio Pasotti
- Mao
- Valeria Bilello

== MTV Latin America ==
=== Current VJs ===
- Belén "Belu" Drugueri
- Barbara Mou

=== Past VJs ===
- Marisabel Bazan
- Daisy Fuentes
- Ruth Infarinato
- Alfredo Lewin
- Gonzalo Morales
- Lolita Santos
- Edith Serrano
- Arturo Hernández
- Alejandro LaCroix
- Leandro O'Brien
- Javier Andrade
- Carmen Arce
- Monica Carranza
- Corina González Tejedor
- Eduardo "Pocas" Peñafiel
- Sebastián "Berta" Muñiz
- Ursula Eggers
- Eglantina Zingg
- Matilda Svensson
- Ilana Sod
- Erich Martino "Koggi"
- Alexis Yasky
- Gabriel "Gabo" Ramos Villalpando
- Mikki Lusardi
- Cawi Blaksley
- Maria Camila Giraldo
- Ivana Nadal
- Grego Rossello
- Lizardo Ponce
- Manu Viale
- Pamela Voguel
- Manuela "Jekill" Botero
- Dhasia Wezka
- Tonka Tomicic
- Jimmy Sirvant

== MTV Bangladesh ==
=== Current VJs ===
- Yazdani

== MTV Canada ==
=== Current VJs ===
- Daryn Jones
- Nicole Holness
- Aliya-Jasmine Sovani
- Johnny Hockin
- Sharlene Chiu
- Lenay Dunn

=== Former VJs ===
- Gilson Lubin
- Jessi Cruickshank
- Lauren Toyota
- Dan Levy

== MTV Ukraine ==
=== Former VJs ===
- Irena Karpa
- Avdey

== MTV Estonia ==
=== Former VJs ===
- Piret Järvis
- Martin Veisman

== MTV Vietnam ==
=== Current VJs ===
- Đoàn Ngọc Nhi

=== Former VJs ===
- Misoa Kim Anh
- Nguyễn Đỗ Quỳnh Chi
- Nguyễn Tấn Đăng Khoa
- Jackie Njine (Tiêu Chấn Huy)
- Kaylee Tú Linh
- Nina
- Dustin Phúc Nguyễn
- Nguyễn Sỹ Anh Vũ
