= Andi Manzano =

Filipina actor and broadcaster

Andi Manzano Reyes
- Born: Andrea Bianca Martin Manzano; March 29, 1987 (age 39)
- Other name: Andi 9
- Education: Miriam College
- Occupations: Radio personality, television host, momfluencer
- Years active: 2001–present
- Agent: Star Magic (2000–2003)
- Spouse: GP Reyes (m. 2013)
- Children: 3
- Relatives: Edu Manzano (uncle); Luis Manzano (cousin)
- Website: Official website

Andrea Bianca "Andi" Martin Manzano Reyes (born March 29, 1987) is a Filipina radio and television personality and momfluencer. In the early 2000s, she worked as a video jockey (VJ) for MTV and Myx and as a DJ for Magic 89.9. Since then, she has cohosted several radio shows, including Good Times with Mo and The Mother Show, and has grown her social media presence through vlogging about early motherhood and her family.

== Early life and career ==
Manzano was born on March 29, 1987, to Bobit Manzano and Rose Martin-Manzano and is the oldest of five children. She studied Communication Arts at Miriam College in the early days of her radio career. Her father is the second cousin of Edu Manzano, making Luis Manzano one of her cousins.

Manzano was part of Star Circle Batch 10 in 2001 with talents such as Bea Alonzo, Dennis Trillo, Alfred Vargas, and Nadine Samonte. In 2007/2008, she was the courtside reporter for the FEU Tamaraws during the UAAP's 70th season. She won the MTV VJ Hunt in 2007 alongside Kat Alano and Sib Sibulo and hosted various programs for MTV until 2009. In 2009, she was a host on MyPetChannel.tv.

In 2010, she became the new host of Party Pilipinas with Ellen Adarna and Gwen Zamora. After becoming a mother in 2015, she stepped back from radio broadcasting to devote time to her family and turned her focus to vlogging. In 2017, she, Delamar Arias, and Riki Flores started The Mother Show on Magic 89.9. In 2021, she owned two businesses: Incy Rooms, a kids' furniture store, and A-Meal-Ya's Family Favorites, a food business delivered through GrabFood during the COVID-19 lockdown. In 2023, she was introduced as the first brand ambassador for Mama’s Choice Philippines.

== Personal life ==
Manzano and GP Reyes, a publicist and bar owner, married in Baguio on November 12, 2013. The couple first connected online via Facebook in December 2010 (with their first digital message sent around December 17, 2010) and met in person shortly after at Barcino in Greenbelt 2, Makati. Some biographical notes also note they first crossed paths or were introduced around December 2010 through Luis Manzano. They have three daughters: Olivia, born March 20, 2015; Amelia, born January 19, 2019; and Lucia, born May 11, 2023. Manzano's mother was diagnosed with cervical cancer five months before Manzano's wedding but has since gone into remission. Manzano is now an advocate for prevention methods including the HPV vaccine.

== Filmography ==
- Ang TV 2 (2001) - Self
- Candies (2005-2006) - Self
- Good Times (2008-?) - Self
- Q Tube (2009) - Self; with co-host Andy Smith
- Party Pilipinas (2010-2011) - Self
- Unofficially Yours (2012) - Iya
- All-Out Sundays (?) - Self
- Sunday PinaSaya (?) - Self
- Wasak (?) - Self
- Sunday All Stars (?) - Self
- ASAP Natin To (?) - Self

== Radio ==
- Good Times with Mo (2007-2010) with Mo Twister and Mojo Jojo
- Magic Top 5 at 5 (2010/2011-?) with Jessica Mendoza
- The Mother Show (2017-?) with Riki Flores and Delamar Arias
