= Kayley Carrigan =

Filipino stuntwoman and actor (born 1994)

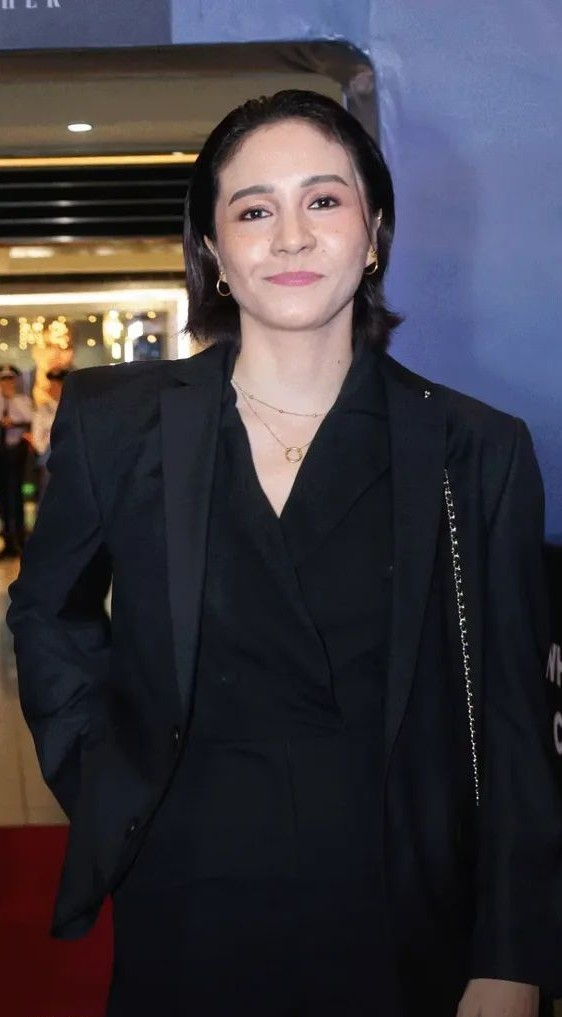
- Carrigan at the premiere of Pater Noster (Our Father) in 2026.
- Born: Kaira Venus Ebora Capito; 7 December 1994 (age 31); Sta. Cruz, Manila, Philippines
- Education: ICCT Colleges
- Occupations: Stuntwoman; Actor; Fight Director; former Dancer & Choreographer; former Independent Wrestler
- Years active: 2015–present (Stuntwoman & Actor); 2018–2019 (Independent Wrestler); 2006–2016 (Dancer & Choreographer)

Kaira Venus Ebora Capito (born December 7, 1994), known professionally as Kayley Carrigan, is a Filipino stuntwoman and actor. She made her screen debut in GMA Network's Encantadia (2016), and is recognized for her stunt work in films and television series such as BuyBust, Maria, Shake, Rattle & Roll Extreme, FPJ's Batang Quiapo and Encantadia Chronicles: Sang'gre. Making her one of the most notable faces in the Philippines' stunt community. In 2026, she portrayed as Catherine Mesias in her first major family drama action film Pater Noster (Our Father).

== Early life and education ==
Kaira Venus Ebora Capito was born on December 7, 1994, in Sta. Cruz, Manila. She is the youngest of four siblings. Her father is a retired employee, and her mother teaches nursing. At the age of 6, she discovered her first love of dancing.

Carrigan studied high school at Juan Sumulong Memorial Junior College and graduated in 2011. During high school, she doubted joining the Taekwondo club, despite having taken lessons in Physical Education since grade school and even having participated once in an inter-school sports competition in Rizal. However, after giving it some thought, she followed her passion and joined the JSMJC Theater Arts (now known as the Sumulong Dance Company).

Carrigan graduated from ICCT Colleges with a Bachelor of Science in Information Technology degree in 2014. She became a member, dancer, and choreographer of the ICCT SIBOL Theatrical Group (SIBOL acronym as Saliw ng mga Istilong Bago at Orihinal na Likha/transl. Accompaniment of New Style and Original Creation).

== Career ==
=== Dance ===
After graduating from college, Carrigan pursued her passion for dance by joining IOX Entertainment (formerly known as Powered iOX Dancers). She performed with the group at various events and dance competitions throughout Luzon. At 21, after establishing herself as a professional dancer, she took an extended hiatus from performing.

Carrigan is skilled in a variety of dance styles, including hip-hop, krump, jazz funk, vogue, waacking, cultural dance, Broadway jazz, and contemporary ballet.

=== Stunts and acting ===
While participating for the first time as a background talent on TV5's drama fantasy anthology series LolaBasyang.com (a modern adaptation of Mga Kuwento ni Lola Basyang), Carrigan was discovered by a veteran stuntman and fight director, Benzon Dalina. Her athletic physique and dance skills impressed him, leading him to offer her the opportunity to train in stunts and cinematic fight scenes. She trained in multiple martial arts and combat sports, including Boxing, Kickboxing, Muay Thai and Eskrima.

After a few months, she was able to kickstart her career in stunts and acting in the entertainment industry. Her first project was the 2016 TV series Encantadia. She then went on to work for other TV shows such as Maynila, Mars Ravelo's Darna, Voltes V: Legacy, FPJ's Batang Quiapo, and Encantadia Chronicles: Sang'gre. She also worked in several films like BuyBust, Maria, Day Zero, and Shake, Rattle & Roll Extreme.

Carrigan worked as an action choreographer for Chocolate Factory's music video "Paglipad" (transl. Flight) featuring Gloc-9, which was released on their YouTube channel. On the 14th Anniversary of It's Showtime's Magpasikat 2023, she served as stunt choreographer for Team KALM. Karylle had a fight scene alongside her co-stars in Encantadia (2005 TV series). Their reunion became a trending topic on social media.

In August 2024, Carrigan, along with her Topakk co-star, Ian Lee, and their fellow stunt artists, started their action design company, Elite Action Design.

Carrigan co-starred in Topakk. The film was first screened at the 78th Cannes Film Festival in France, premiered at the 76th Locarno Film Festival in Switzerland, was officially selected and won 3 awards (Best Float, Fernando Poe Jr. Memorial Award for Excellence and Special Jury Prize) in the 50th Metro Manila Film Festival.

Carrigan starred in her first major film, Pater Noster (Our Father) alongside Arron Villaflor and Archi Adamos. The film premiered in March 2026. An action family drama tells the story of maintaining the legacy and proving a chilling truth. In June 2026, The film was selected and won multiple awards (Best Drama, Best Director, Best Screenplay and Best Lighting) in Creation International Film Festival in Canada.

In April 2026, Carrigan co-starred in the short film Kaya (transl. can, able to, or capable) which was directed, produced, and written by her co-star, Isabel Lamers. The film was officially selected for and premiered at the 25th anniversary of Tribeca Festival. Followed by Wyoming International Film Festival, OUTSOUTH Queer Film Festival, 22nd Annual HollyShorts Film Festival, and more.

=== Wrestling ===
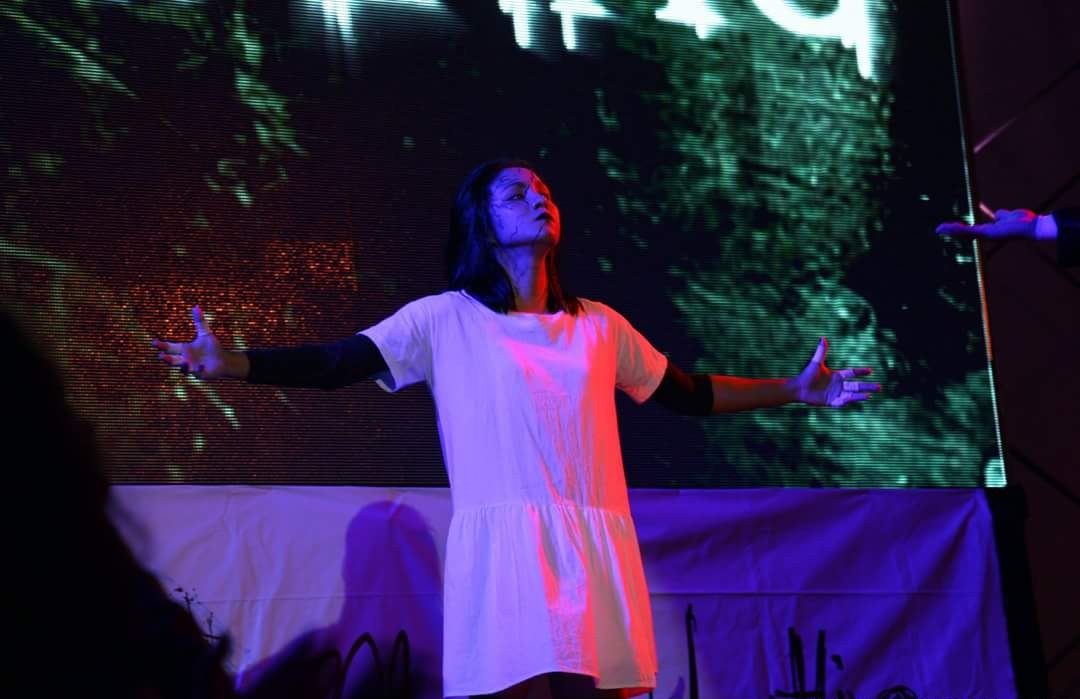
Carrigan as Jorelle Liwanag in the Manila Wrestling Federation.

During her stunt career in 2018, Carrigan underwent intensive wrestling training and became part of the roster of the Manila Wrestling Federation under the name Jorelle Liwanag. Her wrestling persona was a combination of a priestess and a white lady based on a well-known ghost story in the Philippines.

She stated that she is a big fan of Jeff Hardy, John Morrison, and Finn Balor.

=== Music ===
Carrigan published her EDM/Deep House music on her SoundCloud account under the name KVeC (an acronym of her real name) in 2014. Later, she changed her genre to Lo-Fi and released her music under the name WELCOMETOTHENEXTLEVEL in December 2020. She named herself after the slogan from the Sega Genesis video game console.

== Personal life ==
In July 2024, Carrigan drew attention online after being criticized by netizens over her appearance as Kim Domingo's stunt double in FPJ's Batang Quiapo. The criticism stemmed from an online post featuring behind-the-scenes footage of a fight sequence. Carrigan responded to the comments publicly, while fellow performers, friends, family, and supporters defended her professionalism as a stunt performer. She later thanked both her supporters and her critics, noting that the incident had contributed to an increase in her social-media following.

== Filmography ==
=== Film ===
Year	Title	Role(s)	Notes	Ref.
2017	Our Mighty Yaya	Virginia "Virgie" Redoble's stunt double	Credited as Kaira Venus Capito	
2018	BuyBust	Chongki's Gang		
2019	Maria	Maria's stunt double	Credited as Kaira Capito	
2019	Mission Unstapabol: The Don Identity	Samantha's stunt double		
2020	Block Z	Activist	Uncredited	
2022	Day Zero	Zombie		
2023	Ma'am Chief: Shakedown in Seoul	Olga Tentativa's stunt double		
2023	Shake, Rattle & Roll Extreme	Ingrid's stunt double ('Glitch'), Infected ('Rage')		
2024	Fuchsia Libre	Fighter 4/Miss Cindy	also as a Stunt Coach	
2024	Karma	Keana's stunt double	Uncredited	
2024	Topakk	Cora	also as Julia Montes's stunt double	
2025	Shake, Rattle & Roll Evil Origins	Cultist with shovel ('2025')	Uncredited	
2025	Ekis	fight director		
2025	Love You So Bad	fight director		
2026	Pater Noster (Our Father)	Catherine Mesias	Main role	
2026	Haunted Carnival	Knife Thrower		

=== Music videos ===
Year	Title	Artist	Role
2023	"Paglipad"	Chocolate Factory (feat. Gloc-9)	Action Choreographer

=== Series ===
Year	Title	Involved in			Role	Notes
Year	Title	Acting	Stunts	Other	Role	Notes
2015	Lolabasyang.com: Ako si Akong Ekit			Yes	Extra	
2016	Encantadia	Yes	Yes		Hathor Warrior/Carcero Warden	
2016	Sinungaling Mong Puso		Yes		Clara Pamintuan-Aguirre	Main Actress: Rhian Ramos
2016	Alyas Robinhood		Yes		Venus Torralba	Main Actress: Andrea Torres
2016	Maynila: Sana	Yes			Macky's rumored girlfriend	
2017	Maynila: Love Plus Two	Yes			Diza's friend	
2017	Super Ma'am		Yes		Ceres	Guest Actress: Carmina Villarroel
2017	Maynila: TapsiLove	Yes			Tappy's fangirl customer	
2018	La Luna Sangre		Yes		Vampire	
2018	Maynila: Ang Lihim ni Lea	Yes			Lea's mean girl classmate	
2018	Fist Fight		Yes		Chan Ling 陳鈴	Main Actress: Tiffany Lau
2019	Dahil sa Pag-ibig		Yes		Portia Reyes Kahlaf	Main Actress: Winwyn Marquez
2020	Eat Bulaga!			Yes	Herself	Segment: Bawal Judgmental
2020	24/7		Yes		Mia Agbayani	Main Actress: Julia Montes
2020	Kagat ng Dilim: Binabahayan	Yes	Yes		Ghost	
2021	Kagat ng Dilim: Sabel	Yes			Sabel's Monster Reflection	
2021	Ang Probinsyano		Yes		Maria Isabel "Mara" G. Hidalgo	Guest Actress: Julia Montes
2022-2023	Mars Ravelo's Darna		Yes		Luna	Guest Actress: Kira Balinger
2023	Voltes V: Legacy	Yes	Yes		EDF Castañeda	Credited as Kaira Venus Capito
2023	Walang Matigas na Pulis sa Matinik na Misis	Yes	Yes		Lady Goon	
2023	It's Showtime			Yes	Herself/Stunt Choreographer	Pagpasikat 2023: Team KALM
2024	FPJ's Batang Quiapo		Yes		Madonna	Guest Actress: Kim Domingo
2025	Sanggang Dikit FR		Yes		Bobby's Sparring Partner	
2025	Encantadia Chronicles: Sang'gre	Yes	Yes		Mine-a-ve Assassin	
2026	FPJ's Batang Quiapo	Yes	Yes		Jocie Abayon	

=== Short film ===
Year	Title	Role(s)	Ref.
2018	Low Blow Street: Shattered Dreams	Female Goon	
2018	Assassin One	Kaira	
2021	Kung Fu Girl vs. Kickboxing Girl	Kickboxing Girl	
2023	Cute Police vs. Tough Thief	Tough Thief	
2024	Unkillable	Rebel Woman	
2026	Kaya	Angel Bautista	

=== Web series ===
Year	Title	Role	Ref.
2025	The Analyst	Detective Jernigans	
