= Seorak =

South Korean singer

Seorak Park
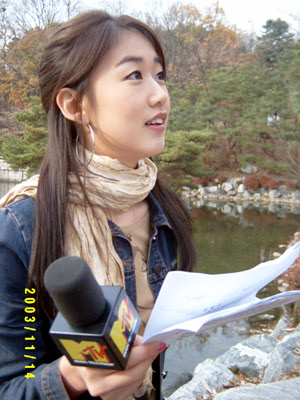
- Seorak in 2003, while she was working for MTV Korea

Background information
- Also known as: SeoRock
- Born: 박서락; December 26, 1981 (age 43)
- Occupation(s): Singer, video jockey

Seorak Park (Korean: 박서락; born December 26, 1981), also known by her stage name SeoRock, is a South Korean singer and former VJ for MTV Korea. She currently lives in Manhattan, New York and studies law. Seorak is one of the first Korean singers to successfully crossover from performing mainstream music to performing in musical theater (her talent in being the leading role of "Carmen" made the musical a super hit).

== Early life ==
Seorak was born in Seoul, South Korea. During her teenage years, she studied as an international student in Columbia, Missouri. After returning to South Korea, she studied at Sogang University, where she majored in Business Administration and graduated in the Class of 2001. Currently, Seorak lives in Manhattan, New York and studies law at the Benjamin N. Cardozo School of Law (Yeshiva University). After graduating in May 2010 with her J.D. and taking the NY Bar Exam in July 2010, she plans to make her comeback debut as a singer in South Korea or in the United States.

== Career ==
In August 2003, at the age of 22, Seorak released her first and only album, Looking for a Parking Spot, under the name "SeoRock". One of the more well-known songs on the album is "Yeong-wonhi" (영원히; lit. "Forever"). The album was successful, quickly entering Kyobo Hot Tracks' Top 10 Album Sales Chart. Seorak was invited to perform at big concerts all across the country, including but not limited to the New Year's Concert, Concert for Teenagers, the 60th Korean Independence Day Concert, Concert for Teenagers and Families, Charity Concert, Environmental Concert, Deoksu Palace Concert and many others. In addition to the show Live Wow MTV, Seorak has performed on other television program shows as well. During the same year, she also recorded a song on the OST album for the Korean drama Breathless.

After her big album hit, Seorak then served as a video jockey for MTV Korea in 2004. She is known for hosting the show Kayozine, which was broadcast all over Asia, including countries like China, Singapore and Malaysia.

In 2005, Seorak was invited to perform with Romanian musicians in Constanţa, Romania, where she was awarded the special diploma award by the Romanian Cultural Director in the Black Sea Summer Festival. During the same year, Seorak was cast as the lead female role in the musical Carmen, which was being shown at Little Angel's Art Center, of South Korea's leading art centers.

In 2006, she was featured in a song on the album Mr. Hong LP by Junki (준기).

== See also ==
- List of MTV VJs
