= MTV VJ Hunt =

Job application process

The MTV VJ Hunt is a search conducted by certain MTV channels in Asia for their respective channels' newest VJs.

== Indonesia ==
Year	Winner	Year active in MTV	Note
2003	Daniel Mananta	2003–2012	Host (Indonesian Idol and Asian Idol)
2004	Evan Sanders	2004–2007	Actor and singer
2005	Alblen Fillindo Fabe	2005–2006	Actor and presenter L A light freepas
2006	Vinna Yuanna	2006–2007	
2007	Millane Fernandez	2007–2008	Indonesian actress
2008	Rizky Triyantono	2008–2010	Indonesian presenter
2010	Sarah Jane	2010	Actress
2011	Eliza Sulaiman	2011–2012	
2014	Feli Sumayku	2014 - 2015	Indonesian radio announcer.

MTV VJ Hunt Indonesia in 2014 was the last VJ Hunt competition in the country as the MTV license for Indonesia was cut because of economic reasons (albeit MTV Indonesia is closed first in 2012 because of some undisclosed reasons.). In MTV VJ Hunt Indonesia 2011, Haries Argareza (Arga) Harahap was chosen as the runner up and Andra Ziggie got the 3rd place.

== Philippines ==
The MTV VJ Hunt in the Philippines was held every two years, and has produced notable Filipino VJs. During the 2005 MTV VJ Hunt, instead of choosing the standard two winners, four winners were picked for the first time. One winner, Colby Miller became the first Philippine VJ Hunt winner to be hired by MTV Asia. During the whole duration of MTV Philippines, KC Montero became the longest active VJ Hunt winner.

=== 1997 ===
- Shannen Torres (1997–2000)
- Jamie Wilson (1997-1998)

=== 1999 ===
- KC Montero (1999–2007)
- Belinda Panelo (1999–2003)

=== 2001 ===
- Derek Ramsay (2001-2002)
- Anna Shier (2001–2003)

=== 2003 ===
- Patty Laurel (2003–2004)
- Johan Ekedum (2003)

=== 2005 ===
- Colby Miller (2005–2007)
- Nicole Fonacier (2005–2006)
- Claire Olivar (2005-2006)
- Don Puno (2005)

=== 2007 ===
- Kat Alano (2007-2009)
- Andi Manzano (2007–2009)
- Sib Sibulo (2007–2009)

== Vietnam ==
The first season of the search for a VJ on MTV Vietnam begins from July 15, 2012. Utt Panichkul (from MTV Asia) and former model Thúy Hạnh (from Vietnam) are the permanent judging members. They are joined hands by Holly Grabarek (MTV Asia), Thanh Bạch, music producer Huy Tuấn, Nguyễn Hải Phong, actress Ngọc Hiệp, actress Lê Khánh, and fashion designer Công Trí throughout 12 weeks.
