= Ray Munns =

American VJ and DJ

- Birth name: Raymond Lee Munns
- Born: March 11, 1980 (age 45); St. Charles, Missouri, United States
- Genres: Trance, K-pop
- Occupation(s): Video jockey, Disc jockey, music producer
- Labels: Kinetic Records; Funk Wax Recordings

Raymond "Ray" Lee Munns (born March 11, 1980) is a former MTV VJ and Trance DJ.

== MTV ==
In 2000, Munns beat out 10,000 other hopefuls to win the third annual Wanna Be a VJ contest. During the live show, Munns participated in a series of challenges a VJ would expect to encounter...from introducing videos to interviewing celebrities such as Method Man. At the end of the show, a debate was held between Munns and Shannon Wiseman who was in the lead. In the debate, Munns made a comment about MTV not needing any more Barbie Dolls. He was referring to the cookie cutter image of a VJ. The live studio audience went wild and Munns was awarded fifty one percent to Wiseman's forty nine percent.

Munns started his MTV career as Carson Daly's sidekick on TRL during the 2000 summer beach house. He also did a Wrigley's Big Red spot and appeared on The Late Late Show with Craig Kilborn. Within one week of his victory he was imitated by Chris Kattan on Saturday Night Live for having an infectious laugh. Munns second live interview came when Carson Daly had Shannon Elizabeth say hello to him on TRL.

After the summer beach house ended, Ray play fought and danced the Britney Spears dance for "Oops I Did It Again" with Jackie Chan on TRL. He was chosen by Time Warner and MTV to shoot five vignettes for the 2000 MTV VMA, and also started work as executive producer on his first mixed CD "Ray's House" for Kinetic Records.

On January 1, 2001, MTV debuted its new show TRL Presents: VJ for a Day. The live daytime program featured contestants battling for Munns' job. Some of the challenges included introducing videos and interacting with celebrities. After winning four times, a contestant would compete with Munns "Head to Head" for his job. After five "Head to Head" matches and hosting VJ for a Day for four months; Munns retained his job and left the show as the “People’s Champion.”

== Post MTV ==
After leaving MTV as a full-time VJ, Munns was named one of People Magazine’s "50 Most Eligible Bachelors". He was featured alongside Matt Damon, George Clooney, Ben Affleck, Josh Hartnett, and Russell Crowe. While taking a break from promoting and DJing for his album “Rays House;” he hosted the "Swordfish Movie Special" featuring Paul Oakenfold and Africa Bambaataa. Munns was also brought back as a guest judge on MTV when he was not busy DJing. In 2001, he was a judge at the Miss Teen USA awards. In 2024 Munns announced his partnership with Television executive producer, Gary DeFranco. Together they plan to launch a series of nostalgia projects.
