= Wanna Be a VJ =

American television series

- Logo of the third and final installment, 2000
- Genre: Reality television, talent competition
- Presented by: Carson Daly
- Starring: Jesse Camp; Dave Holmes; Ray Munns
- Country of origin: United States
- Original language: English
- No. of seasons: 3

Production
- Running time: 180 minutes
- Production company: MTV Productions

Original release
- Network: MTV
- Release: April 18, 1998 – May 1, 2000

Wanna Be a VJ was a show and contest on MTV in the United States. Contestants were selected from the crowd around MTV's Times Square office, and narrowed down via challenges testing the applicants' music knowledge and personality. Once narrowed down to six contestants, viewers were allowed to vote for contestants by telephone and on the Internet. The winner was awarded $25,000 and a one-year contract to be a veejay on Total Request Live. All three events were hosted by Carson Daly.

== Wanna Be a VJ (1998) ==
In the first Wanna Be a VJ contest Jesse Camp beat Dave Holmes. Holmes ended up hosting various shows on MTV until 2001.

Camp's unexpected victory caused many viewers to suspect foul play. The Village Voice ran an article in which a source, identified only by his online handle "UglyPig", claimed to have hacked the voting site, allowing him to vote more than 3,000 times.

== Wanna Be a VJ Too (1999) ==
The second Wanna Be a VJ contest was won by 21-year-old Thalia DaCosta, from Sunrise, Florida. Chicago-born actress and media personality Marisa Sullivan, 19 at the time, was a runner-up out of the 12 finalists chosen from 8,000 hopefuls around the country to compete live on TRL in Times Square.

== Wanna Be a VJ 3 (2000) ==
The third Wanna Be a VJ contest was won by Ray Munns.

Munns went on to defend his job five times on a live show entitled TRL Presents: VJ for a Day, where he and the contestants introduced the eleven through fifteen videos of TRL. Ray was the first ever half-Korean VJ (he is also a quarter-Irish and a quarter-English) and was the first contest winner to stay longer than a year at MTV.

The runner up, Shannon Wiseman of Dallas, North Carolina, became a co-host for UPN's Atlanta Tonight in 2004 and the host of NASCAR.COM's Post-Race Show in 2005.
