= Penelo =

Penelo may refer to:

- Penelo, a character in Final Fantasy XII
- Penelo (village), a village on Maré Island, New Caledonia

== See also ==
- Panelo
