= Simone Angel =

Dutch TV host

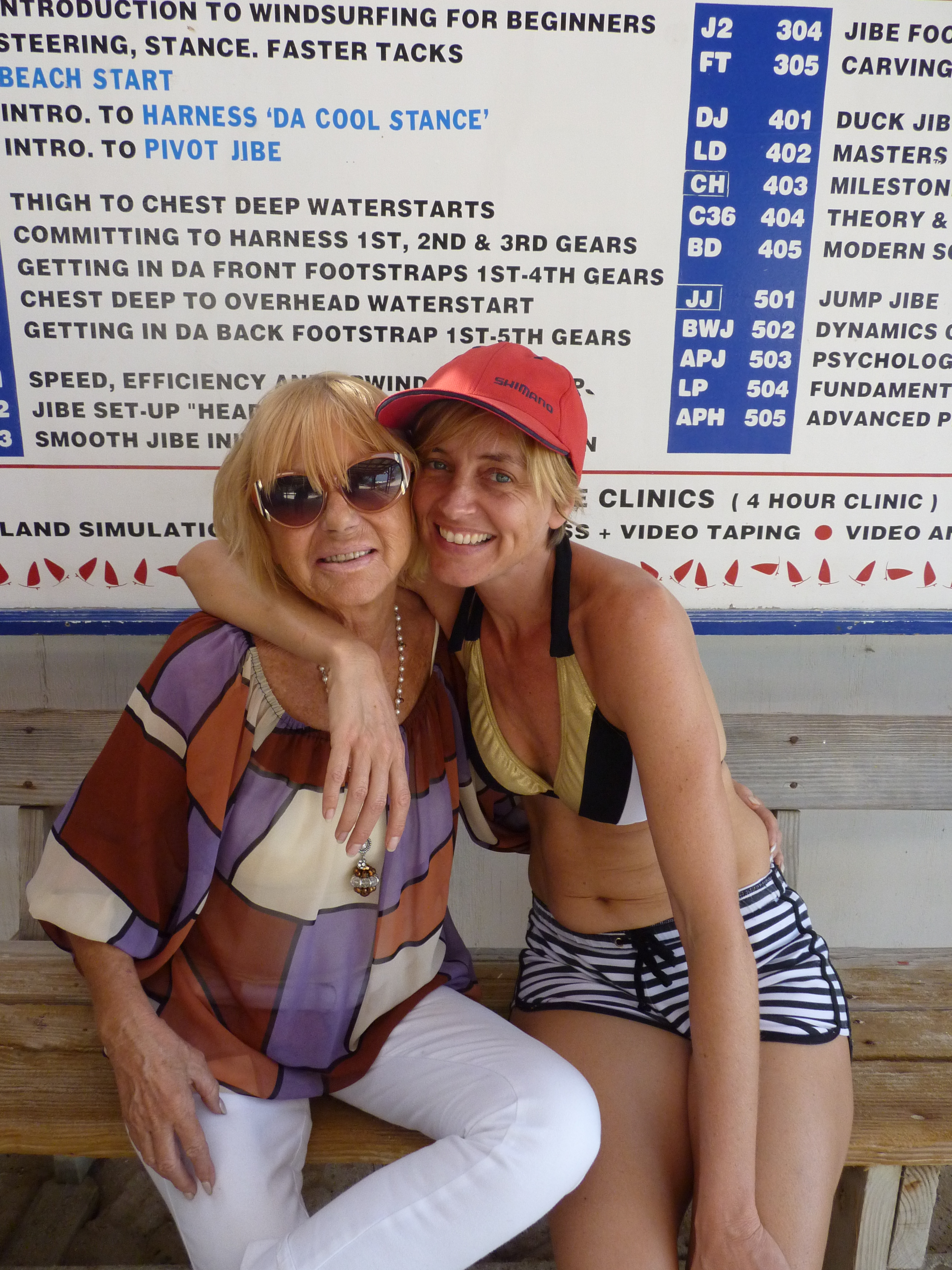
Simone Angel (right)

Simone Angel (born Simone Engeln, 25 December 1971) is a Dutch TV host.

== MTV ==
Born in Woerden, Netherlands, Angel moved from there to London, UK, when she was 18. Here she was hired by MTV Europe, becoming the youngest VJ and, after working for nine years, she also became one of the longest serving VJs for MTV. Angel was the host of many different programmes broadcast from various parts of the world, and was also the host of the MTV programme Party Zone, where she presented dance music videos.

== Discography ==
Angel released four singles, some in various versions. In the United Kingdom, Angel was signed to Bros/East 17 manager Tom Watkins' Atomic record label, alongside the band Nitro.

- "When Love Rules the World" (CD5" UK) (1991)
- "When Love Rules the World" (The Jon Marsh Sessions) (12" UK) (1991)
- "Let This Feeling" (12" UK, CD5" UK, 12" Italy) (1993) - UK #60, #8 Israel
- "Walk on Water" (CD5" UK, 2x12" UK) (1994), #8 Israel
- "Contact" (12" Netherlands)

== Other work ==
As well as hosting shows on MTV, Simone has also hosted various awards shows, such as the Webby Awards and some Extreme Sports Awards. She was also on the jury on the German TV show Popstars. Angel and Andy Hunt, former professional football player, own the Belize resort, 'Jungle Dome'. Angel is also working with a charity through the Jaden Foundation, aimed at improving the education for the children of Belize.

On 8 December 2005, Angel and Hunt were married. They continue to run the Belize Jungle Dome and have two children together, named Lucas and Aidan.
