= Tim Kash =

British television presenter

Tim Kash is a British television presenter best known for formerly presenting Top of the Pops in the United Kingdom, and MTV News on MTV UK and Ireland. He appeared on the U.S. edition of MTV News, and as a presenter on E! Network's Daily 10 and ENews!. He currently resides in between New York City, United States and Los Angeles, United States and is working as a presenter at IMDb and Amazon. On April 6 it was announced that he is the host of Quibi's new daily music show called 'POP 5' and 'Musicology with Tim Kash'.

== Life and career ==
=== Early career ===
After spending some time working in A&R, Kash was hired by MTV UK and Ireland to work as a VJ, and began presenting MTV News in the U.K. and Europe in 2003.

=== Top of the Pops ===
After joining MTV, Kash was offered the presenting role on the BBC's Top of the Pops. On 28 November 2003, Kash hosted his first episode of the show which coincided with one of its most radical overhauls in what was reported as a make-or-break attempt to revitalize the long-running series. Previously, the show had been presented by different people each week, but as part of the revamp Kash became the sole presenter. The BBC chose Kash for the position because of his youth, his prior success on MTV, and because they considered him a "edgy, quick-witted and talented presenter"; they hoped that all of these qualities would bring back the younger audience Top of the Pops used to have. Kash was later joined by co-presenters Fearne Cotton and Reggie Yates from April 2004. He left Top of the Pops permanently in August 2004, after presenting 38 editions.

=== MTV US ===
In 2007, Kash quit MTV UK to move to the US MTV station.

=== Philanthropy ===
Kash has been an Ambassador for the Prince's Trust, and a patron of Great Ormond Street Children's Hospital for 4 years and continues to work closely with them.

He is also an Ambassador for MTV's Staying Alive Foundation.

Kash launched the BOOM! Music Video Academy in 2004, an organization which teaches 11- to 18-year-old students the skills needed to produce music, videos, and short films. The academy has since been closed.
