= Kabarkada, Break the Bank =

- Genre: Game show
- Created by: Endemol
- Presented by: Mo Twister
- Country of origin: Philippines
- Original languages: Filipino; English
- No. of episodes: 90

Production
- Executive producer: Leo Katigbak
- Camera setup: Multiple-camera setup
- Running time: 1 hour

Original release
- Network: Studio 23
- Release: August 27 – December 28, 2007

Kabarkada, Break the Bank is a Philippine television game show broadcast by Studio 23. Hosted by Mo Twister. The show is spin-off and based from Kapamilya, Deal or No Deal. It aired from August 27 to December 28, 2007.

== Segments ==
=== Star Value ===
(Celebrity offer) A videotaped recording of a big star, popular celebrity/personality offers a prize to the contestant, which could be from her/his sponsors or endorsement products or her/his personal items.

=== Mo-ltiply ===
(derived from Mo's name - host) The unknown amount inside the suitcase is automatically multiplied up to five times its original value.

=== For-bidding Question ===
This segment is derived from the controversial and most talked about radio segment of DJ Twister, entitled "Forbidden Question". The caller answers a trivia question and can bid to add more money to the suitcase. Contestant can add a certain amount to what is inside the suitcase, and it is up to Mo to approve it, provided that the contestant can answer a rather easy trivia question. A question has a corresponding money prize. The money prize can be sponsored by a client.

=== Banker on the street ===
A man-on-the-street video recording is shown, offering the contestant prizes ranging from cash to simple funny things like a comb or a piggy bank.

== See also ==
- List of programs broadcast by Studio 23
- Kapamilya, Deal or No Deal
