= KC Montero =

American radio DJ and actor (born 1978)

- Born: Casey Wyatt Miller (Note: KC Montero is a United States citizen. Thus, he does not possess his mother's maiden name (Garabato) as is the convention in the Philippines.); June 17, 1978 (age 48); Tacoma, Washington, U.S.
- Occupations: Radio DJ; actor
- Years active: 1997–present
- Spouses: Geneva Cruz (m. 2004; div. 2012) Stephanie Dods (m. 2019)
- Children: 1
- Relatives: Troy Montero (brother); Colby Miller (brother)
- Website: kcmontero.com

Casey Wyatt Miller (born June 17, 1978), known professionally as KC Montero, is a Filipino-American radio DJ and actor currently based in the Philippines. He is currently the Vice President of Marketing and Head of Content at Kumu.

== Personal life ==
KC Montero was born as Casey Wyatt Miller on June 17, 1978. He is the brother of Troy Montero and Colby Miller. He was born to an American father of German and Irish descent and an American-born Filipino mother. He started his career as an MTV VJ in 1999 after winning the MTV VJ Hunt along with Belinda Panelo.

He was a former host on GMA 7's Sunday variety show SOP (Sobrang Okey Pare) and was seen on Party Pilipinas, Studio 23's Usi. He co-produced and hosted the MTV Pilipinas Video Music Awards 2006 and is a radio personality on the early morning show called "The KC Show" on Wave 891.

He was married to singer-actress Geneva Cruz but now are separated.

He tied the knot with Stephanie Dods on September 9, 2019 and named their baby Wyatt, in 2020.

On June 28, 2020, he was arrested for allegedly violating social distancing guidelines for COVID-19 prevention in a Makati bar.

== Filmography ==
=== Film ===
- Ano Bang Meron Ka?! (2001)
- Pakisabi na Lang ay Mahal Ko Siya (2002)
- Kubot: The Aswang Chronicles 2 (2014)
- Maria (2019)

=== Television ===
MTV Philippines shows

- MTV News
- MTV Jams
- MTV Diyes
- Be Seen @ MTV
- MTV Lokal
- MTV Alternative Nation
- MTV Loveline
- World Chart Express
- Pop Inc
- MTV Most Wanted

MTV Specials

- MTV Staying Alive Music Summit for HIV/ AIDS 2006
- MTV Pilipinas Video Music Awards 2006
- MTV's Top 25 Moments
- MTV Staying Alive Music Summit for HIV/ AIDS 2005
- MTV's Top 20 Live Performances of 2005
- MTV Pilipinas Video Music Awards 2005
- MTV Regional VJ Hunt 2005 in Bali, Indonesia
- MTV VJ Hunt 2005
- MTV Asia Aid Red Carpet Special
- MTV Style Awards
- Hula Hoop: MTV Pilipinas 2004 Pre-Show
- MTV Asia Awards Red Carpet Special 2004
- MTV Music Summit 2003
- MTV VJ Hunt 2003
- MTV Asia Awards Red Carpet Special 2003
- MTV Asia Awards Red Carpet Special 2002
- MTV Asia Awards Red Carpet Special 2001

Television

- SOP (Sobrang Okey Pare)
- Eat Bulaga! - Guest
- ASAP (ABS-CBN 2, 2001–2015)
- Usi (ABC 5, 2000)
- Match TV
- Beh! Bote Nga!
- Walang Tulugan with the Master Showman (1997–2016) - Guest
- It's Showtime (2009–present) - Guest/Celerity Jurado
- Party Pilipinas
- Tech Trip
- Survivor Philippines: Celebrity Doubles Showdown
- The G.O.A.T.
- Sunday All Stars
- Kapamilya, Deal or No Deal
- The Ryzza Mae Show - Guest
- Sunday PinaSaya - Guest
- Tonight with Arnold Clavio - Guest
- Alyas Robin Hood (Rigor Morales) [2017]
- Tonight with Boy Abunda - Guest
- Studio 7 (2018–present) - Guest
- Tadhana - Guest
- Dear Uge - Guest
- Mars Pa More (formerly Mars (GMA News TV 27, 2012–2019; GMA 7, 2019) - Guest
- Magandang Buhay - Guest
- FPJ's Ang Probinsyano (Lance Mendez) - Guest [2019]
- Lunch Out Loud (TV5, 2020) - Host
- FPJ's Batang Quiapo (Mr. Geronimo) - Guest [2024]
- The Master Cutter (Samir) - Guest [2026]

TV specials

- Miss World Philippines 2017
- Miss Universe Philippines 2020

=== Radio ===
- The KC Show (U92, 2009–2010; Wave 891, 2010–2012)
- The Wildside (Wave 89.1, 2015–2016)
- Good Times (Magic 89.9, 2018–2021)

== Discography ==
=== As featured artist ===
- "For the Love of You" (with Gabby Eigenmann) (from R2K)
