= Let This Feeling =

Single by Simone Angel
- B-side: "Remix"
- Released: 1993
- Genre: Eurodance
- Length: 3:59
- Label: A&M Records
- Songwriters: Pete Hammond; Simone Angel
- Producer: Cappella

Simone Angel singles chronology
| "When Love Rules the World" (1991) | "Let This Feeling" (1993) | "Walk on Water" (1994) |

Music video
- "Let This Feeling" on YouTube

"Let This Feeling" is a song by Dutch TV host, singer and MTV VJ Simone Angel, who also co-wrote it with Pete Hammond. Produced by Italian Eurodance act Cappella, it was released in 1993 by A&M Records and became a European hit; a top-10 hit in Finland and Israel, and a top-20 hit in Austria, Lithuania and Switzerland. The accompanying music video was directed by Matthew Glamorre.

== Chart performance ==
"Let This Feeling" charted in many European countries, becoming a top-3 hit in Finland as well as a top-20 hit in Austria (17), Lithuania (11), and Switzerland (15). In Germany, it reached number 38, spending eight weeks within the German Singles Chart. In the UK, the single only reached number 60 on the UK Singles Chart, with one week within the chart. But it became a club hit, peaking at numbers 33 and 20 on the Music Week Dance Singles chart and the Record Mirror Club Chart. "Let This Feeling" debuted on the Eurochart Hot 100 at number 78 on 11 December 1993, after charting in Denmark, Finland and Sweden. It peaked at number 51 in January 1994. Outside Europe, the song was successful in Israel, becoming a top-10 hit (8).

== Music video ==
The music video for "Let This Feeling" was directed by Scottish director Matthew Glamorre and produced by Angie Daniel for Momentum Video. It was released on 4 October 1993 and features Simone Angel performing in a shimmering crystal maze of mirrors in a silver flashing kaleidoscope thing and flying on a pegasus sculpture. The sculpture was made by English sculptor, performance artist, jewellery-maker, and portraitist Andrew Logan. MTV Europe put "Let This Feeling" on "break out" rotation in February 1994.

== Track listing ==
- 7" single, Italy
1. "Let This Feeling" (Crystal Clear Remix) – 5:38
2. "Let This Feeling" (Clean Remix) – 6:00
3. "Let This Feeling" (Mix 3)
4. "Let This Feeling" (Mix 4)
5. "Let This Feeling" (X Club Cut) – 5:40
6. "Let This Feeling" (XX Dub Cut) – 5:00
7. "Let This Feeling" (Mix 7)
- CD single, Europe
1. "Let This Feeling" (Radio Mix) – 3:59
2. "Let This Feeling" (Trance Mix) – 6:07
- CD maxi, Europe
1. "Let This Feeling" (Radio Mix) – 3:59
2. "Let This Feeling" (Crystal Clear Mix) – 5:38
3. "Let This Feeling" (X Club Cut) – 5:40
4. "When Love Rules the World" (Radio Mix) – 3:49

== Charts ==
| Chart (1993) | Peak position |
|---|---|
| Austria (Ö3 Austria Top 40) | 17 |
| Europe (Eurochart Hot 100) | 51 |
| Finland (Suomen virallinen lista) | 3 |
| Germany (GfK) | 38 |
| Israel (Israeli Singles Chart) | 8 |
| Lithuania (M-1) | 11 |
| Sweden (Sverigetopplistan) | 26 |
| Switzerland (Schweizer Hitparade) | 15 |
| UK Singles (Official Charts) | 60 |
| UK Dance (Music Week) | 33 |
| UK Club Chart (Music Week) | 20 |
