= Colby Miller =

Video jockey (born 1980)

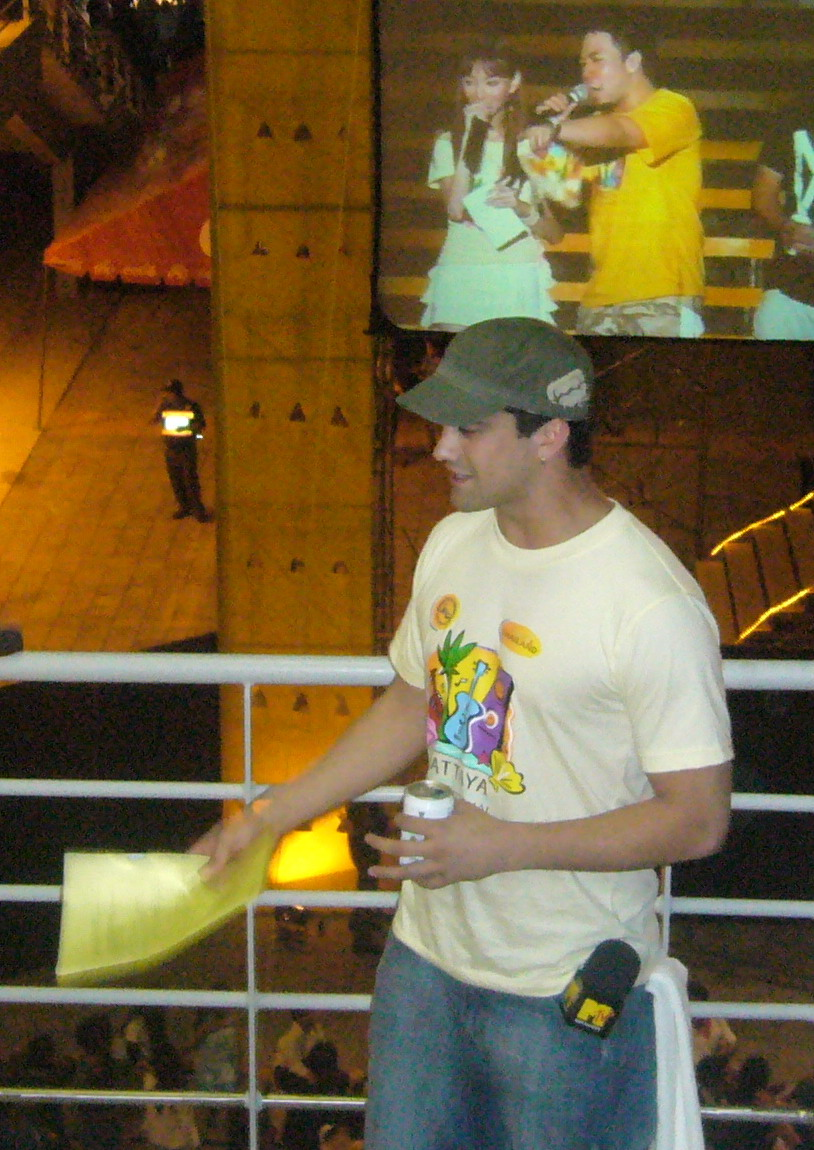
- Colby Miller at Pattaya Music Festival 2007, Thailand
- Born: Colby Miller; February 19, 1980 (age 45); Spanaway, Washington, U.S.
- Height: 5 ft 10 in (178 cm)
- Relatives: KC Montero (brother); Troy Montero (brother)

Colby Miller (born February 19, 1980) is an MTV VJ for MTV Asia. He began his career as an MTV VJ after winning the Philippine MTV VJ Hunt 2005.

== Biography ==
=== Early life ===
Miller was born in Spanaway, Washington. He graduated in 2004 from Central Washington University with a degree in Biology. He was born to an American father of German and Irish descent and a Filipino mother.

=== Career ===
Miller began his career as an MTV VJ after winning the Philippine MTV VJ Hunt 2005. He also won the first ever ASEAN MTV VJ Hunt held in Bali, Indonesia, where he competed against other winners of MTV VJ Hunts from around the region. Colby is currently based in Singapore where he hosts for MTV Asia in shows such as Pop Inc.

=== Personal life ===
Miller enjoys basketball, hiking, outdoor activities as well as visiting the gym. He is also the brother of Troy Montero and KC Montero.

== Television series ==
2004: MTV Supahstar: The Supahsearch
