= Topakk =

Philippine action-thriller film

- MMFF theatrical release poster
- Directed by: Richard V. Somes
- Written by: Jimmy Flores; Will Fredo; Richard V. Somes
- Produced by: Wilfredo C. Manalang; Michaelangelo Masangkay
- Starring: Arjo Atayde; Julia Montes; Sid Lucero; Enchong Dee; Kokoy de Santos
- Cinematography: Louie Quirino
- Edited by: Jamie Dumancas
- Music by: Jose Antonio Buencamino
- Production companies: Nathan Studios; Strawdogs Studio Production; FUSEE; Theo & Atlas Productions
- Distributed by: Raven Banner Entertainment
- Release dates: August 7, 2023 (Locarno); December 25, 2024 (Philippines)
- Running time: 113 minutes
- Country: Philippines
- Language: Filipino
- Budget: $650,000

Topakk, internationally known as Triggered, is a 2023 Philippine action thriller film directed by Richard Somes from a screenplay he co-wrote with Jimmy Flores and Will Fredo. It stars Arjo Atayde and Julia Montes. The film was first screened at the 78th Cannes Film Festival in May 2023 and premiered at the 76th Locarno Film Festival in Switzerland in August 2023. The film was theatrically released in the Philippines on December 25, 2024, as part of the 2024 Metro Manila Film Festival.

== Premise ==
An ex-special forces operative (Arjo Atayde) who suffers from post-traumatic stress disorder, attempts to save a woman (Julia Montes), whose life is being pursued by a corrupt police death squad working for a drug cartel.

== Cast and characters ==
- Arjo Atayde as Miguel Vergara
- Julia Montes as Weng Diwata
- Sid Lucero as Romero
- Enchong Dee as Leon Ramos
- Kokoy de Santos as Bogs Diwata
- Paolo Paraiso as Corpuz
- Vin Abrenica as Sarmiento
- Cholo Barretto as Aquinta
- Bernard Palanca as Zarcon
- Jeffrey Tam as Benjo
- Michael Roy Jornales as Elton
- Ivan Carapiet as Patilya
- Levy Ignacio as Col. Arturo
- Maureen Mauricio as Nanay Ruby
- Anne Feo as Mayor Armida 'Bakal' Dominguez
- Elora Españo as Jane Ramos
- Gerry Acao as Barako
- Victor Medina as Ramon
- Claire Ruiz as Gina Romero
- Julio De Leon as Diaz
- Manu Respall as Commander
- Bong Cabrera as Sct. Ranger Abelardo
- Rosh Barman as Sct. Guerrero
- Ivan Rivera as Sct. Ranger Dumagas
- Ian Lee as Bigote
- Geli Bulaong as Pinky
- Kayley Carrigan as Cora
- Yian Gabriel as Ben Tumbling
- Nico Dans as Administrator

== Production ==
Topakk was produced under Nathan Studios along with Fusee, Strawdogs Studio Production and Toronto-based post sound house Theo & Atlas Productions. According to multiple teasers and news sources released in 2020, the film was originally going to star JM de Guzman as Miguel and Annicka Dolonius in an unspecified role, but they were recast for unknown reasons. The film was directed by Strawdogs' Richard V. Somes.

Montes started her immersion training in preparation for Topakk as early as September 2022. Cornerstone Entertainment made the special announcement of the new film on their social media accounts.

The film was revised twice to achieve a more lenient rating of R-16 from the original R-18 rating from the Movie and Television Review and Classification Board for the Philippine-release.

== Release ==
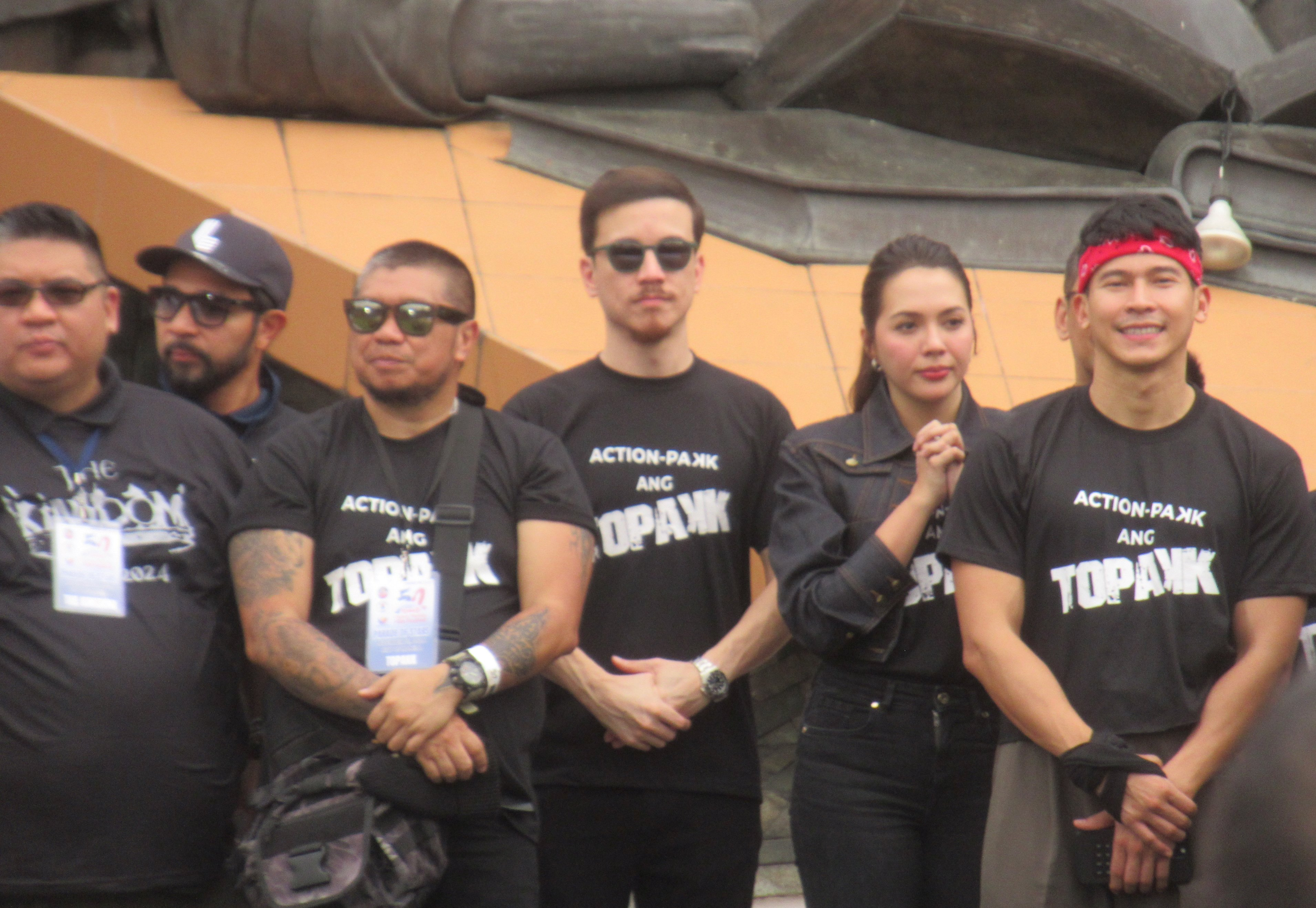
Topakk casts at the 50th MMFF Parade of Stars (right to left): Enchong Dee, Julia Montes, Arjo Atade and three film crews

Canada-based Raven Banner Entertainment became the global distributor of Topakk in 2022. Topakk went on sale at the European Film Market, which is an "annual trade fair held simultaneously with the Berlin International Film Festival or Berlinale for distributors, film buyers, producers, and financiers." Topakk was acknowledged at the Cannes’ Marché du Film for the first time in France, becoming the first Filipino film to qualify under the genre category of the fantastic pavilion of Cannes.

Following the film's gala screening at the Olympia Theater on May 19, Topakk has been sold to Lighthouse (German-speaking territories), Aud (South Korea), Superfine Films (India), Kinologistika (CIS and the Baltics). Topakk had its cinematic premiere at the Locarno Film Festival last August 9, 2023, in Switzerland. Topakk had its theatrical release in the Philippines on December 25, 2024, as part of the 2024 Metro Manila Film Festival. It is also scheduled to premier at Manila International Film Festival (MIFF) in Los Angeles on March 5, 2025.

=== List of film festivals competed or exhibited ===
- Locarno Film Festival, Switzerland
- FrightFest, United Kingdom
- Slash Fantastic Film Festival, Austria
- Sitges Film Festival, Spain
- Mayhem Film Festival, United Kingdom
- Fantastic Fest, United States
- Curtas Festival do Imaxinario, Spain
- Mumbai Film Festival, India
- Thessaloniki International Film Festival, Greece

== Reception ==
=== Critical response ===
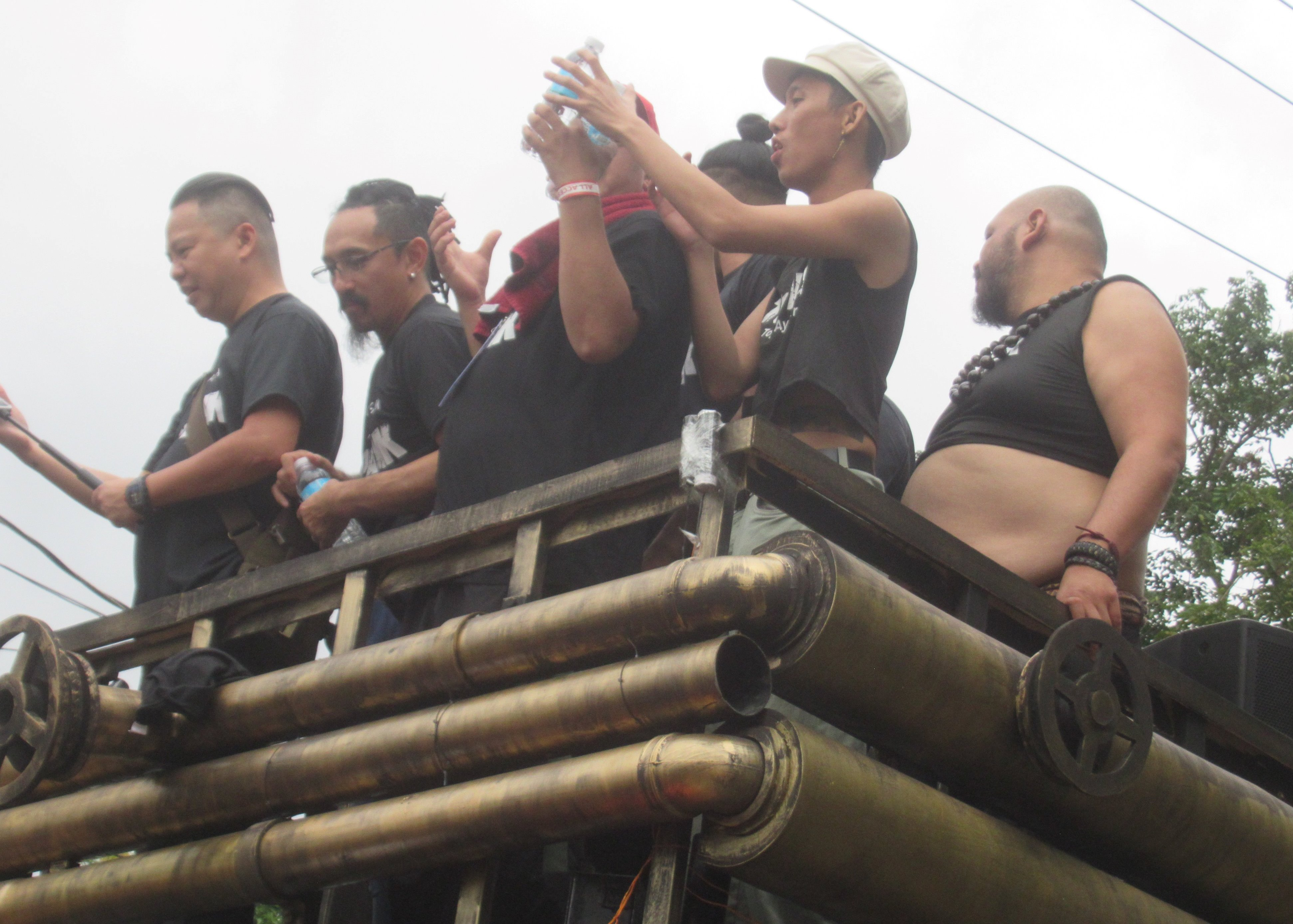
Topakk cast on MMFF Best Float

The Manila Times writer Tessa Mauricio Arriola opined that Topakk "effectively transcends the boundaries of conventional action films". Arriola also praised Atayde's "career-defining portrayal" and Montes' "force to be reckoned with" performance. BusinessWorld writer Joseph Garcia described the film as "one of the better action films to come out in recent memory", while Mark Angelo Ching of Philippine Entertainment Portal gave the film a positive review, calling it a "visual feast" and praised the performances of Atayde and Lucero with emphasis on Montes, stating that she delivered a "a standout acting performance". Writing for ABS-CBN News, Rhea Manila Santos described the film as a "one heartstopping action ride" and praised the performances of Atayde and Montes.

Kat Hughes of The Hollywood News gave the film three out of five stars, writing: "With such a strong focus on brutality and little space for light, the audience gets the sensation that they themselves have entered a war-zone... Somes’ dedication to the brave pushes his audience into the same head-space and this shared trauma highlights the savagery of war perfectly." ScreenAnarchy's Andrew Mack felt that the film is when "The Night Comes For Us meets Hardboiled", stating that "it may lack the kind of standout villains those other films had, but in way of the setting and the level of violence those films gave us, Triggered is pretty darned close to delivering something similar."

== Accolades ==
Accolades received by Topakk
Year	Award	Category	Recipient(s)	Result	Ref.
2024	Metro Manila Film Festival	Best Director	Richard Somes	Nominated	
2024	Metro Manila Film Festival	Best Actor	Arjo Atayde	Nominated	
2024	Metro Manila Film Festival	Best Actress	Julia Montes	Nominated	
2024	Metro Manila Film Festival	Best Supporting Actor	Sid Lucero	Nominated	
2024	Metro Manila Film Festival	Best Cinematography	Louie Quirino	Nominated	
2024	Metro Manila Film Festival	Best Production Design	Richard Somes	Nominated	
2024	Metro Manila Film Festival	Best Editing	Jamie Dumancas	Nominated	
2024	Metro Manila Film Festival	Best Sound	Jhon Eric Mancera	Nominated	
2024	Metro Manila Film Festival	Best Original Theme Song	"Darkness Calls"	Nominated	
2024	Metro Manila Film Festival	Best Musical Score	Jose Antonio Buencamino	Nominated	
2024	Metro Manila Film Festival	Fernando Poe Jr. Memorial Award for Excellence	Topakk	Won	
2024	Metro Manila Film Festival	Best Float	Topakk	Won	
2024	Metro Manila Film Festival	Special Jury Prize	Topakk	Won	
2025	The EDDYS	Best Actor	Arjo Atayde	Nominated	
2025	The EDDYS	Rising Producer Circle Award	Nathan Studios	Won	
2025	The EDDYS	Best Sound	Jhon Eric Mancera	Won	
2025	The EDDYS	Best Original Theme Song	"Topakk"	Nominated	
2025	The EDDYS	Best Visual Effects	Rhance Cariño	Nominated	
2025	FAMAS Awards	Best Picture	Topakk	Nominated	
2025	FAMAS Awards	Best Actress	Julia Montes	Nominated	
2025	FAMAS Awards	Best Actor	Arjo Atayde	Won	
2025	FAMAS Awards	Best Supporting Actor	Sid Lucero	Nominated	
2025	FAMAS Awards	Best Director	Richard Somes	Nominated	
2025	FAMAS Awards	Best Sound	Jhon Eric Mancera	Won	
2025	FAMAS Awards	Best Visual Effects	Rhance Cariño	Nominated	
2025	FAMAS Awards	Best Editing	Jamie Dumancas	Nominated	
2025	FAMAS Awards	Best Cinematography	Louie Quirino	Nominated	
2025	FAMAS Awards	Best Production Design	Richard Somes	Nominated	
2025	Star Awards for Movies	Movie of the Year	Nathan Studios, Strawdogs Studio Production, Fusee	Nominated	
2025	Star Awards for Movies	Movie Director of the Year	Richard V. Somes	Nominated	
2025	Star Awards for Movies	Movie Actor of the Year	Arjo Atayde	Nominated	
2025	Star Awards for Movies	Movie Ensemble Acting of the Year	—N/a	Nominated	
2025	Star Awards for Movies	Movie Screenwriter of the Year	Richard V. Somes, Jimmy Flores, Wil Fredo Manalang	Nominated	
2025	Star Awards for Movies	Movie Cinematographer of the Year	Louie Quirino	Nominated	
2025	Star Awards for Movies	Movie Editor of the Year	Jaime Dumancas	Nominated	
2025	Star Awards for Movies	Movie Production Designer of the Year	Richard V. Somes	Nominated	
2025	Star Awards for Movies	Movie Sound Engineer of the Year	Albert Michael Idioma, Andrea Teresa Idioma	Won	
2025	Star Awards for Movies	Movie Theme Song of the Year	"Darkness Calls" by Basti Artadi	Nominated	
2025	Gawad Tanglaw Awards	Best Supporting Actor	Sid Lucero	Won	
