= Panelo =

Panelo is a surname. Notable people with the name include:

- Belinda Panelo (born 1974), Filipino-American actress and model
- Salvador Panelo (born 1946), Filipino lawyer and former presidential spokesperson
