= Dave Holmes (television personality) =

American actor

- Born: David Robert Holmes; March 14, 1971 (age 55); St. Louis, Missouri, U.S.
- Education: College of the Holy Cross (BA)
- Occupations: TV personality, blogger, writer, actor
- Years active: 1996–present
- Partner: Ben Wise

David Robert Holmes (born March 14, 1971) is an American television host, writer, podcaster, producer, actor, and former VJ who was the runner-up on MTV's first Wanna Be a VJ contest in 1998.

== Early life ==
Holmes was born in New Jersey and raised in St. Louis. Holmes attended Villa Duchesne and Oak Hill School, the Saint Louis Priory School and the College of the Holy Cross in Worcester, Massachusetts, where he worked at WCHC, the campus radio station, and interned at WCCA-TV, Worcester's public access television station.

== Career ==
Despite his loss to Jesse Camp, MTV hired Holmes as a VJ shortly after Wanna Be a VJ. He went on to host several MTV shows, including 120 Minutes, Video Clichés, a Real World reunion special, and Say What? Karaoke until 2001. He was a co-host and substitute host on Total Request Live.

After leaving MTV in 2002, Holmes hosted FX's weekly movie night DVD on TV for 10 seasons, and Court TV's Saturday Night Solution for six. He hosted CBS's reality comedy series Fire Me Please in 2005. On July 7, 2007, he co-hosted Bravo's coverage of the Live Earth concerts with Karen Duffy. Holmes had a recurring role as "Leslie Frost" on Comedy Central's Reno 911!

Holmes came out as a gay man in Out magazine in 2002. On September 23, 2010, Holmes contributed a video to the "It Gets Better" project, spearheaded by advice columnist and gay rights activist Dan Savage.

He has been an editor-at-large for Esquire since 2015. Currently, he is the host of the LGBTQ-themed World of Wonder (formerly Earwolf) podcast Homophilia, which Entertainment Weekly called "thoughtful and charming." He hosts the Maximum Fun comedy quiz show Troubled Waters (formerly International Waters), and, with musician Mike Doughty, the Real World–themed Feral Audio podcast Truu Stowray. He appeared in a series of commercials for Ford Motor Company.

Since 2003, Holmes has co-hosted the live comedy game show The Friday Forty with The Walking Dead executive producer Scott M. Gimple. He is an on-air personality on the SiriusXM music channel The Spectrum.

On June 28, 2016, Penguin Random House's Crown Archetype imprint published Holmes' nonfiction book Party of One: A Memoir in 21 Songs. The memoir chronicles Holmes's experiences coming to self-acceptance during adolescence and early adulthood, with popular music as a guide and backdrop, from the 1980s through the present day. Kirkus Reviews has described it as "a hilarious and touching coming-of-age story that will strike a particular nerve among Generation Y."

== Personal life ==
Holmes has been in a long-term relationship with musician Ben Wise since the early 2000s.

== Filmography ==
=== Film ===
- Pillowfighter (2002, as Blindfolded Man)
- Fantastic Four (2005, as Reporter)
- You Owe Us. (2006, as Billy)
- Reno 911!: Miami (2007, as Persnickety Desk Worker)
- Promotion (2008)
- Atomic Zoo: Sylvia Plath Car Wash (2010, as Cake Boy)
- Hell Baby (2013, as Rental Car Guy)
- Contracted (2013, as Therapist)
- You or a Loved One (2014)
- Framing Britney Spears - The New York Times Presents S01E06 (2021, as self)

=== Television ===
- Total Request Live
- Say What? Karaoke
- Spankin' New Music Week (2000)
- Kidnapped (2000, as Host)
- Fire Me... Please (2005, as Host, 3 episodes)
- Reno 911! (2004–2009, as Leslie Frost)
- Self Storage (2010–2011, as Chad)
- Kroll Show (2013, as Day Foams)
- Ben and Kate (2013, as Casting Director)
- FX Movie Download (2013, as Host)
