= Troy Montero =

Filipino-American actor

- Born: Cody Andrew Miller; July 30, 1971 (age 55); Tacoma, Washington, U.S.
- Citizenship: American, Filipino
- Occupation: Actor
- Years active: 1995–present
- Spouse: Aubrey Miles (m. 2022)
- Children: 2
- Relatives: KC Montero (brother); Colby Miller (brother)

Cody Andrew Miller III (Note: Troy Montero is a United States citizen. Thus, he does not possess his mother's maiden name (Garabato) as is the convention in the Philippines.) (born July 30, 1971), known professionally as Troy Montero, is a Filipino-American actor.

He was born to an American father of German and Irish ancestry, and a U.S.-born Filipino mother. In 2008, he and then-girlfriend Aubrey Miles had a baby boy named Hunter at St. Luke's Medical Center Quezon City and on December 14, 2018 they had a daughter named Rocket Miller.

Montero is the brother of KC Montero and Colby Miller.

== Filmography ==
=== Film ===
- Empleyada (1998) (TV)
- Delivered (1998)
- Bakit Pa? (1999) Bryan
- Dito Sa Puso Ko (1999) Rams
- Eto Na Naman Ako (2000) Vince Madrigal
- Super B (2002) Edgar
- Binibining K (2006) Will
- El Presidente (2012) Frederick Funston

=== Television ===
- Keep on Dancing (1998–2000)
- Dear Mikee (2000) guest
- Sa Dulo ng Walang Hanggan (2001) Hector Soriano
- Auto Extreme (2005) guest
- Front Act (2008) guest
- Showtime (2010) guest judge
- Dog TV (2010) guest
- Talentadong Pinoy (2010) guest judge
- Kailangan Ko'y Ikaw (2013) Aldrich
- Wagas (2016) Dr. Rob
- Karelasyon (2016)
- A1 Ko Sa 'Yo (2016) Ken
- A Love to Last (2017) Michael
- Wattpad Presents: Captivated by Tyrone Greene (2017) Sebastian Greene
- Lilet Matias: Attorney-at-Law (2024) Spanky Macaraig
