= Jesse Camp =

American musician (b. 1980)

- Born: Josiah Jesse Camp; November 4, 1979 (age 46); Granby, Connecticut, U.S.
- Occupations: Television personality, musician, songwriter, filmmaker
- Years active: 1998–present

Josiah Jesse Holden Camp IV is an American musician and television personality who was the winner of the first Wanna Be a VJ contest on MTV.

== Career ==
Camp entered MTV's first Wanna Be a VJ contest in 1998. Portraying himself as homeless and projecting the image of a "street kid", controversy arose when it was discovered that he had been raised and attended private school in Connecticut. Additionally, The Village Voice reported that an internet source, known only by the handle "UglyPig", claimed to have cast over 3,000 votes for Camp in the Wanna Be a VJ contest, exploiting a security flaw in the system.

Camp beat fellow contestant Dave Holmes for a VJ job on MTV Live. Holmes was also later hired by MTV.

Camp was popular on the channel, with Rolling Stone saying: "An unlikely instant star, he was soon adored by preteen fans, who crowded around him devotedly as he paraded through Times Square in feather boas, leather trousers, sparkly Steven Tyler scarves, and mismatched leg-warmers during his wacky man-on-the-street segments for MTV."

Camp held his position on TRL with Carson Daly as the main host for over a year. Camp also hosted two additional programs of his own for daytime MTV audiences. Camp convinced MTV executives to let him book acts such as Faster Pussycat, Ratt, Sebastian Bach and Dee Snider as guests on his summer series "Lunch with Jesse" at a time when these artists were years past being in rotation on the channel. For over a year, Camp hosted the contemporary rock program MTV Rocks Off interviewing artists such as Joey Ramone, Henry Rollins, Korn, Limp Bizkit, Sugar Ray, Garbage, Peter Steele, Silverchair and Metallica.

Following his departure from TRL, Camp parlayed his MTV fame into a rock career with his 1999 debut album Jesse & the 8th Street Kidz on the Hollywood Records label. The album was produced by Rob Cavallo (Green Day, Kid Rock) and Julian Raymond (Cheap Trick, Glen Campbell), and specialized in the 1980s-style glam metal that fell out of fashion almost a decade before the album's release. Guest stars on the album included Stevie Nicks duetting with Camp on ballad "My Little Saviour", Rick Nielsen, Steve Hunter and Gregg Bissonette. Camp cowrote the album with Alex Kane (Life, Sex and Death, Antiproduct), Bam Bam and Jo Almeida (Dogs D'Amour) and Share Pedersen (Vixen, Bubble). The album sold 2,600 copies in its opening week.

A video for the first single "See You Around" included cameos from Reverend Run and Marky Ramone. Critical reviews were mixed. Rob Sheffield gave the album a review (3.5 stars) in Rolling Stone, while Stephen Thomas Erlewine of Allmusic gave the album 1 star out of a possible 5, writing: "At times, the music is catchy, but most of the time it's simply irritating, since Camp's singing is every bit as grating as his persona." In a retrospective review for The A.V. Club, Nathan Rabin noted that the album was well-produced and featured solid performances by the session musicians, but that the choice to obscure Camp's vocals on most songs betrays his limited musical ability, particularly on the duet with the far more talented Stevie Nicks.

Camp appeared in an impromptu cameo on the documentary titled Power & Control LSD in The Sixties, by Aron Ranen.

Camp starred in the 2019 music video for SAVAGES by metalcore band Ice Nine Kills playing Jesse Casey, station manager of fictional radio station Kill FM.

== Personal life ==
Camp was born in Granby, Connecticut. His father was a college professor and his mother was an elementary school principal. Camp attended public school in Granby through the eighth grade. For high school, Camp received a scholarship to Loomis Chaffee, a New England boarding school, graduating in 1997. Also in 1997, Camp received a scholarship to the drama department of UCLA but never attended.

On July 19, 2018, Camp was reported missing by his sister Marish to the Riverside Police Department. She stated that he had been out of contact with his family for about a week, which was unusual behavior for him, and that he was seen in Riverside around "the 11th or 12th of July". He was later seen in Fontana on July 19, when a bike patrol officer made a "pedestrian check" on Camp outside of a Sherwin-Williams store, just hours before his sister reported him missing.

On July 24, 2018, the Riverside Police Department confirmed that Camp was found safe.
