= Fire Me...Please =

2005 American reality television series

- Genre: Reality
- Presented by: Dave Holmes
- Country of origin: United States
- Original language: English
- No. of seasons: 1

Production
- Camera setup: Hidden camera
- Running time: 60 minutes
- Production company: LMNO Productions

Original release
- Network: CBS
- Release: June 7 – July 5, 2005

Fire Me...Please is an hour-long hidden camera reality series which aired on CBS in summer 2005. It was based on a BBC series called The Sack Race. Two contestants each reported to a new job at separate locations and figure out how to get fired as close to 3:00 p.m. as possible (the store owners are in on the gag, but the managers are not). When both contestants are fired, they report back to host Dave Holmes, and whoever was fired at the right time wins $25,000.

Fire Me...Please was believed to be the first reality show to employ a laugh track. The show was also believed to be the first reality series to have one half of an episode feature a repeat, and the other half feature new material. Although critics were not overwhelmed, the series did fairly well in the 18- to 49-year-olds demographic, often placing second against the popular drama House. The show was announced as one of the debut selections on CBS's Innertube website in May 2006, but never appeared on the website.

The show's on-air title was Fire Me Please! but CBS insisted the official title was Fire Me...Please.

The show is a close adaptation of a short-lived British format, The Sack Race, devised by Hugh Rycroft and first broadcast on BBC Three in 2003, with a repeat run on BBC Two in 2004. (Although the show is often considered to parody the popular series The Apprentice, The Sack Race in fact debuted some months earlier.) The main difference between the two versions is that the British version was played entirely for laughs, with all of the contestants being young stand-up comedians (including an early appearance by Laura Solon), and no significant prize money at stake - the prize being merely the average daily wage for the job they took on. While The Sack Race was promoted purely as a comedy programme, Fire Me...Please was advertised as a reality television show.
