= Good Times with Mo =

Morning radio show on Magic 89.9

Good Times With Mo
- Other names: Good Times; Good Times with Mo Twister; First Thing in the Morning; The Morning Show
- Genre: Talk, Pop, Adult hits, Top 40 (CHR)
- Running time: 180 minutes
- Country of origin: Philippines
- Languages: English, Filipino
- Home station: Magic 89.9 (2005-present)
- Syndicates: Magic Nationwide (2005-2014)
- TV adaptations: Studio 23
- Starring: Mo Twister (2005–present); Sam Oh (2013–18, 2024–present); Karylle (2024–present); Alex Calleja (2024–present); Bam Aquino (2024–present); Mara Aquino (2024–present)
- Created by: Mo Twister
- Recording studio: Mandaluyong, Philippines
- Remote studios: Las Vegas, Nevada (Mo Twister)
- Original release: October 2005
- No. of series: 2
- No. of episodes: 500+
- Audio format: Adult hits, Top 40 (CHR), Talk
- Website: magic899.com
- Podcast: Radio edition: open.spotify.com/show/5W15zRekHRHI4onZ3Lh3pt; Podcast edition: open.spotify.com/show/5ZKHbyeo97VivPN05bXt8r

Good Times with Mo (also known as Good Times or GTWM) is a morning radio show broadcast by Magic 89.9 and previously on the Killerbee network around the Philippines, hosted by Mo Twister and Sam Oh with Bam Aquino, Karylle, Alex Calleja and Mara Aquino every Monday to Thursday from 6 a.m. PST to 9 a.m. PST on Magic 89.9.

In addition to the radio program, Mo Twister created a separate, podcast version of his program under the title Good Times with Mo: The Podcast and is now currently on its 13th season.

== History ==
The show has been on the air since 2005 when Mo returned from Los Angeles and was given the late night slot. He returned in February 2006 with Mojo Jojo as his co-host. Andi9 came to the picture in late March 2006 as the replacement for Happy.

The show nearly collapsed in January 2007, when Andi left for the beach on New Year's Day in 2007. Mo originally proposed a 2-week suspension for her but later allowed her to invite a guest in Forbidden Questions. That guest was Andi's crush, Luis Alandy. Also, the iPod Luis' Christmas gift to Andi was to be auctioned to the highest bidder the Thursday after Forbidden Questions. He eventually went all the way to 40, thus saving Andi's job on Good Times With Mo, and her iPod nano. Despite this, Andi left the show the month after and Maui Taylor replaced her.

However, after an on-air dispute between Mo Twister and Maui Taylor, Maui Taylor resigned from the show on May 30, 2008. Andi9 once again became her replacement but for only a few months as she would eventually retire from the show once more in November 2008. Mo and Andi9 allegedly had a relationship and Andi's parents was against Mr. Gumatay. Grace Lee was then assigned as their third female co-host.

Since June 5, 2006, Good Times with Mo was placed in the morning slot and is one of the Top 5 morning shows in Philippine Radio (both in FM and AM).

Since January 22, 2012, Angelika left the show due to conflicts with co-host Grace Lee. In February 2012, Mojo resigned from Good Times for health reasons though he is still part of the radio. Suzy was introduced to the show.

On March 6, 2012, it was announced that Grace Lee had resigned from the show. She was replaced by Mia Bayuga.

On November 5, 2012, Makoy Pare ("Showbiz Bro"), a regular caller of the show, was given his own segment and was introduced to the show. In his segment, Makoy Pare ("Showbiz Bro") is called by the hosts to provide "local showbiz news". He is the longest running co-host of the show.

In 2013, the show was under a five-month suspension and was replaced by First Thing in the Morning, hosted by Sam Oh and Gibb. Mo returned when the show was revived on December 2, 2013, with Sam and Gibb as co-hosts.

In January 2014, Mikey Bustos replaced Gibb, but Bustos himself also ended up leaving a year after; after an off-air disagreement with his co-host Mo Twister. The show was temporarily a two-person army with Mo and Sam for many months (while also having guest co-hosts in Guji Lorenzana and Mara Aquino) before Bustos was officially replaced by Nikko Ramos in late November 2015.

In mid-2016, Senator Bam Aquino guested on Good Times with Mo. A few weeks later, he officially became a regular guest co-host once every week on the show until March 7, 2017.

In March 2018, DJ Sam Oh announced that she would be taking an indefinite leave from the show to do the Camino de Santiago. After she left in April, the show had numerous people sit-ins as they searched for a new co-host in the event that Sam Oh would not return. On August 13, 2018, it was announced that KC Montero would be the new co-host.

Later towards the end of 2018, Nikko Ramos left the show, unannounced. Since then, Hannah Bacani filled-in for his place until in January 2019, when she became the permanent co-host of the show replacing Ramos.

In October 2019, CJ Rivera and Suzy replaced Bacani when the latter moved to a new show "Wake Up Manila" airing from 5:00 to 7:00 a.m., while the former's show (Sunny Side Up) merged with Good Times thus reverting the show to a 3-hour program from a two-hour show which was done during Magic 89.9's reorganization of programming earlier that year.

Good Times returned on air after few months of hiatus. Mo Twister and Sam Oh also returned as hosts of the show. It aired again on February 14, 2024 (Valentine's Day). Later on March 5, Karylle Tatlonghari officially announced as the third co-host of the show. Alex Calleja and Mara Aquino were added in the show while Senator Bam Aquino is on once a week for an hour, where he discusses relevant political issues.

Sam Oh announced a hiatus from the show to focus on her Bible study training, with her last day on May 21, 2026. She returned to the program on August 10, 2026.

== Hosts ==
Current hosts

- Mo Twister (2005–present)
- Sam Oh (2013–18, 2024–present)
- Karylle (2024–present)
- Alex Calleja (2024–present)
- Bam Aquino (once a week, 2024–present)
- Mara Aquino (2024–present)

Former hosts

- Andi-9 (2006–07)
- Maui Taylor (2007–08)
- Grace Lee (2007–12)
- Mojo Jojo (2006–12)
- Angelica "Angelicopter" Schmeing (2010–12)
- Mia Bayuga (2012)
- Hannah Bacani (2018–19)
- Noelle Bonus (2013)
- Gibb (2013–14)
- Mikey Bustos (2014–15)
- Nikko Ramos (2015–18)
- CJ Rivera (2019–21)
- Makoy Pare ("Showbiz Bro") (2012–14/15)
- KC Montero (2018–21)
- Dora Dorado (2020–23)
- Tin "Suzy" Gamboa (2012–13, 2019-23)
- Ryan Racela (2022–24)

== Segments ==
=== Specials ===
- Guess The License Plate Number:
  - Chery QQ
  - Chevrolet Spark

=== Show Schedules ===
Former

- Bring Your Crush to Work Monday
- Alternative Tuesday
- Forbidden Questions Wednesdays
- Industry Secrets Thursday

Forbidden Questions was a controversial segment, with previous guests including:

- Tim Yap (October 2006; 39 out of 40)
- Lolit Solis (November 2006; 40 out of 40)
- John "Sweet" Lapus (December 13, 2006; 35 out of 40)
- Antoinette Taus (December 20, 2006; 15 out of 40)
- Rustom Padilla (January 3, 2007; 26 out of 40)
- Hero Angeles (January 10, 2007; 35 out of 40)
- Wilma Doesnt (January 31, 2007; 40 out of 40)
- Jaycee Parker (March 21, 2007; 27 out of 40)
- Mahal (July 18, 2007; 14 out of 40, current lowest scorer)
- Gary Lising (July 25, 2007; 40 out of 40)
- Rivermaya (September 19, 2007; 26 out of 40)
- Ellen Adarna (September 5, 2013; 40 out of 40)
- Bernard Palanca (November 21, 2013; 40 out of 40)
- Kat Alano versus Mo Twister (40 out of 40)
- Francine Prieto (January 23, 2014; 39 out of 40)
- Maria Ozawa (November 23, 2015; 40 out of 40)
- Maricar de Mesa (June 17, 2016; 39 out of 40)
- Baron Geisler (January 11, 2018; 9 out of 40)

=== Games ===
- Nonoy Name That Tune
- Where the Hell Are We Calling?
- Batman or President GMA
- Categories Game
- Celebrity Trivia
- ATM Andi/Grace Lee
- Porn Star or Athlete (e.g. Tennis Star)
- The Ex-Games
- Who Knows Mojo Jojo
- Yabang Mo!
- Where in the World Are We Calling?
- Sukapella

The Yabang Mo! had several variants, such as the 'I Gotta Feeling' which was played last late November 2009, where the listeners were asked to do the game by rapping it out in the tune of the said The Black Eyed Peas song for one minute.

=== Other stuff ===
- Gay or Straight
- Miguel's Prank Call
- Kwentong Kadiri
- Chick Republic
- Radio Tinder

== Spinoff TV show ==
In February 2008, Good Times spun off into a weekly TV show on Studio 23 hosted by Mo Twister, Mojo Jojo, Grace Lee and Andi9. The show aired every Tuesday nights at 11:00 p.m.

== Controversies ==
=== "Charice" Twitter hashtag joke ===
On May 9, 2012, the Good Times hosts started a butt-joke on Twitter while their show was on-air. It became the trending topic in the Philippines on Twitter. Almost immediately, the hashtag spread, drawing both positive and negative reactions from the listeners. International singing sensation Charice fought back by directly sending messages to Mo Twister through Twitter.

But later after the show on the same day, the management of Magic 89.9 released an official statement, suspending Mo, Suzy and Mia for two weeks without pay as a consequence.
