= Belinda Panelo =

- Also known as: Boo-Joo
- Born: Belinda Panelo (Note: Belinda Panelo was born in the United States. Thus, she does not possess her mother's maiden name.); June 22, 1974 (age 51); Seattle, Washington, U.S.
- Occupations: Actress, spokesperson

Belinda Jay Panelo is a Filipino American actress and former commercial model who became an MTV VJ after winning the MTV VJ Hunt in 1999, along with K. C. Montero. She is the daughter of U.S. vet, Salvador Sauza Panelo (not to be confused with the Filipino lawyer with same name). She made her mark in MTV as one of the funniest and wackiest MTV VJs ever, especially in her regular shows Classic MTV and MTV Mush.

== Personal life ==
Belinda left MTV in 2003 and has since married her longtime boyfriend, tennis player Joseph Lizardo, whom she has a child with. The family relocated to New York, NY. In February 2019, she was the target of a racist rant.
