= Yoonj Kim =

American journalist

Yoonj Kim is an American journalist, television correspondent, and writer. She was a correspondent at MTV News and was a correspondent and producer at Playboy, where she hosted the documentary show Journalista. She was also a former on-air talent and producer for the TPL Disrupt documentary series on Participant Media's Pivot. She is the recipient of numerous awards, including the Los Angeles Press Club's Award for Best Investigative Series.

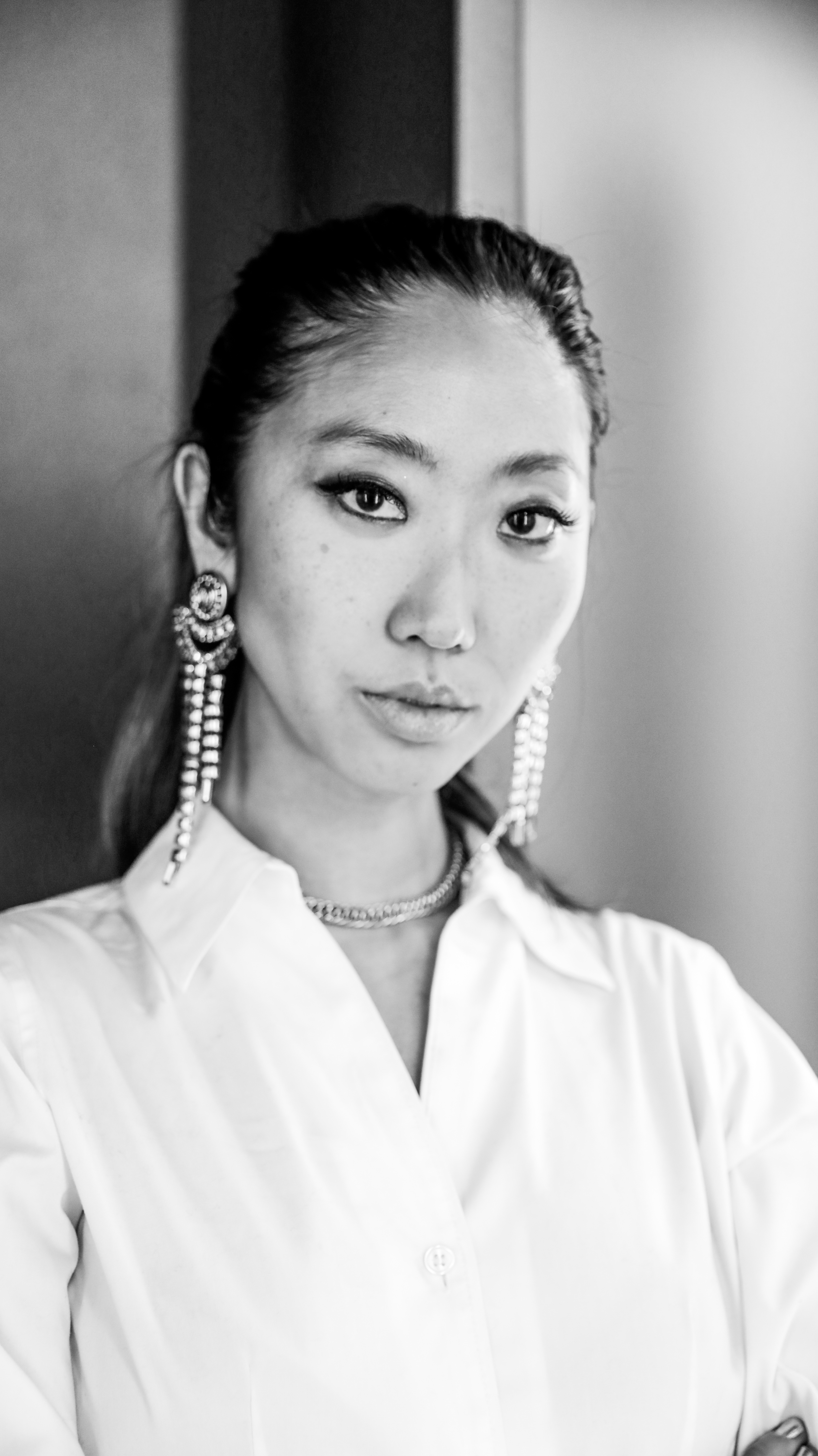
Kim in 2019

== Career ==
At Playboy, Kim was a founding talent and producer of its documentary and news video division. She covered stories on drug policy and subcultures for her show Journalista.

Previously she reported and produced for Vocativ and has appeared in its segments for msnbc. Topics covered include marijuana legislation and female incarceration. She hosted Participant Media's hour-long documentary special on the open defecation crisis in New Delhi, India. As a writer, Kim was a columnist for Bitch, writing on the intersection of race and the entertainment industry based on her personal experiences as a former model.

In 2021, she was a contributing writer in the anthology My Life: Growing Up Asian in America (Simon and Schuster).

Her commentary on politics and feminism have been published in The Guardian, The Los Angeles Times, and more, and she has frequently appeared as a commentator for CBS News, SiriusXM, and more.

In 2023, Kim starred in her own real estate-focused reality television series My Desert Shangri-La (2023) on Charter Communications about her home remodeling journey in Joshua Tree.

== Personal life ==
Kim got her start in the television industry when veteran television producer Mitch Koss read an article she wrote for Slate. Koss, who previously mentored Anderson Cooper and Lisa Ling, recruited her to develop and host documentary programming for television.
