= Momfluencer =

Slang for mothers seeking influence on social media

A mom influencer or momfluencer is a mother who shares the early moments of motherhood on social media, often utilizing sites such as Instagram. The term "dadfluencer" is less common, and refers to a father instead.

The term carries with it possible connotations of stress or obligation, felt by the new mother, in terms of the new mother feeling the need to take a high volume of pictures of a new child and share these pictures on such social media sites. Some momfluencers claim to use the new motherhood position in tandem with social media as a means to earn additional income, while others assert that "the influencer scene fully believes that nobody is actually making any money".

== History ==
The term first came into use in the early 2000s, along with the rise of social media and mobile phone technology which facilitated the ease of widespread sharing of personal baby photos from new mothers with a digital audience.

== Meaning and use ==
The term is a portmanteau of the words mom and influencer. A 'momfluencer' may refer to a new mother that may have "...social media followings in the tens of thousands or even millions..." where the new mother may share, "...tips and inspiration to their fellow moms..." about various duties of a new mother that might consist of installing a car seat or other such activities. Some mothers associated with minority racial or ethnic groups are reportedly paid less than their peers in majority racial or ethnic groups, in part, due to "limited financial transparency."

== Criticism ==
Some have criticized "mom influencer" culture for being overly focused on materialistic pursuits, or in building a form of rat race between competing parents to one-up others in terms of whom might be artificially deemed the best mother according to some external sources such as fans, followers, or the public generally. Author Sara Petersen in Time said:

Viewing beautifully shot and lit photos of a momfluencer's bespoke laundry room in her Nantucket mansion through the informed lens of entertainment can be fun and soothing. But we can't all afford Nantucket mansions, and the more we believe (or fool ourselves into believing) that aspirational wicker hampers can make our experiences of motherhood any less frustrating, exhausting, or confounding, the less mental space we have to focus on the broken systems and institutions making motherhood so hard for so many of us.

Petersen stated in an interview with Vox regarding a book on the subject from 2023 called Momfluenced that, "The momfluencer, obviously, is not a real person. She's a construct, created by real mothers in the mid-aughts, in concert with tech companies and consumer brands, as a way of making a living on social media." Petersen also criticized momfluencers, or "momfluencer culture", for being predominantly white, and upper middle class. She also criticizes the image put forth by some so called momfluencer women as airing a generally misleading lifestyle on social media in terms of affordability. An example includes renting an expensive car and taking pictures of the vehicle while on a holiday, and then pretending that the vehicle is not rented, but is owned. Petersen's book also was reviewed by Rolling Stone in 2023 wherein Petersen said that momfluencer culture included themes of, "race, class, capitalism, consumerism, domesticity, ideals for femininity. There was a lot there."

== See also ==
- Mommyblogs
