= Maria (2019 film) =

- Theatrical release poster
- Directed by: Pedring A. Lopez
- Written by: Yz Carbonell; Rex Lopez
- Story by: Pedring A. Lopez
- Produced by: Maia Yambao-Lopez; Rex Lopez; Vincent Del Rosario III; Veronique Del Rosario-Corpus; Valerie Del Rosario
- Starring: Cristine Reyes; Germaine De Leon; KC Montero
- Cinematography: Pao Orendain
- Edited by: Jason Cahapay
- Music by: Jessie Lasaten
- Production companies: Viva Films; BlackOps Studios Asia; Psyops8
- Distributed by: Viva Films (Philippines); Netflix (United States)
- Release date: March 27, 2019
- Running time: 90 minutes
- Country: Philippines
- Languages: Filipino; English

Maria is a 2019 Filipino action thriller film directed by Pedring Lopez and written by Pedring Lopez and Yz Carbonell. The plot revolves around Maria (Cristine Reyes), a former hired assassin who now lives a happy home life. But things are about to change when she is spotted by someone from her past.

The film was produced by Viva Films in partnership with streaming site Netflix. It was released in theaters nationwide on March 27, 2019.

== Premise ==
Maria (Cristine Reyes) is a former hired assassin who now lives a happy home life. But things turn for the worse when her former boyfriend and partner-in-crime, Kaleb (Ivan Padilla), finds her and tries to turn her over to her former self again.

== Plot ==
The movie starts off with Maria infiltrating a mansion and killing everyone inside. The very end of that shows a mother and her child crying and blacks out to the sound of a gunshot.

Fast forward to the present, Maria wakes up next to her Husband Bert, gives him a kiss, and goes to check on her daughter, Min-Min. Her husband comes in saying he's going to skip breakfast to go to a meeting with Governor Villanueva. She tells him that all politicians are the same and that he should be having breakfast instead.

Ricardo de la Vega watches a press conference of Governor Villanueva. A reporter asks him about his anti-drug campaign and his partner Ricardo. Governor denies any link with Ricardo and says that once he's elected they'll get justice. Ricardo yells at the TV that he put him in that position. Then he beats a traitor to death with a bat and two others are shot dead by his female agents. He tells Kaleb and Victor that Governor Villanueva is making too much noise and that he needs to be taken care of. He orders Kaleb to take care of it, which upsets Victor. He asks Ricardo why he allows Kaleb to mess things up and Ricardo responds: I call the shots.

Bert and Maria watch Governor Villanueva on TV with Min-Min sleeping in their lap. Bert tells her that he thinks the governor is really a good guy and Maria responds sarcastically that of course he is. When he gets upset, she tells him she's just joking.

At the rally for Villanueva, one of Ricardo's men is reporting about the situation of the security being tight. Maria goes to get Min-Min from talking to a police officer and the man takes a picture of her. He sends the pictures to Kaleb and he immediately recognizes Maria and heads over to the rally to find her, but she has already left.

Back at home, Bert is watching the governor on the TV again and Maria turns it off. They get into an argument about him paying more attention to the governor than to his own family.

At the docks, Victor and his men torture a man to get information. He calls Kaleb to ask how it's going and tells him he's going to send men over, but Kaleb snubs him. Ricardo walks in and asks if the man gave any name. Victor shoots the man in the head and tells him no.

Kaleb practices sparring with his trainer and has a flashback with his girlfriend Lily where she tells him that she doesn't want to kill anymore. He tells her that they have one more mission and that afterwards he would talk to Ricardo. In the present Kaleb knocks his trainer out and tells his bodyguards to clean up the mess.

Kaleb calls Victor's men together and tells Miru to take care of the governor while he takes care of something else. He tells the men that he sent them a picture of Maria's family and that he wants them to find them and bring them to him. Kaleb's men kidnap Leo and torture him into telling him where Maria lives.

Kaleb's men see Maria in a market place and chase her. But she overpowers them and then hurries home. She tells her husband Bert and Min-Min to pack. Meanwhile, the doorbell rings. Bert finds Leo at the door who gets shot by Kaleb who calls Maria 'Lily'. After a few seconds of pondering she puts the gun down. One of the men separates her and her daughter, and when she runs towards her father Kaleb shoots her in the face. Her father grabs her and starts crying and Kaleb puts a gun to his neck.

The film then flashes back to the scene at the beginning of the film. Lily had refused to kill the lady and her daughter and another man was about to do it, but she shot him in the head, shot Kaleb in the knee and ran off with the girl and her mother.

Back to the present she fights to get away from the men and her husband pushes away from Kaleb as well and fights him. Bert, seeing more men coming from the back entrance, shoves Kaleb away and gets shot while blocking Maria from their bullets. Maria kills all of the assassins but Kaleb who gets dragged out by a goon into a car, where it was revealed that he was wearing a bullet proof vest. He calls Ricardo who asks is it done and tells him that they have bigger problems because Lilly is alive and everyone else is dead. He then calls Miru and tells her to fall back. Maria cries with Min-Min in her arms then kisses her dead husband on the forehead, grabs her knives then gets on a train.

Maria approaches her mentor and old mafia syndicate member Sir Greg and asks for a place to stay. He tells her to go to a hotel as doesn't want anything to do with this. But finally he decides to help Maria.

Kaleb gives his girlfriend Miru a picture of Maria and tells her to finish her off. He tells her that she's at Old man Greg's place, but not to touch him because they have an agreement with him. Miru goes to Greg's place, knocks out his muscleman Bogart, goes on her way.

Meanwhile, Maria infiltrates a drug packing factory of Ricardo's and after taking out the guards and the chemists, and sets the building on fire.

Greg tells Maria that he hated being the one to have to put her down after Ricardo's gang put a bounty on her. During a flashback it is revealed that they were about to square down gun to gun, but he gave her pills to take to give her an easy death. He took her to Kaleb to go show him her body. Back in the present he tells her that she was the reason he retired, and to never think that no good could happen to her because as long as she was breathing, she had an opportunity to find happiness. She asks him for equipment. Victor goes to Kaleb and tells him he's taking over because the factory is in ashes. Kaleb pulls a gun on Victor and tells him, he's going to kill him. Victor takes the gun and puts it to his forehead and tells him to pull the trigger, but he can't do it. Kaleb screams at Victor I'm going to kill you as he walks out.

Maria is sitting in the restaurant watching footage of the burning factory and Sir Greg walks in and says you're famous. He tells her to follow him. He takes her to the back where all of his weapons are and tells her that she can take anything because no one is going to dare to come after him because of all the assassins he trained. She picks up a knife and tells him she's also going to need a dress. Maria walks into a nightclub wearing the new dress and locks eyes with Miru. She walks into the restroom and Miru follows shortly after and two of Kaleb's men block the entrance. They argue briefly over which one of them is better than begin to fight. The fight ends with Maria bashing Miru's head into the corner of the vanity then digging her heel into her skull, killing her. The men hear this and become concerned, rushing into the bathroom. Maria quickly disarms one of them and shoots them both. She walks out of the bathroom, encounters a few more men, easily dispatches them then heads upstairs. She sits down with the club manager on a couch and asks where Kaleb is. He gives her a phone where she can contact and him and as she walks away he says give my regards to your family. She put her knife to his throat, forced him to eat a handful of drugs, then threw all of the money inside of a duffel bag over to the people in the club.

Ricardo sits down with Victor and asks him to take out Governor Villanueva. When he asks about Lily, Ricardo says to let Kaleb take care of her. Victor starts to protest, but Ricardo slams his hand down on the desk and tells him he will never be head of this family and to work on the governor.

Back at the bar, Greg asks how it went last night with Maria, and he tells her that it's not too late for her and that he'll give her money to start over. Their talk is interrupted by a call from Kaleb telling her to meet him that night at the docks. Kaleb also calls Victor and tells him to go to the docks as well. He tells Wednesday to get everyone ready and that there are to be no survivors – not even Kaleb.

Wednesday shows up at the docks and Kaleb asks where Victor is. Maria shows up at the docks as well in tactical gear, takes out a guy to get his gun and stealthily makes her way around the docks. Wednesday hears the gunshots and tells her men to get into position to which Kaleb angrily says I make the decisions and I say stand down. Maria continues to take down his men. Wednesday challenges him and he finally lets her get into position. He asks what they're waiting for, and her men start firing on the office with Kaleb still inside, killing some of his bodyguards. Greg appears with a sniper rifle and starts to take down Victor's men as they pull up. Victor calls Greg and tries to tell him that he violated the deal, but Greg insists that because he didn't touch Victor the agreement is still intact and he's just trying to even the odds. Meanwhile, Wednesday tries to sneak up on Maria, but Maria kills her easily. She continues to approach the docks office while the remaining two of Kaleb's bodyguards cover him from Victor's men long enough for him to get away. Maria catches up to Kaleb, however, and the two spar while he taunts her. Maria eventually gets the upper hand and he tells her she can't escape death; she is death. She says 'I know.', right before she slits his throat.

Later on, Kaleb's body is on a slab with Victor and Ricardo standing over him. Ricardo tells Victor to avenge his brother.

Back at the bar, Greg gives Maria a bag full of cash and shares one last drink with her in silence. The movie ends with them sitting side by side locking eyes.

== Cast ==
- Cristine Reyes as Lily/Maria
- Germaine De Leon as Kaleb (as Ivan Padilla)
- KC Montero as Victor
- Ronnie Lazaro as Greg
- Freddie Webb as Ricardo De la Vega
- Guji Lorenzana as Bert
- Johanna Rish Tongcua as Min-Min
- Jennifer Lee as Miru
- Cindy Miranda as Wednesday
- Andrea Del Rosario as Felicia Santiago
- Miel Manalang as Vati
- Johnny Revilla as Governor Ramon Villanueva
- Ronnie Liang as Club Manager
- L.A. Santos as Leo
- Enzo De Guia as Leo's Friend

== Ratings ==
According to the Movie and Television Review and Classification Board (MTRCB), due to several bloody, violent scenes, and frequent use of foul language only audiences eighteen (18) years old and above can view this film. The MTRCB classified the film as rated R-18.
