= Mo Twister =

Radio personality

- Born: Mohan Gumatay (Note: Mo Twister was born in the United States. Thus, he does not possess his mother's maiden name.); October 19, 1977 (age 49); Queens, New York City, U.S.
- Occupations: Host, radio DJ, photographer
- Years active: 1996–2002; 2006–present
- Spouse: Angelika Schmeing (m. 2021; div. 2025)
- Partner(s): Bunny Paras; Janette McBride
- Children: 3
- Website: motwister.com

Mohan Gumatay (born October 19, 1977), known professionally as Mo Twister, is a Filipino American radio and television presenter. He is best known for his Good Times programs, which started as a radio show and later spun off to the television and Internet. He currently resides in Las Vegas and remotely hosts the Good Times with Mo (GTWM) radio show on Magic 89.9 in the Philippines, as well as his own GTWM podcast.

== Personal life ==
On June 16, 2021, Gumatay married his former GTWM co-host and fellow disk jockey Angelika "Angelicopter" Schmeing in Iceland. Both based in the United States, they have a daughter together, while sharing a son from Schmeing's previous marriage. Gumatay has a daughter with former partner and former actress Bunny Paras.

Gumatay was in an eight-year on-and-off relationship with Janette McBride, a Filipino-Australian former actress and television host, with their break up finalized in 2016.

In July 2024, Gumatay revealed his separation from his wife.

== Discography ==
=== TV shows ===
- Celebrity Talk present (Main Host) (TV5)
- Talk TV (ABS-CBN)
- SOP (GMA Network)
- ASAP (ABS-CBN) (1999–2003)
- Cyberkada (ABS-CBN)
- The Buzz (ABS-CBN)
- Sabado Live (ABS-CBN)
- Keep on Dancing (ABS-CBN)
- Y Speak (Studio 23)
- Showbiz Central (GMA Network) - co-host (2007–2010)
- Points of View (Studio 23)
- Kabarkada, Break the Bank (Studio 23)
- Last Woman Standing (Q)
- Good Times (Studio 23)
- iMO: In My Opinion (ANC)
- Paparazzi - co-host (TV5)
- Juicy - co-host (TV5)
- Willing Willie - co-host (TV5)
- The G.O.A.T. - co-host (Fox Sports Asia)

=== Radio shows ===
Year	Title	Station
1996–2002	Early Returns Countdown	Magic 89.9
2005–present	Good Times With Mo	Magic 89.9

=== Internet shows ===
Year	Title	Station	Note
2011; 2012–2015	Good Times With Mo: The Podcast	New Media Factory	Season 1-3, 165 episodes
2015–2017	Good Times With Mo: The Podcast	D5 Originals	Season 4, 116 episodes
2015–present	Full Court Report	Sports5	Season 1, 61 episodes
