= Video jockey =

Host on music television

A video jockey (abbreviated VJ or sometimes veejay) is an announcer or host who introduces music videos and live performances on commercial music television channels such as MTV and VH1.

== Origins ==
The term "video jockey" comes from the term "disc jockey", "DJ" ("deejay") as used in radio. Music Television (MTV) popularized the term in the 1980s (see List of MTV VJs). The MTV founders got their idea for their VJ host personalities from studying Merrill Aldighieri's club. Aldighieri worked in the New York City nightclub Hurrah, which was the first to make a video installation as a prominent featured component of the club's design with multiple monitors hanging over the bar and dance floor. When Hurrah invited Aldighieri to show her experimental film, she asked if she could develop a video to complement the DJ music so that then her film would become part of a club ambiance and not be seen as a break in the evening. The experiment led to a full-time job there.

Several months later the future MTV founders patronized the club, interviewed her, and took notes. She told them she was a VJ, the term she invented with a staff member to put on her first pay slip. Her video jockey memoirs list the live music she documented during her VJ breaks. Her method of performing as a VJ consisted of improvising live clips using a video camera, projected film loops, and switching between two U-matic video decks. She solicited the public to collaborate. The club showcased many video artists, who contributed raw and finished works. Her work also incorporated stock footage. Aldighieri next worked at Danceteria, which had a video lounge and dance floor separate levels.

Sound & Vision, however, credits the creation of the VJ to comedian and former DJ himself Rick Moranis, who would introduce music clips on television under his Gerry Todd persona on Second City Television. The sketches ran before MTV debuted in the United States. "There had been no such thing" up until that point, confirmed Moranis' SCTV castmate Martin Short, so "the joke was that there would be such a thing."

== See also ==
- Disc jockey
- Radio jockey
- VJing
- MTV Select
- Video production
- List of MTV VJs
