= 2022 South by Southwest Film Festival =

Edition of film festival

- Location: Austin, Texas, U.S.
- Festival date: March 11–20, 2022
- Website: www.sxsw.com
- 2023 2021

The 2022 South by Southwest Film Festival, also known as 2022 SXSW Film Festival took place from March 11 to 20 at several venues in Austin, Texas, as part of the larger South by Southwest annual event. It marks the first in-person festival since 2019 due to the COVID-19 pandemic. Science fiction film Everything Everywhere All at Once opened the festival. It became the first film to premiere at the festival and later win the Academy Award for Best Picture. The festival was closed with the premiere episode of the third season of Atlanta.

== Official selection ==
=== Headliners ===
Title	Director(s)	Production country
Apollo 10½: A Space Age Childhood	Richard Linklater	United States
Atlanta (Season 3) (closing night)	Hiro Murai	United States
Bodies Bodies Bodies	Halina Reijn	United States
Everything Everywhere All at Once (opening night)	Daniel Kwan, Daniel Scheinert	United States
The Lost City	Aaron and Adam Nee	United States
The Unbearable Weight of Massive Talent	Tom Gormican	United States

=== Narrative Feature Competition ===
Title	Director(s)	Production country
A Lot of Nothing	Mo McRae	United States
I Love My Dad	James Morosini	United States
It Is in Us All	Antonia Campbell-Hughes	Ireland
Linoleum	Colin West	United States
Nika	Vasilisa Kuzmina	Russia
Seriously Red	Gracie Otto	Australia
Slash/Back	Nyla Innuksuk	Canada
Soft & Quiet	Beth de Araújo	United States

=== Documentary Feature Competition ===
Title	Director(s)	Production country
Bad Axe	David Siev	United States
Clean	Lachlan McLeod	Australia
It's Quieter in the Twilight	Billy Miossi	United States
Mama Bears	Daresha Kyi	United States
Master of Light	Rosa Ruth Boesten	United States
The Pez Outlaw	Amy and Bryan Storkel	United States
Spaz	Scott Leberecht	United States
The Thief Collector	Allison Otto	United States

=== Narrative Spotlight ===
Title	Director(s)	Production country
Gone in the Night (Note: Gone in the Night was previously titled The Cow on its premiere.)	Eli Horowitz	United States
Lover, Beloved	Michael Tully	United States
Me Little Me	Elizabeth Ayiku	United States
Millie Lies Low	Michelle Savill	New Zealand
Pirates	Reggie Yates	United Kingdom
The Prank	Maureen Bharoocha	United States
Pretty Problems	Kestrin Pantera	United States
Spin Me Round	Jeff Baena	Italy, United States
Stay the Night	Renuka Jeyapalan	Canada
To Leslie	Michael Morris	United States

=== Documentary Spotlight ===
Title	Director(s)	Production country
Crows are White	Ahsen Nadeem	United States
Diamond Hands: The Legend of WallStreetBets	Drea Cooper, Zackary Canepari	United States
Facing Nolan	Bradley Jackson	United States
Gabby Giffords Won't Back Down	Julie Cohen, Betsy West	United States
The Kids in the Hall: Comedy Punks	Reginald Harkema	Canada
Mickey: The Story of a Mouse	Jeff Malmberg	United States
More Than Robots	Gillian Jacobs	United States
Nothing Lasts Forever	Jason Kohn	United States
Shouting Down Midnight	Gretchen Stoeltje	United States
Skate Dreams	Jessica Edwards	United States
Split at the Root	Linda Goldstein Knowlton	United States
Still Working 9 to 5	Camille Hardman, Gary Lane	United States
Tony Hawk: Until the Wheels Fall Off	Sam Jones	United States
Under the Influence	Casey Neistat	United States
We Are Not Ghouls	Chris James Thompson	United States
We Feed People	Ron Howard	United States
What We Leave Behind	Iliana Sosa	United States
A Woman on the Outside	Lisa Riordan Seville, Zara Katz	United States
Your Friend, Memphis	David Zucker	United States

=== Midnighters ===
Title	Director(s)	Production country
Bitch Ass	Bill Posley	United States
The Cellar	Brendan Muldowney	Ireland, Belgium
Deadstream	Vanessa and Joseph Winter	United States
Hypochondriac	Addison Heimann	United States
No Looking Back	Kirill Sokolov	Russia
Sissy	Hannah Barlow, Kane Senes	Australia
Watcher	Chloe Okuno	United States, United Arab Emirates
X	Ti West	United States

=== Festival Favorites ===
Title	Director(s)	Production country
2nd Chance	Ramin Bahrani	United States
32 Sounds	Sam Green	United States
Aftershock	Paula Eiselt, Tonya Lewis Lee	United States
The Art of Making It	Kelcey Edwards	United States
Boycott	Julia Bacha	United States
Cha Cha Real Smooth	Cooper Raiff	United States
Descendant	Margaret Brown	United States
Emergency	Carey Williams	United States
Fire of Love	Sara Dosa	United States
Marcel the Shell with Shoes On	Dean Fleischer Camp	United States
Master	Mariama Diallo	United States
TikTok, Boom.	Shalini Kantayya	United States

=== Visions ===
Title	Director(s)	Production country
The Blind Man Who Did Not Want to See Titanic	Teemu Nikki	Finland
Chee$e	Damian Marcano	Trinidad and Tobago, United States
Jethica	Pete Ohs	United States
Self-Portrait	Joële Walinga	Canada
Sell/Buy/Date	Sarah Jones	United States
Shadow	Bruce Gladwin	Australia
The Unknown Country	Morrisa Maltz	United States
A Vanishing Fog	Augusto Sandino	Colombia, Czech Republic, Norway

=== 24 Beats Per Second ===
Title	Director(s)	Production country
Anonymous Club	Danny Cohen	Australia
Cesária Évora	Ana Sofia Fonseca	Cabo Verde, Portugal
Dio: Dreamers Never Die	Don Argott, Demian Fenton	United States
Getting It Back: The Story Of Cymande	Tim Mackenzie-Smith	United Kingdom
I Get Knocked Down	Sophie Robinson, Dunstan Bruce	United Kingdom
In the Court of the Crimson King: King Crimson at 50	Toby Amies	United Kingdom
Jazz Fest: A New Orleans Story	Frank Marshall, Ryan Suffern	United States
Look At Me: XXXTentacion	Sabaah Folayan	United States
The Mojo Manifesto: The Life and Times of Mojo Nixon	Matt Eskey	United States
Omoiyari: A Song Film by Kishi Bashi	Kaoru Ishibashi, Justin Taylor Smith	United States
Really Good Rejects	Alice Gu	United States
The Return of Tanya Tucker: Featuring Brandi Carlile	Kathlyn Horan	United States
Santos - Skin to Skin	Kathryn Golden	United States
Sheryl	Amy Scott	United States
This Much I Know to Be True	Andrew Dominik	

=== Global ===
Title	Director(s)	Production country
The Locust	Faeze Azizkhani	Iran, Germany
Public Toilet Africa	Kofi Ofosu-Yeboah	Ghana
Raquel 1:1	Mariana Bastos	Brazil
Without Prescription	Juliana Maite	Puerto Rico
Women Do Cry	Vesela Kazakova, Mina Mileva	Bulgaria, France

=== Episodic Premieres ===
Title	Showrunner(s)	Production country	Network
61st Street	Peter Moffat, J. David Shanks	United States	AMC
The Big Conn	James Lee Hernandez, Brian Lazarte	United States	Apple TV+
Brené Brown: Atlas of the Heart	Meaghan Rady	United States	HBO Max
DMZ	Roberto Patino	United States	HBO Max
The Girl from Plainville	Liz Hannah, Patrick Macmanus	United States	Hulu
Halo	Steven Kane	United States	Paramount+
The Last Movie Stars	Ethan Hawke	United States	HBO Max
The Man Who Fell to Earth	Alex Kurtzman, Jenny Lumet, John Hlavin	United States	Showtime
Shining Girls	Silka Luisa	United States	Apple TV+
Swimming with Sharks	Kathleen Robertson	United States	The Roku Channel
They Call Me Magic	Rick Famuyiwa	United States	Apple TV+
WeCrashed	Drew Crevello, Lee Eisenberg	United States	Apple TV+

=== Episodic Pilot Competition ===
Title	Showrunner(s)	Production country
Awayy	Aqsa Altaf, John X. Carey	United States
Brownsville Bred	Elaine Del Valle	United States
Hidden Kingdom	Sunny Lee, Jacqueline Davis	United States
My Year of Dicks	Pamela Ribon	United States
Something Undone	Nicole Dorsey	Canada
We're Doing Good	Elvira Ibragimova	United States

== Awards ==
The following awards were presented at the festival:

=== Grand Jury ===
- Narrative Feature Competition Jury Award: I Love My Dad by James Morosini
  - Special Jury Recognition for Extraordinary Cinematic Vision: Cast and crew of It Is in Us All
  - Special Jury Recognition for Breakthrough Performance: Elizaveta Yankovskaya for Nika
- Documentary Feature Competition Jury Award: Master of Light by Rosa Ruth Boesten
  - Special Jury Recognition for Exceptional Intimacy in Storytelling: Bad Axe by David Siev
  - Special Jury Recognition for Acting in a Documentary: Steve Glew for The Pez Outlaw
- Narrative Short Competition Jury Award: All the Crows in the World by Tang Yi
  - Special Jury Recognition for Directing and Community Filmmaking: Glitter Ain't Gold by Christian Nolan Jones
  - Special Jury Recognition for Outstanding Performances: Aphrodite Armstrong and Kyle Riggs for West By God
- Documentary Short Competition Jury Award: Long Line of Ladies by Rayka Zehtabchi and Shaandiin Tome
  - Special Jury Recognition for Visual Reflection: not even for a moment do things stand still by Jamie Meltzer
- Midnight Shorts Jury Award: Moshari by Nuhash Humayun
  - Special Jury Recognition for Powerful "Short Trip": Omi by Kelly Fyffe-Marshall
- Animated Shorts Jury Award: Bestia by Hugo Covarrubias
  - Special Jury Recognition for Unexpected Emotion: Les Larmes de la Seine by Yanis Belaid and Eliott Benard
  - Special Jury Recognition for Visceral Storytelling: Something in the Garden by Marcos Sánchez
- Music Videos Jury Award: Desirée Dawson's "Meet You At the Light" by Alexander Farah
  - Special Jury Recognition for Going the Extra Mile: Myd's "Let You Speak" by Dan Carr
- Texas Shorts Jury Award: Folk Frontera by Alejandra Vasquez and Sam Osborn
  - Special Jury Recognition for Vision: Birds by Katherine Propper
- Texas High School Shorts Jury Award: Honeybee by Emilio Vazquez Reyes
  - Special Jury Recognition for Artistic Expression: It's Getting Bad Again by Sarah Reyes
- Episodic Pilot Competition Jury Award: Something Undone by Nicole Dorsey
  - Special Jury Recognition for Unique Vision in Writing and Directing: Pamela Ribon and Sara Gunnarsdóttir for My Year of Dicks

=== Audience awards ===
- Narrative Feature Competition: I Love My Dad by James Morosini
- Documentary Feature Competition: Bad Axe by David Siev
- Narrative Spotlight: Pretty Problems by Kestrin Pantera
- Documentary Spotlight: We Are Not Ghouls by Chris James Thompson
- Headliners: Atlanta (Season 3) by Hiro Murai
- Visions: Shadow by Bruce Gladwin
- Midnighters: Bitch Ass by Bill Posley
- Global: Without Prescription by Juliana Maite
- 24 Beats Per Second: The Return of Tanya Tucker: Featuring Brandi Carlile by Kathlyn Horan
- Festival Favorites: The Art of Making It by Kelcey Edwards
- Narrative Shorts Competition: Aspirational Slut by Caroline Lindy
- Documentary Shorts Competition: The Sentence of Michael Thompson by Kyle Thrash and Haley Elizabeth Anderson
- Animated Shorts Competition: Five Cents by Aaron Hughes
- Midnight Shorts Competition: Tank Fairy by Erich Rettstadt
- Texas Shorts Competition: Act of God by Spencer Cook and Parker Smith
- Music Video Competition: Desirée Dawson's "Meet You At the Light" by Alexander Farah
- Episodic Premieres: 61st Street by Peter Moffat and J. David Shanks
- Episodic Pilot Competition: Brownsville Bred by Elaine Del Valle

=== Special awards ===
- Fandor New Voices Award: What We Leave Behind by Iliana Sosa
- Adam Yauch Hörnblowér Award: Chee$e by Damian Marcano
- Adobe Editing Award: Paul Rogers for Everything Everywhere All at Once
- Louis Black "Lone Star" Award: What We Leave Behind by Iliana Sosa
- ZEISS Cinematography Award: Gio Park for A Vanishing Fog
- Mailchimp Support the Shorts Award: The Voice Actress by Anna J. Takayama
