= Nina Bloomgarden =

American actress

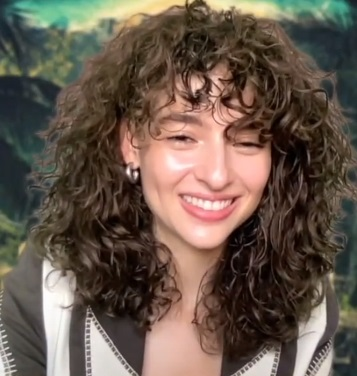
- Bloomgarden in 2022
- Born: February 2, 1998 (age 28); New York, U.S.
- Education: Royal Welsh College of Music & Drama
- Occupation: Actress
- Years active: 2014–present
- Relatives: Kermit Bloomgarden (grandfather)

Nina Quezada Bloomgarden (born February 2, 1998) is an American actress. Her grandfather was theatre producer Kermit Bloomgarden.

== Career ==
In 2021, Bloomgarden could be seen with Kevin Hart in Fatherhood and in 2022, Bloomgarden appeared in Good Girl Jane alongside Andie MacDowell. In the 2022 Peacock television series The Resort, Bloomgarden plays Violet Thompson a tourist who disappeared in 2007 on holiday with her dad played by Nick Offerman, with her disappearance investigated 15 years later by Cristin Milioti and William Jackson Harper. Bloomgarden suggested she used her memories of the loss of her own father shortly before her audition for the role for some of the more emotional scenes in the production and to empathise with the character who had lost her mother. On set she described how she and co-star Skyler Gisondo were able to throw ideas around and improvise a little with the blessing of show creator Andy Siara. Bloomgarden described the familial atmosphere of filming in Puerto Rico saying they were like one big "TV family". Bloomgarden told Grazia magazine that The Resort is “Jurassic Park meets the Twilight Zone” and said the complexity of the story “drew me in”. Bloomgarden also completed principal photography, for a planned 2022 release, for the film Jane alongside Madelaine Petsch, Chloe Bailey and Melissa Leo.

In 2024, Bloomgarden starred in the sci-thriller film It's What's Inside, written and directed by Greg Jardin., playing as Maya.

== Personal life ==
Nina Bloomgarden is the granddaughter of Kermit Bloomgarden. She was born and raised in New York, attending The Beacon School before studying acting at the Royal Welsh College of Music & Drama. She is of Guatemalan descent on her mother's side and of Jewish descent on her father's side.

== Filmography ==
=== Film ===
Year	Title	Role	Notes
2014	Early Light		
2021	Fatherhood	College girl	
2021	Body of the Mined	Blu	Short film; Credited as Nina Quezada Bloomgarden
2022	Jane	Camille	
2022	Good Girl Jane	Emma	
2024	It's What's Inside	Maya	
2024	The Idea of You	Amber	

=== Television ===
Year	Title	Role	Notes	Ref.
2022	The Resort	Violet Thompson	8 episodes	
2026	Maximum Pleasure Guaranteed	Ash	1 episode	
