= Gavin Leatherwood =

American actor (born 1994)

- Born: Gavin Thomas Leatherwood; June 7, 1994 (age 32); Maui, Hawaii, U.S.
- Occupation: Actor
- Years active: 2014–present

Gavin Thomas Leatherwood (born June 7, 1994) is an American actor. He is known for his roles in the Netflix fantasy series Chilling Adventures of Sabrina (2018–2020) and in the HBO Max comedy series The Sex Lives of College Girls (2021).

== Early life ==
Leatherwood was born on June 7, 1994 in Maui, Hawaii. He spent his youth in California and moved to Oregon when he was 18. Leatherwood has one older sister named Chloe. He is mostly of Irish descent with Native American, English, Spanish and Welsh ancestry.

== Career ==
In the beginning of his acting career, Leatherwood performed in various theatrical plays such as All My Sons and Peter Pan. In 2017, he made a cameo appearance in an episode for NCIS and Grown-ish.

In 2018, Leatherwood was cast in the lead male role as Nicholas Scratch in Netflix's supernatural horror series Chilling Adventures of Sabrina. He also made a cameo appearance as Sabrina Carpenter's love interest in the music video for her single "Skin". Leatherwood appears in the main cast in season 1 of the HBO Max teen comedy-drama streaming television series The Sex Lives of College Girls, created by Mindy Kaling in late 2021.

In 2024, Leatherwood starred in the sci-fi thriller film It's What's Inside, written and directed by Greg Jardin.

Apart from acting, Leatherwood released his debut single "Just For Tonight" on February 19, 2021. He has worked with Boom Forest Music, Thomas Dutton and Gavin McDonald to help produce different aspects of this song. He released the single "Driftwood Mermaid" on October 22, 2021. Leatherwood then released "Be My Lover" on April 8, 2022, before releasing his debut EP Moonlighting on October 21, 2022. He plays a variety of instruments including the guitar, ukulele, and piano.

From 2024 to summer 2025, he dated the model Sophie Rothschild.

== Filmography ==
=== Film ===
Year	Title	Role	Notes
2020	Bad Therapy	Spit	
2024	It's What's Inside	Dennis	
TBA	Fade to Black	Spencer	Post-production

=== Television ===
Year	Title	Role	Notes
2017	NCIS	Dezic's Son	Episode: "Pandora's Box, Part I"
2018	Time Being	Honest Man	Episode: "To You/Circles"
2018	Grown-ish	Pete	Episode: "Un-Break My Heart"
2018	My Dead Ex	Bryce	2 episodes
2018–2020	Wicked Enigma	Jason	3 episodes
2018–2020	Chilling Adventures of Sabrina	Nicholas Scratch	Main cast
2021	The Sex Lives of College Girls	Nico Murray	Main cast (season 1)

=== Music videos ===
Year	Title	Role	Artist
2021	"Skin"	Love interest	Sabrina Carpenter
2024	"Sweet Delusion"	Love interest	Bella Poarch

=== Video games ===
Year	Title	Role	Notes
2027	Until Dawn 2	Luke Kelly	
