= The Unbearable Weight of Massive Talent =

2022 American film by Tom Gormican

- Theatrical release poster
- Directed by: Tom Gormican
- Written by: Tom Gormican; Kevin Etten
- Produced by: Nicolas Cage; Mike Nilon; Kristin Burr; Kevin Turen
- Starring: Nicolas Cage; Pedro Pascal; Sharon Horgan; Ike Barinholtz; Alessandra Mastronardi; Jacob Scipio; Neil Patrick Harris; Tiffany Haddish
- Cinematography: Nigel Bluck
- Edited by: Melissa Bretherton
- Music by: Mark Isham
- Production companies: Saturn Films; Burr! Productions
- Distributed by: Lionsgate
- Release dates: March 12, 2022 (SXSW); April 22, 2022 (United States)
- Running time: 107 minutes
- Country: United States
- Languages: English; Spanish
- Budget: $30 million
- Box office: $29.1 million

The Unbearable Weight of Massive Talent is a 2022 American action comedy film directed by Tom Gormican, who co-wrote the screenplay with Kevin Etten. It stars Nicolas Cage as a fictionalized version of himself, along with a supporting cast including Pedro Pascal, Sharon Horgan, Ike Barinholtz, Alessandra Mastronardi, Jacob Scipio, Neil Patrick Harris, Tiffany Haddish and Caroline Boulton.

The film premiered at South by Southwest on March 12, 2022, and was released in the United States on April 22, 2022, by Lionsgate. It received generally positive reviews from critics, with praise for the performances and chemistry of Cage and Pascal, and grossed $29 million against its $30 million budget.

== Plot ==
Hollywood actor Nicolas "Nick" Cage is struggling with his career after being passed over for several major film roles and is constantly pestered and tormented by "Nicky", who appears to him as his younger (and more successful) self. His relationship with his ex-wife Olivia and daughter Addy is also marred by years of emotional neglect.

Losing a key film role and following an embarrassing event at Addy's birthday party, Nick announces his plans to retire from acting. He decides to accept a vague offer of $1 million from his agent Richard Fink involving going to Mallorca to meet billionaire playboy Javi Gutiérrez, to be the guest of honor at his birthday.

Upon meeting Javi, Nick is initially annoyed by his neediness and insistence that they create an improvisational movie based on a script he wrote, but is soon inspired by Javi's determination. The two quickly bond over their surprisingly shared love of films such as The Cabinet of Dr. Caligari and Paddington 2 (the latter of which Nick watches for the first time with Javi).

Soon after, Nick is confronted by CIA agents Vivian and Martin. They suspect that Javi, who they claim made his fortune through arms dealing, is behind the kidnapping of María Delgado. She is the daughter of a Catalan anti-crime politician, whom he hopes to pressure into dropping out of an upcoming election. Nick insists that his acting instincts would have detected if Javi was a criminal, but he eventually decides to help the CIA with the mission.

After successfully rigging the cameras in Javi's compound, Nick attends Javi's birthday party, where he announces his collaboration with Javi on a new movie as an excuse to stay on the compound long enough to find María. After a misadventure involving LSD, Nick and Javi decide that their movie should be about their relationship.

Nick later discovers that Javi keeps a shrine room dedicated to all of his movies, including a wax figure of his character Castor Troy from the film Face/Off, complete with identical golden pistols. Vivian suggests that Nick includes a kidnapping in their script, to get Javi's reaction to it.

Nick explains this new idea to Javi, who believes that he must be distracted by his family issues. Vivian tells Nick to flee, or possibly kill Javi, as he has discovered their plot. But Javi reveals he has brought Nick's family to his villa. Nick tries to make amends with them, but they reject his appeal and accuse him of prioritizing his film career over his family.

Javi privately goes to meet with his cousin Lucas, who is revealed to be the true arms dealer and the one who kidnapped María. Lucas warns him that Nick is working with the CIA and pressures him to kill him, or else Lucas will kill Javi.

Nick and Javi face off, but neither can bring himself to kill the other. Lucas sends his men after both of them, and they race back to the house to discover that Addy has also been kidnapped. Nick takes Javi, Olivia and Javi's assistant Gabriela to the CIA safe house, but the house has been compromised: Martin has been killed, and Vivian sacrifices herself to kill Lucas's men before they can ambush the group. With Javi's help, Nick and Olivia pose as a reclusive criminal couple to get close to Lucas. He figures out their plan, but they still manage to escape with Addy and María.

Nick, Addy, Olivia and María race to the American embassy while Javi and Gabriela stay behind to delay Lucas's pursuit. Upon arrival, Lucas holds Nick at gunpoint, but Addy tosses him a knife which he uses to kill him—transitioning into the movie that Nick and Javi completed, presumably based on their adventure. Nick is applauded for his new film and congratulates Javi before going home with his family to watch Paddington 2, now with a better relationship.

== Cast ==
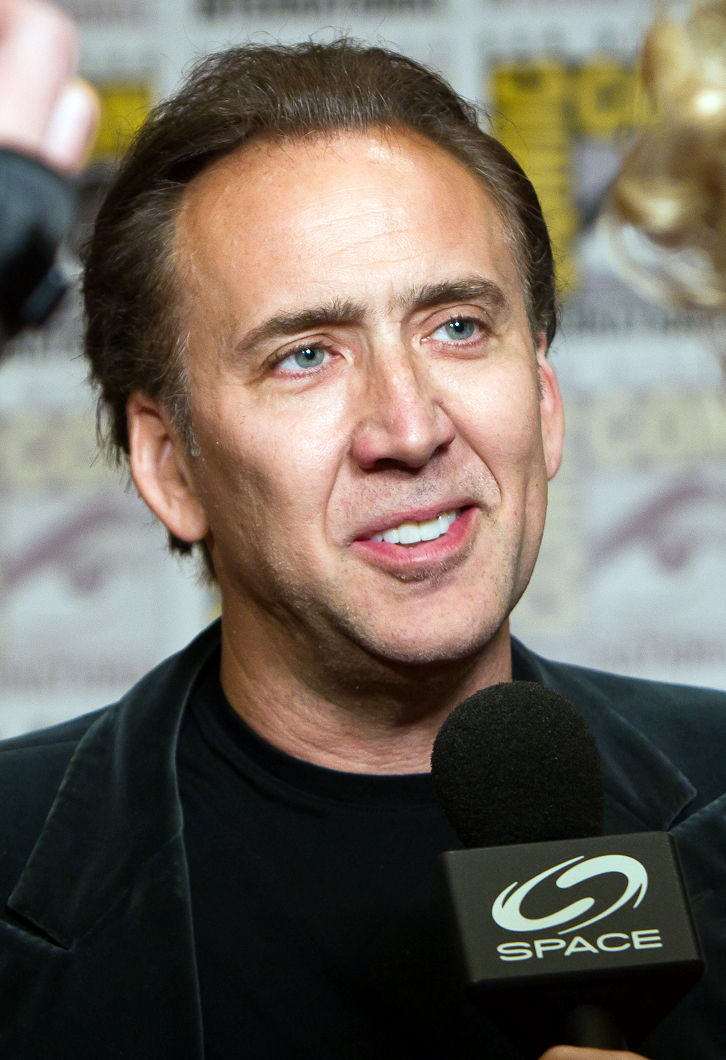
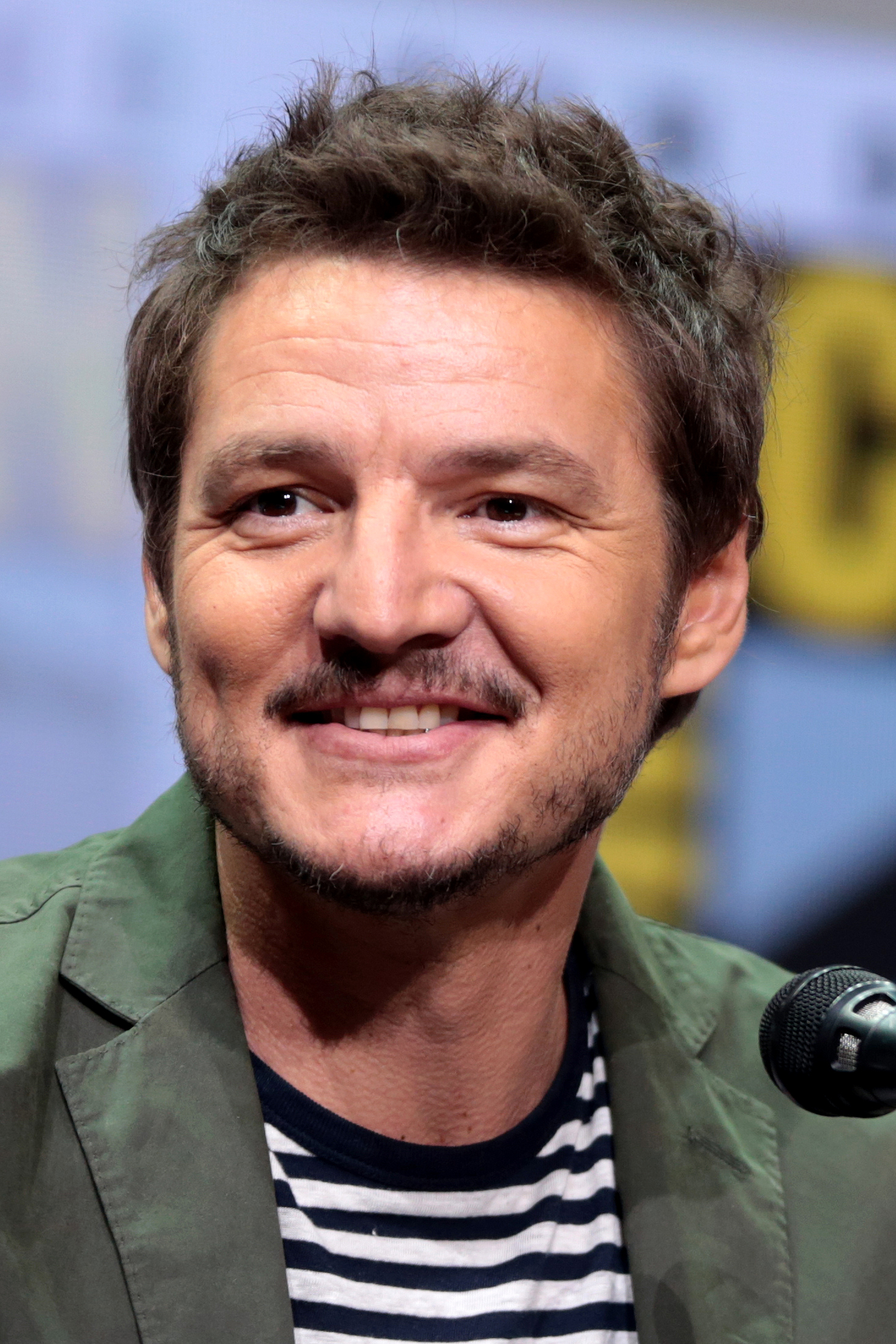
Nicolas Cage (left) stars as a fictionalized version of himself who attends the birthday party of a rich superfan played by Pedro Pascal (right).
- Nicolas Cage as Nick Cage, a fictionalized version of himself
  - Cage also portrays Nicky Cage (credited by Cage's birth name Nicolas Kim Coppola), a figment of Cage's imagination, seen as a younger version of himself. The character is based on the actor's appearance on the talk show Wogan while promoting Wild at Heart.
- Pedro Pascal as Javi Gutiérrez, a billionaire and Cage superfan who pays Cage $1 million to appear at his birthday party
- Sharon Horgan as Olivia Henson, a retired film makeup artist and Cage's ex-wife
- Lily Mo Sheen (credited as Lily Sheen) as Addy Cage, Cage's daughter
- Tiffany Haddish as Vivian Etten, a CIA agent and Martin's partner
- Ike Barinholtz as Martin Etten, a CIA agent and Vivian's partner
- Alessandra Mastronardi as Gabriela Lucchesi, Javi's assistant
- Paco León as Lucas Gutiérrez, Javi's cousin and an infamous arms dealer
- Jacob Scipio as Carlos, one of Lucas's men
- Neil Patrick Harris as Richard Fink, Cage's agent
- Katrin Vankova as María Delgado, the kidnapping victim
- David Gordon Green as himself, a film director who declines to give Cage a role in his new film
- Demi Moore as "Olivia Cage", Cage's in-movie fictional ex-wife
- Joanna Bobin as Cheryl, Cage's therapist

== Production ==
=== Development ===
Cage plays a fictionalised version of himself who he said bore little resemblance to his real offscreen personality. He originally turned down the role "three or four times" but changed his mind after writer-director Tom Gormican wrote him a personal letter. On November 15, 2019, Lionsgate acquired the production rights. In August 2020, Pedro Pascal entered negotiations to star. In September 2020, Sharon Horgan and Tiffany Haddish joined the cast, and Lily Sheen was added in October. In November 2020, Neil Patrick Harris joined the cast.

The movie bears similarities to My Favorite Year, and Harris paraphrases Peter O'Toole's character from that movie when he reminds Cage that he is not an actor, he is a movie star.

The movie's title alludes to the novel (later made into a film) The Unbearable Lightness of Being, and possibly to the memoir A Heartbreaking Work of Staggering Genius.

=== Filming ===
Principal photography began on October 5, 2020, and wrapped on November 24, 2020. Most of the movie was shot in Hungary, with some locations in Croatia, areas around the city of Dubrovnik. Director Tom Gormican contracted COVID-19 during filming and was forced to direct some scenes via iPad.

=== Music ===
Mark Isham composed the music.

== Release ==
The film premiered at the 2022 South by Southwest Film Festival on March 12. Originally set to be released on March 19, 2021, the film was theatrically released on April 22, 2022, in the United States.

=== Home media ===
The film was released for VOD on June 7, 2022, followed by a Blu-ray, DVD and 4K UHD release on June 21, 2022. The film was released to Starz on October 21, 2022, six months after its theatrical release.

== Reception ==
=== Box office ===
The Unbearable Weight of Massive Talent grossed $20.3 million in the United States and Canada, and $8.8 million in other territories, for a worldwide total of $29.1 million.

In United States and Canada, it was released alongside The Bad Guys and The Northman, and was projected to gross $5–10 million from 3,036 theaters in its opening weekend. It made $2.9 million on its first day, including $835,000 from Thursday night previews. It went on to debut to $7.1 million, finishing fifth at the box office. Deadline Hollywood noted that The Unbearable Weight of Massive Talent and The Northman were targeting the same demographic, which impacted their debuts. Deadline also mentioned the film's low awareness level at the time of its release and Cage's absence on social media as reasons it did not perform better. Men made up 59% of the audience during its opening, with those in the age range of 18–34 comprising 57% of ticket sales. The film made $3.9 million in its second weekend, finishing sixth, $1.6 million in its third, finishing eighth, and $1.1 million in its fourth, finishing tenth. It dropped out of the box office top ten in its fifth weekend with $754,976.

=== Critical response ===
On the review aggregator website Rotten Tomatoes, 87% of 309 critics' reviews are positive, with an average rating of 7.3/10. The website's consensus reads: "Smart, funny, and wildly creative, The Unbearable Weight of Massive Talent presents Nicolas Cage in peak gonzo form—and he's matched by Pedro Pascal's scene-stealing performance." Metacritic, which uses a weighted average, assigned the film a score of 68 out of 100, based on 52 critics, indicating "generally favorable" reviews. Audiences polled by CinemaScore gave the film an average grade of "B+" on an A+ to F scale, while those at PostTrak gave it an 82% positive score, with 66% saying they would definitely recommend it.
