= In the Court of the Crimson King: King Crimson at 50 =

- Theatrical poster
- Directed by: Toby Amies
- Produced by: Toby Amies; Nick Freand Jones; David Singleton
- Edited by: Ollie Huddleston
- Music by: King Crimson
- Production companies: Discipline Global Mobile; Succulent Pictures
- Distributed by: Monoduo Films
- Release date: 14 March 2022 (South by Southwest)
- Running time: 86 minutes
- Country: United Kingdom
- Language: English
- Box office: $68,776

In the Court of the Crimson King: King Crimson at 50 is a 2022 music documentary film about the British progressive rock band King Crimson. It was directed and co-produced by Toby Amies. The film follows the final eight-piece incarnation of the band throughout their 50th anniversary tour from 2018 until 2020, complemented with interviews with past members and archival footage of TV broadcasts and concert performances throughout their years of activity.

The documentary features former and current members of the band such as Adrian Belew, Bill Bruford, Mel Collins, Michael Giles, Trey Gunn, Gavin Harrison, Jakko Jakszyk, Tony Levin, Pat Mastelotto, Jamie Muir, Pete Sinfield, David Singleton, Jeremy Stacey and Ian McDonald. The main action, however, revolves around the personality of co-founder and bandleader Robert Fripp, his personal philosophy and relationships with bandmates. Significant time is also dedicated to Bill Rieflin and his involvement in the band whilst suffering from cancer; the film was dedicated jointly to Rieflin, who died in 2020, and Amies' mother Elizabeth. The film also includes interviews with several fans of the band, most notably, Norwegian nun, sister Dana Benedicta from Dominicaines de Notre-Dame de Grâce, Oslo.

The film premiered on 14 March 2022 at South by Southwest film festival and was positively received by the critics.

== Production ==
The idea to create a film about King Crimson was born in winter 2017 when Robert Fripp met director Toby Amies at a Christmas party in Brighton, where both live, and got to talking about filmmaking. Later Fripp recruited Amies to produce a documentary about the band, commemorating its 50th anniversary. Amies agreed "with no idea of how hard that would be to make". The reported initial title of the documentary was "Cosmic FuKc", which was a reference to The Man Whose Mind Exploded, a previous work by Amies liked by Fripp.

King Crimson manager David Singleton said that Amies was asked to "reimagine the format" of the music documentary and was given "complete creative freedom". The director confirmed that he had no editorial interference from Fripp, claiming that only one former or current band member reserved the right to make some changes regarding their appearance in the film. Amies "spent a long time getting my subjects comfortable" before "taking a picture of that relationship" within the band. He closely followed the band in 2018-2019 during 50th anniversary tour, adding interviews alongside some historical footage. However, no clear overview of the band's history was provided as the director focused on "personality rather than performance, relationship rather than recording" of former and current King Crimson members described as the "complete opposite of how a documentary is done". Another method used by Amies was the decision "to write himself into the story" including off-camera questions and personal comments. The Guardian compared film with "an episode of The Office but with huge drum kits, grizzled roadies and rapturous fans".

Described as a "modern form of roving Cinéma-Verité", the camerawork by Amies, although criticized by the filmmaker himself, captures the natural state within the band, resulting in some shots even being out of focus.

== Release ==
The release of the documentary was announced in a 2019 press conference by Fripp that also featured a screening of a few brief clips.

The premiere of the film took place on 14 March 2022 at the South by Southwest festival. The film was also shown at the IFI Documentary festival, Gothenburg Film Festival, and DOK.fest München. For one day only on 19 October, it entered a limited theatrical release in the US and on 22 October received a separate screening in London.

The DVD was released on 2 December 2022, which included music from the soundtrack, a 23-minute edit from the early version of the film, a 38-minute short film of additional backstage footage, and the final performance by the band on 8 December 2021 in Tokyo.

On 8 November 2023 there was a wider theatrical release across North America, and on 1 December 2023 the documentary was made available on streaming platforms.

== Reception ==
The film was generally very well received critically. On the review aggregator website Rotten Tomatoes, 95% of 21 critics' reviews are positive. Metacritic, which uses a weighted average, assigned the film a score of 80 out of 100, based on 8 critics, indicating "generally favorable" reviews.

Iowa Public Radio called it a "love letter to making music". Leslie Felperin of the Guardian awarded 4 out 5 stars to "a rollicking workplace comedy" that "ends up being about a lot more than just King Crimson". The Variety called it "as good as rock documentaries get" and National Review deemed it "one of the finest rock documentaries ever made". Mojo compared the film with King Rocker and Dig! saying that "it goes straight into the pantheon of those documentaries, which enable us to appreciate the painful truth of what being in band is actually like". The Telegraph concludes that "by turns comical and melancholy, it may be the most revealing film about working life in a band since Spinal Tap". Uncut gave the film 9 out of 10 calling it "more than just historical documentary", while The Observer awarded 4 out of 5 stars concluding that "the film is angular and abrasive, exacting and playful, extremely funny and achingly melancholy". Hank Shteamer of Rolling Stone summarized film as "elegant, intimate, funny and surprisingly moving [that] covers every aspect of the group".

Boston Herald gave the film C+ saying that it was a "dull take on the practices and insanely disciplined methods of Fripp".
