= Linoleum (film) =

2022 film by Colin West

- Theatrical release poster
- Directed by: Colin West
- Written by: Colin West
- Produced by: Chadd Harbold; Chad Simpson; Dennis Masel
- Starring: Jim Gaffigan; Rhea Seehorn; Katelyn Nacon; Gabriel Rush; Michael Ian Black; Tony Shalhoub
- Cinematography: Ed Wu
- Edited by: Keara Burton
- Music by: Mark Hadley
- Production companies: Sub-Sequential; Storm City Films; Brain Scratch Productions
- Distributed by: Shout! Studios
- Release dates: March 12, 2022 (SXSW); February 24, 2023 (United States)
- Running time: 101 minutes
- Country: United States
- Language: English
- Box office: $101,128

Linoleum is a 2022 American science fiction comedy-drama film written and directed by Colin West and starring Jim Gaffigan.

The film premiered at the 2022 South by Southwest Film Festival on March 12. It was released in select theaters in the United States on February 24, 2023, by Shout! Studios.

== Plot ==
Cameron Edwin is a middle-aged astronomer who lives an unfulfilling life in small-town Ohio. Cameron, who aspired to be an astronaut, hosts an unsuccessful science education show on a local TV station while juggling a dysfunctional home life with his wife, Erin, who is divorcing him, his rebellious teenage daughter, Nora, and his silent young son, Sam.

While cycling home from work one day, a red sports car falls from the sky behind Cameron. Upon inspection, Cameron discovers an unconscious man in the front seat who closely resembles him. When he recounts these events at dinner, Erin is skeptical, suggesting that the car hit the curb and flipped over. During breakfast the next day, Cameron reads an article about the man in the newspaper. He is Kent Armstrong, a successful astronaut.

At her high school, a new student, Marc, who shares Nora’s birthday of October 31st, is seated in front of her in a math class, much to her interest.

At work, Cameron interrupts a meeting between the producer and Kent, who is unharmed and has no memory of the incident. Privately, the producer informs Cameron that PBS is interested in acquiring the series, but only if Kent becomes its host, with Cameron being reduced to a ‘creative consultant.’ Angered, Cameron protests, but is told by the producer that as the local station is the majority owner of the show, he has no say in the matter. Cameron decides to walk from the show instead. As Cameron arrives at the family’s home, he discovers his family outside and the authorities, who tell them a Russian spacecraft fell into his backyard and that his house is a site of evidence, necessitating Cameron and his family move in with Erin’s sister, who dislikes him.

After school, Nora and Marc strike up a conversation, with Nora expressing a social, but not romantic, interest in him. Marc is then picked up by his father, Kent. Upon arriving home, Marc walks through the neighborhood, where he finds Cameron at the family’s house. The two trespass and see the wreckage, agreeing that it is likely American in origin. Cameron recalls that he once wanted to be an astronaut, and Marc suggests he make a rocket from the remains of the spacecraft. In the distance, the two see an elderly woman, who walks away when Cameron tries to talk to her. Cameron begins to tinker with the components in the family’s garage, much to Erin’s vexation.

At night, Marc and Nora wander through the town. Although Marc jokingly calls it a date, Nora insists that she is attracted to women. The two nevertheless form a strong bond.

Cameron visits his father, Mac, a retired NASA engineer, at an assisted living facility. Mac has dementia, and the doctor encourages Cameron to converse with Mac and keep him mentally stimulated. Although he cannot always recognize Cameron, Mac retains an impeccable memory for advanced technical detail, and Cameron checks Mac out of the assisted living facility. The two start living in the family’s home and working on the rocket, and Mac returns to his old room, which has an astronaut’s costume with a broken visor.

Wandering through the neighborhood after Church, Marc finds Cameron in the family home’s back yard, and says that he sees him as a better version of Kent, whom he once admired but has become disillusioned with. While sneaking out to see Nora, Marc again runs into Cameron, who is drinking after the rocket boosters burst into flames during a test. Cameron expresses disappointment with the trajectory of his life and encourages Marc not to waste his. The two see the elderly woman again, and Cameron wonders if she is following him or Marc.

That night, Marc and Nora hang out, and Marc reveals he received an invitation to popular girl Darcy’s Halloween party, making Nora jealous. Nora confesses she is unsure of her own sexuality. The two agree to host their own Halloween party instead. They promote the event at school, earning Darcy’s ire.

During class, Darcy publicly humiliates Marc. In retaliation, Nora punches Darcy in the face, requiring the two to get picked up by their parents. In the car on the way back, Nora gets into a fight with Erin. At their home, Kent forbids Marc from interacting with Erin and threatens to kill Marc if he interacts with her again. Kent then lashes Marc’s forearm with a small scourge, telling him “you’re doing this to yourself.”

The next day, Cameron discovers Erin in the garage, and the two reconcile, working on the rocket together. On Halloween night, Marc decides to sneak out to join Nora at their Halloween party, unaware that his father spotted him. Nora and Marc subsequently get their photo taken together, with Marc wearing the astronaut costume, although the visor is undamaged.

Mac wakes up in his bed in the astronaut costume, with the elderly woman by his side. She shows him a picture of the two of them when they were younger, the same one taken of Marc and Nora at the Halloween party. It is revealed that ‘Mac’ is in fact an elderly Cameron, and that the old woman is Erin. Struggling with dementia, the events of the film are the fragmented memories of Cameron, with ‘Marc’ and ‘Nora’ being Cameron and Erin when the two were younger. Erin asks Cameron if he recalls his father trying to run him over that night, causing the settings and characters to begin to merge in Cameron’s mind. Experiencing a medical emergency, Cameron tries to get up, telling Erin ‘the launch’ is about to start. Erin tries to tell Cameron that there is no launch and there never was a rocket, but ultimately acquiesces, leading Cameron to an ambulance.

Meanwhile, the middle-aged Cameron and Erin begin the launch of the rocket, a large, 2D cardboard rocket that had previously appeared as a small prop in Cameron’s show, only for all three scenes (the ambulance, the launch and the party) to be interrupted by the revving of Kent’s sports car, as Kent drives the car towards Marc at a high speed.

The film cuts to the middle-aged Cameron confronting Kent, mirroring Marc’s dialogue expressing disillusionment with his father earlier. The middle-aged Cameron asks Kent why he did it, with Kent again saying “you did this to yourself.” The middle-aged Cameron disagrees, and the film cuts back to Kent in the car, who swerves, shattering Marc’s helmet but leaving him unscathed, with the sharp turn causing the car to flip over. Simultaneously, the middle-aged Cameron and Erin take off in the rocket, and the ambulance with the elderly Cameron and Erin drives away.

== Cast ==
- Jim Gaffigan as Cameron Edwin/Kent Armstrong
- Rhea Seehorn as Erin Edwin
- Katelyn Nacon as Nora Edwin
- Gabriel Rush as Marc
- Tony Shalhoub as Dr. Alvin
- Michael Ian Black as Tony
- Amy Hargreaves as Linda
- Jay Walker as Mr. Fuller
- West Duchovny as Darcy
- Roger Hendricks Simon as Mac

== Production ==
Filming wrapped in New York City in November 2020.

== Reception ==
On the review aggregator website Rotten Tomatoes, the film holds an approval rating of 82% based on 76 reviews, with an average rating of 6.9/10. The critical consensus reads, "A solid showcase for Jim Gaffigan as well as a sneakily ambitious dramedy, Linoleum adds another impressive entry to writer-director Colin West's filmography."

Alan Ng of Film Threat rated the film an 8.5 out of 10, calling it "a heartfelt and touching movie about finding joy and fulfillment in life."

Ross Bonaime of Collider graded the film an A− and wrote, "With this film about people trying to find what makes them extraordinary, West has made an extraordinary tale of the personal universes we all inhabit, the strange messiness of life, and the beauty of how everything all shakes out in the end."

Trace Sauveur of The Austin Chronicle gave the film a positive review and wrote, "...a surprising and poignant reflection on what it means to live a fulfilling life, the memories and evocations of which will swell within you long after they've passed."

Brian Tallerico of RogerEbert.com gave the film a mixed review, calling it "a film with so many good ideas, especially in its final ten minutes, but without the clear vision to coalesce them into something that works from beginning to end."

Mae Abdulbaki of Screen Rant awarded the film three stars out of five and wrote, "While the film doesn't always soar to its potential, it offers a fascinating, resplendent look at regret and the untapped potential of their youth."

Angie Han of The Hollywood Reporter gave the film a positive review "in many ways a small movie, concerned with not much more than this limited circle of people trying to figure out how to understand their own lives" and wrote, "But thoughtful performances and earnest (if especially subtle) writing keep the film compelling enough until its final minutes, which are even more startling in their heart-wrenching effectiveness than in their mind-bending twists."

Pete Hammond of Deadline Hollywood gave the film a positive review and wrote, "For me Linoleum is a pleasant enough, if somewhat less than memorable ride that doesn't really take flight like you might hope it would. For Gaffigan fans though that should be enough."

Robert Daniels of IndieWire graded the film a B and wrote, "Linoleum is an otherworldly tragedy about endings and beginnings, and the existential rot whose origins feel unknown."

Matt Donato of IGN gave the film a positive review and wrote, "Director Colin West plucks heartstrings that inspire our zest for lives lived to the fullest, delivered through both peaceful and aggressive means."

Ethan Anderton of Slash Film gave the film a positive review and wrote, "Jim Gaffigan has easily delivered a career-best performance in Linoleum."

Variety wrote: "It’s also a movie that, not unlike “The Usual Suspects” or “Jacob’s Ladder,” likely will drive some viewers to opt for an instant replay after closing credits roll by, to see if that final twist actually does a watertight job of answering and explaining."
