= Reina Hardesty =

American actress

- Born: January 3, 1996 (age 30)
- Occupation: Actress

Reina Hardesty (born January 3, 1996) is an American actress. After playing supporting roles in the television series Greenhouse Academy, StartUp and The Flash, she landed lead breakthrough roles in Brockmire and Butterfly. She has also appeared in the films What Comes Around and It's What's Inside.

== Early life and education ==
Reina Hardesty was born on January 3, 1996, to Greg Hardesty and Manako Ihaya, and is Japanese-American. When Hardesty was 13 years old, her father, at the time a reporter for The Orange County Register, wrote a column about receiving a phone service statement with over 14,000 texts recorded in one month, most of which were from Hardesty's texting activity. Television and print outlets in the US and Europe ran stories on Hardesty and her texting behavior, including a segment aired on the syndicated news and entertainment program Inside Edition.

== Career ==
Hardesty was cast in the Netflix original series Greenhouse Academy in 2016, joining an ensemble cast of regulars. She followed the Greenhouse Academy role with the recurring role of Stella Namura on the Crackle series StartUp, and in 2020 joined the final season of the IFC series Brockmire in the role of Beth, the daughter of Jim Brockmire. Hardesty portrayed the character Joss Mardon, also known as Weather Witch, in the television series The Flash. She appeared in multiple episodes during the show's fourth and fifth seasons. Hardesty also reprised the role in an episode of DC's Legends of Tomorrow.

In early 2020, Hardesty was cast in the role of Kit, the daughter of the American president, in the CW original series Maverick, but the show's production was paused due to the COVID-19 pandemic, leaving its future unclear. Hardesty was also originally cast in a lead role in a spinoff of The Boys, but was one of multiple actors to leave the show in 2022 when the series showrunners changed their characters before the show aired.

As Brit, the best friend of the lead character Anna in the 2022 Amy Redford film What Comes Around, Hardesty put in a performance that reviewer Marya Gates observed was so "dynamic" that it outshone the performance of the lead actress. Hardesty appeared as Brooke in the 2024 film It's What's Inside, which was shown at the Sundance Film Festival and acquired by Netflix, but Rolling Stone reviewer David Fear noted that her character lacked sufficient development even when compared to the thin characterizations of the film's other roles.

In 2025, Hardesty starred opposite Daniel Dae Kim in the Amazon Prime Video spy thriller series Butterfly as Rebecca Jung, a sociopathic assassin. Writing for Collider, reviewer Jasneet Singh described Hardesty's performance as "impeccable". Los Angeles Times television critic Robert Lloyd identified the performances of Hardesty and Kim as strong points in Butterfly, while suggesting they would be more interesting to watch together in a different kind of series.
