= What Comes Around (film) =

2022 film by Amy Redford

- Theatrical release poster
- Directed by: Amy Redford
- Written by: Scott Organ
- Based on: The Thing With Feathers by Scott Organ
- Produced by: Amy Redford; Eden Wurmfeld; Lynda Weinman
- Starring: Summer Phoenix; Grace Van Dien; Jesse Garcia; Kyle Gallner; Indiana Affleck; Reina Hardesty; Sierra Nicole Rose
- Cinematography: Bobby Bukowski
- Edited by: Emilie Mahdavian
- Music by: Craig Wedren
- Production company: Jeff Hays Films
- Distributed by: IFC Films
- Release dates: September 15, 2022 (TIFF); August 4, 2023
- Running time: 83 minutes
- Country: United States
- Language: English
- Box office: $5,935

What Comes Around is a 2022 American drama-thriller film, directed and produced by Amy Redford, from a screenplay by Scott Organ, based upon his play The Thing With Feathers. It stars Summer Phoenix, Grace Van Dien, Jesse Garcia, Kyle Gallner, Indiana Affleck, Reina Hardesty and Sierra Nicole Rose.

It had its world premiere at the 2022 Toronto International Film Festival on September 15, 2022, and was released on August 4, 2023, by IFC Films.

== Plot ==
Anna is talking to a boy she met online named Eric. They discuss Emily Dickinson. She tells her friend, Brit, that he is older. Beth, Anna's mother, has just gotten engaged to her boyfriend, Tim, who is a police officer. Anna's 17th birthday arrives, and Eric has a gift for her. He FaceTimes her, and it appears he is outside her house. Anna is freaked out, but she opens the door for him. He hands her a collection of Emily Dickinson poems with a note on one of them that says it reminds him of her. She decides to give him a chance, and the two of them take a walk in the park where he tells her he is 28 years old. He tells her he lied because he was nervous when he met her. The two of them hug, and it appears he is going to leave.

Later that day, Beth and Tim are setting up for Anna's birthday party. Anna wakes up in bed with Eric next to her. Her friends are coming to take her out for her birthday, and she tells Eric he has to stay there until she gets home because there is no way for him to get past Beth and Tim. He is unhappy about the situation. Tim leaves, and while Beth showers, Eric leaves. When Anna comes home, she looks for Eric, but he isn't there, and he doesn't answer her texts.

She tells Brit about meeting Eric, and Brit warns her to be careful. Eric calls from a truck stop on his way home to apologize for leaving. They begin texting often, and Anna becomes distracted. She tells Beth and Tim that she has a boyfriend. When Beth asks how old he is, Anna says he's in his mid-20s. Beth becomes concerned, especially when she learns they're having sex. Anna introduces Eric, who was waiting outside, to Beth and Tim. Beth is visibly shaken by meeting Eric, and he attempts to explain his and Anna's relationship, causing Beth to leave the room. Tim goes after her to talk, but Beth insists that Eric leave. Anna says she will leave with him, so Beth asks to speak to Eric alone. It appears they know one another, and after a brief private conversation, he leaves.

Moping, Anna refuses to speak to Beth afterward. Beth, a real estate agent, is showing a house when Eric shows up. His real name is Jesse, and Beth had been his teacher 12 years ago. She had developed an attachment to him, but he thought things were different. He told the authorities that they'd had a physical relationship when they hadn't. She asks him to get help, but he becomes angry and demands she admit she had been in love with him back then. Tim shows up to retrieve Beth, and he threatens to arrest Jesse if he doesn't leave the family alone. Jesse leaves, and Beth tells Tim what really happened.

Beth tells Anna the truth about Jesse, and she becomes upset. Tim has a patrol car stationed on their street. Anna attempts to reach out to Jesse through texts, but he is unresponsive. He eventually apologizes, and the two meet again at the park.

Beth is getting ready for her engagement party when Jesse sneaks in. His behavior is threatening, and he asks to show her something. Beth finds Anna's bags packed in her closet because she plans to leave with him. Jesse shows Beth a picture in Anna's room that he recognizes from the year he knew her, and her hair is short. He tells her he has distinct memories of it being long and has a meltdown in which he questions his version of the story, believing he might be delusional after all. Beth confesses that she had been in love with him and that they'd had sex. She apologizes and tells him she regrets it. He reveals a tape recorder, telling Beth he has her confession on tape. Anna appears and prepares to leave with Jesse. She asks him to forgive Beth, so he leaves the tape recorder behind. He leaves while Anna says goodbye to Beth, and Beth reveals to Anna that Jesse has left her.

Anna and Beth arrive at the party, both in shock. Beth thanks Anna for saving her, but Anna tells her all she saved her from was going to prison. She steps out of the car and tells Beth that it’s her party and she should smile.

== Cast ==
- Summer Phoenix as Beth
- Grace Van Dien as Anna
- Jesse Garcia as Tim
- Kyle Gallner as Eric / Jesse
- Indiana Affleck as Denny
- Reina Hardesty as Brit
- Sierra Nicole Rose as Ashley

== Production ==
Scott Organ sent Amy Redford his play The Thing With Feathers, with Redford wanting to adapt it into a feature film. Principal photography took place in Park City, Utah during the COVID-19 pandemic.

== Release ==
The film, then titled Roost, had its world premiere at the 2022 Toronto International Film Festival on September 15, 2022. In October 2022, IFC Films acquired United States distribution rights to the film, and re-titled the film What Comes Around. It was released on August 4, 2023.

== Reception ==
On the review aggregator website Rotten Tomatoes, 30% of 27 critics' reviews are positive, with an average rating of 4.7/10.
