= The Lost City (2022 film) =

2022 film by Aaron and Adam Nee

- Theatrical release poster
- Directed by: Aaron Nee; Adam Nee
- Screenplay by: Oren Uziel; Dana Fox; Adam Nee; Aaron Nee
- Story by: Seth Gordon
- Produced by: Liza Chasin; Sandra Bullock; Seth Gordon
- Starring: Sandra Bullock; Channing Tatum; Daniel Radcliffe; Da'Vine Joy Randolph; Brad Pitt
- Cinematography: Jonathan Sela
- Edited by: Craig Alpert
- Music by: Pinar Toprak
- Production companies: Fortis Films; 3dot Productions; Exhibit A
- Distributed by: Paramount Pictures
- Release dates: March 12, 2022 (SXSW); March 25, 2022 (United States)
- Running time: 112 minutes
- Country: United States
- Language: English
- Budget: $68–74 million
- Box office: $192.9 million

The Lost City is a 2022 American action-adventure comedy film directed by Aaron and Adam Nee, who co-wrote the screenplay with Oren Uziel and Dana Fox, based on a story by Seth Gordon. Starring Sandra Bullock, Channing Tatum, Daniel Radcliffe, Da'Vine Joy Randolph and Brad Pitt, the film follows a romance novelist and her cover model, who must escape a billionaire who wants her to find a lost ancient burial chamber described in one of her books.

The project was announced in October 2020 with Bullock joining as producer and star and Tatum joining that December; the rest of the cast was announced the following year. Filming took place in the Dominican Republic from May to August 2021. The film premiered at South by Southwest on March 12, 2022, and was theatrically released by Paramount Pictures in the United States on March 25, 2022. It received generally positive reviews from critics and grossed over $190 million worldwide against a $68 million budget.

== Plot ==
Loretta Sage, a former archaeology researcher, writes romance-adventure novels featuring the fictional Dr. Angela Lovemore and her romantic interest, Dash McMahon. To promote her latest book, her publisher, Beth Hatten, puts her on a book tour with Alan Caprison, the cover model for Dash, despite her reclusiveness since her husband's death five years ago.

After a disastrous start, mostly due to the fans' obsession with Alan's Dash persona, Loretta is brought before billionaire Abigail Fairfax. He has discovered a lost city on a remote volcanic Atlantic island and is convinced that the Crown of Fire, a priceless treasure belonging to the ancient King Kalaman and Queen Taha, is located there. Knowing the books were partially based on Loretta's research, Fairfax wants her to decipher an ancient clue to the treasure. When she declines, he sedates her and flies her to the island.

Alan, who is secretly enamored with Loretta, witnesses her kidnapping. He contacts former Navy SEAL turned CIA operative Jack Trainer. Following her smart watch's location, they begin a rescue.

Jack breaches Fairfax's compound and frees Loretta. However, as the trio attempts to flee, Jack is shot in the head by Fairfax's mercenaries. Loretta and Alan escape into the jungle.

The pair spend a day running from Fairfax's henchmen, then spend a night in a hammock in the jungle, before reaching a nearby village. Upon hearing a local singing a folk song, Loretta deduces that the crown is hidden in a cenote in the jungle. However, Fairfax's group captures her, and then Alan when he chases them on a motorcycle. Fairfax forces them to reveal the treasure's location.

After traveling to the tombsite by boat, they discover it is not a treasure-filled monument of Taha and Kalaman's power, but a secret place for the queen to grieve her husband's death. Her Crown of Fire was made of red seashells the king gathered to show his love for her. The actual treasure of the legend was the inseparable love between the king and queen.

Enraged, Fairfax seals Loretta and Alan inside the tomb as the volcano erupts. Rafi, one of Fairfax's henchmen, has a change of heart and leaves a crowbar inside the tomb, so they can free themselves. Rafi then takes the boat and abandons Fairfax on the island. Loretta and Alan escape by swimming through an underwater tunnel with the current.

Beth arrives with the local coast guard, who rescue Loretta and Alan and arrest Fairfax. Sometime later, Loretta's next book, based on her adventure with Alan, is a success, and they share a kiss on the beach at the end of the book tour.

In a mid-credits scene, Loretta and Alan attend a meditation class where they unexpectedly meet Jack, who survived being shot in the head.

== Cast ==
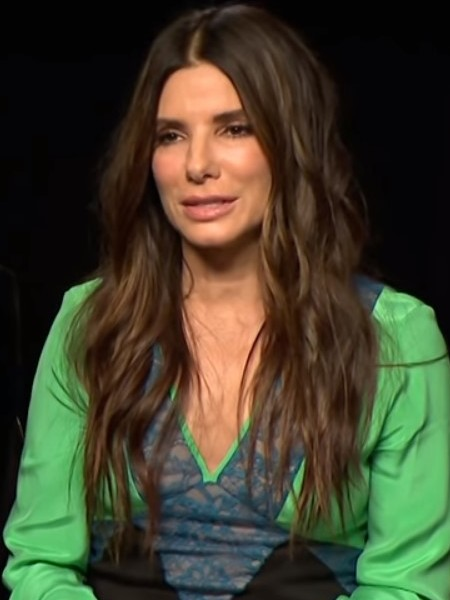
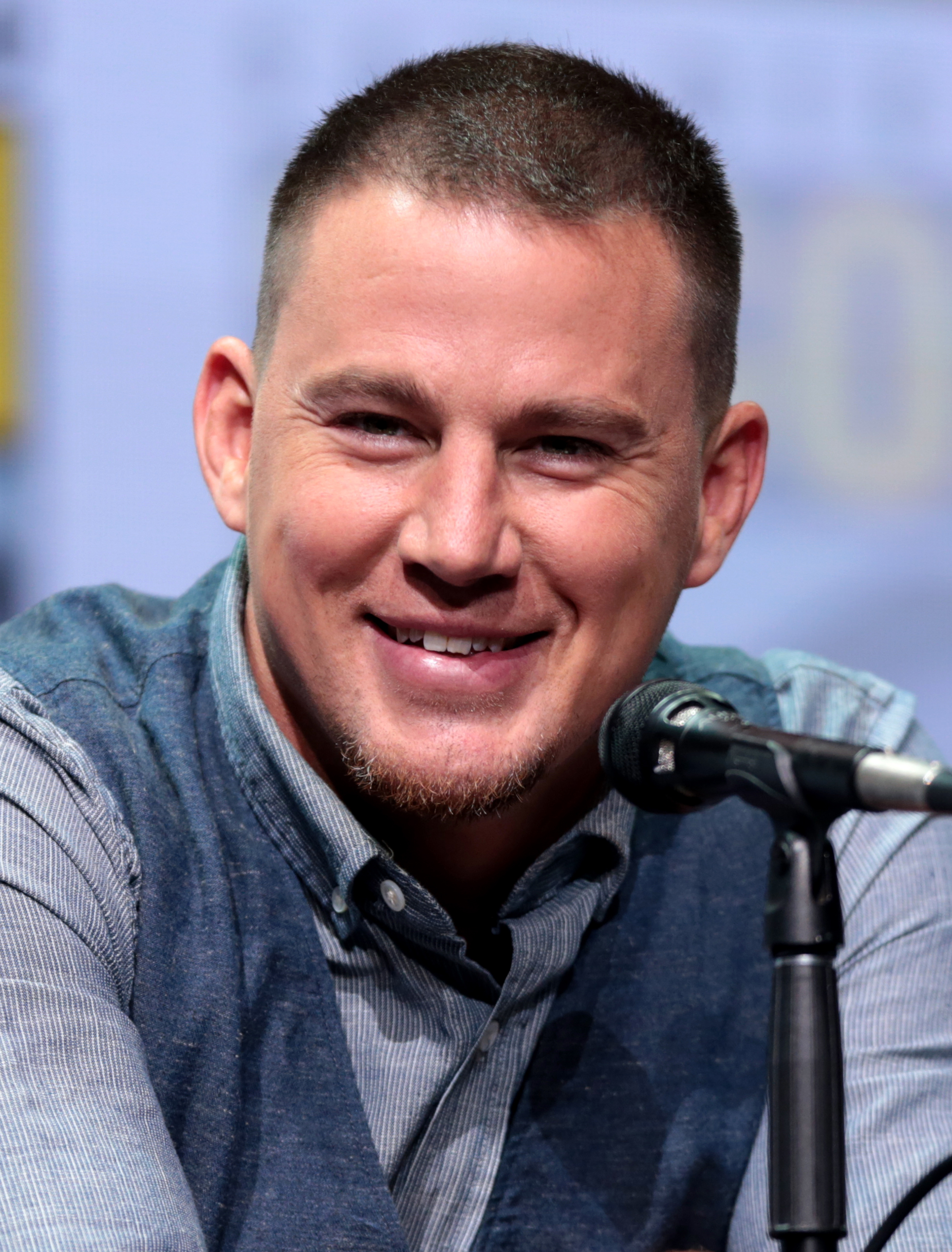
Sandra Bullock and Channing Tatum star as Loretta Sage and Alan Caprison, respectively
- Sandra Bullock as Loretta Sage, a successful yet depressed and reclusive best-selling romance novelist/archaeology researcher.
  - Bullock also plays Dr. Angela Lovemore, the heroine in her book series.
- Channing Tatum as Alan Caprison, a dimwitted cover model for Loretta's novel The Lost City of D.
  - Tatum also plays Dash McMahon, the hero in her book series.
- Daniel Radcliffe as Abigail Fairfax, an egotistical, eccentric billionaire who seeks to find the treasure of the Lost City.
- Da'Vine Joy Randolph as Beth Hatten, Loretta's publisher
- Brad Pitt as Jack Trainer, former Navy SEAL turned CIA operative
- Oscar Nunez as Oscar, an eccentric cargo plane pilot
- Patti Harrison as Allison, Loretta's social media manager
- Bowen Yang as Ray, the moderator for the book conference
- Stephen Lang as a fantasy villain in Loretta's book (Note: Stephen Lang was credited as "Slang" in the end credits.)
- Joan Pringle as Beth's grandmother
- Héctor Aníbal as Rafi, an island local who becomes one of Abigail's henchmen
- Thomas Forbes-Johnson as Julian, a brutish man who is one of Abigail's henchmen
- Sli Lewis as Shades, one of Abigail's henchmen
- Marcy Jarreau as Barb, an attendee of the book conference
- Raymond Lee as Officer Gomez
- Adam Nee as Officer Sawyer
- Ryan Judd as the voice of the PA Announcer
- Zach Steel as the voice of the Meditation Leader
- Clavel the Goat as Randy

== Production ==
In October 2020, it was announced Sandra Bullock would star in the film The Lost City of D, with Aaron and Adam Nee directing from a screenplay by Seth Gordon and Dana Fox, with Bullock serving as a producer under her Fortis Films banner, and Paramount Pictures to distribute. Bullock originally passed on the project because she felt the story was "outdated" due to it being in development for seven years. That December, Channing Tatum was cast as the male lead. Between March and April 2021, Patti Harrison, Da'Vine Joy Randolph, Daniel Radcliffe, Brad Pitt, and Oscar Nunez joined the cast, with Pitt and Yang appearing in cameo roles. Aaron and Adam Nee originally considered Keanu Reeves for the role of Jack Trainer, but he was too busy.

Principal photography began in May 2021 in the Dominican Republic, including Samaná, Santo Domingo, Casa de Campo, (Altos de Chavon) Monte Plata Province and Pinewood Dominican Republic Studios. It wrapped on August 16, 2021.

== Release ==
The Lost City premiered at the 2022 South by Southwest Film Festival on March 12. In October 2021, it was announced that The Lost City of D had been retitled The Lost City and that it would be theatrically released on March 25, 2022, after previously having been set for April 15, 2022. On March 1, 2022, the film's theatrical release in Russia (alongside Sonic the Hedgehog 2) was canceled in light of the country's invasion of Ukraine. The film became available to stream on Paramount+ on May 10, 2022. It was also released on EPIX on the same day as part of Paramount's pay-one window deal with the company. According to data from Samba TV, 1.5 million US households watched The Lost City in its first six days of streaming. It was released on Blu-ray, DVD, and Ultra HD Blu-ray on July 26 by Paramount Home Entertainment.

== Reception ==
=== Box office ===
The Lost City grossed $105.3 million in the United States and Canada, and $87.6 million in other territories, for a worldwide total of $192.9 million.

In the United States and Canada, the film was released alongside Infinite Storm and RRR and was projected to gross $20–34 million from 4,228 theaters in its opening weekend. The film grossed $11.5 million on its first day, including $2.5 million from Thursday preview screenings. It went on to debut to $30.5 million, displacing The Batman from atop the box office. Its debut was the second-largest for Paramount during the COVID-19 pandemic, behind A Quiet Place Part II. It also posted the highest opening weekend for an original film since the pandemic. In its second weekend, the film made $14.7 million for a fall of 52% and was placed second at the box office behind Morbius. It then made $9 million in its third weekend, finishing third. In the film's tenth weekend of release, it made $2.3 million, crossing the $100 million domestic mark in the process.

Outside the US and Canada, the film grossed $3.7 million from sixteen international markets in its opening weekend.

=== Critical response ===
On Rotten Tomatoes, the film has an approval rating of 78% based on 272 reviews, with an average rating of 6.4/10. The website's critical consensus reads, "The Lost City doesn't sparkle quite as brightly as some classic treasure-hunting capers, but its stars' screwball chemistry make this movie well worth romancing." On Metacritic, it has a weighted average score of 60 out of 100 based on 53 critics, indicating "mixed or average reviews". Audiences polled by CinemaScore gave the film an average grade of "B+" on an A+ to F scale, while those at PostTrak gave it an 81% positive score, with 61% saying they would definitely recommend it.

Manohla Dargis of The New York Times said "It's too bad that The Lost City isn't more ambitious, because a woman writing her dreams into reality is a potentially rich riff on the Pygmalion and Galatea myth ... While Raiders [of the Lost Ark] transcends its inspirations with wit and Steven Spielberg's filmmaking and Romancing [the Stone] tries hard to do the same, The Lost City remains a copy of a copy." Siddhant Adlakha of IGN giving film a 6 out of 10, calling it "a decent action-comedy that coasts on the presence of its stars".

Peter Debruge of Variety said, "The result can feel a little rickety in places, but the Nee brothers—who share screenplay credit with Oren Uziel and Dana Fox—have punched it up with off-color jokes, looped over moments when the characters' mouths are off-camera. In this and myriad other ways, The Lost City proves they do in fact make 'em like they used to." Writing for Rolling Stone, David Fear said "The movie itself is trying to excavate a long-lost genre: the big-budget action-adventure movie-star rom-com. It wants to be a modern Romancing the Stone so badly you can almost see the flop-sweat dripping down the screen."
