= Jane (2022 film) =

2022 film by Sabrina Jaglom

- Release poster
- Directed by: Sabrina Jaglom
- Written by: Sabrina Jaglom; Rishi Rajani
- Produced by: Madelaine Petsch; Debbie Liebling; Nick Phillips; Adam Wescott
- Starring: Madelaine Petsch; Chloe Bailey; Melissa Leo
- Cinematography: Diana Matos
- Edited by: Shelby Hall
- Music by: Anna Drubich
- Production companies: Creator+; Inner Child Productions; Dear Laine Productions
- Distributed by: Blue Fox Entertainment
- Release date: August 26, 2022
- Running time: 83 minutes
- Country: United States
- Language: English

Jane is a 2022 American psychological thriller film directed by Sabrina Jaglom and written by Jaglom and Rishi Rajani. The film stars Madelaine Petsch, Chloe Bailey, and Melissa Leo.

The film was released in select theaters in the United States on August 26, 2022, by Blue Fox Entertainment and via streaming on September 16, 2022, on Creator+.

== Plot ==
Ambitious high school senior Olivia Brooks struggles with grief from the recent loss of a friend. When she gets deferred from her dream college, she begins to spiral and experiences a series of increasingly frightening panic attacks. In an attempt to regain some sense of control, she embarks on a social media-fueled rampage against those who stand in the way of her success. But as things escalate, she is forced to confront and ultimately embrace her darkest impulses in order to get ahead.

== Cast ==
- Madelaine Petsch as Olivia Brooks
- Chloe Bailey as Isabelle "Izzy" Morris
- Chloe Yu as Jane
- Nina Bloomgarden as Camille
- Ian Owens as Mr. Richardson
- Kerri Medders as Josa Jacobs
- Victoria Foyt as Mrs. West
- Melissa Leo as Principal Rhodes

== Production ==
Jane was originally intended to be the first film made by Creator+, but another film Diamond in the Rough, starring Griffin Johnson,was chosen by the studio and released in June 2022.

Principal photography on the film began on August 2, 2021, in New Mexico. However, the production was suspended due to the COVID-19 pandemic. Filming later resumed and completed on August 23, 2021.
