= Terrestrial (film) =

2025 film by Steve Pink

- Directed by: Steve Pink
- Written by: Samuel Johnson; Connor Diedrich
- Produced by: Molly Gilula; Josh Jason; Molly Conners; AJ Bourscheid; Austin Lantero; Pauline Chalamet; Rachel Walden; Luca Balser
- Starring: Jermaine Fowler; James Morosini; Pauline Chalamet; Edy Modica; Rob Yang; Brendan Hunt; Craig Robinson; Rob Corddry
- Cinematography: Tom Hernquist
- Edited by: Neal Wynne
- Music by: James McAlister
- Production companies: Hurley/Pickle Productions; Phiphen; Range Media Partners; Gummy Films
- Distributed by: Aero Films
- Release dates: July 2025 (Fantasia); October 23, 2026
- Running time: 94 minutes
- Country: United States
- Language: English

Terrestrial is a 2026 thriller and dark comedy film, directed by Steve Pink and written by Samuel Johnson and Connor Diedrich.

== Plot ==
Three friends—Vic, Ryan, and Maddie—travel to the home of their longtime friend Allen Perkins in the Hollywood Hills. Allen, an aspiring science-fiction writer, welcomes them into his sprawling property, though his erratic behavior immediately creates unease. Next to the main house, there is a tarp-covered guesthouse that Allen says is under repair. Inside the house, the friends notice unsettling details, including broken glass and Allen’s fixation on a vintage Mustang he refuses to let anyone drive.

The group reconnects over drinks and conversation, reflecting on their shared past. Maddie announces her recent engagement to Ryan, while Allen appears increasingly preoccupied and emotionally volatile. Vic discovers a room in the house dedicated entirely to The Neptune Cycle, a science-fiction book series by celebrated author S.J. Purcell, whom Allen idolizes. Allen enthusiastically explains the mythology of the series, including an alien species known as the Voxti and their belief in hidden human potential.

At dinner, Allen discusses an ambitious new science-fiction novel he claims to be developing and hints at professional success that surprises his skeptical friends. However, his behavior grows increasingly unpredictable, veering between generosity, defensiveness, and emotional outbursts. When tensions surface among the group, Allen becomes unusually invested in their relationships, particularly Maddie’s.

As the visit continues, strange details begin to accumulate. Vic becomes suspicious of the covered guesthouse and discovers signs that Allen may be concealing financial and personal troubles. Allen’s obsession with S.J. Purcell and The Neptune Cycle also appears to run deeper than admiration, blurring the line between inspiration and fixation.

What begins as a weekend visit among friends gradually spirals into paranoia and escalating conflict, forcing the group to confront long-buried resentments, unrealized ambitions, and the consequences of obsession.

== Cast ==
- Jermaine Fowler as Allen
- James Morosini as Ryan
- Pauline Chalamet as Maddie
- Edy Modica as Vic
- Rob Yang as The Collector
- Brendan Hunt as S.J. Purcell
- Craig Robinson as Edos
- Rob Corddry as Captain Baldwin

== Release ==
The film first premiered at the Fantasia International Film Festival in 2025, winning the award for Best Screenplay. It was released in theaters in the US and Canada by Aero Films on October 23, 2026.

== Reception ==
On the review aggregator website Rotten Tomatoes, 74% of 35 critics' reviews are positive, with an average rating of 6.5/10.

Reviewer Dennis Harvey of Variety wrote, "A cheerfully macabre comedy of misunderstandings, lies and delusion, 'Terrestrial' teases with the promise of science-fiction — but it turns out the kind of fantasy at work here is less about outer space than the inner space of frantic reality-denial." Reviewer Sara Clements of nextbestpicture.com wrote, "What makes 'Terrestrial' so effective isn’t its sci-fi leanings but its commentary on idolatry, self-delusion, and the crushing pressure to appear successful, especially in a world obsessed with fame and image."

Reviewer Ken O'Shea of warped-perspective.com calledTerrestrial "an incredibly clever, ambitious project. [...] An exhilarating, tangled web of deception, double-crossing and questioning," while Jared Mobarak of thefilmstage.com wrote, "Terrestrial wears a pitch-black humor on its sleeve, a fact that won’t prepare you for how bleak the filmmakers are willing to run." However, Tim Grierson from Screen Daily said the film "sets up an intriguing premise ... [but] grows increasingly more convoluted once the revelations unfold, and its exploration of envy, unrequited love and the dangers of mistaking fantasy for real life quickly loses steam" and Maxance Vincent writing for In Session Film called it a "dull grab bag of underdeveloped ideas."
