= A Lot of Nothing =

- Directed by: Mo McRae
- Written by: Sarah Kelly Kaplan, Mo McRae
- Produced by: Inny Clemons; Zak Kristofek
- Starring: Y'lan Noel; Cleopatra Coleman; Justin Hartley
- Cinematography: John Rosario
- Edited by: Annie Eifrig
- Music by: David Sardy
- Production companies: Anonymous Content; Scalable Content; Secret Society Films; Traction
- Distributed by: RLJE Films
- Release dates: March 2022 (SXSW); February 3, 2023
- Running time: 104 minutes
- Country: USA
- Language: English

A Lot of Nothing is a satirical thriller focusing on the topics of racism and Police brutality in the United States. The film had its world premiere at the 2022 South by Southwest Film Festival. It received mixed reviews.

== Plot ==
After seeing their neighbor, police officer Brian (Justin Hartley), fatally shoot what they assume is an unarmed Black teenager on the news, affluent Black couple Vanessa (Cleopatra Coleman) and James (Y’lan Noel) are thrown into crisis—Vanessa angrily demands action, while James urges caution. Fuelled by frustration, Vanessa forcibly takes control: she grabs a gun, drags a reluctant James to confront Brian at his home, and when he refuses accountability, insists they abduct him. Back home, they bind him in their garage—Vanessa leading, James reluctantly following. The plan unravels when James’s brother Jamal (Shamier Anderson) and his pregnant fiancée Candy (Lex Scott Davis) arrive for dinner, unknowingly stepping into a hostage situation. As the tension mounts, ideologies clash—Vanessa presses Brian for remorse, James struggles between morality and fear, Jamal pushes for harsh justice, and Candy advocates empathy. Emotions boil over: Brian attempts escape, a shot rings out (nonfatal), and Candy unexpectedly goes into labor, highlighting the chaos they've created. A final spin arises when it's revealed the victim wasn't Black but white—shattering Vanessa’s assumptions and intensifying guilt. In the end, James shoots and kills Brian in a moment of unbearable moral collapse. No one is arrested. The film closes with the couple, broken and burdened, looking at their newborn nephew's photo—marking a harsh reckoning with justice, privilege, and the wreckage of their desperate choices.

== Cast ==
- Y'lan Noel as James
- Cleopatra Coleman as Vanessa
- Justin Hartley as Brian

== Reception ==
On Rotten Tomatoes the film has 48% score based on 25 reviews. On Metacritic, it has a score of 55 based on reviews from 9 critics, indicating "mixed or average" reviews.
