= Nika Turbina =

Russian poet (1974-2002)

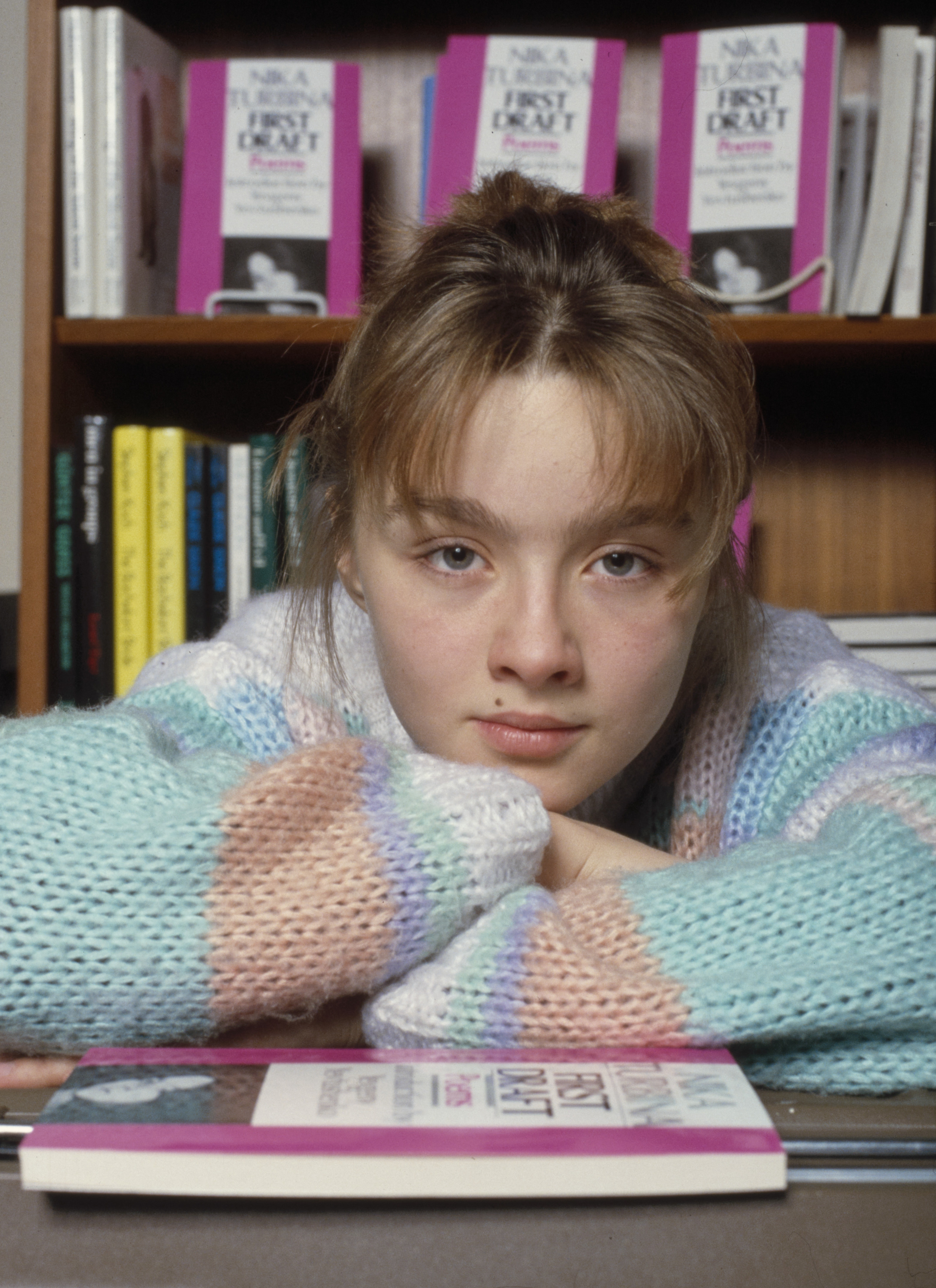
- Turbina in 1987
- Born: Nika Georgievna Turbina; 17 December 1974; Yalta, Crimea Oblast, Ukrainian Soviet Socialist Republic, Soviet Union
- Died: 11 May 2002 (aged 27); Moscow, Russia
- Resting place: Vagankovo Cemetery, Moscow, Russia
- Occupations: Poet, writer
- Years active: 1984-2002
- Notable work: First Draft (1984)
- Awards: Golden Lion for Venice Biennale (1985)

Nika Georgievna Turbina (Russian: Ника Гeopгиeвна Туpбина; 17 December 1974, Yalta – 11 May 2002, Moscow) was a Russian poet. She became famous for her profound and emotional poems which she wrote at an early age.

She wrote her first poem at the very young age of four and started writing poetry at the age of six and at the age of 10, her first poetry collection First Draft was published. She was awarded the Golden Lion for her poems in 1985. She wrote several poetry collections during her short career.

== Biography ==
=== Career ===
She started writing poetry at the age of 6 and published her first book in 1984, at the age of 10. A recording of her recitations sold over 30,000 copies in the then Soviet Union.

Turbina wrote her first complete poem aged four. Two years later, she was discovered by writer Yulian Semyonov who spent part of the year in her hometown of Yalta. Turbina's talent set her apart from her classmates in school, where she was learning ahead of her grade. She studied the piano and her favorite subject was mathematics, which she saw as akin to verses.

At the age of 10, Turbina published her first book, First Draft, with an introduction by Yevgeny Yevtushenko in 1984. Translations of her First Draft have been published in France, Italy and Britain.

=== Death ===
After years of alcohol abuse she died on 11 May 2002 in Moscow, Russia at the age of 27 after she fell from her 5th-floor window. Turbina was buried at Vagankovo Cemetery in Moscow.

=== Legacy ===
Turbina was the subject of the movie Nika, a biographical film by director Vasilisa Kuzmina starring Elizaveta Yankovskaya which had its world premiere at the 2022 South by Southwest festival.

== Books ==
- Quaderno di appunti, 1984.
- First Draft, 1988.
- Stupenʹki vverkh, stupenʹki vniz (Steps Upwards, Steps Downwards), 1991.
- Not To Forget, 2004.
- Sono pesi queste mie poesie, 2008.
- Nika Turbina, 2018.

== See also ==
- Nadya Rusheva
- Sasha Putrya
- Nika (film)
