= I Love My Dad =

2022 American film by James Morosini

- Theatrical release poster
- Directed by: James Morosini
- Written by: James Morosini
- Produced by: William Stertz; Sean King O'Grady; Sam Slater; Phil Keefe; Dane Eckerle; Daniel Brandt; Patton Oswalt
- Starring: Patton Oswalt; James Morosini; Claudia Sulewski; Rachel Dratch; Ricky Velez; Lil Rel Howery; Amy Landecker
- Cinematography: Steven Capitano Calitri
- Edited by: Josh Crockett
- Music by: Jeremy Bullock
- Production companies: Hantz Motion Pictures; Atlas Industries; Burn Later Productions; American High
- Distributed by: Magnolia Pictures
- Release dates: March 12, 2022 (SXSW); August 5, 2022 (United States)
- Running time: 95 minutes
- Country: United States
- Language: English
- Box office: $103,343

I Love My Dad is a 2022 American comedy film written and directed by James Morosini, inspired by actual events in his life. It stars Patton Oswalt, Morosini, and Claudia Sulewski. The film premiered at South by Southwest on March 12, 2022, and in theaters in the United States on August 5, 2022.

== Premise ==
After Franklin blocks his father Chuck on social media, Chuck "catfishes" his son by impersonating a waitress named Becca online. Chuck then agrees to drive Franklin to Maine to meet Becca, knowing that it might be the last straw in their father-son relationship.

== Cast ==
- Patton Oswalt as Chuck
- James Morosini as Franklin
- Claudia Sulewski as Becca
- Rachel Dratch as Erica
- Ricky Velez as Derek
- Lil Rel Howery as Jimmy
- Amy Landecker as Diane

== Production ==
Principal photography took place in Syracuse, New York. Filming wrapped in June 2021.

== Release ==
The film premiered at the 2022 South by Southwest Film Festival on March 12. In April 2022, Magnolia Pictures acquired North American rights to the film. It was released in theaters on August 5, 2022, and on demand on August 12, 2022.

== Reception ==
=== Critical response ===
On the review aggregator website Rotten Tomatoes, 72% of 89 critics' reviews are positive, with an average rating of 6.5/10. The website's consensus reads: "I Love My Dad may take its cringe comedy too far for some viewers, but Patton Oswalt's fearless performance keeps the story anchored in honest emotion." Metacritic, which uses a weighted average, assigned the film a score of 58 out of 100, based on 24 critics, indicating "mixed or average" reviews.

Todd McCarthy at Deadline Hollywood praised Oswalt's performance, Morosini's screenplay, and the use of social media to refine the show, don't tell technique. The Hollywood Reporter's John DeFore gave positive notes to Morosini's direction and called it "a surprisingly gentle take on a potentially explosive premise." Nick Allen at RogerEbert.com gave it a 3.5/4 and praised Sulewski as the movie's "comic MVP", adding that she "plays into both 'Becca' exaggerations so thoughtfully, that by the third act her actual Becca has a special poignancy and agency." David Ehrlich at IndieWire gave it a B−, praising Morosini for "keeping the perversity of it all intact" and Sulewski's performance to be "elastic", while adding that it would have "been a more satisfying experience had it swerved away from decency and good taste even harder than it already does[...]"

=== Accolades ===
At the South by Southwest film festival, the film won the Jury and Audience Awards in the Narrative Feature Competition.
