= Claudia Sulewski =

American YouTuber (born 1996)

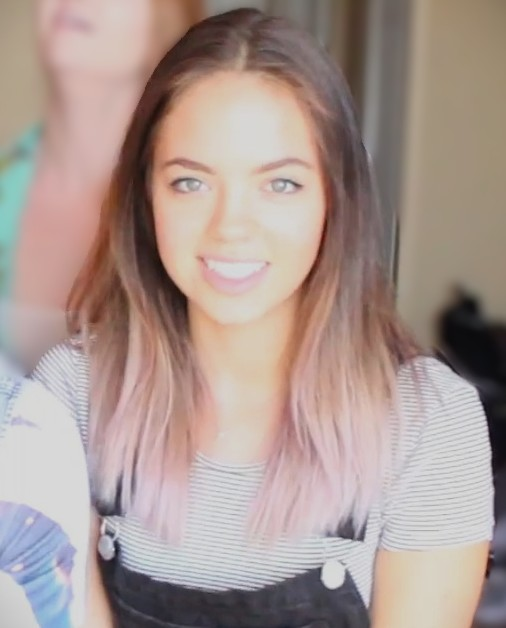
- Sulewski in 2025
- Born: February 19, 1996 (age 30); Chicago, Illinois, U.S.
- Occupations: YouTuber; host; actress
- Years active: 2007–present
- Known for: YouTube
- Spouse: Finneas O'Connell (m. 2026)

YouTube information
- Channel: ClaudiaSulewski
- Subscribers: 2.44 million
- Views: 154.39 million
- Last updated: March 25, 2026

Claudia Sulewski O'Connell (née Sulewski; born February 19, 1996) is an American YouTuber, host, and actress. In 2007, she started making videos on her YouTube channel in her hometown of Chicago, before moving to Los Angeles in 2014, where she jumped into hosting. A year later, she began hosting videos for Teen Vogue's YouTube channel, becoming its regular host. She has continued on to an acting career, debuting in the 2022 film I Love My Dad.

In 2023, Sulewski launched the body care brand Cyklar.

== Early life ==
Sulewski was born on February 19, 1996 in Chicago, Illinois, to Polish parents Beata Krupińska Sulewska and Czesław Sulewski. She was raised in Park Ridge, a suburb of Chicago. She has two brothers.

== Career ==
=== YouTube and hosting ===
She started her YouTube channel in 2007 with the name BeyondBeautyStar, and used the same name on Instagram. Her channel consists of videos about her fashion choices, beauty routines, travels, interior design endeavors, workouts, daily life, and wellness; she has since changed her channel's display name to her full name, 'Claudia Sulewski', as well as all her accounts across social media.

During the COVID-19 pandemic lockdowns, Sulewski and her boyfriend, musician Finneas O'Connell, started the podcast We Bought A House. Soon after, they stopped doing the podcast, O'Connell citing that they felt like they were "sharing too much."

=== Business ventures ===
She has also ventured into fashion by collaborating with Nordstrom BP to create a clothing line for which she acted as the social media creative director, crafting the advertisements and producing her own lookbook for the launch.

Sulewski founded the sustainable body care brand Cyklar in October 2023.

=== Acting and directing ===
From 2016 to 2017, she appeared in the TV series The Commute, and from 2016 to 2018, in the webseries T@gged. In 2019, she appeared in an episode of Marvel's Runaways.

She made her wide-release feature film debut in the 2022 movie I Love My Dad, co-starring James Morosini, who also writes and directs, and Patton Oswalt. The film premiered at South by Southwest on March 12, winning the Jury and Audience Awards in the Narrative Film Competition. In July 2022, Sulewski directed, filmed, and edited the music video of O'Connell's song, "Mona Lisa, Mona Lisa." The music video was filmed on iPhone and a handycam in Paris, France. In May 2025, Sulewski directed the music video of O'Connell's song, "2001."

== Personal life ==
Since September 2018, Sulewski has been in a relationship with musician Finneas O'Connell. Sulewski has since become an inspiration for O'Connell's music, such as in songs "Claudia" and "Mona Lisa, Mona Lisa", the former for which she painted the cover art, and the latter for which she directed the music video. On September 24, 2025, the couple announced their engagement on social media. The two wed on August 29, 2026.

== Filmography ==
=== Television and webseries ===
Year	Title	Role	Notes	Ref.
2014	Young Hollywood	Herself		
2015	Teen Vogue Youtube Host: Claudia Sulewski	Herself		
2015	A Christmas Carol + Zombies	Scrooge	TV Short	
2016–2017	The Commute	Emma	Main role	
2017	Betch	Herself/Mallory	Episode: "A Claudia Sulewski Sketch Show"	
2017	Embeds	Katie	Episode: "Off The Record"	
2017	Hyperlinked	Phoebe	Episode: "R.I.P. Computer"	
2017	Versus	Skylar	Main role	
2016–2018	T@gged	Nicki Sullivan	Web series; main role	
2019	Runaways	Julie	Episode: "Cheat the Gallows"	
2024–2026	Shrinking	Ava	Recurring role	

=== Film ===
Year	Title	Role	Notes	Ref.
2019	Deadcon	Megan		
2021	Billie Eilish: The World's a Little Blurry	Herself	Documentary	
2022	I Love My Dad	Becca	Wide release feature film debut	

=== Music video ===
Year	Title	Artist	Notes	Ref.
2019	"Are You Bored Yet?"	Wallows featuring Clairo		
2022	"Mona Lisa, Mona Lisa"	Finneas	Also directed and edited	
2024	"For Cryin' Out Loud!"	Finneas		
2024	"Lotus Eater"	Finneas		
2025	"2001"	Finneas	Directed	
2025	"David's Brother"	The Favors	Directed	
