= It's What's Inside =

2024 film by Greg Jardin

- Release poster
- Directed by: Greg Jardin
- Written by: Greg Jardin
- Produced by: William Rosenfeld; Kate Andrews; Jason Baum; Raúl Domingo
- Starring: Brittany O'Grady; James Morosini; Gavin Leatherwood; Nina Bloomgarden; Alycia Debnam-Carey; Reina Hardesty; Devon Terrell; David Thompson; Madison Davenport
- Cinematography: Kevin Fletcher
- Edited by: Greg Jardin
- Music by: Andrew Hewitt
- Production companies: Such Content; Edith Productions; Boldly Go Productions
- Distributed by: Netflix
- Release dates: January 19, 2024 (Sundance); October 4, 2024 (Netflix)
- Running time: 103 minutes
- Country: United States
- Language: English
- Budget: $2.5 million

It's What's Inside is a 2024 American science fiction comedy horror film, written and directed by Greg Jardin. It stars Brittany O'Grady, James Morosini, Gavin Leatherwood, Nina Bloomgarden, Alycia Debnam-Carey, Reina Hardesty, Devon Terrell, David Thompson, and Madison Davenport as a group of college friends who reunite for a party eight years after they were last together, only for the night to spin increasingly out of control after one of them offers to play a game involving body swaps.

The film had its world premiere at the Sundance Film Festival on January 19, 2024, and was released worldwide on Netflix on October 4. It received generally positive reviews from critics.

== Plot ==
Couple Shelby and Cyrus and their friends Dennis, Nikki, Brooke, and Maya gather at Reuben's family home for a party before his wedding. Also due to attend is their mutual friend Forbes, whom they have not seen since a party in college for which he got expelled for bringing his high school student sister Beatrice. Beatrice, obsessed with Dennis, was admitted to a mental facility after having a breakdown due to Dennis dismissing her for Nikki.

Forbes arrives at the party, carrying a suitcase. Inside the case is a device that allows them to swap bodies with one another. Forbes explains that he and his colleagues would use it to play a game similar to Mafia, during which players have to guess who is in their bodies. After doing a short demonstration on the group, they all eventually agree to participate, taking Polaroid photos for identification.

When round one begins, the group incorrectly guesses that Cyrus is in Dennis's body, when he is actually in Reuben's. To Cyrus's surprise, Forbes, who is the one in Dennis's body, plays along with the lie, pretending to be Cyrus. Deciding to play along himself, Cyrus encounters Maya, who is in Nikki's body, and the two kiss. However, Cyrus cuts himself on a chair and the person in Maya's body interrupts them, causing Maya to become suspicious and leave. Cyrus later encounters Shelby in Brooke's body and Reuben in Cyrus's body, where they are making fun of Cyrus's reluctance to dance and porn watching habits. After round one ends, all but Cyrus sing the game's praises. Dennis apologizes to Forbes for having told on him to the dean with Reuben after the party, causing him to get expelled. Forbes accepts the apology but seems to be taken aback at Reuben's involvement.

Unnerved, Cyrus declines to take part in round two and gets in an argument with Dennis. Cyrus complains to Shelby about him and accuses her of letting things go too easily, at which she takes offense. Forbes explains this will be the last round before the machine takes 24 hours to recharge. Eventually, Cyrus relents after the initially timid Shelby eagerly agrees to take part, but they devise a tell so that they know whose bodies each other is in. When the round begins, Shelby swaps into Nikki's body and is quickly enamored by her good looks and successful social media career. Cyrus, who is in Forbes's body, finds Shelby, where they start to have sex before he panics and demands they end the game. Meanwhile, Reuben in Dennis's body and Brooke in Maya's body begin having sex on the balcony before the balcony collapses beneath them, causing them to fall to their deaths right as the group gathers to end the round beneath them.

Arguing over what to do, Forbes refuses to let the group call the police and let the device go into their custody. Dennis, furious at the suggestion he has to swap into Reuben's body, argues with Cyrus and reveals Cyrus only settled for Shelby as he could not date Nikki. Dennis calls the police, claiming that Cyrus killed Dennis and Maya. Forbes attempts to flee with the device but is subdued by Nikki. Shelby refuses to swap back and leave Nikki's body.

Cyrus tries to make amends with Shelby, but Maya tells Shelby that Cyrus kissed her during the first round of the game while he was pretending to be Forbes and she was in Nikki's body. Forbes awakens, and Nikki tries to convince him to make the swap. Shelby appears, threatening to ruin Nikki's career with a damaging video. Shelby proposes that if Cyrus wants Nikki then she can stay in Nikki's body, and he can go into Reuben's body, while Dennis, in Cyrus's body, takes the fall for the deaths. Nikki allies with Forbes to swap back into their original bodies and makes Shelby have an allergic reaction to peanut butter, refusing to give over the EpiPen unless Forbes sets the wiring. Dennis discovers money from his trust fund has been transferred into an offshore account and accuses Cyrus. The police enter the house as the group sets off the device.

The next day, Beatrice arrives at the house to discover the wedding has been called off. Seeing Dennis in Forbes's body, she reveals that she is the real Forbes, and that Beatrice had swapped bodies with him to enact revenge on Dennis and Nikki. In the aftermath, Maya is in Brooke's body, Shelby and an imprisoned Cyrus have returned to their bodies, Nikki is in Reuben's body, while Beatrice, now in Nikki's body, escapes with Dennis's money and the device.

== Cast ==
- Brittany O'Grady as Shelby
- James Morosini as Cyrus, Shelby's boyfriend
- Gavin Leatherwood as Dennis
- Nina Bloomgarden as Maya
- Alycia Debnam-Carey as Nikki, an online influencer
- Reina Hardesty as Brooke
- Devon Terrell as Reuben, Cyrus and Shelby's friend
- David Thompson as Forbes Blomquist
- Madison Davenport as Beatrice Blomquist, Forbes's younger sister

== Production ==
In November 2022, Deadline Hollywood reported that the independent film completed production, after filming for 18 days in Portland, Oregon. Greg Jardin directed and wrote the screenplay. Brittany O'Grady, James Morosini, Alycia Debnam-Carey, Devon Terrell, Gavin Leatherwood, Reina Hardesty, Nina Bloomgarden, David Thompson, and Madison Davenport rounded out the cast. The film was a co-production between Such Content, Edith Productions, and Boldly Go Productions. It was produced by William Rosenfeld, Kate Andrews, Jason Baum, and Raùl Domingo. Colman Domingo and Robert Kapp were the two lead executive producers. Andrew Hewitt composed the score for the film.

== Release ==
It's What's Inside had its world premiere in the Midnight section at the Sundance Film Festival on January 19, 2024. Shortly after, Netflix acquired worldwide distribution rights to the film for $17 million in the largest deal made at that edition of the festival. It also screened at South by Southwest on March 15, 2024. The film was released on Netflix on October 4, 2024.

== Reception ==
On the review aggregator website Rotten Tomatoes, 79% of 77 critics' reviews are positive, with an average rating of 7.3/10. The website's consensus reads: "Cleverly constructed and leaping off the screen with stylistic verve, It's What's Inside centers around a party from hell that audiences can enjoy from a safe remove." Metacritic, which uses a weighted average, assigned the film a score of 57 out of 100, based on 22 critics, indicating "mixed or average" reviews.

John Nugent of Empire called It's What's Inside "a fun and stylish rethink of body-swap movies". He stated that "Jardin's emphasis on style and verve can feel excessive at times, but for this particular story it doesn't actually seem out of place. Its excess is the animating engine of the film: a story about the superficiality of the modern world, and the masks we put on. While it's admittedly not always easy keeping track of who is wearing which body-swapped mask — Jardin sometimes gives us a stylized, red-lit glimpse behind the curtain of who's who — it is an undeniably compelling, frequently surprising, deeply trippy trip."

In a positive review, Johnny Oleksinski of the New York Post called the film "smart sci-fi that keeps you guessing", stating: "Jardin's concept is a devilishly clever one. The millennial generation has grown up obsessed with how they are perceived — online and in-person — and adopting totally new faces with anonymity unleashes their inner animals. [...] If only his satire included more memorable characters. Whereas the similarly eerie millennial send-up Search Party took vicious aim at recognizable tropes, this pack makes an impression as a tight ensemble rather than as compelling individuals. This is partly why when one reveler ends up in the body of another, it can be confusing to keep track of who's who at any given time. Perhaps Jardin means for the viewer to be as mixed up as the participants, but the tension went slack whenever I had to piece a complex puzzle together." He rated the film two and a half stars out of four.

In a mixed review, Ronak Kotecha of The Times of India wrote, "The film's biggest flaw is that it attempts to juggle two overdone concepts—body swapping and the gathering of old friends in a single location—without offering anything new or compelling. Ironically, the story's theme of revealing one's true self through the swapping process feels underexplored. It veers between being overly simplistic and needlessly chaotic, often sidelining the supporting characters to focus more on the central couple, leaving the rest of the ensemble cast feeling underutilized." He praised the production values and performances, but felt that "The potential for a more engaging story was there, but it's overshadowed by a lack of depth and consistency in the character arcs... The film leaves a mixed impression—ambitious but lacking the execution needed to truly stand out in its genre."

=== Accolades ===
Award	Date of ceremony	Category	Nominee(s)	Result	Ref.
Critics Choice Awards	February 7, 2025	Best Movie Made for Television	It's What's Inside	Nominated	
