= Aaron and Adam Nee =

American filmmakers

Aaron and Adam Nee, sometimes referred to as the Nee brothers, are an American filmmaking duo best known for their feature films The Last Romantic (2006), Band of Robbers (2015), and The Lost City (2022).

== Collaborative history ==
Although the brothers work separately at times – Adam acts and writes solo or with other writing partners, and Aaron directs documentary projects and commercials – their collaboration on short and feature films, music videos for bands including A Fine Frenzy and Terrene, garnered them recognition as a filmmaking team. Their feature film The Last Romantic made Aaron and Adam Nee the winners of the Emerging Filmmakers Award at the 29th Starz Denver Film Festival. The festival described it as: "Ambitious in its narrative and visual aesthetics, this film is also the rare work by a first-time filmmaker that is both very funny and very smart," and "buoyed by an impressive and charming central performance as well as an eccentric and hilarious supporting cast."

They were also featured in Filmmaker's "25 New Faces of Independent Film 2006".

An earlier collaborative work of Aaron and Adam Nee was the music of ru(ok). Both brothers still create music separately, and Aaron scores many of the projects he has produced.

In April 2018, it was announced that Aaron and Adam Nee would be directing a reboot of Masters of the Universe. The duo would also be co-writing the screenplay with David Callaham. The film was set to be released on Netflix, with production set to begin in 2023. On July 18, 2023, it was announced that Netflix has canceled the film but Mattel Films was looking for a new studio to buy the project. Aaron and Adam Nee went on to direct a Lego film instead. On May 1, 2024 it was confirmed that the Masters of the Universe film would be released on June 5, 2026 by Amazon MGM Studios and Mattel Films with Travis Knight directing and Chris Butler would write the screenplay based on initial drafts written by Aaron and Adam Nee and David Callaham.

=== Aaron Nee ===
Aaron Nee, the elder Nee brother, attended the University of Central Florida. Aaron's work as a cinematographer in their debut feature has been called some of the most beautiful DV cinematography in independent film to date. His documentary following convicts released from prison and their journey to rehabilitation and transformation was released at the end of 2008.

Aaron also does motion graphics and visual effects through his company G.R.O.W. LLC.

=== Adam Nee ===
The younger Nee brother moved to New York City as a young adult to pursue acting, which entailed day work on such television projects as Law & Order and Sex and the City. Adam starred in the 2006 film The Last Romantic, Able Danger, and South of Heaven, in which he acted alongside Aaron, playing brothers Roy and Dale Coop. He currently resides in Los Angeles. He was formerly married to actress Allison Miller.

== Filmography ==
| Year | Title | Directors | Writers | Producers | Editors | Notes |
|---|---|---|---|---|---|---|
| 2006 | The Last Romantic | Yes | Yes | No | No | Also cinematographer (Aaron only) |
| 2009 | Clark Kent Has a Dream | Yes | Yes | Adam Nee | Yes | TV series |
| 2015 | Band of Robbers | Yes | Yes | No | Yes | |
| 2016 | You Can Never Really Know Someone | Yes | Yes | Adam Nee | No | Short film |
| 2022 | The Lost City | Yes | Yes | No | No | |
| 2026 | Masters of the Universe | No | Yes | No | No | |

Additional literary material

- A Minecraft Movie (2025)

Aaron Nee only

| Year | Title | Director | Writer | Producer | Editor | DoP | Notes |
|---|---|---|---|---|---|---|---|
| 2009 | Return | Yes | Yes | Yes | Yes | Yes | Documentary film |

== The Last Romantic ==
The Last Romantic, starring Adam Nee, James Urbaniak and Shalom Harlow, which was shot on DV for under $20,000, opened at the SXSW film festival. The film was selected to play in The New York Times' and Emerging Pictures' "Undiscovered Gems of 2006", a series of films highlighting some of the best undistributed films of the past year. The film has been labeled as belonging to the Mumblecore movement, although others have argued that its cinematography, story, and use of professional actors excludes it from such a grouping.
