= Toby Amies =

English filmmaker and broadcaster

- Born: Tobias Amies; 27 June 1967 (age 59); Birmingham, Warwickshire
- Occupations: Film director, broadcaster, and photographer
- Notable work: The Man Whose Mind Exploded

Toby Amies is a filmmaker and broadcaster who specialises in making programmes about art, music, and travel with an emphasis on fringe culture and alternative perspectives. He is best known for his feature-length documentary The Man Whose Mind Exploded and his broadcast work on BBC Radio 4, MTV Europes's Alternative Nation, FilmFour, Lonely Planet Six Degrees and The Rough Guides. In addition, Amies is a widely published portrait photographer and writer.

== Early life and education ==
Amies was brought up in Worcestershire and went to the University of Exeter in Devon and subsequently the University of Kansas, where he was awarded a scholarship in Art History. He declined the scholarship in favour of work in music TV in the UK at the Powerstation.

== Career ==
Amies began his career on air with Chris Evans, Boy George, Steven Wells and Suggs. He started DJing in art college in Cheltenham (he was in the same class as British artist Tim Noble) and after leaving the UK he worked behind the decks in Arizona at top 40 radio station KRQ alongside Jimmy Kimmel. He later worked at MCA Records in Los Angeles and then moved to work in the news department at MTV Europe partly thanks to work/appearances with Quentin Tarantino and Traci Lords at MCA before moving to MTV.

Whilst at MTV Europe he worked on the programmes Alternative Nation, US Top 20, Weekend Edition, The Big Picture and was the co-creator of the programme MTV Hot which later featured Paul Tonkinson, Sara Cox and the German actor Christian Ulmen as hosts. He also worked alongside Davina McCall.

Amies later moved to MTV USA to host MTV Live with Carson Daly. This show later became TRL. He also hosted his own show, Countdown to the Ten Spot. In 1999, he moved on to form the band Genius Steals with New York City photographer Brooke Williams, working with Moby, Romanthony, Darry Logan, Jim Sclavunos and Matt Verta-Ray amongst others. At this time he also hosted the anarchic US Top 20, most famous for the show that attempted to measure the length of Long Island.

Since moving back to the UK he has covered film festivals for FilmFour, worked for Radio 4 and became the host of three series of Lonely Planet Six Degrees and two series of The Rough Guides. In the Lonely Planet series, he teamed up with fellow British presenter Asha Gill to visit many countries. Amies presented programmes on Radio 4, BBC Two, BBC Four and BBC World Service. He occasionally podcasts on podomatic.

He concentrates on filmmaking, regularly making films for Nowness, the Tate, Christie's and music videos.

In 2022 Amies released the documentary In The Court of the Crimson King: King Crimson at 50 (formerly titled Cosmic FuKc) about progressive rock band King Crimson, to coincide with the group's 50th anniversary.
