= Nika (film) =

- Theatrical release poster
- Directed by: Vasilisa Kuzmina
- Written by: Vasilisa Kuzmina; Yulia Gulyan
- Produced by: Mikhail Vrubel; Aleksandr Andryushchenko; Fyodor Bondarchuk; Denis Baglay; Vadim Vereshchagin; Vyacheslav Murugov
- Starring: Elizaveta Yankovskaya; Anna Mikhalkova; Ivan Fominov; Ivan Brovin; Vitaliya Korniyenko
- Cinematography: Mikhail Milashin
- Music by: Amin Bouhafa
- Production companies: National Media Group; Vodorod Film Company; Art Pictures Studio
- Distributed by: Central Partnership
- Release date: 19 May 2022
- Country: Russia
- Language: Russian

Nika (Russian: Ника) is a 2022 Russian biographical drama film written and directed by Vasilisa Kuzmina, The film is based on real events in the lives of the Soviet poet Nika Turbina (performed by Elizaveta Yankovskaya), and her mother (played by Anna Mikhalkova).

It was theatrically released in Russia on 19 May 2022, by Central Partnership.

== Plot ==
As a child, Nika Turbina, together with her mother, toured the Soviet Union. Nika's life turned out to be short, but full of dramatic events. Having become famous throughout the USSR for the poems that came to her in dreams and were recorded by her mother, the girl spent her entire childhood on tour around the country, being interviewed, attending bohemian parties, and having meetings with celebrities. Readers were struck by her childish sadness and the poignancy of her verses.

But the end of the 1990s are dawning, and 27-year-old Nika has not been writing for a long time, inspiration has left her. Its place has been taken over by alcohol and attempts to understand herself. Where did her “voice” and motherly love disappear to? Can she be happy? A meeting with a cheerful and independent Ivan, who abandoned the career of a diplomat, gives hope to the girl.

== Cast ==
- Elizaveta Yankovskaya as Nika Turbina
  - Vitaliya Korniyenko as young Nika
- Anna Mikhalkova as Maya Nikanorkina, Nika's mother
- Ivan Fominov as Ivan
- Ivan Brovin as Roma
- Egor Trukhin as Yasha
- Yevgeny Sangadzhiev as Igor
- Ivan Makarevich as Larik
- Nikolay Denisov as Yevgeny Yevtushenko

== Production ==
Principal photography took place in Moscow and on the Russian Black Sea coast.
