= Vasilisa Kuzmina =

Russian filmmaker and actress

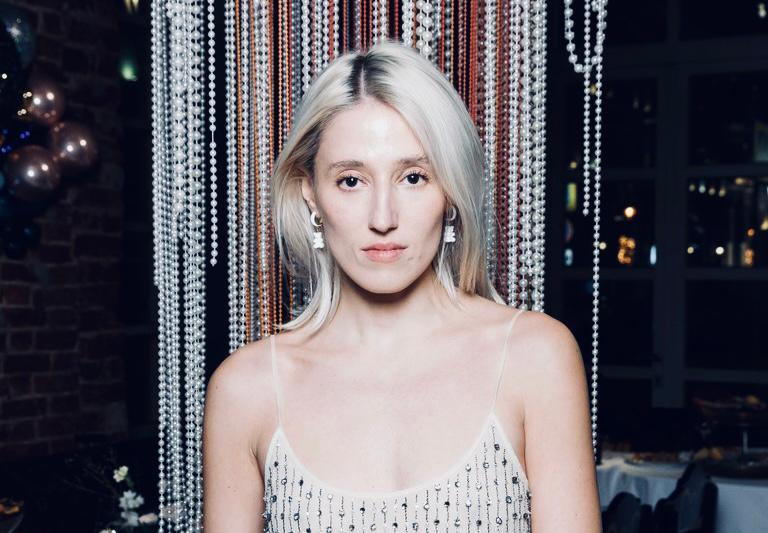
- Born: Vasilisa Vasilievna Kuzmina; 29 November 1991 (age 34); Moscow, Russia
- Occupations: filmmaker, screenwriter and actress

Vasilisa Vasilievna Kuzmina (Russian: Василиса Васильевна Кузьмина; born on 29 November 1991 in Moscow, Russia) is a filmmaker, screenwriter and actress.

== Early life ==
Vasilisa born on 29 November 1991 in Moscow, Russia. She graduated from Economics Faculty of MGIMO University and Columbia University (New York).

In 2017, she finished The Mikhail Shchepkin Higher Theater School (Dragunov's studio). Also, she is the graduate of Fyodor Bondarchuk's Industry Movie and Television school.

== Career ==
In 2017 Vasilisa Kuzmina played the leading role in the film Muse, for which she was awarded an International Film Festival for Peace, Inspiration, and Equality award. She took part in the Monaco International Film Festival as a jury member the same year.

In 2018 her first student's project, the short film Free That Guy, led Vasilisa to the Best Film Award at the Los Angeles Film Awards. The film Alisa became her debut filmmaking work, which was filmed as a part of national screenwriters competition announced by Yandex Medialab. Vasilisa became the winner and achieved a chance to put the movie script into reality with Timur Bekmambetov and his Bazelevs Film Company. Later on, Alisa became a nominee of a number of festivals, among which are: Women Media Arts and Film (2021, Sydney, Australia); Seoul international Extreme-Short Image Film Festival (2019, Seol, Korea); Hong Kong PUFF Film Festival (2020, Hong Kong, China).

In 2020 Vasilisa together with Ivan Petukhov released 5-series sequel for the short movie. «Alisa» mini series was included in the pilot episodes competition program of the South by Southwest (SXSW) — the biggest American festival.The series premiere took place there as well.

Kuzmina directed the 2022 biographical drama Nika, which was about the Soviet poet Nika Turbina. Elizaveta Yankovskaya, Anna Mikhalkova and Vitaliya Korniyenko played the leading roles. Nika was enlisted in the South by Southwest film festival program, where it won a special prize for breakthrough. By the special prize SXSW remarked Elizaveta Yankovskaya's acting job.

== Awards and nominations ==
Year	Award	Nomination	Result	Source
2017	International Film Festival for Peace, Inspiration, and Equality	For the best movie	Won	
2018	Los Angeles Film Awards	For the best movie	Won	
2021	22D Music Award	Nika	Won	

== Filmography ==
=== Roles in movies ===
- 2017 — Muse — Muse
- 2017 — Fleabag — Alina
- 2018 — Two Solitudes — shop assistant
- 2018 — Free That Guy — girl

=== Directing ===
- 2018 — Alice AI — Director
- 2018 — Free that guy — Director
- 2020 — Alisa — Director
- 2022 — Besit (3 and 5 series) — Director
- 2022 — Nika — Director
