= James Morosini =

American actor and filmmaker

- Born: James Charles Morosini; 1989 or 1990 (age 36–37); Tampa Bay, Florida, U.S.
- Education: University of Southern California
- Occupations: Actor; director; screenwriter
- Years active: 2013–present
- Relatives: Dana Reeve (aunt)

James Morosini (born 1989 or 1990) is an American actor and filmmaker.

== Early life and career ==
Morosini was born and raised in Tampa, Florida, the son of Deborah Morosini and Claudio Lichtenthal, a ski instructor. His father is a Jewish emigrant from Argentina. His maternal aunt was actress Dana Reeve. He earned a bachelor's degree from the USC School of Cinematic Arts.

In 2022, Morosini wrote, directed and starred in I Love My Dad, which he based on his own experiences. He starred in It's What's Inside, which premiered at the 2024 Sundance Film Festival. In July 2024, it was announced that Morosini had written and would direct the psychological horror film, Mommy's Home for Lionsgate Films. He would later be replaced by David F. Sandberg as director.

== Filmography ==
=== Film ===
Year	Title	Role	Notes
2013	The Hands You Shake	Mason	
2015	Textbook Adulthood	Reggie	
2018	Threesomething	Isaac	Also writer and director
2022	I Love My Dad	Franklin	Also writer and director
2024	It's What's Inside	Cyrus	
2025	Terrestrial	Ryan	Competed in 29th Fantasia International Film Festival in Cheval Noir.

=== Television ===
Year	Title	Role	Notes
2013	Hart of Dixie	Jason	Episode: "Why Don't We Get Drunk?"
2014	Sex Sent Me to the ER	Frank	Episode: "Game Over"
2015	Criminal Minds	David Whitfield	Episode: "Awake"
2016	NAMCAR Night Race	Manny	Episode: "Pilot"
2016	Single Minded	James	3 episodes
2016	Typical Rick	Door Guy	Episode: "Up in the Club"
2016	Crazy Ex-Girlfriend	Guy	Episode: "Why Is Josh's Ex-Girlfriend Eating Carbs?"
2016	The Great Indoors	Dixon	Episode: "No Bad Ideas"
2016	American Horror Story: Roanoke	Bob Kinnaman	1 episodes
2017	American Horror Story: Cult	R.J.	2 episodes
2016–2018	Loosely Exactly Nicole	Chaz	5 episodes
2017	Son of Zorn	Eli	Episode: "All Hail Son of Zorn"
2017	Feud	Bart	Episode: "Hagsploitation"
2018	Lethal Weapon	Tyler Thatcher	Episode: "Jesse's Girl"
2018	Daddy Issues	Elija	Television film
2018	Foursome	Hugh	10 episodes
2021	The Sex Lives of College Girls	Dalton	6 episodes
