= The Man Whose Mind Exploded =

- Film poster
- Directed by: Toby Amies
- Produced by: Toby Amies; Rob Alexander; Kat Mansoor
- Starring: Drako Oho Zarharzar; Toby Amies
- Cinematography: Toby Amies
- Edited by: Jim Scott
- Production company: Succulent Pictures
- Distributed by: Dogwoof Pictures
- Release date: June 2013 (Sheffield Doc/Fest)
- Language: English

The Man Whose Mind Exploded is a 2013 documentary film directed by Toby Amies. The film depicts the strange relationship between Amies and Brighton eccentric Drako Oho Zarharzar.

== Synopsis ==
Drako Oho Zarharzar can remember modeling for Salvador Dalí and hanging out with The Stones. But he can't remember yesterday. Following a severe head injury, Drako has suffered brain damage and anterograde amnesia - memory loss . He can access memories from before his accident, but can't imprint new ones. As he puts it, "the recording machine in my head doesn't work". As an antidote to depression he chose to live "completely in the now" according to the mottoes delivered to him whilst in his second coma. A flat filled with a collage of memories, reminders and erotic art, Drako's house acts as a metaphor for his extraordinary mind.

Filmed over four years, the director starts off making a film exploring Drako's lurid and exotic back story including work with Dalí, [the Factory], Les Folies Bergère, and Derek Jarman. But he is forced to stay in Drako's neverending now and soon a line is crossed, and the documentary maker becomes caretaker.

== Production ==
The Man Whose Mind Exploded started life as a BBC Radio 4 programme described by Miranda Sawyer in The Observer as "the best documentary of 2008". The reception to it was so positive that the director was encouraged to turn it into a film. The film was produced by Rob Alexander, Kat Mansoor, and Toby Amies. Executive producers were Daisy Asquith and Dunstan Bruce while the editing was done by Jim Scott.

The film music was composed by Adam Peters, who made his debut as a solo movie score composer on Savages (2012) directed by Oliver Stone.

== Release ==
The Man Whose Mind Exploded premiered at the Sheffield Doc/Fest and was pitched in the 2008 MeetMarket. It was also shown at the Cork Film Festival, Revelation Perth International Film Festival, Cambridge Film Festival, Brighton's Cinecity Festival, and was an official selection at the East End Film Festival.

== Reception ==
The Man Whose Mind Exploded gained 4 star reviews from The Times, The Guardian, Time Out and The Independent in the UK.
