= The Pez Outlaw =

2022 documentary film by Amy and Bryan Storkel

- Directed by: Amy Storkel; Bryan Storkel
- Produced by: Amy Bandlien Storkel; Bryan Storkel
- Starring: Steven J. Glew; Katie Chrzanowski; Jon Hicks; Eric Leukert; Jim Blaine
- Cinematography: Britton Foster
- Edited by: Amy Storkel; Bryan Storkel; Evan Vetter
- Music by: Michael James Lee
- Distributed by: Gravitas Ventures
- Release date: 2022
- Running time: 85 minutes
- Country: United States
- Language: English

The Pez Outlaw is a documentary about a man who smuggled valuable Pez dispensers to the United States from Eastern Europe. It was directed, edited and produced by Amy Storkel and Bryan Storkel and it began streaming on Netflix in the United States on January 19, 2023.

== Plot ==
The film follows Steven J. Glew, an idiosyncratic resident of DeWitt, Michigan. During the 1990s, he smuggled Pez dispensers into the USA from Eastern Europe and made millions of dollars and butted heads with a Pez USA executive called the "Pezident" who controlled what dispensers came into the US. Many dispensers were made by Pez International and did not enter the American market, and American Pez collectors were willing to pay high prices for European dispensers.

Glew, in a series of trips to European Pez factories, purchased millions of dispensers intended for the international market outside of the US and resold them to eager American collectors. According to ABC News, Glew made $4.5 million USD in 11 years. Because the Pez company doesn’t verify through US Customs, Glew could take his illegal dispensers through the airport.

The directors Amy and Bryan Storkel worked closely with Jim Blaine of Hartland, Michigan, who owns one of the largest Pez collections in the world and has held a large annual Pez convention in Metro Detroit since 2016. He said "You watch this movie and in the end you realize, it's a love story about Glew and his wife, Kathy." and that "The support she has for him almost brings you to tears. In the end, it wasn't about Pez, it was about the love a man had for his family that he would do anything for."

== See also ==
- List of films with a 100% rating on Rotten Tomatoes
