= List of MTV Entertainment Studios productions =

Showtime/MTV Entertainment Studios (also known as MTV Entertainment Studios and formerly MTV Production Development from 2003 until 2018 and MTV Studios from 2018 until 2021) was an American film and television production and distribution company and was the film and television production arm of the MTV Entertainment Group, itself a subsidiary of the Paramount Media Networks division of Paramount Skydance.

== Filmography ==
=== Films ===
Title	Release date	Distributor	Notes
Joe's Apartment	July 26, 1996	Warner Bros. Pictures	co-production with Geffen Pictures and Blue Sky Studios (animation)
Beavis and Butt-Head Do America	December 20, 1996	Paramount Pictures	Based on the television series Beavis and Butt-Head by Mike Judge co-production with MTV Animation, Geffen Pictures and Judgemental Films
Dead Man on Campus	August 21, 1998	Paramount Pictures	co-production with Pacific Western Productions
Varsity Blues	January 15, 1999	Paramount Pictures	co-production with Tollin/Robbins Productions
200 Cigarettes	February 26, 1999	Paramount Pictures	co-production with Lakeshore Entertainment
Election	May 7, 1999	Paramount Pictures	co-production with Bona Fide Productions
The Wood	July 16, 1999	Paramount Pictures	
The Original Kings of Comedy	August 18, 2000	Paramount Pictures	co-production with Latham Entertainment and 40 Acres & A Mule Filmworks
Save the Last Dance	January 12, 2001	Paramount Pictures	co-production with Cort/Madden Productions
Pootie Tang	June 29, 2001	Paramount Pictures	co-production with Chris Rock Productions, HBO Downtown Productions, 3 Arts Entertainment and Alphaville Films
Orange County	January 11, 2002	Paramount Pictures	co-production with Scott Rudin Productions
Crossroads	February 15, 2002	Paramount Pictures	co-production with Zomba Films
Martin Lawrence Live: Runteldat	August 2, 2002	Paramount Pictures	co-production with Runteldat Entertainment
Jackass: The Movie	October 25, 2002	Paramount Pictures	A feature film continuation to the Jackass series First film in the Jackass franchise co-production with Dickhouse Productions and Lynch Siderow Productions
Better Luck Tomorrow	April 11, 2003	Paramount Pictures	Distribution only
The Fighting Temptations	September 19, 2003	Paramount Pictures	co-production with Handprint Films
Tupac: Resurrection	November 14, 2003	Paramount Pictures	co-production with Amaru Entertainment
The Perfect Score	January 30, 2004	Paramount Pictures	co-production with Roger Birnbaum Productions and Tollin/Robbins Productions
Napoleon Dynamite	June 11, 2004	Fox Searchlight Pictures (North and Latin America, Italy, Turkey and Japan); Paramount Pictures (International)	Distribution only produced by Napoleon Pictures
Coach Carter	January 14, 2005	Paramount Pictures	co-production with Tollin/Robbins Productions
The Longest Yard	May 27, 2005	Paramount Pictures (North America); Sony Pictures Releasing International (International)	Remake of the 1974 film of the same name co-production with Columbia Pictures, Happy Madison Productions and Callahan Filmworks
Hustle & Flow	July 22, 2005	Paramount Classics	Distribution only produced by New Deal Entertainment
Murderball	July 22, 2005	THINKFilm	co-production with Participant Media and A&E IndieFilms
Get Rich or Die Tryin'	November 9, 2005	Paramount Pictures	co-production with G-Unit Films/Interscope/Shady/Aftermath Films
Æon Flux	December 2, 2005	Paramount Pictures	A live-action feature film adaptation to the animated series co-production with Lakeshore Entertainment and Valhalla Motion Pictures
Jackass Number Two	September 22, 2006	Paramount Pictures	co-production with Dickhouse Productions and Lynch Siderow Productions
Freedom Writers	January 5, 2007	Paramount Pictures	co-production with Jersey Films and 2S Films
Blades of Glory	March 30, 2007	Paramount Pictures	co-production with DreamWorks Pictures, Red Hour Films and Smart Entertainment
How She Move	January 25, 2008	Paramount Vantage	Distribution outside Canada only produced by Celluloid Dreams and Sienna Films
Stop-Loss	March 28, 2008	Paramount Pictures	
The Foot Fist Way	May 30, 2008	Paramount Vantage	Distribution only produced by Gary Sanchez Productions and You Know I Can't Kiss You, Inc.
Dance Flick	May 22, 2009	Paramount Pictures	co-production with Wayans Bros. Entertainment
Jackass 3D	October 15, 2010	Paramount Pictures	co-production with Dickhouse Productions
Justin Bieber: Never Say Never	February 11, 2011	Paramount Pictures	co-production with Insurge Pictures, AEG Live, Island Records, Scooter Braun Films and L.A. Reid Media
Footloose	October 14, 2011	Paramount Pictures	Remake of the 1984 film of the same name co-production with Spyglass Entertainment, Unique Features, Dylan Sellers, Weston Pictures, Zadan/Meron, Southern Cross the Dog and Storyline Entertainment
Katy Perry: Part of Me	July 3, 2012	Paramount Pictures	co-production with Insurge Pictures, Imagine Entertainment, AEG Live, Magical Elves Productions, Splinter Films, Pulse Films and EMI Music
Hansel & Gretel: Witch Hunters	January 25, 2013	Paramount Pictures	co-production with Metro-Goldwyn-Mayer, Gary Sanchez Productions, Studio Babelsberg and Flynn Picture Company
Jackass Presents: Bad Grandpa	October 25, 2013	Paramount Pictures	A spin-off in the Jackass franchise co-production with Dickhouse Productions
Project Almanac	January 30, 2015	Paramount Pictures	co-production with Insurge Pictures and Platinum Dunes
Eli	October 18, 2019	Netflix	co-production with Paramount Players, Intrepid Pictures and Bellevue Productions
76 Days	December 4, 2020	MTV Documentary Films	Distribution only produced by 76 Days LLC, Ford Foundation, XTR and Sundance Institute
Finding Yingying	December 11, 2020	MTV Documentary Films	Distribution only produced by Kartemquin Films, Mitten Media and Nika Media
17 Blocks	February 19, 2021	MTV Documentary Films	Distribution only produced by Beachside Films, Bunny Lake Films and 21 Balloons Productions
Pink Skies Ahead	May 8, 2021	MTV Entertainment Studios	Distribution only produced by Stampede Ventures, Divide/Conquer, Foton Pictures and Glanzrock Productions
Ascension	October 8, 2021	MTV Documentary Films	Distribution only produced by XTR, Firelight Media, Field of Vision, Cinereach, Chicken & Egg Pictures, The Sundance Institute and San Francisco Film Society
Coded: The Hidden Love of J.C. Leyendecker	November 22, 2021	Paramount+	Distribution via MTV Documentary Films only produced by Imagine Documentaries and Deliero Films
Jackass Forever	February 4, 2022	Paramount Pictures	co-production with Dickhouse Productions and Gorilla Flicks
Teen Wolf: The Movie	January 26, 2023	Paramount+	A feature film continuation to the MTV series Teen Wolf co-production with MGM Television, First Cause, Inc. and Capital Arts Entertainment
The Eternal Memory	August 11, 2023	MTV Documentary Films	Distribution only produced by Micromundo and Fabula
Heist 88	September 29, 2023	Paramount+	co-production with Gunpowder & Sky and Bassett/Vance Productions
Milli Vanilli	October 24, 2023	Paramount+	co-production with MRC, Keep On Running Pictures and Fulwell 73
Pay or Die	November 1, 2023	MTV Documentary Films; Paramount+	Distribution only produced by Sons of Rigor, Salty Features, Post Road Pictures and Artemis Rising Foundation
As We Speak: Rap Music on Trial	February 27, 2024	Paramount+	co-production with District 33, Park Pictures and Strike Anywhere
¡Casa Bonita Mi Amor!	September 13, 2024	Paramount+	via MTV Documentary Films co-production with Sweet Relief Productions
Stans	August 7, 2025	AMC Theaters Distribution & Trafalgar Releasing	co-production with DIGA Studios, Shady Films, Fuqua Films and Interscope Films
Predators	September 19, 2025	MTV Documentary Films	Distribution only produced by Sweet Relief Productions and Rosewater Pictures
Jackass: Best and Last	June 26, 2026	Paramount Pictures	co-production with Dickhouse Productions

=== Direct-to-video ===
Title	Release date	Production company(s)	Distribution	Budget
Save the Last Dance 2	October 6, 2006		Paramount Home Entertainment	$5 million
Beneath	August 7, 2007	Paramount Classics	Paramount Home Entertainment	
Jackass Presents: Mat Hoffman's Tribute to Evel Knievel	May 27, 2008	Dickhouse Productions	Paramount Home Entertainment	

=== Streaming ===
Title	Release date	Service	Notes	Budget
Madame X	September 23, 2021	Paramount+		
South Park: Post Covid	November 25, 2021	Paramount+	co-production with Comedy Partners and South Park Studios	
South Park: Post Covid: The Return of Covid	December 16, 2021	Paramount+	co-production with Comedy Partners and South Park Studios	
Three Months	February 23, 2022	Paramount+	co-production with The Allegiance Theater	
South Park: The Streaming Wars	June 1, 2022	Paramount+	co-production with Comedy Partners and South Park Studios	
Beavis and Butt-Head Do the Universe	June 23, 2022	Paramount+	co-production with Titmouse, Inc., Judgmental Films and 3 Arts Entertainment	
South Park: The Streaming Wars Part 2	July 13, 2022	Paramount+	co-production with Comedy Partners and South Park Studios	
South Park: Joining the Panderverse	October 27, 2023	Paramount+	co-production with Comedy Partners and South Park Studios	
South Park (Not Suitable for Children)	December 20, 2023	Paramount+	co-production with Comedy Partners and South Park Studios	
South Park: The End of Obesity	May 25, 2024	Paramount+	co-production with Comedy Partners and South Park Studios	
I Am Ready, Warden	November 22, 2024	Paramount+	via MTV Documentary Films co-production with Meralita Films	

== Television ==
=== Television series ===
Title	Years	Network	Notes
120 Minutes	1986–2003; 2011–2013	MTV; MTV2	
Club MTV	1987–1992	MTV	
Stevie and Zoya	1987–1989	MTV	
Remote Control	1987–1990	MTV/Syndication	
Yo! MTV Raps	1988–1995; 2022	MTV; Paramount+	
House of Style	1989–2000; 2009–2014	MTV	
MTV Unplugged	1989–present	MTV/MTV Live	
Turn It Up!	1990	MTV	Chauncey Street Productions
Liquid Television	1991–1995; 2014	MTV	co-production with Colossal Pictures (seasons 1–3) and Titmouse, Inc. (season 4)
Æon Flux	1991–1995	MTV	co-production with MTV Animation and Colossal Pictures
The Real World	1992–2019	MTV/Facebook Watch	co-production with Bunim/Murray Productions
Lip Service	1992–1994	MTV	
The Jon Stewart Show	1993–1995	MTV/Syndication	co-production with Paramount Domestic Television (season 2) and Busboy Productions
The Brothers Grunt	1994–95	MTV	co-production with MTV Animation and a.k.a. Cartoon
VH1 Top 20 Video Countdown	1994–2015	VH1	
The Head	1994–96	MTV	co-production with MTV Animation
The Maxx	1995	MTV	co-production with MTV Animation
Singled Out	1995–1998; 2018–2020	MTV; Quibi	co-production with Start Entertainment
Road Rules	1995–2007	MTV	Bunim/Murray Productions
VH1 Storytellers	1996–2015	VH1	
Daria	1997–2002	MTV	MTV Animation / Heyday Media
Cartoon Sushi	1997–1998	MTV	MTV Animation / a.k.a. Cartoon / DNA Productions
Hitz	1997–1998	UPN	Vaczy-Gamble Productions / Paramount Television
Jenny	1997–1998	NBC	Mark & Howard Productions / Paramount Television
Behind the Music	1997–2014; 2021	VH1; Paramount+	CBS News (some episodes) / Paramount Television (some episodes) / Gay Rosenthal Productions / Creature Films
Three	1998	The WB	Paramount Television
True Life	1998–2017	MTV	via MTV News & Docs
Celebrity Deathmatch	1998–2002; 2006–2007	MTV; MTV2	co-production with MTV Animation and Cuppa Coffee Studio
Total Request Live	1998–2008	MTV	
The Tom Green Show	1999–2000	MTV	
Station Zero	1999	MTV	co-production with MTV Animation, Possible Worlds, C-Traze Studios and Upfront Entertainment
Downtown	1999	MTV	MTV Animation
Making the Band	2000–2009	ABC/MTV	Bunim/Murray Productions
Spy Groove	2000–2001	MTV	MTV Animation
2gether: The Series	2000–2001	MTV	Gunn & Gunn Productions / Alliance Atlantis
The Lyricist Lounge Show	2000–2001	MTV	C to the B Productions
MTV Cribs	2000–2010; 2021–2023	MTV	
Fear	2000–2002	MTV	
Jackass	2000–2002	MTV	Dickhouse Productions
Bands on the Run	2001	VH1	
Undergrads	2001	MTV; Teletoon (Canada)	co-production with MTV Animation and Decode Entertainment
Small Shots	2001–2003	The New TNN	
CMT Crossroads	2002–present	CMT	Country Music Television
Crank Yankers	2002–2007; 2019–2022	Comedy Central/MTV2	co-production with Comedy Partners, Kimmelot and ITV America
Sorority Life	2002–2003	MTV	
Clone High	2002–2003; 2023–2024	MTV/Teletoon; Max	MTV Animation / Touchstone Television (season 1) / Doozer / Lord Miller Productions / Nelvana (season 1) / ShadowMachine (season 2–present)
TV Land Legends: The 60 Minutes Interviews	2002–2004	TV Land	CBS News
3-South	2002–2003	MTV	MTV Animation / Warner Bros. Animation
as "MTV Production Development"
The Surreal Life	2003–2024	The WB/VH1/MTV	51 Minds Entertainment, Brass Ring Productions, Go Sick Productions and Renegade 83 Productions
Gerhard Reinke's Wanderlust	2003	Comedy Central	Jackhole Productions
Punk'd	2003–2007; 2012; 2015; 2020–2021	MTV/BET/The Roku Channel	Katalyst Media (seasons 1–9) / STX Entertainment (season 10–)
Trigger Happy TV	2003	Comedy Central	
Reno 911!	2003–2009; 2020–2022	Comedy Central; The Roku Channel	High Sierra Carpeting / Jersey Television (2003–2009)
The Joe Schmo Show	2003–2013; 2025	Spike (seasons 1-3); TBS (season 4)	co-production with Reese Wernick Productions, Stone Stanley Entertainment (seasons 1–2), Zoo Productions (season 3), Fly on the Wall Entertainment (season 4) and MTV Entertainment Studios (season 4)
Viva La Bam	2003–2004	MTV	18 Husky (seasons 1–3) / Dakota Pictures / Bam Margena Productions
Wildboyz	2003–2006	MTV; MTV2	Dickhouse Productions
Bands Reunited	2004–2006	VH1	VH1 Productions / Evolution Media
Pimp My Ride	2004–2007	MTV	R–Lab
I Want a Famous Face	2004–2005	MTV	Pink Sneakers Productions
TV Land Moguls	2004–2009	TV Land	CBS News
ALF's Hit Talk Show	2004	TV Land	Burt Dubrow Productions
The Assistant	2004	MTV	
Living in TV Land	2004–2006	TV Land	
Video Mods	2004–2005	MTV2	Big Bear Entertainment / IBC Entertainment
Laguna Beach: The Real Orange County	2004–2006	MTV	Go Go Luckey Productions
My Super Sweet 16	2005–2017	MTV	
Wonder Showzen	2005–2006	MTV2	USA Cable Entertainment (season 1) / PFFR
Chasing Farrah	2005	TV Land	
Next	2005–2008	MTV	Kallissa Productions / Lighthearted Entertainment
The Andy Milonakis Show	2005–2007	MTV/MTV2	Jackhole Productions
365gay News	2005–2011	Logo TV	CBS News
Breaking Bonaduce	2005–2006	VH1	3Ball Productions
But Can They Sing?	2005	VH1	Granada America
Run's House	2005–2009	MTV	Good Clean Fun / Simmons/Lathan Media Group / Bad Boy Films
Noah's Arc	2005–2006	Logo TV	
Sit Down Comedy with David Steinberg	2005–2007	TV Land	Dark Light Pictures
Can't Get a Date	2006–2008	VH1 / Logo TV	
So Notorious	2006	VH1	Alberghini/Chessler Productions
Yo Momma	2006–2007	MTV	Evolution Media / MV Productions Inc
The Hills	2006–2010	MTV	Done and Done Productions
Where My Dogs At?	2006	MTV2	MTV Animation / Enough With The Bread / Already Productions / 6 Point Harness
Dallas Cowboys Cheerleaders: Making the Team	2006–2021	CMT	co-production with Country Music Television and Triage Entertainment
Rob & Big	2006–2008	MTV	Dickhouse Productions
Bam's Unholy Union	2007	MTV	co-production with Bam Margera Productions
Wrestling Society X	2007	MTV	co-production with Big Vision Entertainment
Human Giant	2007–2008	MTV	co-production with 3 Arts Entertainment
Friday: The Animated Series	2007	MTV2	co-production with MTV Animation, New Line Television and Cube Vision
Room 401	2007	MTV	Toy Plane Industries / Proud Mary Entertainment / Katalyst Films
A Shot at Love with Tila Tequila	2007	MTV	495 Productions
Kaya	2007	MTV	co-production with CTV, Flame Ventures, Kedzie Productions and Protocol Entertainment
Newport Harbor: The Real Orange County	2007–2008	MTV	Go Go Luckey Productions
Celebrity Rehab with Dr. Drew	2008	VH1	co-production with Irwin Entertainment
America's Best Dance Crew	2008–2015	MTV	co-production with Warner Horizon Television, Tenth Planet Productions, Hip Hop International, Bayonne Entertainment and Dream Merchant Entertainment
50 Cent: The Money and the Power	2008–2009	MTV	Ish Entertainment / Shady Records / Aftermath Entertainment / Interscope Records / Cheetah Vision Films
The City	2008–2010	MTV	Done and Done Productions
RuPaul's Drag Race	2009–present	Logo TV/MTV	World of Wonder
How's Your News?	2009	MTV	AM/FM Pictures
Rob Dyrdek's Fantasy Factory	2009–2015	MTV	Gorilla Flicks
T.I.'s Road to Redemption	2009	MTV	Category 5 Entertainment / Grand Hustle Productions / Ish Entertainment
Tough Love	2009–2013	VH1	High Noon Entertainment / Flower Films
The Cougar	2009	TV Land	Warner Horizon Television / Next Entertainment
16 and Pregnant	2009–2021	MTV	11th Street Productions
DJ & the Fro	2009	MTV	Titmouse, Inc. / Double Hemm
Have My Day	2009	TV Land	co-production with Sony Pictures Television, Embassy Row and Monkey Kingdom
Popzilla	2009	MTV	co-production with Animax Entertainment
Jersey Shore	2009–2012	MTV	co-production with 495 Productions
Teen Mom	2009–2021	MTV	11th Street Productions
First Love, Second Chance	2010	TV Land	
Hot in Cleveland	2010–2015	TV Land	Hazy Mills Productions / SamJen Productions
Harry Loves Lisa	2010	TV Land	co-production with Good Clean Fun
Teen Mom 2	2011–2022	MTV	co-production with 11th Street Productions
Skins	2011	MTV	An American adaptation of the British teen drama series Skins by Bryan Elsley and Jamie Brittain co-production with Company Pictures, Storm Dog Films and Entertainment One
Retired at 35	2011–2012	TV Land	co-production with Fore Left Productions and Acme Productions
Love & Hip Hop: New York	2011–2020	VH1	co-production with Monami Productions / Eastern TV (seasons 1–9) and Big Fish Entertainment (season 10)
Mob Wives	2011–2016	VH1	co-production with Electus, The Weinstein Company, Left/Right Productions and Just Jenn Productions
Single Ladies	2011–2014	VH1/BET Her	Flavor Unit Entertainment / The Popfilms Movie Company (seasons 1–3) / The Littlejohn Experience (season 1) / In Cahoots Media Inc. (seasons 1–3) / Blue Ice Pictures (season 4) / Water Walk Productions (season 4)
Teen Wolf	2011–2017	MTV	co-production with MGM Television, Adelstein Productions, DiGa Vision, First Cause, Inc., Lost Marbles Television and Siesta Productions
Happily Divorced	2011–2013	TV Land	Uh-Oh Productions
Awkward	2011–2016	MTV	Remote Productions / Mosquito Productions / Crazy Cat Lady Productions
Death Valley	2011	MTV	co-production with Liquid Therapy and Guitar & Pen Productions
Good Vibes	2011	MTV	co-production with Warner Horizon Television, Werner Entertainment, Rough House Pictures, Not the QB Pro. and Six Point Harness
Friendzone	2011–2014	MTV	co-production with 495 Productions
Guy Code	2011–2015	MTV2	
The Exes	2011–2015	TV Land	co-production with Mark Reisman Productions / Acme Productions
Caged	2012	MTV	co-production with Joke Productions
The Pauly D Project	2012	MTV	co-production with 495 Productions and ReignDeer Entertainment
Stevie TV	2012–2013	VH1	co-production with New Wave Entertainment
Mob Wives Chicago	2012	VH1	co-production with Electus, Just Jenn Productions, Left/Right Productions and The Weinstein Company
The Soul Man	2012–2016	TV Land	co-production with Bird and a Bear Entertainment, Hazy Mills Productions and SamJen Productions
Snooki & Jwoww	2012–2015	MTV	co-production with 495 Productions
Hollywood Exes	2012–2014	VH1	co-production with Shed Media and Lynch-Dyson Entertainment
The Inbetweeners	2012	MTV	Based on the British series of the same name by Damon Beesley and Iain Morris co-production with Bwark Productions, Kapital Entertainment and Brad Copeland Productions
This Is How I Made It	2012–2013	MTV	
Underemployed	2012–2013	MTV	Pine City
RuPaul's Drag Race All Stars	2012–present	Logo TV/VH1/Paramount+	co-production with World of Wonder
Catfish: The TV Show	2012–2024	MTV	co-production with Critical Content and Catfish Picture Company
Buckwild	2013	MTV	Parallel Entertainment Pictures / Zoo Productions
CMT Hot Twenty	2013–present	CMT	
Black Ink Crew	2013–2023	VH1	Big Fish Entertainment (seasons 1–8)
The Jenny McCarthy Show	2013	VH1	Sony Pictures Television / Embassy Row / Jenny McCarthy Productions
The Gossip Game	2013	VH1	Magilla Entertainment / District Media Entertainment/ Monami Entertainment
Forever Young	2013	TV Land	3 Ball Productions / Katalyst Films
Girl Code	2013–2018	MTV	
Inside Amy Schumer	2013–2016; 2022	Comedy Central/Paramount+	Comedy Partners / It's So Easy Productions / Irony Point / Jax Media
Zach Stone Is Gonna Be Famous	2013	MTV	3 Arts Entertainment
The Show with Vinny	2013	MTV	495 Productions / Generate Management
Hit the Floor	2013–2018	VH1/BET	The Film Syndicate / In Cahoots Media
Miami Monkey	2013	VH1	Electus / The Weinstein Company / Just Jenn Productions / Left/Right Productions
Big Tips Texas	2013	MTV	Breitenback Creative + Media / 20 West Productions
Scrubbing In	2013	MTV	Never Nominated
Kirstie	2013–2014	TV Land	Marco Pennette Productions / True Blue Productions
Are You the One?	2014–2019; 2023	MTV/Paramount+	Lighthearted Entertainment
Faking It	2014–2016	MTV	
Copycat	2014	MTV	Next Entertainment / Warner Horizon Television
Jennifer Falls	2014	TV Land	Vanity Logo Productions / Acme Productions
Finding Carter	2014–2015	MTV	The Popfilms Movie Company / Go Dog Go (season 1) / One Two Punch Productions (season 1) / Stockton Drive Inc. (season 2) / Warner Horizon Television
Make or Break: The Linda Perry Project	2014	VH1	Irwin Entertainment
Dating Naked	2014–2016	VH1/Paramount+	Lighthearted Entertainment
LeAnn & Eddie	2014	VH1	Gurney Productions / Octagon Entertainment Corporation / Maniac Creative
Atlanta Exes	2014	VH1	Shed Media / Lynch-Dyson Entertainment
I Heart Nick Carter	2014	VH1	Bischoff Hervey Entertainment
Love & Hip Hop: Hollywood	2014–2019	VH1	Monami Productions / Eastern TV (seasons 1–5) / Big Fish Entertainment (season 6)
Tiny & Shekinah's Weave Trip	2014	VH1	51 Minds Entertainment / Wikked Cat / Pretty Hustle Productions / Grand Hustle Productions
Slednecks	2014	MTV	Zoo Productions / All3Media America / Parallel Entertainment Pictures
K. Michelle: My Life	2014–2017	VH1	Eastern TV / Monami Entertainment
MTV's Got Your 6	2014	MTV	Karga Seven Pictures
Suave Says	2014–2015	VH1	Blank Paige Productions / 51 Minds Entertainment
Sorority Sisters	2014–2015	VH1	Eastern TV / Juma Entertainment
Eye Candy	2015	MTV	Blumhouse Television / Jax Media
One Bad Choice	2015	MTV	under MTV News & Docs co-production with Optomen and Jax Media
Barely Famous	2015	VH1	co-production with Good Clean Fun and 3 Arts Entertainment
Younger	2015–2021	TV Land/Paramount+	co-production with Darren Star Productions and Jax Media
Scream	2015–2019	MTV/VH1	Dimension Television (seasons 1–2) / Signpost Up Ahead (seasons 1–2) / Flavor Unit Entertainment (season 3)
Impastor	2015–2016	TV Land	co-production with CBS Studios, The Tannenbaum Company and All in Vane
The Jim Gaffigan Show	2015–2016	TV Land	Fedora Entertainment / Brillstein Entertainment Partners / Burrow Owl Productions / Jax Media / Chimichanga Productions, Inc. / Sony Pictures Television
Twinning	2015	VH1	Lighthearted Entertainment
Kingin' with Tyga	2015–2016	MTV2/MTV	3 Ball Entertainment
Todrick	2015	MTV	co-production with Brian Graden Media
Middle of the Night Show	2015	MTV	Big Breakfast
Follow the Rules	2015	MTV	51 Minds Entertainment / Flavor Unit Entertainment
Black Ink Crew: Chicago	2015–2022	VH1	Big Fish Entertainment (seasons 1–6)
The Shannara Chronicles	2016–2017	MTV/Spike	Sonar Entertainment / Farah Films / Millar Gough Ink / Raygun One
Teachers	2016–2019	TV Land	Martel & Roberts Productions
Greatest Party Story Ever	2016	MTV	Four Peaks Media Group / Den of Thieves / ShadowMachine
MTV's Suspect	2016	MTV	Critical Content / Right Mind Films
Lopez	2016–2017	TV Land	3 Arts Entertainment / Dakota Pictures / Travieso Productions / Altschuler Krinsky Works
Ladylike	2016	MTV	Bird Brain
The Amber Rose Show	2016	VH1	Stage 29 Productions
VH1 Live!	2016	VH1	Embassy Row
Loosely Exactly Nicole	2016–2018	MTV/Facebook Watch	3 Arts Entertainment / Jax Media
Mary + Jane	2016	MTV	Multi-Start Productions / Entertainment 360 / Merry Jane
Wonderland	2016	MTV; Comedy Central	Done+Dusted
Acting Out	2016	MTV	A. Smith & Co. Productions
Sweet/Vicious	2016–2017	MTV	
Stranded with a Million Dollars	2017	MTV	Tollbooth TV
Nobodies	2017–2018	TV Land/Paramount Network	co-production with Spike Cable Networks Inc., On the Day Productions and Jax Media
The Challenge: Champs vs. Stars	2017–2018	MTV	Bunim/Murray Productions
Siesta Key	2017–2023	MTV	Entertainment One
90's House	2017	MTV	Super Delicious Productions
Floribama Shore	2017–2021	MTV	co-production with 495 Productions; A successor to Jersey Shore
Amazingness	2017–2018	MTV	co-production with Superjacket Productions
Love & Hip Hop: Miami	2018–2025	VH1	co-production with Monami Productions, Eastern TV (seasons 1–2), Big Fish Entertainment (season 3) and New Group Productions (season 4)
Teen Mom: Young and Pregnant	2018–2022	MTV	
Jersey Shore: Family Vacation	2018–2026	MTV	co-production with 495 Productions; Sequel to Jersey Shore
Ex on the Beach	2018–2023	MTV	Entertainment One / Whizz Kid Entertainment / Purveyors of Pop
Yellowstone	2018–2024	Paramount Network	Spike Cable Networks / Linson Entertainment / Bosque Ranch Productions / Treehouse Films / 101 Studios
Teen Mom: Young Moms Club	2018–2019	MTV	
T.I. & Tiny: Friends & Family Hustle	2018–2020	VH1	VH1 Productions / Grand Hustle Productions / Tiny Hustle / Crossover Entertainment / 51 Minds Entertainment
Cartel Crew	2019–2021	VH1	co-production with Big Fish Entertainment (seasons 1–2)
Lindsay Lohan's Beach Club	2019	MTV	co-production with Bunim/Murray Productions
The Other Two	2019–2023	Comedy Central/HBO Max	co-production with Comedy Partners, Broadway Video, Jax Media and Kelly/Schneider
Game of Clones	2019	MTV	co-production with The Roush Wagner Company and Youngest Media
Double Shot at Love	2019–2021	MTV	co-production with 495 Productions
as "MTV Studios"
El Mundo Real	2019	Facebook Watch	co-production with Bunim/Murray Productions
The Hills: New Beginnings	2019–2021	MTV	co-production with Evolution Media
Girls Cruise	2019	VH1	co-production with Big Fish Entertainment
South Side	2019–2022	Comedy Central/HBO Max	co-production with Comedy Partners, Emerald Street, The Riddle Entertainment Group and Jax Media
Black Ink Crew: Compton	2019–2022	VH1	Big Fish Entertainment (season 1)
Ghosted: Love Gone Missing	2019–2021	MTV	Sharp Entertainment
True Life Crime	2020–2021	MTV	co-production with Good Caper Content, Karga Seven Pictures and Left/Right Productions
Awkwafina Is Nora from Queens	2020–2023	Comedy Central	co-production with Comedy Partners, In Fina We Trust and Artists First
Families of the Mafia	2020–2021	MTV	
RuPaul's Secret Celebrity Drag Race	2020–2022	VH1	co-production with World of Wonder
Revenge Prank	2020–2021	MTV	co-production with Gobstopper Television
True Life Presents: Quarantine Stories	2020	MTV	
RuPaul's Drag Race: Vegas Revue	2020	VH1	co-production with World of Wonder
as "MTV Entertainment Studios"
Deliciousness	2020–2022	MTV	co-production with Thrill One Media and Gorilla Flicks; Spin-off from Ridiculousness
VH1 Family Reunion: Love & Hip Hop Edition	2021–2023	VH1	
My Celebrity Dream Wedding	2021–present	VH1	co-production with Entertainment One
The Real World Homecoming	2021–2022	Paramount+	co-production with Bunim/Murray Productions
The Challenge: All Stars	2021–present	Paramount+/MTV	co-production with Bunim/Murray Productions
Couples Retreat	2021–present	VH1/MTV	
From Cradle to Stage	2021	Paramount+	co-production with Live Nation Entertainment, Roswell Films and Therapy Studios
Adorableness	2021	MTV	co-production with Thrill One Media and Gorilla Flicks
My True Crime Story	2021–2022	VH1	co-production with Hotsnakes Media
Messyness	2021–2022	MTV	co-production with Thrill One Media and Gorilla Flicks
Hell of A Week with Charlamagne tha God	2021–2022	Comedy Central	co-production with Comedy Partners, CThaGodWorld Productions and Spartina Productions
Queen of the Universe	2021–2023	Paramount+	co-production with World of Wonder
1883	2021–2022	Paramount+	co-production with 101 Studios, Bosque Ranch Productions and Linson Entertainment; Prequel to Yellowstone by Taylor Sheridan and John Linsom
Teen Mom: Family Reunion	2022–2024	MTV	co-production with 11th Street Productions
Teen Mom: Girl's Night In	2022–2024	MTV	co-production with 11th Street Productions
Fairview	2022	Comedy Central	co-production with CBS Studios, Late Night Cartoons, Inc., Spartina Productions, Licht Media Solutions and RJ Fried Worldwide
Becoming A Popstar	2022	MTV	co-production with Pepsi Productions, Jesse Collins Entertainment, Velocity
Hip Hop My House	2022	Paramount+	co-production with Anaid Productions
Buckhead Shore	2022	MTV	co-production with 495 Productions; Spin-off of Jersey Shore
All Star Shore	2022–2023	Paramount+	co-production with White Label Productions, ITV Studios Netherlands; An all stars adaptation of Jersey Shore.
The Challenge: USA	2022–2023	CBS	Bunim/Murray Productions
Uncoupled	2022	Netflix	co-production with Darren Star Productions, Jeffrey Richman Productions and Jax Media
The Challenge: Untold History	2022	MTV	co-production with Bunim/Murray Productions
Great Lakes Umtamed	2022	Smithsonian Channel; TVO (Canada); Arte (France)	co-production with Merit Motion Pictures, Oak Island Films, Terra Matter Studios and Two Wise Monkeys Entertainment
George & Tammy	2022–2023	Showtime	co-production with Freckle Films, 101 Studios, Mad Chance Productions, Blink Films Inc, Aunt Sylvia's Moving Picture Co. and Brolin Productions
Sampled	2022	Paramount+	co-production with 3Ball Productions and Hu
1923	2022–2025	Paramount+	co-production with 101 Studios, Linson Entertainment and Bosque Ranch Productions; Sequel to western drama miniseries 1883 and prequel to Yellowstone by Taylor Sheridan and John Linson
Sometimes When We Touch	2023	Paramount+	co-production with Gunpowder & Sky
Wolf Pack	2023	Paramount+	co-production with First Cause, Inc. and Capital Arts Entertainment
Waco: The Aftermath	2023	Showtime	co-production with Spyglass Media Group, 101 Studios and Brothers Bowdle Productions; Sequel to the 2018 miniseries Waco
The Family Stallone	2023–2024	Paramount+	co-production with Bunim/Murray Productions
Lawmen: Bass Reeves	2023	Paramount+	co-production with Catch Fire, Yoruba Saxon, Bosque Ranch Productions and 101 Studios
De La Calle	2023	Paramount+	co-production with Zero Point Zero Production

=== Television specials ===
Title	Network	Original run	Production company(s)
MTV New Year's Eve specials	MTV	1981–2014	MTV News
Camp MTV	MTV	1989	
VH1 Honors	VH1	1994	Ken Ehrlich Productions
VH1 Fashion and Music Awards	VH1	1995	
My VH1 Music Awards	VH1	2000–2001	
MTV's Ultimate Cover Band Battle	MTV	2000	
MTV Icon	MTV/MTV2	2001–2004	
Testimony: 20 Years of Rock on MTV	MTV	2001	
Remaking Taylor Dane	VH1	2005	
Remaking Vince Neil	VH1	2005	
As "MTV Production Development"
CBS News on Logo: Special Report on AIDS	Logo TV	2005	CBS News
The Making of Jackass the Game	MTV	2007	Red Mile Entertainment/ Dickhouse Productions
It Gets Better	Logo TV; MTV	2012	Snackaholic / Hypomania Content / Octagon Entertainment
Laverine Cox: The T Word	Logo TV; MTV	2014	Ish Entertainment / Gigantic! Productions
Nicki Minaj: My Time Again	MTV	2015	RadicalMedia
As "MTV Studios"
In Session Live with Dr. Jess	VH1	2018	Big Fish Entertainment / CThaGodWorld Productions
RuPaul's Drag Race Holi-slay Spectacular	VH1	2018	World of Wonder
The Challenge: CT's Getting Married	MTV	2018	Bunim/Murray Productions
Hollywood Exes: Reunited	VH1	2020	New Pop Culture Productions
As "MTV Entertainment Studios"
Dragging the Classics: The Brady Bunch	Paramount+	2021	World of Wonder
Roy Wood Jr.: Imperfect Messenger	Comedy Central	2021	Comedy Partners / Bob Bain Productions / Mainstay Entertainment
Reno 911!: The Hunt for QAnon	Paramount+	2021	Comedy Partners / High Sierra Carpeting
South Park: The 25th Anniversary Concert	Comedy Central	2022	Comedy Partners / Alex Coletti Productions
Jeff Dunham: Me the People	Comedy Central	2022	Red Wire Blue Wire / Triage Entertainment
Jeff Dunham: I'm with Cupid	Comedy Central	2024	Red Wire Blue Wire / Triage Entertainment

=== Television movies ===
Title	Network	Years	Production company(s)
Two of Us	VH1	2000	Viacom Productions
2gether	MTV	2000	Keystone Pictures / 2gether Productions
Jailbait	MTV	2000	Once Upon a Time Films
Meat Loaf: To Hell and Back	VH1	2000	
Is It Fall Yet?	MTV	2000	MTV Animation
Love Song	MTV	2000	Viacom Productions
The Way She Moves	VH1	2001	Wilshire Court Productions / Charter Films / Randwell
Anatomy of a Hate Crime	MTV	2001	Team Entertainment
Too Leight: The MC Hammer Story	VH1	2001	Wilshire Court Productions / Charter Films
Warning: Parental Advisory	VH1	2002	
Fat Camp: An MTV Docs Movie Presentation	MTV	2006	Gigantic Productions
All You've Got	MTV	2006	Paramount Home Entertainment
Totally Awesome	VH1	2006	Paramount Home Entertainment / 3 Arts Entertainment / The Weinstein Company
Super Sweet 16: The Movie	MTV	2007	Paramount Home Entertainment
My Super Psycho Sweet 16	MTV	2009	In Cahoots Media, Inc. / The Popfilms Movie Company
My Super Psycho Sweet 16: Part 2	MTV	2010	In Cahoots Media, Inc. / The Popfilms Movie Company
My Super Psycho Sweet 16: Part 3	MTV	2012	In Cahoots Media, Inc. / The Popfilms Movie Company
CrazySexyCool: The TLC Story	VH1	2013	VH1 Productions / Diggit Entertainment Group / In Cahoots Media, Inc. / The Popfilms Movie Company
No Cameras Allowed	MTV	2014	Fake Empire Productions
The Dorm	MTV	2014	Sony Pictures Television / Nomadic Pictures
The Breaks	VH1	2016	VH1 Productions
Adventures in Christmasing	VH1	2021	Johnson Production Group / K-Lab Studios
The Bitch Who Stole Christmas	VH1	2021	World of Wonder
A Clüsterfünke Christmas	Comedy Central	2021	Comedy Partners / Lighthouse Pictures / Wishing Floor Films
Hip Hop Family Christmas	VH1	2021	Foxx Tales / Nexus Films
Hot Mess Holiday	Comedy Central	2021	Comedy Partners / Gunpowder & Sky
Let's Get Merried	VH1	2021	UnbeliEVAble Entertainment / Blue Ice Pictures
Miracle Across 125th Street	VH1	2021	Ncredible Entertainment / Capital Arts Entertainment
Out of Office	Comedy Central	2022	CBS Studios / Propagate Content
Cursed Friends	Comedy Central	2022	Propagate Content / Electric Avenue / Artists First
Hip Hop Family Christmas Wedding	VH1	2022	Foxx Tales / Nexus Films
All I Didn't Want for Christmas	VH1	2022	Blue Ice Pictures
A New Diva's Christmas Carol	VH1	2022	Green Door Pictures / Blue Ice Pictures
Fuhgeddabout Christmas	VH1	2022	Pichy Productions
Pretty Stoned	MTV	2023	Capital Arts Entertainment
Office Race	Comedy Central	2023	Above Average / Believe Entertainment Group

== Cancelled projects ==
=== Television series ===
Title	Network	Years	Production company(s)	Notes
Dating at Sea	MTV	Halted		
The Hills: The Next Generation	MTV	Halted		
Jersey Shore 2.0	MTV	Halted	495 Productions	
Power Game	MTV	Halted		

=== Films ===
Title	Release date	Production company(s)	Distribution
Jodie	Dropped	Comedy Central	
