= Angela Raiola =

American reality TV personality (1960–2016)

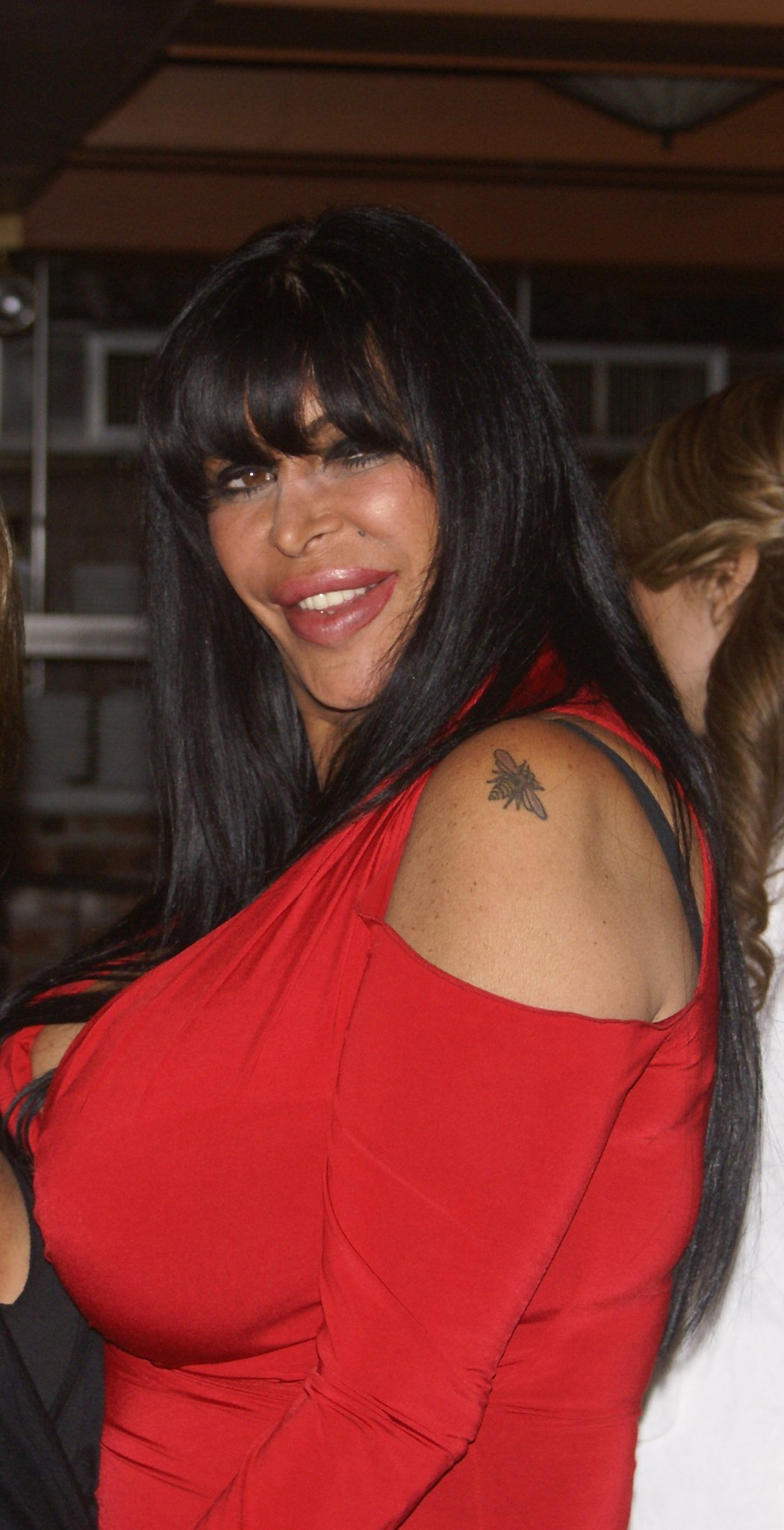
- Raiola in 2012
- Born: Angela Joyce Raiola; June 30, 1960; New York City, U.S.
- Died: February 18, 2016 (aged 55); New York City, U.S.
- Other name: Big Ang
- Occupation: Television personality
- Years active: 2011–2016
- Known for: Mob Wives
- Spouse: Neil Murphy (m. 2009)
- Children: 2

Angela Joyce "Big Ang" Raiola (June 30, 1960 – February 18, 2016) was an American reality television personality. She was the niece of Salvatore "Sally Dogs" Lombardi (1941–2009), a caporegime ("capo") and drug dealer in the Genovese crime family. Raiola dated gangsters and lived an opulent lifestyle.

Raiola starred in the VH1 reality television series Mob Wives from its second to sixth and final season in 2016. She was featured in her own spin-off series Big Ang in 2012 and Miami Monkey in 2013. At age 55, Raiola died from complications of lung cancer and pneumonia on February 18, 2016.

== Life and career ==
Raiola was born in Brooklyn, New York. She had two children, Raquel and Anthony (AJ) Donofrio. She married Neil Murphy in 2009.

=== 2001 arrest ===
In May 2001, Raiola was one of fifteen defendants indicted—and later convicted—for their roles in a narcotics operation, which distributed crack cocaine, powdered cocaine, and marijuana in Brooklyn and Manhattan. Federal agents described Raiola as an associate of the drug ring's leader, who was sentenced to nearly thirteen years in prison. She was provided cocaine for "street level distribution," according to an affidavit sworn by a DEA agent and an NYPD detective. Raiola sold the drug from Brooklyn bars where she worked. The case against Raiola and her codefendants was built with the aid of wiretapped conversations, the work of an undercover NYPD detective posing as a drug trafficker, and a confidential informant (CI) who made cocaine buys at the direction of federal agents. Some targets of the federal investigation were low-level associates of the Colombo crime family. Raiola was indicted in May 2001 on six felony counts. Along with a conspiracy-to-distribute charge, she was hit with five counts related to separate cocaine sales she made to the CI. At the time of her arrest, Raiola's handbag contained fourteen small plastic bags containing cocaine.

In March 2003, nearly two years after her arrest, Raiola—who was free on $100,000 bond—pleaded guilty to the indictment's top count. In October 2003, she was sentenced to three years' probation and ordered to spend four months under home confinement. Nine months later, in July 2004, a federal judge issued an order modifying Raiola's probation conditions. She was directed by Judge Sterling Johnson Jr. to enroll in "an outpatient and/or inpatient drug treatment or detoxification program." Court records do not indicate what prompted this order. Of the fifteen defendants indicted in the drug case, nine were sentenced to probation. The other six received prison terms ranging from 33 to 151 months.

=== The Drunken Monkey ===
In 2007, Raiola opened a Staten Island bar, The Drunken Monkey, with her cousin SallyAnn Lombardi who held the license, but the bar was forced to shut down in 2015 due to Raiola's past as a convicted felon.

=== Reality television ===
In 2011, Raiola was filmed in what would become her break into reality television, Mob Wives. She made her debut as a regular cast member in the show's second season, which premiered January 1, 2012. Raiola would remain as a series regular for the remaining duration of the show's run, and while she filmed one reunion episode on February 13, she was on set for only two hours due to her illness.

== Illness and death ==
Raiola was first diagnosed with cancer in March 2015, which her doctors said was "positively" caused by smoking cigarettes. Raiola, a smoker of 40 years, quit smoking the day she was diagnosed. She was then told she had a "lemon-sized" tumor in her throat, for which she underwent surgery in June. In August she revealed she was diagnosed with lung cancer. By December 2015, Raiola had been declared cancer-free twice, however, by January, Raiola was diagnosed with stage four brain and lung cancer.

Raiola died at 3:01 a.m. on February 18, 2016, at a hospital in New York City, due to excessive complications from the cancer. At the time of her death, she lived in Ward Hill, New York.

Raiola's funeral mass was held on February 22, 2016, at Basilica of Regina Pacis church in Brooklyn, New York, and attended by Mob Wives co-stars Karen Gravano, Drita D'Avanzo, Carla Facciolo and Renee Graziano.

== Filmography ==
Year	Title	Character	Notes
2012–2016	Mob Wives	Herself	Main cast member (seasons 2–6)
2012–2013	The Wendy Williams Show	Herself	Guest
2012	Big Ang	Herself	Main cast member
2013	Miami Monkey	Herself	Main cast member
2013	Scary Movie 5	Real Housewife	Feature film
2014	Bethenny	Herself	Guest
2015	The Real	Herself	Guest
2015	Staten Island Summer	Herself	Feature film
2015	Celebrity Wife Swap	Herself	Season 4, episode 10
2015	Couples Therapy	Herself	Main cast member (season 6)
2015	David Tutera's CELEBrations	Herself	Season 8, episode 7
2016	The Dr. Oz Show	Herself	Guest; last television appearance before her death

== Bibliography ==
- Bigger Is Better: Real Life Wisdom from the No-Drama Mama; ISBN 1451699603 (2012)
