= Big Ang (TV series) =

American reality television series

- Genre: Reality
- Creative director: Salana Rodriguez
- Starring: Angela "Big Ang" Raiola
- Country of origin: United States
- Original language: English
- No. of seasons: 1
- No. of episodes: 10

Production
- Executive producers: Banks Tarver; Ben Silverman; Bob Weinstein; David Glasser; Harvey Weinstein; Jeff Olde; Jennifer Graziano; Jimmy; Ken Druckerman; Meryl Poster; Nina L. Diaz; Shelly Tatro
- Camera setup: Multiple
- Running time: 21 to 23 minutes
- Production companies: Electus; The Weinstein Company; Left/Right Productions; Just Jenn Productions

Original release
- Network: VH1
- Release: July 8 – September 2, 2012

Related
- Mob Wives

Big Ang is an American reality television series that premiered on VH1 on July 8, 2012, starring Angela "Big Ang" Raiola, who first received television exposure on the second season of the reality television series Mob Wives.

In May 2013, Raiola confirmed during an interview that a second season of the show was being produced, but it was later revealed that the season would be retooled as another spin-off titled Miami Monkey, which premiered on September 8, 2013.

== Production ==
Big Ang is a spin-off of Mob Wives. The series premiered July 8, 2012, on VH1. The series was produced by Electus, The Weinstein Company, Left/Right Productions, and Just Jenn Productions. It ran for one season of ten episodes, with episodes running 21 to 23 minutes.

Raiola confirmed during an interview in May 2013 that a second season of Big Ang was being produced, but it was later revealed that the season would be retooled as another spin-off titled Miami Monkey, which premiered on September 8, 2013.

== Cast ==
=== Main ===
- Angela "Big Ang" Raiola
- Neil Murphy, Big Ang's husband
- Anthony "A.J." D'Onofrio, Big Ang's son
- Janine, Big Ang's sister
- Dominick, Janine's husband
- Linda Torres, Big Ang's friend
- Lil' Jenn, Big Ang's friend
- Lil' Louis, Big Ang's dog

=== Guests ===
- Drita D'Avanzo
- Renee Graziano
- Liv Kingston
- Sheila Gambino

== Episodes ==
No.	Title	Original release date	US viewers (millions)
0	"Big Ang Trailer"	June 25, 2012	1.53
1	"Big Shots"	July 8, 2012	0.67
After five years of running the bar Drunken Monkey, Ang has given the bar a facelift to draw a younger crowd. In preparation for her "re-grand opening" she hires a group of young men to serve shots, and recruits her friends Linda and Jen and her sister Janine to help with the event. Meanwhile, Ang entertains an unexpected proposal from her estranged husband, Neil.
2	"Big House"	July 15, 2012	0.60
After a heart-attack scare, Ang quits drinking and smoking cold-turkey to attempt a healthier lifestyle. She gives Neil a "third chance" and lets him move back in, but second-guesses her decision when he arrives with a truckload of boxes. Needing more room she and Janine make an offer on a house containing a spa, a palm tree by the pool, and a stage in the living room.
3	"Big Dogs"	July 22, 2012	0.60
Ang enters her dog Lil' Louie in a dog show, and has a housewarming party after moving into her new home.
4	"Big Spender"	July 29, 2012	0.54
Big Ang and her friends have a vacation in Florida and Angela will try anything to get a condo.
5	"Big Bust"	August 5, 2012	0.71
It's time for the annual Drunken Monkey trip to Atlantic City! Big Ang leads a bus full of her patrons, bar staff and friends down to AC for a day of gambling, drinking and dirty dancing.
6	"Big Time"	August 12, 2012	0.69
Big Ang's son AJ is released from jail and finally grants his mom's wish by moving back home, along with his rambunctious pit bull, Kilo.
7	"Big Surprise"	August 19, 2012	0.60
Big Ang's birthday is just days apart from Linda and Janine's birthdays, which usually means one week a year is packed with parties. But this year Ang decides to celebrate a little differently.
8	"Big Ink"	August 26, 2012	0.67
Big Ang and Neil head to get tattoos and Neil gets a very surprising tattoo on his calf.
9	"Big Pride"	August 26, 2012	0.75
Big Ang and friends head to the gay pride event in New York City. At this event, Big Ang thinks up a big idea which is sure to be a success.
10	"Big Finale"	September 2, 2012	0.63
Big Ang opens her salon and has a party for AJ.
