= Mob Wives: The Sit Down =

- Genre: Talk show
- Created by: Jennifer Graziano
- Presented by: Carrie Keagan
- Country of origin: United States
- Original language: English
- No. of seasons: 1
- No. of episodes: 7

Production
- Executive producers: Banks Tarver; Ben Silverman; Bob Weinstein; Harvey Weinstein; Jeff Olde; Jennifer Graziano; Jimmy Fox; Kari McFarland; Ken Druckerman; Nina L. Diaz; Rick Hankey; Shelly Tatro
- Running time: 20 to 23 minutes
- Production companies: Electus Entertainment; The Weinstein Company; Left/Right Productions; Just Jenn Productions

Original release
- Network: VH1
- Release: January 29 – March 27, 2012

Related
- Mob Wives

Mob Wives: The Sit Down is an American half-hour post-show that follows after season two episodes of Mob Wives, first broadcast on VH1 on January 29, 2012. The series is hosted by Carrie Keagan.

Each episode has 2-3 of the cast members, along with a celebrity guest, who discuss the events that unfolded during the episode that aired the hour before. The cast members share behind-the-scenes information or clips. The series ran for only seven episodes.

== Episodes ==
No.	Title	Original release date	US viewers (millions)
1	"The Sit Down: Premiere"	January 29, 2012	1.132
2	"The Sit Down: Fights and Facials"	February 12, 2012	0.466
3	"The Sit Down: Mob Daughters"	February 19, 2012	0.594
4	"The Sit Down: Tricks or Treats?"	March 4, 2012	0.409
5	"The Sit Down: Cabin Fever"	March 11, 2012	0.499
6	"The Sit Down: Fire Away"	March 18, 2012	0.555
7	"The Sit Down: Torn Apart"	March 27, 2012	N/A
