= Winsanity =

American television game show (2016–2018)

- Genre: Game show
- Created by: Cleve Keller; Dave Noll
- Directed by: Hal Grant
- Presented by: Donald Faison
- Narrated by: Kira Soltanovich (Season 1)
- Country of origin: United States
- Original language: English
- No. of seasons: 2
- No. of episodes: 80

Production
- Executive producers: Chris Grant; Barry Poznick (Season 1); Michael Canter; Jeff Krask (Season 2)
- Producers: Ebonice Atkins; Brett McVicker; Dave Schapiro; Blair Baskin
- Production locations: Red Studios; Los Angeles, California, United States
- Editors: Jamil Nelson; Eric Kenehan
- Running time: 20−22 minutes
- Production companies: Electus; Barracuda Television Productions, Inc. (Season 1)

Original release
- Network: Game Show Network
- Release: June 9, 2016 – May 24, 2018

Winsanity is an American television game show broadcast by Game Show Network (GSN). The series, hosted by Donald Faison, premiered June 9, 2016.

== Gameplay ==
=== First format ===
The game starts with a contestant being chosen from the audience. Every person is given a glowing wristband called a winwatch, so they can participate in the game. To start the show, Faison hits the "Winsanity" button on the stage to lock in on a random contestant by turning their winwatch green. Once that contestant is chosen, they join Faison on the stage and win prizes for themselves and the audience.

The objective of the game is to place ten numerical facts in order with the highest number on top and the lowest number on the bottom. Each round builds upon the previously placed facts, making the last round the hardest.

At the start of each round, announcer Kira Soltanovich starts the selector to choose additional audience members. The contestant hits the Winsanity button, which randomly chooses a select number of members of the audience. Soltanovich announces a prize that can be won by both the contestant and the audience. Faison then announces how many members of the audience were selected. Soltanovich announces the topic for the round. From there, Faison announces what the facts are and the contestant decides where on the list they need to go.

Round	Items to place	Special Notes
1	4 items	Guaranteed prize awarded this round
2	3 items	
3	2 items	
4	1 item	$5,000 & a new car for the sole audience member $5,000 & a new car for the on-stage contestant

If the contestant places a fact in the wrong spot, someone else from the audience takes their place and finishes off the list. Also, if the original contestant placed a fact incorrectly in a later round than the first round, then all of the prizes are taken away except for the prize in the first round. If the contestant playing in the fourth round is a contestant who won prizes in a previous round, they're given the option to walk away with all of the prizes that they already won or continue playing.

=== Second format ===
The audience was split into two color-coded sections, the purple section and the gold section. One contestant from the purple section was randomly selected to go head to head against a contestant who was randomly selected from the gold section.

==== Round 1 ====
In the first round, a starter fact is placed on the board with its number revealed with four more facts that are given. The contestants take turns placing each fact. Correct answers are worth $100 on the first turn and $200 on the second turn. Incorrect answers earn no money.

==== Round 2 ====
In the second round, four more facts are given in addition to the five facts from the first round. Correct answers are worth $300 on the first turn and $400 on the second turn.

==== Round 3 ====
In the third round, a new list is given with two starter facts and their numbers revealed with four more facts that are given one at a time. When the contestant is given a fact, they can choose to play it or if they don't know where to put it, they can challenge their opponent to play it. If a fact is placed in the correct spot, the contestant who played it earns the money, but if it's placed in the wrong spot, that money goes to the opposing contestant. The first fact is worth $500, the second is worth $600, the third is worth $700, and the final is worth $1,750. The contestant with the most money at the end of the round wins the game and gets to play in the final five for a chance to augment their total winnings to $10,000.

==== The Final Five ====
The final five is the bonus round of the game, where the winning contestant is shown five facts and five numbers. The contestant is given 45 seconds to match each fact to its corresponding number on a touch screen and if they think they matched all of them correctly, they stop the clock by pressing a red button next to the screen. If they didn't get all five right, Faison reveals only how many are in the right position. The contestant is given one more chance to change the ones that they think they got wrong. If they still did not get all of them right, they get an additional $500 for each one that they did get right.

== Production ==
The series was officially green-lit on November 18, 2015, and premiered on June 9, 2016. GSN also produced an online version of the game, which can be played on their website.

On March 14, 2017, GSN announced that Winsanity would return for a second season, but with a new head-to-head format. The second season was originally to have premiered on November 27, 2017, however, it was later pulled from GSN's schedule without explanation. The new episodes eventually appeared beginning on April 2, 2018.

== Reception ==
The premiere episodes performed relatively well by GSN standards, garnering 501,000 and 416,000 viewers for the two episodes airing on June 9. A combined total of 13.5 million viewers watched the series during its 40-episode first season.

== International versions ==
In Greece, a version titled Pano Kato (English: "Up and down") premiered on September 16, 2019. Hosted by Christos Ferentinos, it is broadcast on Alpha TV daily at 5:50 p.m.
