= Mob Wives Chicago =

- Genre: Reality
- Created by: Jennifer Graziano
- Starring: Christina Scoleri; Leah DeSimone; Nora Schweihs; Pia Rizza; Renee Fecarotta Russo
- Opening theme: "Playing for Keeps" by Elle King
- Country of origin: United States
- Original language: English
- No. of seasons: 1
- No. of episodes: 11

Production
- Executive producers: Banks Tarver; Ben Silverman; Bob Weinstein; Harvey Weinstein; Jeff Olde; Jennifer Graziano; Jimmy Fox; Kari McFarland; Ken Druckerman; Nina L. Diaz; Rick Hankey; Shelly Tatro; Amsterdam
- Camera setup: Multiple
- Running time: 42 minutes
- Production companies: Electus; Just Jenn Productions; Left/Right Productions; Weinstein Company

Original release
- Network: VH1
- Release: June 10 – August 19, 2012

Related
- Mob Wives

Mob Wives Chicago is an American reality television series that premiered on VH1 on June 10, 2012. Developed as a spin-off of Mob Wives, with a new cast based in Chicago, Illinois.

On May 7, 2012, the introduction for the show was filmed behind Chicago's Cassidy Tire on Canal Street.

On April 29, 2012, the first promo for the show aired, during an episode of the original series. On May 27, 2012, a preview special of the series aired after the second season Mob Wives reunion special.

On October 14, 2012, cast member Pia Rizza tweeted that "#MobWivesChicago is over now I don't see the need to keep reliving the drama that killed the show time 2 move forward new chapter new time," confirming that Mob Wives Chicago had been canceled.

== Cast ==
=== Main ===
- Pia Rizza is the daughter of Vincent Rizza, who worked for The Chicago Outfit, then subsequently testified against them and entered the Federal Witness Protection Program.
- Nora Schweihs is the daughter of the late Frank "The German" Schweihs, who was a notorious and feared hitman for the Chicago Mafia.
- Renee Fecarotta Russo is a niece of the now deceased "Big John" Fecarotta, who raised her and was also a loan collector and hitman for the Mafia.
- Christina Scoleri is the daughter of Raymond Janek, a one-time thief and fence for the Chicago Outfit.
- Leah DeSimone is the daughter of Wolf DeSimone, a reputed mafia associate.

=== Recurring ===
- Kiana is Renee's 20-year-old daughter. Her father is serving life in prison for murder. Despite Renee's disagreement, Kiana remains in contact with her father.
- Julie is Nora's best friend from Florida who is the only one that met her father. Also a psychic medium.
- Bella Rizza is Pia's teenage daughter.
- Dave is Renee's boyfriend, business partner, and one of Pia's acquaintances.
- Sheila Gambino is Pia's friend and niece of Carlo "Don Carlo" Gambino.

== Episodes ==
No.	Title	Original release date	U.S. viewers (millions)
1	"Fight Night"	June 10, 2012	0.672
Christina has too much to drink and when she offends Nora, who offends Pia, the situation quickly changes to Pia and Christina's getting into an argument. When glass is thrown, Pia attacks Christina. Hair-pulling and punching occurs and the two women are pulled apart.
2	"The Aftermath"	June 17, 2012	0.508
Christina is left alone after Nora, Pia and Renee choose not to talk with her but Leah is the one who offers her advice.
3	"You Can't Handle the Truce"	June 24, 2012	0.487
Pia and Christina end their friendship while Nora invites some of the ladies over for a memorial luncheon on the anniversary of her father's passing.
4	"When Renee Attacks"	July 1, 2012	0.419
Christina chooses to talk with Pia and resolve their issues. Renee is shocked when Nora confronts her due to her disrespectful behavior.
5	"Heartbreak and Betrayal"	July 8, 2012	0.481
While angry, Pia says some personal information relating to Nora, which shocks everyone.
6	"Party Animals"	July 15, 2012	0.575
Nora and Pia are resentful towards each other, and choose not to speak. Nora and Renee are also not on speaking terms. Christina wants all of the ladies to come together and celebrate happiness.
7	"Sticks and Stones"	July 22, 2012	0.461
Christina's party ends up turning into a drama festival, and Christina is determined to figure out who started it. Pia and Renee attempt to mend their friendship.
8	"Daddy Issues"	July 29, 2012	0.555
Giana tries to get answers from her currently incarcerated father, while Renee goes to court. Nora receives more information about her father's burial.
9	"Shift Happens"	August 5, 2012	0.505
Christina comes to terms with her divorce and discusses living with her ex. Pia works at jumpstarting a new career. Nora gathers information to exhume her father.
10	"Walk Away Renee"	August 12, 2012	0.454
The ladies gather to support Leah, and her mother who suffered from breast cancer, and walk for a breast cancer charity. Leah asks the group to stay together, but Renee and Pia go off together which angers Leah to no extent.
11	"Series Finale"	August 19, 2012	0.526
Nora's long battle to exhume her father comes to an end. Leah is unsure what to do when she is faced with heartbreaking news.

== International broadcast ==
In the UK it aired on ITVBe. In Australia the series premiered on Arena on May 2, 2015.
