= MTV Cribs =

American documentary television show

- Developed by: Nina L. Díaz
- Country of origin: United States
- Original language: English
- No. of seasons: 19
- No. of episodes: 113

Production
- Running time: 30 minutes
- Production company: MTV Productions

Original release
- Network: MTV (2000–2010, 2021–2023); Snapchat Discover (2016–2018); CMT (2009)
- Release: September 12, 2000 – 2010
- Release: June 3, 2017 – 2018
- Release: August 11, 2021 – December 20, 2023

MTV Cribs (also known as Cribs) is an American documentary television show that originated on MTV and features tours of the private homes of celebrities. It originally aired from 2000 to 2010. In 2017, MTV produced short-form episodes of the program and distributed it through Snapchat Discover. MTV revived the show for new full length episodes in 2021 through 2023.

== History ==
The first show aired in September 2000. By 2005, Cribs had featured tours of the homes of over 185 celebrities including musicians, actors, and athletes over the course of 13 seasons. The show was originally narrated by Ananda Lewis, then narrated by SuChin Pak (originally of MTV News).

It was developed by Nina L. Díaz. A short iteration on CMT was titled CMT Cribs. The most watched and replayed episode of Cribs was a special one-hour edition touring Mariah Carey's New York penthouse. In 2005/2006, MTV Canada produced a series of Canadian-made Cribs episodes. A new season of Cribs, filmed in high definition, started in August 2007 with a new format, title sequences, new narrator and on-screen graphics. A "Priciest Pads" special was created to kick off the new season, hosted by Kimora Lee Simmons.

The show was put into syndication in September 2008, to be offered by local television stations on a weekday basis in the United States by Litton Entertainment. However, the Litton versions of the program were severely edited and changed. Any references to MTV were scrubbed out, and the program received a new logo referring to it as just Cribs, while all music that was played in the original episodes was replaced by production music to avoid royalty fees. Although Lewis and Pak were still listed in the episode credits as narrators, all narration was stripped in the re-edited episodes, and 'coming up' segments were either silent or voiced by an uncredited announcer. The syndicated version was unsuccessful and offered in barter form, mainly on the lower-rated stations in many markets in abysmal timeslots, and in September 2009 was removed from the market.

On January 24, 2009, Cribs created a separate version specific to CMT (a sister network of MTV), dedicating itself to country music artists, stock car drivers and professional bullriders, and other southeastern U.S. culture figures. New episodes were taped to air on CMT with the CMT Cribs title. Also in 2009, the MTV format switched to Teen Cribs, which featured the homes of regular teenagers living in large and otherwise notable homes, straying away from the celebrity element.

The main MTV Cribs series restarted in September 2010 with repackaging and updates of its past visits including such celebrities as Hanson, Twiggy Ramirez and others. The main MTV Cribs series created and broadcast a few new episodes in late 2010 and early 2011, featuring the homes of Penn Jillette, Julie Benz and Manny Pacquiao, and others.

== Revival ==
The show was revived again for MTV as a short-form series with new episodes on Snapchat Discover beginning on June 3, 2017 with new episodes every Saturday for a number of weeks and the first episode featuring DJ Steve Aoki in his Las Vegas home. The revival was announced in April 2016 under former MTV president Sean Atkins. The first season was the highest rated premiere for a Snapchat Show ever and a second-season premiered mid-2018.

On July 14, 2021, it was announced that the show would be revived and include the homes of Martha Stewart, Big Sean, Rick Ross, Snooki, and other stars. It premiered on August 11 of that year and Pak returned as narrator. Season 19 aired on October 27, 2022.

== Show format ==
Producers decided not to include a host to make the show feel more intimate. Each 30-minute; documentary-style episodes begins with the celebrity opening the front door, introducing themselves, and saying, "welcome to my crib."

A steadicam follows the celebrity through the home and takes frequent close-ups to make the viewer feel like they are walking through the home themselves.

== Controversies ==
Several celebrities have either been accused of, or admitted to, using other people's property and claiming them as their own.

- In 2004, a lawsuit was brought against MTV by the real owner of Ja Rule's house alleging unauthorized taping of the interior and damage to the property caused by Ja Rule's partying.
- The first MTV Cribs episode with Robbie Williams showcased actress Jane Seymour's house as his home. In reality, Williams was renting the home from Seymour. In an episode of The Kumars at No. 42, Seymour confirmed that she owned the property. Williams later admitted the con and then showed off his real home in a later episode.
- 50 Cent's MTV Cribs episode showed him with three Ferraris (a yellow Enzo Ferrari, and red versions of the Ferrari F50 and Ferrari 599) with 50 Cent claiming they were his "whips". All three Ferraris were in fact owned by a private collector who lent out the vehicles for 50 Cent's Cribs episode and related music video work.
- Kim Kardashian's episode of MTV Cribs was not filmed at her home. The episode shows her mother's home in Hidden Hills and not Kim's home, which at the time of the episode's production was located in Beverly Hills.
- JoJo Levesque had her episode filmed at the home of an uncle, while she and her mother were transient, mostly staying within hotels and without a residence during her tours.

== Seasons ==
Season	Premier	Number of episodes	Reference
Season 1	September 20, 2000	7	
Season 2	February 8, 2001	5	
Season 3	June 26, 2001	3	
Season 4	January 9, 2002	9	
Season 5	June 5, 2002	7	
Season 6	October 14, 2002	8	
Season 7	January 22, 2003	5	
Season 8	October 6, 2003	7	
Season 9	January 5, 2004	5	
Season 10	July 20, 2004	5	
Season 11	March 8, 2005	12	
Season 12	August 4, 2005	7	
Season 13	July 30, 2006	6	
Season 14	April 22, 2007	4	
Season 15	August 2, 2007	10	
Season 16	July 27, 2008	13	
Season 17	October 30, 2009	8	
Season 18	August 11, 2021	8	
Season 19	October 27, 2022	28	

== Specials ==
Season	Premier	Episode	References
Season 6	October 21, 2002	Jackass Edition	
Season 7	February 5, 2003	B2K Edition	
Season 16	January 17, 2009	Teens Special	
