= Anthony Graziano =

American mobster (1940–2019)

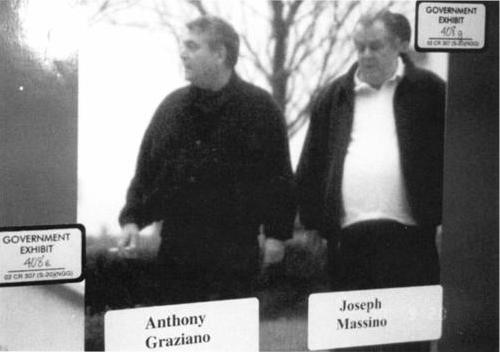
- FBI surveillance photo of Anthony Graziano and Joseph Massino
- Born: November 12, 1940; Staten Island, New York City, U.S.
- Died: May 25, 2019 (aged 78)
- Other names: T.G., The Little Guy
- Occupation: Mobster
- Children: 4, including Renee Graziano and Jennifer Graziano
- Allegiance: Bonanno crime family

Anthony A. Graziano (November 12, 1940 – May 25, 2019) was an American mobster and consigliere in the Bonanno crime family.

== Bonanno crime family ==
=== Captain ===
In 1990, Graziano pleaded guilty to federal tax evasion. He had failed to pay $100,000 to the Internal Revenue Service (IRS) and had hidden some personal assets under the names of relatives. Graziano was sentenced to five years in prison and fined $250,000.

In 1994, Graziano ordered his crew to find and kill John Pappa and Calvin Hennigar, both mobsters with the Colombo crime family. On one occasion, the two men had fired shots inside a topless bar in Staten Island owned by Graziano, wounding one patron. An enraged Graziano had sent his Brooklyn crew hunting for them. However, Graziano later met with Colombo family representatives and agreed on a settlement to the problem. Graziano called off the murder order, but in 2002 he would be indicted on two counts of murder conspiracy due to this episode.

=== Consigliere ===
In March 2002, Graziano was indicted on separate racketeering charges in New York, Arizona and Florida. In September 2012, Graziano was indicted on federal racketeering and extortion charges, bookmaking, and murder based on recorded conversations with his son-in-law Hector Pagan (Junior) Jr. and conspiracy to commit murder. On June 20, 2018, he was indicted again in Arizona on charges ranging from illegal gambling to investment fraud. His investment scams, carefully disguised by the once successful Bulls and Bears Fund, defrauded customers out of $11.7 million.

On July 18, 2003, Graziano was sentenced to 11 years in prison on the Florida charges. On November 13, 2003, Graziano was sentenced to nine years in prison on the New York charges. At the New York sentencing, Graziano's lawyer asked for leniency, saying that his client had diabetes and had survived two episodes of bladder cancer. In August 2011, Graziano was released from prison.

On May 25, 2019, Graziano died.

== Personal life ==
Graziano's daughter Renee Graziano participated in the reality television program Mob Wives. The show was created and produced by another daughter of Graziano, Renee's sister Jennifer Graziano. As a result, he did not speak to either of them for a few years. According to Renee Graziano during an interview on Dr. Drew's Podcast on April 24, 2013, she revealed that she and her father were speaking again. Renee also participated in the UK series Celebrity Big Brother 18, as well as WEtv's Marriage Boot Camp.

American Mafia
| Preceded by Anthony "Old Man" Spero as Consigliere | Bonanno crime family Acting consigliere (1999-2001); Consigliere (2001-present) | Incumbent |
