= Chris Grant (media executive) =

American media executive

Christopher Grant
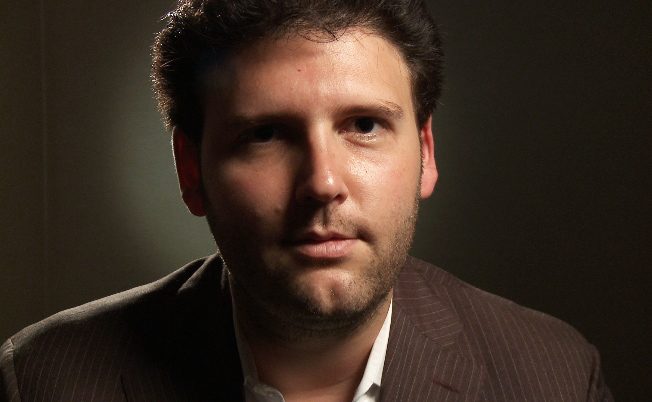
- Education: Carnegie Mellon University
- Occupations: CEO, Electus
- Spouse: Jenet Ricketts (2012–present)
- Children: 3

Christopher Grant is an American media executive who is the CEO/Co-Founder of Osmosis Global, an independent distribution company with offices in LA, NY and Toronto. Previously, Grant served as chief executive officer (CEO) for Electus, a division of IAC, and before that as President of Shine International.

== Career ==
Grant began his career in the mailroom at William Morris Agency. In 2002, Grant, with Ben Silverman, launched Reveille for which he became Managing Director. While there, he oversaw International Distribution and Creative Affairs, and was responsible for distributing all of Universal Television Group's formats overseas. The company was best known for such popular, award-winning series as The Biggest Loser,The Office, and Ugly Betty.

After Reveille was acquired by Shine in 2008, Grant launched and ran Shine International (now Banijay Endemol Shine) for Elisabeth Murdoch. The global sales and distribution label was responsible for distributing programming from the Shine Group of companies including Reveille, Kudos, Dragonfly, Princess Productions, Brown Eyed Boy, Shine TV, Shine France, Shine Germany, and Shine Australia, as well as Metronome, the Nordic region's leading production group. During Grant's tenure, Shine became one of the world's top television distributors, transforming such formats as MasterChef, The Biggest Loser, Are You Smarter Than A Fifth Grader?, and The Moment of Truth into global brands.

In 2011, Grant became CEO of Electus. At Electus, Grant was responsible for the company's growth across domestic and global television, digital and branded entertainment. Electus produced such series as Running Wild with Bear Grylls (NBC / Nat Geo), You vs Wild (Netflix), Food Fighters (NBC), Jane The Virgin (CW), The Toy Box (ABC), Flaked (Netflix), Marco Polo (Netflix), and Darkness (Discovery). Grant also oversaw the creation of Electus Digital, the digital creative and distribution arm of Electus comprising web properties such as CollegeHumor and production company Big Breakfast. His extensive collaborations with brands include innovative productions with Mattel, Procter & Gamble, Walmart, Macy's, Express, H&M and others.

In 2019, Grant launched Charlotte Street Studios, a full-service production company.

In 2023, Grant launched Osmosis Global, a distribution company backed by investor and entrepreneur Marc Pierce. Led by founder Chris Grant and president Eli Shibley, Osmosis is focused on distributing series and films, in addition to international coproductions and presales. Osmosis distributes titles from broadcasters and platforms such as Paramount+, Amazon Prime and A&E, as well as Nat Geo and The CW. Titles distributed by Osmosis include Kevin Costner Presents The First Christmas, Saving Yellowstone with Dennis Quaid, Somebody's Gotta Do It with Mike Rowe, True Tales of The Mob with Stevie Van Zandt, Stan Lee: The Final Chapter, and Scare Tactics among others.

== Recognition and affiliations ==
Grant was named one of Adweek's 20 Under 40 in 2013, has been profiled in The Hollywood Reporter’s Executive Suite and was named in their Top 30 Reality Players of 2015. Grant also was Co-Chair of the NATPE Board of Directors and is a member of the International Academy of Television Arts & Sciences.

Grant was nominated for an Emmy, along with the other executive producers, for You vs. Wild in 2019 and Running Wild with Bear Grylls in 2021. In 2022, he won an Emmy for You vs. Wild: Out Cold.

== Personal life ==
Grant lives in Connecticut. He is married to Jenet Marie Ricketts and has three children.

== Credits ==
Year	Production	Role
2008	All New Gladiators	Executive producer
2008-2009	Gladiators	Executive producer
2010	Gone Too Soon	Producer
2011	Charlie Sheen: Hollywood Black Book	Executive producer
2012	Chasing Gaga	Executive producer
2013-2015	Food Fighters	Executive producer
2012-2015	King of the Nerds	Executive producer
2013	Bet on Your Baby	Executive producer
2013	Dog and Beth: On the Hunt	Executive producer
2013	Maker Shack Agency	Executive producer
2014-2015	House of DVF	Executive producer
2014-2015	The Raft	Executive producer
2014-2015	Breaking Greenville	Executive producer
2014-present	Running Wild with Bear Grylls (Emmy Nominated)	Executive producer
2015	Marco Polo	Executive producer
2015-2016	Separation Anxiety	Executive producer
2015-2016	Winsanity	Executive producer
2013-2017	Southern Justice	Executive producer
2016-2017	Darkness	Executive producer
2016-2018	The Toy Box	Executive producer
2017-2018	Bear Grylls: Face The Wild	Executive producer
2018-2019	Wrong Man	Executive producer
2019-present	You vs. Wild (Emmy Nominated)	Executive producer
2021	Weekend Getaway	Executive producer
2022	You vs. Wild: Out Cold (Emmy Winner)	Executive producer
2026-present	Bear Grylls: Wild Reckoning	Executive producer
