= Kira Soltanovich =

American comedian, writer, and actress

- Кіра Солтанович
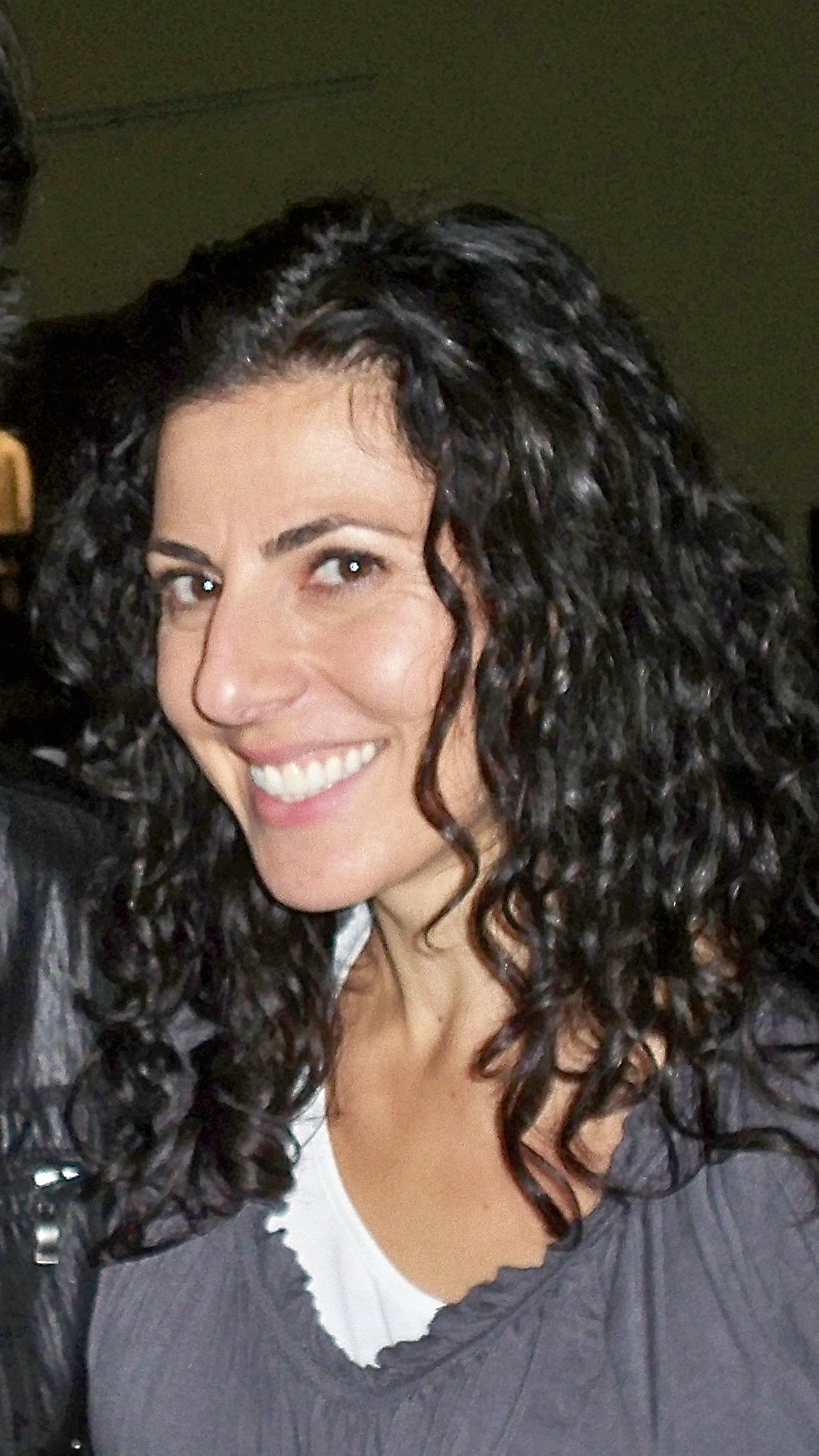
- Kira Soltanovich in 2010
- Born: Kira Soltanovych; Lviv, Ukrainian SSR, Soviet Union (now Ukraine)
- Occupations: Comedian, writer, actress

Kira Soltanovich (Note: Ukrainian: Кіра Солтанович, romanized: Kira Soltanovych) (/soʊlˈtɑːnəvɪtʃ/ sohl-TAH-nə-vitch; born in Lviv) is an American comedian, writer, and actress.

Soltanovich grew up in San Francisco and started performing stand-up in 1998. After graduating from San Diego State University with a degree in theater, she moved to Los Angeles to pursue comedy full-time.

Soltanovich is best known for her work on the prank-oriented reality show Girls Behaving Badly which aired on the Oxygen Network for four seasons and for being the voice of a talking photo booth in a sketch on The Tonight Show with Jay Leno, and The Jay Leno Show. She has performed stand-up on Jimmy Kimmel Live, Last Call with Carson Daly, Last Comic Standing, Hello Ross! and Comedy Central's The World Stands Up. Soltanovich has written for Joan Rivers and Scott Baio as well as for former Disney stars Selena Gomez and Justin Bieber (for the show PrankStars). Her three-year-old son inspired her podcast, The Kira Soltanovich Show, where she interviews fellow comedians who have kids and they discuss all things comedy and colic related.

In 2010, she appeared on the Showtime special Hot Tamales Live and in 2011, Soltanovich shot a half-hour comedy special titled Here Comes Trouble as part of the network's Laugh Out Loud Festival. In 2016, she released a new special, You Did This to Me which she self-produced and made while she was seven months pregnant. That same year, the game show Winsanity premiered with Soltanovich as its announcer.
