= List of Mob Wives episodes =

Mob Wives is an American reality television series that premiered on VH1 on April 17, 2011, concluding on March 16, 2016. The show follows the lives of several women residing in Staten Island, whose family members and husbands have been arrested and imprisoned for crimes that are connected to the American Mafia.

== Series overview ==
Season	Episodes	Originally released	
Season	Episodes	First released	Last released
1	11	April 17, 2011	July 10, 2011
2	19	January 1, 2012	May 27, 2012
3	14	January 6, 2013	April 21, 2013
4	13	December 5, 2013	February 27, 2014
5	14	December 3, 2014	March 18, 2015
6	11	January 13, 2016	March 16, 2016

== Episodes ==
=== Season 1 (2011) ===
No. overall	No. in season	Title	Original release date	US viewers (millions)
1	1	"Made in Staten Island"	April 17, 2011	1.42
In the Mob Wives series premiere, Karen Gravano, the daughter of Salvatore "Sammy The Bull" Gravano, returns to Staten Island after 10 years in Arizona.
2	2	"The Bitch is Back"	April 24, 2011	1.41
Drita gets news from prison. Karen and Renee clash at Carla's party.
3	3	"Mob Bust"	May 1, 2011	1.35
The Feds make a huge mob bust; Karen, Renee, and Drita's world is completely turned upside down.
4	4	"Do You Know Who I Am?"	May 8, 2011	1.20
Renee hosts a psychic party. Carla loses control of her twins and considers telling them about their father's incarceration.
5	5	"Unfinished Business"	May 15, 2011	1.18
Renee goes wild during a ladies' night out, and Drita comes to terms with having a husband in prison.
6	6	"Dumb or Stupid"	May 22, 2011	1.49
Karen and Drita continue to feud. Renee invites them to sit down and sort out their differences, tempers flare and everyone comes to blows.
7	7	"Total Chaos"	May 29, 2011	1.06
Carla and Renee fight, and Karen's and Drita's unresolved issues heat up. Meanwhile, Carla prepares for her husband's return from prison. Karen awaits a visit from her daughter, and Renee goes looking for love in all the wrong places.
8	8	"Relapses, Rats & Raccoons"	June 12, 2011	1.19
Karen's book deal makes news, and her progress on the book stalls. Drita tries to explain the concept of being a rat to her daughter. Carla prepares for her husband's release from prison.
9	9	"Take This Book & Shove it"	June 19, 2011	1.15
Carla's husband returns after 6 years in prison. Renee learns of Junior's deceit and faces a hard decision. Karen finishes the first chapter of her book and gives it to Drita, which stirs up an old animosity in Drita.
10	10	"Rumble On The Rooftop"	June 26, 2011	1.30
While Carla adjusts to life without a husband in jail, Renee is ready to turn a new page. Drita continues to steam about Karen's giving her the first chapter of her book and, when stunning revelations about Lee surface, Drita is pushed over the edge. When Drita attempts to lay it all out on the table during a sit-down with Karen and the other women, all hell breaks loose.
11	11	"Reunion"	July 10, 2011	1.87
Wendy Williams hosts the reunion that brings all the wives back together to discuss what happened during the season.

=== Season 2 (2012) ===
No. overall	No. in season	Title	Original release date	US viewers (millions)
12	1	"New Year. New War."	January 1, 2012	2.36
Renee is amped to finally get on the table for her full body makeover, but her "easy-fix" suddenly turns into her plastic surgery nightmare. Meanwhile, Drita and Carla are ready to dive into summer fun as newly single ladies. Karen finds a partner in crime in "Cousin" Ramona, and it's clear they are a force Drita will have to reckon with. Carla's lack of support during Renee's plastic surgery ordeal leads Renee to take drastic measures. After her near-death experience, Renee decides to plan a "Celebration of Life" party, but things get ugly when party goer and mob loyalist Big Ang attempts to get Karen and Drita to make amends. This episode marks the first appearance of Big Ang and Ramona
13	2	"Hell on Heels"	January 8, 2012	2.23
At Renee's "Celebration of Life" extravaganza and Drita's make-up talk with Karen takes a vicious turn, when Drita goes off. Drita is jumped by Karen & Ramona and the fight turns big & bloody. When rumors fly that it was a guy who threw the punch, the girl fight escalates into an all out mob brawl.The party is ruined & the dance floor & parking lot turns to battlefields. The next day, Junior finds out his sentence from last year's massive mob bust and we learn of new mob wife Ramona's infamous Mafia lineage. Meanwhile, Renee gets some news that rocks her world.
14	3	"Make-Ups and Break-Ups"	January 15, 2012	2.05
In the aftermath of Renee's "Celebration of Life" party, Renee takes up her issues with the ladies' violent behavior and sets out to confront Carla. Renee's "make-up mood" turns into a party of one, as the other women stand firm on opposing sides of the battlefield. Drita takes some serious steps to deal with life after Lee. After Junior's confession of love, Renee expects him to step up his game. After a night of partying with Karen, "cousin" Ramona goes missing.
15	4	"You Don't Wanna Go to War with Me!"	January 22, 2012	1.78
With Ramona in the mix, frenemy lines are fiercely drawn between the two camps of women. Drita has a burning desire to know whether Karen sucker -punched her at Renee's party. Meanwhile Ramona, just released from jail has to face the music when her boyfriend's arrest is splashed all over the local news. Carla and Drita are convinced that all bad roads lead back to Ramona. Renee and Jr. take their relationship to the next level at warp speed but Renee rages over his crummy habits. Karen & Carla sit down together to put their beef to rest, but things take a nasty turn when war is declared & the ladies get out of their seats. The girls ultimately make up but this new friendship might cause others to fall apart.
16	5	"Old Friends, New Archenemies"	January 29, 2012	1.97
As tensions flare between Ramona and Carla, Drita takes further steps to finalize her divorce. Drita is surprised to learn that Carla has called a truce with Karen. After her confrontation with Karen, Carla questions whether she can ever trust Karen's intentions. Renee finds herself caught in the crossfire between the two heated camps of women. Things come to a head when Renee is confronted by her suspicions about Ramona.
17	6	"Fights and Facials"	February 12, 2012	1.19
Renee's insecurities about Junior's past cheating ways start to resurface, and with Drita's help, Renee's curiosity leads to breaking into Junior's phone. Drita has her own issues to deal with, she needs to break the news to Aleeya about divorcing Lee. Karen's entrepreneurial spirit leads her to throw a spa party at Renee's house. A day of beauty turns ugly when Renee unleashes Ramona's wrath and pushes Ramona to confront "archenemy" Carla once and for all.
18	7	"Mob Daughters"	February 19, 2012	1.46
Unearthing old wounds proves to be a devastating journey for Renee. Carla reveals her close encounter with Ramona to Drita. After an intense couples counseling session, Renee faces the harsh realities that the fairytale life with Junior she's always dreamed of may be nothing but a nightmare. Karen is now promoting her book "Mob Daughter" and is forced to face hard and fast questions about her life. Ramona deals with boyfriend's facing jail time. Drita gets a surprise from Lee.
19	8	"Tricks or Treats?"	March 4, 2012	1.40
As Halloween descends on Staten Island, things get tricky when both Ramona and Drita plan bashes to celebrate on the same night. After an explosive couples counseling session, Renee and Junior are haunted by their past. Karen and Carla attempt to rekindle their friendship. When Renee and Carla are confronted with the dueling parties, they are once again faced with making decisions that may betray loyalties. Big Ang struggles with monkey business at her bar. While partying as Renee's partner in crime, Junior gets spooked.
20	9	"Cabin Fever"	March 11, 2012	1.16
The girls head to The Poconos for a few days of relaxation away from the pressures of life on the Island, leaving Drita behind to curb her temper with anger management. Fun activities like horseback riding and fishing keep the girls out of trouble, but not for long. An increasingly troubled Renee confronts Ramona about her remark that Junior married her to get close to her father. A peaceful dinner culminates in an explosive battle between Ramona and Renee. As Ramona calls Drita's loyalty into question, Carla is forced to defend her friend.
21	10	"Fire Away"	March 18, 2012	1.28
A night out in The Poconos erupts into a Staten Island-style smackdown as Renee calls for back-up. After Renee storms out of the bar, headed back to Staten Island, Carla is left alone with "team" Karen and the shenanigans continue. The Poconos adventure ends with a bang when the wives hit a local pistol range and fire away. Back in Staten Island, Drita lands a sexy modeling gig and recruits Big Ang for a day of spray tanning. Ramona deals with the harsh realities of prison visits as Carla's husband, Joe, is released and finally becomes a free man.
22	11	"Torn Apart"	March 25, 2012	1.26
Carla helps Drita step into the world of dating normal men, while Big Ang questions her own relationship with her estranged 9-5 husband. Renee starts to crack under the pressure of Junior's impending return to prison. Then, when she receives some shocking news, her entire world starts to crumble. Just when she thought things couldn't get any worse, another horrifying revelation leaves her shattered.
23	12	"The Ultimate Betrayal"	April 1, 2012	1.39
Just as Renee swallows the bitter pill of losing both Junior and her Father to jail, explosive rumors surrounding Junior's surrender run wild throughout the streets of Staten Island. Drita plans a visit to Lee in prison, while Big Ang tries cheer Renee up by taking her to an over-the-top drag show. But the laughter dies down when a shocking Internet story reveals the truth about Junior, forever changing life as Renee and the rest of the women know it.
24	13	"What Goes Around"	April 15, 2012	1.32
The rumors that have everyone on Staten Island chirping hit the New York Post, confirming that Junior is a "rat" and has been wearing a wire on Renee's father. As Renee tries to find her bearings, her paranoia about what people think about her ignites a new feud with Carla. Karen receives advice and support from a true "mob wife", her mother Debbie, while a recording session for her audio book leaves her in tears. Drita struggles to reconcile her love of fighting with being a good example for her children.
25	14	"If Books Could Kill"	April 22, 2012	1.58
As Karen prepares for her book release party, she's left to face some harsh critics from her past, while Drita is once again forced to deal with the idea that she and Lee might be in the book. Carla and Renee finally confront each other over Carla's implication that Renee knew that Junior was wearing a wire. Ramona tries to recover hundreds of thousands of dollars of jewelry that was confiscated by the Feds during her boyfriend's arrest, and Christmastime means one thing to Big Ang -- party time. Meanwhile a new mob bust rocks Renee and the rest of Staten Island when five more men are arrested as a result of Junior's cooperation.
26	15	"Taking the Rap"	April 29, 2012	1.29
As Renee deals with the fallout of her father's taking the rap and Junior's betrayal, she becomes determined to get Karen and Drita to resolve their differences. Big Ang conspires with her on this "mission impossible" but is on her own mission to beautify herself. Drita gets shocking news regarding Lee's release from prison and begins to realize her hip hop dreams when she gets cast in French Montana video. Karen opens a spa to put down more permanent roots in New York but is torn when daughter Karina is not on the same page, and Ramona and Renee are not able to offer the help she expected.
27	16	"Of Dogs and Men"	May 6, 2012	1.35
While Karen and Drita both contemplate Renee's request to resolve their differences, Karen reveals to Ramona that she is actually considering it. When Renee goes on the radio show Locked Down Love, she finally goes public with her demons and even more shocking details about Junior's betrayal. In typical fashion, Big Ang spends a day spoiling her son AJ, and Drita receives a crushing letter from her husband, Lee. Carla is worried that her husband, Joe, has suddenly become distant and is stunned to learn about his whereabouts when she finally confronts him. When Karen tries to convince Karina's father, Dave, to move to NYC, sparks fly.
28	17	"Omerta"	May 13, 2012	1.23
Both Karen and Drita are on edge as they prepare for their monumental meeting, leaving the rest of the women wondering if fists will fly once again. And when Karen and Drita finally meet, they both refuse to back down. Renee decides to purge the negative energy that has permeated her life and home -- through a spiritual healer. Ramona heads to a psychic to gain clarity about the men in her past, present, and most of all, her future. After getting a special tattoo, Big Ang throws a big dinner to bring everyone together like the old days, but tensions rise as the ladies find themselves all in the same room for the first time this season.
29	18	"Reunion: Part 1"	May 20, 2012	1.19
The ladies of Mob Wives reunite to talk about the show's second season with host Joy Behar. The ladies clash, and things get heated between Ramona and Carla. Renee, Karen and Big Ang are left to defuse the situation when Joy can't even get in a word, and the reunion stage turns into a battlefield.
30	19	"Reunion: Part 2"	May 28, 2012	0.92
The physical altercation between Ramona and Drita continues. The ladies continue to talk, and things remain tense.

=== Season 3 (2013) ===
No. overall	No. in season	Title	Original release date	US viewers (millions)
31	1	"Mob Knives"	January 6, 2013	1.83
Renee receives a letter from Junior and fears she and AJ are being targeted. Drita and Big Ang attempt to settle an ongoing feud between Carla and Renee. This episode marks the first appearance of Love
32	2	"Bad Boys"	January 13, 2013	1.39
Joe's newest girlfriend is introduced to Carla, and the duo explain their serious relationship. Drita is unsure whether to take her kids to visit their father, Lee, in prison.
33	3	"Threats and Thongs"	January 20, 2013	1.07
Renee is in shock after she opens a malicious letter from Junior. Ramona is scared about her boyfriends upcoming court appearance.
34	4	"Of Vice and Men"	January 27, 2013	1.47
Drita decides that it's time to go visit Lee in prison with their daughters. Carla goes on with her life while Joe is preparing to terminate his marriage with Carla.
35	5	"The Gathering Storm"	February 10, 2013	0.63
Renee has a difficult time in rehab due to her being unable to control her anger. Ramona confronts Drita over a birthday party invitation.
36	6	"After the Storm"	February 17, 2013	0.84
The wives come together after the destruction of Hurricane Sandy as they help their fellow neighbors and themselves.
37	7	"No Love Lost"	February 24, 2013	1.03
Drita tells everyone the details about Lee's surprise release from prison. Ramona and Karen receive the news about Lee's return. Renee returns from rehab. Love continues to go for Carla, leaving the other ladies shocked.
38	8	"Time and Punishment"	March 3, 2013	1.06
Karen falls in love with her studio partner. Ramona tells everyone about her secret engagement.
39	9	"Mama Drama"	March 10, 2013	0.92
Big Ang hosts a Christmas party but drama engulfs the party. Renee goes shopping for a security dog. Ramona and Karen come together in order to confront Carla.
40	10	"Desert Storm"	March 17, 2013	0.93
Karen works to reopen her father's case. Big Ang informs Drita about Love's vendetta with Carla. Drita tells the news to her friend.
41	11	"Winging It"	March 24, 2013	0.77
Karen's relationship starts to become serious. Renee's newest business venture takes off. Love informs Drita about her problems with Carla. Drita and Ang later tell Carla the information.
42	12	"Crazy Love"	March 31, 2013	0.94
Carla reveals shocking news. Drita interviews to hire staff for her new store. Karen hosts a pre-nup party to educate the ladies about protecting their assets.
43	13	"Love Hurts"	April 7, 2013	1.47
Ramona tells the ladies about her wedding plans. Love and Carla come face-to-face at Drita's '80s party which turns ugly. Note:Love is removed from the show after physically attacking Carla Note:Karen, Carla and Ramona voluntarily leave the show
44	14	"The Reunion"	April 21, 2013	1.07
Dr. Drew sits down with the wives to discuss the altercation between Love and Carla. Karen and Ramona reveal the reasons they despise Carla.

=== Season 4: New Blood (2013–14) ===
No. overall	No. in season	Title	Original release date	US viewers (millions)
45	1	"Season Premiere"	December 5, 2013	1.31
In the fourth season premiere, newest cast member Alicia DiMichele Garofalo hosts a 1920s inspired costume party. Drita, Renee, and Ang all attend to support Alicia while both she and her husband — Eddie "Tall Guy" Garofalo — await sentencing. Back home, Drita is balancing her family while still taking care of her business. Ang is content with her life but wants to be a mother again. Renee is preparing to launch her fashion line, and hires Natalie Guerico — who runs a family funeral home in South Philadelphia and is friends with Alicia — to model for her. Drita, Ang, and Natalie all meet up but Natalie rubs them the wrong way with her antics. Note:Alicia replaces Karen Note:Natalie replaces Carla
46	2	"Caught on Tape"	December 12, 2013	0.96
Natalie is angry to learn that Drita has been talking behind her back and decides to confront her about it. Meanwhile Alicia accuses Renee of being on wire tapes recording conversations between her husband and others.
47	3	"You Smell Delicious"	December 19, 2013	1.10
Alicia is distraught after Eddie's betrayal on his federal surveillance tapes and goes to the ladies to help her cope. Drita's store, children, and Lee's home renovation is becoming too much for her to handle. Big Ang and her son discuss their growing family. Renee works on her friendship with Natalie and her friends back on Staten Island. Renee also has a new man in her life, and brings him out to introduce him to the group and becomes pissed when Natalie is too friendly.
48	4	"Vegas — Part 1"	December 26, 2013	1.14
Drita's home life starts to get rocky. Alicia showcases some of the items from her boutiques at Philadelphia Fashion Week. All of the ladies decide to leave their stress behind and take a girls trip to Las Vegas
49	5	"Vegas — Part 2"	January 2, 2014	1.39
While still in Vegas, the group tries to have Renee and Natalie reconcile but it takes a turn for the worse when the two women come to blows. Drita goes to the casino in an attempt to win back the money she lost.
50	6	"Vegas — Part 3"	January 9, 2014	1.47
The ladies go to a strip club. The beef between Renee and Natalie hangs a dark cloud over the girls trip. Drita has to tell Lee how much money she's lost. Alicia receives news about Eddie's sentencing.
51	7	"Loose Lips"	January 16, 2014	1.44
Alicia is attacked in the tabloids, which leads to her pointing the finger at other ladies, specifically Renee, in the group over the information leak. Ang, Drita, and Renee attempt to support Alicia.
52	8	"Eat Worms B***h"	January 23, 2014	1.25
Drita has the chance to write a song inspired by her life. Natalie tells her boyfriend London that he needs to make a decision on where their relationship is going. Renee is still annoyed over Alicia's accusations but things get worse once Renee receives a letter from Junior. Alicia and Renee have a sit down to discuss their issues where things continue to decline.
53	9	"Purgatory"	January 30, 2014	1.18
Natalie invites all the ladies to her Halloween party at the funeral home. Ang and Neil continue to discuss having another child. Drita gets a surprise visit from Method Man while working on her new song.
54	10	"Life Sentences"	February 6, 2014	1.21
Alicia awaits the outcome of Eddie's sentencing. Renee meets with her lawyer to discuss the letter she received from Junior. Natalie and Renee meet to discuss their fall out in Las Vegas. Drita invites all the girls to lunch, where not all the ladies show up; that prompts Drita to plan another get together at her house.
55	11	"Renee's Had Enough"	February 13, 2014	1.15
Drita's dinner party takes a turn for the worse once Renee blames Alicia's insecurity for their problems. Drita continues to work on her second store to meet the deadline for her grand opening. Big Ang and Neil begin to visit doctors to explore their options for having another child. Alicia starts planning for her sentencing. Natalie and London go apartment hunting in New York but end up in an argument.
56	12	"Season Finale"	February 20, 2014	1.31
Renee tells all the ladies that she is composing an erotic novel. Natalie debuts her song, titled Delicious, at Renee's book release party. Alicia's sentencing has arrived.
57	13	"The Reunion"	February 27, 2014	0.95
The ladies of the fourth season sit down with Sherri Shepherd to discuss what went down.

=== Season 5: Trust No One (2014–15) ===
No. overall	No. in season	Title	Original release date	US viewers (millions)
58	1	"The Realest B... Is Back"	December 3, 2014	1.16
Renee is upset when Drita and Big Ang turn their backs on her and hang out with Natalie. Natalie reveals what Renee has said about the girls which causes Big Ang and Drita to fly off the handle. Karen Gravano returns to Staten Island.
59	2	"Drunken Monkey Business"	December 10, 2014	0.84
Drita decides to sit down with Renee to hash out their issues but new information shifts Drita's anger towards Natalie. At Big Ang's 7th anniversary party for her bar, the Drunken Monkey, Natalie and Karen dish their beef they have with each other, which turns into a heated argument.
60	3	"Storm A-Brewin'"	December 17, 2014	1.11
Big Ang's party is the setting for a continuing showdown between Karen and Natalie. Meanwhile, Karen discovers unsettling news about her boyfriend, and Drita meets the new addition to Ang's family.
61	4	"RATalie"	January 7, 2015	1.05
Natalie moves to New York and goes deeper into the Staten Island circle. Meanwhile, Renee tries to rebuild her relationships with the crew, yet alliances may be broken when Drita discovers information about Natalie.
62	5	"Digging Up Dirt"	January 14, 2015	0.72
The relationship between Renee and Ang is tarnished after Junior testifies against Ang's cousin. Renee's son ends up in the hospital. After Ang and Drita confront Natalie about what Nat D. said, Natalie decides to do some digging on her.
63	6	"Philly vs. Philly"	January 21, 2015	1.03
Big Ang and Renee fighting is brought to the boiling point when Karen brings them on a boat to resolve the conflict they end up ending the feud but they all find out one by one that Natalie is not trustworthy. Meanwhile Big Ang works on her house.
64	7	"The Anti-Social Network"	January 28, 2015	1.10
Big Ang talks to Natalie G. who claims Karen hacked her mother's Facebook page. Meanwhile Karen grows upset when her daughter is brought into the feud between her and Natalie. Also Big Ang has a few days to fix the house and sell it. The girls meet to settle the score between Karen and Natalie but it quickly turns violent.
65	8	"Staten Island Sea Hags"	February 4, 2015	1.25
Renee grows irritated when she finds out that Junior has been in contact with AJ and is shocked to find out about his sentencing. Nat D. reveals that Natalie has been talking about the girls behind their backs. Karen decides to open up a medical marijuana dispensary in Arizona.
66	9	"Forgive and Fuggedaboutit"	February 11, 2015	1.14
Drita and Ang separately confront Natalie about the accusations that Nat D. made about her. Karen is upset when her ex doesn't want to spend time with their daughter. Renee holds a one-year anniversary party for Mob Candy and invites former nemesis Carla, which surprisingly doesn't sit well with Drita. Ang holds an early Thanksgiving party for the girls so that Renee and Natalie can make up.
67	10	"Deck the Brawls"	February 18, 2015	1.01
Nat D. hosts a Christmas party and invites the girls but gets sour when Drita doesn't show up. Renee continues to reconnect with Carla and invites her to Nat D's party. Natalie Guercio and London attend couple's therapy.
68	11	"Baptisms and Betrayals"	February 25, 2015	1.18
Drita is sick of hearing that Nat D is talking about her not showing up to her party and later decides to meet with her. Nat D shows Drita evidence that Natalie Guercio is a rat. Renee decides to start fresh and get baptized. Karen continues her efforts to get her father released early.
69	12	"The Final Face-off"	March 4, 2015	1.29
Renee has a party in celebration of her cleansing. Drita finds out the truth about Natalie G talking about Renee, Drita and Ang. Nat D gets everybody to roll on Natalie G with a surprise.
70	13	"Reunion: Part 1"	March 11, 2015	1.07
Vivica A. Fox sits down with the wives at the season five reunion. Natalie G gets rolled on by few of the ladies. London backs his girlfriend but Storm, Karen's boyfriend, steps in with his views on the word "Rat".
71	14	"Reunion: Part 2"	March 18, 2015	0.80
Nat D and Carla appears on the reunion stage. Natalie G leaves the reunion stage after a run-in with Nat D and disputing controversial comments about Karen's Daughter, Karina's father.

=== Season 6: The Last Stand (2016) ===
No. overall	No. in season	Title	Original release date	US viewers (millions)
72	1	"Mobbed Up Mermaids"	January 13, 2016	1.32
After sending the Philly girls packing, the ladies of the original Staten Island crew are finally at peace. But when a new girl threatens to disrupt their newfound tranquility the group is faced with some difficult decisions. Note:Brittany replaces Natalie Guercio Note:Marissa replaces Natalie DiDonato
73	2	"Cabin in the Woods"	January 13, 2016	1.36
Drita is forced to defend herself when she hears the allegations from the Mermaid Parade. Karen and Storm face difficult decisions. Renee brings a friend into the circle and quickly shakes things up on a girls' weekend.
74	3	"Hamptons Hangover"	January 20, 2016	1.19
As Drita finds herself on the outs with her longtime friends, she quickly discovers an alliance with Brittany. While Renee tries to convince her son AJ to move back home, Ang's reckless choices of the past continue to haunt her.
75	4	"Flip-Floppers and Party Hoppers"	January 27, 2016	1.12
Ang gives Neil an ultimatum. While tensions between Drita and Carla run high, Karen continues to deal with her father's critics. Marissa voices her strong opinions about Brittany's newfound friendship with Drita.
76	5	"The Sitdown"	February 3, 2016	0.97
Tired of the drama, Ang gathers the five main girls for an old-fashioned sitdown. Renee works to convince her son and his girlfriend to move in with her. Karen finds herself in the middle of a feud between Brittany and Marissa.
77	6	"Younger Version of the Same Old BS"	February 10, 2016	1.14
Loyalties are called into question after Marissa and Brittany wage war on each other forcing the other women to take sides. Drita seeks out inspiration for her book, as well as Lee's blessing. Ang gets some unexpected news.
78	7	"Exes and Whys"	February 17, 2016	1.22
Ang receives devastating news that exposes her relationship issues with Neil. Elsewhere, Brittany forms a stronger alliance with Drita due to her feelings about Ranee and Carla; and a rumor brings back an old feud between Drita and Karen.
79	8	"Cuts Both Ways"	February 24, 2016	1.25
The war between Karen and Drita reaches irreparable heights when Brittany relays an explosive rumor. The women work to cheer Ang up as she faces yet another life threatening surgery. Renee takes up a new hobby.
80	9	"Drittany"	March 2, 2016	1.05
Karen works to squash the feud between Brittany, Carla and Renee. Big Ang's future hangs in the balance as she waits to find out if her cancer has spread. Drita hears a rumor that may destroy her relationship with Karen forever.
81	10	"What's Done Is Done"	March 9, 2016	1.25
Drita continues to steam after hearing Karen's verbal attack and calls for a final meeting with Karen and Marissa to settle their differences. Big Ang continues to have health issues, related to her cancer. Insults are immediately thrown between Karen, Drita, Marissa, and Brittany, leading to a physical altercation and no hope for peace.
82	11	"The Final Sitdown"	March 16, 2016	1.13
Drita and Karen come together to settle old scores and Big Ang makes a heartfelt appearance in the midst of her intensive cancer treatment.
