= Mob Wives =

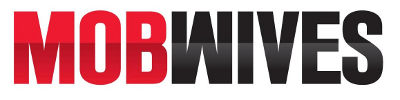
- Also known as: Mob Wives: New Blood (season 4); Mob Wives: Trust No One (season 5); Mob Wives: The Last Stand (season 6)
- Genre: Reality True crime
- Created by: Jennifer Graziano
- Starring: Drita D'Avanzo; Carla Facciolo; Karen Gravano; Renee Graziano; Angela Raiola
- Theme music composer: Rock Mafia (seasons 1–3); Deap Vally (seasons 4–6)
- Opening theme: "The Big Bang" (seasons 1–3); "Baby I Call Hell" (seasons 4–6)
- Country of origin: United States
- Original language: English
- No. of seasons: 6
- No. of episodes: 82 (list of episodes)

Production
- Executive producers: Jennifer Graziano; Bob Weinstein; Harvey Weinstein; David Glasser; Meryl Poster; Ben Silverman; Jimmy Fox; Banks Tarver; Ken Druckerman; Nina L. Diaz; Susan Levison; Shelly Tatro; Kari McFarland; Rick Hankey
- Running time: 40–43 minutes
- Production companies: Electus; The Weinstein Company; Left/Right Productions; Just Jenn Productions

Original release
- Network: VH1
- Release: April 17, 2011 – March 16, 2016

Related
- Mob Wives Chicago; Mob Wives: The Sit Down; Big Ang; Miami Monkey

Mob Wives is an American reality television series that premiered on VH1 on April 17, 2011. The show focuses on the lives of several women residing in the New York City borough of Staten Island, whose family members and husbands have been arrested and imprisoned for crimes that are connected to the Italian-American Mafia.

The success of the show has resulted in several spin-offs, including Mob Wives: The Sit Down, Mob Wives Chicago, Big Ang and Miami Monkey.

== Overview ==
The show focuses on the lives of several women residing in the New York City borough of Staten Island, whose family members and husbands have been arrested and imprisoned for crimes that are connected to the American Mafia.

=== Season 1 ===
The first season premiered on April 17, 2011. Drita D'Avanzo, Carla Facciolo, Karen Gravano and Renee Graziano were introduced as the main cast.

=== Season 2 ===
The second season premiered on January 1, 2012, with Angela "Big Ang" Raiola and Ramona Rizzo joining the cast.

On May 9, 2012, VH1 announced that the series had been renewed for a third season.

On August 12, 2012, Graziano tweeted that filming was underway for the third season.

It was announced on December 11, 2012 that the third season would debut on January 6, 2013 with new cast member Love Majewski.

=== Season 3 ===
The third season premiered on January 6, 2013, with Love Majewski joining the cast.

On May 14, 2013, Graziano revealed that the show had been renewed for a fourth season, although it had not been officially announced by VH1 at the time.

In an interview during New York Fashion Week, Rizzo mentioned that she, Gravano, and Facciolo would not be returning for the fourth season.

=== Season 4 (Mob Wives: New Blood) ===
The fourth season premiered on December 5, 2013, with Alicia DiMichele and Natalie Guercio joining the cast.

On February 19, 2014, VH1 renewed the show for a fifth season, which began production in mid-2014.

Gravano confirmed through numerous tweets that she would be returning for the fifth season.

=== Season 5 (Mob Wives: Trust No One) ===
The fifth season premiered on December 3, 2014, with Karen Gravano returning to the main cast. Natalie DiDonato joining the cast in a recurring capacity. Victoria Gotti also made a special guest appearance. Facciolo made guest appearances.

On December 7, 2015, VH1 announced their decision to end the show as the conclusion of its sixth season, known as Mob Wives: The Last Stand.

=== Season 6 (Mob Wives: The Last Stand) ===
The sixth and final season premiered on January 13, 2016, with Brittany Fogarty and Marissa Jade joining the cast, both in recurring capacities. Majewski made guest appearances.

On February 18, 2016, less than a month before the final season concluded, Angela "Big Ang" Raiola died from complications of throat cancer and pneumonia.

== Cast ==
=== Timeline of cast ===
Wives	Seasons					
Wives	1	2	3	4	5	6
	Main cast members					
Drita D'Avanzo	Main					
Carla Facciolo	Main				Guest	Main
Karen Gravano	Main				Main	
Renee Graziano	Main					
Angela Raiola		Main				
Ramona Rizzo		Main				
Love Majewski			Main			Guest
Alicia DiMichele				Main		
Natalie Guercio				Main		
	Supporting cast members					
Natalie DiDonato					Recurring	
Brittany Fogarty						Recurring
Marissa Jade						Recurring

=== Cast ===
- Drita D'Avanzo, wife of Lee D'Avanzo
- Carla Facciolo, ex-wife of Joseph Ferragamo
- Karen Gravano, daughter of Salvatore "Sammy the Bull" Gravano
- Renee Graziano, daughter of Anthony Graziano and ex-wife of Hector Pagan Jr.
- Angela "Big Ang" Raiola, niece of Salvatore "Sally Dogs" Lombardi
- Ramona Rizzo, granddaughter of Benjamin "Lefty Guns" Ruggiero
- Love Majewski, ex-girlfriend of Chris Paciello
- Alicia DiMichele, wife of Eddie Garofalo Jr.
- Natalie Guercio, in a relationship with London Rene
- Natalie DiDonato, cousin of Frankie Flowers
- Brittany Fogarty, daughter of John Fogarty
- Marissa Jade, in a relationship with Jamie "OZ" Lansburg

== Episodes ==
Season	Episodes	Originally released	
Season	Episodes	First released	Last released
1	11	April 17, 2011	July 10, 2011
2	19	January 1, 2012	May 27, 2012
3	14	January 6, 2013	April 21, 2013
4	13	December 5, 2013	February 27, 2014
5	14	December 3, 2014	March 18, 2015
6	11	January 13, 2016	March 16, 2016

=== Spin-offs ===
- Mob Wives Chicago debuted on June 10, 2012.
- Big Ang, Raiola's own spin-off show, premiered on July 8, 2012.
- Miami Monkey, the third Mob Wives spin-off, premiered September 8, 2013.

Jennifer Graziano announced in October 2012 that Mob Wives Miami, Mob Wives Pittsburgh, and Mob Wives Philadelphia had both been cast, but VH1 never green-lit either project.

=== Reboot ===
Jennifer Graziano, creator and executive producer of Mob Wives, stated in December 2017 that a reboot of Mob Wives was in the works. Drita D'Avanzo, who starred on the show during its original run, declined Graziano's invitation to return, stating that she had since moved on and wanted to explore other ventures. According to Graziano, most of the original cast were willing to return, including her sister Renee, who also starred on all seasons of the show. The show was set to be filmed on the East Coast and would likely feature both original and new cast members.

In December 2018, Graziano hinted of a potential reboot.

Despite a response issued from Renee Graziano about a 2021 premiere, a source close to VH1 confirmed that a reboot of the show was eventually dismissed within weeks of initial discussions back in 2017, citing declining viewership of its original run and a rise of popular programming currently airing on the network.

== Reception ==
The first season of Mob Wives was well received by some entertainment critics. Entertainment Weekly's television critic Ken Tucker praised the show in his review, stating, "As someone who's watched at least a few episodes of every version of the Real Housewives franchise and feels a bit nauseous about it, I didn't come to Mob Wives with high hopes. But this floridly funny, vicariously vicious reality series exerts a vulgar charm." He noted the fascination of watching excessively made-up people living in apparent luxury and the authenticity of the drama among the women. "By turns funny, appalling, and frightening, Mob Wives is swiftly paced, reality-TV at its most effusively dismaying." The Hollywood Reporter critic David Knowles felt the show was significantly better than typical reality TV. He found the women's internal conflict between their mob past and their desire to break free from that lifestyle to be the underlying question of the series. Knowles noted that the women's storylines are so tense and engrossing that the surveillance-style effect used to introduce them seemed unnecessarily cliché. "As we learned from The Sopranos, the wives and children of mafiosos can be every bit as compelling as the gangsters themselves... As for those other real housewives franchises, their endless squabbles and social climbing antics are rendered rather trivial after you watch the first five minutes of Mob Wives."

Some New York critics were less enthusiastic about the show. David Hinckley's New York Daily News review complained the "tired concept, is so bad it should sleep with fishes", and observed "these are unpleasant people in an unwatchable show". On the other hand, he wrote: "Now it could be added that if this is what you want on TV, Mob Wives is an all-you-can-eat buffet. Imagine the angriest of the "Real Housewives" ratcheted up into overdrive". Staten Island Advance's SILive.com "Entertainment Comment of the Day" in April 2011 said, "Out of interest we only watched about twenty minutes of the first episode and couldn't stomach watching the second. We don't know what's so interesting about a bunch of low-life women (the one pictured is a real piece of work) who think that husbands that go off to prison is like spending a year at college. I bet their kids are real proud of them. Any glorification of a life of crime is pathetic. They all deserve whatever misery that comes along".

The Mafia theme of the show was a concern for some non-journalists, as well. Staten Island Borough President James Molinaro stated; "I've seen it – It's disgraceful. It paints Staten Island and Italian-Americans in a bad light. It's detrimental because people will think this is what Staten Island is made of. I'm Italian – and this is bad for our doctors, our lawyers, the people who came from Italy to build their lives". UNICO National, an Italian advocacy group, said the show is tantamount to "trash TV like Jersey Shore. I hope it dies because no one watches it. We were mobsters and mafiosos with The Sopranos, bimbos and buffoons with Jersey Shore, and now we're back where we started. It's a disgrace". Gawker.com said, "This seems like a terrible idea for a reality show! Would anyone watch a show called Mass Murderers' Wives?"

Relatives of murder victims killed by the cast members' relatives are also disturbed by the show. Jackie Colucci, whose brother Joseph was murdered by Sammy "The Bull" Gravano in 1970, stated about Karen Gravano: "She should be ashamed that her father is a murderer and a drug dealer. I would be ashamed and crawling in a hole and staying out of the limelight".
