= MTV Entertainment Studios =

American film and television production company

Showtime/MTV Entertainment Studios
- Final corporate logo used from 2024 to 2025
- Formerly: MTV Productions (1991–95); MTV Films (1996–2020); MTV Production Development (2003–18); MTV Studios (2018–21); MTV Entertainment Studios (2021–25)
- Type: Subsidiary
- Industry: Motion pictures; Television production
- Predecessor: Showtime Networks; MTV Entertainment Studios
- Founded: 1991; 35 years ago
- Defunct: August 7, 2025; 15 months ago
- Fate: Merged with Skydance Television and folded into Paramount Television Studios.
- Successors: Paramount Television Studios (TV library); Paramount Players (film library)
- Headquarters: Hollywood, Los Angeles, California, U.S.
- Owner: Skydance Corporation
- Parent: MTV Entertainment Group
- Divisions: MTV Animation; MTV Documentary Films

Showtime/MTV Entertainment Studios (also known as MTV Entertainment Studios and formerly MTV Production Development from 2003 until 2018 and MTV Studios from 2018 until 2021) was an American film and television production and distribution company and was the film and television production arm of the MTV Entertainment Group, itself a subsidiary of the Paramount Media Networks division of Skydance. It primarily produces content aimed at adolescent and adult audiences, including original productions for the namesake cable channel and its siblings, or theatrical films released through Paramount Pictures.

MTV Entertainment Studios was formed in 2021 as a consolidation of the original MTV Productions founded in 1991, the former MTV Films group established in 1996, the MTV Production Development/MTV Studios group of 2003, and the relaunched MTV Studios of 2018.

In 2023, MTV Entertainment Studios merged with fellow Paramount subsidiary Showtime's production businesses internally to become Showtime/MTV Entertainment Studios and in 2025 was consolidated into a revived Paramount Television Studios.

Now, MTV Entertainment Studios is a in-name-only-label of Paramount Television Studios.

== History ==
=== MTV Productions ===
MTV Productions was founded in 1991. It went into expansion two years later, with Doug Herzog serving as president, to produce content for theatrical releases, broadcast television and cable, syndication, and the international marketplace. MTV then signed a two-picture deal with Geffen Pictures. MTV Productions also tried for an entertainment strip called Real Time, to be distributed by Viacom Enterprises, and scheduled on air for the 1994–95 season, but never materialized.

Joe's Apartment, based on a short aired on MTV, would be the only film to come out of the Geffen Film deal due to the 1994 acquisition of Paramount Pictures by MTV's parent company Viacom. It was later released on July 26, 1996, and grossed $4.6 million on a $13 million budget, making it a box office bomb. Since its acquisition by Viacom, Paramount Pictures began to distribute material from MTV and Nickelodeon. After The Arsenio Hall Show was cancelled, Paramount began distributing and producing MTV's The Jon Stewart Show for the syndication market.

The Paramount Television Group and MTV Productions signed a deal to develop projects commissioned by MTV in 1994, and gave Paramount the right of first refusal on projects developed by MTV.

In the 1997–98 television season, MTV Productions, in conjunction with Paramount Network Television, debuted the NBC comedy Jenny, the UPN (then-sister of MTV) comedy Hitz, and the WB drama Three. None of these lasted more than one season. In 1999, MTV Productions contributed another network series to ABC, Making the Band, ABC's association ended in 2001.

=== MTV Films ===
Logo from 2010 to 2013

Final logo as MTV Films

By 1995, David Gale was named head of MTV Films.

MTV developed its first feature film in collaboration with Paramount Pictures, Beavis and Butt-Head Do America. Based on MTV's animated series Beavis and Butt-Head, the film grossed $63.1 million on a $12 million budget.

On August 21, 1998, MTV Films released Dead Man on Campus, which starred Tom Everett Scott and Mark-Paul Gosselaar. It got negative reviews, and was a box office bomb, grossing $15.1 million on a $14 million budget. MTV Films' next feature project, 200 Cigarettes, released on February 26, 1999, and was also a box office bomb, grossing $6.8 million on a $6 million budget.

In 2001, Zoolander was released under the VH1 Films label, and grossed $60.7 million on a $28 million budget.

On August 21, 2006, Nickelodeon Movies, Comedy Central Films, and MTV Films became labels of the Paramount Motion Pictures Group. Less than eleven years later, Paramount Players was created in 2017 as a division of Paramount's Motion Pictures Group and it consists of MTV Films, Nickelodeon Movies, and BET Films.

=== Relaunch and consolidation ===
In June 2018, MTV announced it had rebranded its production & development division MTV Production Development and had it relaunched as a newly production unit dedicated to produce programming for other networks & streaming services alongside producing revivals from the MTV programming library under the name MTV Studios, the newly rebranded production division would develop & produce revivals or re-imaginings of classic series from MTV's programming library, such as its animated series Daria and Aeon Flux alongside its unscripted television series The Real World and Made. Over the next two years, MTV Studios would launch its "MTV Documentary Films" label for producing and acquiring documentary features, while MTV Films would be folded into MTV Studios in 2020.

=== MTV Entertainment Studios ===
Final logo used since 2021 to 2025

In 2021, MTV Studios became MTV Entertainment Studios, now encompassing content for, and based on, all brands within the MTV Entertainment Group.

In March 2022, MTV Entertainment Studios established an overall TV partnership with Emmy-winning producer, director & executive producer of the studios' production Mayor of Kingstown Antoine Fuqua and his production banner Hill District Media to produce scripted & unscripted television content with MTV Entertainment Studios alongside its production partner 101 Studios would serve as co-producers for the partnership with Fuqua for its scripted & unscripted content.

In February 2023 when MTV Entertainment Studios' parent Paramount Global interrogated Showtime's streaming platforms into its streaming service Paramount+ (which MTV Entertainment Studios had released its content into the service), MTV Entertainment Studios announced it had merged with Showtime's production operations and its unit Showtime Studios alongside its leadership team into forming a combined entity renaming the production subsidiary to Showtime/MTV Entertainment Studios with Nina L. Diaz continued leading the merged production entitly Showtime/MTV Entertainment Studios as its President of Content and CCO & would serve as Head of Scripted at the merged production unit as it retained the MTV Entertainment Studios and Showtime Studio names whilst Keith Cox continued serving as president of Scripted at the merged production unit Showtime/MTV Entertainment Studios.

A month later in March of that year after MTV Entertainment Studios merged with Showtime's production unit Showtime Studios, Showtime/MTV Entertainment Studios had partnered with film and TV producer Lashan Browning to form a new joint-venture full-service production subsidiary named Antoinette Media that would produce unscripted & scripted television series such as Love & Hip-Hop Atlanta with Showtime/MTV Entertainment Studios under the MTV Entertainment Studios name would co-produce with the new production subsidiary Antoinette Media.

On August 7, 2025, as part of Paramount Global's merger with Skydance Media, Showtime/MTV Entertainment Studios merged with Skydance Television to form Paramount Television Studios; the new company continues to use the MTV Entertainment Studios and Showtime Networks labels for the time being.

== Awards and nominations ==
=== Academy Awards ===
Year	Category	Film	Winner/nominee(s)	Result
2000	Best Adapted Screenplay	Election	Alexander Payne; Jim Taylor	Nominated
2004	Best Documentary Feature	Tupac: Resurrection	Lauren Lazin; Karolyn Ali	Nominated
2006	Best Documentary Feature	Murderball	Henry Alex Rubin; Dana Adam Shapiro	Nominated
2006	Best Original Song	Hustle & Flow	Jordan Houston; Cedric Coleman; Paul Beauregard ("It's Hard out Here for a Pimp")	Won
2006	Best Actor	Hustle & Flow	Terrence Howard	Nominated
2014	Best Makeup and Hairstyling	Jackass Presents: Bad Grandpa	Stephen Prouty	Nominated
2020	Best Documentary Short Subject	St. Louis Superman	Smriti Mundhra; Sami Khan	Nominated
2021	Best Documentary Short Subject	Hunger Ward	Skye Fitzgerald; Michael Scheuerman	Nominated
2022	Best Documentary Feature	Ascension	Jessica Kingdon; Kira Simon-Kennedy; Nathan Truesdell	Nominated
2024	Best Documentary Feature	The Eternal Memory	Maite Alberdi; Juan de Dios Larraín; Pablo Larraín; Rocío Jadue	Nominated
2024	Best Documentary Short Film	The ABCs of Book Banning	Sheila Nevins; Trish Adlesic; Nazenet Habtezghi	Nominated
2025	Best Documentary Feature	Black Box Diaries	Shiori Itō; Eric Nyari; Hanna Aqvilin	Nominated
2025	Best Documentary Short Film	I Am Ready, Warden	Smriti Mundhra; Maya Gnyp	Nominated
