= Just Jenn Productions =

American television production company

- Founder: Jennifer Graziano
- Headquarters: United States
- Website: http://www.weinsteinco.com/

Just Jenn Productions is an American television production company founded by Jennifer Graziano. It handles the reality television shows produced by The Weinstein Company. Graziano is the daughter of New York City mobster and Bonanno crime family consigliere Anthony Graziano, and the sister of Mob Wives reality star Renee Graziano.

== Productions ==
- Big Ang (2012)
- Miami Monkey (2013)
- Mob Wives (2011-2016)
- Mob Wives Chicago (2012)
- Mob Wives: The Sit Down (2012)
