= Miami Monkey =

- Genre: Reality television
- Created by: Jennifer Graziano
- Starring: Angela "Big Ang" Raiola
- Country of origin: United States
- Original language: English
- No. of seasons: 1
- No. of episodes: 11

Production
- Executive producers: Banks Tarver; Ben Silverman; Bob Weinstein; David Glasser; Harvey Weinstein; Jennifer Graziano; Jimmy Fox; Kari McFarland; Ken Druckerman; Meryl Poster; Nina L. Diaz; Rick Hankey; Shelly Tatro
- Running time: 42 minutes
- Production companies: Electus; Just Jenn Productions; Left/Right Productions; The Weinstein Company Television

Original release
- Network: VH1
- Release: September 8 – November 11, 2013

Related
- Big Ang; Mob Wives

Miami Monkey is an American reality television series that premiered on VH1 on September 8, 2013. Developed as the third spin-off of Mob Wives, the series chronicled Angela "Big Ang" Raiola as she opened up a second location of her Staten Island bar.

The show featured Big Ang, her daughter Raquel, and their team of staff that assist in the daily operations.

In May 2013, Raiola confirmed during an interview that a second season of her show Big Ang was being produced, but it was later revealed that the season would be retooled as another spin-off. The series name stems from the name of Ang's bar that opened on May 19, 2013. Raiola moved to Miami for filming in April 2013 with production ending on August 11, 2013.

In July 2014, Raiola confirmed that the show had been canceled.

== Cast ==
- Angela "Big Ang" Raiola, main cast member on Mob Wives and Big Ang
- Raquel D'Onofrio, Big Ang's daughter
- Ryan Marisca, a bartender, Raquel's best friend
- Marissa Sabatelli, a waitress, Raquel's best friend
- Roxanne Raiola, manager, married to Big Ang's nephew Ronnie
- Morgan Osman, a bartender, appeared on season five of Bad Girls Club
- Cristina Healion, a bartender
- Nate Ryan, a bartender and DJ
- Gabriella Celestino, a hostess, girlfriend of Big Ang's son AJ

== Episodes ==
No.	Title	Original release date	US viewers (millions)
1	"Miami Monkey"	September 8, 2013	0.63
In the series premiere, Big Ang puts together the final preparations prior to opening her new bar in South Beach by calling in some of her friends and family from Staten Island.
2	"Monkey Wrench"	September 15, 2013	N/A
Ang and Raquel have to defuse a problem between staff members after one of them has a temper tantrum. Later, one of the employees is caught stealing.
3	"Mo' Monkey Mo' Problems"	September 22, 2013	N/A
The Miami Monkey staff prepare for their promotional photo shoot, and begin to question who they can trust after the tequila thief confesses. One of the girls walks off the set of the shoot, which leaves Ang to figure out how to find a replacement and move on while losing another employee.
4	"Monkey In The Middle"	September 29, 2013	N/A
Ang plans a special photo shoot for Morgan to promote for the Miami Monkey.
5	"Monkey Business"	October 6, 2013	0.63
The New York girls continue to fight while Nate and Cristina hook up.
6	"A Big Ang Birthday"	October 10, 2013	N/A
Ang celebrates her birthday with a party and a Monkey.
7	"Drama and Drag"	October 17, 2013	N/A
Morgan starts to spread gossip to keep her position at the bar, which ends up in a confrontation.
8	"Worst Team Meeting Ever"	October 24, 2013	N/A
Raquel starts a staff meeting about the gossip and to fix work relationships with the staff.
9	"Whine Bar"	October 31, 2013	N/A
Ang opens a wine tasting event, while Morgan and Cristina start more drama.
10	"Monkeys In Bikinis"	November 7, 2013	N/A
Ang ends the summer with a bikini fashion show with one staff member, Morgan not attending.
11	"Season Finale"	November 11, 2013	N/A
Ang and the staff say goodbye to Miami and the Miami Monkey. Morgan gets fired by Ang and Cristina decides on going to rehab.
