= Can't Get a Date =

- Starring: Stefan Springman
- Country of origin: United States

Production
- Executive producers: Manny Kivowitz; Toby Barraud; Stefan Springman
- Running time: 30 minutes No. of seasons = 3 No. of episodes = 14

Original release
- Network: VH1 and Logo
- Release: April 7, 2006 – November 21, 2008

Can't Get a Date is a documentary-style reality show on VH1 and Logo.

The show takes a variety of individuals from New York City who feel that they have personal issues that are holding them back from finding romance. An anonymous host, producer Stefan Springman, guides them through lifestyle changes – physical, emotional, and behavioral – to help them improve themselves and ultimately become more "dateable".

As VH1 states on its website, Can't Get a Date "explores the problems of such people and teaches them the skills to find love in an honest, amusing, and unique way".

The working title of the program was "Crushed Out", and the program was co-created by Stefan Springman, Toby Barraud, and Manny Kivowitz.

The final original episode of Can't Get A Date aired on June 28, 2006. The series run is available free to watch on the Logo website. It was also licensed exclusively to Netflix as part of an ongoing licensing agreement between the network and the company; it can be watched by Netflix account holders via their website, and an exclusive DVD (by "Red Envelope Entertainment") can be rented through Netflix. It contains only the gay and lesbian episodes.

== List of episodes ==
Episodes are listed by their original air-date.

- April 7, 2006 - Morgan (VH1)
- April 14, 2006 - Mya (VH1)
- April 21, 2006 - Jim (VH1)
- April 28, 2006 - Leticia (VH1)
- May 5, 2006 - Marc (VH1)
- May 12, 2006 - Will (VH1)
- May 19, 2006 - Bennet (VH1)
- May 26, 2006 - Mandy (VH1)
- June 7, 2006 - Jenni (Logo)
- June 14, 2006 - James Bradford (Logo)
- June 21, 2006 - Verushka (Logo)
- June 28, 2006 - Robert (Logo)
