= Drita D'Avanzo =

American reality television personality (born 1976)

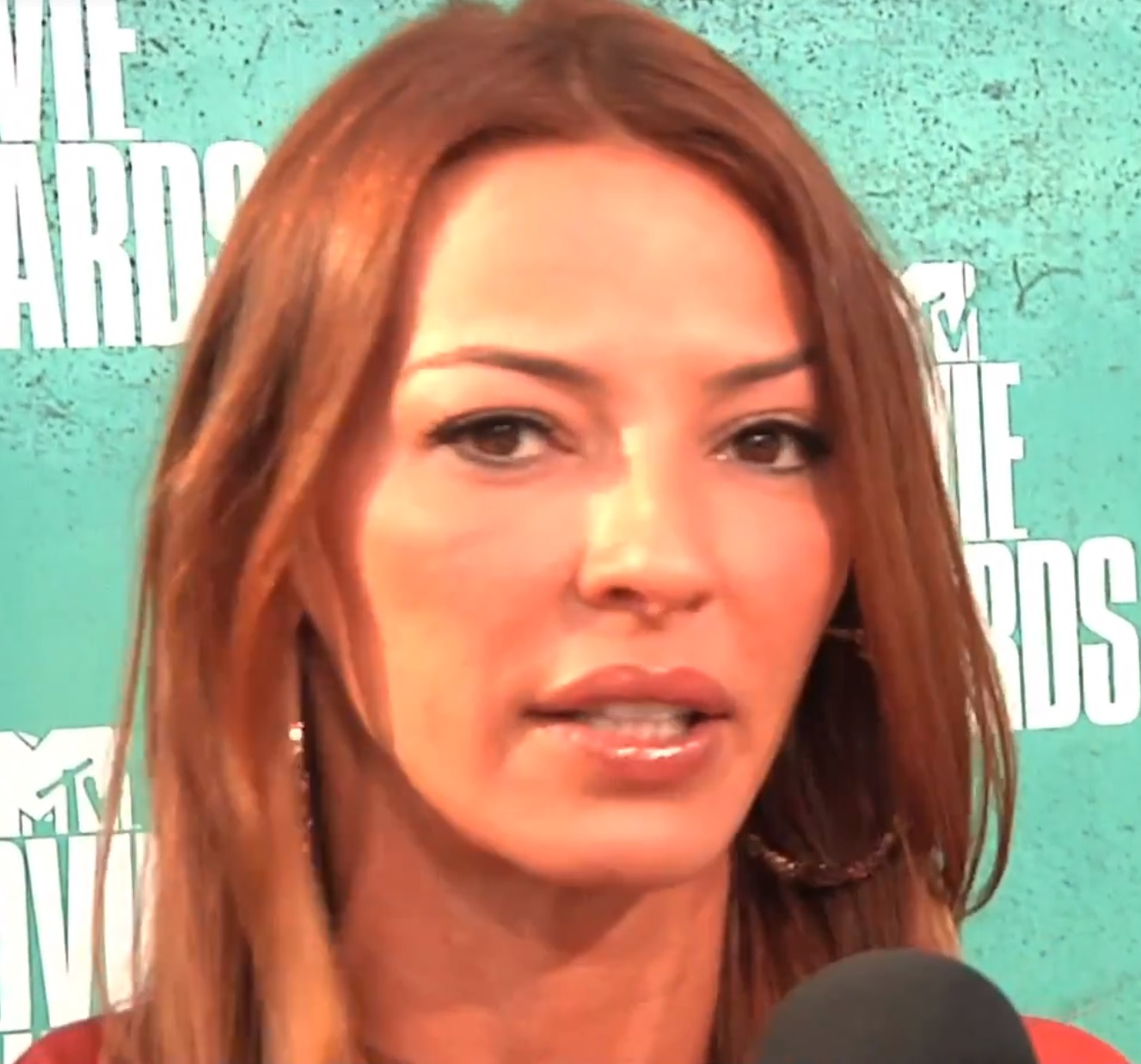
- D'Avanzo at the 2012 MTV Movie Awards
- Born: Drita Selmani; February 6, 1976 (age 50); New York City, U.S.
- Occupation: Television personality
- Known for: Mob Wives
- Spouse: Lee D'Avanzo (m. 2000; sep. 2024)
- Children: 2
- Relatives: Florina Kaja (cousin)

Drita D'Avanzo (née Selmani; born February 6, 1976) is an American reality television personality who appeared on the VH1 series Mob Wives from 2011 to 2016. She also appeared on Mob Wives spinoff Big Ang.

== Early life ==
D'Avanzo was born in Staten Island, New York and grew up in the Todt Hill projects after her family emigrated from Albania. She attended Susan E. Wagner High School, where she played soccer.

== Career ==
On The Tomorrow Show with Keven Undergaro, D'Avanzo stated that she is working on a spinoff of her own. D'Avanzo makes regular appearances as herself on television, with notables including Celebrity Ghost Stories and Watch What Happens Live!. In August 2017, she was announced as a cast member on the Big Brother-style VH1 reality show Scared Famous. She is known for her hot-tempered personality.

D'Avanzo has worked for several upscale cosmetic companies as a freelance makeup artist and has launched her own cosmetics line called "Lady Boss by Drita".

== Legal issues ==
D'Avanzo and her husband Lee D'Avanzo, who federal prosecutors allege is a member of the Colombo crime family, were arrested on December 19, 2019; they were charged with criminal drug and multiple firearms possession after a search warrant was executed on their home. The firearms were a .38-caliber revolver and a 9 mm, both loaded with hollow-point bullets. On February 21, 2020, the charges against her were dropped, while Lee pleaded not guilty to gun possession charges. On March 20, 2020, Lee pleaded guilty to the charge and on August 7, 2020, he was sentenced to 64 months in prison. In sentencing him, the judge cited his extensive criminal history, which entails six convictions. He was incarcerated at FCI McKean, a medium security Federal prison located in Lewis Run, Pennsylvania. He was released on July 14, 2023.

== Personal life ==
Drita has two daughters with Lee D’Avanzo: Aleeya (born 2001) and Gizelle (born 2007). On March 25, 2024, Drita announced that she had been secretly separated from her husband for a couple years as he had been arrested in 2020.

She is cousins with Bad Girls Club star, Florina Kaja.
