= Renee Graziano =

American novelist

- Born: July 12, 1969 (age 57); Brooklyn, New York, U.S.
- Other name: Renee Graziano-Pagan
- Occupations: Television personality, author
- Years active: 2010–present
- Known for: Mob Wives
- Spouse(s): Hector Pagan, Jr. (divorced)
- Children: 1
- Father: Anthony Graziano

Renee Graziano (born July 12, 1969) is an American reality television personality and author. She is known for being the daughter of Anthony Graziano, a former consigliere of the Bonanno crime family and her roles in two reality television shows, Mob Wives and Celebrity Big Brother. In 2016, Renee came in third on Celebrity Big Brother 18.

== Family ==
Graziano lives in Staten Island, New York City. Her former husband, Hector Pagan, Jr., was a mobster who became a DEA informant, and gave evidence against her father, Anthony Graziano. They have one son, AJ.

== Career ==
Graziano has appeared as a prominent figure in all six seasons of Mob Wives, between 2011 and 2016. The show was conceived, and is executive-produced, by Graziano's sister, Jenn. In 2016, she appeared in Celebrity Big Brother 18 where she reached the finale, placing third, with 14.66% of the total vote. She was the last-standing female and last remaining American in the house. In January 2017, Graziano and her partner, Joey Gambino, were featured on the ninth season of Marriage Boot Camp. In December 2022, she starred in the VH1 movie Fuhgeddabout Christmas alongside Justina Valentine, Vinny Guadagnino, and Teresa Giudice.

In late 2024, Graziano began hosting her own podcast and YouTube channel called The CRYsis Queen Podcast, featuring various celebrity guest interviews and discussions on a range of topics. The channel's official description states: "Renee Graziano's CRYsis Queen is a thunderous declaration of the truth beneath the flashbulbs and fame. Media and industry headline stories that are whispered about in the shadows will be given a stage. Renee and her guests are doing more than sharing their stories—they will be digging deep and revealing the often painful humanity that unites us all. CRYsis Queen is more than a podcast; it's a raw, pulsating heart, beating out rhythms of resilience, defiance, and undeniable truth."

Graziano has released two books: a semi-autobiographical novel, Playing With Fire, and a cookbook, How to Use a Meat Cleaver: Secrets and Recipes from a Mob Family's Kitchen (2014).

== DUI Arrest ==
Graziano was arrested on charges of operating a motor vehicle while impaired after she crashed her car into a parked car in Staten Island, New York on January 4, 2022. Graziano was driving a 2020 Nissan Murano when she allegedly lost control and collided with an unoccupied 2020 Jeep Wrangler at the intersection of Arden Avenue and Arthur Kill Road.
