= Nina L. Diaz =

Viacom executive

- Education: Fordham University
- Occupations: Media executive, producer
- Years active: 1995–present
- Employer: Paramount Global
- Television: Mob Wives; MTV Cribs; My Super Sweet 16; The Osbournes
- Title: President of Content and Chief Creative Officer, Showtime/MTV Entertainment Studios

Nina L. Diaz is an American media executive and television producer. She is the President of Content and Chief Creative Officer for Showtime/MTV Entertainment Studios. She is best known for creating television shows for the MTV, VH1, and Bravo networks, including MTV Cribs, The Osbournes, Mob Wives, and The Real Housewives of New Jersey.

== Early life and education ==
Diaz grew up in the Washington Heights and Harlem neighborhoods of Manhattan. Her father is journalist David Diaz. She attended college at Fordham University.

== Career ==
Diaz began working in television at New Jersey PBS affiliate WNET as an assistant to producer Steven Weinstock. In 1995, she began working for Viacom on a documentary about people with HIV, and in 1997 joined MTV as a freelancer. She later became a full staff member, working as a producer for MTV News and on the network's documentaries. While in this role, she pitched MTV Cribs to network executives as a way to refresh the traditional sit-down interview format. The show premiered in September 2000. Diaz has been credited with the development of The Osbournes and My Super Sweet 16.

In 2007, Diaz left MTV to work as an independent producer where she developed several shows for different networks, including VH1's Mob Wives and Bravo's The Real Housewives of New Jersey. She returned to Viacom (now Paramount Global) in 2014 as Senior Vice President of East Coast Production and Development at VH1. In 2016, she was promoted to Executive Vice President for Unscripted Programming on VH1 and MTV and two years later was elevated President of Programming and Development for MTV, VH1, and the Logo Group. During this time, she developed a variety of shows popular in the 18-34 age demographic, including Martha and Snoop's Potluck Dinner Party, Love & Hip Hop, Floribama Shore, Siesta Key, Black Ink Crew, Hip Hop Squares, Jersey Shore: Family Vacation, Ex on the Beach, The Amber Rose Show, and a reboot of America's Next Top Model. She was also responsible for renewing Total Request Live, Teen Mom: Young and Pregnant, and The Challenge: Champs vs. Pros.

In 2020, Diaz became President of Content and Chief Creative Officer of MTV Entertainment Studios. In that role, she oversaw both scripted and unscripted programming at MTV, Comedy Central, TV Land, Paramount Network, Smithsonian Channel, VH1, Pop, Logo TV, and CMT. She led development of unscripted shows and adult animation for Paramount+ in 2021 as its chief creative officer for those divisions while retaining her role with MTV Entertainment. In February 2023, Diaz became President of Content and Chief Creative Officer at Showtime/MTV Entertainment Studios following the merger of the two entities. She co-executive produced The Agency in 2024.

== Selected filmography ==
Film
Year	Title	Role	Ref.
2021	The Bitch Who Stole Christmas	Executive producer	
2021	Miracles Across 125th Street	Executive producer	
2023	The Eternal Memory	Executive producer	
2023	Last Song From Kabul (short film)	Executive producer	
2023	Mourning in Lod	Executive producer	
2024	Black Box Diaries	Executive producer	
2024	Death Without Mercy	Executive producer	
2024	The Honey Trap: A True Story of Love, Lies and The FBI	Producer	
2024	I Am Ready, Warden (short film)	Executive producer	

Television
Year	Title	Role	Ref.
2000	MTV Cribs	Creator	
2002	The Osbournes	Creator	
2005	My Super Sweet 16	Creator	
2009	The Real Housewives of New Jersey	Producer	
2011	Love & Hip Hop: New York	Executive producer	
2011	Mob Wives	Executive producer	
2017	Fear Factor	Executive producer	
2017	Floribama Shore	Executive producer	
2017	Scared Famous	Executive producer	
2018	Jersey Shore: Family Vacation	Executive producer	
2018	Love & Hip Hop: Miami	Executive producer	
2019	Cartel Crew	Executive producer	
2021	Dragging the Classics: The Brady Bunch	Executive producer	
2024	The Agency	Executive producer	
2025	MobLand	Executive producer	
