= Electus =

Television production company

- Type: Subsidiary
- Industry: Television production; Distribution; Licensing; Multimedia
- Founded: 2009; 17 years ago
- Founders: Ben Silverman; Drew Buckley
- Defunct: 2018; 8 years ago
- Fate: Sold to Propagate Content
- Headquarters: Los Angeles, California, United States
- Key people: Chris Grant (CEO); Drew Buckley (COO & Head of Digital); John Pollak (President of Electus International); Max Levenson (VP, Current & Creative Development); Stephanie Ward (Director, Business and Legal Affairs); Max Richards (Executive Producer)
- Products: Television
- Parent: Propagate Content
- Divisions: Electus International
- Website: www.electus.com

Electus was a production company founded by Ben Silverman in 2009. It was financed by IAC. The company had development deals with NBC, ABC, MTV, VH1, Facebook, Yahoo!, and AOL. In 2018, IAC sold Electus to Propagate Content.

== History and partners ==
Electus was founded by Ben Silverman, former co-chairman of NBC Entertainment and chief executive officer of Reveille, and financed by Barry Diller’s IAC in 2009. As part of its inception, IAC partnered Electus with CollegeHumor, the comedy portal that had developed series both on the web and TV.

In January 2010, Electus partnered with Jason Bateman and Will Arnett to launch a sponsor-driven advertising and digital production company, DumbDumb, which launched branded campaigns including one for Orbit Gum, and an online talk show on behalf of Denny's called "Always Open".

In August 2010, Electus announced a production and distribution deal with 5x5 Media, headed by Craig Armstrong, Rick Ringbakk, and Tod Mesirow, whose combined producer credits include Survivor, Amazing Race, Extreme Makeover: Home Edition, Jamie Oliver's Food Revolution and many more.

In January 2011, Electus acquired Engine Entertainment and formed a new in-house global distribution arm, Electus/Engine Distribution. The new division handled in-house and third-party projects for distribution globally, including a partnership with Abbot Reif Hameiri Production Company, a leading production company in Israel.

In January 2011, Electus partnered with former MTV President of programming Tony DiSanto and head of series development Liz Gateley, to form an independent, multi-media production company, DiGa. DiGa was to focus on producing reality and scripted series for primetime cable and network outlets.

In June 2012, Electus partnered with YouTube to launch the YouTube food channel HUNGRY with Celebrity chefs Duff Goldman and Laura Vitale.

In 2013, Electus took over College Humor/Dorkly and created Big Breakfast, the studio behind Adam Ruins Everything (TruTV), Middle of the Night Show (MTV), Fatal Decisions (Go90), Bad Internet (YouTube Red), Comedy Music Awards (IFC) and Hot Date (Pop).

In 2018, IAC sold Electus to Propagate Content.

== Projects ==
Electus projects included:

- The Toy Box (2017; Co-produced with Mattel)
- No Tomorrow (2016–17; Co-produced with Warner Bros. Television)
- Running Wild with Bear Grylls (Current; Co-produced with Bear Grylls Ventures)
- Jane the Virgin (2014–19; Co-produced with Warner Bros. Television and CBS Television Studios)
- Food Fighters (2014–15; Co-produced with Rio Bravo and Universal Television)
- King of the Nerds (UK) (2015; Co-produced with Objective Productions)
- King of the Nerds (2013–15; Co-produced with 5x5 Media)
- Fashion Star (2012–13; Co-produced with 5x5 Media, Magical Elves, EJD Productions, and The Global Fashion Association)
- Car Boss (2012; Co-produced with 5x5 Media)
- Mob Wives (2011–16; Co-produced with The Weinstein Company Television)
- William the Conqueror (2011)
- Master of the Mix (2010)
- Crowd Sourced Hero (current Facebook program)
- Jerk All Stars (2010; MySpace)
- The Sheriff (2011; Co-produced with 5x5 Media)
- Marco Polo (2014–16; Co-produced with The Weinstein Company Television)
- YouTube official food channel HUNGRY (2012)
- Bet on Your Baby (2013–14; Co-produced with 5x5 Media)
- The Hero (2013; Co-produced with 5x5 Media)
- Miami Monkey (2013; Co-produced with Just Jenn, Left-Right, and The Weinstein Company Television)
- Killer Women (2014; Co-produced with Latin World Entertainment and ABC Studios)
- Candid Camera (2014: Co-produced with Candid Camera, Inc.)
- Terry Crews Saves Christmas (2016)
- Winsanity (2016)
- Flaked (2016)
- Dog and Beth: On the Hunt (2013–15)
- Hot Date (2017–19)
