= Left/Right Productions =

New York-based production company

Left/Right
- Industry: Entertainment
- Founded: 2005
- Founders: Banks Tarver; Ken Druckerman
- Headquarters: New York City, United States
- Key people: Banks Tarver, Ken Druckerman
- Products: Television/Scripted & Unscripted
- Website: www.leftright.tv

Left/Right is a New York-based American television production company that was founded in 2005 by Banks Tarver and Ken Druckerman, the company produces fiction and non-fiction entertainment ranging from reality television to documentary programming to scripted sitcoms.

== History ==
Left/Right was established in 2005 by Banks Tarver and Ken Druckerman to produce factual, reality and scripted programming for American networks. In August 2012, German entertainment production studio Red Arrow Entertainment Group (part of ProSiebenSat.1 Media) took a majority stake in Left/Right to increase their American production operations with Tarver and Druckerman continuing to run the company.

In late-January 2019, Left/Right restructured its senior management team with Mary Robertson assuming the role of senior VP of current production and Pete Ross taking the role of senior VP of development.

In April 2022 they announced they had restructured their executive team as Anneka Jones, who was executive VP of development & current production, became CCO, Esther Dere became executive producer and Michael Mezaros assumed the role of executive VP of post production and executive producer of Left/Right's documentary film division.

In July 2022 Red Arrow Studios exited the American television production industry and sold its US production operations, including Left/Right, to The North Road Company, a global independent and production content studio established by Peter Chernin that would bring his film and television production company Chernin Entertainment and the unscripted production studio Words + Pictures under one roof. At the same time, its newly established international division, North Road International took over Left/Right's programming catalogue and would distribute their future productions.

In 2025, founders Banks Tarver and Ken Druckerman took back full ownership of the company.

== Television series ==
Title	Years	Network	Notes
True Life	1998	MTV	
Frontline	2005-	PBS	
I Pity the Fool	2006	TV Land	With Mr T
The Agency	2007	VH1	
The Salt-N-Pepa Show	2007	VH1	
This American Life (TV series)	2007-2009	Showtime	With Ira Glass
Kimora: Life in the Fab Lane	2007-2011	Style Network	With Kimora Lee Simmons
The Rachel Zoe Project	2008-2013	Bravo	Hosted by Rachel Zoe
Running in Heels	2009	Style Network	
The Fashion Show: Ultimate Collection	2009-2011	Bravo	
House of Glam	2010	Oxygen (TV network)	
TRANSform Me	2010	VH1	With Laverne Cox
Let's Talk About Pep	2010	VH1	
Russian Dolls (2011 TV series)	2011	Lifetime (TV channel)	
Mob Wives	2011-2016	VH1	
United Stats of America	2012	History Channel	
Mob Wives Chicago	2012	VH1	
Big Ang (TV series)	2012	VH1	
Mob Wives: The Sit Down	2012	VH1	
Small Town Security	2012-2014	AMC	
Wicked Single	2013	VH1	
Miami Monkey	2013	VH1	
Scoring the Deal	2013	HGTV	
Kimora: House of Fab	2013	Style Network	With Kimora Lee Simmons
Hawaii Life	2013-2019	HGTV	
Chasing Maria Menounos	2014	Oxygen (TV network)	
3AM	2015	Showtime	co-production with Showtime Networks and Wolf Films
Donny!	2015	USA Network	Starring Donny Deutsch
Knock Knock, It's Tig Notaro	2015	Showtime	Starring Tig Notaro
Odd Mom Out	2015-2017	Bravo	co-production with Rottenberg-Zuritsky Productions (seasons 1-2) & Piro Vision & Jax Media
The Internet Ruined My Life	2016	Syfy	
Generation X	2016	National Geographic	Narrated by Christian Slater
The Circus: Inside the Greatest Political Show on Earth	2016-2023	Showtime	co-production with Showtime Networks and Bloomberg Politics
Ride with Norman Reedus	2016-2025	AMC	Starring Norman Reedus
First Family of Hip Hop	2017	Bravo	co-production with Bravo Media Productions and Mad Fusion
Trumped: Inside the Greatest Political Upset of All Time	2017	Showtime	
The Zoo	2017-2021	Animal Planet	Filmed on location at the Bronx Zoo
Bobcat Goldthwait's Misfits & Monsters	2018	TruTV	Starring Bobcat Goldthwait
The Aquarium	2019-2020	Animal Planet	Filmed on location at the Georgia Aquarium
The New York Times Presents	2019-2024	FX	Known as The Weekly for season 1; co-production with The New York Times Company; Based on the podcast The Daily
Slow Burn	2020	Epix	The TV adaptation of the Slow Burn podcast
(Un)well	2020	Netflix	
Fiasco	2021	Epix	The TV adaptation of the podcast by Leon Neyfakh
Alex Murdaugh: Death. Deception. Power	2021	Oxygen (TV network)	Featuring Alex Murdaugh
Batali: The Fall of a Superstar Chef	2022	Food Network	Featuring Mario Batali
Gutsy	2022	Apple TV	With Hillary Clinton and Chelsea Clinton
The Murdochs: Empire of Influence	2022	CNN	Featuring the Murdoch family
Bake It ‘Til You Make It	2022-2023	Food Network	
Giuliani: What Happened to America's Mayor?	2023	CNN	Featuring Rudy Giuliani
Glitch: The Rise & Fall of HQ Trivia	2023	CNN	
Beyond The Battlefield	2023	History Channel	
Game 7	2024	Prime Video	
Tryouts	2024	ESPN+	
Lady of The Dunes: Hunting the Cape Cod Killer	2024	Oxygen (TV network)	
Killer Lies: Chasing a True Crime Con Man	2024	National Geographic	
Accident, Suicide, or Murder	2024-	Oxygen (TV network)	
Running With The Wolves	2025	ESPN+	With Mark Consuelos and Kelly Ripa
Celtics City	2025	HBO	
Let The Devil In	2025	MGM+	With Eli Roth
Andrew Young: The Dirty Work	2025	MS NOW (formerly MSNBC)	With Andrew Young
Scott Peterson: The New Evidence	2026	A&E	Featuring Scott Peterson (convicted murderer)
Bob and David Climb Machu Picchu	2026	Tribeca Film Festival	Starring Bob Odenkirk and David Cross
Long Play	2026-	YouTube	Hosted by Jennifer Palmieri and Errin Haines
