= Baby fat =

Baby fat may refer to:

- Brown adipose tissue, a heat-generating type of tissue present in infants
- The fat roll on babies during the initial child development stages
- Childhood obesity

== See also ==
- Baby Phat
