= 24th GLAAD Media Awards =

Annual US media awards ceremony

The 24th GLAAD Media Awards was the 2013 annual presentation of the GLAAD Media Awards, presented by GLAAD (Note: The Gay & Lesbian Alliance Against Defamation was formally renamed GLAAD on March 24, 2013, in between the first and second award ceremonies.) honoring the 2012 season. The awards honored films, television shows, musicians and works of journalism that fairly and accurately represent the LGBT community and issues relevant to the community. The 24th Annual GLAAD Media Awards honored 153 nominees in 25 English-language categories and eight Spanish-language categories.

Awards were presented in three separate ceremonies: in New York City on March 16, 2013, in Los Angeles on April 20, 2013 and in San Francisco on May 11, 2013.

== Winners and nominees ==
Winners are presented in bold.

=== English-language categories ===
Award	Winners and nominees
Outstanding Film - Wide Release	**The Perks of Being a Wallflower**: The Best Exotic Marigold Hotel; Cloud Atlas; ParaNorman; Your Sister's Sister
Outstanding Film - Limited Release	**Any Day Now**: Keep the Lights On; Mosquita y Mari; Musical Chairs; North Sea Texas
Outstanding Drama Series	**Smash**: Degrassi: The Next Generation; Grey's Anatomy; The L.A. Complex; True Blood
Outstanding Comedy Series	**The New Normal**: Glee; Go On; Happy Endings; Modern Family
Outstanding Individual Episode (in a series without a regular LGBT character)	**"Don't Ask, Don't Tell Me What to Do" of Raising Hope**: "Family Matters" of Drop Dead Diva; "L'Affaire Du Coeur" of Franklin & Bash; "Lost and Found" of Touch; "Ruby Slippers" of The Mentalist
Outstanding TV Movie or Mini-Series	**American Horror Story: Asylum**: Hit & Miss; Political Animals
Outstanding Documentary	**How to Survive a Plague**: Wish Me Away; Codebreaker; Hit So Hard; Vito
Outstanding Reality Program	**The Amazing Race**: "It Is What It Is" of Here Comes Honey Boo Boo; "Welcome to Hollywood!" of Pregnant in Heels; Small Town Security; The Real L Word
Outstanding Talk Show Episode	**"At Home with Neil Patrick Harris, His Fiancé David Burtka, & Their Twins" of Oprah's Next Chapter**: "Autoshop Restores Bullied Gay Student's Car for Free" of The Ellen DeGeneres Show; "Bishop Gene Robinson" of The Daily Show; "Marriage Equality" of The Suze Orman Show; "The Husband Who is Now a Woman and the Daughter Who is Now a Son" of The Jeff Probst Show
Outstanding Daily Drama	**Days of Our Lives**: The Bold and the Beautiful
Outstanding TV Journalism - News Magazine	**"Being Transgender in America"** of Melissa Harris-Perry: "Almost Equal" of Chronicle; "End of an Error" of The Rachel Maddow Show; "Golden Star" of Rock Center with Brian Williams; "The Last Closet" of Real Sports with Bryant Gumbel
Outstanding TV Journalism Segment	**"Obama Endorses Marriage Equality"** of Good Morning America: "Civil Rights Icon Supports Gay Marriage" of CNN Newsroom; "Controversial Pastor Preaches Against Gays" of Anderson Cooper 360°; "Matthew Mitcham Olympics Profile" of Olympics on NBC; "Scout Mom Dismissed" of MSNBC Live
Outstanding Newspaper Article	**"Game Changer" by Andy Mannix, City Pages**: "Black Church Reaches Out to Gay, Transgender Teens" by Meghan E. Irons, The Boston Globe; "Generation Halsted" (series), Windy City Times; "Most Local School Districts Ignore State's Anti-Gay Bullying Law" by Phillip Zonkel, Press-Telegram; "Turned Away, He Turned to the Bible" by Douglas Quenqua, The New York Times
Outstanding Newspaper Columnist	**Frank Bruni, The New York Times**: Bill Nemitz, Portland Press Herald; Leonard Pitts, The Miami Herald; Eugene Robinson, The Washington Post; Dan Rodricks, The Baltimore Sun
Outstanding Newspaper Overall Coverage	**The Boston Globe**: The Baltimore Sun; Portland Press Herald; Sioux City Journal; USA Today
Outstanding Magazine Article	**"School of Hate" by Sabrina Rubin Erdely, Rolling Stone**: "The First Gay President" by Andrew Sullivan, Newsweek; "The Marriage Plot: Inside This Year's Epic Campaign for Gay Equality" by Molly Ball, The Atlantic; "Netherland" by Rachel Aviv, The New Yorker; "The Transgender Athlete" by Pablo S. Torre and David Epstein, Sports Illustrated
Outstanding Magazine Overall Coverage	**The Advocate/Out**: New York; The New Yorker; People; Seventeen
Outstanding Digital Journalism Article	**"Why Aren't We Fighting for CeCe McDonald?"** by Marc Lamont Hill, Ebony.com: "The Beautiful Daughter: How My Korean Mother Gave Me the Courage to Transition" by Andy Marra, HuffingtonPost.com; "Boardroom Battle: Directors Clash Over Gay Rights" by Ryan Ruggiero, CNBC.com; "Eight Months in Solitary" by Andrew Harmon, Advocate.com; "Workplace Protections for LGBT Workers Remain Stalled" by Chris Geidner, BuzzFeed.com
Outstanding Digital Journalism - Multimedia	**"Edie Takes on DOMA"** In the Life, ITLMedia.org: "The Advocate 45" (series), Advocate.com; "Athletes at Core of 'Fearless' Photo Project" by Patrick Dorsey and Jeff Sheng, ESPN.com; "'Don't Ask, Don't Tell': Transgender Officers on Secretly Serving in the U.S. Military" by Marc Lamont Hill, Live.HuffingtonPost.com; "Gay Rights in the US, State by State", GuardianNews.com
Outstanding Blog	**Rod 2.0**: Autostraddle; blac(k)ademic; The New Civil Rights Movement; Towleroad
Outstanding Music Artist	**Adam Lambert**, Trespassing (tie); **Frank Ocean**, Channel Orange (tie): Gossip, A Joyful Noise; Scissor Sisters, Magic Hour; Rufus Wainwright, Out of the Game
Outstanding Comic Book	**Kevin Keller** by Dan Parent, Archie Comics: Astonishing X-Men by Marjorie Liu, Marvel Comics; Batwoman by J.H. Williams III and W. Haden Blackman, DC Comics; Buffy the Vampire Slayer by Andrew Chambliss, Scott Allie, Jane Espenson, Drew Z. Greenberg, Dark Horse Comics; Earth 2 by James Robinson, DC Comics
Outstanding Los Angeles Theatre	**The Children by Michael Elyanow**: Edith Can Shoot Things and Hit Them by A. Rey Pamatmat; The Irish Curse by Martin Casella; Pieces by Chris Phillips; Silent by Pat Kinevane
Outstanding New York Theatre: Broadway and Off-Broadway	**The Whale by Samuel D. Hunter**: Bring It On: The Musical Book by Jeff Whitty, music and lyrics by Lin-Manuel Miranda, Tom Kitt and Amanda Green; Cock by Mike Bartlett; The Columnist by David Auburn; Vanya and Sonia and Masha and Spike by Christopher Durang
Outstanding New York Theatre: Off-Off Broadway	**From White Plains written by Michael Perlman in collaboration with Fault Line Theatre**: Baby Daddy by Alec Mapa; A Map of Virtue by Erin Courtney; Sontag: Reborn adapted by Moe Angelos, based on the book by Susan Sontag; Tail! Spin! created by Mario Correa

=== Spanish-language categories ===
Award	Winners and nominees
Outstanding Daytime Talk Show Episode	**"Confirma su identidad como mujer" Showbiz, CNN en Español**: "Fama y arte, ¿relacionados con la homosexualidad?" Paparazzi Magazine, Mega TV; "Lesbiana deportada" Caso Cerrado, Telemundo
Outstanding Talk Show Interview	**"Entrevista con Orlando Cruz" Titulares Telemundo, Telemundo**: "Entrevista con Christian Chávez" Cala, CNN en Español; "La familia de hoy" Notimujer, CNN en Español; "Muerte Zamudio: ¿Nacerá una ley?" Conclusiones, CNN en Español; "Violencia en contra de las personas LGBT" Al Punto, Univision
Outstanding TV Journalism - News Magazine	**"La vida en rosa" Aquí y Ahora, Univision (tie)** **"Los transexuales buscan su identidad en medio de ignorancia y prejuicios" Encuentro, CNN en Español (tie)**: "Respeto a la diversidad" Primer Impacto, Univision; "Terapia de reorientación sexual" Encuentro, CNN en Español; "Víctima del acoso: la historia de Amanda" Despierta América, Univision
Outstanding TV Journalism Segment	**"En el cuerpo equivocado"** Noticias 19, KUVS-DT: "Apoyo histórico" Noticiero Telemundo, Telemundo; "Comunidad LGBT en NY denuncia persecución policíaca" Noticias MundoFox, MundoFox; "Demócratas hacen esfuerzo para buscar apoyo" Informativo NTN, NTN24; "Reciben amenazas" Al Rojo Vivo, Telemundo
Outstanding Newspaper Article	**"Gays y padres excelentes" by Pilar Marrero, La Opinión**: "Matrimonio gay, un sueño cumplido para muchos" by Juan Matossian, El Diario la Prensa; "Promueven tolerancia y respeto a estudiantes gay" by Anna Macías, Al Día; "Sigue el acoso contra estudiantes LGBT" by Araceli Martínez Ortega, La Opinión; "Transgénero es elegida como concejal en Cuba" by Andrea Rodríguez, Associated Press
Outstanding Magazine Article	**"Amor genuino" by Cristina Saralegui, People en Español**: "La lucha de Bamby" by Isis Sauceda, People en Español; "Samy ¡Sufrió por el machismo de su papá!" TV y Novelas
Outstanding Digital Journalism Article	**"Operación tolerancia: la lucha contra la homofobia en los medios hispanos" by Lilia Luciano, voces.huffingtonpost.com**: "Arianna, una transexual que lucha por su comunidad" by Alejandra Chaparro, Terra.com; "Así queda el poder gay tras las elecciones" by Elizabeth Cotte, Univision.com; "Hostigan a estudiantes por ser gay" by Wilma Maldonado Arrigoitía, PrimeraHora.com; "¿Es posible ser homosexual y ser persona de fe? " by Cary Tabares, HolaCiudad.com
Outstanding Digital Journalism - Multimedia	**"2013: Año clave para la comunidad gay" by Ramón Frisneda, ElDiarioNY.com**: "Manifestaciones del orgullo gay alrededor del mundo", EFE

== Honorees ==
- Vito Russo Award: Anderson Cooper
- Advocate for Change Award: President Bill Clinton
- Stephen F. Kolzak Award: Steve Warren (attorney)
- Davidson/Valentini Award: Adam Lambert
