= Keith Edwards (media personality) =

American media personality and political strategist

- Edwards in 2025
- Occupations: Media personality, political strategist, political commentator

Substack information
- Newsletter: No Lies Detected
- Notes: @keithedwards
- Topic: Politics

X information
- Handle: @keithedwards
- Followers: 184.5k

YouTube information
- Channel: Keith Edwards
- Years active: 2024–present
- Genre: Political commentary
- Subscribers: 1.38 million
- Last updated: Novembef 17, 2026

Keith Edwards is an American media personality and political strategist and commentator known for his work in political communications and YouTube political commentary.

== Career ==
A former Detroit beauty salon worker, Edwards relocated to New York in 2005 and ended up in television production, working on such reality shows as The Real Housewives of Miami and Wicked Single.

In 2019, he moved from production to political strategy co-ordination, joining the communications team of New York city council speaker Corey Johnson.

In 2020, he worked on Michael Bloomberg's 2020 United States presidential campaign. He was later appointed the Director of Communications for The Lincoln Project, an organization of Republicans who stood against Donald Trump in the 2020 and 2024 United States presidential elections. He led the anti-Trump ads from fellow Republicans. Edwards was profiled on CBS's 60 Minutes about this work.

Following the 2020 election, Edwards later served as a senior digital advisor for Jon Ossoff's senate campaign in Georgia, and then in 2022, he was Communications Director for Nikki Fried's gubernatorial campaign in Florida. He has since interviewed Michigan state senator Mallory McMorrow, California Senator Adam Schiff and U.S. Secretary of Transportation Pete Buttigieg. He also writes a newsletter on Substack titled No Lies Detected.

Edwards was named by Wired as one of the influencers shaping the 2024 election, and was among the group of influencers invited to attend the State of the Union briefing at the White House by Joe Biden. He was one of 200 influencers invited to the 2024 Democratic National Convention. His work and analysis has been cited in outlets including The Washington Post, Washington Blade, CNN, The New Yorker, CBS News, Newsweek, and New York magazine.

In 2024, he created a political commentary YouTube channel, which has 1.32 million subscribers as of August 2026. The channel provides daily news updates with commentary and contains interviews with figures such as Representative Ro Khanna, Donald Trump's niece Mary L. Trump, Minnesota Governor Tim Walz, and Texas Democratic state representative and pastor James Talarico.

Snopes has traced several fabricated or unverified images to thumbnails on Edwards's YouTube channel. In December 2025, he told Snopes that he had used ChatGPT to create an image purporting to show Vice President JD Vance arguing with his wife, Usha, in a restaurant, as the thumbnail for an October 2025 video. Shortly after the United States Department of Justice released a batch of files related to Jeffrey Epstein on December 19, 2025, Edwards used an image of Donald Trump with a young girl, whose face was censored, as the thumbnail for a YouTube video titled "The FBI forgot to redact this" and also posted it on Twitter. Snopes reported "multiple signs the image was not authentic", said the earliest version it could find appeared on Edwards's accounts, and said the image's absence from the video indicated that it was "likely intended as clickbait". In September 2026, The Washington Post identified a thumbnail on Edwards's channel as one of the earliest known uses of AI-generated images purporting to show Trump kissing White House aide Natalie Harp; Edwards said his "thumbnail team found the image online" and did not create or alter it, but had not independently verified its source or that the woman pictured was Harp.

In August of 2026, on the Lib & Learn podcast, Edwards stated that he was a member of the Democratic Socialists of America's New York chapter.

== Personal life ==
Edwards is openly gay, stating that he came out at 16. He added: "Sexuality, for me, is just as important as if I'm left- or right-handed. It just doesn't really impact my life at all."

== Filmography ==
Year	Film	Functioned as
2011	The Real Housewives of Miami	Associate producer; Story producer
2013	Wicked Single	Associate producer; Story producer
