= Kimora: Life in the Fab Lane =

- Series title card
- Genre: Reality
- Starring: Kimora Lee Simmons
- Country of origin: United States
- No. of seasons: 4
- No. of episodes: 36

Production
- Executive producers: Banks Tarver; Ken Druckerman; Kimora Lee Simmons; Sarah Weidman
- Running time: 23 minutes
- Production company: Left/Right Productions

Original release
- Network: Style Network
- Release: August 5, 2007 – March 11, 2011

Related
- Kimora: House of Fab

Kimora: Life in the Fab Lane is an American reality television series on the Style Network. The series premiered on August 5, 2007, and ran on syndication on Style Network for four seasons.

A spin-off show, Kimora: House of Fab, debuted on January 23, 2013.

== Synopsis ==
The series follows Kimora Lee Simmons—featuring her family’s daily life, including her three children; Ming Lee Simmons, Aoki Lee Simmons and Kenzo Lee Hounsou, along with various people who work for Simmons. Along with an insight to her daily life, her boyfriend Djimon Hounsou is also shown. Her first husband, Russell Simmons, makes frequent appearances in the series too.

== Episodes ==
=== Season 1: 2007 ===
| Episode | Episode Title | First aired | Description |
|---|---|---|---|
| 1 | "Fierce and Fabulous" | August 5, 2007 | James P. Campbell, Kimora's Senior Director of Marketing and Advertising, has to put together an ad campaign in which James P. Campbell has to try to stay under the budget. |
| 2 | "Vanity Flair" | August 12, 2007 | Kimora decides what to wear to the Vanity Fair party; her KLS dress is given to Tichina Arnold; Kimora becomes the first woman to be on the cover of Source magazine. |
| 3 | "The Devil Wears Baby Phat" | August 19, 2007 | Kimora must give a speech in honor of her Designer of the Year award; a new assistant is hired; Kimora gets her Barbie doll. |
| 4 | "Kimora Knows She Cannes" | September 2, 2007 | Kimora holds a fashion show on her yacht in Cannes. |
| 5 | "Kimora: Life in the Fab Lane Secrets" | September 9, 2007 | Secrets are revealed from the season and Kimora gives inside advice and hints to be fabulous. |
| 6 | "Keepin' It Real Estate" | September 23, 2007 | Kimora is in search of a new home in Los Angeles with the help of James P Campbell; Mallory takes the girls to the beach and salon. |
| 7 | "In Store for Fabulosity" | September 30, 2007 | Kimora launches her new jewelry line at the Baby Phat store and hires a feng shui expert to bring in some harmony before the big event. |
| 8 | "Kiddie Couture" | October 7, 2007 | Ming and Aoki Lee design and model their fashion line at the Baby Phat show room. Designed by Head Designer Jerome LaMaar |

=== Season 2: 2008 ===
| Episode | Episode Title | First aired | Description |
|---|---|---|---|
| 1 | "My Super Fabulous 8th Birthday" | April 20, 2008 | Kimora plans Ming Lee's birthday party. Sandra adjusts to her new job as Brand Manager of Phat Farm while helping Kimora plan Ming's birthday party. |
| 2 | "Tooth or Consequences" | April 27, 2008 | Tensions run high the week before the Baby Phat fashion show. Kimora takes daughter, Aoki Lee to the dentist. |
| 3 | "On the Phatwalk" | May 4, 2008 | Young Designer Jerome LaMaar must figure out the issue with Kimora's Finale dress before the show starts. |
| 4 | "Smells Like Fabulosity" | May 18, 2008 | Kimora is filming a commercial for her new fragrance "Fabulosity" and decides to go green. |
| 5 | "Heels and Deals" | May 25, 2008 | |
| 6 | "A Mother's Workout is Never Done" | June 1, 2008 | Kimora decides to get in shape while designing a new line of clothes exclusively for JC Penney. |
| 7 | "High School Daze" | June 8, 2008 | Kimora goes back home to St. Louis to accept the key to the city. |
| 8 | "Take a Bow Wow" | June 22, 2008 | Christopher looks for a new family dog; fashion editor André Leon Talley help Kimora find the perfect gown. |
| 9 | "Growing Up Fabulous" | July 13, 2008 | |

=== Season 3: 2009-2010 ===
| Episode | Episode Title | Original Air Date | Description |
|---|---|---|---|
| 1 | "Model Behavior" | February 8, 2009 | Kimora designs a showroom while the girls learn responsibility. |
| 2 | "L.A. Exposure" | February 15, 2009 | Kimora photographs her men's line ad campaign while the girls take cooking lessons. |
| 3 | "10 Phat Years" | February 22, 2009 | Kimora recalls the road to her empire as she celebrates the 10th anniversary of Baby Phat with a fashion show and fabulous after party. |
| 4 | "Labor of Love" | March 21, 2010 | Follows Kimora during the last stages of pregnancy through delivery, nursery construction and teaching the girls about being big sisters. |
| 5 | "Dream House Under Construction" | March 28, 2010 | Kimora has a new dream house that's been under construction. And the time has come to consolidate all her stuff into this new house. Guest Stars: Tyra Banks and her mother (Carolyn) |
| 6 | "The Show Must Go On, Part 1" | April 4, 2010 | It's fashion week prep time in NYC but Kimora needs to be in LA where her girls are headed back to school. |
| 7 | "The Show Must Go On, Part 2" | April 11, 2010 | With the girls back to school, it's time to head to New York and get this Fashion Show done! |
| 8 | "No Pain, No Ad Campaign" | April 18, 2010 | Kimora follows her fashion show with an ad campaign. The problem is she JUST had a baby and isn't yet back in shape for being photographed so she's gotta shed some inches first. |
| 9 | "New Line, No Time!" | April 25, 2010 | Kimora's launching a fab new line for the Macy's Juniors Department. So she needs to find a manufacturer, designers and get the package launched in record time. |
| 10 | "British Invasion" | May 9, 2010 | Can Baby Phat expand its business globally? They'll have to head to London and conquer that first, if they can! Guest Star: Djimon Hounsou |

=== Season 4: 2011 ===
| Episode | Episode Title | Original Air Date | Description |
|---|---|---|---|
| 1 | Blowouts and Breakdowns | January 9, 2011 | Kimora throws Aoki Lee an 8th birthday party and combines it with a Baby Phat fashion show. Two girls from Make A Wish have their dream walk down the runway. Guest Star: Djimon Hounsou |
| 2 | Bling Sale | January 16, 2011 | Kimora has an estate sale at her New Jersey home while trying to release her sixth fragrance. In addition, she has decided to transform her reception area from drab to fab. |
| 3 | Hawaiian Wipeout | January 23, 2011 | Kimora heads to Hawaii for a Kouture by Kimora fashion show & some family fun. When a local promoter gets in over her head, there's a real fear that the show could end in disaster. Guest Star: Djimon Hounsou |
| 4 | Phat-Free Fashion Week | January 30, 2011 | Kimora moves on from Baby Phat and decides to attend New York's fashion week without her family. Meanwhile, Ming and Aoki plan a special surprise for their mommy's return. Guest Star: Russell Simmons |
| 5 | 100 Makeovers for 100 Women | February 13, 2011 | Kimora's team organizes 100 makeovers for 100 women to benefit the non-profit Dress for Success. Meanwhile, she's trapped in an emotional eating binge that has her calling for help. |
| 6 | A Pretty Face in The Crowd | February 20, 2011 | Kimora develops a skincare line. The team holds a casting call to find real women. Meanwhile, she brings Kenzo to work but discovers he is best entertained outside the office. |
| 7 | Drop It Like It's Hot | March 6, 2011 | Kimora is in the final push for the KLS Design Group, working with Flash Mob Producers. When rain threatens the day, will the event be finale or a flop? |
