= Leissner =

Leissner is a surname. Notable people with the surname include:

- Maria Leissner (born 1956), Swedish politician
- Tanner Leissner (born 1995), American basketball player
- Tim Leissner (born 1971), German-born investment banker and convicted felon
