= A Place in Time =

- Film poster
- Directed by: Angelina Jolie
- Produced by: Sam Connelly; Holly Goline
- Cinematography: Kent Harvey
- Edited by: Kurt Engfehr
- Music by: Wyclef Jean
- Release date: April 27, 2007 (Tribeca Film Festival)
- Running time: 70 minutes
- Country: United States
- Language: English

A Place in Time is a 2007 American documentary film directed by Angelina Jolie in her directorial debut.

== Synopsis ==
The film takes a look at the daily lives of people in more than two dozen countries around the world during the course of a week.

== Cast ==
- Hazel Armenante
- Nicole Barré
- Anne Hathaway
- Jude Law
- Djimon Hounsou
- Wyclef Jean
- Hilary Swank
- Angelina Jolie
- Bai Ling
- Olivier Martinez
- Jonny Lee Miller

== Production ==
It was Jolie's directorial debut.

== Release ==
On Friday, April 27, 2007, Jolie, Wyclef Jean, Jude Law, Hilary Swank, and others involved in the film debuted it at New York City's Tribeca Film Festival. The audience included over 600 New York high-school students. It was distributed through the National Education Association.
