= (Un)well =

Netflix documentary series

- Genre: Documentary series
- Country of origin: United States
- Original language: English
- No. of seasons: 1
- No. of episodes: 6

Production
- Executive producers: Ken Druckerman; Banks Tarver; Anneka Jones; Erica Sashin
- Production company: Left/Right Productions

Original release
- Network: Netflix
- Release: August 12, 2020

(Un)well is an American documentary series about the wellness industry. The series was produced by Left/Right Productions and premiered on August 12, 2020, on Netflix. Reviewers point out the episodes tend to give more weight to enthusiastic testimonials than to expert advice, painting a positive picture of treatments that are often ineffective or dangerous.

== Summary ==
Through interviews with practitioners, consumers and experts, the series questions the efficacy and safety of six treatments offered by the "wellness" industry. Presented without a narrator, the audience is left to make up their own minds about the information presented.

== Episodes ==
No.	Title	Directed by	Original release date
1	"Essential oils"	Unknown	August 12, 2020
Are essential oils a remedy, or just a billion-dollar multilevel marketing scheme?
2	"Tantric sex"	Unknown	August 12, 2020
Can tantric sex live up to the hype, despite the potential for abuse?
3	"Bulking up with breast milk"	Unknown	August 12, 2020
The safety and ethics of breast milk for bodybuilding
4	"Fasting"	Unknown	August 12, 2020
The risks of fasting as a weight-loss technique
5	"Ayahuasca"	Unknown	August 12, 2020
Using a shamanic hallucinogen as therapy
6	"Bee sting therapy"	Unknown	August 12, 2020
Therapeutic considerations of bee venom

== Reception ==
Reviewers give credit to the series for exposing some of the worst abuse of the wellness industry. However, the series suffers from false balance, drowning the advice of experts in lengthy testimonies by sympathetic practitioners of alternative medicine and their clients.

At CNN, Brian Lowry points to the interviews with scientists and journalists sprinkled through the episodes as an explanation of how people can be manipulated by those who seek to sell treatments "more rooted in faith than science". It's also a commentary on the poor state of the healthcare system, with people looking for quick fixes elsewhere. Lowry quotes Steven Novella's warning that the promises of the wellness industry are often nothing more than false hopes.

Writing for Science-Based Medicine, Harriet Hall gives the series "two thumbs down". She believes it fails in its attempt to present a balanced view of the issues discussed: "The people who made (Un)well seem to believe testimonials and hearsay are good evidence and are just as credible as scientific studies, perhaps even more so." Hall worries that viewers, seduced by slickly-produced testimonials, will be motivated to try the treatment presented, even though it is likely ineffective and possibly dangerous.

Jonathan Jarry of the Office for Science and Society says the series "observes but never judges, and this impartial approach causes it to commit the sin of false balance." The advice of experts presented throughout the episodes tends to be drowned out by anecdotes of enthusiastic patients. The show does present people who were severely harmed by pseudoscientific treatments, but always goes back to a practitioner who appears to adopt a more benign approach. In the end, for Jarry, (Un)Well "warns against extremes in the search for health but allows so many pseudoscientific claims to stand unchecked, it practically endorses many of the practices it aims to denounce."

Writing for The Daily Beast, Laura Bradley worried that despite using interviews with genuine experts, the series risks promoting the conspiracy theorists and health gurus it also presents: "As much as (Un)Well clearly wants to serve as an even-handed guide into the strange world of wellness, the show's insistence on letting each side speak for itself without tipping its hand means all it's really doing is providing a platform for quackery and false hope." While the show clearly identifies problems with some companies (Young Living gets the harsh treatment), others are let off easy. She also thought the material presented would fit better into a 30-minute format rather than the 50 minutes per episode used.

Writing for Culture Whisper, Sarah Joan Ross gave the series three stars out of five. The series "does effectively expose a few of the darker sides of the wellness industry", but the scientific analysis does not go very deep. The testimonies of clients who tried the various treatments gives energy to the episodes, but they don't have the humor and production value of a series like The Goop Lab.
