= Small Town Security =

American reality television series (2012-2014)

- Genre: Reality
- Country of origin: United States
- Original language: English
- No. of seasons: 3
- No. of episodes: 24

Production
- Executive producers: Ken Druckerman; Banks Tarver
- Running time: 30 minutes
- Production company: Left/Right Productions

Original release
- Network: AMC
- Release: July 15, 2012 – June 24, 2014

Small Town Security is an American reality television series produced by Ken Druckerman and Banks Tarver from Left/Right Productions for the AMC network. The unscripted show focused on a small, family-owned, private security company called JJK Security, located in the North Georgia city of Ringgold.

The show, green-lit along with Comic Book Men, was picked up for a season of eight half-hour episodes and premiered after the season 5 premiere of Breaking Bad on July 15, 2012. A second season of eight half-hour episodes started on May 9, 2013. The eight-episode third season premiered on May 6, 2014.

On October 10, 2014, AMC announced that Small Town Security had been canceled and would not be returning for a fourth season.

== Cast ==
Promotional poster of the cast: (clockwise) Brian Taylor, Dennis Croft, Joan Koplan with Lambchop, Christa Stephens, and Irwin Koplan

- Joan Koplan (The Chief): Head of JJK Security and former actress/public access television host. Joan Koplan died on March 31, 2016.
- Dennis Starr Croft (The Captain): Joan's live-in lieutenant who later became Captain
- Irwin Koplan (The Major): Joan's husband died June 14, 2024.
- Brian Taylor (Office Manager): The company's detective, process server, and business manager
- Christa Stephens (Secretary): The office secretary who is also a "licensed cosmetologist"
- Lambchop: Joan's feisty 14-year-old chihuahua
- Charlotte: Lambchop's replacement, after Lambchop became ill and had to be euthanized

== Production ==
In a July 2012 interview with Hollywood.com, series star and JJK Security owner Joan Koplan explained how the series came to television: "I've had people coming into my office for a long time saying how crazy it is and how it should be a reality show. I knew Matt Saul from William Morris Endeavor [talent agency], so I called him and asked if he'd be interested in doing something. He said we'd have to make a DVD, so I did that. After he saw it, he said, 'Yeah, I see what you mean, that's a crazy place.' About four days later, he calls and tells me that Ken Druckerman from Left/Right Productions in New York City is interested in it. I almost crapped my pants." When Joan was asked about audience reaction to Lieutenant Croft's transgender secret being revealed on her public access show and, subsequently, on network television, she said: "Keep in mind, this is the Bible Belt. Some people—well, nobody was rude, I will tell you that. But some people felt very sorry for him. But there was a lot of understanding. I got very few calls that were derogatory." In an interview with The Advocate, Croft also responded about the feedback: "I haven't really felt a change. Those who know me and about me haven't flinched. I found that surprising. It has not been what I expected of others, and I see that folks are not the typical haters of my kind that I thought. The South has grown up from the childish games of prejudice."

== Reception ==
=== Critical reception ===
Small Town Security has received mixed reviews from critics. Boston.com blogger Frazier Moore observed that the series "bristles with authenticity", adding, "Part of the secret to the show's success is this: The characters regularly own up to their quirkiness, but without flaunting it for the cameras. They share without showing off. And what they reveal is much more than stereotypes. This makes the viewer not a voyeur, but a privileged onlooker." Pete Vonder Haar of the Houston Press stated there was "nothing redeeming" about the series, calling it "depressing" and he added: "AMC seems to think it has something 'quirky' and 'off the wall.' In reality (no pun intended) it feels like something the North Korean government broadcasts to sap its citizens' will to live."

In the New York Magazine's "Approval Matrix" for the week of May 27, 2013, the series was given a "lowbrow brilliant" rating, stating that it was "regularly enjoyable."

=== Awards ===
In 2014, Small Town Security was nominated for a GLAAD Media Award for Outstanding Reality Program for fairly and accurately representing the LGBT community and its relevant issues. It was also nominated in 2013.

== Series overview ==
| Season | Episodes | Originally released | |
| Season | Episodes | First released | Last released |
|---|---|---|---|
| 1 | 8 | July 15, 2012 | September 2, 2012 |
| 2 | 8 | May 9, 2013 | June 27, 2013 |
| 3 | 8 | May 6, 2014 | June 24, 2014 |

== Episodes ==
=== Season 1 (2012) ===
| No. overall | No. in season | Title | Original release date | U.S. viewers (million) |
|---|---|---|---|---|
| 1 | 1 | "Joan Koplan's Forum" | July 15, 2012 | 1.02 |
Joan reveals that she used to have her own talk show on a public access station, but it was canceled for her "foul language." Brian and Dennis convince her to get her show back. The station owner allows it, as long as she "keeps it clean." On the new show, Joan plays an old video segment in which it is revealed that Dennis used to be a woman named Denise.
| 2 | 2 | "The Testosterone Triangle" | July 22, 2012 | N/A |
A lethargic Irwin drives around town, intent on soliciting local businesses to use the company's services, but instead buys a new pair of shoes. Later, he sees a TV commercial promoting how testosterone can help with exhaustion. Intrigued, he begins taking it. Continuing to search for new business, he then meets with a Chattanooga Convention Center representative, who declines JJK's services. However, after Irwin charms him with stories about a shared alma mater, he secures a promised recommendation when extra security is needed for special events. Meanwhile, Dennis tells Joan that he believes they were married in a previous life when she was "an Egyptian princess." When Irwin shares news of a potential client, Joan suggests having sex with him. Dennis shrugs off any jealousy by saying Irwin is "this life's husband" for him.
| 3 | 3 | "Dr. Sandy and the Swear Jar" | July 29, 2012 | 0.42 |
Irwin asks executive coach Dr. Sandy McKenzie to tour the security business and offer suggestions about improving its professionalism, which Joan is not happy with, since it is her company. The doctor meets with each employee to critique them and get their perspectives. All employees comment on Irwin's hoarding problem. Joan's excessive use of profanity is also critiqued. After seeing that Joan chooses not to change her language, the doctor focuses on Irwin's "disgusting" office. It is revealed that not only is the office cluttered, but it is also a storage unit and the Koplan basement. After several personal items are uncovered in the clean-up, Irwin postpones the process for two months. Joan remains skeptical. In the episode, she also reveals that she has Parkinson's disease and dances as a form of physical therapy.
| 4 | 4 | "Christa Pista, P.I." | August 5, 2012 | N/A |
Christa decides she wants to be a private investigator. A skeptical Joan thinks the idea is just a whim. Irwin does not think Christa could handle the long hours of surveillance that is required of the job. Croft counters by saying that there are "female urinal things" for those situations. Brian also thinks Christa should be given the chance. Joan helps her with the instruction manual, Croft instructs her at the gun range, Brian teaches her about surveillance, and Irwin teaches her "the art of lying." She passes all tests and Joan approves her apprenticeship, but adds that Christa needs to "learn not to talk so much." Meanwhile, Irwin's first cousin Neil visits JJK. He amuses everyone except for Christa, whom he refers to as "double wide." In retaliation for the comment, Christa and Croft pour water on his usual chair as he is parking his car the next time he visits. He does not notice the wet cushion and sits down, wetting the seat of his pants, and is ridiculed for soiling himself.
| 5 | 5 | "Sneak Attack!" | August 12, 2012 | N/A |
It's promotion time for JJK Security's employees. Most of the security guards are promoted after Lt. Croft tests them on the job. Joan had planned to promote Lt. Croft to captain, but changed her mind after he attempts to kiss her in a bathroom. Irwin keeps his promise to clean out his office and the rest are surprised when they are able to see his clean floor. Joan, however, predicts the mess will return within a month.
| 6 | 6 | "The Tornado Effect" | August 19, 2012 | 0.63 |
Joan reveals that she is dieting and Lt. Croft becomes her coach. While riding with Croft, she notes a terrible smell in the car. Croft informs her that he has not had a shower in three weeks and only takes "bird baths" in the office sink, since he has no other way to bathe. He is later asked where he lived before moving into JJK's office and takes them to an empty lot across the street. His house was destroyed a year ago during a tornado in Ringgold, thus Joan allowed him to stay in the office. A shower is installed there, although no one believes he will use it. Christa presents him with a gift basket containing bathing products and others also gift him. He later takes a shower. Irwin gives Joan a bicycle to help her exercise.
| 7 | 7 | "Romancing the Joan" | August 26, 2012 | N/A |
Irwin's cousin Neil visits the Koplan house where Irwin talks about Neil's wild life. Later, Neil visits the office. Brian says that Neil only comes to the office because he is hungry. Joan laughs that Neil loves food so much, he calls everything from Chinese food to spaghetti "gorgeous." Neil finishes a sandwich then departs. A week later, Neil dies from heart failure. In the funeral procession, women dressed in fur coats ride in a car and wave to passersby. After the funeral, the JJK team reminisces about Neil. Brian asks about the ladies in fur, to which Irwin states Neil's daughter thought this would be a fitting tribute to her father, who was such a lothario. In honor of the deceased, they hang Neil's photo above the chair where he always sat. Thinking about his own mortality, Irwin looks to rekindle his relationship with Joan and surprises her with ballroom dancing lessons. They later profess their love to each other at a scenic overlook, although they are at odds on the subject of Lt. Croft.
| 8 | 8 | "Lieutenant Croft's Release" | September 2, 2012 | N/A |
Irwin and Joan return to the airwaves with her public access forum. At first, no one calls in. Brian suggests they change their show topics to what would interest the public more and Croft suggests Joan publicize the forum in other forms of media. After making the changes, the phone lines heat up, especially when the first new topic is about love and sex. Joan, Irwin, and Croft later privately discuss their "love triangle." Croft relents by saying he will honor the Koplan's marriage, but still compliments Joan. The three go to a club so Croft can mingle with other people. Meanwhile, Christa and Brian come up with a clever way to serve a subpoena.

=== Season 2 (2013) ===
| No. overall | No. in season | Title | Original release date | U.S. viewers (million) |
|---|---|---|---|---|
| 9 | 1 | "The Wicked Witch of Georgia" | May 9, 2013 | 0.13 |
Lt. Croft's 45th birthday is coming up. Croft hopes to become legally male before the big day, marking it as his "first true birthday." On patrol with Joan, Croft says he enjoys taking care of her, but asks her to show him more kindness. She admits that she resents Croft for being in love with her because "I'm not into a half man and a half woman." They also discuss Croft's birthday. Croft says he needs a new fake penis, since three others "didn't hold up to his beating." Because of the show, JJK has lost numerous accounts, so Irwin decides to boost efforts to get new business, but he needs help and Christa becomes his new sales and marketing protege. Brian helps Christa improve her grammar, and Irwin trains her in the "secrets of selling" and has her listen to an audiotape called "Say Goodbye to Your Southern Accent." Finally, Irwin takes Christa around town to make cold calls. At the end of the day, Irwin is pleased that Christa never got turned away. The team celebrates the birthday with a penis-shaped cake. Joan privately gives Lt. Croft a card that declares, "I-O-U one penis." Lt. Croft tears up, explaining "this means she's accepting me."
| 10 | 2 | "Elite Force!" | May 16, 2013 | 0.23 |
Out on patrol, Joan and Lt. Croft complain about clients who are too cheap to pay for JJK. Croft says if he had his way, the guards would have mandatory training so the clients get better service. At the office, Lt. Croft notes that Joan has fallen off her diet and she says Parkinson's disease is affecting her mobility, so she can't dance to stay in shape any more. Lt. Croft holds the first training session outside of the JJK office, during which a large man steals a bicycle from right in front of them. The guards fail the challenge, incorrectly describing the culprit. He then has them complete an obstacle course while blindfolded, causing them to stumble into walls and poles, and go to a karate studio and learn hand-to-hand combat using their flashlights. They play a shooting simulation game at the local high school to teach them when they should use lethal force. Next, they must navigate a paintball course without weapons while Joan and Lt. Croft shoot at them from above. Meanwhile, Irwin goes to an electronics store to get new speakers for Joan so she'll "start dancing again." He and Joan also visit the doctor and successfully get a higher dosage of medicine. Later, the team cheers Joan on as she walks up and down the driveway. Irwin surprises her with the new stereo system, complete with a light and fog machine, and she dances to the music.
| 11 | 3 | "JJK for Sale" | May 23, 2013 | 0.23 |
At Joan and Irwin's house, Joan reveals that Irwin's hoarding has gotten bad again. He sorts through some things, looking for items with the JJK Security logo, hoping to sell them on eBay as the show, in his opinion, has been successful. In the garage, Joan sits listening to music in her car to escape her "filthy house." She says that owning fancy cars makes her feel like somebody. At the JJK office, Irwin decides he's going to put Joan's Ford Mustang on eBay without telling her. Brian warns him. Christa, Brian, and Irwin take pictures of the JJK memorabilia and post them on eBay. Irwin also puts an autographed "poop stick" on eBay. He tells Joan that he's put the Mustang on eBay, and she gets angry. Lt. Croft says Irwin has no right to do it because it's Chief's car, but Irwin proclaims it to be a company car. Back home, Irwin apologizes to Joan for getting "caught up in the eBay thing." He also tells her that he put the Mustang on eBay for $50,000, and Joan warms up to the idea, saying, "Jay Leno would get it in a minute." The eBay auctions end and most of the items get zero bids, including the Mustang. Irwin's poop stick is the only thing that sells, for $8.73. Joan says the Mustang wasn't marketed properly so she has Lt. Croft take pictures of Joan standing next to the car. She also agrees to sell a date along with the Mustang, if it'll help sell the car.
| 12 | 4 | "A Starr Is Born" | May 30, 2013 | 0.15 |
Lt. Croft meets with a lawyer to discuss legally changing his name from Denise Starr Croft to Dennis Starr. He learns he has to file notice of his name change in the local paper and give the public 30 days to file an objection. Out on patrol, Joan and Croft argue about her not being able to accept him as a man. She says it's also hard for her because she's lost a female friend. He says he still knows "all the female stuff." Outside the courthouse, the entire group congratulates Dennis Starr on his name change, which is now official. Croft hosts a ceremony around a flaming trashcan to lay to rest Denise. He throws away several of his old feminine items, as well as his old photo ID card. Crying, Joan announces that she's decided to promote Dennis from Lieutenant to Captain, and presents him with a new jacket with "Captain Starr" on the back.
| 13 | 5 | "Old Family, New Member" | June 6, 2013 | N/A |
Irwin drives to Dalton, Georgia, where he grew up. He stops momentarily at his brother Alan's home. They stopped talking years ago because of "family issues" and different lifestyles. Joan later explains that the cause of the tension between Alan and Irwin was that she borrowed money from their mother, which Irwin says "poisoned" the family relationship. When the brothers meet, Irwin starts to cry and says their parents "would roll over in their graves" if they knew about the brothers fighting. Alan agrees they need to make amends and also cries. Joan meets Alan and his wife and apologizes for borrowing the money. Alan accepts her apology. As the two couples part ways, Joan cries and says she feels good that she got part of her family back. Back at the office, Captain Starr shows off his driver's license with his new name and gender designation. He mentions that he's ordered his new prosthetic penis. Days later, the prosthetic arrives in the mail. Joan asks to see it, and says it feels "real."
| 14 | 6 | "Inipi" | June 13, 2013 | N/A |
Capt. Starr clips long bamboo stalks outside the JJK office to make a semi-traditional sweat lodge. Brian, Irwin and Starr have made plans for a guys-only weekend camping trip together. Brian reminds a concerned Joan that they're going to a fully furnished cabin, and it's only for one night. Christa suggests to Joan that they have a girls' night. Brian takes Irwin on a geocaching scavenger hunt, while Starr builds his sweat lodge with the bamboo and a tarp outside the cabin. Later, the men sit in the lodge as Starr bangs a drum and leads Irwin and Brian in a chant. Meanwhile, Christa tries to keep Joan entertained during the girls' night by demonstrating how to use a stripper pole. Joan slides up and down the pole. On the ride back the next day, the guys realize their trip is the first time Joan has been away from all three of them at the same time. At JJK, Joan is describing her night to them, including her turn on the stripper pole. She also explains that the girls "forced her" to get a spray tan. When she asks what the guys did on their camping trip, they won't tell. She starts listing off the bad things that could have happened and the guys laugh at her.
| 15 | 7 | "All Hands on Deck" | June 20, 2013 | N/A |
At the UCTV station, Irwin says he is tired of the Joan Koplan Forum. Judy talks privately with Irwin and suggests a variety format like a real late-night show, complete with a monologue, band, and "great guests". Irwin agrees. Later, Joan and Irwin prepare for their new show. He introduces the new and improved Joan Koplan Variety Hour at UCTV; she introduces her first guest, a Bret Michaels impersonator. She asks how he lived through a cerebral hemorrhage, not realizing he's not actually Michaels. He corrects her and she states that "it would have been nice if somebody would have told me that." Brian and his girlfriend Bonnie arrive at a dock. She thinks they are going on a geocaching scavenger hunt. While she is looking for the last item, Brian gets it out of a bush and opens it to reveal an engagement ring. He tells her to look at a bridge, from which a "Will You Marry Me" banner is draped. The two embrace. Meanwhile, the company has been hired as security for the local event, "Masquerave". While there, Christa's car is involved in a hit and run, but she is able chase the guy down and hold him. Brian says Christa may yet make a good security guard. Although exhausted, Joan and Irwin arrive at the rave and he does his first-ever Jello shot.
| 16 | 8 | "The Man Makes the Suit" | June 27, 2013 | N/A |
Starr, dressed in a new suit, goes to have a mammogram and surgery consultation to have his chest reconstructed from female to male. At JJK, Irwin asks what a mammogram is, so Christa explains the procedure. Starr returns and reports that his breasts are healthy enough to be removed. Joan and Irwin reminisce about when Starr, then Denise, looked like Sharon Stone. Both agree that Dennis was very attractive as a woman, but Dennis says that it "wasn't him." Irwin gives Christa a stack of good sales leads for her to follow up on, but after her first day of calls, she admits that it's difficult. Brian tells her that she should be helping him clean the office more, and she wouldn't mind something that began cleaner than the office's current state. The two decide to hire a cleaning crew while Starr, Joan and Irwin are in Atlanta for the surgery. Arriving back to a clean office, Joan is happy. Brian asks how Starr is feeling with his new male chest, and Starr calls it a "significant change." Weeks later, the office has a barbecue. Starr first shows off his flat chest in a white tank top, then later emerges in a new uniform. Joan is the most impressed. Starr says that he wishes he could share his happiness at that moment with "anyone else who's ever felt restricted ... so they can feel the same thing."

=== Season 3 (2014) ===
| No. overall | No. in season | Title | Original release date | U.S. viewers (million) |
|---|---|---|---|---|
| 17 | 1 | "Someone's Got the Meatball" | May 6, 2014 | N/A |
Joan describes a violent scenario where she and Dennis battle armed robbers. Dennis interrupts, saying that her scenario is not a good plot for the future JJK training video meant to prevent the type of situations she describes. Later, Dennis, Brian, and staff member Lt. Turner hold auditions among friends and employees and cast a team to film the video. Joan loves the final product. Meanwhile, she and her friend Wayne record a song, developed by Joan, called "Speecy Spicy Meatballs". After many takes, Dennis provides Joan some direction. She ultimately pronounces it "a hit".
| 18 | 2 | "The Dragon Takes Flight" | May 13, 2014 | N/A |
After having his breasts removed, Dennis wants to start dating and asks advice from his friend Sherry Dee Allen, who paints a mural in his living quarters to give it a woman's touch. They also go on a practice date, where she teaches him proper topical etiquette, and he admits to still being in love with Joan. Meanwhile, Brian and Christa help him set up an online dating profile so he can meet women, but before an actual date, he caters to Joan. He and his date play miniature golf, where they meet Irwin, who is upset with the hobby after abandoning regular golf, fishing, solitaire and kite-flying to help him relax. Things go well, and Dennis and his date make future plans.
| 19 | 3 | "Lambchop's Last Bite" | May 20, 2014 | N/A |
Dennis has found JJK some new business — security for a mud-bogging event, where participants ride trucks through mud. Christa, who regularly rides ATVs with her mother, wants to enter the contest. At the event, the team, disappointed with the turnout, only encounters a rogue mouse. Christa gets stuck in the mud on her turn and is removed by a bulldozer. Meanwhile, Lambchop becomes ill. Distraught, Joan asks Dennis to take the dog to the vet to put her down. Later, Irwin helps Joan find a new dog. They adopt Charlotte. At the Koplan house, the team says goodbye to Lambchop and eat hamburgers, her favorite food. Attempting to lighten their moods, they all attend a roller derby match, including Charlotte.
| 20 | 4 | "Heady Times, Part 1" | May 27, 2014 | N/A |
Brian tells Irwin that JJK Security has lost a major client. Brian explores other job opportunities in case JJK fails, while Dennis stays optimistic by spending his own money on promotional fliers and an employee appreciation day. Meanwhile, Joan is not interested in her show and does not respond well to two new co-hosts, including Christa's friend Ken, who has four personalities. Joan also finds it difficult expressing herself, and the staff worries she's off her Parkinson's medication and urges her to see a doctor. To help with the show, Christa first takes Joan shopping, then recruits comedian Gilbert Gottfried, who she met at a comedy club, as the new co-host. However, when she and Gilbert arrive to film the show, Joan never shows up and Gilbert hosts solo. Simultaneously, Brian and Dennis worry that they cannot reach Irwin, who they need to seek out new business for JJK. Back in the studio, Christa receives a phone call that someone is in the hospital.
| 21 | 5 | "Heady Times, Part 2" | June 3, 2014 | N/A |
Joan has been admitted to the hospital after doctors discovered fluid in her brain. Irwin calls Christa to tell her Joan has a tumor and will need brain surgery. Later, Irwin, distraught, waits for the operation to end. He breaks down crying when informed she is out of surgery. When she is brought home five days later, she is greeted by Brian, Christa and Charlotte. Two weeks later, Joan suffers from side effects of her surgery and demands to go to a fancy hotel. Irwin takes her to one near Con Nooga, a fan convention where JJK is providing security. He attempts to placate Joan with novelty wigs and food, but she remains unhappy. Exasperated, he calls Dennis, who arrives with JJK guards and characters from the convention. This lightens her mood.
| 22 | 6 | "Watch Dogs" | June 10, 2014 | N/A |
The team believe Joan needs rest now that she's undergoing radiation treatment. She only agrees to stay home after Dennis installs remote cameras in the office so she monitor activity. Meanwhile, the business is in financial distress and Christa's hours are cut in half. Dennis asks Winston Cavendish, who played McGruff the Crime Dog, to help. In costume, Cavendish performs for the guards and they brainstorm a child safety outreach program. Joan hates the idea, demanding a Chihuahua mascot instead. The new mascot, Nippy, is played by Christa, who doesn't like outside supplemental work. Joan returns to work after getting some rest.
| 23 | 7 | "The Belly of the Beast" | June 17, 2014 | N/A |
Dennis prepares for an overnight caving expedition with his officers to teach them about conquering fear, but is worried about leaving Joan. He leaves Brian responsible for her. In the caves, he asks his officers to crawl through small spaces then pretends to have a meltdown himself. Officer Taylor takes charge of the situation, to Dennis's pleasure. They camp deep in the caves and discuss fear. Meanwhile, Joan has been diagnosed with diabetes. Brian and Irwin throw away unhealthy food from the Koplans' refrigerator. He then cooks her a meal that she refuses to eat. Later, Christa brings her juice made of kale and seaweed, which she also finds repulsive. Dennis arrives to find Brian and Irwin cleaning out the office fridge and ignoring Joan's demands for her usual snacks. Initially, he wants to give her candy but realizes he needs to overcome his fear of disappointing her and deny her what she wants for her own good.
| 24 | 8 | "Hail to the Chief" | June 24, 2014 | N/A |
Joan recuperates from surgery beside a Beverly Hills, California, pool. Dennis tends to her while Irwin goes swimming and later eats to relieve his stress. Dennis admits she has slowed down, but, since he believes she's from another universe and is protecting him from alien attacks, he isn't worried. After returning from California, they attend Christa's and Brian's party to honor JJK's 30th anniversary. Brian and Christa perform a sketch as Irwin and Joan, respectively, in 1984, when the company was founded. Joan is happy, but quickly tires. As the party winds down, Dennis cannot find her nor Irwin anywhere. Confused, he goes outside to smoke and sees a light, like a shooting star, flash overhead in the sky.
