= Kimora: House of Fab =

- Genre: Reality
- Starring: Kimora Lee Simmons; Adam Goldenberg; Don Ressler; Lianca Lyons; Johnny Anastacio; Alyson Wilson; Kimberly Tobman; Lesley Holmes
- Country of origin: United States
- Original language: English
- No. of seasons: 1
- No. of episodes: 8

Production
- Executive producers: Banks Tarver; Ken Druckerman; Kimora Lee Simmons; Rachel Tung; Sarah Weidman; Sitarah Pendelton
- Running time: 40 to 43 minutes
- Production company: Left/Right Productions

Original release
- Network: Style Network
- Release: January 23 – March 13, 2013

Related
- Kimora: Life in the Fab Lane

Kimora: House of Fab is an American reality television series on the Style Network that debuted on January 23, 2013. Kimora: House of Fab chronicles the day-to-day life at JustFab, an online fashion website. Simmons was hired in 2011 after the company raised $33 million in first round capital. The series focuses solely on Simmons's career with the company, rather than her home life as shown in Kimora: Life in the Fab Lane.

== Cast and characters ==
=== Main cast ===
- Kimora Lee Simmons — the President of Fab
- Adam Goldenberg and Don Ressler — the Big Bosses
- Lianca Lyons — the Kimora Whisperer
- Johnny Anastacio — the Drama King
- Alyson Wilson — the Know-It-All
- Kimberly Tobman — the Perfectionist
- Lesley Holmes — the Trend Spotter

=== Recurring cast ===
- Sandra Diaz
- Sarah Marsh
- Rose Montoya
- Jessica Flores
- Ashley Hildebrandt
- Angela Fink

== Episodes ==
No.	Title	Original release date
1	"Pledge Allegiance to the Fab"	January 23, 2013
The public relations staff prepares a launch party for stylist Jessica Paster and her shoe line.
2	"Miss Labeled"	January 30, 2013
Kimora gets interviewed by OK! magazine. Ashley and Sarah assist Elle and Blair Fowler for an upcoming awards show. The staff at the office compete to compose a viral video to promote the company.
3	"Crack Is Whack"	February 6, 2013
Lesley is assigned to develop the company's newest denim line. Johnny wants to get a promotion. The design team comes together to create the fall advertisement.
4	"Multiple Shoegasms"	February 13, 2013
Leslie foretells the latest spring fashion trends and her co-workers analyze her love life. The team gets together to create a risqué advertisement.
5	"Gaudy by Nature"	February 20, 2013
Johnny's personal life is starting to interfere with work. Elle and Blair Fowler work with Kimora on a photo shoot.
6	"Getting the Boot"	February 27, 2013
The crew gets together to sell shoes in order to raise breast cancer awareness. Kimora thinks the company should start selling dresses. Lianca is being closely watched as everyone notices her declining work ethic.
7	"Studs and Stilettos"	March 6, 2013
Avril Lavigne partners with JustFab to create her line of shoes and accessories. Kimora prepares everyone for an upcoming commercial shoot.
8	"Fashion Week Virgin"	March 13, 2013
Kimora takes the staff with her to New York Fashion Week for a fun-filled adventure. Later, Don informs everyone about the future of JustFab.
