= Phat Farm =

Clothing brand

Phat Farm is a clothing brand that was founded by Russell Simmons in 1992. Phat Farm was known for its bold and colorful designs that married classic preppy style with hip-hop culture.

== History ==
Phat Farm was established in 1992 by Russell Simmons, co-founder of Def Jam Recordings. The brand was initially a men's clothing line and sold clothing items such as T-shirts, jeans, and jackets.

The brand's early success was attributed to its association with hip-hop culture, which was growing in popularity at the time. Phat Farm became a recognizable name in urban fashion and expanded its product offerings to include women's clothing as well.

In 2004, Phat Farm was sold to the Kellwood Company for a reported $140 million. Despite the change in ownership, the brand continued to develop and remained popular with hip-hop fans and urban fashion enthusiasts until 2010, when the excess of early 2000's popular culture became passé.

== Legacy and future ==
Phat Farm's popularity began to decline in the late 2000s as the urban fashion market shifted away from excess towards more minimalist and streetwear-inspired styles. In 2007, Simmons announced that he would be stepping down as CEO of Phat Fashions, the parent company of Phat Farm, to focus on other business ventures. In 2002, former wife and business partner of Russell Simmons, Kimora Lee Simmons, reacquired the Phat Farm label. In the holiday season of 2022, Phat Farm was relaunched as part of a capsule collection with American fashion retailer Forever 21.
