= In Search of Voodoo: Roots to Heaven =

2018 Beninese documentary film

- Promotional release poster
- Directed by: Djimon Hounsou
- Written by: Djimon Hounsou; Douglas Thompson
- Produced by: Djimon Hounsou; Eric McGaw
- Cinematography: Kwaku Altson; Polo Orisha
- Edited by: Douglas Thompson
- Production company: Fanaticus Entertainment
- Release date: 10 March 2018 (US)
- Running time: 65 minutes
- Country: Benin
- Language: English

In Search of Voodoo: Roots to Heaven is a 2018 Beninese biographical documentary film directed by actor Djimon Hounsou, in his directorial debut. The film is based on true events from Hounsou's life and focuses on personal, cultural, and spiritual tales of Voodoo in West Africa. Among other elements, the film features two ceremonies honoring the water spirit Mami Wata in Grand-Popo, Benin.

== International screenings ==
- 10 March 2018 – Miami International Film Festival (world premiere)
- 10 and 12 June 2018 – Zanzibar International Film Festival
- 16 February 2019 – Toronto Black Film Festival
- 9 February 2018 – Pan African Film Festival
- 9 March 2019 – New African Film Festival

== Reception ==
Guy Lodge of Variety wrote that, "if [In Search of Voodoo: Roots to Heaven] has a few unresolved edges, it makes a persuasive case for a thorough re-examination of its subject: Working inside out from his personal affiliation with West African Voodooism to a broader study of the culture it has bred across the diaspora, this 65-minute film is vivid and heartfelt when it stays close to home, but could stand more anthropological analysis in the long view."
