= Hawaii Life =

American reality television series

- Genre: Reality show
- Original language: English

Production
- Executive producers: Ken Druckerman; Banks Tarver
- Running time: 30 minutes
- Production company: Left/Right Productions

Original release
- Network: HGTV
- Release: January 1, 2013 – present

Hawaii Life is a reality show on HGTV.

== Plot ==
The show follows a company called Hawaii Life Real Estate Brokers as their agents work with different people who move to Hawaii looking to buy a home. The show takes place on one of the four major islands in Hawaii: Hawaii, Maui, Oahu, and Kauai.

== Episodes ==
=== Season One ===
2013

1. Indianapolis to Dreamy Kauai (After landing a job, an Indiana couple drops everything and moves to Kauai.)
2. Alaska Family Moves to Kauai (Leaving a large Alaskan home, a family of eight seeks a new life on Kauai.)
3. Upgrade from Colorado to Kauai (A Colorado family looks for a house in Kauai to escape the harsh winters.)
4. Oregon to Maui for Scuba Fun (After long Oregon winters, a scuba diver moves to Maui to live her passion.)
5. Washington to Kona, Big Island (Parents with twins upsize and upgrade from Washington to the Big Island.)
6. Life Swap from Japan to Hawaii (Young family moves from Tokyo to the Big Island to fulfill their dream.)
7. A Surfer Returns to the Beach (A pro-surfer looks for a home for his growing family & near some big waves.)
8. Rainy Washington to Sunny Maui (Too many summers in rainy Washington, a couple changes to sunny Maui.)
9. Rambler Lands on Big Island (Young father has lived everywhere, but wants to settle on the Big Island.)
10. Moving From Cali To Big Island (Family searches for a Big Island home to enjoy all of Hawaii's activities.)
11. Multi-generational on Oahu (New parents are looking for a home to fit them and their mother-in-law.)
12. Maui Home For Hula Dancer (A hula dancer looks for a comfortable home for her and her two children.)
13. Newlyweds in Honolulu, Oahu (Newlyweds seek their first apartment in Honolulu with island amenities.)

=== Season Two ===
2013 - 2014

- Goodbye snowy Canada, hello sunny Big Island
- A Family moves from Pittsburgh to Princeville in search of a laidback lifestyle
- Family Moves from New Hampshire to Kauai to live the classic Hawaii lifestyle and hit the water everyday
- A young couple leaves the hustle and bustle of Honolulu seeking the quieter parts of Oahu
- A Baltimore couple moves to Hawaii to start exciting new careers in the Big Island
- A couple moves from Buffalo to the Big Island in hopes of a change of pace and to live off the land
- Former US Air Force Physician relocates his family to Kauai for laidback lifestyle
- A single Mother looks for a home for herself and her daughter in Kauai
- A young, active couple house hunts in Oahu for a home where they can start a family
- Single Mother of three on Oahu looks for a smaller condo in Oahu as her grown kids head off to college
- Maui native moves back home after spending a few years on the mainland
- A couple searches for their dream home on Maui that would double as a bed and breakfast
- So long Florida, Aloha Maui

=== Season Three ===
2014

- A View From the Big Island
- Shipping out to Oahu
- Big Move to the Big Island
- A Home with a View on Hawaii's Big Island
- A Home with Character on the Big Island
- Island Hopping and House Hunting
- Newlyweds search for a home on Oahu where they can start a family
- Navy family moves to Oahu
- Empty Nesters search for a house in Oahu to start a new chapter of their lives
- A couple is moving to Oahu to continue their photography business
- An Outdoorsy Couple from Pennsylvania looks to enjoy the outdoors in Oahu all year long
- Young Couple trades in Madison, WI for killer views in Kauai
- A fire twirler and his family find a home on the big island

=== Season Four ===
2014 - 2015

- Young Family Looks to Make Roots in Waikiki
- A Hawaii Local Resumes His Search for the Ideal Property
- A Local Family Looks to Return to the Beach by Buying a Home Near Maui's North Shore
- Longtime Partners Leave Busy Honolulu Life Behind to Find Space on the Big Island
- Oklahoma Minister Moves His Wife and 5 Daughters to a Family-friendly Home on Oahu
- A Single Mom with an Empty Nest Seeks a New Life in Hilo
- Oahu Newlyweds Search for a Bigger Home Where They Can Start Their Family
- A Busy Business Traveler Searches for a Home Base on Maui
- A Military Family Searches for Their First Home on Oahu
- A Single Mother Searches for New Start On Oahu
- A Young Couple Seeks Their Own Paradise on the Island Where They Were Married
- Soon-to-be-Wed Couple Looks For a Place to Call Home in South Maui
- A Young Couple Looking to Expand Their Family Searches for a Home on the Big Island
- A Georgian Family Looks to Reconnect With Their Roots on the Big Island of Hawaii

=== Season Five ===
- A First-time Homebuyer Searches for a Condo on Oahu
- A young California Family Makes the Big Move to the Big Island of Hawaii
- A Single Sailor Searches for Her First Home on the Island of Oahu
- A Young North Dakota Surgeon and Her Husband Search for a Home Near Her New Job on Oahu
- A Family of Four Finds the Home of Their Dreams in Oahu's Countryside
- A Young Couple Explores Options on Kauai
- Finding a First Home Together on Oahu
- A Yogini and her Chef Partner Search for a Peaceful Retreat in the Puna District on the Big Island

=== Season Six ===
- Kauai Locals Buy First Home
- Young Couple Relocate to Maui
- Oregon Couple Seeks Hawaii Sun
- So Cal Family Moves to Kauai
- Newlyweds Home Search on Oahu
- Couple Starts Business in Kona
- Empty-Nesters Move to Kauai
- Military Family Moves to Oahu
- Back to the Big Island
- Texas Family Moves to Maui
- Single Mother Moves to Kauai
- Couple Moves to the Big Island
- From Heat of Arizona to Kauai
- Chicagoan and His Dogs Leave Behind Snow for Surf and Sun on Oahu
- Perfect Timing for Wisconsin Couple to Move to Oahu
- South Florida Couple Hunts for a New Home on the Big Island

=== Season Seven ===
- A Big Island Native Moves Back Home with His Wife and Three Children
- Setting Down Roots on Oahu
- Mother and Daughter Ditch Heat in Houston for New Life On Kauai
- Military Couple Entering Civilian Life Makes Oahu Home
- A Family Finally Takes the Plunge and Makes the Move to Hawaii That They Have Always Dreamed Of
- A Father Brings His Family to Lanikai, the Neighborhood He Called Home in His Youth
- Free Spirit Flees Wisconsin for Big Island of Hawaii
- San Antonio Family Searches for Oahu Home With Mountain Views
- A Lover of the Outdoors Starts Next Chapter of Life on the Big Island
- Soon-to-Be Parents Look for House on Oahu
- Montana Parents of Six Downsize for Cooler Lifestyle on Kauai
- California Couple Looks for Lots of Land on Kauai
- Police Dispatcher Searches for Her Sanctuary in West Maui
- Florida Divers Look for Oahu Home With Ocean Views

=== Season Eight ===
- From Canada To The Big Island
- A Young Couple Looks To Raise Kids In Paradise
- Finding A Farm On Maui
- Putting Down Roots In Oahu
- Getting Back In Shape On Oahu
- Outdoor Life On The Big Island
- From The Big Apple To Oahu
- Living The Dream On Maui
- Single And Ready For Oahu
- From Seattle To Amazing Maui
- Couple Moves To Big Island To Start Family
- Mom Follows Family To Oahu
