= Djimon Hounsou =

Beninese-born actor (born 1964)

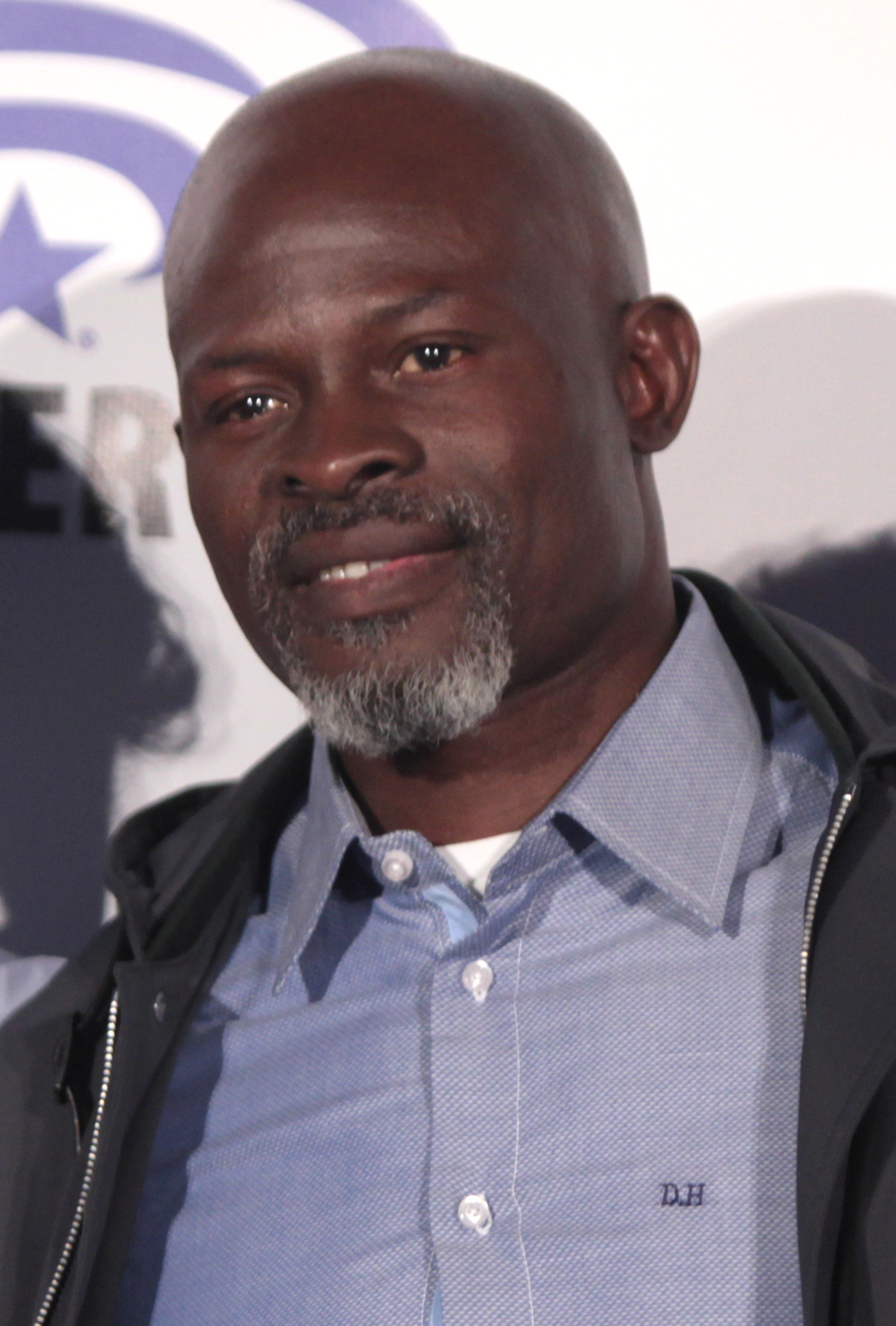
- Hounsou at the 2016 WonderCon
- Born: Djimon Gaston Hounsou; April 24, 1964 (age 62); Cotonou, Dahomey (now Benin)
- Citizenship: Benin; United States
- Occupations: Actor; model
- Years active: 1986–present
- Partner: Kimora Lee Simmons (2007–2012)
- Children: 1

Djimon Gaston Hounsou (/ˈdʒaɪmən ˈuːnsuː/ JY-mən OON-soo; French: [dʒimɔ̃ unsu]; born April 24, 1964) is a Beninese-American actor. He began his career appearing in music videos and made his film debut in Without You I'm Nothing (1990). He then earned widespread recognition for his role as Cinqué in the Steven Spielberg film Amistad (1997), which earned him a Golden Globe nomination. For his performances in In America (2002) and Blood Diamond (2006), Hounsou was nominated for the Academy Award for Best Supporting Actor.

In the Marvel Cinematic Universe, he portrays Korath the Pursuer in Guardians of the Galaxy (2014), Captain Marvel (2019) and What If...? (2021). In the DC Extended Universe, he appears as the Fisherman King in Aquaman (2018) and as the wizard Shazam in Shazam! (2019), Black Adam (2022) and Shazam! Fury of the Gods (2023). His other notable films include Stargate (1994), Gladiator (2000), Constantine, The Island (both 2005), Special Forces (2011), How to Train Your Dragon 2 (2014), Furious 7 (2015), The Legend of Tarzan (2016), A Quiet Place Part II (2021), Gran Turismo, Rebel Moon – Part One: A Child of Fire (both 2023), Rebel Moon – Part Two: The Scargiver and A Quiet Place: Day One (both 2024).

Hounsou made his directorial debut with the documentary film In Search of Voodoo: Roots to Heaven (2018).

== Early life ==
Hounsou was born in Cotonou, Benin, to Albertine and Pierre Hounsou. He immigrated to Lyon in France at the age of 12 with his brother Edmond. Soon after arriving there, he dropped out of school and was homeless for a time. A chance meeting with a photographer led to an introduction to fashion designer Thierry Mugler, who encouraged Hounsou to pursue a modelling career. In 1987, he became a model and established a career in Paris. He was found at Porte de Clichy. He moved to the United States in 1990.

== Career ==
=== Acting ===
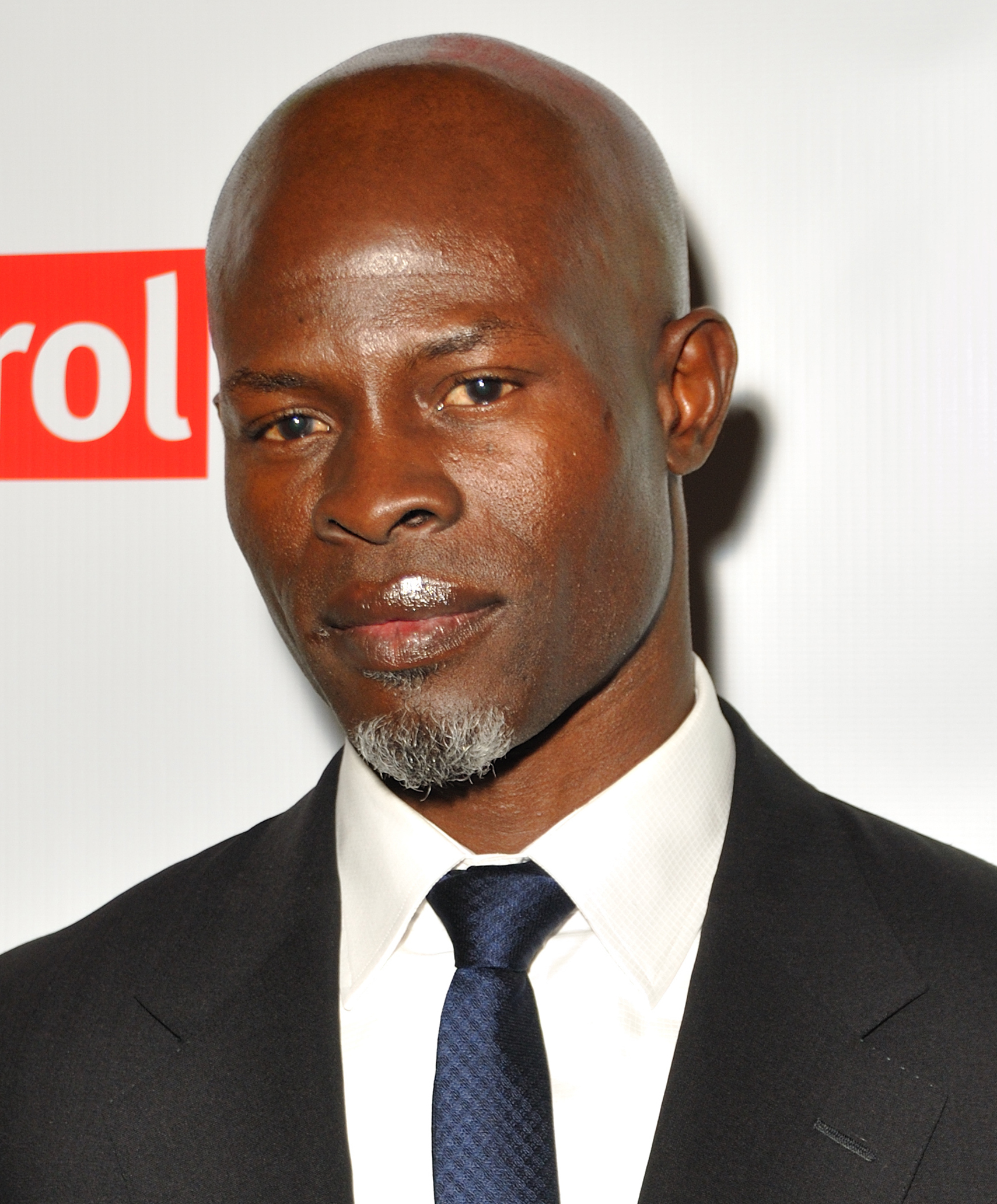
Hounsou at Final DipCon Opening Reception in 2013

Between 1989 and 1991, Hounsou appeared in the music videos for "Straight Up" by Paula Abdul, "I Don't Wanna Lose You" by Tina Turner, "Love Will Never Do (Without You)" by Janet Jackson and Madonna's "Express Yourself". He also appears in En Vogue's music video for "Hold On".

Hounsou's film debut was in the 1990 Sandra Bernhard film Without You I'm Nothing. He had television parts on Beverly Hills, 90210 and ER and a guest starring role on Alias. He had a larger role in the science fiction film Stargate.

Hounsou received wide critical acclaim and a Golden Globe Award nomination for his role as Cinqué in the 1997 Steven Spielberg film Amistad and gained further notice as Juba in the 2000 film Gladiator. In 2004, he was nominated for the Academy Award for Best Supporting Actor for In America, making him the fourth African male to be nominated for an Oscar. In 2005, he played a mercenary in the movie The Island alongside Ewan McGregor and Scarlett Johansson. In 2006, he won the National Board of Review Award for Best Supporting Actor for his performance in Blood Diamond and received Broadcast Film Critics Association, Screen Actors Guild Award and Academy Award nominations for this performance.

Hounsou had a supporting role in the 2009 science-fiction film Push, as Agent Henry Carver. In 2011, he starred as a French commando in the French film Forces spéciales.

Director Tim Story told IGN that if he had done a third Fantastic Four film, he would have liked Hounsou to portray Black Panther. In November 2008, it was announced that Hounsou would provide the voice of Black Panther in the television series of the same name. He had signed on to play Abdiel in the film version of John Milton's Paradise Lost with Benjamin Walker and Bradley Cooper, but the film was scrapped in early February 2012.

In 2013, he appeared in the comedy film Baggage Claim alongside Paula Patton. He also voiced Drago Blodfist in How to Train Your Dragon 2 and portrayed Korath the Pursuer in the Marvel Studios film Guardians of the Galaxy, both in 2014. He played villains in two 2015 films: Seventh Son and Furious 7, the latter being the seventh installment of The Fast and the Furious franchise.

In February 2016, it was reported that Hounsou would join the second season of the television series Wayward Pines. Also in 2016, he played Chief Mbonga in The Legend of Tarzan.

In 2018, Hounsou joined the DC Extended Universe, voicing the Fisherman King Ricou in Aquaman (with the character motion-captured by Andrew Crawford). He then replaced Ron Cephas Jones as the Wizard Shazam in Shazam! (2019). He reprised his role in Black Adam (2022) and Shazam! Fury of the Gods (2023). Also in 2019, he reprised his role as Korath in the Marvel Studios film Captain Marvel and then in the animated series What If...?.

In November 2022, it was announced that Honsou had joined the cast of the film based on the Gran Turismo video game, with Geri Halliwell playing his wife.

In January 2025, Hounsou claimed that, throughout his career, he has encountered challenges like those experienced by other Black actors in Hollywood, including being typecast, and claimed he's been always getting "unfair compensation." He blamed systemic racism for this predicament, saying that, despite having been twice nominated for an Academy Award, he is still "struggling financially to make a living."

=== Modeling ===
On 24 February 2007, it was announced that Hounsou would be the new Calvin Klein underwear model. At the time, he was represented by Los Angeles modeling agent Omar Albertto.

=== Other work ===
In 2010, Hounsou was featured as the narrator in ESPN's series of "32 Teams, 1 Dream" commercials for the 2010 FIFA World Cup. He spoke at the Summit on Climate Change at the United Nations on September 22, 2009. On December 1, 2009, he told French media that developed countries "need to be held accountable" for their contribution to climate change.

In 2018, Hounsou made his directorial debut with the documentary film In Search of Voodoo: Roots to Heaven, which examines the history, nature and religious practices of West African Vodun. The documentary premiered at the Miami International Film Festival on March 10, 2018.

In 2024, Hounsou had a guest performance on South African record producer and DJ Black Coffee's "Ode to Ancestors" song which was included in an EP inspired by Zack Snyder's movie, Rebel Moon – Part Two: The Scargiver.

== Personal life ==
In 2007, Hounsou began dating model Kimora Lee Simmons. Hounsou and Simmons visited Hounsou's family in his native Benin in the summer of 2008, where the two participated in a traditional commitment ceremony. They were adorned in traditional clothing and used the ceremony, in the presence of Hounsou's family, to confirm that they were "dedicated to each other 100%", although they emphasized the ceremony was not a wedding. In the début of Kimora Lee Simmons's show Kimora: Life in the Fab Lane, he was billed as her husband. In 2009, Simmons gave birth to their son. Hounsou and Simmons, who were never legally married in the United States, announced their separation in November 2012.

== Filmography ==
=== Film ===
Year	Title	Role	Notes
1990	Without You I'm Nothing	Ex-Boyfriend	
1992	Unlawful Entry	Prisoner on Bench	
1993	Killing Zoe	Moïse (voice)	
1994	Stargate	Horus	Credited as "Djimon"
1997	Ill Gotten Gains	Fyah	
1997	Amistad	Joseph Cinqué	
1998	Deep Rising	Vivo	
2000	Gladiator	Juba	
2002	Le Boulet	Detective Youssouf	
2002	The Four Feathers	Abou Fatma	
2003	In America	Mateo	
2003	Biker Boyz	'Motherland'	
2003	Lara Croft: Tomb Raider – The Cradle of Life	Kosa	
2004	Blueberry	Woodhead	
2005	Constantine	Papa Midnite	
2005	Beauty Shop	Joe	
2005	The Island	Albert Laurent	
2006	Blood Diamond	Solomon Vandy	
2006	Eragon	Ajihad	
2007	A Place in Time	Himself	Documentary film
2008	Never Back Down	Jean Roqua	
2009	Push	Henry Carver	
2010	The Tempest	Caliban	
2011	Elephant White	Curtis 'Curtie' Church	
2011	Special Forces	Kovax	
2013	Baggage Claim	Quinton Jamison	
2014	How to Train Your Dragon 2	Drago Bludvist (voice)	
2014	Guardians of the Galaxy	Korath the Pursuer	
2014	Seventh Son	Radu	
2015	Furious 7	Mose Jakande	
2015	The Vatican Tapes	Vicar Imani	
2015	Air	Cartwright	
2016	The Legend of Tarzan	Chief Mbonga	
2017	King Arthur: Legend of the Sword	Bedivere	
2017	Same Kind of Different as Me	Denver	
2017	I Am Heath Ledger	Himself	Documentary film
2018	Aquaman	King Ricou (voice)	
2018	In Search of Voodoo: Roots to Heaven	Narrator	Also director, writer and producer; Documentary film
2019	Serenity	Duke	
2019	Captain Marvel	Korath	
2019	Shazam!	The Wizard	
2019	Charlie's Angels	Edgar 'Bosley' Dessange	
2020	A Quiet Place Part II	Man on Island	
2021	The King's Man	Shola	
2022	Paws of Fury: The Legend of Hank	Sumo (voice)	
2022	Black Adam	The Wizard	Cameo
2023	Shazam! Fury of the Gods	The Wizard	
2023	Ozi: Voice of the Forest	Ozi's Father (voice)	
2023	Gran Turismo	Steve Mardenborough	
2023	Rebel Moon – Part One: A Child of Fire	General Titus	
2024	Rebel Moon – Part Two: The Scargiver	General Titus	
2024	A Quiet Place: Day One	Henri ("Man on Island")	
2026	Twisted	Dr. Kezian	
2026	Thrash	Dr. Dale Edwards	
2026	The Passenger	Hassan	
TBA	Highlander	Sunda Kastagir	Filming
TBA	Red Card	Max Elmi	Filming

=== Television ===
Year	Title	Role	Notes	Ref
1990	Beverly Hills, 90210	Doorman	Episode: "Class of Beverly Hills"	
1999	ER	Mobalage Ikabo	6 episodes	
2000	The Wild Thornberrys	Villager (voice)	Episode: "Luck Be an Aye-Aye"	
2001	Soul Food	Victor Onuka	Episode: "Games People Play"	
2003-2004	Alias	Kazari Bomani	3 episodes	
2010	Black Panther	T'Challa / Black Panther (voice)	6 episodes	
2016	Wayward Pines	CJ Mitchum	8 episodes	
2018	DreamWorks Dragons	Drago Bludvist (voice)	Episode: "King of Dragons, Part 2"	
2019	The Longest Day in Chang'an	Master Ge	Episode: "Time Of Great Waste"	
2021	Invincible	Martian Emperor	Episode: "Neil Armstrong, Eat Your Heart Out"	
2021	What If...?	Korath (voice)	Episode: "What If... T'Challa Became a Star-Lord?"	

=== Video games ===
Year	Title	Role	Notes
2020	NBA 2K21	Coach Henry Bishop	Also motion capture

=== Music video ===
Year	Title	Artist	Notes
1992	"Too Funky"	George Michael	Original director's cut

== Awards and nominations ==
Year	Award	Category	Work	Result
2004	Academy Awards	Best Supporting Actor	In America	Nominated
2007	Academy Awards	Best Supporting Actor	Blood Diamond	Nominated
2004	Black Reel Awards	Best Supporting Actor	In America	Won
2007	Black Reel Awards	Best Supporting Actor	Blood Diamond	Won
2007	Broadcast Film Critics	Best Supporting Actor	Blood Diamond	Nominated
1998	Golden Globe Awards	Best Actor – Drama	Amistad	Nominated
2004	Independent Spirit Awards	Best Supporting Male	In America	Won
1998	NAACP Image Awards	Outstanding Actor in a Motion Picture	Amistad	Won
2004	NAACP Image Awards	Outstanding Supporting Actor	In America	Nominated
2007	NAACP Image Awards	Outstanding Supporting Actor	Blood Diamond	Won
2006	National Board of Review	Best Supporting Actor	Blood Diamond	Won
2001	Screen Actors Guild	Outstanding Cast in a Motion Picture	Gladiator	Nominated
2004	Screen Actors Guild	Outstanding Cast in a Motion Picture	In America	Nominated
2007	Screen Actors Guild	Outstanding Performance by an Actor in a Supporting Role	Blood Diamond	Nominated

== See also ==
- List of male underwear models
