= Dan Rodricks =

American newspaper columnist and radio personality

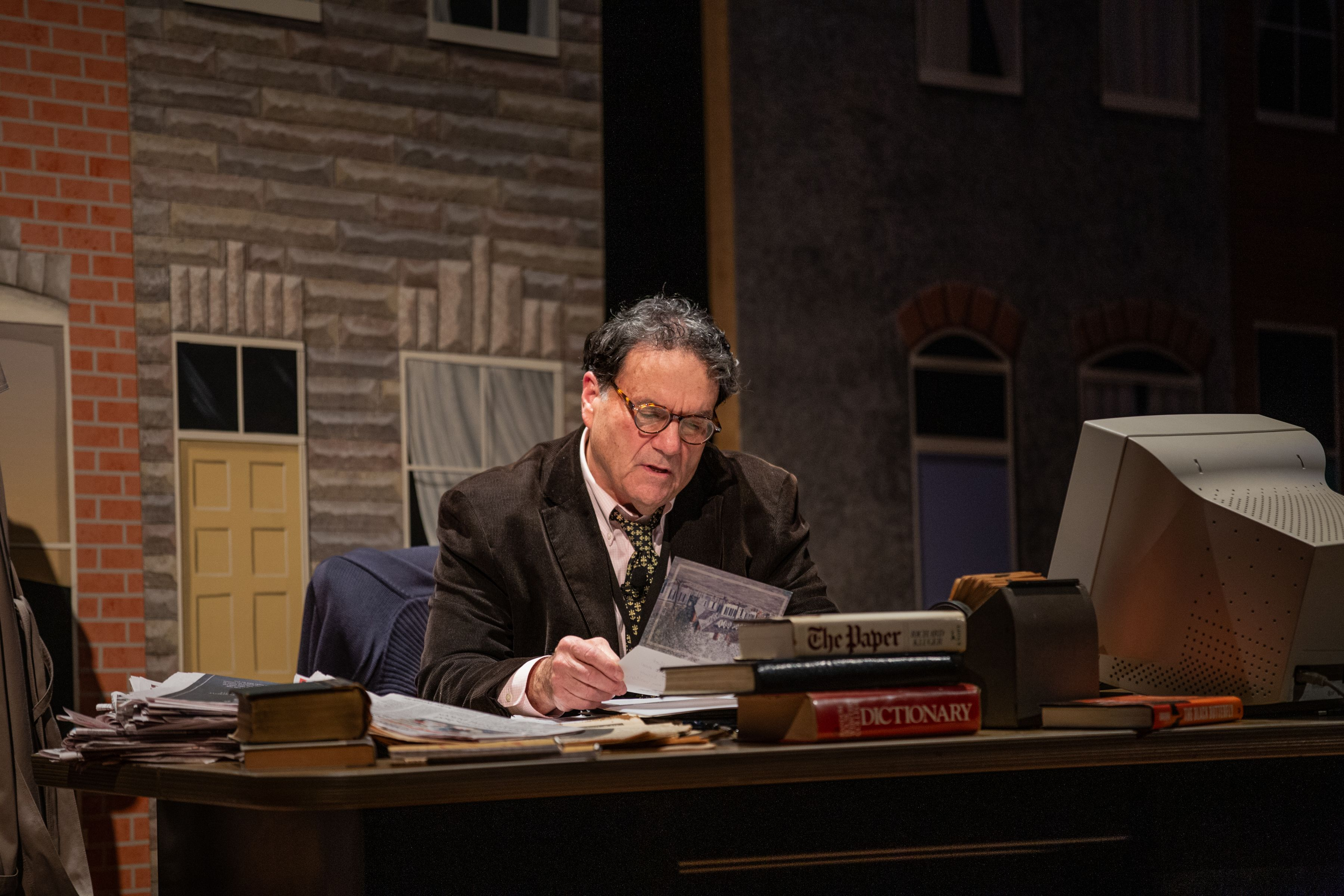
Dan Rodricks on the set of one of his Baltimore plays, 2024

Dan Rodricks is a former longtime columnist for The Baltimore Sun newspapers, and former host of the Roughly Speaking podcast for baltimoresun.com. He was previously the host of Midday, a two-hour, daily talk show on WYPR FM 88.1, the NPR station in Baltimore, and the host of "Rodricks For Breakfast" on WMAR-TV, (Channel 2). He is also an author and playwright.

A native of East Bridgewater, Mass., a 1972 graduate of that South Shore town's high school and of the University of Bridgeport in Connecticut, Rodricks' newspaper career started with The Patiot Ledger in Quincy, Mass.

After arriving in Baltimore from New England in 1976, Rodricks started writing a column on a wide range of topics for the former afternoon paper, The Evening Sun, in 1979. The column appeared three times per week. The column moved to the newly consolidated morning and evening editions of The Sun in 1990. It was one of the longest-running newspaper columns in the U.S. until Rodricks resigned from The Sun in January 2025.

Rodricks' "Dear Drug Dealers" series in The Sun, a public call for an end to criminal violence in Baltimore, won the 2006 "Excellence in Urban Journalism Award" from the Freedom Forum and the Enterprise Foundation (established by Gannett Newspapers) and the 2005 "Public Service Award" from the Chesapeake Associated Press. Thousands of ex-felons and incarcerated prisoners over the years contacted Rodricks seeking help in post-prison employment.

Rodricks won national awards, including the "National Headliners Award" for commentary and the "Heywood Broun Award" from the Newspaper Guild for columns that championed the underdog. His columns won numerous awards from the Maryland-Delaware-D.C. Press Association.

From 1980 to 1993, Rodricks produced a weekly commentary or feature for WBAL-TV's 5 pm newscast. From 1989 until 1993, he hosted a nightly talk show on WBAL-AM (1090), as well as a five-hour Saturday morning radio show that ran until 1995. His radio documentary, "Along The River," won the Silver Medal in an international broadcast competition in 1993. Rodricks hosted a live, local-interest weekend television show, "Rodricks For Breakfast," on WMAR-TV from January 1995 until October 1999.

His daily, two-hour Midday radio show ran on WYPR-FM from 2008 until 2015, when Rodricks created the Roughly Speaking podcast for The Baltimore Sun. The podcast was retired after 450 episodes in 2019.

Rodricks was awarded a doctorate in journalism from McDaniel College in 2023

A collection of Rodricks' columns, "Mencken Doesn't Live Here Anymore," was published in 1989. His second book, "Father's Day Creek: Fly Fishing, Fatherhood and The Last Best Place on Earth," was published by Apprentice House in 2019.

Rodricks resigned from The Baltimore Sun in January 2025. In an interview with WYPR radio host Tom Hall, Rodricks said that he wasn't ready to retire from The Sun, but was driven to leave the paper because of changes made under its new owners, David D. Smith and conservative columnist Armstrong Williams. Later that month, it was announced that Rodricks would become a writer for the Baltimore Brew and a columnist for the Baltimore Fishbowl. He also established himself as a timely and insightful national columnist on Substack.

Dan Rodricks has written, produced and appeared in three plays about his adopted hometown: "Baltimore, You Have No Idea," "Baltimore Docket" and "No Mean City: Baltimore 1966." Baltimore magazine named him the city's best playwright in 2024. He also created and performed a one-man show about growing up in Massachusetts, entitled, "Wicked Good: A South Shore Anthology."
