= Baby Phat =

American clothing brand

- Industry: Fashion
- Founded: 1999
- Founder: Russell Simmons
- Headquarters: New York City, New York, U.S.
- Owner: Kimora Lee Simmons (2019)
- Website: www.babyphat.com

Baby Phat by Kimora Lee Simmons is a privately held American apparel brand originally established in 1999 by entrepreneur, Russell Simmons. Initially launched as a womenswear offshoot of the menswear label, Phat Farm, Baby Phat by Kimora Lee Simmons eventually grew into a comprehensive lifestyle brand that is widely regarded as one of the most definitive brands of the early aughts era. Baby Phat by Kimora Lee Simmons was re-launched in December 2019.

== History ==
Following her marriage to Russell Simmons In 1998, Kimora Lee Simmons was presented with a prototype of a women's T-shirt from Phat Farm. Simmons was disappointed with the sample, later describing it as a "very athletic and basic, scaled-down version of what a guy would wear." Drawing on her experience as a fashion model, Simmons decided to step into the role of designer and creative director to create a collection that she thought better represented what women would actually want to wear, and in 1999 Baby Phat By Kimora Lee Simmons launched. Baby Phat by Kimora Lee Simmons began with low-rise jeans and tops adorned with a rhinestone curved cat logo inspired by her pet Siamese cat, Max. Simmons later said she created the collection because "women — especially women of color — had no voice in the streetwear industry. It's in our DNA; this brand is created for women, by women."

Baby Phat by Kimora Lee Simmons's first solo show took place during New York Fashion Week in 2000. The show was streamed live from its venue at Radio City Music Hall to the Jumbrotron in Times Square. Like Phat Farm before it, Baby Phat candidly celebrated black culture, resulting in its pigeonhole as an "urban" brand by fashion's elite. Baby Phat circumvented the fashion industry's traditional paths to commercial viability by enlisting the help of well-known hip-hop artists to market directly to its consumer base. Through this marketing strategy and by way of its symbiosis with hip-hop culture, Baby Phat rose meteorically in the pop culture consciousness.

In 2000, Kimora Lee Simmons assumed the role of President and Creative Director of Baby Phat by Kimora Lee Simmons. Under her direction, Baby Phat by Kimora Lee Simmons expanded into a comprehensive lifestyle brand that encompassed denim, accessories, jewelry, footwear, swimwear, lingerie and fragrance.

By 2001, two years after its launch, Baby Phat by Kimora Lee Simmons reported gross revenue of $30 million - a mark that took Phat Farm six years to reach. By 2002, revenue had increased from $30 million annually to $265 million, resulting in a billion-dollar valuation of the company. Revenue for the following year increased by an additional 30 percent. By 2003, Baby Phat by Kimora Lee Simmons was the most profitable of Phat Fashions's four labels.

In 2004, American apparel manufacturer, The Kellwood Company announced its plans to acquire Baby Phat along with parent company, Phat Fashions. Kellwood retained Simmons as president and Creative Director of Baby Phat by Kimora Lee Simmons following their acquisition of the brand.

Baby Phat by Kimora Lee Simmons had several notable brand partnerships during this period. These included a partnership with Visa to produce a Baby Phat by Kimora Lee Simmons branded prepaid Rush Visa card. In 2004, Baby Phat partnered with Motorola to create the Baby Phat by Kimora Lee Simmons i833 mobile phone, which sold exclusively at Bloomingdale's. That same year, Baby Phat partnered with Vida Shoes International to create a line of footwear, which included stilettos, wedges, boots, and toddler shoes.

In 2004, Baby Phat by Kimora Lee Simmons partnered with Coty Inc to launch Baby Phat Goddess. The fragrance was carried at department stores nationwide, including Macy's. Baby Phat Goddess was later joined by five other fragrances: Goddess, Golden Goddess, Seductive Goddess, Fabulosity, Luv Me, and Dare Me.

In 2006, Simmons was promoted to president of Baby Phat's parent company, Phat Fashions. Later that year, Baby Phat by Kimora Lee Simmons created a 200-piece lingerie collection that was carried at upmarket department stores.

Simmons's contract with The Kellwood Company ended in 2010. At the same time, Kellwood sold Phat Fashions to Sun Capital Partners, and Simmons declined to renew her position with the company's new owners. Upon her exit from Phat Fashions, however, Simmons retained ownership of all licensing rights to her fragrance and cosmetics collection.

On International Women's Day, 2019, Kimora Lee Simmons announced the reacquisition of Baby Phat. The brand relaunched the following summer through a collaboration with Forever 21. The collection featured eighteen clothing items branded with Baby Phat's signature cat logo and is reported to have sold out in 24 hours.

On December 6, 2019, Baby Phat relaunched on its own and published a spring/summer 2020 campaign on its website. Simmons's daughters, Aoki and Ming Lee were instrumental in the relaunch. The 2020 relaunch also included a line of beauty products under the name Baby Phat Beauty. In 2022, a new capsule collection debuted exclusively at Macy's. The collection was available online and at fifty retail locations nationwide. Also in 2022, Baby Phat partnered with Puma to produce a line of Baby Phat-branded athletic footwear.

== Impact ==
On the impact of Baby Phat by Kimora Lee Simmons, CR Fashion Book's Giovanni Osterman writes: "Few brands are as culturally and aesthetically synonymous as Baby Phat is to the early 2000s." New York Daily News ranked Baby Phat by Kimora Lee Simmons as the number one most sought after ticket at New York Fashion Week during the mid-aughts. Celebrity fans of the brand included Alicia Keys, Chrissy Teigan, Kim Kardashian, Christina Millian, Britney Spears, Paris Hilton, Missy Elliott, and Rihanna, who so loved the brand that she purchased the entire archive from a collector in 2019. Supermodels to have walked the Baby Phat runway include: Alek Wek, Eva Herzigová, Carmen Kass, and Devon Aoki. Hip-hop stars like Lil' Kim were also cast to walk the Baby Phat runway during fashion week.

Explaining the ethos behind her casting choices, Kimora Lee Simmons said: "It's very deliberate. It includes people who are sometimes forgotten but are great models - they have fierce walks and bodies, strong girls, but they might sometimes be a size bigger than the other one who was a size zero. They have more 'hip,' more color, and more bang to their personality. It's what I represent culturally in society: all colors, all women, all shapes and sizes." Simmons was similarly deliberate about her choice to walk the finale of each show with her daughters, Ming Lee and Aoki Lee, by her side. She stated that it was important for her to send a message that a woman could be both a mother and a mogul.

Baby Phat by Kimora Lee Simmons offered an experience to female minorities who previously did not have access to the world of fashion. The brand was built on bringing a high-level designer aesthetic to the street. Though streetwear had already emerged from a combination of global subcultures prior to Baby Phat by Kimora Lee Simmons, Baby Phat by Kimora Lee Simmons was the first streetwear brand to identify a female customer and cater to her with feminine styles of clothing that spoke directly to their culture. Many of these styles had never been seen before in the fashion market place. These styles included miniaturized baby-doll T-shirts, cropped and faux-fur lined puffer jackets and pastel velour tracksuits all emblazoned with the signature rhinestoned cat logo.
