= Tim Leissner =

German-born investment banker (born 1969)

- Born: Timothy Leissner; November 2, 1969 (age 56); Germany
- Occupation: Investment banker
- Known for: 1MDB Fraud
- Title: Chairman of Southeast Asia and Managing Director of Goldman Sachs
- Spouses: Judy Chan (m. 2000, divorced) Kimora Lee Simmons (m. 2014; sep. 2022)
- Children: 2

Timothy Leissner (born November 2, 1969) is a German-born investment banker and convicted felon. As managing director at Goldman Sachs and chairman of the bank's Southeast Asia division Leissner helped orchestrate the 1Malaysia Development Berhad scandal, one of the biggest financial scandals in history, in which billions of dollars were stolen. He was arrested in June 2018 in Washington, D.C. and eventually forced to pay a $43 million fine. Leissner was facing up to 25 years in prison, however he cooperated with authorities and in May 2025, he was sentenced to two years in Federal prison.

== Early life and education ==
Tim Leissner was born in Germany as the son of a senior executive at Volkswagen. He completed his early education in Germany, where he was recognized for strong academic performance. In 1991, he obtained a Bachelor of Arts degree in Business Administration from the University of Siegen, a public research university in North Rhine‑Westphalia. The following year in 1992, he earned an MBA from the University of Hartford in Connecticut.

== Career ==
After working at JPMorgan and Lehman Brothers, Leissner joined Goldman Sachs in 1998, where he worked as an investment banker until 2016. He was promoted to Managing Director in 2002 and became a Partner in 2006. In 2013, he was appointed to Goldman Sachs' Partnership Committee, placing him among the firm's senior leadership. The following year, in 2014, he was named Chairman of the bank's Southeast Asia division.

He retired in January 2016 after an internal review found he sent a fake letter to Banque Havilland on behalf of Jho Low.

In addition to his professional career, Leissner was a co-founder of the People's Wish Foundation, a charitable organization based in China.

Leissner has served as a director and shareholder of Celsius Holdings, Inc., and All Def Digital, which provided marketing and advisory services to Celsius.

=== 1MDB ===
Leissner was arrested in June 2018 in Washington, D.C. In 2018 he pled guilty to charges he personally stole $200 million from a Malaysian sovereign wealth fund 1 Malaysia Development Berhad (1MDB) and that he broke the Foreign Corrupt Practices Act (FCPA) by paying bribes to corrupt Malaysian and Emirati offices to get Goldman Sachs business.

Leissner was banned for life by the Securities and Exchange Commission and forced to pay a $43 million fine. As of 2020 he faced up to 25 years in prison. but due to his cooperation has avoided spending any time in jail.

He testified against his former deputy Roger Ng in a 2022 trial. As of 2022, Leissner was free on bail of $20 million. On 29 May 2025 Leissner was sentenced to two years in Federal prison by Chief District Judge Margo Brodie in the Eastern District of New York.

== Personal life ==
Leissner has been married 3 times. He was twice married to two women at the same time.

He married his second wife, Judy Chan, in Hong Kong in about 2000.

In 2014, Leissner married Kimora Lee Simmons. At the time Leissner married Simmons, he was still married to his ex-wife, Judy Chan. Leissner gave Simmons photoshopped documents showing that he was divorced from Chan, and created an email address in Chan's name to convince Simmons that the couple had divorced. He continued the correspondence for over a year and continued using the email account for several years. Leissner and Simmons had a son, born in 2015. In 2020, Simmons adopted a 10-year old son. In February 2022, it was revealed that Leissner and Simmons were estranged, though it is not clear when the couple split.

Leissner has a daughter.
