= Scoring the Deal =

- Genre: Real estate
- Country of origin: United States
- No. of seasons: 2
- No. of episodes: 14

Production
- Running time: 22 minutes

Original release
- Network: HGTV, HGTV Canada
- Release: January 8, 2013

Scoring the Deal is an American reality series that airs on HGTV and HGTV Canada. The show follows Jason Abrams and Kristen Cook of the Abrams Team through Pro-Athlete real estate. It aired from January 8, 2013, with two seasons.

== Synopsis ==
For over a decade, Jason Abrams has been known as the "Jerry Maguire of real estate," responsible for buying and selling homes worth millions of dollars for pro-athletes. Jason's life provides a behind-the-scenes look into the intense world of pro-sports real estate. A dedicated, 24/7 working machine, Jason is equal parts real estate agent, concierge and tour guide as well as a marriage and credit counselor. "Scoring the Deal," has a similar premise to other real estate-themed reality television shows such as – "Selling New York," "Million Dollar Listing" and "House Hunters." During the season, Jason Abrams and his partner Kristen Cook handle real estate deals for pros such as former NFL running back Clinton Portis, Indianapolis Colts star Vontae Davis and San Francisco 49ers tight end Vernon Davis.

== Cast ==
=== Jason Abrams ===
The Abrams Team is a national real estate group in the United States affiliated with Keller Williams Realty, founded by CEO Jason Abrams. The company's clientele includes NFL, NBA, and MLB players. Jason works in the residential real estate business as a third-generation real estate professional, with offices located in Phoenix, Detroit, and McLean, Virginia. Jason is also a former Chairman of the Agent Leadership Council and a former Keller Williams office manager. He has taken on the roles of teacher, guest lecturer, and non-profit executive board member. Jason has a show premiering in 2012 on HGTV called Scoring the Deal.

=== Kristen Cook ===
Kristen obtained a degree in communications with a minor in Public Relations, and then began her career in the Staffing Industry. She transitioned from working as the National Staffing Director to a Luxury Real Estate Consultant. Licensed in New Jersey. Kristen's partnership with Jason Abrams has led to her role as co-star in Scoring the Deal.

== Series overview ==
=== Season 1 ===
Episode 1: A one of a kind Miami condo with killer views for NFL star Clinton Portis

Episode 2: NBA star Jordan Farmar looks in New Jersey while the NFL's Davis Brothers, Vernon and Vontae, sell in Miami

Episode 3: A family friendly luxury Manhattan condo for NFL Champ Cato June

Episode 4: NFL pro Joe Haden lists the family Maryland estate and NBA star Greivis Vasquez moves to New Orleans

Episode 5: A uniquely royal Miami home for NFL Pro Adewale Ogunleye

Episode 6: NFL pro Derrick Morgan looks for a more private Nashville home

=== Season 2 ===
HGTV announced on February 25, 2013, that they had picked up a second season of Scoring the Deal due to the first season having around 9 million viewers. Season 2 began filming in May 2013.

Episode 1: A New England home for NFL pro Kyle Arrington

Episode 2: A condo that's close to the stadium for NFL rookie EJ Manuel

Episode 3: A multi-family home in San Francisco for NFL pro Keith Bulluck, his wife and kids

Episode 4: A home for L.A. Dodger Jerry Hairston Jr. and WNBA star Brittany Jackson sells her godparents' home in Tennessee

Episode 5: A home in Arizona for Diamondbacks Pitcher Brandon McCarthy

Episode 6: A luxury rental home in Toronto for NBA pro Rudy Gay and David Wells lists his San Diego mansion

Episode 7: A condo in Indianapolis for NBA pro C. J. Watson, NHL star Kyle Quincey lists his Denver home

Episode 8: A luxury townhouse for NHL pro Gabriel Landeskog, MLB pro Bret Boone lists his San Diego estate
