= Wicked Single =

American reality television series

- Genre: Reality
- Country of origin: United States
- No. of seasons: 1
- No. of episodes: 8

Production
- Executive producers: Banks Tarver; Jeff Olde; Kari McFarland; Ken Druckerman; Lisa Marie Tobin; Nina L. Diaz; Rick Hankey; Sean Gottlieb; Shelly Tatro; Warren Cohen
- Running time: 40 to 43 minutes
- Production company: Left/Right Productions

Original release
- Network: VH1
- Release: March 17 – May 5, 2013

Wicked Single is an American reality television series on VH1 and debut on March 17, 2013. Wicked Single encompasses a group of six friends located in Boston. James Shea known as Chubs, Nicole Belli known as Nikki Belli and Rachel Hinman are the main characters of Wicked Single. It follows them as they endure everything from the stress of life to a night on the town.

== Cast ==
- Chelsi (age 24): Chelsi is the jealous one of the group. Chelsi always seems to get everyone around her into some type of trouble.
- Chrissy (age 27): Chrissy works three jobs: a hairdresser, a promotional model and at a prison.
- Chubs (age 30): Chubs is known around town as the party starter. He sent in a casting tape for another series on VH1 but subsequently was rejected. Despite this, producers enjoyed his personality which led to him and his friends receiving their own series. In 2009, Chubs participated as a contestant on A Double Shot at Love but was later eliminated for his conservative beliefs, specifically surrounding gay marriage.
- Joe (age 30): Joe is roommates with Chubs, and his best friend.
- Nicole Belli, Nikki Belli, Nicole Nikki Belli: Nikki is Rachel's friend. She was born and raised in Boston. Nikki and her cousin pitched their own reality show prior to Wicked Single. Producers enjoyed Nikki's personality which led to being cast in Wicked Single. Nikki is the Snooki figure on VH1’s new “Jersey Shore”-like reality show. She is the breakout character. Nikki is one of the bubbly, upbeat, easy-going girls starring on the VH-1 reality TV show. She’s always full of candid, rather surprising moments.
- Rachel (age 28): Rachel is envious of her two sisters getting married, and is ready to find her future husband.

== Episodes ==
No.	Title	Original release date
1	"Wicked Single"	March 17, 2013
2	"Dirty Thirty"	March 24, 2013
Chubs invites almost 100 of this close friends to celebrate his 30th birthday.
3	"Pahty Hahdah"	March 31, 2013
Chub discovers a girl who seems to like him. Rachel devises a plan to get Nikki to attend a double date with her.
4	"Rachel Gone Wild"	April 7, 2013
Chelsi is surprised when Rachel calls and asks for an apology. Chubs invites everyone to his house for a fun-filled after party.
5	"Sad Girls Club"	April 28, 2013
Rachel's relationship with RJ becomes serious. Nikki puts Joe on the spot for leading Rachel on. Chubs and Joe's neighbors are tired of their partying.
6	"Slappy Days"	April 28, 2013
7	"Down Goes Nikki"	May 5, 2013
8	"Wicked Finale"	May 5, 2013
