= Kimora Lee Simmons =

American model and fashion designer (born 1975)

Kimora Lee
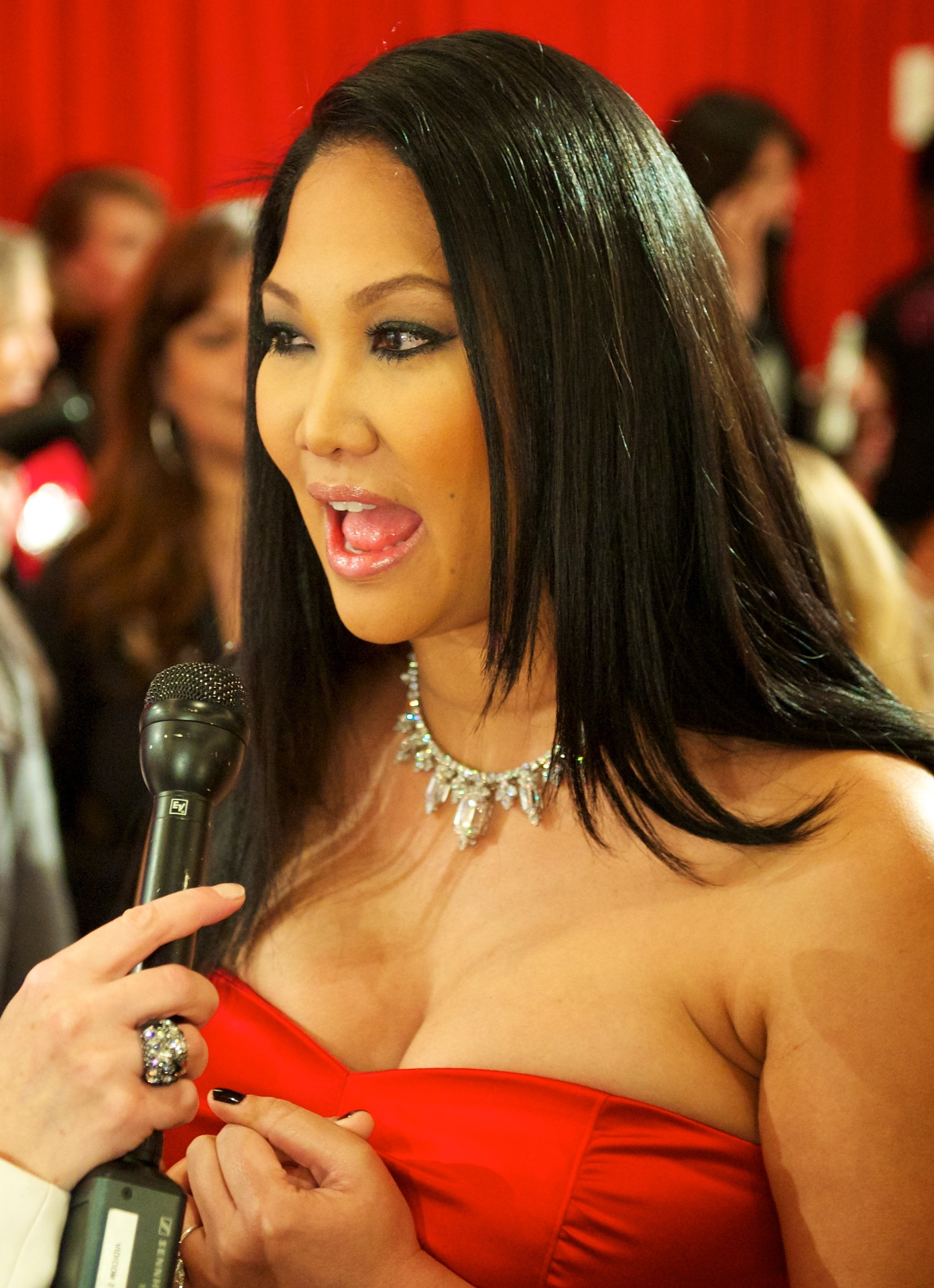
- Lee in 2009
- Born: Kimora Lee Perkins; May 4, 1975 (age 51); St. Louis, Missouri, U.S.
- Other names: Kimora Lee Simmons, Kimora Lee Leissner
- Education: University of Hartford (BA)
- Occupations: Model; fashion designer; TV personality
- Years active: 1988–present
- Spouses: Russell Simmons (m. 1998; div. 2009) Tim Leissner (m. 2014; sep. 2022)
- Partner: Djimon Hounsou (2007–2012)
- Children: 5
- Modeling information
- Height: 6 ft 0 in (183 cm)
- Hair color: Black
- Eye color: Brown
- Website: babyphat.com

Kimora Lee (née Perkins, formerly Simmons; born May 4, 1975) is an American fashion designer, television personality and former fashion model. Discovered as a teenager, she was signed to Chanel and went on to walk the runway for major fashion houses such as Fendi and Valentino and appeared on the covers of Vogue and Elle. She launched the global lifestyle brand Baby Phat in 1999. She ventured into reality television alongside her family, starring in the Style Network reality series Kimora: Life in the Fab Lane (2007–11), Kimora: House of Fab (2013), and currently in Kimora: Back in the Fab Lane (2025–present).

== Early life ==
Kimora Lee Perkins was born in St. Louis to an African-American father and a Japanese-Korean mother. Growing up in the northern St. Louis suburb of Florissant, Missouri, Simmons was a frequent target of bullying at school. Because of her height – 5'10" (177.8 cm) by age ten – and multiethnic background, Simmons struggled to find confidence and felt, in her own words, "different." In an effort to bolster Kimora's confidence, Kimora's mother enrolled her in modeling classes when she was eleven years old. Two years later, Simmons attended a model search event in Kansas City, where she was discovered by the event's organizer, Marie-Christine Kollock, an agent from the prominent Paris modeling agency, Glamour. Kollock then sent Simmons to Paris, where she would soon find favor with fashion industry leaders and begin her modeling career in earnest.

Simmons is a graduate of Lutheran North High School in St. Louis, Missouri. In 2017, Simmons returned to school, and in 2018, she graduated with a Bachelor of Arts in Business and Entrepreneurial Affairs from the University of Hartford's Barney School of Business in Hartford, Connecticut.

== Career ==
=== Modeling ===
At the age of thirteen, Simmons secured an exclusive modeling contract with Chanel and began working under the tutelage of Chanel's then designer, the late Karl Lagerfeld. Lagerfeld and Simmons's mentor-muse relationship happened at a time in fashion history when a multiethnic look like Simmons's was uncommon in high-end fashion advertising. As Simmons remembers: "Karl chose to put a mixed-race model on a Parisian runway before anyone else. By his example, I learned how to stand tall and claim my destiny - to dream bigger than I ever thought possible and command my dreams into reality."

After closing the 1989 Chanel haute couture show as "The Bride," Simmons went on to walk the runways for such fashion houses as Fendi, Valentino, Emanuel Ungaro, and Yves Saint Laurent as well as appear on covers and in the pages of such fashion publications as Vogue, Harper's Bazaar, and Elle.

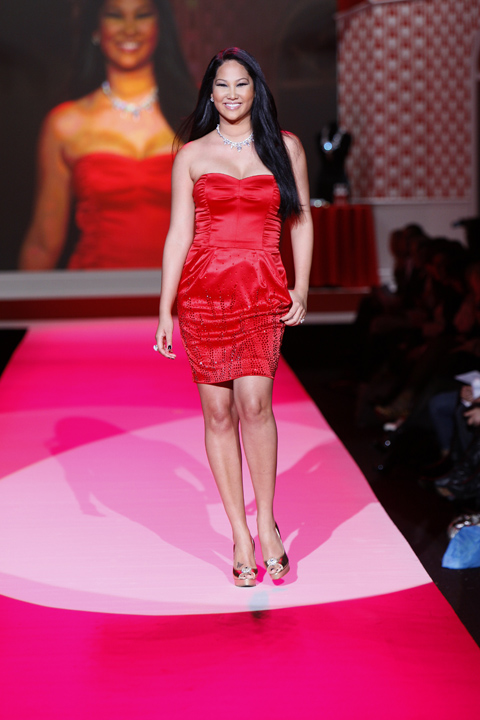
Simmons in 2009

=== Fashion design ===
In 1999, Simmons launched the global lifestyle brand, Baby Phat. The label was launched as a women's wear off-shoot of the men's streetwear line, Phat Farm and overarching fashion label Phat Fashions, which Russell Simmons, her then-husband, had founded in 1992. Like Phat Farm and other black-owned fashion labels that emerged around the same period, Baby Phat was created to offer consumers color collections that were authentic to the culture. Mirroring the trajectory of the hip-hop music and style that inspired it, however, Baby Phat eventually grew to cross all barriers of culture and race, reaching mass-marketability and entering the lexicon of both fashion and popular culture.

On September 15, 1999, Baby Phat debuted its first fashion show at New York Fashion Week. The show was held at Radio City Music Hall and streamed live to the Jumbotron in Times Square. With celebrities like Aaliyah, Lil' Kim (who also walked the Baby Phat runway in 2000), Missy Elliott, Mary J. Blige, and Paris Hilton in attendance, Baby Phat fashion shows were a frequent focal point during New York Fashion Week. Simmons concluded every Baby Phat show by walking the runway with her daughters, Ming Lee and Aoki Lee, in hand. Of being a mother and a business woman, Simmons told Refinery29: "Of course having my babies on the runway with me is still number one for me as a mother. But I also really loved our front rows. The celeb and musician friends that supported the brand also inspired it - really innovative women who pushed the world forward to embrace the urban lifestyle when many in the business and in society at large did not have the vision or foresight [to do so]. This was a movement. People forget that."

Simmons was eventually appointed president and creative director of Phat Fashions, which included Baby Phat, Phat Farm, Baby Phat Girlz and Phat Farm Boys, thus becoming one of the first women of color ever to preside over a stable of fashion brands. During her tenure as Creative Director of Baby Phat, Simmons created an entirely new category of urban lifestyle apparel and accessories designed for women by women.

Baby Phat's commercial success (the company was at one point estimated to be worth in excess $1 billion) and cultural impact ultimately drove the expansion of Phat Fashions into a multitude of new product categories that included jewelry, handbags, footwear, swimwear, outerwear, infant accessories and fragrance, all of which were distributed on a global scale. Over time, the Baby Phat fragrance portfolio grew to include a total of six perfumes: Goddess, Golden Goddess, Seductive Goddess, Fabulosity, Luv Me, and Dare Me, the last of which was produced in Partnership with COTY Fragrances.

In 2010, Simmons parted ways with Phat Fashions and its parent company Kellwood. The following year, Simmons announced her new position as President and Creative Director of JustFab, a personalized shopping website. Simmons served in this role until 2015.

Following her tenure at JustFab, Simmons began work on the development of a new fashion label, and in the pre-fall season of 2015, KLS by Kimora Lee Simmons debuted its first collection. The namesake women's wear line offers upscale apparel at entry-level price points in the American designer category. Following development, KLS by Kimora Lee Simmons was marketed for nationwide placement within the designer arena at high-end luxury retailers such as Bloomingdale's, Lord & Taylor and Farfetch.

=== Reacquisition of Baby Phat ===
On International Women's Day, March 8, 2019, Simmons delivered the keynote address at the launch of the She Innovates initiative led by UN Women's Gender Innovation Coalition for Change (GICC). There, Simmons announced to Bloomberg News the reacquisition and forthcoming return of Baby Phat, by Kimora Lee Simmons. The new Baby Phat would retain the same ethos of female-empowerment as did the brand's first iteration by being woman-owned, woman-led and, as ever, designed for women by women.

Baby Phat relaunched in the summer of 2019 and then debuted a new signature collection in the fall of 2019. In an interview about the relaunch of Baby Phat, Simmons said to Women's Wear Daily: "The relaunch of Baby Phat will be comprised a mainstream sportswear collection for millennials targeted to the mid-tier retail level. Over the past several years, we realized that Baby Phat resonated with people and lives deep in their souls. Young people have an appetite for design with a purpose and place importance on a need for messaging that is similar to what Baby Phat represented in its prime and still can today."

=== Entrepreneurship and net worth ===
Simmons built a portfolio of investments in fashion, skin care, consumer goods and technology like Codage, an advanced technical skin care line based in France; Pureform Global, the first manufacturer of non-cannabis, non-hemp all natural CBD products; and Celsius, a "clean energy" negative calorie drink acquired in 2015. In the spring of 2019, Simmons co-launched Pellequr, a Beverly Hills spa with a novel take on the traditional Korean spa. As of 2021, Simmons was reported to have amassed a net worth of over $200 million.

== Personal life ==
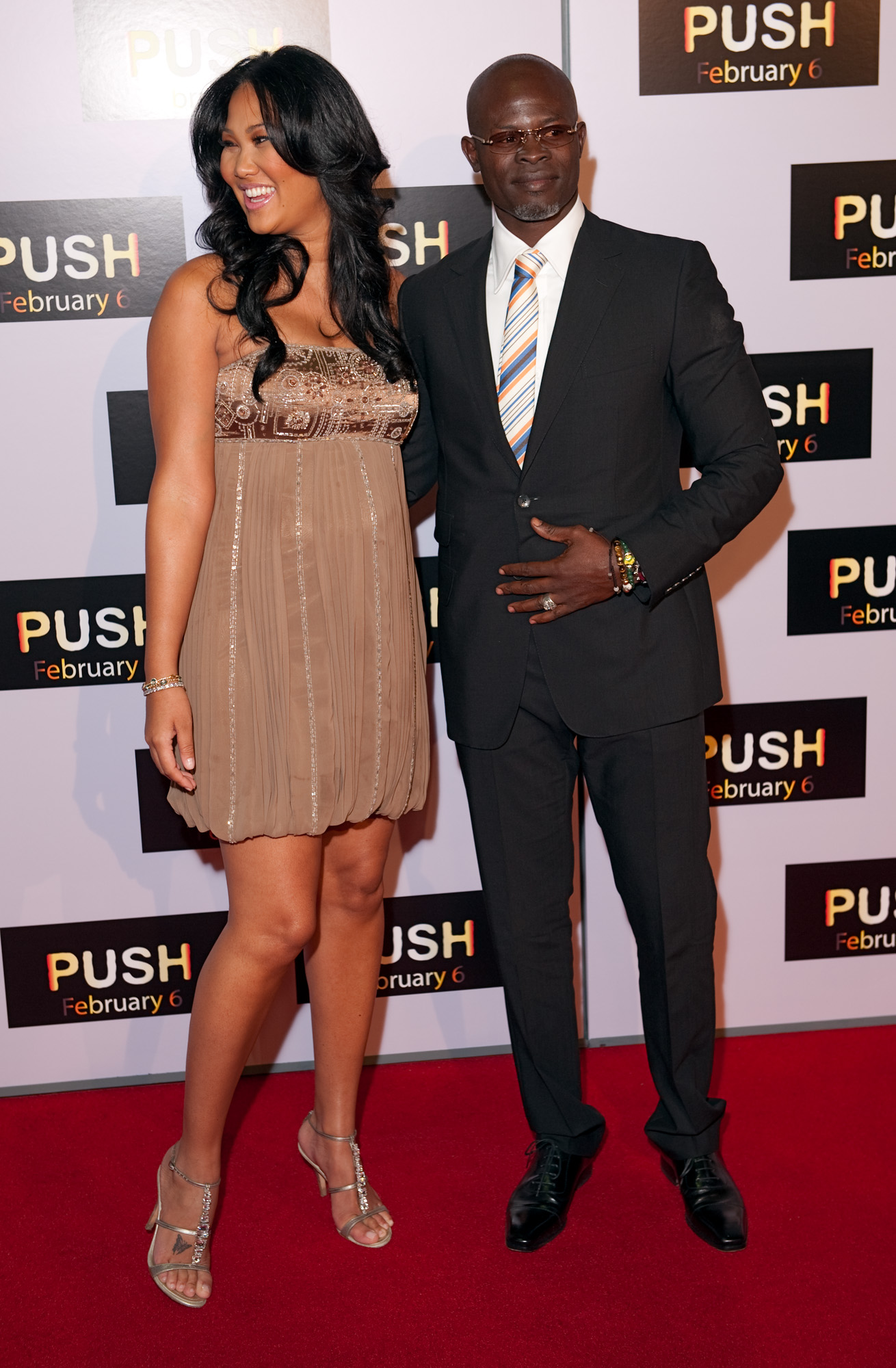
Kimora Lee Simmons with then-partner Djimon Hounsou at the Push premiere in 2009

Kimora Perkins married Russell Simmons in December 1998. They divorced in 2009 and share two daughters.

In May 2009, Simmons gave birth to her first son with actor and model Djimon Hounsou.

In February 2014, it was reported that she had married investment banker Tim Leissner and in April 2015, their son was born. At the time Simmons married Leissner, he was still married to his ex-wife; he forged divorce papers to show to Simmons, and created an email address in his ex-wife's name to further convince Simmons of the divorce. He continued the correspondence for over a year and continued using the email account for several years. In 2018, Leissner pleaded guilty in the 1MDB scandal and admitted being a double bigamist.

In 2020, Simmons adopted a 10-year old son, making her a mother of five children. In February 2022, it was revealed that Simmons and Leissner were estranged from each other. In 2023, Simmons filed a lawsuit against Leissner claiming that "shares worth about US$93 million that he was ordered to forfeit as part of his 1MDB guilty plea actually belong to her".

=== Philanthropy ===
Simmons has served on the Rush Philanthropic Arts Foundation.

In 2008, Simmons lent her voice and image to PETA in support of the organization's Be an Angel to Dogs campaign, which called for more humane consideration in the care and keeping of household pets. In the campaign, Simmons is pictured wearing angel wings designed by the costume maker, Martin Izquierdo, who is known for designing the angel wings worn by models in the Victoria's Secret Fashion Show. Simmons has also protested with PETA. Additionally, she donated $20,000 to PETA's Angel for Animals Project, which provides sturdy, custom-made dog houses to needy dogs.

On March 14, 2008, at a homecoming ceremony held at Washington University in St. Louis the mayor of St. Louis recognized Simmons's contributions to society by presenting her with the key to the city and declaring March 14 Kimora Day.

In 2014, Simmons established the Kimora Lee Simmons Scholarship Fund at FIT with a personal donation of one million dollars to aid students from underserved communities who are pursuing careers in fashion. Additionally, Simmons is an active supporter of amfAR, The G&P Foundation, Keep a Child Alive, and the Hetrick-Martin Institute.

As of 2018, Simmons has done humanitarian work in support of refugees and in-crisis migrant women and children fleeing violence, persecution and natural disasters in their home countries. As Lead Global Ambassador for intimate health nonprofit The Unmentionables, Simmons has helped to fund the distribution of reusable female hygienic products and supplies to communities of migrant and refugee women entering Europe through Greece. In 2017, Simmons and her family traveled to Texas with The Unmentionables to help with relief efforts following the devastation of Hurricane Harvey.

In 2018, Simmons delivered an address to The Global Innovation Coalition for Change (GICC), in partnership with UN Women to drive industry wide change and advance women and girls in innovation, technology, and entrepreneurship. She currently serves as a Global Innovator for Change, advocating for gender equality in the workplace. In September 2018, Simmons partnered with UN Women and GICC to help launch their Gender Innovation Principles and She Innovates calls to action.

In 2021, Simmons and Baby Phat partnered with Smile Train in the #AllSmilesAreBeautiful campaign to design and produce an exclusive limited edition All Smiles Are Beautiful t-shirt, with all net proceeds going to Smile Train's programs supporting mental health for children with cleft palates.

In August 2022, Simmons, Baby Phat and Phat Farm partnered with Family Dollar and Crayola to host a back-to-school giveaway benefiting families facing financial hardship in the Los Angeles area.

== Media and filmography ==
=== Television ===
Simmons has worked in television as a host, actress, reality star and producer. She was one of three hosts on the music and pop-culture weekly TV series, One World Music Beat, which aired in syndication from 1998-2001. Simmons also contributed to the VH1 projects Uncut New York Fashion Week and Party Fabulous. In 2003, Simmons appeared alongside Tyra Banks as a judge on season one of America's Next Top Model.

In 2007, Kimora: Life in the Fab Lane premiered on the Style Network. The reality series follows Simmons's daily life as she navigates the roles of business woman and mother. Kimora: Life in the Fab Lane aired from 2007-2011. In addition to starring in the series, Simmons produced four episodes of the show's inaugural season and executive produced ten episodes between 2009-2010. In 2013, The Style Network debuted Kimora: House of Fab. Unlike Kimora: Life in the Fab Lane, which showcases scenes from both Simmons's professional and personal lives, this second reality series focuses solely on Simmons's professional life as the Creative Director of online fashion company, JustFab. Kimora: House of Fab ran for one season with Simmons starring in and executive producing on each of the series's eight episodes. In 2025, a reboot titled "Kimora: Back in the Fab Lane" premiered on the Bravo Network.

Simmons received a Tony Award in 2003 for her work as a producer on Def Poetry Jam on Broadway.

=== Other media ===
Simmons is the author of the book Fabulosity: What It Is & How to Get It, which was published by Harper Entertainment in 2006. The female empowerment lifestyle manual received favorable reviews from such publications as the Washington Post and Boston Globe.

In 2006, Simmons joined the long list of celebrities from the fields of sports, media and entertainment who have donned milk mustaches for the Got Milk? campaign.

In February 2008, Mattel released the Kimora Lee Simmons Barbie Doll. Dressed in a faux chinchilla floor-length coat and hot pink thigh-high boots, mini skirt and peplum top, the doll was created under the direction Simmons to epitomize the brand identity she has cultivated across her life's many endeavors.

Simmons has appeared in multiple roles in television and films including Beauty Shop, Brown Sugar, and Waist Deep. She has also appeared in music videos for Ginuwine, Usher ("Nice and Slow"), and Rich Gang ("Tap Out"). In the early 2000s, Simmons was a cohost of Sony Television's sydicated talk show Life & Style.

== Filmography ==
=== Film ===
Year	Title	Role	Notes
1993	For Love or Money	Model	Alternative title: The Concierge
1999	The Big Tease	Dick Miyaki's Hair Model	
2002	Brown Sugar	Herself	
2005	Beauty Shop	Denise	
2005	Rebound	Female Reporter #1	
2006	Waist Deep	Fencing House Lady	

=== Television ===
Year	Title	Role	Notes
2001	For Your Love	Shamira	1 episode
2003	America's Next Top Model	Judge	Judge for cycle 1
2007–2011	Kimora: Life in the Fab Lane	Herself	
2013	Kimora: House of Fab	Herself	
2025–	Kimora: Back in the Fab Lane	Herself	

=== Video games ===
Year	Title	Role	Notes
2004	Def Jam: Fight for NY	Herself	
2006	Def Jam Fight for NY: The Takeover	Herself	

=== Music video appearances ===
Year	Title	Original artist(s)	Director(s)
1998	"Nice & Slow"	Usher	Hype Williams
2003	"Change Clothes"	Jay-Z (feat. Pharrell)	Chris Robinson
2003	"In Those Jeans"	Ginuwine	Cleetis Mack
