= Mike Finnigan =

American keyboard player and vocalist (1945–2021)

- Born: Michael Kelly Finnigan; April 26, 1945; Troy, Ohio, U.S.
- Died: August 11, 2021 (aged 76) Los Angeles, California, U.S.
- Genres: Rock; R&B; jazz; blues
- Occupation: Session musician
- Instruments: Keyboards, vocals
- Years active: 1966–2020
- Labels: Capitol, Blue Thumb, Columbia, Warner Brothers, CBS
- Spouse: Candy Finnigan (m. 1969)

Michael Kelly Finnigan (April 26, 1945 – August 11, 2021) was an American keyboard player and vocalist, his specialty being the B3 Hammond organ. Working primarily as a freelance studio musician and touring player, he played with a wide variety of musicians in pop, rock, blues and jazz.

== Life and career ==
Finnigan was born in Troy, Ohio, and attended the University of Kansas on a basketball scholarship.

Finnigan toured with and sessioned for Jimi Hendrix, Joe Cocker, Etta James, Sam Moore, Crosby Stills and Nash, Dave Mason, Buddy Guy, The Manhattan Transfer, Taj Mahal, Michael McDonald, Maria Muldaur, Peter Frampton, Cher, Ringo Starr, Leonard Cohen, Tower of Power, Rod Stewart, David Coverdale, Tracy Chapman, Los Lonely Boys, and Bonnie Raitt.

Finnigan recorded Early Bird Café with the Serfs in the late 1960s, with Tom Wilson producing. The Serfs were the house band at a nightclub in Wichita, Kansas at the time. He then toured and cut an album with Jerry Hahn, The Jerry Hahn Brotherhood released in 1970. He recorded two solo records in the 1970s, one with Jerry Wood. He later collaborated with two other Columbia artists, Les Dudek and Jim Krueger, with whom he formed the DFK Band (Dudek, Finnigan, and Krueger) in 1978. Subsequently, his work featured on a CD by the Finnigan Brothers (NashFilms Records), a collaboration with his younger brother Sean and founding member of Bread, Robb Royer.

Finnigan also made a guest appearance in the short-lived police procedural musical television series, Cop Rock (1990). In his only acting credit, Finnigan portrayed a singing shift lieutenant in the cold open of episode 7, "Cop-a-Feeliac". After a shift briefing, Finnigan breaks in to song, telling his officers, "Let's Be Careful Out There". The song itself is an homage to a catchphrase popularized by the show Hill Street Blues, created by Steven Bochco, who also produced Cop Rock.

Finnigan was twice a winner of a Blues Music Award (formerly W.C. Handy Award) for his work with Taj Mahal as a member of the Phantom Blues Band. He was always active politically and was, for several years, a regular contributor to the weblog Crooks and Liars. In 2013 and 2014, he was nominated for a Blues Music Award in the 'Pinetop Perkins Piano Player' category.

== Personal life ==
He was married for 51 years to Candy Finnigan, an intervention counselor who appeared on the television show Intervention. They have two children: a daughter, Bridget, and a son, Kelly. Finnigan was an active blogger, with a fondness for liberal/progressive causes and commentary.

== Death ==
Finnigan died from liver cancer on August 11, 2021, in Los Angeles at the age of 76.

== Partial discography ==
- 1969: The Serfs – The Early Bird Cafe, Capitol Records
- 1968: Jimi Hendrix – Electric Ladyland
- 1970: Jerry Hahn – The Jerry Hahn Brotherhood
- 1971: Tommy Bolin – Whirlwind
- 1971: Big Brother and the Holding Company – How Hard It Is
- 1972: Finnigan and Wood – Crazed Hipsters
- 1974: Dave Mason – Dave Mason
- 1976: Mike Finnigan – Mike Finnigan, Warner Bros. Records
- 1977: Peter Frampton – I'm in You
- 1977: Dave Mason – Let It Flow
- 1978: Ben Sidran – A Little Kiss in the Night
- 1978: Les Dudek – Ghost Town Parade
- 1978: Mike Finnigan – Black & White, Columbia Records
- 1978: Jim Krueger – Sweet Salvation
- 1979: The Dudek Finnigan Krueger Band – Special Tour Sampler
- 1980: Cher – Black Rose
- 1982: Crosby, Stills & Nash – Daylight Again
- 1983: Crosby, Stills & Nash – Allies
- 1984: Stephen Stills – Right By You
- 1988: Crosby, Stills & Nash & Young – American Dream
- 1993: I Mother Earth – Dig
- 1993: Buddy Guy – Feels Like Rain
- 1994: Crosby, Stills & Nash – After the Storm
- 2000: Tracy Chapman – Telling Stories
- 2000: David Coverdale – Into the Light
- 2004: The Mooney Suzuki – Alive & Amplified
- 2005: Taj Mahal – Taj Mahal & the Phantom Blues Band: Live in St. Lucia
- 2006: The Phantom Blues Band – Out of the Shadows
- 2006: Keb' Mo' – Suitcase
- 2007: Zen Blues Quartet – Again and Yet Again
- 2007: Joe Cocker – Hymn for My Soul
- 2007: The Phantom Blues Band – Footprints
- 2008: The Eclectic Beast Band – Living the Music
- 2010: Various Artists: The Imus Ranch Record II – "Part Time Love" (with the Phantom Blues Band)
- 2010: Mike Finnigan – Mike Finnigan [reissue], Wounded Bird Records
- 2010: Willie Basse – Break Away
- 2011: Finnigan and Wood – It's Only a Rock and Roll Show (recorded 1971, previously unreleased)
- 2011: Trampled Under Foot – Wrong Side of the Blues
- 2011: The Phantom Blues Band – Inside Out
- 2012: Bonnie Raitt – Slipstream
- 2013: Eric Burdon – 'Til Your River Runs Dry
- 2013: Kara Grainger – Shiver & Sigh
- 2014: Trampled Under Foot – Badlands
- 2014: Dave Mason – Future's Past
- 2014: Hilary Scott – Freight Train Love
- 2016: Annika Chambers – Wild & Free
- 2017: Danielle Nicole – Cry No More, Concord Records
- 2018: Jay-Bee & the Ultratone Allstars – Life Ain't Got No Shortcuts
- 2020: The Phantom Blues Band – Still Cookin'
- 2022: L.A.X. LaRue-Alexander
- 2026: Mike Finnigan Forty Below Records
