= List of Intervention episodes =

This is a list of episodes for Intervention, an American reality television program which aired on the A&E Network since 2005.

Each episode follows one or two participants, each of whom has an addiction or other mentally and/or physically damaging problem and believes that they are being filmed for a documentary on their problem. Their situations are actually being documented in anticipation of an intervention by family and/or friends. Episodes typically feature an epilogue or follow-up months later with an update to the addicted person's progress or state.

As of January 13, 2017, the series consisted of a total of 265 episodes and 10 specials. Most episodes are available individually on DVD from A&E's website.

== Series overview ==
Season	Episodes	Originally released	
Season	Episodes	First released	Last released
1	14	March 6, 2005	August 21, 2005
2	21	October 30, 2005	December 17, 2006
3	15	March 16, 2007	September 7, 2007
4	10	December 3, 2007	March 17, 2008
5	17	June 23, 2008	November 30, 2008
6	14	December 15, 2008	March 23, 2009
7	17	May 25, 2009	October 19, 2009
8	18	November 23, 2009	May 10, 2010
9	9	June 28, 2010	August 22, 2010
10	13	December 13, 2010	March 21, 2011
11	12	June 20, 2011	September 12, 2011
12	13	January 2, 2012	April 2, 2012
13	21	August 13, 2012	February 4, 2013
14	12	June 13, 2013	December 30, 2014
15	29	January 6, 2015	August 30, 2015
16	33	March 6, 2016	January 3, 2017
17	8	July 31, 2017	September 18, 2017
18	9	January 2, 2018	February 27, 2018
19	8	June 5, 2018	May 21, 2019
20	6	August 6, 2019	September 10, 2019
21	8	July 20, 2020	September 14, 2020
22	20	March 15, 2021	September 27, 2021
23	8	October 18, 2021	December 6, 2021
24	6	June 13, 2022	July 25, 2022
25	18	April 22, 2024	August 26, 2024

== Episodes ==
=== Season 1 (2005) ===
No. overall	No. in season	Subject(s)	Addiction topic(s)	Original release date
1	1	"Alyson and Tommy"	crack cocaine, morphine / cocaine	March 6, 2005
2	2	"Gabe and Vanessa"	compulsive gambling / compulsive shopping	March 13, 2005
Epilogue: Gabe joined Sara, Matt and Alyson in the Follow Up Special (Episode 14), which aired August 21, 2005. He told Jeff van Vonderen how the initial program had changed him but that he was still very depressed, so Jeff offered him a second visit to the treatment center, this time to focus on his depression. Gabe wanted to go back but could not commit as he had got a good job offer at the same time and being broke, needed to make money. Instead he started intensive psychiatric treatment, worked at the new job, and stopped gambling. As of the show airdate, he stated his parents gave him only limited support, and that he has remained gambling free. However, Gabe's severe, pervasive narcissistic personality disorder likely renders his addiction untreatable. Vanessa spent a month in treatment and says that her intervention was not successful. On August 30, 2018, Vanessa was shot and killed by police who responded to a wellness check in her home and she pointed a BB gun at them.
3	3	"Tamela and Jerrie"	self-harm / hydrocodone	March 20, 2005
Epilogue: Jerrie left treatment after three months and moved in with her boyfriend. She says she is sober, but her sister says she is not. Tamela completed six months of treatment and has not self harmed since October 2004.
4	4	"Alissa and Brian"	compulsive gambling / methamphetamine	March 27, 2005
Epilogue: Alissa refused to go to treatment. She and her boyfriend later broke up. She married a new man in 2006. She says she continues to gamble, but hardly does it anymore. Brian was asked to leave rehab after 40 days for breaking the rules. He relapsed after the intervention and returned to treatment several times. In September 2007, he moved into a sober-living facility in Florida. Brian died on November 29, 2016, due to a medical error in treating an infection. He was sober.
5	5	"Sara"	methamphetamine	April 3, 2005
Epilogue: Sara completed four months of treatment and returned to her family. She was granted partial custody of her daughter and got a job as a correctional officer. She has been sober since her intervention.
6	6	"Travis and Matt"	methamphetamine / crack cocaine	April 17, 2005
Epilogue: Travis immediately walked out of the intervention, but later decided to accept the offer of treatment. After completing his program, he moved to Utah and began traveling and playing music. He suffered a brief relapse, but regained sobriety in September 2005 and maintained it until September 2007, when he had another relapse; he has since stayed sober. Matt had several relapses, then joined the United States Navy. He no longer uses drugs, but still drinks.
7	7	"Peter and Renee"	video game addiction / bulimia	May 1, 2005
Epilogue: Peter completed 40 days of treatment and returned home. He says he has learned to communicate better with his family. However, he still plays video games. Renee continues to go to treatment four times a week.
8	8	"Tina"	prescription drugs	May 8, 2005
Epilogue: Tina left treatment after 37 days. She and Harley divorced in 2007; Tina says she no longer uses pain medication.
9	9	"Cristine and Kelly"	alcohol / anorexia	June 5, 2005
Epilogue: Kelly gained 15 pounds since the intervention. She and Jason moved in together. She no longer goes to therapy. Cristine relapsed in February 2006 after a miscarriage but stopped when she learned she was pregnant again. She has been sober since July 2006.
10	10	"Kelly F. and Mark"	alcohol / prescription drugs	June 12, 2005
Epilogue: Kelly walked out of the intervention, but agreed to go to treatment on the condition that he could pick up his dog first. He transferred to another program after 20 days and spent a total of 60 days in treatment, but immediately purchased and drank beer upon leaving, saying that he never wanted to get sober. Five months later, he and his girlfriend had broken up and he had lost his dog again. Mark completed treatment in 2005, had his morphine pump removed and no longer uses opiates to control his pain. He still lives with his family and is still unemployed. He never spoke to his wife again; she died two months after he completed his program.
11	11	"Rachel and Tommy Update"	heroin, prostitution / cocaine	June 26, 2005
Epilogue: Tommy moved to the east coast and works as a finance manager. He has been sober since September 30, 2004. Rachel walked out of treatment after one week, but returned the next day. Since completing treatment, she relapsed several times but is trying to stay clean. She now works as a manager in a retail store.
12	12	"Michael and Randi"	aggressive anger / bulimia, methamphetamine	July 10, 2005
13	13	"Michael and Brooks"	alcohol, prescription drugs / prescription drugs	July 24, 2005
14	14	"Follow-Up: Sara, Matt, Gabe & Alyson"	TBA	August 21, 2005

=== Season 2 (2005–06) ===
No. overall	No. in season	Subject(s)	Addiction topic(s)	Original release date
15	1	"Corrine"	heroin / methamphetamine	October 30, 2005
Epilogue: Corinne was kicked out of the first treatment center for getting drunk on the grounds. She transferred to another treatment center, in which she left early. Corinne relapsed several times after leaving treatment, but became sober when she learned that she was pregnant. She gave birth to a daughter, and had another daughter a few years later. Corinne died in March 2019 of a heroin overdose.
16	2	"Audrey and Howard"	heroin / alcohol abuse	November 6, 2005
17	3	"Adam and Michael"	heroin / anger management, crack cocaine	December 4, 2005
Epilogue: Michael was kicked out of treatment for threatening other patients. Shortly after returning home, he assaulted his girlfriend, was arrested, and sent to jail. Adam successfully completed treatment and is now working as a production assistant.
18	4	"Heidi and Michelle"	plastic surgery addiction, compulsive shopping / methamphetamine	December 11, 2005
Epilogue: Heidi left treatment after only 30 days, and received more cosmetic procedures. Michelle joined a counseling group and was told she no longer had to attend due to her progress. She then married her high school sweetheart and is expecting her first child. She has been sober since September 19, 2005.
19	5	"Salina and Troy"	bulimia / methamphetamine	January 8, 2006
Epilogue: Salina completed treatment, returned home and had a son with her husband; she has not binged or purged since September 2006. Troy tested positive for HIV shortly after starting treatment. After completing his program, he stayed sober for over a year but suffered a relapse. He then went through an outpatient program and has remained sober since November 2007.
20	6	"Kristen"	alcohol abuse, heroin	January 15, 2006
Epilogue: Kristen relapsed several times but got sober in 2007. She gave birth to a son in October 2006 and regained custody of her daughter Sadie in 2008.
21	7	"Follow-Up: Cristine, Brooks, Ian, Audrey"	TBA	January 22, 2006
22	8	"Antwahn and Billy"	crack cocaine / opiates, methadone	March 12, 2006
Epilogue: Billy completed treatment and moved into sober living program, but suffered a number of relapses and moved back to New York. He has remained sober since July 2006. After completing his own treatment, Antwahn relapsed and moved back to Los Angeles. He spent four months in jail on a theft charge, after which he became sober and was put into the work-release program; he has maintained sobriety since July 2007.
23	9	"Annie and Amy"	methamphetamine / eating disorder	March 19, 2006
Epilogue: According to a November 2008 re-airing, Selena went through her own treatment for anorexia and transferred to another facility to continue working on healthy weight gain. Annie left her program after one month, had a relapse and re-entered treatment; she relapsed again, but has since stopped binging and purging. She broke up with her boyfriend and married an old friend, with whom she now has two children. Amy went through rehab, got clean and moved back to California to re-join Tom and got a job as a waitress. He accepted an invitation from the producers to go through his own meth rehab, but left the program after 11 days. Now he works in construction and says he has been sober since the intervention, while Amy says no longer uses meth but drinks on special occasions.
24	10	"Chuckie"	heroin	March 26, 2006
Epilogue: Chuckie was kicked out of treatment after 69 days for using heroin. Within five months, he had been arrested on a car theft charge. A November 2008 re-airing revealed that he ultimately served a total of 15 months in prison on this charge and that his ex-girlfriend gained sole custody of his son. He has since been released and is back in treatment.
25	11	"Gina and Andrea"	drug abuse, problem gambling / alcoholism, cocaine, marijuana	April 2, 2006
Epilogue: Gina immediately fled the intervention, but she eventually returned after being pursued by her family and agreed to go to treatment. Gina has been sober since the intervention, returned to Las Vegas and got a job. Andrea entered treatment, and after 4 months moved to North Carolina. She stopped using cocaine but continues to drink.
26	12	"John"	alcohol abuse, crack cocaine	July 9, 2006
Epilogue: John moved back to Massachusetts after completing his program and got a job in a cancer treatment facility. He has been sober since February 2006.
27	13	"Follow-Up: Antwahn and Rachel"	TBA	July 16, 2006
28	14	"Tammi and Daniel"	alcohol abuse / methamphetamine	July 23, 2006
Epilogue: Tammi completed 90 days of treatment, then returned home and served 90 days in jail for past DUI offenses. She now works as a dental assistant, sees her children regularly and has been sober since February 2006. After Daniel completed his program, he had several relapses and then moved into sober living. He moved to Florida to be closer to his sisters and has been sober since April 2007.
29	15	"Mike and James"	speedballs / methamphetamine	July 30, 2006
Epilogue: After Mike left treatment he spent 3 days in jail for drunk driving and criminal mischief. He returned to his parents' house and began visiting his children regularly. Mike continues to drink but stopped using drugs. James completed his 40-day program. He moved home and relapsed with alcohol but stopped drinking soon after. He began seeing his children regularly and got a job at an insurance company. He has not used meth since his intervention.
30	16	"Tim"	crack cocaine	August 6, 2006
Epilogue: While in treatment, Tim got a job playing piano at a hotel. He completed 90 days of treatment and moved back in with Madyson, but relapsed. The two broke up and Tim moved back in with his parents. He says he is sober.
31	17	"Betsy"	alcohol abuse	August 13, 2006
Epilogue: Betsy reluctantly agreed to go to treatment along with her boyfriend. However, once they got to the airport, they decided to return home to try to get sober on their own. Betsy tried to contact her family on several occasions, but they refused to talk to her. In June 2006, Betsy entered a treatment facility. Betsy died due to breast cancer on August 8, 2018.
32	18	"Cristy"	methamphetamine, alcohol abuse	August 20, 2006
Epilogue: Cristy, who had left rehab early against her family's wishes and entered jail rather than bow to the pressure of returning for 60 more days of treatment, was given a choice by the judge at her sentencing for her DUI arrest: Rehab for two years, or 90 days in jail. Cristy chose jail. While in jail, she was able to get clean from both meth and alcohol, but relapsed six weeks after her release. After the episode was re-aired in March 2009, it showed that Cristy was living with her grandfather and continued to drink and use drugs. As of June 2010, Cristy works in Las Vegas and has claimed to have found Jesus. As of early 2015, Cristy gave birth to a baby boy, but lost custody of him to his father because of Cristy's drinking.
33	19	"Sylvia"	alcohol abuse	December 3, 2006
Epilogue: Sylvia returned to North Carolina after completing her 90-day treatment program in California. She resumed work in interior design and pursued certification to become a drug/alcohol counsellor. Her first ex-husband granted her unsupervised visits with their children; she has been sober since June 2006. Sylvia is now a certified addiction counsellor and interventionist and has joined the Intervention programme as an interventionist – she made her first appearance in that capacity in the episode that aired on August 16, 2015 – she conducted an intervention on Erin, a 36-year-old IV Dilaudid user.
34	20	"Jessie and Laurie"	bulimia / prescription drug abuse	December 10, 2006
Epilogue: Jessie successfully completed treatment for bulimia, has returned to college at Oregon State and has not binged or purged since the intervention. After the episode was re-aired in March 2008 Laurie had successfully completed treatment at a rehab center and was working to regain custody of her children until she overdosed on heroin and Oxycontin in January 2008; she recovered from the overdose and as of March 2008 is back in treatment near her home so that she can continue to work on her relationship with her children. Laurie died on July 8, 2015. The cause of death is not publicly known.
35	21	"Lauren"	heroin	December 17, 2006
Epilogue: As a condition to get Lauren to agree to go to treatment, Mike, who had a desire to get back into recovery and wanted to be a role model for Lauren, was allowed to move in temporarily with Lauren's family. The show's producers offered to get Mike into treatment in a nearby facility in Pennsylvania; Mike eagerly accepted but had many issues during his second stint in rehab and his relationship with Lauren is strained. Lauren managed to get sober and worked for Oasis, a drug treatment centre, in Anaheim, California until she relapsed in November 2007; she returned to recovery and was sober since January 2008. During Lauren's initial rehab stay, her childhood friend Déa died of a drug overdose. The episode carries a dedication "In Loving Memory of Déa". Update: Lauren returned to school, founded a wellness and counselling company dedicated to overcoming addiction. She gave birth to a boy in 2012 and had been sober for eight years before succumbing to lung cancer on May 24, 2016.

=== Season 3 (2007) ===
No. overall	No. in season	Subject(s)	Addiction topic(s)	Original release date
36	1	"Ryan"	Oxycodone	March 16, 2007
37	2	"Kim"	anorexia, bulimia, self-injury	March 23, 2007
38	3	"Jacob"	alcoholism	March 30, 2007
39	4	"Anthony"	Cocaine	April 6, 2007
40	5	"Trent"	drug abuse	April 20, 2007
41	6	"Dillon"	Methamphetamine	April 27, 2007
42	7	"Jessica and Hubert"	Heroin, alcoholism	May 11, 2007
43	8	"Laney"	alcoholism	June 1, 2007
44	9	"Ashley"	drug abuse	June 8, 2007
45	10	"Andrea and Ricky"	drug abuse	June 15, 2007
46	11	"Leslie"	alcoholism	June 22, 2007
47	12	"Coley"	Methamphetamine	August 10, 2007
48	13	"Caylee"	bulimia, drug abuse	August 17, 2007
49	14	"Pam"	alcoholism	August 24, 2007
50	15	"Jill"	alcoholism	September 7, 2007

=== Season 4 (2007–08) ===
No. overall	No. in season	Subject(s)	Addiction topic(s)	Original release date
51	1	"Emily"	eating disorder	December 3, 2007
52	2	"Dawn and Fabian"	drug abuse, alcohol abuse	December 10, 2007
53	3	"Follow Up: Ryan and Hubert"	TBA	December 17, 2007
54	4	"Brooke"	prescription drug abuse	January 7, 2008
55	5	"Jason and Joy"	alcohol abuse, drug abuse	January 14, 2008
56	6	"Josh and Ben"	obesity, drug abuse	January 21, 2008
57	7	"Tressa"	drug abuse	January 28, 2008
58	8	"John T."	alcohol abuse, drug abuse	February 4, 2008
59	9	"Brad"	PTSD, drug abuse, alcohol abuse	March 24, 2008
60	10	"Lawrence"	drug abuse, alcohol abuse	March 17, 2008

=== Season 5 (2008) ===
No. overall	No. in season	Subject(s)	Addiction topic(s)	Original release date
61	1	"Chad"	alcohol, crack cocaine	June 16, 2008
Epilogue: Chad walked out of the intervention, but accepted the offer of treatment after a subsequent one-on-one meeting with Jeff Van Vonderen. Chad completed treatment, moved into sober living with plans to attend college and bought a new racing bike. A February 2009 re-airing stated that he relapsed briefly with alcohol, but has since regained sobriety and maintained it since September 2008; he is also competing in races and has joined the Amore & Vita professional cycling team. At the beginning of October 2009, the Sacramento Bee reported Gerlach was again living on the streets after leaving a rehab facility in September. However, according to a March 2010 follow-up episode, he is living part-time with his girlfriend, with whom he has a baby daughter, and has been sober since December 2009.
62	2	"Dan"	alcohol	June 23, 2008
Epilogue: Dan completed four months' treatment and moved back to Hawaii to reunite with his family. An April 2010 re-airing stated that he had a brief relapse after eight months' sobriety, then moved into sober living; his wife divorced him in January 2009 and he continues to drink.
63	3	"Sandra"	prescription drugs	June 30, 2008
Epilogue: At the end of an October 2008 re-airing reveals that Sandra completed six months of treatment and moved back to Las Vegas, while her husband and sons went through a program for addicts' families. She has been sober since February 2008.
64	4	"Charles"	alcohol, heroin	July 7, 2008
Epilogue: Charles was kicked out of his program for having syringes mailed to him, but transferred to another one in Florida. A November 2008 re-airing revealed that he subsequently moved into sober living, but relapsed after one month; now he lives back on the streets in California and is again using heroin. He was arrested for using his brother's identity and has been in jail since September 2009. Update: Charles died of an overdose on March 10, 2014
65	5	"Marie"	alcohol	July 14, 2008
Epilogue: Marie completed treatment and moved to Alabama. Her two daughters are now attending 12-step meetings; a November 2008 re-airing further noted that her son moved in with her five months after the intervention. She has been sober since March 2008. Marie died of breast cancer in February 19, 2019.
66	6	"Tom"	heroin	July 21, 2008
Epilogue: Tom now has weekly contact with his family and hopes to become a drug/alcohol counselor when he finishes treatment. He has been sober since January 2008; his wife had been planning to divorce him, but has not gone ahead with it.
67	7	"Asa"	alcohol, bulimia	July 28, 2008
Epilogue: Asa completed treatment, returned to college and is now applying to graduate school. He has been sober since March 2008 but, as of December 2008, has binged and purged several times since the intervention.
68	8	"Derek"	alcohol	August 4, 2008
Epilogue: Derek was kicked out of treatment after three months for getting drunk and bringing alcohol onto the grounds. He went on a four-day drinking binge, then returned to his home in Ontario. His girlfriend rented a room from him for some time, but eventually moved out after he threatened to hurt himself; he has since attempted suicide several times and is still drinking. Derek died in an alcohol-related traffic accident in December 2016.
69	9	"Allison"	inhalants	August 11, 2008
Epilogue: Allison immediately walked out of the intervention; in response, her family called her "sugar daddy" (Allison's sole source of income) to ward him off and called The Humane Society to have her cats taken away. When animal control officers, the police and her sister arrived at her house, she became argumentative and was forcibly removed for a psychiatric evaluation. She was subsequently released from the hospital and accepted Jeff's final offer of treatment the next day. Her treatment has helped her cope with the underlying issues that are causing her self-destructive behaviors. Now she speaks with her mother and sisters every week and, as of July 2009, has stopped contact with her "sugar daddy." Sober since May 2008, she now works at a treatment center in California. In a March 2015 update, it is confirmed she is still sober and doing very well, enjoying her new role helping others with their treatment.
70	10	"Intervention In-Depth: Meth Mountain"	methamphetamine	August 18, 2008
Narrated by Meredith Vieira. In Marshall County, Alabama, crystal meth has permeated the rural community on all fronts, to the point where the area has earned the nickname "Meth Mountain." Affected individuals featured on the show include Chuck, a man who may lose custody of his children because of his addiction; Boo, a long-time addict who looks far older than his 58 years; Shanta, who injected meth while she was pregnant; and Dr. Mary Holley, a crusading obstetrician whose addicted brother committed suicide.
71	11	"Phillip"	alcohol	August 25, 2008
Epilogue: Phillip underwent treatment, but his girlfriend Teresa would not commit to doing the same in a separate offer from Jeff. A November 2008 re-airing revealed that he remained sober for four months, then had a brief relapse. He has since moved to Washington, is living with a friend he met in treatment and has been sober since September 2008. By 2009, it was reported on a replay of the episode that Phillip and his girlfriend Teresa were working for the rehab center.
72	12	"Mike and Jenny"	OCD / heroin, methamphetamine, prescription drugs	September 1, 2008
Epilogue: Mike completed nearly three months of treatment, moved back to his apartment in Utah and began taking medication for his OCD. An April 2009 re-airing revealed that he recently stopped the medication due to financial difficulties. A subsequent re-airing in late 2011 revealed that Mike died in September 2011. Jenny relapsed on heroin after one month in treatment and soon learned that she was pregnant. The same re-airing revealed that she returned to treatment to undergo a safe detox and gave birth to a healthy baby girl; she has been sober since August 2008.
73	13	"Intervention After-Treatment Special"	drug abuse	September 8, 2008
Three of the show's interventionists and five former addicts are featured guests on this episode, hosted by Christopher Lawford and recorded before a studio audience. Jeff Van Vonderen, Candy Finnigan and Ken Seeley discussed their respective motivations for entering the field, after which clips from the addicts' episodes were shown and the addicts themselves commented on their experiences during and after treatment. The addicts, with their comments on sobriety as of the tape date: *Sylvia — 2 years, 1 month *Michelle — 3 years; has since given birth to a child.: Hubert — 1 year, 7 months. Hubert's friend John, who figured prominently in the original episode, made contact with his daughter and has also received help; now he is living in Indiana.; Dillon — said he was "sober today"; his mother Tammy was not sure that he was really recovering, since he had left his treatment program early and would not commit to returning to a 12-step program. Dillon asserted that 12-steps did not work for him – each time he went through one, he left treatment and immediately went on a meth binge – and that "relying on God" to keep him on the right path worked best for him. He declined an offer from Ken to enter a new program, saying that he wanted to find his own way to sobriety.; Coley — 1 year, 3 months. His wife Francine and their children went through a treatment program for family members of addicts. The couple announced during the show that their 14th wedding anniversary fell on that day.; Jeff Van Vonderen disclosed that he had taken a leave of absence from Intervention in order to sort out personal issues associated with a relapse into his own past addiction.
74	14	"Kristen"	cocaine, heroin	September 22, 2008
Kristen is a 20-year-old who injects heroin and cocaine. She prostitutes herself on the streets of Baltimore to get high. She usually injects the drugs into the artery in her neck. During the intervention Kristen is very emotional, but agrees to treatment as she realizes she will die if she doesn't get help. Epilogue: Two months after entering treatment, Kristen's mother visits her. Kristen is clearly doing much better and both she and her mother nearly break down into tears at the sight of each other. She and her mother develop a much better relationship as a result. Kristen has a brief relapse before completing treatment, but gets sober again afterwards and the episode states that she has been sober since September 22, 2008. Afterwards, Kristen moves back in with her family. She is now working as a waitress.
75	15	"Ed and Bettina"	alcohol	September 29, 2008
Ed, 53 and Bettina, 49, had a picture-perfect life, including three adoring kids, a dream home, sports cars, motorcycles and a respected place in their church community. But six years ago, Ed made a bad career move and ended up unemployed. He and Bettina lost everything they had worked for. They began to drink and quickly became alcoholics. Ed has been hospitalized for internal bleeding and Bettina for withdrawals so excruciating she thought she was dying. Their children have begged them to stop drinking, but it only strengthens the bond between Ed and Bettina. Epilogue: Ed and Bettina completed their respective treatment programs and moved into sober living in Florida. He plans to find a job in sales, while she is now a house mother in a sober-living facility; they have been sober since June 2008. April 2009 Epilogue Update: Ed and Bettina completed their respective treatment programs and moved into sober living in Georgia. Ed is a natural gas salesman, Bettina works in a supermarket. Bettina suffered a brief relapse after 5 months of sobriety, but has been sober again since December 3, 2008. Ed has remained sober since his intervention.
76	16	"Intervention In-Depth: Prescription Addiction"	TBA	October 20, 2008
Narrated by Bill Kurtis. Abuse of prescription medications has led to hundreds of overdoses and deaths in and around Tampa, Florida, in recent years. The experiences of three addicts are highlighted during this hour: Matt, whose brother introduced him to drugs before Matt entered high school; Brian, who began "doctor shopping" and forging prescriptions to feed his habit; and Tim, an unemployed 20-year-old whose mother Teri, herself a recovering addict, provides the money and shelter to enable his addiction.
77	17	"Intervention In-Depth: Heroin Hits Home"	TBA	November 30, 2008
Narrated by Donnie Wahlberg. This episode examines the recent rash of drug abuse among high school students in and around Brockton, Massachusetts – first OxyContin, then heroin. The experiences of four such addicts (Pat, Peter, Sarah, Shannah) are profiled.

=== Season 6 (2008–09) ===
No. overall	No. in season	Subject(s)	Addiction topic(s)	Original release date
78	1	"Janet"	alcoholism, sexual addiction	December 15, 2008
Epilogue: Janet completed treatment. She moved back in with Russ and her children. She is no longer dating Bud. Janet says she drinks occasionally.
79	2	"Nicole"	eating disorder (dysphagia), prescription drug abuse, child neglect	December 22, 2008
Epilogue: Nicole spent two months in treatment, during which time she learned to swallow baby food, then moved back home with her husband. She has stopped abusing her medications and plans to start seeing a therapist for help with post-traumatic stress disorder. Although she still uses the feeding tube, she has gained more than 25 pounds since the intervention.
80	3	"Brittany"	drug abuse, prostitution	December 29, 2008
Epilogue: Brittany left treatment after three weeks and moved back to Alabama, where she now lives with her boyfriend. She began a methadone program and is no longer using Dilaudid; her mother plans to begin seeing a counselor for help with PTSD. A recent re-airing of this episode revealed that she broke up with her boyfriend and later spent over a month in jail for drug possession. She has been sober since January 2010.
81	4	"John C"	self-injury through neglect of personal health	January 5, 2009
Epilogue: After two months in treatment, John was asked to leave for failing to follow the plan laid down for him. He moved back home with his parents, where he began to look after himself properly and gained 35 pounds. He has kept his blood sugar under control since September 2008. John died on September 30, 2014 from a heart attack.
82	5	"Follow Up: Tressa and Josh"	drug abuse, eating disorder	January 12, 2009
This episode revisits the cases of Tressa, whose drug habit ruined both her family relationships and her chances of qualifying for the 2000 Olympics and of Josh, a morbidly obese compulsive eater whose family worried about both his health and his father's. Update: Tressa attempted to qualify for the 2008 U.S. Olympic trials, but fell just short of the needed mark. She went home to Nebraska, her first visit since the intervention, to attend her mother's wedding. At the 2008 USA Track and Field Masters Championships, she won four gold medals. At the time of Josh's first visit home to attend his brother's graduation, the first time his family had seen him since the intervention, he had lost 172 pounds. While in treatment, he outed himself to his parents and ex-girlfriend; his brother subsequently outed himself as well. As of May 2009, Josh has lost a total of 253 pounds and is living in Florida, where he works at a treatment center. As of October 2011, Josh lost 260 pounds, but his weight continues to fluctuate though he does work on controlling it. His diabetic father underwent four months' treatment for obesity and anger management and lost 60 pounds, but has since regained most of that weight but has become a better father.
83	6	"Casie"	drug abuse, bulimia	January 19, 2009
Epilogue: Casie and John dropped out of treatment after a month. They moved in together. A few months later they broke up. Hank and her mother completed their family treatment program at the Betty Ford Clinic. Casie became sober in March 2009 and got pregnant. She ended up having a healthy baby boy.
84	7	"Anthony"	drug abuse, alcohol abuse	January 26, 2009
Epilogue: Anthony's mother continues to drink but her family says she is drinking less and she also started to see a counselor. Anthony spent seven months in treatment, then had a relapse and left; he was recently hospitalized following a drinking binge. His family has continued to hold to their bottom lines however.
85	8	"Lana"	drug abuse, alcohol abuse	February 2, 2009
Epilogue: Lana completed treatment and lives in a sober living facility in Florida. She broke up with her boyfriend. She plans to work as an esthetician. Lana has been sober since October 9, 2008.
86	9	"Angelina and Peggy"	drug abuse	February 9, 2009
Epilogue: Despite claims of sobriety, in treatment Peggy admitted she was using drugs prior to the intervention. Angelina and Peggy both completed treatment and they speak to each other once a week. Angelina remained in California and got married. Peggy has been sober since September 29, 2008; Angelina had a brief relapse with methadone but has been sober since November 11, 2008.
87	10	"Chris"	alcoholism	February 16, 2009
Epilogue: Three months after the intervention Chris' partner Shawn visits him at treatment and he noticeably looks better. Chris feels much better off alcohol and accepts that his problems with his family are the fault of his drinking. Shawn goes through counseling himself for Chris' drinking. After leaving treatment, Chris moves back in with Shawn but relapses two months later. Chris checked himself back into treatment and vowed to stay sober for at least six months once he gets out. Unfortunately, Chris relapsed again and eventually took his own life on August 28, 2009, becoming the third addict profiled on the show to die of complications caused by their addiction.
88	11	"Intervention In-Depth: Compulsive Gambling"	gambling	February 23, 2009
89	12	"Nik / Tiffany"	heroin, alcoholism	March 2, 2009
Epilogue: Tiffany relapsed six months after treatment. She broke up with her boyfriend and moved into a sober-living facility. Tiffany's mother continues to drink. Tiffany has been sober since November 22, 2009. Nik relapsed one month after treatment. His family continues to hold their bottom lines and his son is being raised by Nik's sister. Nik is living in Washington and continues to use heroin. Nik died on November 29, 2014 from post surgery complications.
90	13	"Sandy"	alcohol abuse, drug abuse	March 16, 2009
Epilogue: While in treatment, Sandy received news that her husband, a recovering alcoholic, was going to divorce her. She relapsed by buying and drinking a bottle of mouthwash; ten days later, she was kicked out of the program for doing so again and for abusing her prescription medications. Her husband has remained sober since the divorce; she lived in a homeless shelter and resumed drinking for some time, but later moved back home. She became sober in February 2009. According to an October 2011 update, Sandy was sober and present at each of her daughters' weddings; Subsequently, Sandy died in June 2011.
91	14	"Sharon"	compulsive shopping, body dysmorphic disorder, self-injury	March 23, 2009
Epilogue: Sharon completed treatment and moved back home. She had several relapses but has not hit herself since October 2010.

=== Season 7 (2009) ===
No. overall	No. in season	Subject(s)	Addiction topic(s)	Original release date
92	1	"Gabe V."	drug abuse	May 25, 2009
Epilogue: Gabe relapsed twice, but completed five months of treatment. He has made amends with his father and has been sober since March 30, 2009.
93	2	"Jeff"	alcoholism	June 1, 2009
Epilogue: After treatment, Jeff and Lorena moved in together and had another child. Jeff is once again a firefighter and has been sober since September 2009.
94	3	"Sonia and Julia"	eating disorder	June 8, 2009
95	4	"Donald"	drug abuse	June 15, 2009
Epilogue: Donald completed treatment, but relapsed on crack and alcohol soon afterward. He and his girlfriend broke up, and he returned to treatment.
96	5	"Jason B."	drug abuse	June 22, 2009
Epilogue: Jason agreed to go to treatment. After he left, the interventionist offered his mother Kathy to go to treatment for anxiety, in which she has abused Xanax to control. She initially refused, but eventually agreed to go. However, she left after only 19 days and returned home. She and her husband attended family therapy sessions. Jason completed treatment and stayed in Florida. He has been sober since December 24, 2008.
97	6	"Nikki"	drug abuse	July 6, 2009
Epilogue: Nikki left treatment after only 23 days. Her boyfriend and one-time drug dealer, Joe, paid for her flight home. As of June 2010, Nikki had not used methadone since July 2009.
98	7	"Bret"	alcoholism	July 13, 2009
Epilogue: Bret later died and became the second person to die after being on this show.
99	8	"Aaron/ Andrea"	methamphetamine abuse, alcoholism	July 20, 2009
Epilogue: Aaron died May 16, 2023 from pancreatic cancer.
100	9	"Danielle"	oxycodone abuse	July 27, 2009
Epilogue: Five weeks after returning from treatment, Danielle separated from her husband, who gained sole custody of their two kids. She moved to Michigan and returned to Surrey where she got pregnant. Danielle's father no longer drinks. Danielle has been sober since October 2010.
101	10	"Chad and Brooke (follow-up)"	crack cocaine abuse, prescription medication abuse	August 3, 2009
102	11	"Joey"	heroin abuse	August 10, 2009
Epilogue: Joey completed 3 months of treatment, returned to Pittsburgh, and returned to work as a tattoo artist. After six months sober, Joey relapsed and returned to treatment. He has been sober since 25 April 2010.
103	12	"Sebastian and Marcel"	heroin abuse	August 17, 2009
Epilogue: The family home was burglarized by an intruder looking for drugs while the intervention was taking place. Sebastian and Marcel's parents and older brother completed family co-dependency treatment at the Betty Ford Center. Sebastian and Marcel both left treatment early and relapsed. Sebastian re-entered and completed treatment and has been sober since August 2, 2009. Marcel, however, never returned to treatment. He no longer uses heroin but continues to abuse Xanax. Sebastian died of a stroke related to heroin abuse on April 11, 2013..
104	13	"Gloria"	alcoholism	August 24, 2009
Epilogue: Gloria completed treatment, sees her daughters regularly, has gone back to work and school and has been sober since April 23, 2009.
105	14	"Marci"	methamphetamine addiction	August 31, 2009
Epilogue: While in treatment, Marci was diagnosed with bipolar disorder and sent to a psychiatric hospital, where she was prescribed medication to stabilize her condition. She then returned to treatment, but was subsequently expelled for refusing to take her medication. She soon relapsed on crystal meth and returned to California to live with her mother, who bought her an SUV. Marci totaled it two months later and, as of April 2011, has resumed her drug habit.
106	15	"Intervention in Depth: Addiction in Uniform"	alcoholism; cocaine abuse	September 14, 2009
Looking at veterans of Iraq and their struggles with addition caused by combat stress. Leia is an alcoholic, Paul turned to cocaine and alcohol, and Matt also drank to alleviate some of the anxiety and painful images that remained when they came home.
107	16	"Follow-up: Gabe V. and Allison Follow-Up"	heroin abuse	September 21, 2009
108	17	"One Man Rehab"	TBA	September 28, 2009
The nation's leading "sober companions" go the distance to help high risk addicts who are struggling with relapse transition into sober living environments. Donna helps Tara stay off meth so she can see her daughter again. Mike helps a teen client who has been living in a gang house stay away from drugs and stop his progression into even harder drug use.

=== Season 8 (2009–10) ===
No. overall	No. in season	Subject(s)	Addiction topic(s)	Original release date
109	1	"Linda"	Fentanyl abuse	November 23, 2009
Epilogue: Linda's mother completed two weeks of co-dependency treatment while the son who cared for Linda, Sam, moved back in with his parents in Connecticut. Two months into her treatment, Linda was diagnosed with a delusional disorder and moved into a residential care home. Linda hasn't used Fentanyl since the intervention.
110	2	"Greg"	morphine	December 7, 2009
Epilogue: Three months after the intervention, Greg is doing noticeably better, playing basketball, moving around a lot better and saying he's no longer in so much pain. It was revealed that during his treatment Greg admitted to doing methamphetamine and cocaine and was diagnosed with bipolar disorder. Greg also had surgery to remove benign polyps from his throat. After his treatment was over, Greg returned home to his wife and has not used methamphetamine or cocaine since before his intervention and is managing his bipolar disorder. As of the June 22, 2010 re-airing, Greg has not abused pain medicine since July 25, 2009.
111	3	"Jennifer"	alcohol	December 14, 2009
Epilogue: Jennifer was kicked out of treatment after 47 days for drinking. Her family and friends held the bottom lines and refused to buy her a plane ticket home. Jennifer moved into a sober living facility in Florida, where she remained sober for four months until relapsing. In 2013, Jennifer moved into a homeless shelter and got sober. She went back to school in Phoenix and is studying social work.
112	4	"Rob"	alcohol, methamphetamine abuse	December 21, 2009
113	5	"Amy W."	alcohol, anorexia, self-harm	December 28, 2009
114	6	"Sarah"	oxycodone	January 4, 2010
Epilogue: While in rehab, Sarah called off her engagement to the massage parlor owner she was living with, and as of early May 2010, she has been sober since September 9, 2009.
115	7	"Jackie"	alcohol	January 11, 2010
Epilogue: Jackie completed treatment and returned home. She and her daughter Anna attend counseling and see each other every Sunday. She has been sober since September 6, 2009. She died on January 10, 2013.
116	8	"Vinnie"	crack cocaine	January 18, 2010
Epilogue: Vinnie left after 29 days; his mom flew him home. His mother attended the Betty Ford Center for Families. Vinnie has relapsed several times, but claims to be sober since March 12, 2010 However, his mother says he is still using.
117	9	"Robby"	alcoholism	January 25, 2010
Epilogue: After completing three months of treatment, Robby moved into an apartment with his girlfriend and their daughter. Robby and his girlfriend married shortly after. Following a brief relapse, Robby had been sober since July 4, 2010. Robby died in 2025.
118	10	"Intervention in Depth: Huffing"	inhalant abuse	February 1, 2010
The dangers of inhalant abuse, including computer dusters, solvents and gasoline, are exposed.
119	11	"Marquel"	alcohol, compulsive exercising	February 8, 2010
Epilogue: Marquel continues to drink, party and exercise compulsively, her children live full time with her ex-husband and her father and sisters refuse to speak with her. A January 2012 re-airing revealed that she was arrested for DUI and spent two months in jail. She got clean in jail, and has been sober since May 17, 2010.
120	12	"Kristine"	alcoholism	February 15, 2010
Epilogue: Kristine's leukemia-like symptoms were found to be the result of her excessive drinking, not leukemia. After completing 90 days of treatment, Kristine returned home to her family in Utah. She had been sober since November 4, 2009. Update: Kristine appeared on the Dr. Phil show in 2014. She relapsed on alcohol and has been drinking hand sanitizer for at least 2 years.
121	13	"Shane"	alcoholism, Oxycontin, prescription drugs	February 22, 2010
Epilogue: Shane completed treatment and moved into a sober-living facility in Florida. He returned to Arizona and cared for his ailing grandmother before her death. He has been sober since November 2, 2009
122	14	"Rocky"	crack cocaine	April 5, 2010
Epilogue: Against the advice of his counselors, Rocky left treatment after 90 days. He returned to New Jersey where he continues to train his friend Bobby. Rocky talks to his sons every week and has been sober since November 9, 2009. Rocky died February 7th, 2019 after a series of strokes while in hospice care.
123	15	"Ashley"	heroin abuse	April 12, 2010
Epilogue: After 5 months in rehab, Ashley left treatment against the wishes of her counselors. She moved back to Las Vegas where she soon relapsed on heroin. Her aunt and uncle refused to let her move back in. She lives with her mother and is enrolled in a methadone program.
124	16	"Amy P."	anorexia, bulimia	April 19, 2010
125	17	"Tyler"	crack cocaine, methamphetamine abuse, heroin, prescription drug abuse	May 3, 2010
Epilogue: Tyler left treatment after 8 days. He still continues to drink and use drugs. His father, despite attending codependency treatment, allowed Tyler back into his home, but kicked him out 15 months later after catching him stealing. As of August 2012, Tyler is in jail for violating his parole. In the September 2018 reairing of the episode, the title cards stated that Tyler got sober while spending six months in jail and has not used drugs since October of 2011.
126	18	"Richard"	crack cocaine	May 10, 2010

=== Season 9 (2010) ===
No. overall	No. in season	Subject(s)	Addiction topic(s)	Original release date
127	1	"Donna and Josh"	alcoholism	June 28, 2010
Epilogue: Donna had several relapses since completing treatment and returned to treatment in September 2011. Josh gained joint custody of his daughter after he completed treatment. He says he drinks occasionally.
128	2	"Adam"	alcoholism, post-traumatic stress disorder	July 5, 2010
Epilogue: Adam stormed out of the intervention when his family asked him to go to treatment. Despite the nurse telling him and his girlfriend that he was bleeding from his esophagus, Adam refused to go to treatment. His family went to treatment on their own and held their bottom lines. Adam eventually stopped drinking and had a daughter with his girlfriend in May 2011. He still lives with her and is working full time.
129	3	"Miriam"	phencyclidine (PCP)	July 12, 2010
Epilogue: Miriam agreed to enter treatment, and after completing three months in an inpatient facility, she moved into a sober living facility in Florida. As of the show's airing, she was speaking with her daughter regularly and had been sober since March 12, 2010. As of March 2015, Miriam had moved back to California and her daughter had moved in with her. She is still sober.
130	4	"Andrew"	Oxycodone	July 19, 2010
Epilogue: Andrew completed three months of treatment and moved to Vancouver. Three months after that, he briefly relapsed on heroin. Andrew joined his father and brothers in Alberta. He has been sober November 7, 2010. His father Dan went to treatment for a gambling addiction and has not gambled since the intervention.
131	5	"Amber"	alcohol abuse, bulimia nervosa	July 26, 2010
Epilogue: Amber binged and purged several times while in treatment. Her family, even though they agreed to go, never went to the Betty Ford clinic. Amber has not used alcohol since the intervention and has not binged or purged since May 28, 2010.
132	6	"Lorna"	crack cocaine	August 2, 2010
133	7	"Joe"	self-asphyxiation, heroin	August 9, 2010
Epilogue: Joe agreed to enter a treatment center, and he was still there as of the episode's airing. He reports that his relationship with his father has improved, he is no longer in contact with his addict friends, and he has not used heroin or self-asphyxiated since February 8, 2010. A later re-airing revealed that Joe relapsed on heroin two months after completing treatment and then returned to treatment. While there, he missed a court date, and subsequently spent six months in prison. He has been sober since April 2011. Joe died of brain injury on September 1. 2018.
134	8	"John / Dionicio"	alcoholism, heroin	August 16, 2010
Epilogue: John left treatment early and returned to his alcoholic lifestyle. His family and friends have held the bottom lines they outlined in the intervention. Dionicio completed treatment and returned to his family. He was sober for five months before relapsing and leaving home. He and his wife reconciled and he has been sober since September 2011.
135	9	"Ryan / Jason"	alcoholism, heroin	August 23, 2010
Epilogue: A December 2010 re-airing revealed that six weeks after completing treatment, Jason relapsed and moved back to Florida. Another airing in August 2014 revealed that he was arrested for selling drugs and court-ordered back to treatment. Now Jason has a job at a treatment center and has been sober since December 2010. Ryan completed 90 days of treatment, moved home and briefly relapsed. He has been sober since February 20, 2010. Ryan died on September 14, 2014.

=== Season 10 (2010–11) ===
No. overall	No. in season	Subject(s)	Addiction topic(s)	Original release date
136	1	"Rachel"	cocaine, methamphetamine abuse, heroin	December 13, 2010
Update: Rachel's ex-boyfriend, Joseph "Joie" Minozzi was found dead in San Francisco on January 12, 2012, of stab wounds to the torso. Joie had been sober and employed as a window-washer. A tribute to him on Rachel's Facebook page read, "I love you babyboy. always and forever. NO MATTER WHAT."
137	2	"Darick"	methamphetamine, OxyContin	December 20, 2010
138	3	"Michelle / Austin"	alcohol abuse, heroin	December 27, 2010
Epilogue: Three months later, Michelle lives in sober living and is better dealing with his transgender issues, changed his name to Felix and is transitioning. As Felix, he is much happier, a change that his family accepts and supports, saying that Felix is now much more comfortable with himself. Felix has been sober since July 27, 2010. Austin was kicked out of treatment for noncompliance after two months while his family completed dependency treatment. Austin gave up his addiction on his own and had been sober since December 7, 2010, with plans to go to college, but on November 30, 2011, Austin died of what was believed to be a heroin overdose.
139	4	"Erin"	methamphetamine	January 3, 2011
Epilogue: Erin completed 37 days of treatment and became a mother to her child again. She and her husband began constructing a multi-story lake house, which they completed and subsequently started a real estate business. Erin also began talking to her estranged father again. Her husband, who self-proclaimed himself to be an alcoholic, did not attend 12-step meetings but he maintained sobriety. Erin has been sober since July 2010.
140	5	"Jimmy"	methadone	January 10, 2011
Epilogue: Three months later, both Joannie and Jimmy are doing much better. Joannie is recovering well from her alcoholism and drug addiction and the rehab center is helping her deal with her lupus pain and she is doing much better. She has been sober since November 19, 2010. Jimmy also is recovering well and finally admits to the fact that he's an addict. After treatment, he moved to North Carolina and has contact with his son and father every week. He briefly relapsed but has been sober since April 15, 2011. He has been diagnosed with epilepsy and is taking medication as directed after suffering a fractured skull during a seizure.
141	6	"Cassie"	crack cocaine, oxycodone	January 17, 2011
Epilogue: Cassie attended treatment and recovered from her addiction. She was able to forgive the people who hurt her in her life and admitted to being unruly at the intervention and was even able to joke about it. Cassie completed treatment and moved back to Florida, but totaled her car in June. She claims to be clean, but her family thinks she's using again.
142	7	"Jimbo"	painkillers, benzodiazepines	January 24, 2011
Epilogue: Jimbo threatened his interventionist with violence and was given the choice of rehab or jail. Jimbo chose rehab but was expelled for fighting after 30 days. After relapsing in December 2010 and subsequently breaking his leg in a car accident, he was arrested for driving while intoxicated in 2011.
143	8	"Jenna"	heroin	January 31, 2011
144	9	"Benny"	alcoholism, various drugs	February 7, 2011
Epilogue: Benny initially refused to go to treatment, but changed his mind shortly after the intervention ended. Benny completed treatment, returned home to Ohio and enrolled in college. He has been sober since December of 2010.
145	10	"Megan / MaryAnne"	crack cocaine, alcoholism	February 21, 2011
Epilogue: MaryAnne is still in treatment at the time of this episode's airing. She plans to move back with her children in Utah. She has been sober since November 17, 2010. Megan and her boyfriend completed treatment, however after several months of sobriety Megan relapsed on meth.
146	11	"Jamie"	alcoholism	March 7, 2011
Epilogue: Jamie attended treatment and moved into sober living. She has been sober since December of 2010. Susan patched things up with her family and fiance, but John refused any treatment or counseling.
147	12	"Tiffany"	methamphetamine	March 14, 2011
Epilogue: Tiffany left treatment after 42 days on a flight paid for by her grandfather. She returned to live with her grandparents and her daughter Tylee. In May 2011, Tiffany was arrested for battery and criminal mischief. She proceeded to return to treatment and got sober in June 2011.
148	13	"Michael"	methamphetamine	March 21, 2011
Epilogue: Michael completed his treatment and returned to San Diego. Despite a very positive outlook after his intervention, he relapsed shortly after returning home. Michael's ex-wife Roxanna held her bottom lines.

=== Season 11 (2011) ===
No. overall	No. in season	Subject(s)	Addiction topic(s)	Original release date
149	1	"Brittany"	heroin	June 20, 2011
Epilogue: Brittany went to treatment after using heroin one more time. After treatment, Brittany relapsed and then returned to treatment and enrolled in nursing school. She had been sober since January 2013.
150	2	"Sarah / Mikael"	heroin	June 27, 2011
Epilogue: Sarah and Mikeal went to treatment separately. Sarah and Mikeal broke up after Sarah relapsed; she returned to treatment and has been sober since July 20, 2012. Mikeal also relapsed and returned to treatment, and has been sober since May 14, 2012.
151	3	"Eddie"	alcoholism	July 4, 2011
152	4	"Latisha"	crack cocaine	July 11, 2011
Epilogue: Latisha finished treatment and went home to Michigan, but shortly thereafter she relapsed and then returned to treatment. She got a job at a treatment center and wants to become a sober coach; she has been sober since March 8, 2012.
153	5	"Larry / Megan"	alcoholism / multiple drugs	July 18, 2011
Epilogue: Larry's wife and stepfather walked out on the pre-intervention, ultimately rendering Larry's intervention unsuccessful. Two months after rejecting treatment, Larry was arrested for drunk driving and assault. He has since moved out of state and reduced his drinking. Megan completed treatment and moved to North Carolina. She suffered a brief relapse and has been sober since December 6, 2011. However, on February 9, 2014, Megan died from a heroin overdose.
154	6	"Penny-Lee"	alcoholism	July 25, 2011
Epilogue: Penny Lee completed treatment and moved back to Hawaii. Her husband and daughter attended the Betty Ford Family Program. Her husband stopped drinking when she came home and she has been sober since March 31, 2011.
155	7	"Luke / Shantel"	crack cocaine / oxycodone	August 1, 2011
Epilogue: After two weeks, Shantel left treatment and started using again. She became pregnant four months later and returned to treatment. Luke completed treatment and moved in with his mother and stepfather. His mother completed the Betty Ford Center's Family Program. Luke has been sober since April 5, 2011 and as of 2014 has been sober for three years.
156	8	"Tiffany D."	methamphetamine	August 8, 2011
Epilogue: After the pre-intervention, Tiffany's grandparents informed Tiffany of the intervention. As a result, Tiffany would not show up and her family had to confront her at the courthouse. Tiffany called the police saying the show was lying about her doing drugs and was exploiting her family. After getting into a physical confrontation with her mother and brother, she fled the scene. Three days later, she was arrested for possession of crystal meth and returned to live with her grandparents, but was kicked out three months later. Her mother attended the Betty Ford Family Program and held her bottom lines. Three months after the intervention, Tiffany entered treatment and has been sober since August 1, 2011. Tiffany also had a daughter in November of 2012.
157	9	"Brittney / Ricardo"	alcoholism / methamphetamine	August 15, 2011
Though she initially resisted, Brittney ultimately agreed to go to treatment, but left treatment after 11 days and moved in with her boyfriend where she continues to drink. Her mother is holding her bottom lines. Ricardo completed three months of treatment and stayed in California. He speaks with his children regularly and has been sober since May 6, 2011.
158	10	"Michelle"	methadone, alprazolam	August 22, 2011
Epilogue: Michelle agreed to go to treatment; while in treatment she ended her relationship with her 75-year-old boyfriend Sam. After treatment, Michelle returned home to New Jersey, and has been sober since December of 2011.
159	11	"Jeff"	alcoholism	August 29, 2011
Epilogue: Jeff left treatment after 22 days. He borrowed money and bought a bus ticket home. He and his sons moved into his parents' home, where they continue to be monitored by DHS. Jeff continues to drink. According to his Facebook page, Jeff is married again and is sober. Jeff died of kidney failure on November 17, 2016.
160	12	"Jeanna"	methamphetamine	September 12, 2011

=== Season 12 (2012) ===
No. overall	No. in season	Subject(s)	Addiction topic(s)	Original release date
161	1	"Christina"	painkillers, methamphetamine	January 2, 2012
Epilogue: Christina agreed to go to treatment after her mother refused to let her continue living in the house. One month into her treatment program, she was diagnosed with bipolar disorder and prescribed medication. After 97 days, she was kicked out for breaking the rules, then moved back in with her mother and relapsed on meth. Christina's father and brother are holding their bottom lines; according to an August 2012 re-airing, she says she is sober. Christina then moved in with her father and had a son in January 2013.
162	2	"Dallas"	heroin	January 9, 2012
Epilogue: Dallas has been sober since June 19, 2011. She broke up with her boyfriend and he entered treatment. So did her mom.
163	3	"Richard K."	methamphetamine	January 16, 2012
Epilogue: Richard immediately fled the intervention. His friend tried to chase him down, but he escaped. His family was sent out to find him, but he was nowhere to be found. His brother wrote him a letter on Facebook to invite him to the meeting, but he still didn't show up. Three months later, Richard's mother completed a co-dependency workshop and held her bottom lines. Four days after his mother completed treatment, Richard checked himself into treatment in Ontario. His mother came to visit him, but he has not spoken with his brother since the intervention. Richard returned to Ontario after completing treatment. He briefly relapsed after seven months of sobriety and has been sober since June 2012.
164	4	"Kimberly"	alcoholism	January 23, 2012
Epilogue: After completing treatment, Kimberly moved in with her boyfriend Steven and was arrested four days later after a police officer smelled alcohol on her breath. She was sentenced to 120 days in jail; both Steven and her mother Meg attended counseling at the Betty Ford Center. Kimberly and Steven eventually broke up, and after several relapses, Kimberly got sober in January 2013. However, as of 2015, Kimberly has been diagnosed with cirrhosis and hepatitis C and has been given 6 months to live.
165	5	"Suzon"	crack cocaine	January 30, 2012
166	6	"Dorothy / Ivan"	alcohol, cocaine, self-harm / PCP	February 6, 2012
Epilogue: Dorothy walked out of the intervention, but eventually agreed to go to treatment. She completed her program, stayed in Utah, and has been sober since September 14, 2011; her family attended counseling at the Betty Ford Center. After treatment, Ivan got a job and started work on a new album, but relapsed after five months. As of a November 2012 re-airing, he continues to use PCP.
167	7	"Zeinah"	prescription drug abuse	February 13, 2012
168	8	"Skyler / Jessa"	bath salts / methamphetamine abuse, alcohol abuse	February 20, 2012
Epilogue: Skyler entered treatment and was diagnosed with schizoaffective disorder. At the time of airing, it was not known whether his use of "bath salts" was a contributing factor. Jessa completed three-plus months of treatment and returned to Minnesota. Six months later, she relapsed with marijuana. On October 16, 2020, Skyler died.
169	9	"Julie"	alcoholism	February 27, 2012
Epilogue: Julie went to treatment and has been sober since May 2012. She moved in with her parents and son, maintaining daily contact with her daughter and attending 12-step meetings with her son.
170	10	"Courtney"	heroin	March 5, 2012
Courtney, 20, lives in Miami and injects heroin up to eight times a day, prostituting herself to support both her own habit and her boyfriend's. Her mother, sister, and grandmother want her to get help and are ready to use Florida's legal system to force her into it if they have to. Epilogue: Courtney immediately fled the intervention. A month later, her family signed documents to have her involuntarily sent to court-ordered drug treatment under Florida's Marchman Act. After evading the authorities for two months, she agreed to go to treatment, but left 11 days later against her counselors' advice. She returned to Miami and has resumed her drug use, but has had no contact with her family. She requested treatment several times but never attended a program. She died in 2020 at the age of 29.
171	11	"Sean"	alcoholism	March 12, 2012
Growing up in a rough neighborhood, and having an openly gay father, Sean developed anxiety problems. He showed promise as a popular local DJ, but his musical aspirations were ruined once he turned to alcohol. He now drinks constantly, relying on his daughter to look after him and pay the bar tabs he can no longer afford. Epilogue: Sean agreed to go to treatment, but began to have second thoughts during the drive to the center. He agreed to meet with the interventionist the next morning to continue the journey, but never showed up. He moved in with his girlfriend, continued to drink, and had no contact with his father; his daughter planned to attend family counseling at the Betty Ford Center. On his Facebook page, it was revealed that Sean died of liver failure in January 2014 from alcohol abuse.
172	12	"Kaylene"	prescription drug abuse	March 26, 2012
Epilogue: Against professional advice, Kaylene left treatment after nine days and returned to North Carolina. She moved in with her mother and enrolled in a methadone program. Kaylene has been sober since March of 2012.
173	13	"Terry D. / Leon"	alcoholism / PCP	April 2, 2012
Epilogue: Terry completed treatment and moved into a sober-living facility in Texas. She has been sober since November 18, 2011. Leon walked out of the intervention after his girlfriend told him she didn't want him to go to treatment. After some convincing from his family members, he agreed to go. He only completed 28 days of treatment and moved back to Connecticut. He broke up with his girlfriend and says he is sober.

=== Season 13 (2012–13) ===
No. overall	No. in season	Subject(s)	Addiction topic(s)	Original release date
174	1	"Nichole"	alcoholism	August 13, 2012
Epilogue: Nichole completed 99 days of treatment, then left against professional advice. Within 24 hours, she was arrested for public intoxication. She then returned to treatment and realized that in order to live the life she desires, she could never drink again. She moved to Victoria, British Columbia, and works at a sober living facility. She had a brief relapse after four months of sobriety, but recovered and has stayed sober since October 2012.
175	2	"Elena"	methamphetamine, prescription drug abuse	August 13, 2012
Epilogue: After assurances from her daughter and granddaughter that they too were entering treatment, Elena agreed to go. She completed three months of treatment, then returned home to California, where she now lives with and cares for her aged mother. Elena's granddaughter, Sarah, is the subject of episode 190.
176	3	"Katie"	alcoholism, bulimia	August 20, 2012
Epilogue:' Katie agreed to go to treatment at Timberline Knolls after hearing her mother's plan to attend treatment and get sober. In treatment, Katie revealed that she dropped out of college after being raped. Katie completed a 90 day treatment program, but her mother left treatment 8 weeks early and returned home to her husband. Katie moved back in with her parents, relapsed, and returned to treatment at Shades of Hope in Texas. Katie completed an 86-day treatment and moved to San Diego. She has no contact with her family.
177	4	"Dennis"	methamphetamine	August 27, 2012
Epilogue: Dennis left treatment after only three days and relapsed on meth. His family maintained their bottom lines and attended 12 step programs. Eight months after he left treatment, Dennis entered a 30-day treatment program, but relapsed again shortly after completing it.
178	5	"Diana"	methamphetamine, alcoholism	September 10, 2012
Epilogue: While in treatment, Diana was diagnosed with bipolar disorder. She completed treatment and moved into a sober living facility. She has no contact with her boyfriend Billy and has been sober since February 23, 2012.
179	6	"Britney / Terry K."	bath salts, cocaine / fentanyl	September 17, 2012
Epilogue: Britney left treatment after 14 days and relapsed on Suboxone. Britney continued to use. Her family maintained their bottom lines. Epilogue: Terry left treatment after 48 days. He went back home and obtained a job as a chef. He has been sober since June 2012.
180	7	"Amanda"	alcoholism / heroin	October 1, 2012
Amanda, 31, abandoned her dreams of becoming a teacher in favor of heavy drinking (four bottles of wine a day) and a heroin addiction. Her boyfriend is also an addict, and her PTSD-afflicted father provides money and support to feed her habits. Epilogue: After Amanda completed three months of treatment, her boyfriend accepted a 30-day scholarship to the same program. She moved in with him after he finished, and the two have been attending regular 12-step meetings; she has been sober since December 19, 2011. Amanda's father has not undergone counseling for his PTSD, but he has begun sleeping in his bed instead of his office.
181	8	"Susie / Miriam"	crack cocaine / alcoholism	October 8, 2012
182	9	"Ryan"	alcoholism	October 15, 2012
Epilogue: Ryan completed treatment and returned home to his fiancee and daughter. His family attended the Betty Ford program. Ryan got a job teaching children with disabilities and he and his fiancee are planning their wedding. He has been sober since April 5, 2012.
183	10	"Cher"	alcoholism	October 22, 2012
Epilogue: Cher's father died while she was in treatment; she relapsed one day after completing the program. Her daughter Brooke stays in contact with her each week and plans to attend counseling at the Betty Ford Center. Cher says she is sober, but her family believes she is still drinking.
184	11	"Al"	methamphetamine, prescription drug abuse	October 29, 2012
Epilogue: Al completed three months of treatment. He began working part-time at a restaurant near the treatment center and was still in treatment at the time of airing.
185	12	"Megan"	heroin	November 19, 2012
Epilogue: Megan completed four months of treatment, after which she moved into sober living and enrolled in beauty school. She states that she's gotten along a lot better with her dad, but her relationship with her mother has not improved. She completed six months of probation and has been sober since May 19, 2012.
186	13	"Kelly"	methamphetamine, OxyContin	November 26, 2012
Kelly is a 27-year-old mother who turned to drugs to handle the trauma of being sexually abused by her sister's boyfriend when she was 11. Today, Kelly is using meth up to 4 times a day, as well as taking up to 400 mg of OxyContin. Epilogue: While in treatment, Kelly was diagnosed with post-traumatic stress disorder. Kelly completed treatment and returned home. She is studying for her GED and plans to enroll in college. Kelly has been sober since May 29, 2012.
187	14	"Nick"	heroin	November 26, 2012
Epilogue: Nick disrupted the flight carrying him to treatment as it was about to land in Dallas, Texas, after becoming agitated during the flight and threatening the safety of other passengers. He was arrested on landing and charged with felony flight disruption. Nevertheless, the show's producers managed to get him to treatment in Florida, where he completed four months of treatment. However, he was hit by a car while still in treatment and injured his back. He was prescribed morphine to manage the pain, which ultimately led to his relapse on heroin and his removal from treatment. He later went to detox and moved into a sober living near his girlfriend and says he is sober. At the time of airing, no further information on the flight disruption charge was available.
188	15	"Sandi"	alcoholism	December 3, 2012
Epilogue: Sandi left treatment after 121 days against the advice of her counselors. She returned home and reunited with her daughter Andrea. Three weeks later she returned to treatment to continue counseling. Sandi has been sober since June 15, 2012.
189	16	"Alissa / Terry"	crack cocaine / bath salts	December 10, 2012
Epilogue: Alissa completed treatment but relapsed one week later on Xanax and meth. Her parents held their bottom lines but Alissa continues to use marijuana. Terry's son Chris completed treatment and has been sober since April 8, 2012. Terry relapsed but returned to treatment one month later. Terry speaks to Chris weekly and has been sober since November 4, 2012.
190	17	"Sarah P."	methamphetamine	December 17, 2012
Epilogue: Sarah refused to participate in the intervention, which was held at her mother's house. Sarah elected to move out and take her son with her, but called the police to claim her family was kidnapping her son after her family refused to tell her where her son was. Sarah eventually agreed to go to treatment after talking to Candy Finnigan and a police officer in the officer's car. After 30 days, Sarah left treatment against the advice of her counselors. She returned to California with her son, Jacoby. Elena has been sober since her intervention and invites Sarah to 12-step meetings regularly. Sarah continues to use alcohol and marijuana.
191	18	"Tiffany"	heroin	January 21, 2013
Epilogue: While in treatment, Tiffany traveled to Haiti to do service work. She completed 125 days of treatment and plans to return to Haiti to continue with the relief work. Her father, who is an alcoholic, refused treatment and continues to drink. Tiffany has been sober since August 16, 2012.
192	19	"Dana"	various drugs	January 28, 2013
After losing three of her four children to a horrific house fire, 32-year-old Dana of Alvin, Texas, spirals into a severe drug addiction to numb her pain while her desperate, grieving family pleads with her to stop. Epilogue: Dana's family received trauma counseling and moved to a farm in Arkansas; she joined them there after completing treatment. She returned for a two-week outpatient program in January 2013, has maintained regular contact with her son, and has not used crack or painkillers since the intervention.
193	20	"Sean"	alcoholism	January 28, 2013
Epilogue: On the day of the intervention, Sean's wife Jules came to Sean's parents' house to meet them. When she saw that the interventionist Jeff was there, she quickly fled the scene. She called Sean to tell him his family was planning an intervention. His brother Ryan called Sean and Sean expressed his anger for his family lying to them. He was later convinced to attend the intervention. Sean agreed to go to treatment if Jules allowed it. Though she initially resisted, she allowed him to go to treatment. Sean completed treatment and returned to Jules. Jules declined an offer to treatment, but did stop drinking around Sean. Sean and his father did not discuss the affair allegations since the intervention. He has been sober since November 14, 2012.
194	21	"Andrew"	bulimia	February 4, 2013
Epilogue: It was revealed during the filming that Andrew actually submitted himself to the show and then lied to the producers about who was doing the submitting. Since Andrew knew about the intervention, the interventionist Seth was going to cancel it. However, because of the severity of Andrew's condition, he decided to continue with the intervention and confront Andrew the day before the actual intervention. Andrew flees from the scene when he is confronted by his mother. His family later comes out and reads their letters, and Andrew insists he talk to his mother alone, where he proceeds to berate her. Seth later is able to convince Andrew to go to treatment. After 70 days in treatment, Andrew's attitude has improved greatly and has forgiven his father for the past. He transferred to a sober living facility and plans to re-enlist in the military. He has not binged or purged since September 22, 2012.

=== Season 14 (2013–14) ===
No. overall	No. in season	Subject(s)	Addiction topic(s)	Original release date
195	1	"Jessica"	alcoholism, heroin	June 13, 2013
196	2	"Dana"	cocaine, prescription drug abuse	June 20, 2013
197	3	"Ryan"	heroin, benzodiazepines	June 27, 2013
Epilogue: Ryan walked out of the intervention, but later agreed to go when his mother Connie said she was going to treatment for her addiction to prescription pain pills. Ryan completed four months of treatment and returned home. He later transferred to a sober living facility in Arizona, but was kicked out for testing positive for marijuana. His parents did not allow him to continue living with them. Connie relapsed once since completing treatment but has not abused her pain medication since December 2012.
198	4	"Gina / Kaila"	heroin / anorexia	July 11, 2013
Epilogue: Gina completed treatment and moved into a sober living facility in Florida. Her son continues to live with her mother. When Kaila arrived at treatment, her family was informed that she had about 2 days to live in her current condition. Despite the severity of her condition, Kaila left treatment after 12 weeks. Her parents attended the Betty Ford program and held their bottom lines. Kaila moved in with her grandmother in Los Angeles.
199	5	"Eric"	heroin	July 18, 2013
Epilogue: Three months after Eric goes to treatment, he is visited by his parents and has been sober for eighty-four days and describes his treatment as "a good road." Eric completed his treatment and moved into sober living. He has been sober since December 12, 2012. His father Joe has also been sober since Eric's intervention. Sadly, Eric relapsed and died of an overdose on August 19, 2017. At the end of the episode, several people who have been on Intervention and gotten sober as a result are interviewed, including Eric, talking about how Intervention saved their lives. A title card states that between 2005 and 2012, Intervention filmed 243 interventions. Of those, 238 addicts went to treatment and 156 are sober today. A collage of the people Intervention has helped is also shown.
200	6	"Tammy"	crack cocaine	November 25, 2014
201	7	"Holley"	cocaine, alcohol	November 25, 2014
202	8	"Aimee"	fentanyl	December 2, 2014
203	9	"Andrew"	TBA	December 9, 2014
A man begins to spiral into addiction after his surrogate father figure is killed in a car accident.
204	10	"Candace"	cocaine, opiates	December 16, 2014
Candace was raised by a single mother who struggled with addiction. At age 23, Candace herself is struggling with her addiction of cocaine and opiates.
205	11	"T.J."	cocaine	December 23, 2014
T.J. is a rock star and also a wife and a mother. She is also a struggling addict to crack cocaine.
206	12	"Jessica"	heroin, crack cocaine	December 30, 2014

=== Season 15 (2015) ===
No. overall	No. in season	Subject(s)	Addiction topic(s)	Original release date
207	1	"Travis"	TBA	January 6, 2015
208	2	"Loren"	alcohol	January 6, 2015
209	3	"Wes / Lise"	TBA	January 13, 2015
210	4	"Allisha"	alcohol, opioids	January 13, 2015
211	5	"Ziggi"	alcohol, GHB	January 20, 2015
212	6	"Lyndsay"	oxycodone	January 20, 2015
213	7	"Jamie"	cocaine	January 27, 2015
214	8	"Sarah"	methamphetamine, hydromorphone, cocaine, morphine	January 27, 2015
215	9	"Meghan"	heroin	February 3, 2015
216	10	"Katie"	opioids	February 10, 2015
217	11	"Wesley"	TBA	February 17, 2015
218	12	"David"	TBA	February 24, 2015
219	13	"Cassandra"	TBA	February 24, 2015
220	14	"John"	TBA	March 3, 2015
221	15	"Brad"	TBA	March 3, 2015
222	16	"Katie"	cocaine, heroin	March 22, 2015
223	17	"Mike / Lauren"	TBA	March 29, 2015
224	18	"Samantha C."	heroin	April 5, 2015
225	19	"Zach / Theresa"	heroin, cocaine / alcohol	April 12, 2015
226	20	"Daniel"	methamphetamines, alcohol	April 19, 2015
227	21	"Samantha"	MDMA, heroin, alcohol	April 26, 2015
228	22	"Mindie / Katherine"	methamphetamine	May 3, 2015
229	23	"Bryceton"	alcohol, marijuana	May 10, 2015
230	24	"Matthew / Olivia"	inhalant abuse / heroin, methamphetamine	July 26, 2015
231	25	"Amanda / James"	heroin / methamphetamine	August 2, 2015
232	26	"David S."	alcohol, methamphetamine	August 9, 2015
233	27	"Erin / Joshua"	prescription drugs / heroin	August 16, 2015
234	28	"Carrie E."	TBA	August 23, 2015
235	29	"Justin / Kayne"	prescription drugs	August 30, 2015

=== Season 16 (2016–17) ===
No. overall	No. in season	Subject(s)	Addiction topic(s)	Original release date
236	1	"Kaeleen"	alcohol, opioids	March 6, 2016
237	2	"Sierra"	methamphetamine	March 13, 2016
238	3	"Kacy"	alcohol	March 20, 2016
239	4	"Anne / Digger"	heroin	March 27, 2016
240	5	"Barry"	alcohol	April 3, 2016
241	6	"Karissa"	heroin, opioids	April 10, 2016
UPDATE: Karissa was killed in a hit and run crash in March 2017.
242	7	"Daniel / Robert"	heroin	April 17, 2016
243	8	"Conrad"	oxycodone	April 24, 2016
244	9	"Loren"	alcohol, prescription drugs	May 1, 2016
245	10	"Kent"	alcohol	May 8, 2016
246	11	"Ginjer"	hydromorphone	June 19, 2016
247	12	"Daniel M."	alcohol, opioids	June 26, 2016
248	13	"Alicia D."	heroin, alprazolam	July 10, 2016
249	14	"Brian N."	alcohol	July 17, 2016
250	15	"Jonel"	methamphetamine, buprenorphine	July 24, 2016
251	16	"Robert"	crack cocaine	July 31, 2016
252	17	"Brittany H."	heroin, methamphetamine	August 7, 2016
Epilogue: In a touching video call, father and daughter commit to supporting each other in sobriety and the show ends. Update: Within days of the show's airing, she relapses and dies from an overdose. A month later, her father shares on several websites that he is still sober and wishes the producers would do a follow-up so no other parent would suffer the loss of a child.
253	18	"Megan"	TBA	August 14, 2016
254	19	"Ryan"	TBA	August 21, 2016
255	20	"Sarah"	alcohol	August 28, 2016
256	21	"Jennifer"	anorexia, opioids	November 29, 2016
257	22	"Katie S."	heroin, methamphetamine	November 29, 2016
258	23	"Kathy"	crack cocaine	December 6, 2016
259	24	"Tiffany"	heroin, methamphetamine	December 6, 2016
260	25	"Jordan"	methamphetamine	December 13, 2016
261	26	"Kristie"	alcohol	December 13, 2016
262	27	"Kevin"	methamphetamine	December 20, 2016
263	28	"Sturgill J."	heroin, prescription drugs	December 20, 2016
264	29	"Robby"	alcohol	December 27, 2016
265	30	"Jasmine"	fentanyl, heroin	January 3, 2017
266	31	"Diana"	alcohol	January 17, 2017
267	32	"Todd"	methamphetamine, prescription drugs	January 24, 2017
268	33	"Robert"	opioids, heroin	January 31, 2017

=== Season 17 (2017) ===
No. overall	No. in season	Subject(s)	Addiction topic(s)	Original release date
269	1	"Katherine C."	heroin, eating disorder	July 17, 2017
Featured Song: Sanctuary by The Wealthy West
270	2	"Tanisha"	heroin	August 17, 2017
271	3	"Joshua B."	hand sanitizer	August 14, 2017
272	4	"Clint"	opiates, methamphetamine	August 21, 2017
273	5	"Melissa"	fentanyl, crack cocaine	August 28, 2017
274	6	"Austin"	opiates	September 11, 2017
275	7	"Alex"	alcohol	September 11, 2017
276	8	"Samantha"	methamphetamine, heroin	September 18, 2017
Samantha quit using drugs in order to raise her two daughters, but her past caught up with her and she began using, again. She lost custody of her daughters as she became addicted to fentanyl. Her family is desperate to save her and they hold an intervention so that Samantha can be a good mother to her daughters.

=== Season 18 (2018) ===
No. overall	No. in season	Subject(s)	Addiction topic(s)	Original release date
277	1	"The Heroin Triangle: Chapter #1"	heroin, crystal meth, crack cocaine, opiates	January 2, 2018
Rather than profile addicts in various locations, this season documented the opioid crisis in the Heroin Triangle, a suburban community on the outskirts of Atlanta, Georgia. The season followed several addicts, interventionists, and law enforcement officials. Subjects including Tiffany and Billy, husband-and-wife heroin addicts who live in their car; Tracey, Tiffany's younger brother who is also a heroin addict and homeless; Zac, an aspiring musician addicted to heroin; Angela, a former heroin addict attempting to stay clean; David and Kiersten, a young, heroin-addicted couple living with David’s mother; Taylor, a heroin addict who works as a stripper; Toni, a heroin and crack addict who works as a prostitute; and Allan, a 55-year-old crack addict who lives with Toni. Throughout the nine episodes the series crosscut between the various subjects and their battles with addiction while also highlighting the state's attempts at battling the drug crisis.
278	2	"The Heroin Triangle: Chapter #2"	heroin, crystal meth, crack cocaine, opiates	January 9, 2018
279	3	"The Heroin Triangle: Chapter #3"	heroin, crystal meth, crack cocaine, opiates	January 16, 2018
280	4	"The Heroin Triangle: Chapter #4"	heroin, crystal meth, crack cocaine, opiates	January 23, 2018
281	5	"The Heroin Triangle: Chapter #5"	heroin, crystal meth, crack cocaine, opiates	January 30, 2018
282	6	"The Heroin Triangle: Chapter #6"	heroin, crystal meth, crack cocaine, opiates	February 6, 2018
283	7	"The Heroin Triangle: Chapter #7"	heroin, crystal meth, crack cocaine, opiates	February 13, 2018
284	8	"The Heroin Triangle: Chapter #8"	heroin, crystal meth, crack cocaine, opiates	February 20, 2018
285	9	"The Heroin Triangle: Chapter #9"	heroin, crystal meth, crack cocaine, opiates	February 27, 2018
In the season finale, a number of updates were given on the featured addicts. Tiffany and Billy both went to treatment and were interviewed sober; Tracey went to treatment and was interviewed sober; Zac refused treatment; Angela said she had remained sober; David and Kiersten both went to treatment and eventually broke up; Toni went to treatment, left treatment and then returned; Allan went to treatment and was interviewed sober; and Taylor Bittler died in January 2018 after filming had ended.

=== Season 19 (2018–19) ===
No. overall	No. in season	Subject(s)	Addiction topic(s)	Original release date
286	1	"Sam & Brad K."	heroin	June 5, 2018
287	2	"Jackie R."	alcohol	June 12, 2018
288	3	"Abbie"	alcohol	June 19, 2018
289	4	"Shiann G."	methamphetamine	June 26, 2018
290	5	"Jade"	opioids, cocaine	July 3, 2018
291	6	"Addicted Moms: Mallory and Sandra"	heroin, methamphetamine,	May 7, 2019
292	7	"Family of Addicts: Tom and John"	heroin, methamphetamine, MDMA	May 14, 2019
293	8	"Young & Addicted: Morgan and Brett"	heroin, methamphetamine	May 21, 2019

=== Season 20 (2019) ===
No. overall	No. in season	Subject(s)	Addiction topic(s)	Original release date
294	1	"The Heroin Hub: Chapter #1"	heroin	August 6, 2019
295	2	"The Heroin Hub: Chapter #2"	heroin	August 13, 2019
296	3	"The Heroin Hub: Chapter #3"	heroin	August 20, 2019
297	4	"The Heroin Hub: Chapter #4"	heroin	August 27, 2019
298	5	"The Heroin Hub: Chapter #5"	heroin	September 3, 2019
Ken Seeley meets with the family of E.J., a 31-year-old heroin addict on the verge of homelessness; Nicole and Janine give updates on their sobriety while in treatment; Interventionist Heather Hayes leads an intervention on Amanda.
299	6	"The Heroin Hub: Chapter #6"	heroin	September 10, 2019
The series concludes with updates on all the participants. Janine relapsed after completing 60-day treatment, but returned to a program; Nicole received dental surgery and completed treatment; Bill and Alana both completed treatment and separated as a couple; Amanda left treatment and is currently on the streets on Philadelphia; and E.J. completed treatment.

=== Season 21 (2020) ===
No. overall	No. in season	Subject(s)	Addiction topic(s)	Original release date
300	1	"Melanie"	crack cocaine	July 20, 2020
301	2	"Robin"	alcohol	July 27, 2020
302	3	"Chelan"	opioids	August 3, 2020
303	4	"Nathan"	opioids	August 10, 2020
304	5	"Courtney"	opioids, methamphetamine	August 17, 2020
305	6	"Coleman"	fentanyl	August 24, 2020
306	7	"Shandon"	opioids	August 31, 2020
307	8	"Natasha"	heroin, methamphetamine	September 14, 2020

=== Season 22 (2021) ===
No. overall	No. in season	Subject(s)	Addiction topic(s)	Original release date
308	1	"Susan"	heroin	March 15, 2021
309	2	"Tristan"	alcohol	March 22, 2021
310	3	"Amanda"	alcohol, methamphetamine	March 29, 2021
311	4	"Michael"	methamphetamine	April 5, 2021
312	5	"Erika"	alprazolam, heroin	April 12, 2021
313	6	"Lexi"	heroin, methamphetamine	April 19, 2021
314	7	"Jake"	alcohol	April 26, 2021
315	8	"Amber"	alcohol, cocaine, morphine	April 26, 2021
316	9	"Mike"	opioids	May 3, 2021
317	10	"Elizabeth"	cocaine, fentanyl	May 10, 2021
318	11	"Tim"	alcohol, methamphetamine	May 17, 2021
319	12	"Dan"	alcohol	May 24, 2021
320	13	"Pamela"	alcohol, methamphetamine	June 7, 2021
321	14	"Kelsey"	alcohol, methamphetamine	June 14, 2021
322	15	"Nicholette"	cocaine	June 21, 2021
323	16	"Caitlin"	crack cocaine	July 5, 2021
324	17	"Travis"	crack cocaine	July 5, 2021
325	18	"Clayton"	heroin	July 12, 2021
326	19	"Elann"	alcohol, methamphetamine	July 12, 2021
327	20	"Maria-Rev"	alcohol	September 27, 2021

=== Season 23 (2021) ===
No. overall	No. in season	Subject(s)	Addiction topic(s)	Original release date
328	1	"Krystal"	heroin, methamphetamine, alcohol, fentanyl	October 18, 2021
329	2	"Peter"	fentanyl	October 25, 2021
330	3	"Jesse"	fentanyl	November 1, 2021
331	4	"Ashley"	methamphetamine, heroin	November 8, 2021
332	5	"Jayden"	fentanyl	November 15, 2021
333	6	"Elliot"	alcohol, heroin	November 22, 2021
334	7	"Ryan"	fentanyl	November 29, 2021
335	8	"Brea"	alcohol	December 6, 2021

=== Season 24 (2022) ===
No. overall	No. in season	Subject(s)	Addiction topic(s)	Original release date
336	1	"Kenny"	fentanyl	June 13, 2022
337	2	"Fentanyl Family Part 1: Christine & Chantel"	fentanyl	June 20, 2022
338	3	"Fentanyl Family Part 2: Christine & Chantel"	fentanyl	June 27, 2022
339	4	"Sarah"	fentanyl, methamphetamine	July 11, 2022
340	5	"Jordan"	alcohol	July 18, 2022
341	6	"Tina Featuring Amber Rose"	fentanyl, crack cocaine	July 25, 2022

=== Season 25 (2024) ===
No. overall	No. in season	Subject(s)	Addiction topic(s)	Original release date
342	1	"Nick and Emily"	carfentanil, crack cocaine	April 22, 2024
343	2	"Three Brothers"	fentanyl, methamphetamine, crack cocaine	April 29, 2024
344	3	"Jessica"	fentanyl, methamphetamine	May 6, 2024
345	4	"Melissa"	cocaine, alcohol	June 10, 2024
346	5	"Tim & Jessica"	fentanyl, crack cocaine, alcohol	June 17, 2024
347	6	"Shannon"	opioids, crack cocaine	June 17, 2024
348	7	"Gabby & Patryk"	fentanyl, crack cocaine, heroin	June 24, 2024
349	8	"Greg"	fentanyl, methamphetamine	June 24, 2024
350	9	"Joey & Erika"	methamphetamine	July 1, 2024
351	10	"Josh"	crack cocaine	July 1, 2024
352	11	"Tommy & Melly"	fentanyl, methamphetamine	July 8, 2024
353	12	"Cassandra & Steven"	crack cocaine, heroin, fentanyl	July 15, 2024
354	13	"Garrett & Shantell"	fentanyl, methamphetamine	July 22, 2024
355	14	"Carlee & Cody"	crack cocaine	July 29, 2024
356	15	"Corinne & Joey"	fentanyl, methamphetamine	August 5, 2024
357	16	"Danielle"	fentanyl	August 12, 2024
358	17	"Cody & Erin"	fentanyl, methamphetamine	August 19, 2024
359	18	"Tristan"	alcohol	August 26, 2024
