= Jeff VanVonderen =

American author

- Born: October 2, 1952 (age 74); Coleman, Wisconsin, U.S.
- Occupations: Author; interventionist
- Website: www.jeffvanvonderen.com & www.spiritualabuse.com

Jeff VanVonderen (born October 2, 1952) is an American author, motivational speaker, former pastor, and interventionist who is best known for his appearances on A&E reality show Intervention. VanVonderen wrote seven books on various topics such as family troubles, drug addiction, and spirituality.

== Author ==
VanVonderen's first book - originally published in the 1980s, re-released in 2004, is a work called Good News for the Chemically Dependent and Those Who Love Them. The book touched on the theme of addiction. VanVonderen's second book, published in 1990, entitled Tired of Trying to Measure Up: Getting free from the demands, expectations, and intimidation of well-meaning people, explored the implications of shame, and sought to guide Christians towards making choices more freely. Three years later he authored Families Where Grace is in Place. The Subtle Power of Spiritual Abuse, written by VanVonderen and David Johnson in 1991, offered advice concerning spiritual abuse. It was followed up by a book that sought to explore recovery from the more interpersonal hurts suffered in dysfunctional church systems, "When God's People Let you Down."

VanVonderen has completed his next installment entitled Soul Repair: Rebuilding Your Spiritual Life. The book was released on October 1, 2008. "Hope and Help for the Addicted" came out in 2011.

== Interventionist ==
He is a Certified Intervention Professional.

He was also a regular fixture on A&E's Emmy-winning Intervention during the 14 seasons of the show, in which his demeanor remained largely unchanged. The show rotated between four licensed interventionists and won an Emmy Award for Best Reality Show. He has held thousands of interventions to help individuals fight life-threatening addictions. He advises each family on how to cope and unite in recovery and treatment processes. In 2008, in one of the episodes of "Intervention" on A&E, VanVonderen admitted to having a brief alcohol relapse. He has since sought help. He is quoted as saying "Individuals and families become dysfunctional by accident. But they get well on purpose and this is what I'm about, helping them do that."

== Popular culture ==
VanVonderen is mentioned in the 2013 Eminem track "The Monster (feat. Rihanna)" in the lyric "I think you've been wandering off down yonder/And stumbled onto Jeff VanVonderen/Cause I need an interventionist/To intervene between me and this monster".
