= Candy Finnigan =

American professional interventionist (born 1946)

Heather Candace "Candy" Finnigan (born May 18, 1946) is a professional interventionist who appeared regularly on the A&E show Intervention. She received her Certification in Chemical Dependency from UCLA and interned at Cedars-Sinai Hospital.

A recovering alcoholic for 39 years, Candy Finnigan wrote When Enough is Enough: A Comprehensive Guide to Successful Intervention, "a tell-it-like-it-is guide to the process of intervention; a must read if you're interested in conducting an intervention." She is a graduate of University of Kansas and was married to Mike Finnigan, a musician and former basketball player for 51 years, until his death in 2021. She and her late husband Mike have two children: daughter, Bridget, and son, Kelly.

Finnigan is a Board Registered Interventionist (Level) II.
