= Amber Rose =

American model and television personality (born 1983)

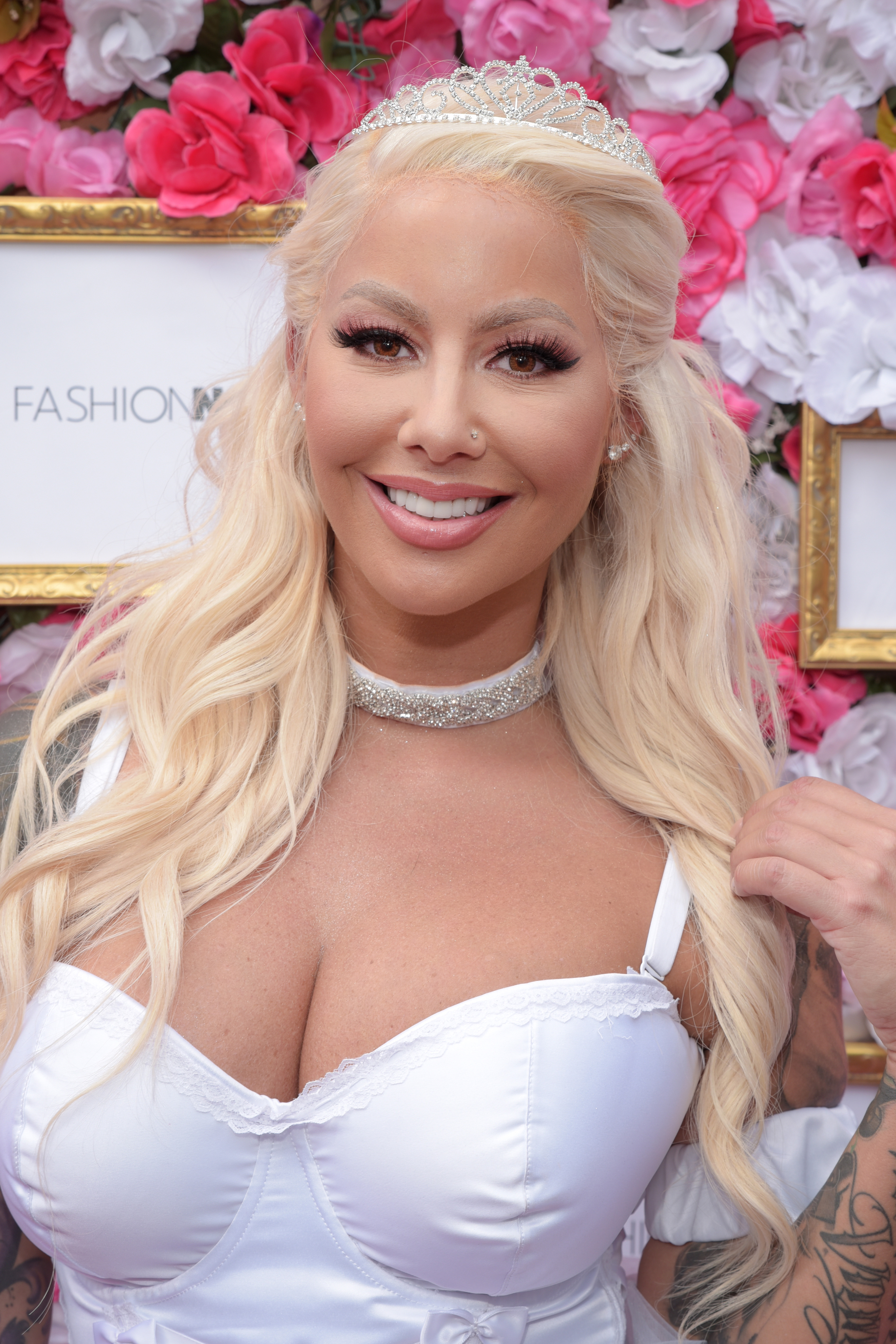
- Rose at the 2018 SlutWalk
- Born: Amber Rose Levonchuck; October 21, 1983 (age 43); Philadelphia, Pennsylvania, U.S.
- Occupations: Television personality; model; actress
- Years active: 2007–present
- Spouse: Wiz Khalifa (m. 2013; div. 2016)
- Partner: Alexander 'A.E' Edwards (2018–2021)
- Children: 2

Amber Rose Levonchuck (born October 21, 1983) is an American model and television personality. She gained attention after she starred in the music video for Young Jeezy's 2008 single "Put On", which featured Kanye West. She began a romantic relationship with West, leading her to model for the Louis Vuitton brand; she then signed a modeling contract with Ford Models. She earned wider recognition as a video vixen in more hip hop videos. After splitting from West in 2010, she dated and in 2013 married rapper Wiz Khalifa, but filed for divorce in 2014. Simon & Schuster then published her book How to Be a Bad Bitch. In 2015 she founded the Los Angeles chapter of the SlutWalk protest march, an annual feminist demonstration founded in Toronto. The next year she hosted her own talk show, The Amber Rose Show, for VH1, and began hosting the syndicated radio call-in program Loveline.

== Early life ==
Amber Rose Levonchuck was born in Philadelphia on October 21, 1983 to Dorothy Rose, who was 23 at the time, and Michael Levonchuck who was 19. Her father is of Irish and Italian descent and her mother is of Cape Verdean descent. She has one brother named Antonio Hewlett. Rose grew up in South Philadelphia.

Rose began stripping at the age of 15 under the pseudonym "Paris" to provide for her family after her mother's separation from her stepfather, an alcoholic. On the podcasts The Red Pill and Club Shay Shay, she stated that she had previously attempted to sell crack cocaine, but quit after finding it too risky.

== Career ==
Rose's appearance in the music video for Young Jeezy's 2008 single "Put On" caught the attention of Kanye West, who guest performed on the song and video. Rose then gained wider exposure after posing for a Louis Vuitton print advertisement featuring West's sneaker line. She walked the runway at New York Fashion Week for "Celestino", and later made cameos in music videos including Ludacris's "What Them Girls Like", Nicki Minaj's "Massive Attack", Young Jeezy's "Vacation", Wiz Khalifa's "No Sleep" and Fabolous's "You Be Killin' Em". She was signed with modeling agency Ford Models from 2009 to 2010.

In 2010, she appeared in Russell Simmons's reality show about his two assistants, Running Russell Simmons. She also starred in a PSA by NOH8 Campaign. In 2011, Rose was a guest judge on Season 3 of RuPaul's Drag Race. She was also a judge on Season 2 of Master of the Mix. In November 2011, she became the spokesperson for Smirnoff and appeared in television ads and billboards for the company's new flavors Whipped Cream and Fluffed Marshmallow.

On August 30, 2016, Rose was announced as one of the celebrities who would compete on the 23rd season of Dancing with the Stars. She was partnered with professional dancer Maksim Chmerkovskiy. They were eliminated on October 17 and finished in ninth place.

=== Musical pursuits ===
Rose released her debut single "Fame", which featured her then-fiancé Wiz Khalifa, on January 10, 2012, followed by a second single, titled "Loaded", the following month. She then rapped on the eleventh track of Khalifa's O.N.I.F.C., titled "Rise Above", along with rappers Tuki Carter and Pharrell Williams, the latter of whom produced the song. She was managed by Leticia "Tish" Cyrus, the mother of singer Miley Cyrus, who was Rose's and Khalifa's close friend.

=== Business endeavors ===
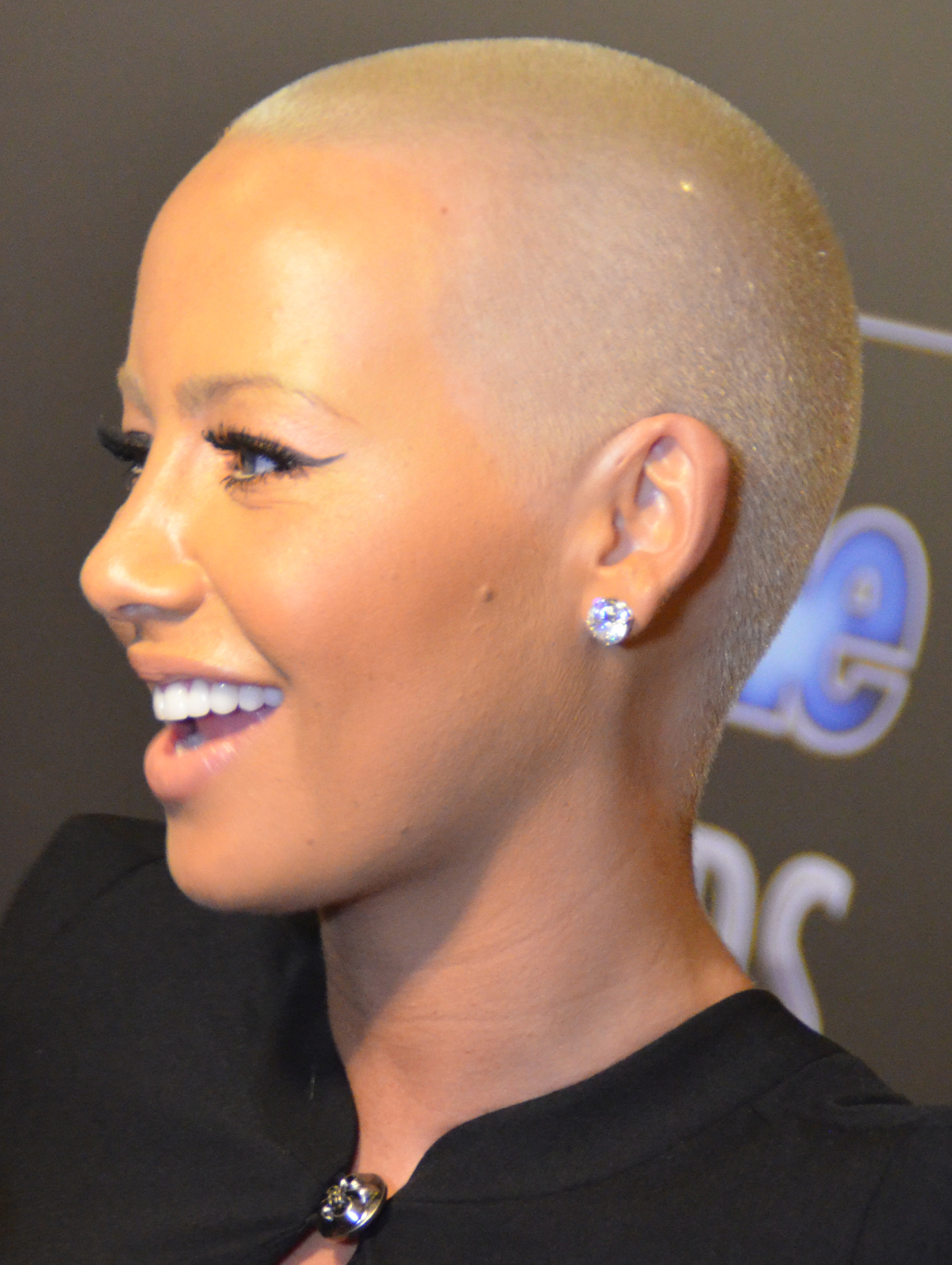
Rose at the People awards in 2014

In September 2009, Rose announced plans to launch her own eyewear line. In 2012, Rose opened a clothing line with her friend Priscilla Ono called Rose & Ono. Rose guest-starred on an episode of Wild 'N Out on MTV2, and had a role as "MaryWanna" in the film School Dance, which was directed by her then-manager, Nick Cannon in 2014. Simon & Schuster published her first book, How to Be a Bad Bitch, in which she offers advice and personal anecdotes on everything from finances and career to love and fashion. The cover features an image shot by famed photographer David LaChapelle.

In 2015, Rose filmed "Walk of No Shame with Amber Rose" with Funny or Die. The viral video helped promote Rose's SlutWalk, which took place on October 3, 2015, in Los Angeles, California. In March 2016, Rose launched an emoji app called MuvaMoji, featuring 900 emoji icons which she curated. In May 2016, it was announced that Rose would star in her own talk show titled The Amber Rose Show on VH1, which debuted on July 8, 2016. On September 8, 2016, Rose began hosting Loveline.

== Personal life ==
In 2020, Rose started selling pictures on OnlyFans. She said she wanted to do it earlier but was delayed because of her pregnancy. In October 2024, Rose earned $1,122,037 on OnlyFans and remains one of the highest paid creators on the platform.

She has publicly identified as an atheist.

=== Relationships ===
Rose dated rapper Kanye West for two years, starting in 2008.

In 2013, she married rapper Wiz Khalifa and the two had a son together. Rose, Khalifa, and their son divided their time between homes in Los Angeles and Canonsburg, Pennsylvania. Rose filed for divorce from Khalifa on September 22, 2014, citing irreconcilable differences and planned to take full custody of their son. As of 2015, Rose and Khalifa have joint custody of their son.

She briefly dated Machine Gun Kelly in 2015. In 2016, Rose dated NBA player Terrence Ross.

Beginning in summer 2017, Rose was dating 21 Savage. As of March 2018, the couple was separated.

In 2009, in regard to her sexual orientation, Rose stated, "I'm extremely open with my sexuality. I can be in love with a woman, I can be in love with a man. As far as humans go, I definitely find beauty in everybody, whether they're heavy-set, super-skinny, if they're white, black, Indian, Asian, Spanish. I can see beauty in anybody. If I see a woman and I think she's beautiful and I like her, and she likes me back we can definitely try to be in a relationship together." In 2016, Rose told guest Margaret Cho during an episode of her podcast Love Line with Amber Rose that she once dated a trans man.

On April 3, 2019, Rose announced on Instagram that she was expecting her second child with Def Jam executive Alexander "A.E." Edwards. In October 2019, Rose gave birth to a son.

=== SlutWalk ===
In October 2015, Rose led the Los Angeles-based SlutWalk to honor all women who have been judged and demeaned for their sexual behavior. As part of the event, she spoke publicly about the instances of shaming she has experienced, specifically mentioning an incident at the age of 14, when a male classmate pulled his genitals out while in a closet with her playing the kissing game "seven minutes in heaven". Rose related that he tricked her into kneeling down in front of him, then threw open the closet door for all of their friends to see, suggesting oral sex had taken place. Rose grew visibly agitated while speaking about the bullying that followed, demonstrating for her audience the depth of the trauma the experience caused. Rose has since been associated with the event annually.

=== Political views ===
When asked about Donald Trump in August 2016, Rose stated, "He's just such an idiot. He's so weird. I really hope he's not president." In May 2024, Rose announced her support for Trump in the 2024 United States presidential election, formally endorsing him during a speech at the 2024 Republican National Convention in July.

== Filmography ==
Year	Title	Role	Notes
2007	A Haunting	Jessie	1 episode
2008	Better Off Alone	Jennifer	Short film
2010	The Hills	Herself	
2011	RuPaul's Drag Race	Herself	Guest judge
2011–12	Master of the Mix	Herself	Judge
2012	Gang of Roses II: Next Generation	Tara X	Film
2014	School Dance	MaryWanna	Film
2014	Selfie	Fit Brit	TV series
2014	Wild 'n Out	Herself	1 episode
2015	Sister Code	Lexi	Film
2015	Black-ish	Dominique	1 episode
2016	Hollywood Medium with Tyler Henry	Herself	TV series
2016	What Happened Last Night	Melanie	Film
2016	The Eric Andre Show	Herself	TV series
2016	The Amber Rose Show	Herself	
2016	Dancing with the Stars	Herself/Contestant	Season 23
2017	America's Next Top Model	Herself/Guest	Season 23
2019	Hell's Kitchen	Herself/Guest diner	Episode: "What's Your Motto?"
2022	Good Mourning	Weed girl	
2022	Intervention	Herself	Season 24
2023	College Hill: Celebrity Edition	Herself	8 episodes
2025	Baddies Africa	Herself	
