= The Amber Rose Show =

- Genre: Talk show
- Presented by: Amber Rose
- Country of origin: United States
- Original language: English
- No. of seasons: 1
- No. of episodes: 9

Production
- Executive producers: Jay McGraw; Phil McGraw; Carla Pennington; Patty Ciano; Jeff Hudson; Amber Rose; Walter Mosley; Nina L. Diaz; Trevor Rose
- Production companies: Stage 29 Productions; Behind Her Shades Entertainment

Original release
- Network: VH1
- Release: July 8 – September 26, 2016

The Amber Rose Show is an American talk show starring Amber Rose that premiered on July 8, 2016, on VH1. Announced on May 3, 2016, the weekly series features Rose interviewing celebrity guests about various topics related to pop culture, motherhood, and relationships. The show was initially scheduled to premiere on June 17, 2016, but it was later announced it would premiere three weeks later.

"I'm really unapologetic, and I don't give a f--k. I say what I feel so I needed a home like VH1 to not censor myself," Rose describes the show.

The show was not renewed for a second season.

== Episodes ==
No.	Title	Original release date	US viewers (millions)
1	"Episode 1"	July 8, 2016	0.34
French Montana is interviewed.
2	"Episode 2"	July 15, 2016	0.28
T.I. is interviewed.
3	"Episode 3"	July 22, 2016	0.34
The Game is interviewed.
4	"Episode 4"	July 29, 2016	0.22
Tyson Beckford and EJ Johnson are interviewed.
5	"Episode 5"	August 5, 2016	0.20
Marlon Wayans and Kandi Burruss are interviewed.
6	"Episode 6"	August 12, 2016	0.25
O.T. Genasis is interviewed.
7	"Episode 7"	August 19, 2016	0.23
Nick Cannon is interviewed.
8	"Episode 8"	August 26, 2016	0.28
Ty Dolla Sign, Timothy DeLaGhetto, Nicole Byer and Sarah Colonna are interviewed.
9	"SlutWalk Special"	September 26, 2016	0.49
Angel Brinks, Jessica White and Tori Brixx are interviewed.
