= Ken Seeley =

Interventionist and author

- Seeley, 2009
- Born: October 25, 1962 (age 63)
- Occupation(s): Interventionist, author
- Partner: Eric McLaughlin
- Website: https://intervention911.com

Kenneth Raymond Seeley (born October 25, 1962) is an interventionist and author. He is best known for appearing on the A&E reality show, Intervention. Certified as a CIP, CCMI-M, RAS, CATC, Seeley has been sober since July 14, 1989. Since then, he has worked full-time in the business of recovery.

== Career ==
Seeley is the author of Face It and Fix It, published by HarperOne in 2009.

Seeley has remained professionally and personally involved in recovery since 1989. In an early episode of Intervention, he revealed he was once addicted to crystal meth. He became sober on July 14, 1989. He is a Certified Intervention Professional, Master's Level Case Manager / Interventionist, Registered Addiction Specialist, and Certified Addiction Treatment Counselor.

Seeley is a regular contributor to CNN, MSNBC, NBC, CBS, Fox, and ABC on the topic of addiction. Seeley was one of three featured interventionists on the Emmy Award Winning Television Series Intervention on A&E.

== Honors ==
In 2011, a Golden Palm Star on the Palm Springs, California, Walk of Stars was dedicated to him.

== Personal life ==
Seeley resides in California with his partner, Eric McLaughlin.

== See also ==
- Drug rehabilitation
- Sober Coach
- Sober living environment
