= Community reinforcement approach and family training =

Behavior therapy approach

Community Reinforcement and Family Training (CRAFT) is a behavioural interventional approach used in the treatment of substance use disorders. CRAFT aims to improve communication and interaction patterns as well as support engagement with treatment services by working with family members of individuals diagnosed with substance use disorders.

== Overview ==
Developed in the late 1970s by Dr. Robert J. Meyers and colleagues, CRAFT is an adaptation of the Community Reinforcement Approach (CRA). Whereas CRA works with individuals with substance abuse disorders, CRAFT works with the family of an individual with a substance use disorder to encourage them to seek treatment.

CRAFT has three primary goals:

1. Engage the substance user in treatment.
2. Reduce substance use behaviours.
3. Improve the family members' mood and functioning.

CRAFT treatment is time-limited.

The adolescent community reinforcement approach (A-CRA) specifically adapts CRA for adolescents with substance use issues and their caregivers.

== Research and outcomes ==
In a study sponsored by the National Institute on Drug Abuse, family members receiving CRAFT successfully engaged 74 percent of initially unmotivated drug users in treatment.

One study compared the two psychotherapy approaches of CRAFT and twelve-step facilitation therapies (TFT) — not to be confused with the 12-Step programs, such as Al-Anon, since TFT is a time-limited program intended to "simulate the type of support and guidance... traditionally receive[d] from attending Al-Anon meetings" — for their impacts on addicts seeking to enter treatment. The finding was that concerned significant others who participated in facilitation therapy engaged 29.0% of addicts into treatment, whereas those who went through CRAFT engaged 67.2%. Another study compared CRAFT, Al-Anon facilitation therapy, and the Johnson intervention. The study found that all of these approaches were associated with similar improvements in the functioning of concerned significant others and improvements in their relationship quality with the addicts. However, the CRAFT approach was more effective in engaging initially unmotivated problem drinkers in treatment (64%) as compared with the facilitation therapy (13%) and Johnson interventions (30%).

== See also ==
- Al-Anon/Alateen
- American Psychological Association
- Behaviourism
- Clinical behavior analysis
- Cognitive behavioral therapy
- Communal reinforcement
- Domestic violence
- Intervention (counseling)
- National Institute on Alcohol Abuse and Alcoholism
- National Institute on Drug Abuse
- SMART Recovery
