= Adolescent community reinforcement approach =

The adolescent community reinforcement approach (A-CRA) is a behavioral treatment for alcohol and other substance use disorders that helps youth, young adults, and families improve access to interpersonal and environmental reinforcers to reduce or stop substance use.

== Description ==
A-CRA is a variant of the adult CRA model, which has a history of development and effectiveness research starting in the 1970s. A-CRA was adapted to be developmentally appropriate for adolescents, which included adding sessions for parents/caregivers. The goal of A-CRA is to improve or increase access to social, familial, and educational/vocational reinforcers for adolescents to achieve and sustain recovery. That is, therapists assist adolescents with learning how to lead an enjoyable and healthy life without using alcohol or other drugs. The treatment manual describes an outpatient curriculum that is intended for adolescents (ages 12 to 17) and young adults (ages 18–25). with DSM-5 alcohol and/or other substance use disorders. A-CRA also has been implemented in intensive outpatient and residential treatment settings. A-CRA includes three types of clinical sessions: adolescent alone, parents/caregivers alone, and family (adolescent with parents/caregivers). To address the adolescent's needs, goals for treatment, and reinforcers, clinicians select from 19 A-CRA procedures (e.g., communication skills, problem-solving, and participation in positive social activities), all with the goal of improving life areas and supporting abstinence from alcohol and other drugs. Practicing skills during sessions is an important aspect of A-CRA counseling, and every clinical session ends with a homework assignment (mutually-agreed upon by adolescent and clinician) to apply skills learned during the session. Clinicians practicing A-CRA are trained in all 19 procedures and complete an extensive certification process. A-CRA has been widely implemented in the U.S., Canada, and Brazil.

== Evidence-based outcomes ==
As of 2017, five randomized clinical trials of A-CRA have been published. The Cannabis Youth Treatment (CYT) study, which was funded by the Substance Abuse and Mental Health Services Administration's (SAMHSA's) Center for Substance Abuse Treatment (CSAT), was a randomized controlled study of five manual-guided treatment models for adolescents with cannabis-related disorders. All five models demonstrated significant pre-post treatment improvements in number of days abstinent and the percent of adolescents in recovery during the 12-month follow-up period. Within its study arm, A-CRA was the most cost-effective model; across both study arms, A-CRA was the most cost-effective model to involve parents in treatment. Additional randomized clinical trials have shown A-CRA to be effective for homeless, street-living youth and young adults, youth with juvenile justice involvement, and as a continuing care approach for adolescents after residential treatment. Secondary evaluation studies suggest that A-CRA shows potential to be an effective treatment for adolescents with co-occurring psychiatric disorders and youth with opioid use problems.

== Treatment cost ==
In a 2002 article assessing the economic costs of A-CRA, the average cost per completed treatment event was $1,237 at one site and $1,608 at another site. Using U.S. Bureau of Labor Statistics data to adjust for inflation, the 2017 cost per A-CRA treatment episode ranges from $1,683 to $2,188.

== Treatment manual ==
The original A-CRA treatment manual was published in 2001. An updated version of the A-CRA manual was published in 2016.

== Therapist fidelity to A-CRA treatment manual ==
Although therapist fidelity to an evidence-based treatment manual is believed to predict treatment outcome, this relationship has been difficult to prove. A 2017 study found that higher ongoing fidelity (model competence) ratings of 91 A-CRA therapists' clinical sessions predicted improved adolescent substance use outcomes. This finding suggests that the A-CRA model of clinical certification and supervision, which rates A-CRA counseling sessions using a standardized rubric, is a central part of model effectiveness.

== See also ==
- Behavior therapy
- Behaviorism
- Cognitive behavioral therapy
- Community reinforcement and family training
- Drug rehabilitation
- Mental health disorders
- Opioid use disorder
