= Intervention (TV series) =

American documentary television series

- Genre: Documentary; Reality
- Created by: Sam Mettler
- Starring: Jeff VanVonderen; Candy Finnigan; Others; see Interventionists
- Theme music composer: Craig Marks
- Ending theme: "Five Steps" by The Davenports (composed by Scott Klass)
- Composers: Craig Marks (2005–2013); Dominic Messenger (incidental, 2006–2007)
- Country of origin: United States
- Original language: English
- No. of seasons: 25
- No. of episodes: 355 (list of episodes)

Production
- Executive producers: Gary R. Benz; Michael Branton
- Production location: United States
- Camera setup: Multi-camera; Handheld HDV cameras
- Running time: 43 minutes
- Production company: GRB Entertainment

Original release
- Network: A&E
- Release: March 6, 2005 – August 26, 2024

Intervention is an American documentary television series that premiered on A&E on March 6, 2005. Each episode profiles one or two people struggling with drug or alcohol addiction, recording their daily lives in the days before a surprise intervention organized by family and friends. The intervention ends with an ultimatum: enter an inpatient drug rehabilitation program or lose contact, financial support, or other help from loved ones. The 25th season premiered on April 22, 2024.

== Overview ==
The show follows one or two participants who have either substance dependence or addiction, and occasionally, eating disorders. It is a documentary of their addiction, including graphic substance abuse and its effect upon their lives, until a surprise intervention event is conducted with a professional interventionist. It is intercut with interviews with relatives and friends. In the intervention, the addict is given an ultimatum: either undergo a 90-day, fully covered treatment plan at a rehabilitation facility or risk losing contact, income or privileges from their relatives and friends.

In situations where the individuals in the addict's close circle have become codependent or otherwise traumatized by the addict's behavior, the interventionist usually recommends that the entire family seek counseling to enable them to move on. Medical detoxification is available when drug withdrawal is dangerous.

== Interventionists ==
The role of the Interventionist on the show is to persuade the addict to consent to the treatment being offered. If the patient agrees to recovery, some of the Interventionists will accompany the addict to the treatment facility or provide a nurse. They will advise each addict on which center they are assigned to based on their addiction, which is typically in a different state than where they reside. Many Interventionists have appeared on the show since its start in 2005.

Ken Seeley is an Interventionist, certified in CCMI-M, CIP, CTP, CADC, CAS. He is a recovering addict himself devoting his life to helping others and has his own recovery treatment facility in Palm Springs, CA. Seeley has made many appearances on the show since 2005. Jeff VanVonderen is a Certified Intervention Professional, also gives motivational speeches across the country, and has been highlighted in several publications. VanVonderen has appeared on several episodes of the show starting in 2005. Candy Finnigan is an Interventionist, Certified Master Addiction Counselor III. and Board Registered Interventionist II. and received several certificates in drug addiction. Finnigan is a recovering addict herself and has written a book called "When Enough is Enough" about how others can offer support for someone with an addiction.

Sylvia Parsons, Interventionist, certified in MS, LCAS, CSAC, QSAP, QMHP with a Master of Science Addiction Counseling. She is a professional therapist with her own counseling facility. Parsons is a recovering addict herself and has been sober from 2006 to the present. Michael Gonzales is an Interventionist and certified CIP, CTP, Cpi., Full Member of AIS. He has dedicated his life to helping families and addicts on healing from addiction. In the past, Gonzales has spent time in jail and recovered from addiction. Heather Hayes is another Interventionist certified in M.Ed., LPC, CIP and a Master's Level, Licensed Counselor. She has been featured on other broadcast networks, public speaking engagements around the world and has written several documents about addiction. Hayes helped many addicts on the 2018 broadcast of the show.

James "Jim" Reidy is an Interventionist who has spent over a decade of his life battling his own addiction. He has devoted his life to helping others in their recovery for addiction, traveling to many states, and working with their support system. Leticia Murphy is in Interventionist, certified in M.A., LMFT, LCADC. She has her own business in Las Vegas, Nevada where she sees clients for various mental health issues. Donna Chavous is an Interventionist, who chose this path after being addicted for many years and seeing others die from it. She started helping addicts on the show in 2010. Vance Johnson is an Interventionist and Recovery Ambassador on the show as well as the states. He is a former athlete and addict that has recovered and is helping others in their healing journey.

== Notable subjects ==
While most episodes feature private individuals, the series has also profiled several public figures.

Notable subjects profiled on Intervention
Name	Background	Season	Episode	Episode subject	Refs.
Vanessa Marquez	Supporting actress, ER	1	2	Compulsive buying disorder	
Travis Meeks	Lead singer, Days of the New	1	5	Methamphetamine addiction	
Antwahn Nance	Former NBA power forward (Los Angeles Clippers); 6 ft 10 in (2.08 m)	2	8	Crack cocaine addiction; homelessness	
Chuckie Negron	Son of Three Dog Night vocalist Chuck Negron	2	10	Heroin addiction	
Tressa Thompson	Shot put champion	4	7	Methamphetamine addiction	
Chad Gerlach	Professional cyclist	5	1	Alcohol and crack cocaine addiction; homelessness	
Aaron Brink	Adult film actor; former mixed martial arts fighter	6	8	Methamphetamine addiction	
Rocky Lockridge	Two-time super featherweight boxing champion (died 2019)	7	13	Drug addiction; homelessness	
Linda Li	Actress; Star Trek: Voyager episode "Favorite Son"	7	1	Actiq (transmucosal fentanyl) addiction	
David Sax Jr.	Son of MLB player Dave Sax; nephew of MLB player Steve Sax	14	16	Methamphetamine and alcohol addiction	
Amber Rose	Model and television personality	24	6	Appeared as friend of subject (childhood friend addicted to fentanyl and crack cocaine)	

== Episodes ==
Season	Episodes	Originally released	
Season	Episodes	First released	Last released
1	14	March 6, 2005	August 21, 2005
2	21	October 30, 2005	December 17, 2006
3	15	March 16, 2007	September 7, 2007
4	10	December 3, 2007	March 17, 2008
5	17	June 23, 2008	November 30, 2008
6	14	December 15, 2008	March 23, 2009
7	17	May 25, 2009	October 19, 2009
8	18	November 23, 2009	May 10, 2010
9	9	June 28, 2010	August 22, 2010
10	13	December 13, 2010	March 21, 2011
11	12	June 20, 2011	September 12, 2011
12	13	January 2, 2012	April 2, 2012
13	21	August 13, 2012	February 4, 2013
14	12	June 13, 2013	December 30, 2014
15	29	January 6, 2015	August 30, 2015
16	33	March 6, 2016	January 3, 2017
17	8	July 31, 2017	September 18, 2017
18	9	January 2, 2018	February 27, 2018
19	8	June 5, 2018	May 21, 2019
20	6	August 6, 2019	September 10, 2019
21	8	July 20, 2020	September 14, 2020
22	20	March 15, 2021	September 27, 2021
23	8	October 18, 2021	December 6, 2021
24	6	June 13, 2022	July 25, 2022
25	18	April 22, 2024	August 26, 2024

== Reception ==
The show received the 2009 Emmy award for Outstanding Reality Program and the 2010 Emmy award for outstanding picture of reality editing.

=== Criticism ===
Matthew Gilbert of The Boston Globe, a critic of the show, argues that the program is exploitative and showcases individuals as they self-destruct. He also argues that the confrontation within the intervention is milked to show only the most dramatic moments and that the final results of the intervention and subsequent rehabilitation are glossed-over.

Melanie McFarland, another television critic, also laments that the show does little to educate on successful intervention and instead deceives the subjects of each episode in order to film them at their lowest point.

== Legacy ==
During early 2011, A&E aired the series Relapse, which ran for five episodes. Each episode focuses on sober coaches' work with long-time addicts who have been unable to get clean after repeated attempts at treatment. Coach Seth Jaffe became an interventionist on the main series.

Several spin-off series were launched. On September 9, 2011, Intervention Canada debuted on Slice Network. On December 28, 2012, Teen Trouble debuted on Lifetime which is executive produced by Bryn Freedman, a former Intervention producer. On March 8, 2016, Intervention: Codependent premiered on LMN.

== In popular culture ==
On April 16, 2010, the video "Best Cry Ever" was posted on YouTube, featuring a clip from Season 7 episode "Rocky". The clip centers around a dramatic scene in which former professional boxer Rocky Lockridge is crying in a distinctive way. It has become an Internet phenomenon. A Saturday Night Live sketch features an Intervention parody with guest host Jon Hamm crying in a similar fashion.

The South Park episode "Crippled Summer" parodied Intervention with the character Towelie.
