= Intervention (counseling) =

Strategy for solving a social problem

An intervention is an orchestrated attempt by one or many people – usually family and friends – to get someone to seek professional help with a substance use disorder or some kind of traumatic event or crisis, or other serious problem. Intervention can also refer to the act of using a similar technique within a therapy session.

Interventions have been used to address serious personal problems, including alcohol use disorder, compulsive gambling, substance use disorder, compulsive eating and other eating disorders, self harm, and being the victim of abuse.

== Direct and indirect interventions ==
Interventions are either direct, typically involving a confrontational meeting with the individual in question, or indirect, involving work with a co-dependent family to encourage them to be more effective in helping the individual.

There are three major models of intervention in use today: the Johnson Model, the Arise Model, and the Systemic Family Model.

The use of interventions originated in the 1960s with Dr. Vernon Johnson. The Johnson Model was subsequently taught years later at the Johnson Institute. It focuses on creating a confrontation between a group of supporters and the addict in order to expose the addict to the consequences of their addiction. The confrontation serves to precipitate a crisis in the addict's life that is not threatening, damaging, or fatal, and is used to compel them into treatment before they are able to suffer irreparable social or physical damage as a result of their disease.

The Arise Intervention Model involves exposing the addict and their family members to a collaborative intervention process. Rather than being confrontational, the Arise Model is invitational, non-secretive, and a gradually-escalating process.

The Systemic Family Model may use either an invitational or confrontational approach. It differs from the Johnson Model in that the focus is on fostering a patient, firm coaching instead of creating a negative confrontation. Rather than focusing on the addict, the interventionist fosters discussion with the entire family on how their behavior contributes to the addicted person's continued use of substances, and how to approach the problem as a family unit.

While some interventionists will gravitate to one of the above models over the others, many are able to blend the three models based on what will be most effective for the addict and their family.

== Plans for direct intervention ==
Plans for an intervention are made by a concerned group of family, friends, and counselor(s), rather than by the person using drugs or alcohol. Whether it is invitation model or direct model, the person using substances is not included in the decision-making process for planning the intervention. A properly conducted direct intervention is planned through cooperation between the identified family or friends of the person using substances and an intervention counselor, coordinator, or educator. It is important to perform the intervention in an open, large space so as to reassure the person using substances that they are not trapped or cornered. Ample time must be given to the specific situation; however, basic guidelines can be followed in the intervention planning process. (An intervention can also be conducted in the workplace with colleagues and with no family present.)

== Prior preparation ==
Prior to the intervention, the family meets with a counselor or interventionist. Families prepare letters in which they describe their experiences associated with the addict person's behavior, to convey to the person the impact his or her addiction has had on others. Also during the intervention rehearsal meeting, a group member is strongly urged to create a list of activities by the addicted person that they will no longer tolerate, finance, or participate in if the addicted person does not agree to check into a rehabilitation center for treatment. These consequences may be as simple as no longer loaning money to the addicted person, but can be far more serious, such as losing custody of a child.

Family and friends read their letters to the addicted person, who then must decide whether to check into the prescribed rehabilitation center or deal with the promised losses.

== Effectiveness ==
There are questions about the long-term effectiveness of interventions for those addicted to drugs or alcohol. A study examining people who were addicted to substances who had undergone a standard intervention (called the Johnson Intervention) found that they had a higher relapse rate than any other method of referral to outpatient Alcohol and Other Drug treatment. "The Johnson Institute intervention entails five therapy sessions that prepare the client and his or her family members for a family confrontation meeting."

One study compared Community Reinforcement Approach and Family Training (CRAFT), Al-Anon facilitation therapy designed to encourage involvement in the 12-step program, and a Johnson intervention and found that all of these approaches were associated with similar improvements in concerned significant other functioning and improvements in their relationship quality with the addicted person. However, the CRAFT approach was more effective in engaging initially unmotivated problem drinkers in treatment (64%) as compared with the Al-Anon (13%) and Johnson interventions (30%).

== In popular culture ==
=== Film and television ===
- The A&E television series Intervention follows participants who have addictions or other mentally or physically damaging problems in anticipation of an intervention by family and friends. Each participant is given a choice: go into rehabilitation immediately or risk losing contact, income, or other privileges from the loved ones who instigated the intervention.
- The Bravo TV reality show Thintervention follows American fitness trainer Jackie Warner as she helps a group of eight clients lose weight. Warner's clients receive psychological, nutritional, and lifestyle counseling in addition to physical fitness training.

=== Literature ===
- Faye Resnick reveals in the book Nicole Brown Simpson: The Private Diary of a Life Interrupted (1994), which she co-wrote with Mike Walker, gossip columnist for The National Enquirer, that she learned about Brown's murder three days after Brown and her friends forced Resnick to enter a rehab clinic for substance use disorders.

== See also ==
- Community Reinforcement Approach and Family Training (CRAFT)
- Drug Interventions Programme
- Duluth Domestic Abuse Intervention Project
- Exit counseling
- List of counseling topics
