= Bikers for Christ =

Christian ministry for motorcyclists

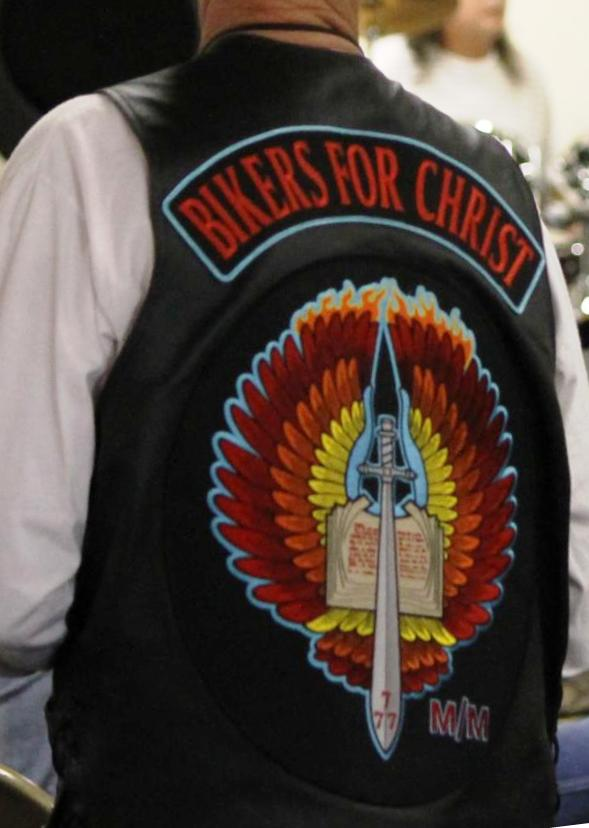
The Bikers for Christ M/M Patch

Bikers For Christ, or BFC is a Christian ministry for motorcyclists founded in 1990 by Pastor Fred Zariczny (A.K.A. "Pastor Z"), who also pastors Rushing Wind Ministries in Oceanside, California. BFC first operated under Calvary Chapel of Marysville, CA in the 1990s. Now it operates under the covering of: Rushing Wind Ministries in Southern California. Rushing Wind Ministries was founded in 2003 as a Biker Church in Oceanside, California by Pastor Z., and there are now over a dozen Rushing Wind affiliate churches in the Us and overseas. There are currently over a hundred BFC chapters with thousands of members worldwide. Paul Crouch Jr. with the Trinity Broadcasting Network has recognized BFC as one of the largest Christian motorcycle ministries in the world. In a 2010 radio interview with Christian metal radio program The Full Armor of God Broadcast, Pastor Z. talked about their worldwide ministry. As of April 2020 - Zariczny states that BFC currently has Chapters in 50 states and 24 countries including: Australia, all over Europe, the Netherlands, Germany, Belgium, Lithuania, South Africa, and Sweden. BFC sponsors several motorcycle events to raise money for the handicapped, underprivileged and disabled. BFC also sponsors events to honor Vietnam Veterans where a 370-foot (110 m) mini replica of the Vietnam Veterans Memorial Wall is displayed publicly. Pastor Fred is married to his wife Esther. They have seven children, thirteen grandchildren, and a great granddaughter. Pastor Z. is known for his tattoos after having the BFC membership patch logo tattooed on his back by Kim Saigh on LA Ink. Pastor Z. also plays Bass Guitar in the BFC Full Throttle Band - with his Band-Mate: Eric Turner on Lead Vocals & Lead Guitars, and multiple drummers. The Full Throttle Band has played at: Sturgis, Daytona, Hollister, Arizona Bike Week, and many Motorcycle Club parties. The band plays Classic Rock biker tunes and also quite a few Christian Originals written by Eric Turner, Darrell Mansfield, etc. Pastor Z. also takes pictures, and writes articles for the secular motorcycle magazine Quick Throttle.

== See also ==
- Temple Riders
