= Latter Day Saint movement =

Religious movement

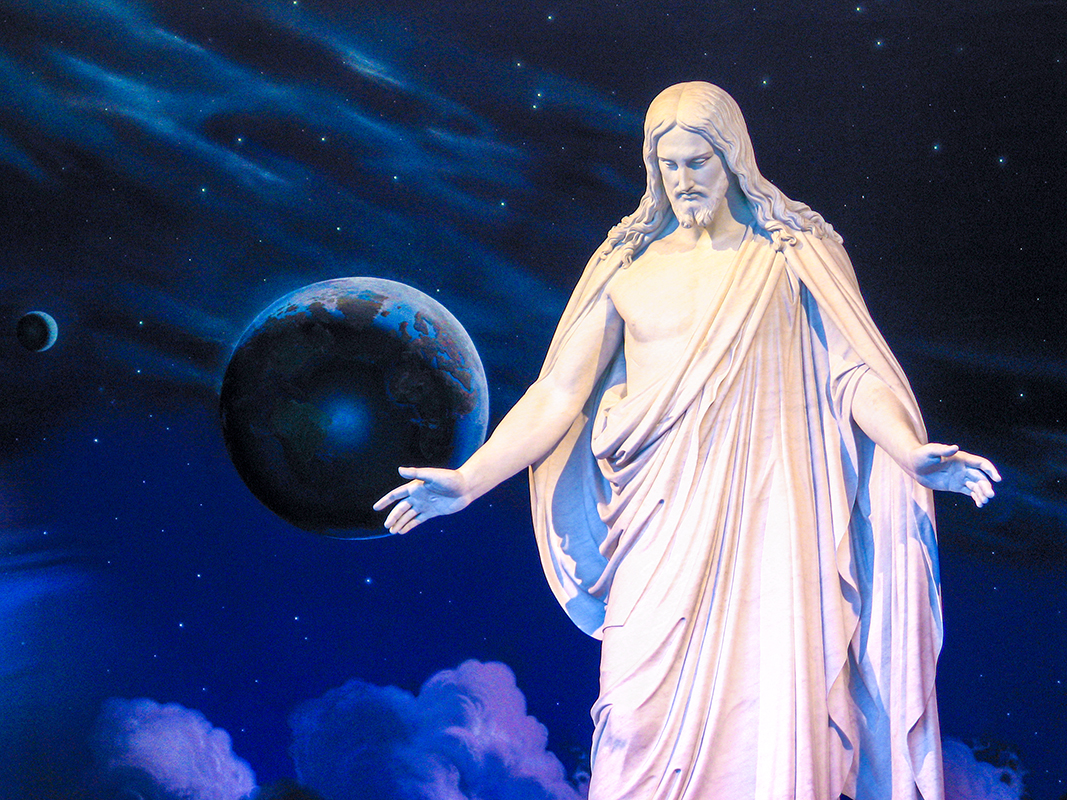
Adherents follow Jesus Christ as the central figure of their religion.

The Latter Day Saint movement (also called the LDS movement, LDS restorationist movement, or Smith–Rigdon movement) is the collection of independent church groups that trace their origins to a Christian Restorationist movement founded in the United States by Joseph Smith in the late 1820s.

Collectively, these churches have nearly 18 million nominal members. The vast majority, more than 17 million, belong to the Church of Jesus Christ of Latter-day Saints (LDS Church). About 250,000 belong to the Community of Christ, formerly known as the Reorganized Church of Jesus Christ of Latter-day Saints. The remainder belong to other denominations with memberships generally ranging in the thousands. The predominant theology of the churches in the movement is Mormonism, which sees itself as restoring again on Earth the early Christian church; their members are most commonly known as Mormons. An additional doctrine of the church allows for prophets to receive and publish modern-day revelations.

A minority of Latter Day Saint adherents, such as members of Community of Christ, have been influenced by Protestant theologies while maintaining certain distinctive beliefs and practices including continuing revelation, an open canon of scripture and building temples. Other groups include the Remnant Church of Jesus Christ of Latter Day Saints, which supports lineal succession of leadership from Smith's descendants, and the more controversial Fundamentalist Church of Jesus Christ of Latter-Day Saints, which defends the practice of polygamy. One source has estimated that over 400 denominations have sprung from founder Joseph Smith's original movement.

== Origins ==
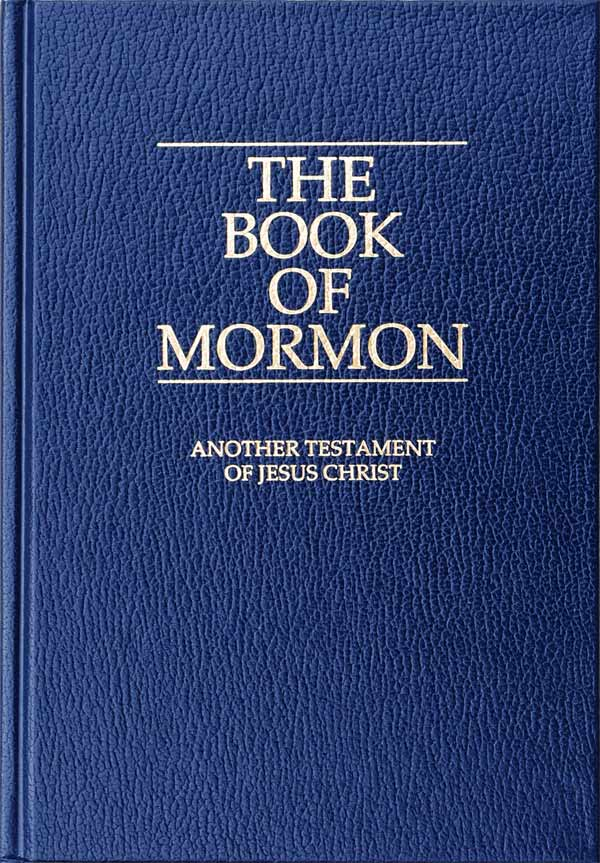
The Book of Mormon, one of the religious texts of the movement.

The movement began in western New York during the Second Great Awakening when Smith said that he received visions revealing a new sacred text, the Book of Mormon, which he published in 1830 as a complement to the Bible. Based on the teachings of this book and other revelations, Smith founded a Christian primitivist church, called the "Church of Christ". The Book of Mormon attracted hundreds of early followers, who later became known as "Mormons", "Latter Day Saints", or just "Saints". In 1831, Smith moved the church headquarters to Kirtland, Ohio, and in 1838 changed its name to the "Church of Jesus Christ of Latter Day Saints".

After the church in Ohio collapsed due to a financial crisis and dissensions, in 1838, Smith and the body of the church moved to Missouri. However, they were persecuted and the Latter Day Saints fled to Illinois. After Smith was killed in 1844, a succession crisis led to the organization splitting into several groups. The largest of these, the LDS Church, migrated under the leadership of Brigham Young to the Great Basin (now Utah) and became known for its 19th-century practice of polygamy. The LDS Church officially renounced this practice in 1890 and gradually discontinued it, resulting in Utah Territory becoming a U.S. state. This change resulted in the formation of several small sects that sought to maintain polygamy and other 19th-century doctrines and practices, now referred to as "Mormon fundamentalism".

Other groups originating within the Latter Day Saint movement followed different paths in Missouri, Illinois, Michigan, and Pennsylvania. For the most part, these groups rejected plural marriage and some of Smith's later teachings. The largest of these, Community of Christ (known previously as the "Reorganized Church of Jesus Christ of Latter Day Saints"), was formed in Illinois in 1860 by several groups uniting around Smith's son, Joseph Smith III.

== History ==
The founder of the Latter Day Saint movement was Joseph Smith, and to a lesser extent, during the movement's first two years, Oliver Cowdery. Throughout his life, Smith told of an experience he had as a boy having seen God the Father and Jesus Christ as two separate beings, who told him that the true church of Jesus Christ had been lost and would be restored through him, and that he would be given the authority to organize and lead the true Church of Christ.

The Latter Day Saint church was formed on April 6, 1830, consisting of a community of believers in the western New York towns of Fayette, Manchester, and Colesville. The church was formally organized under the name of the "Church of Christ". By 1834, the church was referred to as the "Church of the Latter Day Saints" in early church publications, and in 1838 Smith announced that he had received a revelation from God that officially changed the name to the "Church of Jesus Christ of Latter Day Saints".

In 1844, William Law and several other Latter Day Saints in church leadership positions publicly denounced Smith's secret practice of polygamy in the Nauvoo Expositor, and formed their own church. The city council of Nauvoo, Illinois, led by Smith, subsequently had the printing press of the Expositor destroyed. In spite of Smith's later offer to pay damages for destroyed property, critics of Smith and the church considered the destruction heavy-handed. Some called for the Latter Day Saints to be either expelled or destroyed.

Joseph Smith and his brother, Hyrum, the Assistant President of the Church, were both killed by a mob while in a Carthage, Illinois jail, and several individuals within the church claimed to be the senior surviving authority and appointed successors. These various claims resulted in a succession crisis. Many supported Brigham Young, the president of the Quorum of the Twelve Apostles; others Sidney Rigdon, the senior surviving member of the First Presidency. Emma Hale Smith failed to persuade William Marks, the president of the Presiding High Council and a Rigdon supporter, to assume leadership and the surviving members of Smith's immediate family remained unaffiliated with any larger body until 1860, when they formed the Reorganized Church of Jesus Christ of Latter Day Saints with Joseph's eldest son Joseph Smith III as prophet. These various groups are sometimes referred to under two geographical headings: "Prairie Saints" (those that remained in the Midwest United States); and "Rocky Mountain Saints" (those who followed Young to what would later become the state of Utah).

Today, the vast majority (over 98 percent) of Latter Day Saints belong to the LDS Church, which reports over 16 million members worldwide. The second-largest denomination is the Missouri-based Community of Christ, which reports 252,000 members. Small denominations that trace their origins to Rigdon, James Strang, or other associates of Smith's still exist, and several fundamentalist sects which separated from the LDS Church after it rejected plural marriage in 1890 claim tens of thousands of members. (Note: The term Mormon fundamentalist appears to have been coined in the 1940s by apostle Mark E. Petersen.)

== Beliefs ==
Most members of Latter Day Saint churches are adherents to Mormonism, a theology based on Joseph Smith's later teachings and further developed by Brigham Young, James Strang and others who claimed to be Smith's successors. The term Mormon derives from the Book of Mormon, and most of these adherents refer to themselves as Latter Day Saints or Mormons. Mormonism and Christianity have a complex theological, historical, and sociological relationship. Mormons express the doctrines of Mormonism using standard biblical terminology, and claim to have similar views about the nature of Jesus' atonement, resurrection, and Second Coming as traditional Christianity. Nevertheless, Mormons agree with non-Mormons that their view of God is significantly different from the trinitarian view of the Nicene Creed of the 4th century.

Mormons consider the Bible as scripture and have also adopted additional scriptures. These include the Book of Mormon, Doctrine and Covenants, and Pearl of Great Price, although not all denominations use all books as part of their scriptures. Mormons not only practice baptism and celebrate the eucharist but also participate in religious rituals not practiced in traditional Christianity. Focusing on differences, some Christians consider Mormonism "non-Christian"; members of the LDS Church, focusing on similarities, are offended at being so characterized. Mormons do not accept non-Mormon baptism. Mormons regularly proselytize individuals actually or nominally within the Christian tradition, and some Christians, especially evangelicals, proselytize Mormons. (Note: There are a number of books by evangelical Christians that explain how evangelicals can approach witnessing to Mormons including the following:) The LDS Church has a formal missionary program with nearly 70,000 missionaries, with 15 training centers and 407 missions worldwide. A prominent scholarly view is that Mormonism is a form of Christianity, but is distinct enough from traditional Christianity so as to form a new religious tradition, much as Christianity has roots in but is a distinct religion from Judaism.

The Mormonism that originated with Smith in the 1820s shared strong similarities with some elements of 19th-century Protestant Christianity including the necessity of baptism, emphasis on family, and central doctrine on Christ as a means to salvation. However, beginning with his accounts of the First Vision in the 1830s and 1840s, Smith—who said that Christ had told him not to join any existing church—departed significantly from traditional Christianity, claiming all churches of his day were part of a Great Apostasy that had lost the authority to direct Christ's church. Mormonism does not characterize itself as a Protestant religion, as Smith taught that he had received revelation direct from Christ to restore his original church. Mormons believe that God, through Smith and his successors, restored these truths and doctrinal clarifications, and, initiating a new heavenly dispensation, restored the original church and Christianity taught by Jesus. For example, Smith rejected the Nicene doctrine of the Trinity as of one body and substance, with no "body, parts, or passions", and instead taught that the Godhead included God, the Eternal Father, also known as Elohim; his only-begotten son in the flesh, Jesus Christ, also known as Jehovah, the savior and redeemer of the world; and the Holy Ghost or Holy Spirit, an individual personage of spirit whose influence can be felt in many places at once. Further, Smith taught that the essence of all humans is co-eternal with God and that humans, as the spirit offspring of God the Father, have the potential to become like God. The LDS Church, the largest Mormon denomination, while acknowledging its differences with mainstream Christianity, often focuses on its commonalities, which are many, the most important of which is that Christ is the savior of the world and that he suffered for the world's sins so that the penitent can return to live in heaven.

A small fraction of Latter Day Saints, most notably those within Community of Christ, the second largest Latter Day Saint denomination, follow a traditional Protestant theology. Community of Christ views God in trinitarian terms, and reject the distinctive theological developments they believe to have been developed later in Mormonism.

=== Saint-designation of members ===
The beliefs within the LDS Church with regard to saints are similar but not quite the same as the Protestant tradition. In the New Testament, saints are all those who have entered into the Christian covenant of baptism. The qualification "latter-day" refers to the doctrine that members are living in the "latter days", before the Second Coming of Christ, and is used to distinguish the members of the church, which considers itself the restoration of the ancient Christian church. Members are therefore often referred to as "Latter-day Saints" or "LDS", and among themselves, "saints".

=== Restoration ===
The Latter Day Saint movement classifies itself within Christianity, but as a distinct restored dispensation. Latter Day Saints hold that a Great Apostasy began in Christianity not long after the ascension of Jesus, marked with the corruption of Christian doctrine by Greek and other philosophies, and followers dividing into different ideological groups. Additionally, Latter Day Saints claim the martyrdom of the apostles led to a loss of priesthood authority to administer the church and its ordinances.

According to Latter Day Saint churches, God re-established the early Christian church as found in the New Testament through Joseph Smith. (Note: Smith's restoration was slightly different from other restorationists of the era (for instance, that of Alexander Campbell). Instead of analyzing the Bible, Smith claimed to write and interpret scripture as the biblical prophets did.) In particular, Latter Day Saints believe that angels such as Peter, James, John, and John the Baptist appeared to Smith and others and bestowed various priesthood authorities on them. Thus, Smith and his successors are considered modern prophets who receive revelation from God to guide the church.

== Denominations ==
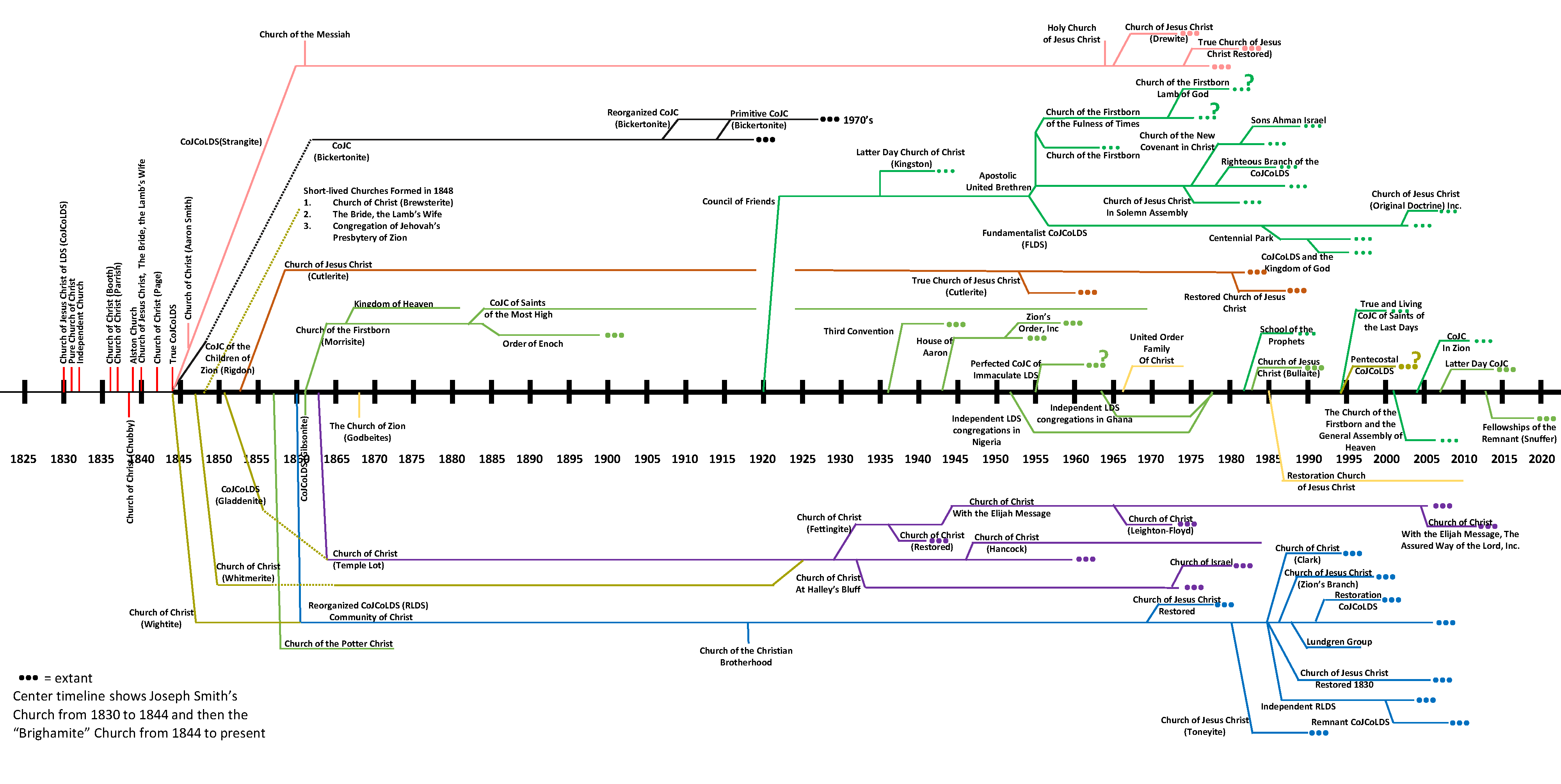
Diagram showing over 70 branches of Mormonism with their relative origins and approximate years of division. The thicker central line after 1844 is the largest by numbers Brighamite branch.

== See also ==
- Criticism of the Church of Jesus Christ of Latter-day Saints
- Temple Riders
- New religious movement
- Universalism and the Latter Day Saint movement
