= Saigh =

Saigh is a surname. Notable people with the surname include:

- Fred Saigh (1905–1999), American sports executive
- Kim Saigh (born 1973), American tattoo artist and television personality
