= Black Ink Crew: Chicago season 3 =

Black Ink Crew: Chicago
- Season 3
- Cover used by the iTunes Store
- Starring: Ryan Henry; Katrina Jackson; Charmaine Walker; Phor Brumfield; Van Johnson; Danielle Jamison; Don Brumfield
- No. of episodes: 18

Release
- Original network: VH1
- Original release: July 19 – December 6, 2017

Season chronology
- ← Previous; Season 2 Next → Season 4

The third season of the reality television series Black Ink Crew: Chicago aired on VH1 from July 19, 2017, until December 6, 2017. It chronicles the daily operations and staff drama at an African American owned and operated tattoo shop, 9MAG, located in Chicago, Illinois.

== Main cast ==
- Ryan Henry
- Katrina Jackson
- Charmaine Walker
- Phor Brumfield
- Van Johnson
- Danielle Jamison
- Don Brumfield

== Recurring cast ==
- Ashley P
- Cobra Kat
- JR Diaz
- NeekBay
- Nikki
- Rachel
- Liliana
- Jenn

== Episodes ==
No. overall	No. in season	Title	Original release date	US viewers (millions)
21	1	"The New Barack and Michelle Obama"	July 19, 2017	0.88
Ryan battles his staff over their growing disrespect; Don and Ashley's marital bliss becomes threatened; Kat leaves Chicago; Van starts a brawl; Ashley starts trouble with Charmaine.
22	2	"You Need Jesus"	July 26, 2017	1.02
Ryan makes a move to assert his authority; Ashley wants Don to control his anger; Danielle confronts Kat about being a bad friend; Van gets locked out of the shop.
23	3	"The Return of Cobra"	August 2, 2017	0.91
Danielle confronts Ryan, putting a damper on Charmaine's birthday party; Ryan attends a tattoo convention in Philadelphia; Van and Danielle take over the shop; Ryan rehires a former employee; Kat shocks the crew.
24	4	"Kat's Back"	August 9, 2017	0.91
Kat invites the crew to a lake house; Charmaine's job is in jeopardy; Nikki learns that Phor sent roses to Kat; Ryan and Van come to blows.
25	5	"Work Is Work, But Can You Twerk?"	August 16, 2017	1.06
The crew is smitten when Ryan hires a new artist; Phor's peace offering sends Nikki over the edge; Ashley gives Don a taste of his own medicine; Lily hooks up.
26	6	"This One Time at Van Camp"	August 23, 2017	1.00
Danielle reveals an explosive secret about Kat; JR and Lily take their relationship to the next level; Van freaks out when Jenn mentions the "m" word; Charmaine grills Ryan about Kat; all hell breaks loose at Phor's concert.
27	7	"My Cousin Janelle"	August 30, 2017	1.07
Don starts his new career as a piercer; Charmaine receives devastating news from her mother; Phor tries to reconnect with family; Cobra is turned on by her new roommate; Nikki goes ballistic.
28	8	"Surprise, I'm Pregnant!"	September 6, 2017	1.13
Don freaks out after Ashley reveals shocking news; Lily and Cobra come to blows; Van struggles to deal with the aftermath of his breakup; Ryan throws a party for hip-hop group Bone Thugs-n-Harmony.
29	9	"I Like My Tamales Real"	September 13, 2017	1.07
Lily jeopardizes her relationship with JR; Cobra confronts Ryan about an Internet rumor; Van devises a plan to win Jenn back; Danielle throws a fashion show.
30	10	"Freeze My Fupa!"	October 9, 2017	1.11
Ryan returns to the shop after a major health scare; JR learns disturbing information about his relationship with Lily; Phor questions his career; Lily takes down Cobra.
31	11	"Lola From Nola"	October 18, 2017	1.02
Kat questions her life in Los Angeles; Lily tries to turn the shop against Cobra; Charmaine's career takes priority; Nikki becomes jealous, again; Don blows up.
32	12	"I Feel Like Beyonce"	October 25, 2017	1.03
An injury prevents Ryan from tatting his childhood idols; Charmaine tries to convince Cobra to stay; Jenn's wardrobe malfunction upsets Van.
33	13	"Chi-Cabo – Part 1"	November 1, 2017	1.08
The crew heads to Mexico for some fun, sun and tequila; Kat's unexpected arrival at the villa creates tension; Ryan loses his cool when Lily crosses a line; Kat reveals a shocking secret.
34	14	"Chi-Cabo – Part 2"	November 8, 2017	1.02
Cobra needs to make a tough decision; Lily tries to reunite with her sisters; Kat decides that Rachel needs to know the truth.
35	15	"My Little Sir Brumfield"	November 15, 2017	1.00
Ryan tries salvaging his relationship with Rachel; Phor and Nikki take their relationship to new heights; the crew throws Kat a surprise birthday party behind Ryan's back.
36	16	"I Cleared My Truth"	November 22, 2017	0.86
The crew hatches a plan to get Kat to come back to 9Mag; Ashley throws a tantrum at her gender reveal party; Charmaine's dreams of movie stardom hang in the balance; Kat confronts Ryan over what happened at the lake house.
37	17	"Everybody Loves Kat"	November 29, 2017	1.02
Ryan blows up after his staff betrays him; Neek accepts a project in Africa and Charmaine goes to extreme lengths to keep him in Chicago; Lily hooks up with another 9Mag tattoo artist.
38	18	"Go Ahead, Becky"	December 6, 2017	1.20
Kat and Lily are grilled about the hook up; differences are put aside to honor Don's sister; Lily opens up about her past; Ryan invites the crew to a lake house.
