= Black Ink Crew: Chicago season 1 =

Season of television series

Black Ink Crew: Chicago
- Season 1
- Cover used by the iTunes Store
- Starring: Ryan Henry; Katrina Jackson; Van Johnson; Phor Brumfield; Don Brumfield; Charmaine Walker; Danielle Jamison
- No. of episodes: 10

Release
- Original network: VH1
- Original release: October 26 – December 28, 2015

Season chronology
- Next → Season 2

The first season of the reality television series Black Ink Crew: Chicago aired on VH1 from October 26, 2015 until December 28, 2015. It chronicles the daily operations and staff drama at an African American owned and operated tattoo shop 9MAG located in Chicago, Illinois.

== Main cast ==
- Ryan Henry
- Katrina Jackson
- Van Johnson
- Phor Brumfield
- Don Brumfield
- Charmaine Walker
- Danielle Jamison

== Recurring cast ==
- Ashley Pickens
- Terrance
- Rachel

== Episodes ==
No. overall	No. in season	Title	Original release date	US viewers (millions)
1	1	"We Run Chicago"	October 26, 2015	1.80
In a city defined by survival of the fittest, the crew gathers to celebrate 9 Mag’s one-year anniversary and honor the memory of Ryan’s late sister Nova. But when a surprise visitor shows up, the real drama begins.
2	2	"What You Don't Understand Is, I Do Understand"	November 2, 2015	1.90
Ryan is turning 29, so the crew plans a surprise party. Don tries to make things right with his girlfriend Ashley. Charmaine confronts Don about text messages and Ryan’s world gets rocked by unexpected a phone call.
3	3	"Phor Play"	November 9, 2015	2.03
With his first solo music performance approaching, Phor puts it all on the line and pursues a relationship with Kat. After a harsh meeting with his lawyer, Van’s future at 9 Mag is in jeopardy. Ashley confronts Charmaine.
4	4	"Ain't No Prop, Clown"	November 16, 2015	1.73
After confronting Charmaine at Phor’s concert, Ashley makes a shocking decision about their relationship. All eyes are on Kat when she does a sexy photo shoot for Urban Ink Magazine. Ryan spirals out of control.
5	5	"New York, New Problems"	November 23, 2015	1.75
After Ryan’s meltdown, Kat and Van confront him. When the crew questions Kat's loyalty to the shop, tensions escalate. On the heels of his successful concert, Phor heads to the Big Apple for a meeting with a big music executive.
6	6	"You're Not God and You're Not My Daddy"	November 30, 2015	1.92
The rest of the 9Mag crew heads to New York City to lend support to Kat. Ceaser and the NY crew throw a mixxxy party in their honor, but things turn ugly. Ryan is finally fed up with Kat's ego.
7	7	"Kat Fight!"	December 14, 2015	1.71
After returning from NYC, Charmaine reveals a secret. Don works on mending things with Ashley, while Danielle's relationship is tested. And, when Kat discovers that the guys are talking behind her back, things become uncertain.
8	8	"Yacht Rocked"	December 21, 2015	1.65
Ryan decides to throw a shop appreciation party in true Chicago fashion...on a yacht! Danielle's confusion about her ex lands her right into Ryan's arms. And when Ashley shows up on the boat, things go from bad to worse.
9	9	"The Don Sets in Paradise"	December 28, 2015	1.96
Shocking news at Van's court appearance leaves him wondering if he should run. When the girls fail to visit Kat, she questions their loyalty. Don decides to take Ashley on a weekend trip to prove his commitment.
10	10	"Goodbye Doesn't Mean Forever"	December 28, 2015	1.78
The 9Mag crew hosts an event to help victims of violent crimes. Don tries to win Ashley back. Van is forced to make a life-changing decision. And at a birthday celebration for Ryan's late sister, an unexpected guest arrives.
