= Vermin (disambiguation) =

Vermin are animal species regarded as pests.

Vermin or Varmints may also refer to:

== Entertainment ==
- Vermin (album), a 2005 album by Old Man's Child
- Vermin (character), a Marvel Comics supervillain
- Vermin (video game), a 1980 Nintendo Game & Watch game
- The Vermin, an American punk band
- "Varmints" (Adventure Time), a television episode
- Varmints (album), an album by Anna Meredith

== Politics ==
- Vermin Club, a British Conservative Party grassroots organisation of the 1940s
- Operation Vermin, a 1952 East German Stasi operation

== People ==
- Vermin Supreme (born 1961), American performance artist, anarchist, and activist
- Joël Vermin (born 1992), Swiss ice hockey player
