= Black Ink Crew: Chicago season 2 =

Black Ink Crew: Chicago
- Season 2
- Cover used by the iTunes Store
- Starring: Ryan Henry; Katrina Jackson; Van Johnson; Phor Brumfield; Don Brumfield; Charmaine Walker; Danielle Jamison
- No. of episodes: 10

Release
- Original network: VH1
- Original release: October 3 – November 28, 2016

Season chronology
- ← Previous; Season 1 Next → Season 3

The second season of the reality television series Black Ink Crew: Chicago aired on VH1 from October 3, 2016, until November 28, 2016. It chronicles the daily operations and staff drama at an African American owned and operated tattoo shop 9MAG in Chicago, Illinois.

== Main cast ==
- Ryan Henry
- Katrina Jackson
- Van Johnson
- Phor Brumfield
- Don Brumfield
- Charmaine Walker
- Danielle Jamison

== Recurring cast ==
- Ashley Pickens
- Terrance
- Cobra Kat
- Junior Diaz
- Whitney Womack
- Ariel

== Episodes ==
No. overall	No. in season	Title	Original release date	US viewers (millions)
11	1	"The Nicki Minaj of 9 Mag"	October 3, 2016	1.56
Ryan steps up his boss game when he learns that his staff is taking advantage of him. Kat betrays 9 Mag in order to take her Kat Tat brand to the next level. Don’s old college fling claims that he’s the father of her child, threatening his engagement to Ashley. When the crew turns up for the biggest performance of Phor’s career, all hell breaks loose.
12	2	"Prison on the Outside, Party on the Inside"	October 3, 2016	1.38
The shop is up in arms after Ryan hires a new tattoo artist. Fists fly when Kat learns that Charmaine threw her personal items in the trash. Don takes a paternity test hoping to squash the rumors that he fathered a love child. Van is finally released from boot camp but rising tensions in the shop could put a damper on his happy homecoming.
13	3	"99.999998 Percent"	October 10, 2016	1.74
Don’s paternity test results send him on a downward spiral. Ryan dips his toes back in the dating pool. Van has an emotional reunion with his daughter after being separated from her for four months. Danielle’s birthday celebration turns into chaos when Ashley and her friends crash the party and attack Charmaine.
14	4	"A New Kat-itude"	October 17, 2016	1.73
Van returns to work at 9 Mag but is angered that the shop has changed. Charmaine is forced to face the consequences of quitting her corporate job and following her dreams. Ashley confronts Don about fathering another child with another woman.
15	5	"Broke on Bourbon Street"	October 24, 2016	1.66
The crew heads to New Orleans for some Bourbon Street debauchery. Charmaine’s family demands that the she moves back home when they find out she’s broke. Don is caught off guard when his baby mama Whitney ambushes him at 9 Mag. Van reaches his boiling point after Cobra confronts the crew about the cleanliness of the shop.
16	6	"Congratulations, You Played Yourself"	October 31, 2016	1.38
Don brings his two baby mamas together in hopes of uniting his family, but Whitney has no intention of making nice. Ryan celebrates his 30th birthday in style with a Great Gatsby themed bash, but the celebration comes to a halt when Van confronts Cobra about her behavior. And Danielle’s boyfriend Terrence makes a fool of himself when his jealousy gets the best of him.
17	7	"Cobra Gets Rattled"	November 7, 2016	1.79
Don receives some life-shattering news that could send him back into a spiral. Charmaine is determined to improve her financial situation and auditions to be a radio DJ. In the wake of one of the deadliest weekends in Chicago history, Phor heads into the studio with one of hip hop’s top rappers to record a song about peace. When Cobra’s behavior becomes questionable, Ryan is forced to make a tough decision about her future at 9 Mag.
18	8	"Basic People Have Threesomes"	November 14, 2016	1.75
With his jail sentence looming, Don pushes up his wedding date. Kat hosts her first art show, but things turn sour when Phor shows up with the woman he cheated on Kat with. Van’s relationship is tested after he confesses to his girlfriend that he’s not a one-woman kind of guy. Phor’s girlfriend Nikki confronts Kat about her attitude at a 9 Mag party—and things get physical.
19	9	"Que Grande"	November 21, 2016	1.91
The 9 Mag crew heads to the Dominican Republic for Don’s wedding. Kat confronts Phor about cheating on her when they were together. Van’s threesome goes horribly wrong when his girlfriend brings a surprise guest to share in on the fun. And Don gets a little too friendly with a stripper, jeopardizing his wedding to Ashley.
20	10	"Team Don"	November 28, 2016	2.12
Ashley arrives in the DR for her wedding day and enlists her brother to spy on Don’s bachelor party. Terrence crashes Don’s wedding weekend and gives Danielle an ultimatum—him or 9 Mag. And Ashley threatens to call off the wedding when she sees scandalous photos of Don at his bachelor party.
