= Black Ink Crew: Chicago =

American reality TV series (2015–22)

- Genre: Reality
- Starring: Ryan Henry; Katrina Jackson; Van Johnson; Phor Robinson; Don Brumfield; Charmaine Walker; Danielle Jamison; Liliana Barrios; Karis Phillips; Jessica Simpson; Draya Penzo; Prince Spencer
- Country of origin: United States
- Original language: English
- No. of seasons: 7
- No. of episodes: 110

Production
- Executive producers: Dan Cesareo; Doug DePriest; David Wolfgang; Ken Martinez; Rasheed Daniel; Kim Osorio; Kari Mcfarland; Rick Hankey; Shelley Sinha
- Running time: 42–46 minutes
- Production companies: Big Fish Entertainment (2015–2020); MTV Entertainment Studios (2021–2022)

Original release
- Network: VH1
- Release: October 26, 2015 – October 11, 2022

Related
- Black Ink Crew; Black Ink Crew: Los Angeles

Black Ink Crew: Chicago is an American reality television series that airs on VH1 and premiered on October 26, 2015. It is the Chicago-based spin-off of Black Ink Crew. It chronicles the daily operations and staff drama at an African American owned and operated tattoo shop, 9MAG, located in Chicago, Illinois.

== Cast ==
=== Cast timeline ===
Main cast members
Cast member	Seasons							
Cast member	1	2	3	4	5	6	7a	7b
Ryan Henry	Starring							
Kat Jackson	Starring					Guest		
Charmaine Walker	Starring							
Phor Brumfield	Starring							
Van Johnson	Starring					Supporting		Supporting
Danielle Jamison	Starring				Supporting	Guest		
Don Brumfield	Starring							
Lily Barrios			Supporting	Starring		Guest		
Jess Simpson						Starring		
Miss Kitty					Guest	Supporting	Starring	
Draya Penzo						Supporting		Starring
Prince Spencer						Supporting		Starring
Supporting cast members
Cast member	Seasons							
Cast member	1	2	3	4	5	6	7a	7b
Ashley Brumfield	Supporting							
Rachel Leigh	Supporting	Guest	Supporting		Guest	Supporting		
Junior Diaz		Supporting						
Cobra Kat		Supporting						
Whitney Womack		Supporting	Guest					
Ariel Perkins		Supporting						
Nikki Nicole		Guest	Supporting		Guest			
Neek Bey			Supporting	Guest	Supporting			
Jenn Johnson	Guest		Supporting			Guest		
Bella Tatted				Supporting				
Reese Hilburn				Supporting	Guest			
Brittany Slam				Supporting				
Damn Gina					Supporting			
Shine Davis					Supporting			
Evenita McGruder					Supporting			
Adriana Garibay				Guest	Supporting			
Fly Tatted						Supporting		
King Plug						Supporting		
Zach						Supporting		
Nina Austin							Supporting	
Ceaser Emanuel							Supporting	
Steven Morris						Supporting		Guest
Miriah Mark							Supporting	
Shogun							Supporting	
Ceci							Supporting	
Spyder								Supporting

=== Main cast members ===
- Ryan Henry, owner of 9MAG and tattoo artist. Ex-boyfriend of Rachel. Ex-lover of Katrina.
- Van Johnson (seasons 1–5; recurring seasons 6–7B), tattoo artist
- Corey "Phor Brumfield" Robinson, tattoo artist. Ex-boyfriend of Nikki and Kat.
- Don Brumfield, piercer, manager, younger brother of Phor, and Ashley's husband
- Charmaine Walker (seasons 1–7A), owner of 2nd City Ink, wife of Neek Bey, ex-fling of Don Brumfield
- Liliana "Lily" Barrios (seasons 4–5; recurring season 3; guest season 6), tattoo artist and Junior's ex-girlfriend
- Katrina "Kat" Jackson (seasons 1–3; guest season 6), tattoo artist and Phor Brumfield's ex-girlfriend
- Danielle Jamison (seasons 1–4; recurring seasons 5–7A), ex-receptionist and Charmaine's cousin
- Jessica "Jess" Simpson (season 6), co-owner of 2nd City Ink and tattoo artist
- Karis "Miss Kitty" Phillips (season 7; recurring season 6; guest season 5), brand ambassador and brand manager for Black Ink, 2nd City Ink
- Andrea "Draya" Penso (season 7B; recurring seasons 6–7A), tattoo artist at 2nd City Ink & 9MAG
- Prince Spencer (season 7B; recurring seasons 6–7A), tattoo artist at 2nd City Ink & 9MAG

=== Supporting cast members ===
- Ashley Brumfield (seasons 1–7), Don's wife
- Rachel Leigh (seasons 1, 3–4, 6; guest seasons 2, 5), Ryan's ex-girlfriend
- Cobra Kat (seasons 2–5), tattoo artist
- Junior Diaz (seasons 2–5), tattoo artist and Lily's ex-boyfriend
- Terrence (seasons 1–2, 4; guest season 3), Danielle's husband
- Whitney Womack (season 2), Don's daughter's mother
- Ariel (season 2), Charmaine's friend and Ryan's ex-lover
- NeekBey (seasons 3, 5–7A; guest season 4), Charmaine's husband
- Nikki (seasons 3–4; guest seasons 2, 5–6), Phor's ex-girlfriend and Kat's rival
- Jenn (seasons 3–5; guest seasons 1–2, 6), Van's girlfriend
- Reese (season 4; guest season 5), tattoo artist at Loyal Ink
- Bella (seasons 4–6), former 9Mag assistant
- Brittney Slam (seasons 4–7), 9Mag manager
- Gina (seasons 5–7), Ryan's assistant
- Shine (season 5), tattoo artist
- Evenita (season 5), Van's apprentice
- Adriana (season 5; guest season 4), Junior's girlfriend and Lily's rival
- Fly Tatted (season 6), former tattoo artist at 2nd City Ink
- Plug (seasons 6–7A), tattoo artist at 2nd City Ink
- Zach (season 6), former tattoo artist at 2nd City Ink and Draya's former love interest
- Steven (seasons 6–7A; guest season 7B), tattoo artist at 2nd Ciity Ink and Jess's best friend from London
- Nina Austin (season 7), Phor's ex-girlfriend and mother of their son
- Miriah (season 7A), Charmaine's friend and Prince's ex-girlfriend
- Hiram Emmanuél "Shogun" (season 7), lead artist at 9MAG
- Ceci (season 7), tattoo artist at 2nd City Ink & 9MAG

== Episodes ==
Season	Episodes		Originally released	
Season	Episodes		First released	Last released
1	10		October 26, 2015	December 28, 2015
2	10		October 3, 2016	November 28, 2016
3	18		July 19, 2017	December 6, 2017
4	16		May 30, 2018	September 19, 2018
5	20		January 2, 2019	August 6, 2019
6	16		December 4, 2019	July 27, 2020
7	20	10	October 4, 2021	December 6, 2021
7	20	10	August 9, 2022	October 11, 2022

=== Season 1 (2015) ===
No. overall	No. in season	Title	Original release date	U.S. viewers (millions)
1	1	"We Run Chicago"	October 26, 2015	1.80
2	2	"What You Don't Understand Is, I Do Understand"	November 2, 2015	1.90
3	3	"Phor Play"	November 9, 2015	2.03
4	4	"Ain't No Prop, Clown"	November 16, 2015	1.73
5	5	"New York, New Problems"	November 23, 2015	1.75
6	6	"You're Not God and You're Not My Daddy"	November 30, 2015	1.92
7	7	"Kat Fight!"	December 14, 2015	1.71
8	8	"Yacht Rocked"	December 21, 2015	1.65
9	9	"The Don Sets in Paradise"	December 28, 2015	1.96
10	10	"Goodbye Doesn't Mean Forever"	December 28, 2015	1.78

=== Season 2 (2016) ===
No. overall	No. in season	Title	Original release date	U.S. viewers (millions)
11	1	"The Nicki Minaj of 9 Mag"	October 3, 2016	1.56
12	2	"Prison on the Outside, Party on the Inside"	October 3, 2016	1.38
13	3	"99.999998 Percent"	October 10, 2016	1.74
14	4	"A New Kat-itude"	October 17, 2016	1.73
15	5	"Broke on Bourbon Street"	October 24, 2016	1.66
16	6	"Congratulations, You Played Yourself"	October 31, 2016	1.38
17	7	"Cobra Gets Rattled"	November 7, 2016	1.79
18	8	"Basic People Have Threesomes"	November 14, 2016	1.75
19	9	"Que Grande"	November 21, 2016	1.91
20	10	"Team Don"	November 28, 2016	2.12

=== Season 3 (2017) ===
No. overall	No. in season	Title	Original release date	U.S. viewers (millions)
21	1	"The New Barack and Michelle Obama"	July 19, 2017	0.88
22	2	"You Need Jesus"	July 26, 2017	1.03
23	3	"The Return of Cobra"	August 2, 2017	0.91
24	4	"Kat's Back"	August 9, 2017	0.91
25	5	"Work Is Work, But Can You Twerk?"	August 16, 2017	1.06
26	6	"This One Time at Van Camp"	August 23, 2017	1.01
27	7	"My Cousin Janelle"	August 30, 2017	1.07
28	8	"Surprise, I'm Pregnant!"	September 6, 2017	1.13
29	9	"I Like My Tamales Real"	September 13, 2017	1.07
30	10	"Freeze My Fupa!"	October 9, 2017	1.11
31	11	"Lola From Nola"	October 18, 2017	1.02
32	12	"I Feel Like Beyonce"	October 25, 2017	1.04
33	13	"Chi-Cabo – Part 1"	November 1, 2017	1.08
34	14	"Chi-Cabo – Part 2"	November 8, 2017	1.02
35	15	"My Little Sir Brumfield"	November 15, 2017	1.00
36	16	"I Cleared My Truth"	November 22, 2017	0.87
37	17	"Everybody Loves Kat"	November 29, 2017	1.02
38	18	"Go Ahead, Becky"	December 6, 2017	1.20

=== Season 4 (2018) ===
No. overall	No. in season	Title	Original release date	U.S. viewers (millions)
39	1	"The Takeover Begins"	May 30, 2018	1.15
40	2	"9Mag Is Dead"	June 6, 2018	1.01
41	3	"Tom, Dick, and Cobra"	June 13, 2018	1.10
42	4	"A Whole New Squad"	June 20, 2018	1.07
43	5	"New Lease, New Reese"	June 27, 2018	1.08
44	6	"The H.B.I.C."	July 11, 2018	1.10
45	7	"White Tacticals"	July 18, 2018	1.03
46	8	"Do The Hussle"	July 25, 2018	1.09
47	9	"Barbie Tingz"	August 1, 2018	0.96
48	10	"All Phor One"	August 8, 2018	1.03
49	11	"The Last Supper"	August 15, 2018	1.21
50	12	"Reese, Scheduled"	August 22, 2018	1.03
51	13	"Neek and You Shall Find"	August 29, 2018	1.10
52	14	"One Time At Adult Camp"	September 5, 2018	0.92
53	15	"I'm the New You"	September 12, 2018	1.00
54	16	"Welcome to 9Mag...Again!"	September 19, 2018	1.13

=== Season 5 (2019) ===
No. overall	No. in season	Title	Original release date	U.S. viewers (millions)
55	1	"9MAG is Forever"	January 2, 2019	1.07
56	2	"Give Me a Smoothie Gina"	January 9, 2019	0.96
57	3	"Tattoo Shop of Horrors"	January 16, 2019	0.93
58	4	"Michael Jackson is Alive!"	January 23, 2019	0.87
59	5	"She's Here If You Evenita"	January 30, 2019	0.94
60	6	"Phor"	February 6, 2019	0.89
61	7	"Potato with a Scarf On"	February 13, 2019	0.86
62	8	"I Didn't Say I Hate Her (I Just Don't Like Her)"	February 20, 2019	0.92
63	9	"I Hope You Make It to America"	February 27, 2019	0.76
64	10	"Lacuna Matata"	March 6, 2019	0.83
65	11	"Don't Come for Queen Latifah"	June 4, 2019	0.74
66	12	"Ryantology"	June 11, 2019	0.66
67	13	"Team Bonding!"	June 18, 2019	0.72
68	14	"From Chi-ami to Sky-ami"	June 25, 2019	0.78
69	15	"The Cover Up is Worse Than the Crime"	July 2, 2019	0.77
70	16	"What Is This, A Reunion Show?"	July 9, 2019	0.73
71	17	"The Steve Harvey Show"	July 16, 2019	0.71
72	18	"Deja Vu"	July 23, 2019	0.79
73	19	"The Vianna and the Long Haitian"	July 30, 2019	0.88
74	20	"Period, End of Sentence"	August 6, 2019	0.82

=== Season 6 (2019–20) ===
No. overall	No. in season	Title	Original release date	U.S. viewers (millions)
75	1	"The Future is Female"	December 4, 2019	0.72
76	2	"Proper Excited"	December 4, 2019	0.74
77	3	"World's Best Dad!"	December 11, 2019	0.60
78	4	"Second City, Welcome Kitty"	December 18, 2019	0.59
79	5	"My Big Fat Neek Wedding"	January 1, 2020	0.58
80	6	"Glenda"	January 8, 2020	0.75
81	7	"It's So Hard to Say Goodbye"	January 15, 2020	0.74
82	8	"The Itty Bitty Kitty Committee"	January 22, 2020	0.63
83	9	"Some People Like Cake, Some People Do Not Like Cake"	January 29, 2020	0.65
84	10	"Don's Latest Snapchat Video"	February 5, 2020	0.69
85	11	"Hot Off the Presses"	February 12, 2020	0.68
86	12	"Rumor Had It"	February 19, 2020	0.64
87	13	"Chicago Ain't That Big"	July 6, 2020	0.58
88	14	"Mucus Still Plugged"	July 13, 2020	0.55
89	15	"Other Side of the Pond"	July 20, 2020	0.54
90	16	"The Shutdown"	July 27, 2020	0.52

=== Season 7 (2021–22) ===
No. overall	No. in season	Title	Original release date	U.S. viewers (millions)
91	1	"Ready To Reclaim Our Time"	October 4, 2021	0.41
92	2	"Second Episode, Second City"	October 11, 2021	0.37
93	3	"What Happened With Us"	October 18, 2021	0.35
94	4	"Always and Phorever"	October 25, 2021	0.37
95	5	"Pros and Conventions"	November 1, 2021	0.33
96	6	"This Platform is Black Ink Crew"	November 8, 2021	0.40
97	7	"Is There A Doctor In The House?"	November 15, 2021	0.35
98	8	"A Prince Among Women"	November 22, 2021	0.30
99	9	"Did You Make That Comment About Charmaine?"	November 29, 2021	0.36
100	10	"Put on Your Casper Suit"	December 6, 2021	0.35
101	11	"Welcome to the World of Being Seen"	August 9, 2022	N/A
102	12	"Here Kitty Kitty"	August 16, 2022	N/A
103	13	"Fright of Our Lives"	August 23, 2022	N/A
104	14	"Phorplay"	August 30, 2022	N/A
105	15	"It's All Relative"	September 6, 2022	0.28
106	16	"Gin and Juke"	September 13, 2022	0.21
107	17	"Dude, Where's My Car?"	September 20, 2022	0.22
108	18	"I Love Lisa and Lisa Loves Me Back"	September 27, 2022	0.21
109	19	"Hey, I'm Walkin' Here!"	October 4, 2022	0.21
110	20	"Is This the End?"	October 11, 2022	0.25

== See also ==
- List of tattoo TV shows
