= Guy Aitchison =

American tattoo artist and painter

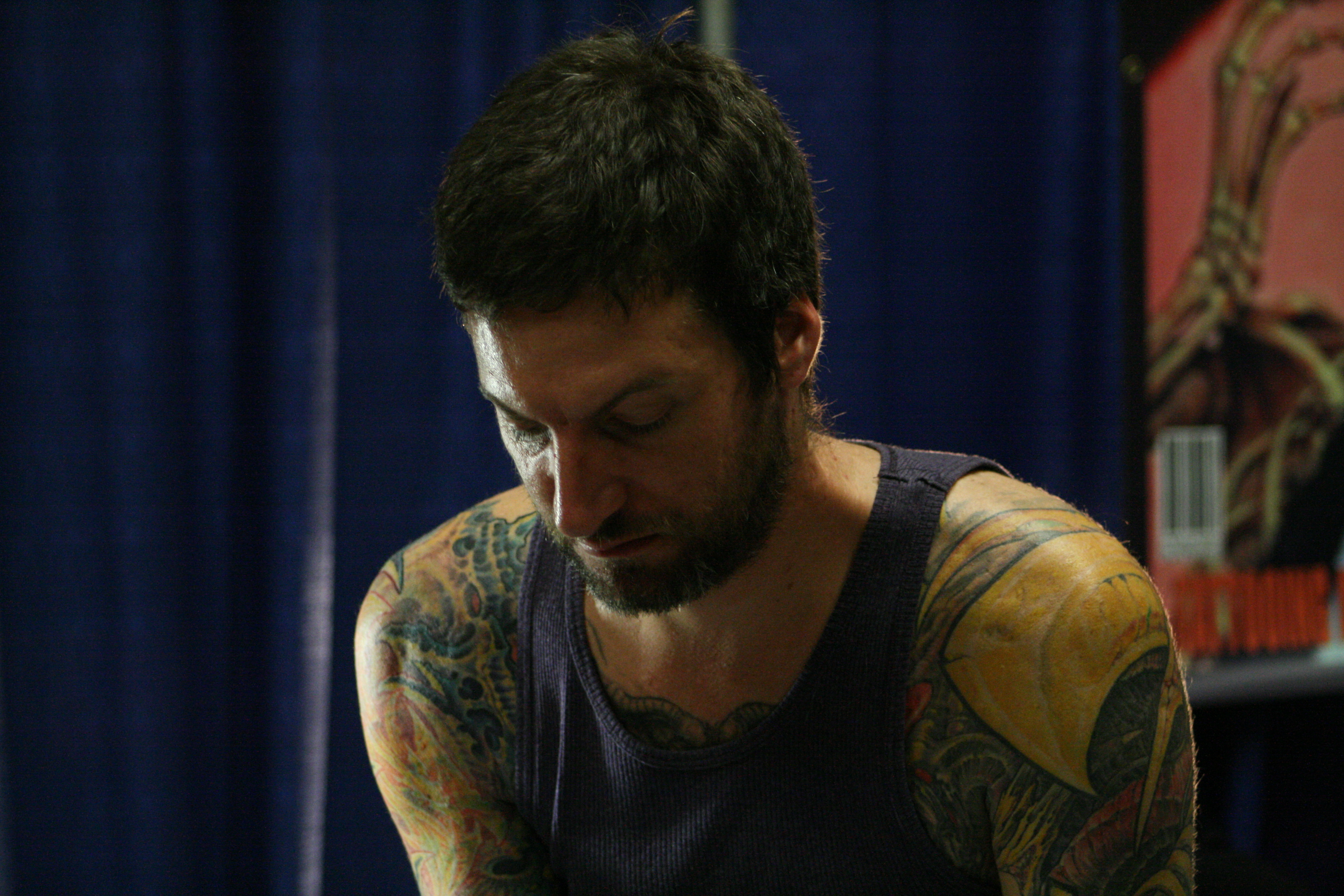
- Chicago Tattoo Arts Convention, 2008
- Born: 1968 (age 57–58); Ann Arbor, Michigan, U.S.
- Occupations: Tattoo artist; painter
- Spouse: Michele Wortman
- Relatives: Hannah Aitchison (sister)
- Website: www.guyaitchison.com

Guy Aitchison (born 1968) is an American tattoo artist and painter. He was featured on the tattoo reality television shows LA Ink and Tattoo Wars.

== Biography ==
Guy Aitchison was born in Michigan. He began painting album covers in 1985 and began tattooing in 1988. He has also released several books. He owns a studio called Hyperspace Studios with his wife, Michele Wortman, who is also a tattoo artist and painter. They were both on TLC's Tattoo Wars in 2007. He is the brother of tattoo artist and television personality, Hannah Aitchison. He was also a guest artist on LA Ink.

He gave Rob Zombie his first tattoo in 1989 when he was 21.

Guy Aitchison was already in an apprenticeship at the Jacklich Corporation in the art department by age 17. After completing his apprenticeship, he began painting record covers for Vinnie Moore, David Chastain, Apocrypha, Hex, Skatenigs, and mostly for California-based Shrapnel Records. In 1989, he began a tattooing apprenticeship at Bob Oslon's Custom Tattooing in Chicago for two years. He opened his own tattoo studio, Guilty & Innocent Productions, which remained a top standing shop until 1998 when it shut down so that he could move to the country to focus more on painting.

== Books ==
- Reinventing the Tattoo (2001)
- Organica (2005)
- The Biomech Encyclopedia (2019)
