= List of tattoo TV shows =

This is a partial list of notable television series that are primarily focused on the art of tattooing, and have articles on Wikipedia.

== TV shows ==
- Bad Ink (2013–2014)
- Best Ink (2012–2014)
- Black Ink Crew (2013–2023)
- Black Ink Crew: Chicago (2015–2022)
- Black Ink Crew: Compton (2019–2023)
- Bondi Ink Tattoo Crew (2015–2017)
- Epic Ink (2014)
- How Far Is Tattoo Far? (2018–2019)
- Ink Master (2012–present)
- Ink Master: Angels (2017–2018)
- Just Tattoo of Us (2017–2020)
- LA Ink (2007–2011)
- London Ink (2007–2009)
- Miami Ink (2005–2008)
- NY Ink (2011–2013)
- Tattoo Fixers (2015–2019)
- Tattoo Nightmares (2012–2015)
- Tattoo Titans (2013–2014)
