= Hannah Aitchison =

American tattoo artist

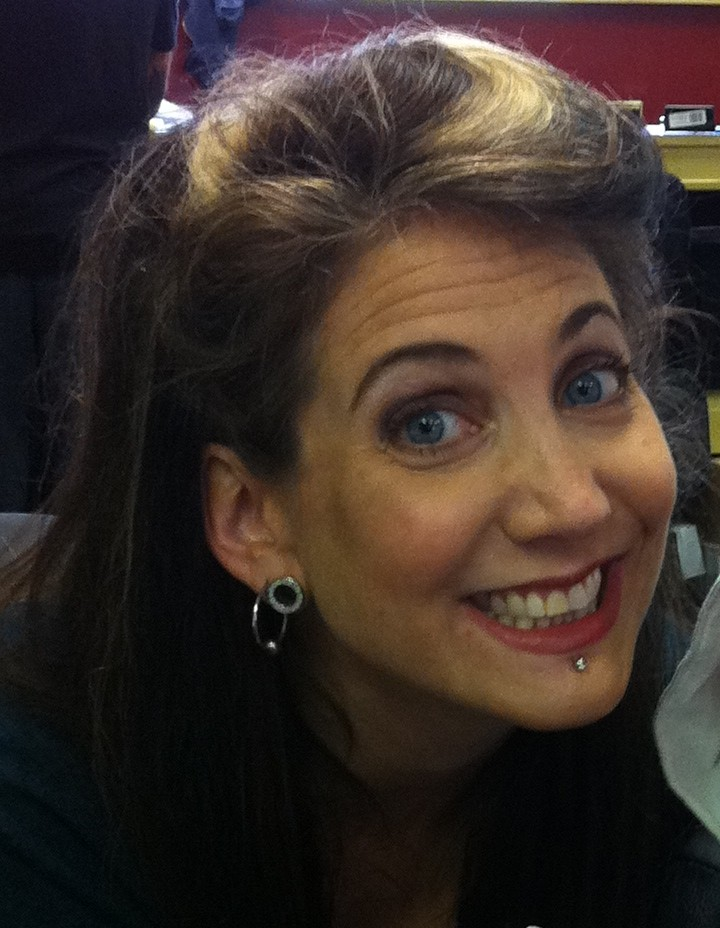
- Born: December 20, 1966 (age 59); Ann Arbor, Michigan, U.S.
- Occupations: Tattoo artist; television personality
- Spouse: Scott White
- Relatives: Guy Aitchison (brother)
- Website: www.curiosityshoptattoo.com

Hannah Aitchison (born December 20, 1966) is an American tattoo artist. She is best known for her appearances on tattoo reality television shows LA Ink and Best Ink.

== Biography ==
Hannah Aitchison was born on December 20, 1966, and is originally from Ann Arbor, Michigan. She was based in Chicago, Illinois at Deluxe Tattoo for many years, but relocated to Pittsburgh, Pennsylvania to tattoo in her studio, Curiosity Shop, where she works in various mediums and curates a collection of antiques and oddities. She continues to travel the world, working at tattoo conventions and artist collectives, among others. She is well known for her appearance on Seasons 1-3 of the TLC reality television show LA Ink. and 3 Seasons as a Judge on Best Ink (Oxygen). She also studied classical singing and is an expert knitter.

Aitchison contributed quotes to Girls Against Girls by author Bonnie Burton.

Aitchison is the sister of tattoo artist, Guy Aitchison.

== Filmography ==
=== Television ===
| Year | Title | Notes |
|---|---|---|
| 2007 | Tattoo Wars | 1 episode |
| 2008 | Last Call with Carson Daly | 1 episode |
| 2007–2009 | LA Ink | 18 episodes |
| 2013–2014 | Best Ink | 15 episodes |
