= Best Ink =

- Genre: Reality competition
- Presented by: Pete Wentz (seasons 2–3); Kimberly Caldwell (season 1)
- Judges: Joe Capobianco; Sabina Kelley; Hannah Aitchison
- Country of origin: United States
- Original language: English
- No. of seasons: 3
- No. of episodes: 30

Production
- Executive producers: Jonathan Murray; Gil Goldschein; Rick DeOliveira; Erin Cristall; Lisa Fletcher; Zach Kozek
- Running time: 42 minutes
- Production company: Bunim/Murray Productions

Original release
- Network: Oxygen
- Release: March 27, 2012 – February 26, 2014

Best Ink is an American reality competition series on Oxygen that judges tattoo artists. The series ran for three seasons, the first in 2012, the second in 2013, and the third in 2013–2014. The show was hosted by Kimberly Caldwell during Season 1 and by Pete Wentz in Seasons 2 and 3.

Best Ink premiered on March 27, 2012. The second season debuted on April 3, 2013. The third season debuted on December 4, 2013.

== Cast ==
- Hannah Aitchison – Judge
- Kimberly Caldwell – Host (season 1)
- Joe Capobianco – Judge
- Sabina Kelley – Judge
- Pete Wentz – Host (seasons 2–3)

== Format ==
A group of tattoo artists from around the United States compete in various tattooing challenges. The winner of the competition wins a $100,000 cash prize and a cover article in a well-known tattoo-related magazine. After each challenge, tattoo artist and the show's judges, along with a different guest judge every week, critique the tattoos to find the contestant with the "Best Ink".

=== Flash challenge ===
Typically a non-tattooing task that tests the contestants' artistic skills using different media, subjects and "canvases." Usually the skills tested in the Flash Challenge will be a compulsory judging factor in the Elimination Tattoo.

=== Elimination tattoo ===
This stage starts with the winner of the Flash Challenge getting a privilege in this second stage. These perks can be first/only choice of which "skin" (client) they would like to tattoo or extra time, but is predetermined by the show's production team. Once each "skin" is allocated to a contestant, a consultation period between artist and "skin" is given (typically in a set amount of time) and followed by chance to create the artwork overnight before tattooing the next day. The Elimination tattoos are performed simultaneously by all contestants and within a set amount of time. The judges then critique the work, choosing the best and worst tattoos of the week. The contestant that produces the worst tattoo is eliminated from the show until the final episode where one tattoo artist is judged the winner.

== Contestants ==
=== Season 1 ===
- Alexis Kovacs
- Christina "Charlie" Petty
- Jessica Rotwein
- Jon Mesa
- Kyle Giffen
- Brittan "London" Reese
- Meghan Pagliaroni
- Nicky Hennerez
- Roman Abrego
- Tiffany Perez

=== Season 2 ===
- Alli Baker
- Brittany Elliott
- Carolyn “Cadaver” McKnight
- Derek Rubright
- DJ Tambe
- Jerod Ray
- Jordan "Dollarz" Ginsberg
- Kelly McEvoy
- Melvin Todd
- Ralph Giordano
- Teresa Sharpe
- Tylor Schwarz

=== Season 3 ===
- Alayna Magnan
- Amy Zager
- Anthony Zamora
- Carey Matthews
- Danny Lepore
- Darnell Waine
- Izzi Echo
- Joseph Matisa
- Karly Cleary
- Amy "May May" Yaeger
- Romeo Lacoste
- Rudy Hetzer
- Willy Cutlip
- Lara Slater

== Contestant progress ==
=== Season 1 ===
Contestant	1	2	3	4	5	6	7	8
Flash Challenge; Winner	Charlie	Roman	Kyle	Alexis	Alexis	Charlie	London	N/A
London	WIN	IN	IN	LOW	LOW	LOW	WIN	WINNER
Alexis	IN	HIGH	IN	WIN	HIGH	HIGH	IN	RUNNER-UP
Jon	HIGH	IN	BTM2	LOW	WIN	WIN	BTM2	3RD PLACE
Charlie	IN	IN	WIN	IN	BTM2	BTM2	OUT	
Nicky	IN	LOW	IN	IN	IN	OUT		
Kyle	IN	BTM2	IN	BTM2	OUT			
Jessica	LOW	LOW	LOW	OUT				
Roman	IN	WIN	OUT					
Meghan	BTM2	OUT						
Tiffany	OUT							

(WINNER) The contestant won Best Ink.
(RUNNER-UP) The contestant was the Runner-Up.
(3RD PLACE) The contestant was in 3rd Place.
(WIN) The contestant won best tattoo of the week.
(HIGH) The contestant had one of the best tattoos of the week, but did not win.
(IN) The contestant was safe.
(LOW) The contestant had one of the best tattoos of the week, but was voted into the bottom.
(LOW) The contestant had one of the worst tattoos of the week, but was the first to be called safe.
(BTM2) The contestant had one of the worst tattoos of the week and was the last to be called safe.
(OUT) The contestant was eliminated from the competition.

=== Season 2 ===
Contestant	1	2	3	4	5	6	7	8	9	10
Flash Challenge; Winner	Melvin	Jerod	DJ	Dollarz	Tylor	Jerod	Teresa	DJ	Jerod	N/A
Teresa	HIGH	IN	WIN	HIGH	WIN	HIGH	HIGH	IN	BTM2	WINNER
DJ	WIN	IN	IN	WIN	HIGH	HIGH	WIN	HIGH	WIN	RUNNER-UP
Jerod	IN	HIGH	LOW	BTM2	HIGH	LOW	IN	WIN	WIN	3RD PLACE
Alli	IN	IN	IN	HIGH	IN	IN	BTM2	BTM2	OUT	
Brittany	IN	WIN	IN	IN	BTM2	WIN	IN	OUT		
Derek	HIGH	IN	HIGH	LOW	LOW	BTM2	OUT			
Tylor	IN	HIGH	IN	IN	IN	OUT				
Ralph	IN	IN	HIGH	IN	OUT					
Dollarz	IN	LOW	BTM2	OUT						
Kelly	BTM2	BTM2	OUT							
Melvin	LOW	OUT								
Carolyn	OUT									

Bold The contestant won immunity the previous week and was automatically safe the preceding week.

(WINNER) The contestant won Best Ink.
(RUNNER-UP) The contestant was the runner-up.
(3RD PLACE) The contestant was in 3rd Place.
(WIN) The contestant won best tattoo of the week, and received automatic immunity for the next week's Ink Challenge.
(WIN) The contestant won best tattoo of the week, but did not receive automatic immunity for the next week's Ink Challenge.
(HIGH) The contestant had one of the best tattoos of the week, but did not win.
(IN) The contestant was safe.
(LOW) The contestant had one of the worst tattoos of the week, but was the first to be called safe.
(BTM2) The contestant had one of the worst tattoos of the week and was the last to be called safe.
(OUT) The contestant was eliminated from the competition.

=== Season 3 ===
Contestant	1	2	3	4	5	6	7	8	9	10	11	12
Flash Challenge; Winner	Amy	May; May	Willy	Darnell	Joe	Danny	Darnell	Karly	Alayna	Karly	Darnell	N/A
Karly	WIN	IN	IN	HIGH	IN	IN	WIN	WIN	IN	BTM2	WIN	WINNER
Darnell	HIGH	IN	IN	WIN	IN	IN	HIGH	IN	WIN	HIGH	BTM2	RUNNER-UP
Alayna	IN	IN	IN	LOW	WIN	IN	HIGH	HIGH	HIGH	IN	WIN	3RD PLACE
Willy	IN	WIN	HIGH	IN	HIGH	HIGH	LOW	HIGH	IN	WIN	OUT	
Lara	LOW	IN	IN	IN	IN	HIGH	BTM2	LOW	BTM2	OUT		
Joe	IN	HIGH	WIN	HIGH	HIGH	WIN	LOW	BTM2	OUT			
Romeo	IN	IN	IN	IN	IN	BTM2	HIGH	OUT				
Danny	IN	IN	IN	BTM2	BTM2	LOW	OUT					
May May	HIGH	LOW	LOW	IN	LOW	OUT						
Anthony	IN	BTM2	IN	IN	OUT							
Amy	IN	HIGH	BTM2	OUT								
Izzi	BTM2	IN	OUT									
Rudy	IN	OUT										
Carey	OUT											

Bold The contestant won immunity the previous week and was automatically safe the preceding week.

(WINNER) The contestant won Best Ink.
(RUNNER-UP) The contestant was the runner-up.
(3RD PLACE) The contestant was in 3rd Place.
(WIN) The contestant won best tattoo of the week, and received automatic immunity for the next week's Ink Challenge.
(WIN) The contestant won best tattoo of the week, but did not receive automatic immunity for the next week's Ink Challenge.
(HIGH) The contestant had one of the best tattoos of the week, but did not win.
(IN) The contestant was safe.
(LOW) The contestant had one of the worst tattoos of the week, but was the first to be called safe.
(BTM2) The contestant had one of the worst tattoos of the week and was the last to be called safe.
(OUT) The contestant was eliminated from the competition.

- ^Note 1: Joe was originally supposed to be in the bottom 3, but since he had won the Ink Challenge the previous week he was automatically safe.

== Episodes ==
=== Series overview ===
Season	Episodes	Originally released	
Season	Episodes	First released	Last released
1	8	March 27, 2012	May 15, 2012
2	10	April 3, 2013	June 5, 2013
3	12	December 4, 2013	February 26, 2014

=== Season 1 (2012) ===
No. overall	No. in season	Title	Original release date	U.S. viewers (millions)
1	1	"Something to Hide"	March 27, 2012	0.46
2	2	"Pin-up Showdown"	April 3, 2012	0.33
3	3	"Emotional Skin-Pact"	April 10, 2012	0.36
4	4	"Tattoo Virgins"	April 17, 2012	0.31
5	5	"Face Off"	April 24, 2012	0.53
6	6	"Purrfect Ink"	May 1, 2012	0.52
7	7	"The King of Ink"	May 8, 2012	0.44
8	8	"For the Love of Ink"	May 15, 2012	0.44

=== Season 2 (2013) ===
No. overall	No. in season	Title	Original release date	U.S. viewers (millions)
9	1	"Bigger and Badder"	April 3, 2013	0.49
10	2	"I've Got a Secret"	April 10, 2013	0.33
11	3	"A Family Affair"	April 17, 2013	0.49
12	4	"Live Out Loud"	April 24, 2013	0.38
13	5	"A Good Laugh"	May 1, 2013	0.35
14	6	"I'm Sexy and I Know It"	May 8, 2013	0.44
15	7	"Brand New Life"	May 15, 2013	0.58
16	8	"Be Ready For Anything"	May 22, 2013	0.51
17	9	"True Love"	May 29, 2013	0.37
18	10	"Full Body of Work"	June 5, 2013	N/A

=== Season 3 (2013–14) ===
No. overall	No. in season	Title	Original release date	U.S. viewers (millions)
19	1	"The Seven Deadly Sins"	December 4, 2013	N/A
20	2	"Playing Dirty"	December 11, 2013	N/A
21	3	"Fight Club"	December 18, 2013	N/A
22	4	"Pain in the Ribs"	January 1, 2014	N/A
23	5	"Quittin' Time"	January 8, 2014	N/A
24	6	"Science Friction"	January 15, 2014	0.35
25	7	"Man and the Machine"	January 22, 2014	N/A
26	8	"Life's a Beach"	January 29, 2014	N/A
27	9	"Sexy Pin-ups"	February 5, 2014	N/A
28	10	"Shock and Awe"	February 12, 2014	N/A
29	11	"Crash and Burn"	February 19, 2014	0.56
30	12	"The $100,000 Tattoo"	February 26, 2014	N/A

== See also ==
- List of tattoo TV shows
