= Black Ink Crew: Chicago season 4 =

Black Ink Crew: Chicago
- Season 4
- Cover used by the iTunes Store
- Starring: Ryan Henry; Charmaine Walker; Phor Brumfield; Don Brumfield; Danielle Jamison; Van Johnson; Liliana Barrios
- No. of episodes: 16

Release
- Original network: VH1
- Original release: May 30 – September 19, 2018

Season chronology
- ← Previous; Season 3 Next → Season 5

The fourth season of the reality television series Black Ink Crew: Chicago aired on VH1 from May 30, 2018 until September 19, 2018. It chronicles the daily operations and staff drama at an African American owned and operated tattoo shop 9MAG located in Chicago, Illinois.

== Main cast ==
- Ryan Henry
- Charmaine Walker
- Phor Brumfield
- Don Brumfield
- Danielle Jamison
- Van Johnson
- Liliana Barrios

== Recurring cast ==
- Ashley P
- Cobra Kat
- JR Diaz
- Nikki
- Rachel
- Jenn
- Terrence
- Reese
- Bella
- Neekbey
- Slam

== Episodes ==
No. overall	No. in season	Title	Original release date	US viewers (millions)
39	1	"The Takeover Begins"	May 30, 2018	1.15
After Kat's banishment, Ryan has disappeared. 9 Mag grapples with the new status quo. Phor plays the biggest show of his rap career. A snapchat video finally makes Ashley leave Don. Van tries to keep his temper in check.
40	2	"9Mag Is Dead"	June 6, 2018	1.01
Ryan questions his decision to leave 9Mag while Van tries to save the shop. Ashley comes face to face with Don's side piece. Lily has to contend with her past. Danielle returns to Chicago with news. Phor gets an opportunity.
41	3	"Tom, Dick, and Cobra"	June 13, 2018	1.10
Ryan surprises Rachel with his new venture. Van debuts his side hustle for the city of Chicago. Ashley contemplates taking the kids to Texas to clear her head, leaving Don behind to fight for his family.
42	4	"A Whole New Squad"	June 20, 2018	1.07
While the 9MAG crew is at a loss, Lily makes moves to bring the shop back from the dead. Charmaine blind-sides Danielle with details of Terrence's hookup. Van is shook about his baby girl's new boyfriend.
43	5	"New Lease, New Reese"	June 27, 2018	1.08
Ryan starts a new shop but faces a learning curve when bringing in a new staff. Lily hires a new artist, which does not fly with Charmaine, who brought Danielle back to the shop. Nikki throws Phor a surprise party.
44	6	"The H.B.I.C."	July 11, 2018	1.10
Charmaine makes a power grab for Loyal Ink, dividing the crew even further. Don faces huge repercussions after getting arrested for a DUI. Dani and Terrence's relationship continues to heat up.
45	7	"White Tacticals"	July 18, 2018	1.03
Charmaine establishes the rules as she continues as H.B.I.C., causing Lily and Reese to rebel. Ryan reveals a long-awaited Mother's Day surprise for Rachel. Van has a big blow up with Jenn.
46	8	"Do The Hussle"	July 25, 2018	1.09
Phor gets a second chance to pursue his dream. A family crisis brings Don and Ashley back together. Lily and Charmaine's fight reaches a fiery end. A male stripper bares all during the Loyal Ink grand opening.
47	9	"Barbie Tingz"	August 1, 2018	0.96
Phor leaves it all behind in Chicago to finally pursue his music dreams in LA. Ryan joins him with plans for a pop-up shop and to rebuild the 9Mag brand. Cobra and Reese go head to head over Phor's booth.
48	10	"All Phor One"	August 8, 2018	1.03
Phor arrives in Jamaica with the 9MAG crew for a performance of a lifetime. Loyal Ink's plan to surprise him fails when they bring too much of their Chicago baggage with them.
49	11	"The Last Supper"	August 15, 2018	1.21
9Mag and Loyal Ink's trip to Jamaica takes a turn for the worse. Phor's dream of being on stage in Jamaica is deferred. Don has something special planned for Ashley to win her back. 9Mag and Loyal Ink finally come face to face.
50	12	"Reese, Scheduled"	August 22, 2018	1.03
Neek returns from Africa, and Charmaine uses her best assets to bind them together forever. Don returns to his male stripper days. Cobra discovers a dirty secret about Reese's past and questions her artistic integrity.
51	13	"Neek and You Shall Find"	August 29, 2018	1.10
With construction behind schedule, Ryan hires a powerhouse manager to get 9MAG back in business. Charmaine makes a catastrophic first impression on Neek's mother. Junior's girlfriend stirs up trouble at Loyal Ink.
52	14	"One Time At Adult Camp"	September 5, 2018	0.92
The Loyal Ink crew tries to regain the trust of Lily and Reese by taking them on a team-building trip at an adult campground in the middle of the woods. Tensions ignite at the camp's foam party and Ashley finally unloads.
53	15	"I'm the New You"	September 12, 2018	1.00
After quitting Loyal Ink, Lily decides to make other moves. Cobra takes on a new hobby of becoming a luchador. after Phor hits a breaking point in LA, he looks to Ryan for some ink therapy. Charmaine and Ryan come face to face.
54	16	"Welcome to 9Mag...Again!"	September 19, 2018	1.13
Ryan makes a shocking move that will have serious consequences for 9Mag and Loyal Ink. Phor struggles to keep both his music career and relationship afloat. A furious Don makes an announcement that will change the direction of Loyal Ink forever.
