= Bad Ink =

- Genre: Reality
- Starring: Dirk Vermin; Rob Ruckus
- Country of origin: United States
- Original language: English
- No. of seasons: 2
- No. of episodes: 24

Production
- Executive producers: Dan Adler; Evan Lerner; Larry Hochberg; Lily Neumeyer; Matt Sharp
- Running time: 22 minutes
- Production company: Sharp Entertainment

Original release
- Network: A&E
- Release: August 11, 2013 – August 20, 2014

Bad Ink is an American reality television series that premiered on August 11, 2013, on A&E. The series follows tattoo artist and musician Dirk Vermin, owner of Pussykat Tattoo off the Las Vegas Strip, and his friend and bandmate Rob Ruckus as they seek out bad tattoos and, for some, transform them with skilled cover-up work. Season 2 premiered on January 20, 2014.

== Episodes ==
=== Series overview ===
| Season | Episodes | Originally released | |
| Season | Episodes | First released | Last released |
|---|---|---|---|
| 1 | 14 | August 11, 2013 | October 16, 2013 |
| 2 | 10 | January 20, 2014 | August 20, 2014 |

=== Season 1 (2013) ===
| No. overall | No. in season | Title | Original release date | Production code | U.S. viewers (millions) |
|---|---|---|---|---|---|
| 1 | 1 | "A Damsel and a Nerd in Need" | August 11, 2013 | 100 | 1.57 |
| 2 | 2 | "Monkey Business" | August 11, 2013 | 101 | 1.38 |
| 3 | 3 | "Terrible Tattoo Showdown" | August 18, 2013 | 106 | 1.62 |
| 4 | 4 | "Who Needs a Tattervention?" | August 18, 2013 | 103 | 1.36 |
| 5 | 5 | "When Animal Tattoos Attack" | August 25, 2013 | 104 | 1.16 |
| 6 | 6 | "Tattoo Crimes and Misdemeanors" | August 25, 2013 | 105 | 1.01 |
| 7 | 7 | "All is Fair in Love and Ink" | September 8, 2013 | 108 | 1.34 |
| 8 | 8 | "Baby Mama Tattoo Drama" | September 8, 2013 | 107 | 1.27 |
| 9 | 9 | "The Family that Inks Together..." | September 15, 2013 | 109 | 1.24 |
| 10 | 10 | "Tramp Stamps Gone Wild" | September 15, 2013 | 102 | 1.24 |
| 11 | 11 | "Girls Gone Tattoo Wild" | September 18, 2013 | 111 | 4.06 |
| 12 | 12 | "Show Me Your Tats" | October 2, 2013 | 110 | 3.68 |
| 13 | 13 | "Close Encounters of the Butt Kind" | October 9, 2013 | 112 | 3.00 |
| 14 | 14 | "Model Misbehavior" | October 16, 2013 | 113 | 3.22 |

=== Season 2 (2014) ===
| No. overall | No. in season | Title | Original release date | Production code | U.S. viewers (millions) |
|---|---|---|---|---|---|
| 15 | 1 | "Turning the Other Butt Cheek" | January 20, 2014 | 201 | 1.44 |
| 16 | 2 | "Lost in Tattoo Translation" | January 20, 2014 | 202 | 1.29 |
| 17 | 3 | "Babes in Tattooland" | January 27, 2014 | 203 | 1.13 |
| 18 | 4 | "Tat's My Mom" | January 27, 2014 | 204 | 1.04 |
| 19 | 5 | "Last Man Stamping" | February 3, 2014 | 206 | 1.01 |
| 20 | 6 | "Tat in the Hat" | February 3, 2014 | 205 | 0.94 |
| 21 | 7 | "Oops, I Tatted Again" | February 10, 2014 | 207 | 1.07 |
| 22 | 8 | "Tat-Too Hot for TV" | February 17, 2014 | 208 | 1.08 |
| 23 | 9 | "Tat's Ink-redible!" | February 24, 2014 | 209 | 1.06 |
| 24 | 10 | "It Takes Two to Tattoo" | August 20, 2014 | 210 | 0.83 |

== See also ==
- List of television shows set in Las Vegas
- List of tattoo TV shows
- The Vermin – Vermin and Ruckus' band
