= Corey Miller (tattoo artist) =

American tattoo artist (born 1967)

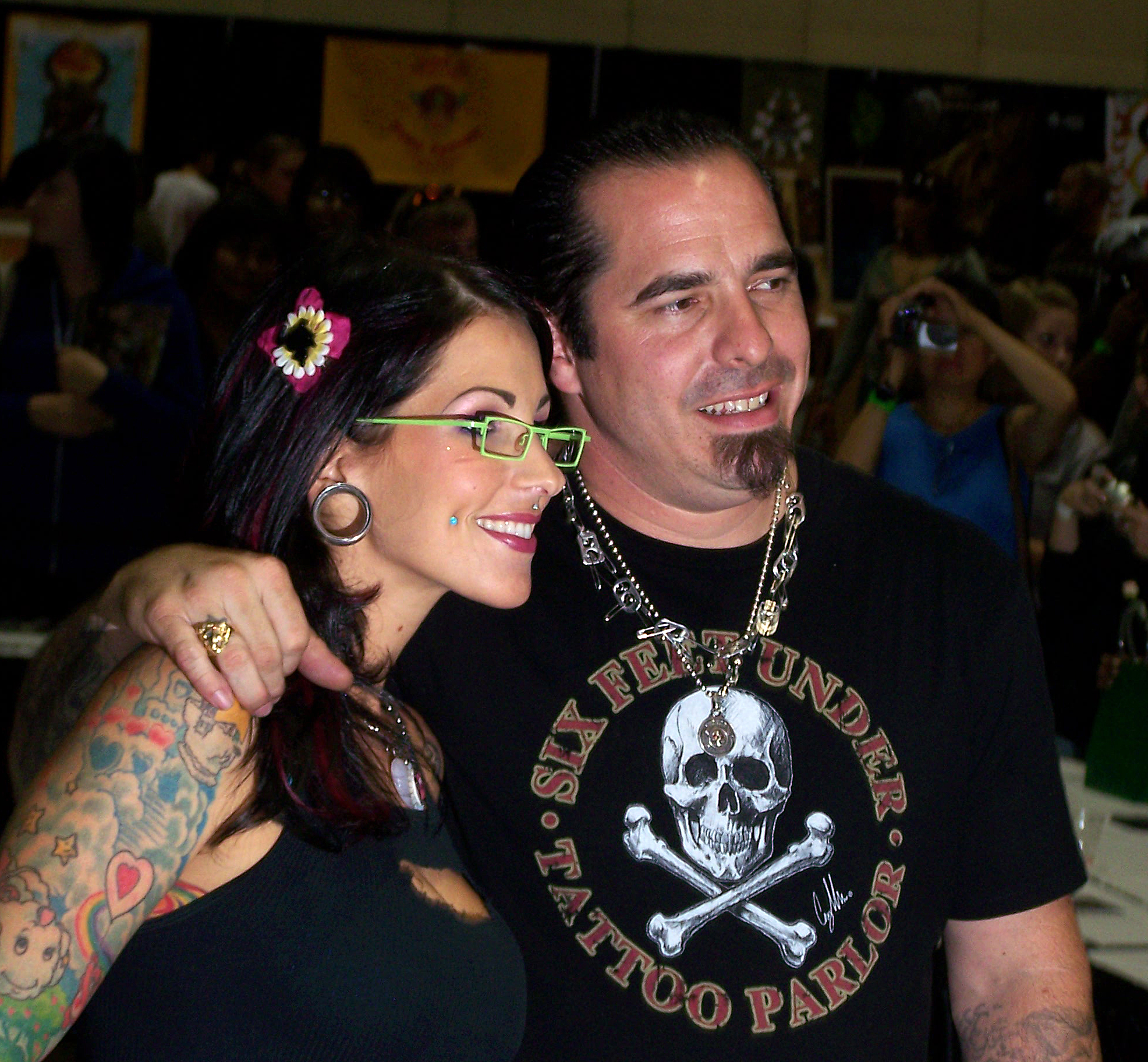
- Miller with Pixie Acia in 2007
- Born: March 13, 1967 (age 58); United States
- Occupation(s): Tattoo artist, television personality
- Spouse: Katherine Miller

Corey Miller (born March 13, 1967) is an American tattoo artist and television personality. He began tattooing at the age of 15. He is the owner of a tattoo shop in Upland, California called Six Feet Under. He was one of the core tattoo artists on the reality television show LA Ink.

Miller specializes in black and gray portraits and dragon art. This tattoo form is greatly influenced by traditional and classic styles. He is also known for his freehand work and his talent for drawing directly on the skin without any stencils. His clients have included celebrities, such as James Hetfield from the band Metallica, Jason Giambi, former Dream Theater member Mike Portnoy and Jesse James. Aside from creating art, Miller also plays the drums for his band, PowerFlex 5. Ludwig Drums released a new drum set in 2009 with Miller's flash designs.

== See also ==
- List of tattoo artists
