= Black Ink Crew: Chicago season 6 =

Black Ink Crew: Chicago
- Season 6
- Cover used by the iTunes Store
- Starring: Ryan Henry; Charmaine Walker; Jessica Simpson; Phor Brumfield; Don Brumfield
- No. of episodes: 16

Release
- Original network: VH1
- Original release: December 4, 2019 – July 27, 2020

Season chronology
- ← Previous; Season 5 Next → Season 7

The sixth season of the reality television series Black Ink Crew: Chicago aired on VH1 from December 4, 2019 until July 27, 2020. It chronicles the daily operations and staff drama at an African American owned and operated tattoo shop 9MAG located in Chicago, Illinois.

== Main cast ==
- Ryan Henry
- Charmaine Walker
- Jessica Simpson
- Phor Brumfield
- Don Brumfield

== Recurring cast ==
- Ashley P
- Rachel
- NeekBey
- Brittney Slam
- Gina
- Draya
- Prince
- Fly Tatted
- Plug
- Zach
- Miss Kitty
- Danielle Jamison
- Bella
- Katrina Jackson
- Van Johnson
- Briana Johnson
- Lily
- Star
- King JaBri
- Nelly
- Steven

== Episodes ==
No. overall	No. in season	Title	Original release date	US viewers (millions)
75	1	"The Future is Female"	December 4, 2019	0.72
After being let go from 9MAG, Charmaine bounces back with a shop of her own, with London's hottest black female tattoo artist by her side. Ryan's business excels as his personal life struggles. Don and Ashley get unexpected news.
76	2	"Proper Excited"	December 4, 2019	0.74
Zach brokers a deal with Draya in exchange for a date, they flirt with the idea of starting a shop romance. Charmaine and Neek plan for their future together and share some news with their moms. Ryan opens up about some family issues in therapy.
77	3	"World's Best Dad!"	December 11, 2019	0.60
Charmaine announces her pregnancy to the 2nd City crew and tries to appease her mother-in-law. Jess announces a pajama party at her house and gets a dose of reality with Chicago life. Ryan is confronted by Rachel. Zach and Draya go on a sexy date.
78	4	"Second City, Welcome Kitty"	December 18, 2019	0.59
Ryan moves up and moves on with a rumored fling visiting from out of town. Don’s plan to help Phor and Ryan find love in the club goes left when Ashley crashes the party with her single friends. Zach's arrogance pushes Fly to his breaking point.
79	5	"My Big Fat Neek Wedding"	January 1, 2020	0.58
After a fight between her artists, Charmaine starts to see the cracks in 2nd City Ink. Don helps Phor deal with a potential bombshell while the tension between Charmaine and Ryan comes to a head when one of her artists considers switching teams.
80	6	"Glenda"	January 8, 2020	0.75
Phor meets his maybe-teenage-baby for the first time while Ryan realizes he is responsible for the broken relationships with the women around him. Charmaine is devastated by the news of her mother Glenda's passing.
81	7	"It’s So Hard to Say Goodbye"	January 15, 2020	0.74
As Charmaine prepares for her mother's funeral, concerns grow for her Dad. The 2nd City crew and Ryan head to New Orleans for the burial but Don and Phor are not invited. Prince brokers a truce with his ex. Phor spends time with his alleged daughter.
82	8	"The Itty Bitty Kitty Committee"	January 22, 2020	0.63
The gang turns up on Bourbon Street in the spirit of Glenda. Kitty considers Charmaine's job offer, but Jess is left in the dark. Don helps Phor get answers about his potential daughter while Prince makes a tough decision.
83	9	"Some People Like Cake, Some People Do Not Like Cake"	January 29, 2020	0.65
Kitty lands in Chicago with a splash, making waves with the 2nd City crew. Tensions reach a boiling point when Jess confronts Char about Kitty's role at 2nd City. Ashley finally takes her marital matters into her own hands.
84	10	"Don's Latest Snapchat Video"	February 5, 2020	0.69
Ashley reveals the real reason she left Don. Jess flies back to London. Fly drops off Prince at the courthouse to turn himself in. Charmaine finds out the gender of her baby. The Chicago Tribune article drops and Van pops up to talk to Charmaine.
85	11	"Hot Off the Presses"	February 12, 2020	0.68
After an incriminating article puts 2nd City on blast, Charmaine and Kitty do damage control with their artists by burying the lede. As news travels quickly, the truth about the article threatens to ruin Charmaine's lavish NYC baby shower.
86	12	"Rumor Had It"	February 19, 2020	0.64
The future of 2nd City is in jeopardy while Charmaine attempts to secure the proper documents to legalize the shop. Ryan is forced to make some decisions about his love life. 9MAG and Charmaine come face to face again after their falling out.
87	13	"Chicago Ain’t That Big"	July 6, 2020	0.58
When a romantic video of Ryan and Rachel vacationing in Mexico shows up on social media, a jilted Kitty bares her claws. Former Chicago Bull Eddy Curry gets a memorial tattoo. 2nd City Ink hosts an open call to expand the team.
88	14	"Mucus Still Plugged"	July 13, 2020	0.55
Char's false alarm forces her into early maternity leave. Kitty's determined to prove to Char that she can handle the shop in her absence. Over at 9MAG, Draya and Phor forge on to keep the tattoo community unified while tensions at 2nd City rise.
89	15	"Other Side of the Pond"	July 20, 2020	0.54
Char struggles to find balance between the shop and maternity. Back at the shop, Kitty's caught off guard by Jess' surprise to elevate things at 2nd City. At 9MAG, Ryan and Rachel finally come to terms with their relationship
90	16	"The Shutdown"	July 27, 2020	0.52
As Ryan tries to keep the morale of 9MAG high, the future of 2nd City lies in the balance as coronavirus makes its rounds in Chicago. Jess and Steven jet back to London. Don and Ashley are forced to make decisions on the future of their marriage. Charmaine prepares for the delivery of her baby girl Nola.
