= Black Ink Crew: Los Angeles =

American reality TV series (2019–23)

- Genre: Reality
- Starring: Danny Kirkpatrick; Lemeir Mitchell; Nessie Blaze; Christian Thomas; Vudu Dahl; Tim Simmons; Erica Thompson; Katrina Jackson; Alana; Kevin Laroy; Nelly Vinteren; Polo
- Opening theme: "I Do What I Want"
- Composer: iAMCompton
- Country of origin: United States
- Original language: English
- No. of seasons: 2
- No. of episodes: 32

Production
- Executive producers: Dan Cesareo; Doug DePriest; David Wolfgang; Ken Martinez; Kari Mcfarland; Rick Hankey; Davis Reidpath; Daniel Blau Rogge; Ceaser Emanuel; Maricarmen Lopez; Treiva Williams; Phakiso Collins
- Running time: 42–46 minutes
- Production companies: Big Fish Entertainment (2019); MTV Entertainment Studios (2022–2023)

Original release
- Network: VH1
- Release: August 14, 2019 – July 17, 2023

Related
- Black Ink Crew; Black Ink Crew: Chicago

Black Ink Crew: Los Angeles (formerly titled Black Ink Crew: Compton) is an American reality television series that premiered on VH1 on August 14, 2019. It is the Compton-based spin-off of Black Ink Crew. It chronicles the daily operations and staff drama at an African American owned and operated tattoo shop, IAM Compton, located in Compton, California.

On May 8, 2023, VH1 announced that additional episodes of the second season would air from May 15, 2023, alongside the series rebrand to Black Ink Crew: Los Angeles.

== Cast ==
=== Timeline of cast members ===
Main cast members
| Cast Member | Seasons | | |
| Cast Member | 1 | 2A | 2B |
|---|---|---|---|
| KP | Main | Main | Main |
| LeMeir Mitchell | Main | Main | Main |
| Vudu Dahl | Main | Main | Guest |
| Ink Drippin' | Main | Main | Supporting |
| Nessie Blaze | Main | Main | Main |
| Tim Simmons | Main | Main | Main |
| Barbie | Main | Main | Supporting |
| Alana Marie | Supporting | Supporting | Main |
| Cory SaintClair | Guest (Note: Appears as recurring guest star.) | Supporting | Main |
| Polo | | Supporting | Main |
| Mz. Ink Bomb | | Guest (Note: Appears as recurring guest star.) | Main |
| Amber Gonzalez | | Guest (Note: Appears as recurring guest star.) | Main |
| Katrina Jackson | | Supporting (Note: Added to the show from episode nine onwards.) | Main |
| Kevin Laroy | | Guest (Note: Appears as recurring guest star.) | Main |
| Nelly Vinteren | | Guest (Note: Appears as recurring guest star.) | Main |
| Bookie Thompson | | Guest (Note: Appears as recurring guest star.) | Main |
| Deshay Jones | | Guest (Note: Appears as recurring guest star.) | Main |
Supporting cast members
| Kyla Pratt | Supporting | | |
| Danielle Emani | Supporting | Supporting | Supporting |
| Armani | | Supporting | Supporting |
| Star Divine | | Supporting | |
| Denai Marie | | | Supporting |

=== Main ===
IAM Compton

- KP (born Danny Kirkpatrick), the owner of InkArtMusic (IAM) Compton, a tattoo artist and a rapper
- Vudu Dahl, a tattoo apprentice at IAM Compton
- Ink Drippin' (born Christian Thomas), a tattoo artist at IAM Compton
- Tim Simmons, KP's cousin and the shop manager at IAM Compton
- Alana, a tattoo artist at IAM Compton
- Cory, lead artist at IAM Compton
- Polo, apprentice at IAM Compton
- Mz. Ink Bomb, a tattoo artist at IAM Compton
- Amber Gonzalez, permanent make-up artist at IAM Compton

Enigma

- Katrina Jackson, tattoo artist & owner of Enigma
- LeMeir Mitchell, tattoo artist at Enigma, formerly employed at IAM Compton
- Nessie Blaze, former tattoo artist at Enigma, formerly employed at IAM Compton
- Barbie (born Erica Thompson), shop manager at Enigma, formerly employed as shop receptionist at IAM Compton
- Kevin Laroy, tattoo artist at Enigma, appeared on seasons 5-7 & 10 of Black Ink Crew
- Nelly Vinteren, tattoo artist at Enigma
- Bookie Thompson, tattoo artist at Enigma
- Deshay Jones, tattoo artist at Enigma

=== Supporting cast members ===
- Kyla Pratt, KP's girlfriend, an actress and silent partner in his business
- Danielle Emani, Lemeir's girlfriend and high school sweetheart, a business partner in his food truck business
- Star Divine, KP's former business partner and shop manager of IAM Compton
- Denai, co-manager at Enigma

== Episodes ==
=== Series overview ===
| Season | Episodes | | Originally released | |
| Season | Episodes | | First released | Last released |
|---|---|---|---|---|
| 1 | 10 | | August 14, 2019 | October 16, 2019 |
| 2 | 22 | 12 | February 21, 2022 | May 9, 2022 |
| 2 | 22 | 10 | May 15, 2023 | July 17, 2023 |

=== Season 1 (2019) ===
| No. overall | No. in season | Title | Original release date | U.S. viewers (millions) |
|---|---|---|---|---|
| 1 | 1 | "The Marathon Begins" | August 14, 2019 | 0.94 |
| 2 | 2 | "The Era of Hope" | August 21, 2019 | 0.78 |
| 3 | 3 | "Opening Up" | August 28, 2019 | 0.65 |
| 4 | 4 | "Cheers, Cheers to Three Musketeers" | September 4, 2019 | 0.69 |
| 5 | 5 | "The Naked Truth" | September 11, 2019 | 0.59 |
| 6 | 6 | "Big Bear, Oh My!" | September 18, 2019 | 0.73 |
| 7 | 7 | "Big Bear Jail" | September 25, 2019 | 0.64 |
| 8 | 8 | "Granny Off Her Rocker" | October 2, 2019 | 0.68 |
| 9 | 9 | "Yahwea or the Highway" | October 9, 2019 | 0.69 |
| 10 | 10 | "You Can't Run From The Devil" | October 16, 2019 | 0.73 |

=== Season 2 (2022–23) ===
| No. overall | No. in season | Title | Original release date | U.S. viewers (millions) |
|---|---|---|---|---|
| 11 | 1 | "You're Not Compton By Yourself" | February 21, 2022 | 0.35 |
| 12 | 2 | "Day of Reckoning" | February 28, 2022 | 0.28 |
| 13 | 3 | "All Will Bee Revealed" | March 7, 2022 | 0.23 |
| 14 | 4 | "From Compton to the Vatican" | March 14, 2022 | 0.19 |
| 15 | 5 | "Hanging With the Opps" | March 21, 2022 | 0.19 |
| 16 | 6 | "The Compton Ultimatum" | March 28, 2022 | 0.18 |
| 17 | 7 | "Barbie Picks at Her Bone" | April 4, 2022 | 0.21 |
| 18 | 8 | "The Lost Season" | April 11, 2022 | 0.26 |
| 19 | 9 | "New Teams, Same Dreams" | April 18, 2022 | 0.22 |
| 20 | 10 | "Birthday Dahl" | April 25, 2022 | 0.17 |
| 21 | 11 | "It's Tattoo Taco Tuesday!" | May 2, 2022 | 0.18 |
| 22 | 12 | "Black Ink Crewtopia" | May 9, 2022 | 0.17 |
Part 2
| 23 | 13 | "A Tale of Tattoo Cities" | May 15, 2023 | 0.16 |
| 24 | 14 | "Face the Music" | May 22, 2023 | 0.11 |
| 25 | 15 | "Tattooing With the Enemy" | May 29, 2023 | 0.15 |
| 26 | 16 | "Keyed Up and Locked Out" | June 5, 2023 | 0.17 |
| 27 | 17 | "When Kat's Away, the Kevin Will Play" | June 12, 2023 | 0.17 |
| 28 | 18 | "IAM Is an Enigma" | June 19, 2023 | 0.17 |
| 29 | 19 | "Here Comes Lava Girl" | June 26, 2023 | 0.13 |
| 30 | 20 | "Eyes on the Prize" | July 3, 2023 | N/A |
| 31 | 21 | "Nobody Puts Barbie In A Corner" | July 10, 2023 | 0.15 |
| 32 | 22 | "The Cost Of Having It All" | July 17, 2023 | 0.16 |

== See also ==
- List of tattoo TV shows
