= Amy Nicoletto =

American tattoo artist

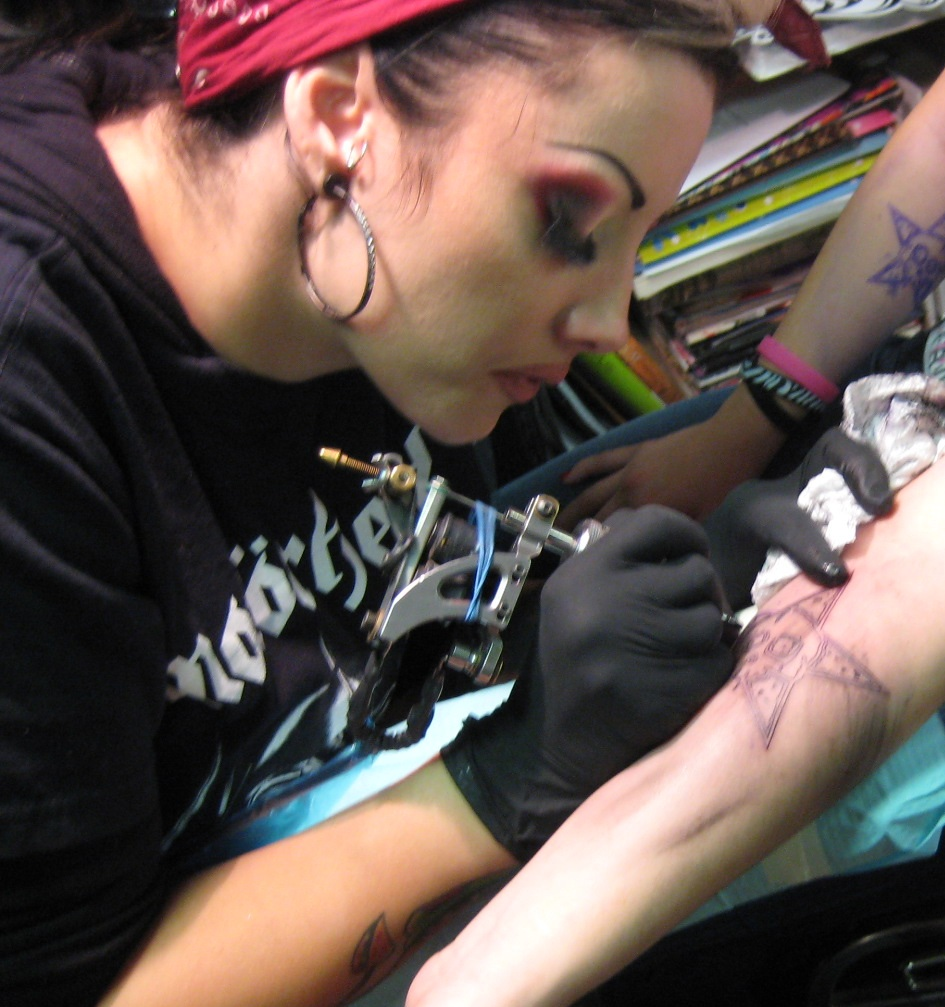
- Nicoletto working at American Electric Tattoo Company
- Born: New Jersey, U.S.
- Occupations: Tattoo artist; television personality
- Website: www.orderofthesacredcrowtattoo.com

Amy Nicoletto is an American tattoo artist and television personality. She is most known for her appearances on the TLC reality television show LA Ink. Her name is sometimes misspelled as Nicoletti or Nicoletta.

== Biography ==
Amy Nicoletto was born in southern New Jersey. She received her first tattoo at the age of 18 and has embraced the art of tattooing ever since. Her career has spanned many fields including specialist and management roles in hospitality, medical assisting and also as a makeup artist for a cosmetics chain. She completed a two-year apprenticeship and then began professionally tattooing in 2005 locally in New Jersey.

In 2008, she relocated to Los Angeles, California and landed a spot at Craig Jackman's American Electric Tattoo on Sunset Silver Lake, Los Angeles. A casting representative for TLC's LA Ink approached her at that shop and asked if she would like to try out for a new reality show. She was hired and appeared in many episodes during Seasons 3 and 4 playing the role of herself on LA Ink. On the show, she took up a short-lived position at High Voltage Tattoo, then moved back to American Electric Tattoo and continued on as an LA Ink show regular well into the end of the last season. On one episode, Nicoletto tattooed black-and-gray stitches around the neck of Dr. Chud from the rock band The Misfits.

After spending over a year attending several conventions, shows, & constantly on the road guest spotting in various locations around the USA. Nicoletto's favorite tattoo styles include black-and-gray portraits, Japanese-influenced tattoos and just about anything with color, as well as lettering. Nicoletto returned back home to South Jersey to open her own tattoo shop in 2017, Order of the Sacred Crow, where she also enjoys spending time with her French Bulldogs. She no longer attends tattoo conventions.
