= Epic Ink =

- Genre: Reality
- Created by: Chris 51; Matador Content
- Composers: Strike Audio; Extreme Music
- Country of origin: United States
- Original language: English
- No. of seasons: 1

Production
- Executive producers: Jay Peterson; Todd Lubin; Sara Quick; Jerry Carita
- Producer: Tessa Khalaieff
- Production location: Springfield, Oregon
- Cinematography: Patrick Cummings
- Editor: Brian D'Amico
- Camera setup: Multiple-camera setup
- Running time: 25 minutes
- Production companies: A&E Television Networks; Matador Content

Original release
- Network: A&E
- Release: August 20 – October 22, 2014

Epic Ink is an American reality television series that premiered on August 20, 2014 on A&E Network. The series features a group of talented tattoo artists and their love of tattooing pop culture at their Oregon-based shop Area 51 Tattoo.

== Premise ==
The series follows Area-51 Tattoo owner Chris 51 and his "out-of-this-world" team of tattoo artists as they bring pop-culture (movies, comics, cartoons, sci-fi and fantasy) to life as living body art in eye-popping ink. Their specialties are hyperrealistic tattoos that are what they like to call, "geek-chic".

Opening introduction by narrator:

Chris Jones: We like to help people bring out their inner nerd. Heather Maranda: Area-51 is the place if you want to come and get sweet-ass crazy images. Chris 51: We don't settle for easy two-dimensional tattoos. We push the boundaries. Jeff Wortham: We just make history every day. Chris 51: We want popping off the [beep] skin. We do the most technological, realistic, crazy, hyper tattoos you've ever seen.

== Tattoo artists ==
- Chris 51 - Shop owner, one of the most well-respected tattoo artists, specializing in pop culture and alien art tattoos. Chris imagined and co-created the show, casting all his friends for the roles.
- Heather Maranda - Self-taught tattoo artist, specializing in cartoony/bright-color hyper-realistic tattoos
- Jeff Wortham - Comic book art, sci-fi and cartoon tattoos, travels the globe to tattoo at sci-fi conventions
- Chris Jones - Hailing from Wales, nominated for three consecutive Tattoo Industry Awards for Best UK Male, specializes in hyper-realistic and portrait tattoos
- Josh Bodwell - A "walking encyclopedia" of sci-fi trivia, specializes in sci-fi/futuristic, realism and portraiture tattoos.
- Caroline Russell - Shop manager/receptionist, not a "geek" on pop culture like the others and serves as the "nerd translator" between the "geeks" and "normal" people

== Episodes ==
No.	Title	Original release date	U.S. viewers (thousands)
1	"Welcome to Area 51"	August 20, 2014	948,000
In the series premiere, we meet the unique tattoo artists at Area 51 Tattoo: Chris 51 tattoos a client with Raphael from the Teenage Mutant Ninja Turtles, Heather inks a realistic portrait of Sloth and Chunk from the 1985 adventure movie, The Goonies, and Chris Jones brands an Arnold Schwarzenegger fan with the ultimate Terminator homage. Also, shop manager Caroline takes the artists on a surprise trip to the Goonies house in Oregon where they must do the "truffle shuffle" in order to come onto the porch.
2	"Comedians, Zombies and Space Cats, Oh My!"	August 27, 2014	801,000
The Area 51 crew put their hyper-realistic tattoo skills to the test that include: a portrait of the late comedian Chris Farley performing a populare Saturday Night Live skit that Chris Jones inks, a pair of ram horn tattoos Heather inks that seem to be popping out of her male client's head, and an eye-popping zombie pinup girl, Also a client brings in his pet cat who Josh turns into a hyper-real image of a "space cat" onto his chest, while Caroline babysits his friendly feline on a leash outside the shop.
3	"The Duel and the Dark Knight"	September 3, 2014	803,000
In honor of Batman's 75th Anniversary, Chris Jones inks a huge fan with a hyper-realistic tribute to the Dark Knight. Chris 51 brings a Tyrannosaurus rex out of extinction for a Jurassic Park fan. Heather inks a female client's first tattoo of her favorite video game, Elder Scrolls landscape into a artfully designed half sleeve in only one day. Also, Josh and Chris Jones team up to take a famous historical duel between Aaron Burr and Alexander Hamilton from the past and into the future by turning their dueling pistols into laser guns.
4	"It's Chi-Town, Baby!"	September 10, 2014	750,000
The Area 51 crew travel to Chicago, Illinois to tattoo at C2E2, one of the largest pop culture conventions in the country. But before heading out, Chris 51 tattoos an octopus wrapped around his client's shoulders. Caroline must stay behind to watch the shop, while Heather works on a client who wants a "birthed" unicorn in his hairy armpit. Back in Chi-town, Josh tattoos a realistic Donatello from Teenage Mutant Ninja Turtles 1990 film and Jeff inks a heavy metal-inspired R-2D2/C-3PO tattoo, while Chris Jones creates a RoboCop portrait.
5	"Friday the Thirteenth"	September 17, 2014	600,000
It's Friday the 13th and Chris 51 celebrates with his crew by throwing the biggest party that Area 51's ever seen with a surprise celebrity guest who gets her first tattoo ever. The clients come in costume: three female friends who work at a horror magazine together get horror and sci-fi themed tattoos. Chris Jones tattoos a hyper-realistic zombie from a George A. Romero classic horror film, Jeff creates a life-sized realistic ray gun on a client's hip, and Josh gets the honor of tattooing a lifelike portrait of Elvira, Mistress of the Dark.
6	"The Girl With the Monster Tattoo"	September 24, 2014	N/A
More unusual and unique tattoo ideas come into the shop: Chris Jones tattoos a hyper-realistic bloody mouth on a friend, Heather mashes up My Little Pony with the Four Horsemen of the Apocalypse, and Chris 51 and Jeff team up to ink a double space battle between a monster and a robot on two sisters. Also, Jeff honors a fellow tattoo artist by turning his hand into a real-life machine/cyborg, while Josh creates a realistic image of one female client's favorite Grimm Fairy Tale, Sleeping Beauty.
7	"Got My Eye on You"	October 1, 2014	N/A
A lot of original tattoo ideas come into the shop: Heather tattoos a bloodshot eyeball on the back of her client's head. Jeff creates a "Royale with Cheese" tattoo inspired by Pulp Fiction for one of the first client's he's ever tattooed. Chris Jones is faced with a client's difficult friend who tries to talk him out of tattooing a JFK cyborg on his chest. Chris 51 designs a scene from The Mikado musical for his client who's dressed like a geisha girl, and gets dressed up like one.
8	"Blood, Guts and Donuts"	October 8, 2014	N/A
Clients, who all want sc-fi tattoos come into Area 51: A Star Trek fan with a phaser pistol joins in on a dart gun battle with the guys, and gets a tattoo of the Enterprise. Jeff creates a Mars Attacks alien tattoo, while Chris Jones designs a bloody red skull on a female horror fan. After eating at the local Voodoo Doughnut, Chris 51 commissions Heather to tattoo a donut around his belly button, and also holds a donut-eating contest–the winner gets to "set" or slap his new tattoo, causing him pain.
9	"Take Me Out to the Ballgame"	October 15, 2014	N/A
When a Gremlins fan walks into the shop, Heather designs a Gizmo tattoo with half a sneering green gremlin face. Josh gives a Game of Thrones fan a dire wolf and dragon tattoo. As a bonding moment, a mother and daughter get tattoos of time travel devices together. After a baseball fan gets a tattoo of his favorite team the Eugene Emeralds's mascot, "Sluggo", Chris 51 and his team take Welshman Chris Jones out to his very first baseball game.
10	"Welcome to the Tattoo Jungle"	October 22, 2014	N/A
Chris Jones tattoos a female client's spirit animal—a wolf changing into a werewolf woman. Josh creates an original spin on the Captain Hook's crocodile from the Peter Pan stories. Heather cover-ups one of the first tattoos she's ever done on her long-time friend and replaces it with a lioness and cub tattoo, representing motherhood. Also, Chris 51 tattoos a myrtle tree with a fairy hidden in its leaves, while Jeff designs a cubism/nebula tigress in space tattoo.

== See also ==
- List of tattoo TV shows
