= Black Ink Crew: Chicago season 5 =

Black Ink Crew: Chicago
- Season 5
- Cover used by the iTunes Store
- Starring: Ryan Henry; Charmaine Walker; Phor Brumfield; Don Brumfield; Van Johnson; Liliana Barrios
- No. of episodes: 20

Release
- Original network: VH1
- Original release: January 2 – August 6, 2019

Season chronology
- ← Previous; Season 4 Next → Season 6

The fifth season of the reality television series Black Ink Crew: Chicago aired on VH1 from January 2, 2019 until August 6, 2019. It chronicles the daily operations and staff drama at an African American owned and operated tattoo shop 9MAG located in Chicago, Illinois.

== Main cast ==
- Ryan Henry
- Charmaine Walker
- Phor Brumfield
- Don Brumfield
- Van Johnson
- Liliana Barrios

== Recurring cast ==
- Ashley P
- JR Diaz
- Jenn
- Bella
- Neekbey
- Brittney Slam
- Gina
- Shine
- Evenita
- Adriana
- Danielle Jamison
- Cobra Kat

== Episodes ==
No. overall	No. in season	Title	Original release date	US viewers (millions)
55	1	"9MAG is Forever"	January 2, 2019	1.07
Ryan returns to run the shop with a new team and a fresh vision. Don, Char and Van try to move on from the hurt Ryan caused them. Phor is caught in the middle of his feuding tattoo family. Tempers flare when Ryan hands out a long overdue apology.
56	2	"Give Me a Smoothie Gina"	January 9, 2019	0.96
Charmaine uses her newfound celebrity to protect Phor when he becomes a hot topic. Van finally receives the forgiveness he's been pushing for. Don seizes an opportunity to make more money for his family. Ryan lays down the law for his staff.
57	3	"Tattoo Shop of Horrors"	January 16, 2019	0.93
Don takes over as manager, leading to growing tensions between him and Brittany. Ryan brings in a new tattoo artist from California. Van hires an apprentice, which does not sit well with everyone.
58	4	"Michael Jackson is Alive!"	January 23, 2019	0.87
Charmaine takes the crew to Las Vegas for a tattoo convention in order to prove herself to Ryan. When Van's apprentice shows up, everyone speculates where she will sleep. Don focuses on his family back in Chicago.
59	5	"She's Here If You Evenita"	January 30, 2019	0.94
Junior arrives in Las Vegas to take the guys out for a spin on the Strip. Shine contemplates giving up his guest artist spot at 9MAG. Things get awkward for everyone when Van and Jenn decide to head to the altar.
60	6	"Phor"	February 6, 2019	0.89
After Jenn and Van's Vegas chapel disaster, Charmaine tries to get the trip back on track with one last Vegas 9MAG pool party. Jenn and Van hash it out and Lily finally confronts Junior and Adriana. Phor spirals into a dark place.
61	7	"Potato with a Scarf On"	February 13, 2019	0.86
Junior is officially back at 9MAG and Charmaine hooks Ryan up with a celebrity client, Erica Mena. Bella reconnects with an old flame, and the gang gets together for a 9MAG Friendsgiving.
62	8	"I Didn't Say I Hate Her (I Just Don't Like Her)"	February 20, 2019	0.92
All of 9MAG reacts to what happened on Friendsgiving. Junior gets in touch with himself and his past, Don expands his horizons and Charmaine outs Lily as a racist.
63	9	"I Hope You Make It to America"	February 27, 2019	0.76
Ryan gets an ominous call for a meeting from the building management to discuss the future of 9MAG. Lily uses her break from the shop to focus on her art. Charmaine decides to organize a protest. Van does whatever it takes to win Jenn back.
64	10	"Lacuna Matata"	March 6, 2019	0.83
Ryan toils in secrecy on a new mystery shop while Van scares some sense into his daughter's bae. Rising actor Don ponders a move to NYC. Phor shines in the studio while Charmaine wants answers about her future with 9MAG. Ryan debuts his dope new shop.
65	11	"Don't Come for Queen Latifah"	June 4, 2019	0.74
Ryan's all new 9Mag shop is open for business with a fresh talent line up. Van takes over the old shop by marking his territory with a new set of rules. Phor is back from hiatus and learns that not everyone has access to Ryan's new kingdom.
66	12	"Ryantology"	June 11, 2019	0.66
Van's leadership skills are put under the microscope, as the old shop continues to suffer. Meanwhile, Lily wonders if she still has a future at 9Mag. Charmaine's parents come to town and Phor receives a baller opportunity.
67	13	"Team Bonding!"	June 18, 2019	0.72
When Ryan decides to treat the new 9Mag and old 9Mag to a team building trip in Miami, Charmaine questions her future with 9Mag and an emotional Ryan releases some pent-up anger towards the OGs.
68	14	"From Chi-ami to Sky-ami"	June 25, 2019	0.78
Mandatory team bonding in Miami pays off as Charmaine and Lily put years of beef behind them. Phor makes his triumphant return to the stage. When Lily lashes out at Neek, Ryan's hard-won 9MAG peace goes left. Sky shows up to connect with the Chicago crew.
69	15	"The Cover Up is Worse Than the Crime"	July 2, 2019	0.77
Van defends himself and his artwork against a few unhappy clients causing legal trouble for Ryan. While Don and Ashley view houses at the top of their non-existent budget, a familiar face returns for a second chance at life.
70	16	"What Is This, A Reunion Show?"	July 9, 2019	0.73
The 9MAG crew--past and present--takes over the Chicago Tattoo Convention, digging up buried conspiracy theories and dragging old rivalries into the ground.
71	17	"The Steve Harvey Show"	July 16, 2019	0.71
After showing no remorse for tarnishing the 9MAG brand at the Chicago Tattoo Convention, Van fires Lily. Charmaine goes back on her word forcing Neek to give her an ultimatum. Ryan and Phor fly to LA for an appearance on the Steve Harvey show.
72	18	"Deja Vu"	July 23, 2019	0.79
Charmaine returns to 9MAG in hopes of getting her job back. Van takes his daughter on a college tour and Don asks Ashley for another chance at a perfect wedding. A rumor started by an unlikely source gains legs quickly.
73	19	"The Vianna and the Long Haitian"	July 30, 2019	0.88
Neek plans to surprise Charmaine in South Carolina with a marriage proposal and invites the crew along for the event. A few unexpected guests and a powerful history lesson force everyone to revisit the past and be grateful for the present.
74	20	"Period, End of Sentence"	August 6, 2019	0.82
The happiest day of Charmaine's life is overshadowed by a rumor that won't die. Ryan decides it's time for a change at 9MAG and Don is just the one to make it.
