= The Vermin =

American punk rock band

- Origin: Las Vegas, Nevada, United States
- Genres: Punk rock
- Years active: (1984 or 1986)–present
- Label: Wood Shampoo
- Members: Dirk Vermin; Rob Ruckus; Gerry "Turbo" Proctor
- Past members: Anthony Hudak; Dave Sorensen; Miles Francis; Paul Summers, Jr. Derek Weishaupt; Kelly Clark
- Website: www.verminvegas.com

The Vermin is a punk rock band from Las Vegas, Nevada. The band formed in 1984 (1986 in some sources) as Vermin From Venus by singer and guitarist Dirk Vermin, and was noted for releasing one of the first independent punk rock albums in Las Vegas, Sex on Planet X. In 1994, Vermin and bassist Rob Ruckus formed a punk cover band called Godboy, and in 1995 the bands merged, adopting the name The Vermin. The band recorded their first album under their new name, Hell or Las Vegas, in 1996 with drummer Anthony Hudak, but Hudak left the band soon after and was immediately replaced with current drummer Gerry "Turbo" Proctor. The band was featured in the low-budget horror film Trans-American Killer in 2005. Singer Dirk Vermin opened Pussykat Tattoo in 1999; the shop, Vermin, and bassist Ruckus are currently featured in the A&E program Bad Ink.

== Discography ==
=== Albums ===
- Sex on Planet X (1989) (as Vermin From Venus)
- Push and Shove (1994) (as Vermin From Venus)
- Hell or Las Vegas (1996)
- The Vermin Vs. You! (1998)
- Loose Women, Hard Livin' and the Devil (2000)
- Joe's Shanghai (2008)

=== Singles and EPs ===
- Attack of the Killer Virgin Prom Queen (1986) (as Vermin From Venus)
- Neat Damned Noise (1996)
- The Exciting Sounds of Al Martino (2009)

=== Compilations ===
- A Fist Full of Hell (2006)

== Band members ==
=== Current ===
- Dirk Vermin – lead vocals, guitar
- Rob Ruckus – bass, vocals
- Gerry "Turbo" Proctor – drums, vocals

=== Former ===
- Anthony Hudak – drums
- Dave Sorensen – bass
- Miles Francis – bass
- Paul Summers, Jr. – lead guitar
- Derek Weishaupt – drums
- Kelly Clark – lead guitar
