= Temple Riders =

Mormon motorcycle club

The Temple Riders is a Mormon motorcycle club founded in 1987.

There are over 750 members in chapters spread out to many states and few countries.

== See also ==
- Bikers for Christ
