= Kim Saigh =

American tattoo artist and television personality

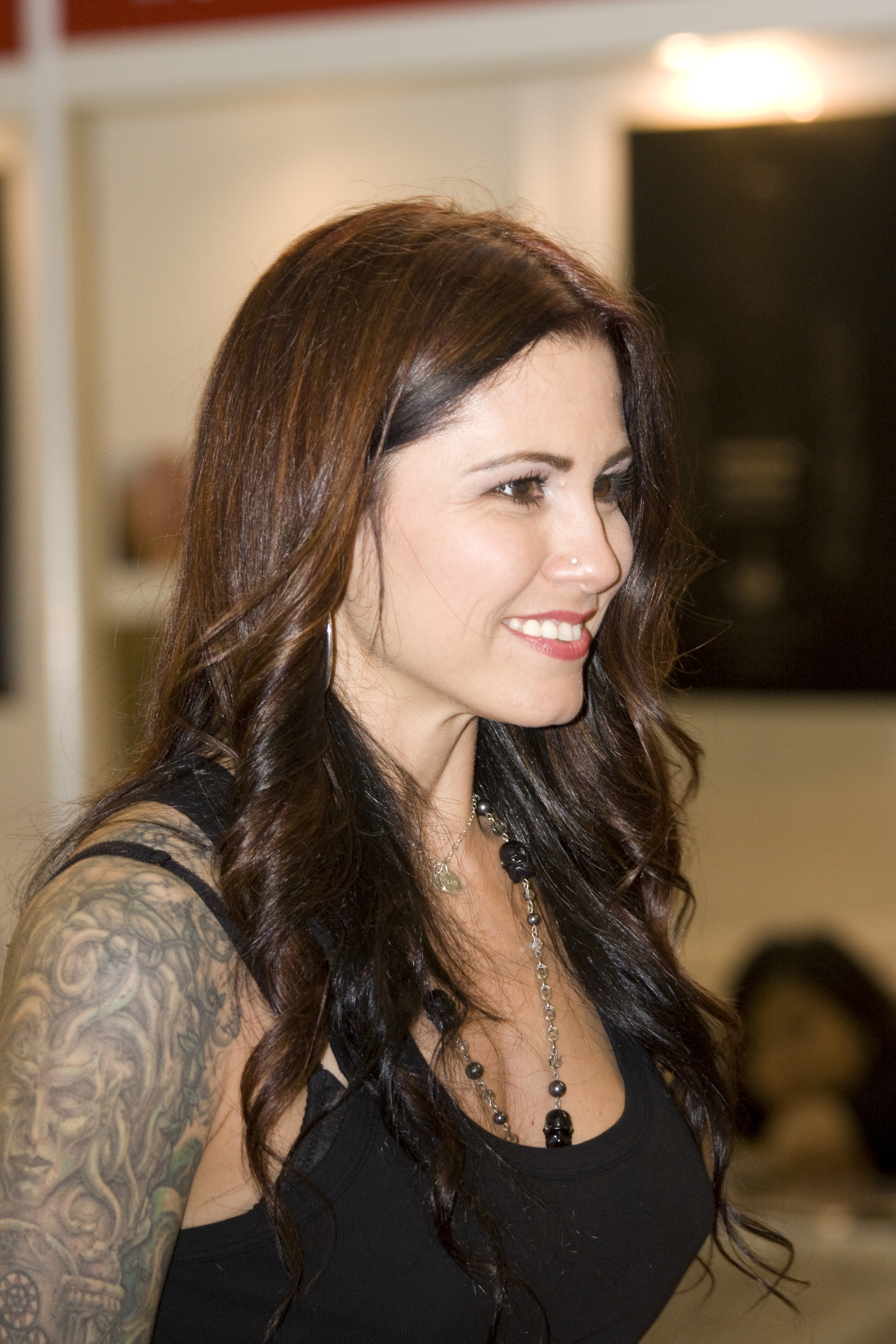
- Calgary Tattoo & Arts Festival, 2007
- Born: June 25, 1973 (age 53); Westlake, Ohio, U.S.
- Occupations: Tattoo artist; television personality
- Website: www.kimsaigh.com

Kim Saigh (born June 25, 1973) is an American tattoo artist and television personality. She is best known for her work as a contributing artist on the TLC reality television show LA Ink.

== Biography ==
Saigh was born in Westlake, Ohio on June 25, 1973. She got her first tattoo at the age of 16. At age 18, she became an apprentice at one of her friend's tattoo studios. At age 21, she moved to Chicago, Illinois upon the suggestion of tattoo artist Guy Aitchison. For 13 years, she tattooed clients in Chicago, where she opened Cherry Bomb Tattoo. Her reputation as "a great tattoo artist" led to her being cast on the TLC reality television show LA Ink. She then moved to Los Angeles, California to do the show.

In 2009, she opened Memoir Tattoo in Los Angeles with her partner, fellow artist Shawn Barber.

In 2017, Men's Health included her on its list of the "7 Tattoo Artists You Gotta Follow on Instagram This Week". In 2018, Los Angeles included her on its list of the "12 L.A.-Based Women Tattoo Artists You Need to Follow on Instagram".

Saigh stated that she draws inspiration for her tattoos from Art Nouveau, religious art, fairy tale art, and Eastern art, among others. She has also worked on ad campaigns and concert posters.

== Filmography ==
=== Television ===
| Year | Title | Notes |
|---|---|---|
| 2007–2009 | LA Ink | 18 episodes |
| 2009 | Osbournes Reloaded | 1 episode |
