= LA Ink =

American reality television show

- Genre: Reality television
- Starring: Kat Von D; Corey Miller; Hannah Aitchison; Kim Saigh; Pixie Acia
- Theme music composer: John Ernst (2010–11)
- Opening theme: "Dancing With Myself" by Nouvelle Vague (2007); "Yeah 2.0" by Aaron (AJ) Halpern, Scot "1T" Vanderpool, Deborah Bond, and Jenee Bevett (2008–10)
- Country of origin: United States
- Original language: English
- No. of seasons: 4
- No. of episodes: 84

Production
- Executive producer: Gil Lopez
- Running time: 42–43 minutes
- Production company: Original Media

Original release
- Network: TLC
- Release: August 7, 2007 – September 15, 2011

Related
- Miami Ink; London Ink; NY Ink

LA Ink is an American reality television show on TLC that follows the events of the High Voltage Tattoo (and, later in the series, American Electric) tattoo studios in Los Angeles, California. The spin-off of TLC's Miami Ink, premiered on August 7, 2007.

In August 2011, TLC announced the cancellation ahead of the mid-season four premiere. However, the show was picked back up by the network, and continued for 3 more seasons. All 4 seasons are available for streaming on Amazon Prime Video.

== Background ==
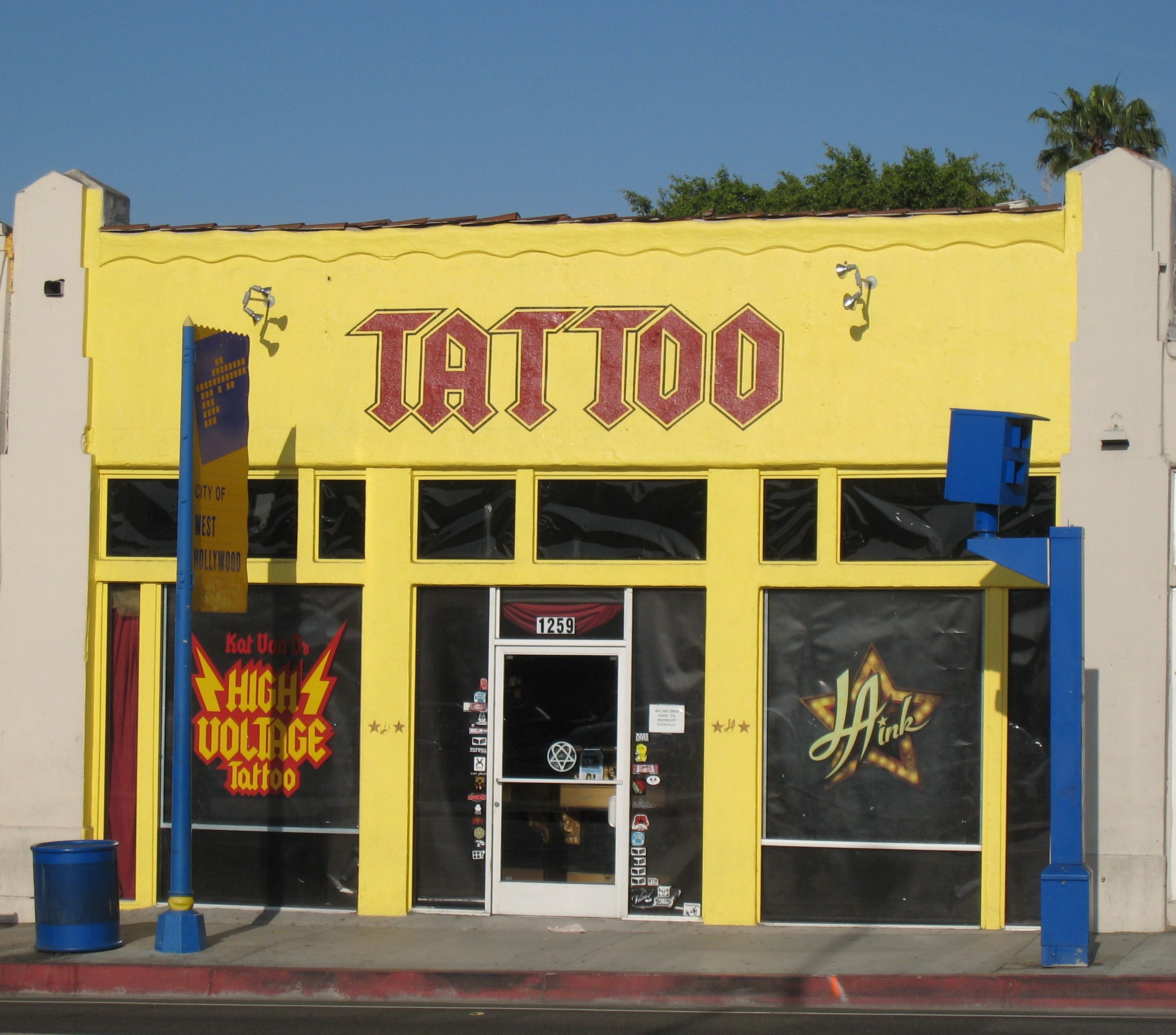
High Voltage Tattoo in West Hollywood, California

After leaving the hit program Miami Ink because of a dispute with her fellow cast members, Kat Von D moved back to Los Angeles to open her own tattoo shop and was offered a spin-off show. Initially, she hired her close friend Amber "Pixie" Acia to be the shop manager, and her good friend Corey Miller as a tattoo artist. After considering many more artists for the job, Von D hired Hannah Aitchison and Kim Saigh to work for her as well. The cameras follow her as she opens the shop, while capturing everything that unfolds in between.

Each customer coming into the shop usually has a story or reason behind their tattoo. On occasion, even known celebrities make an appearance to get tattooed by Kat or one of the other artists.

Inevitably, as the show progressed, changes occurred. Von D fired Acia during the second part of Season 1. Saigh and Aitchison left the show after the Season 2 finale. Season 3 premiered with a new shop manager, former Rock of Love competitor Aubry Fisher, but she was fired by Von D in the mid-season 3 premiere after getting into a lot of trouble with most of the people at the shop.

Tattoo artist Amy Nicoletto was hired on a trial basis, but left to work at American Electric, owned by Craig Jackman. Tattoo artist Paulie Tattoo was also hired and quit to go to American Electric, because of lack of work. Fisher soon joined them as a "shop helper" at American Electric after she got fired from High Voltage. Fisher left to pursue her dream of becoming a make-up artist without telling Craig and was later fired from American Electric, but does make an appearance for two episodes in the fourth season when she appeared at the shop's 11th Anniversary as a guest.

Von D broke a Guinness world record on the show, tattooing 400 people with the "LA" part of the LA Ink logo in 24 hours, giving the money raised to charity. The record was broken in June 2008 by Kat's ex-husband Oliver Peck who tattooed 415 tattoos of the number "13".

During Season 3, Nikko Hurtado appears as a guest artist on the show several times while Von D's sister Karoline and her brother Michael also make appearances on the show.

American Electric was the competitor tattoo shop to High Voltage during Season 3 and the first half of Season 4.

=== Ratings ===
LA Ink premiered on August 7, 2007, averaging 2.9 million total viewers at its time slot. According to The Hollywood Reporter, the number had made the show the most-watched series debut for the cable channel at the time since the premiere of the U.S. version of What Not to Wear in January 2003. This was also the highest-rated series premiere in the history of TLC among adults 18–34, with a rating of 2.6 and a viewer count of 1.5 million. The premiere was also the highest-rated basic cable prime-time program August 7 among several major adult demographics, including 18–34, 18–49 and 25–54.

== Cast ==
Shop owner

- Kat Von D (High Voltage Tattoo)
- Craig Jackman (American Electric) (seasons 3–4)

Shop managers

- Pixie Acia (season 1)
- Naheed Simjee (season 2)
- Aubry Fisher (season 3)
- Liz Friedman (season 3)
- Adrienne Ironside (seasons 3–4)

Merchandising

- Michael Drachenberg (seasons 3–4)

Kat's Personal Assistant

- Karoline Drachenberg

Tattoo artists

- Corey Miller
- Hannah Aitchison (seasons 1–2)
- Kim Saigh (seasons 1–2)
- Dan Smith (seasons 3–4)
- Nikko Hurtado (seasons 3–4)
- Amy Nicoletto (seasons 3–4)
- Paulie Tattoo (season 3)
- Ruth "Ruthless" Pineda (season 4)
- Jeff Ward (season 4)
- Khoi Nguyen (season 4)
- Adam Forman (season 4)

- Ahmad Harhash (season 4)

== Episodes ==
=== Series overview ===
Season	Episodes	Originally released	
Season	Episodes	First released	Last released
1	26	August 7, 2007	April 3, 2008
2	13	October 9, 2008	January 22, 2009
3	24	July 9, 2009	April 29, 2010
4	21	August 11, 2010	September 15, 2011

=== Season 1 (2007–08) ===
No. overall	No. in season	Title	Original release date
1	1	"Welcome Home Kat"	August 7, 2007
2	2	"Nowhere to Work"	August 14, 2007
3	3	"LA Ink Grand Opening"	August 21, 2007
4	4	"Boobs Rule"	August 28, 2007
5	5	"Master Cleanse"	September 4, 2007
6	6	"Corey's Vasectomy"	September 11, 2007
7	7	"Pixie's Surgery"	September 18, 2007
8	8	"Kat's Gnarly Day"	September 25, 2007
9	9	"Kim Looks For Love"	October 2, 2007
10	10	"Kat's in Love"	October 9, 2007
11	11	"Holly's Here"	October 16, 2007
12	12	"Pixie's Got the Blues"	October 23, 2007
13	13	"Big Decisions"	October 30, 2007
14	14	"Kat's Back but Where's Hannah"	January 8, 2008
15	15	"Pixie Moonlights"	January 15, 2008
16	16	"Kat Cleans Up"	January 22, 2008
17	17	"New Beginnings"	January 29, 2008
18	18	"Novelty Girls"	February 5, 2008
19	19	"Skate Ramp"	February 12, 2008
20	20	"Kat's World Record"	February 19, 2008
21	21	"Kat Gets a Scare"	February 28, 2008
22	22	"Corey's Dilema"	March 6, 2008
23	23	"The Worst Day Ever"	March 13, 2008
24	24	"Life After Pixie"	March 20, 2008
25	25	"Orbi's Secret"	March 27, 2008
26	26	"On the Rocks"	April 3, 2008

=== Season 2 (2008–09) ===
No. overall	No. in season	Title	Original release date
27	1	"Help Wanted"	October 9, 2008
28	2	"Comic Relief"	October 16, 2008
29	3	"Crüe Fest"	October 23, 2008
30	4	"Cover Girl"	October 30, 2008
31	5	"Corey's Fort"	November 6, 2008
32	6	"Kat Gets Hypnotized"	November 13, 2008
33	7	"Kim's Big Deal"	November 20, 2008
34	8	"Kat Tales"	December 4, 2008
35	9	"Hannah and Corey Jam Session"	December 11, 2008
36	10	"Funny Farm"	December 18, 2008
37	11	"It's All About Family"	January 8, 2009
38	12	"66 Nikkis"	January 15, 2009
39	13	"First Anniversary"	January 22, 2009

=== Season 3 (2009–10) ===
No. overall	No. in season	Title	Original release date
40	1	"Kat's Back"	July 9, 2009
41	2	"Stranger in my Shop"	July 16, 2009
42	3	"Kat Bares It All"	July 23, 2009
43	4	"Aubry Tries to Help"	July 30, 2009
44	5	"Tick, Tock, Biological Clock"	August 6, 2009
45	6	"While Kat's Away, Aubry Will Play"	August 13, 2009
46	7	"Feelings Rule"	August 20, 2009
47	8	"Tramp Stamp of Approval"	August 27, 2009
48	9	"Sobriety & Sisterhood"	September 3, 2009
49	10	"Outside Interests"	September 10, 2009
50	11	"Blonde Ambition"	September 17, 2009
51	12	"LA Pink"	September 24, 2009
52	13	"The Final Showdown"	October 1, 2009
53	14	"Showdown at the Shop"	February 18, 2010
54	15	"Training Day"	February 24, 2010
55	16	"What's Wrong Kat"	March 4, 2010
56	17	"Whose Party Is It?"	March 11, 2010
57	18	"Gone Too Far"	March 18, 2010
58	19	"Enough is Enough"	March 25, 2010
59	20	"Challenge for Kat"	April 1, 2010
60	21	"Feeling the Heat"	April 8, 2010
61	22	"Tension Between Friends"	April 15, 2010
62	23	"Caught in a Lie"	April 22, 2010
63	24	"Time is Up"	April 29, 2010

=== Season 4 (2010–11) ===
No. overall	No. in season	Title	Original release date
64	1	"Kat Loses Her Rock"	August 11, 2010
65	2	"Kat's New Journey"	August 18, 2010
66	3	"The Return of the Rock?"	August 25, 2010
67	4	"The Rock Rolls"	September 1, 2010
68	5	"The Truce"	September 8, 2010
69	6	"Strictly Business"	September 15, 2010
70	7	"The Black Widow"	September 22, 2010
71	8	"Oh Brother"	September 29, 2010
72	9	"Rock and Ink"	October 6, 2010
73	10	"The Missing Piece"	October 13, 2010
74	11	"Wet Paint"	October 20, 2010
75	12	"Kat Minus Sixx"	October 27, 2010
76	13	"Kat in Wonderland"	November 3, 2010
77	14	"New Beginnings"	July 28, 2011
78	15	"Kat's New Roommate"	August 4, 2011
79	16	"Tats for Japan"	August 11, 2011
80	17	"Addicted"	August 18, 2011
81	18	"Photo Finish"	August 25, 2011
82	19	"Kat & Jesse in Baja"	September 1, 2011
83	20	"While Kat's Away"	September 8, 2011
84	21	"Nothing Is Forever, Not Even Tattoos"	September 15, 2011

== See also ==
- List of tattoo TV shows
