= Kat Tat =

American tattoo artist

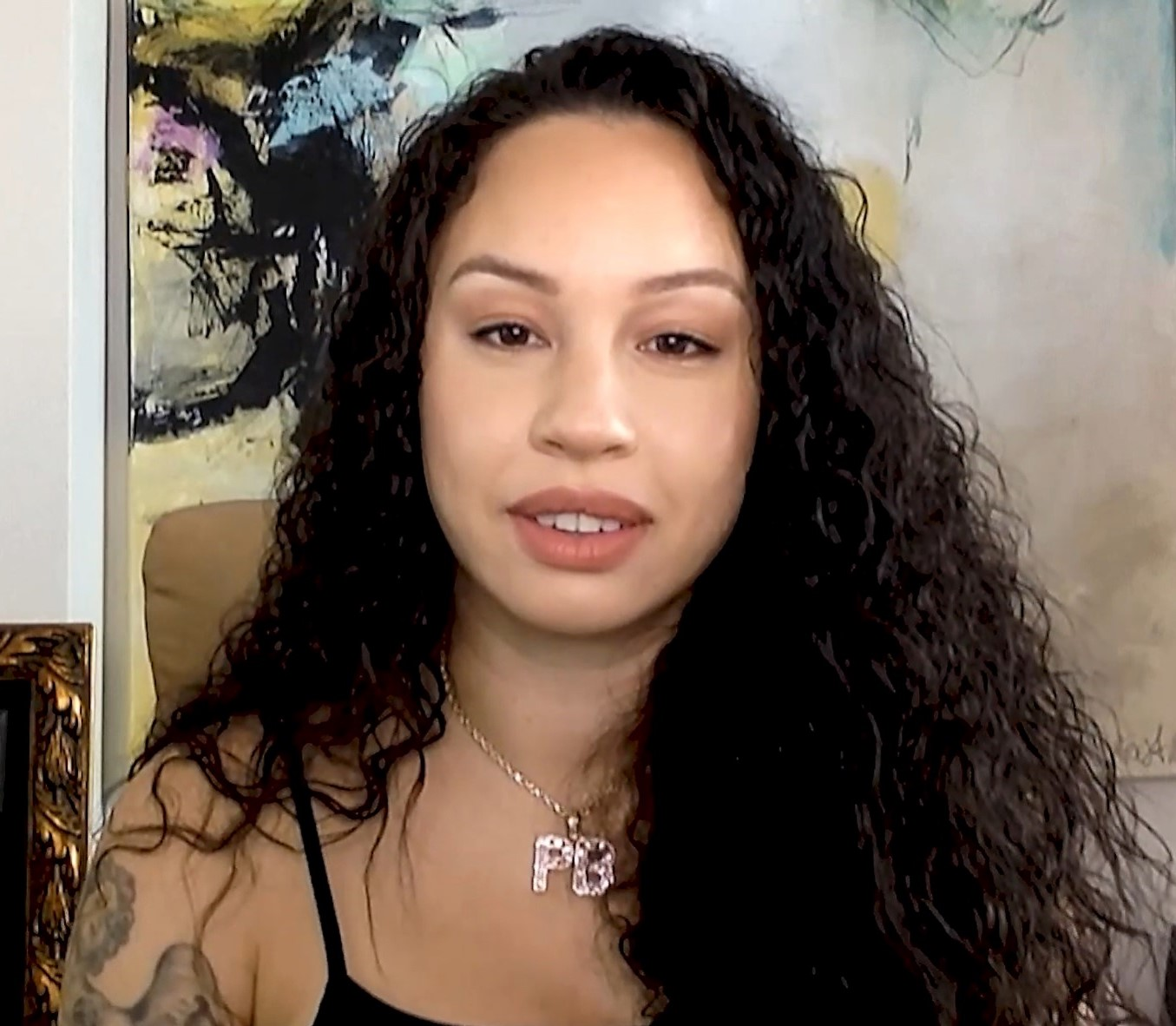
- Kat Tat in 2022
- Born: Katrina Jackson; 1991 (age 33–34); Chicago, Illinois, U.S.
- Occupations: Tattoo artist; television personality; entrepreneur

Katrina Jackson (born 1991), known professionally as Kat Tat, is an American tattoo artist, television personality, and businesswoman. She is best known for starring in the VH1 television series Black Ink Crew: Chicago.

== Biography ==
Kat Tat was born Katrina Jackson in 1991. She grew up in Chicago, Illinois. She studied mathematics at the University of Missouri. She left school to make tattooing her full-time job.

She starred in the VH1 television series Black Ink Crew: Chicago for the first three seasons, and formerly starred on Black Ink Crew: Los Angeles for its second season. In 2018, she opened Enigma Tattoo, a tattoo shop in Beverly Hills, California. She has tattooed Idris Elba, Trey Songz, Faith Evans, and Von Miller.

She is married to American football player Jamie Collins. They have four children.

== Filmography ==
=== Television ===
| Year | Title | Notes |
|---|---|---|
| 2015–2017, 2020 | Black Ink Crew: Chicago | Main cast (seasons 1–3); Guest (season 6) |
| 2019 | Love & Listings | 4 episodes |
| 2022–23 | Black Ink Crew: Los Angeles | Recurring cast (season 2A); Main cast (season 2B) |
