= Daymond John =

American businessman (born 1969)

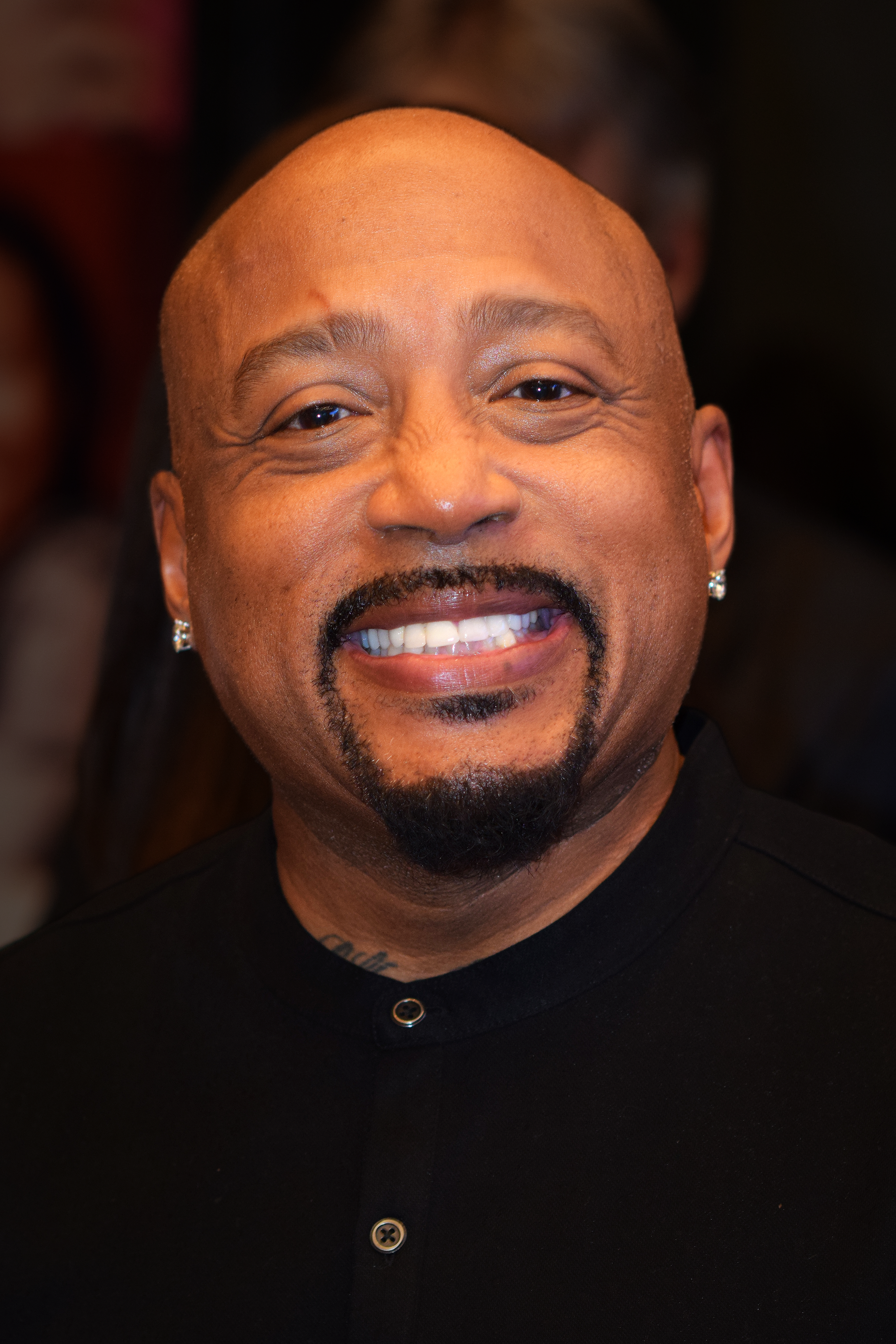
- John in 2023
- Born: Daymond Garfield John; February 23, 1969 (age 57); New York City, U.S.
- Occupations: Businessman; investor; television personality; author; public speaker
- Known for: founder and CEO of FUBU
- Spouse: Heather Taras (m. 2018)
- Children: 3
- Website: daymondjohn.com

Daymond Garfield John (born February 23, 1969) is an American businessman, investor, author and television personality. He is a Shark on the ABC reality television series Shark Tank. He is the founder and chief executive officer of FUBU.

== Early life ==
John was born on February 23, 1969, in Brooklyn, New York City, and was raised in Hollis, Queens. He attended Catholic school for seven years. He began working at the age of 10, when his parents divorced; one early job entailed handing out flyers for $2 ($8.38 in 2023) an hour. In high school, he participated in a program that allowed him to work a full-time job and attend school on an alternating weekly basis, which he credits with instilling an entrepreneurial spirit. After graduating from high school, he started a commuter van service and waited tables at Red Lobster. When John was 16, his mother had a boyfriend, an attorney, whom he considered a stepfather and mentor.

== Career ==
=== FUBU ===
John started FUBU in his mother's house in Hollis, Queens. When John first had the idea for a clothing company for young men, his mother taught him how to sew and supported him by allowing her house to be taken over to grow the business.

Wool ski hats with their tops tied off with fishing line were popular at the time, and John noticed them being sold for $20, which he considered overpriced. He went home and sewed about 90 hats with his next-door neighbor. They sold their homemade hats for $10 each on the corner of Jamaica Avenue and made $800 in a single day in 1992. After the hats, they began selling screen-printed T-shirts. To break into the market, they sold on consignment and at large events around the Northeast. To make ends meet, John held a full-time job at Red Lobster, working on the FUBU business in between shifts.

In addition to Brown, he recruited longtime friends J. Alexander Martin and Keith Perrin into the business, and began sewing the FUBU logo onto hockey jerseys, sweatshirts, and T-shirts. They loaned about 10 of the hockey jerseys out to rappers for their music videos for two years and got product placements in about 30 videos. Due to these placements, FUBU was perceived as a large and visible clothing brand, and stores started requesting their products. In 1993, he convinced LL Cool J, an old neighborhood friend, to wear a FUBU T-shirt for a promotional campaign. Later, while filming a 30-second advertising spot for The Gap, LL Cool J wore a FUBU hat in the commercial and incorporated the line "for us, by us" in his rapping.

In 1994, John and his business partners received $300,000 in retailers' orders at the Las Vegas fashion trade show Magic. Needing capital to make the products, John and his mother obtained a second mortgage on their house—a strategy John would later decline to recommend, as he had risked losing ownership of the house. After being turned down by 26 or 27 banks for a loan, his mother used the last of their money to take out an advertisement in The New York Times. As a result of the ad, FUBU made a deal with Samsung Textiles, allowing them to complete their orders.

FUBU has earned over $6 billion in global sales.

FUBU is featured at the Smithsonian's National Museum of African-American History and Culture.

=== Shark Tank ===
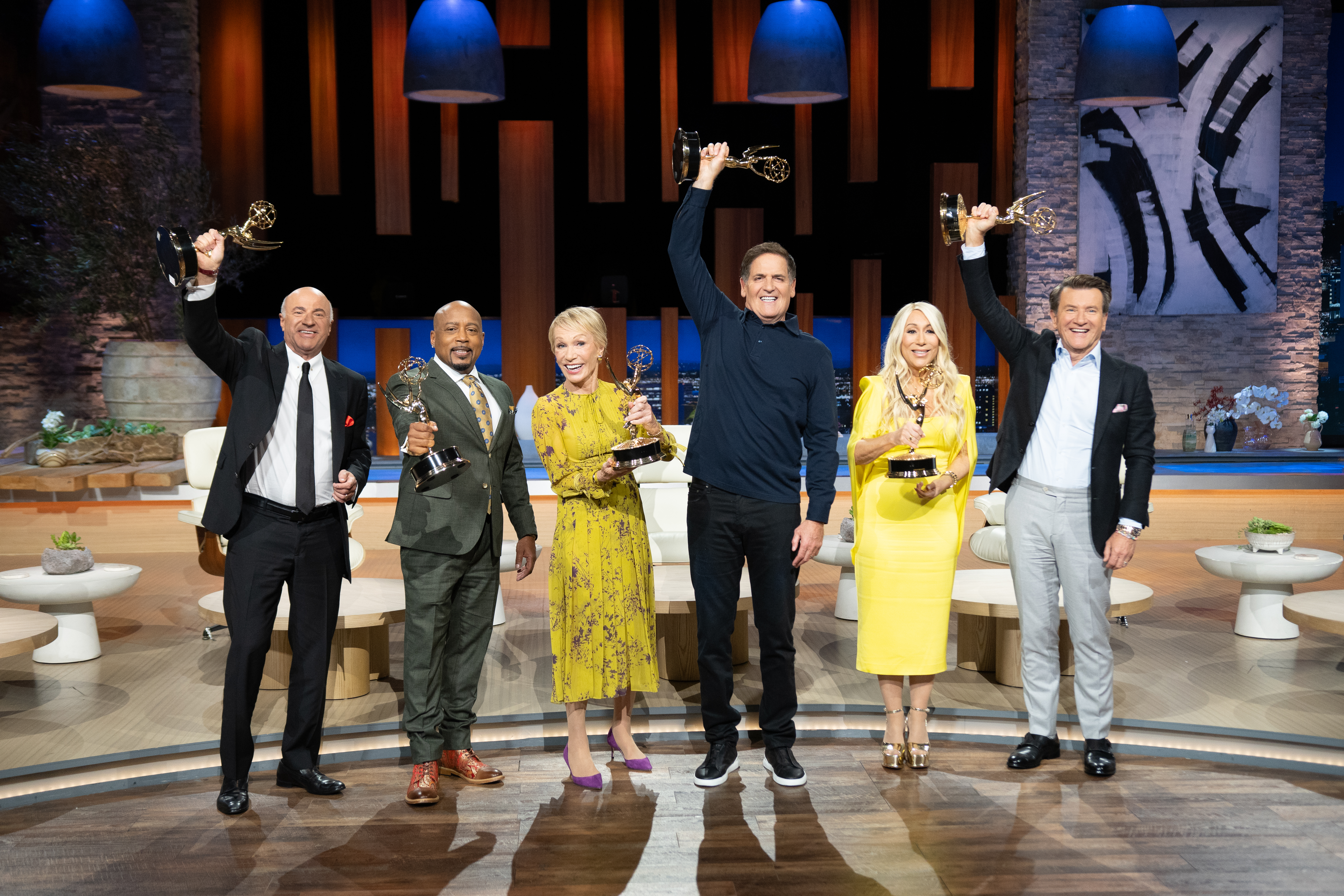
John and the sharks of Shark Tank in 2024.

In 2009, John received a call from Mark Burnett asking him to join the cast of ABC's new reality business show Shark Tank, which gives entrepreneurs the opportunity to pitch their businesses to investors, or "Sharks" in the hopes of receiving an investment. As of 2026, Shark Tank has run for 17 seasons. John has invested $8,567,000 of his own money in Shark Tank companies as of May 12, 2017. One of his favorite investments to date is Bombas socks. According to Forbes, Bombas has eclipsed $1 billion in lifetime sales. Shark Tank has won 5 Emmy Awards and has been nominated 27 times. The show won Outstanding Reality Program from 2012 to 2014.

On Season 5 of Shark Tank, John invested in Bubba's-Q Boneless Ribs on and helped grow the company from $154,000 in sales to $16 million in 3 years. In 2017, Bubba's-Q Boneless Ribs partnered up with Carl's Jr. to create the limited-edition Baby Back Rib Burger. In 2023, the LA Times published an article based on interviews with the Baker family, the owners of Bubba-Q's, where they expressed great dissatisfaction in dealing with John and his investment company. A permanent restraining order was later issued against the Bakers by federal judge Robert B. Kugler, who found that they had violated a 2019 settlement agreement requiring all parties to work together and not air their disagreements publicly.

John also made a unique deal with 15-year-old Moziah "Mo" Bridges, owner of Mo's Bows. John decided not to invest in Mo's Bows but instead to mentor the young entrepreneur. The company would eventually take on a seven-figure licensing partnership with the NBA to create bow ties that use the teams' logos.

On Season 6 of the show, John invested in Bombas socks. For every pair of socks sold, the company donates a pair to someone in need. Following his investment, total sales for the company increased from $450,000 in the first nine months to $12 million. As of May 2023, it is the best-selling Shark Tank product of all time, with $1.3 billion in cumulative sales according to Sony Pictures Television. He also invested in Sun-Staches, which would subsequently make $4.2 million in sales.

=== The Shark Group ===
John is the CEO and founder of The Shark Group, a brand management and consulting firm with headquarters in South Beach, Miami. The firm manages celebrity brands, Shark Tank investments, and John's public speaking business. The Shark Group has received four Webby Awards and a nomination for their work on Black Entrepreneurs Day.

=== Public speaking ===
In addition to his business and television career, Daymond John is an international public speaker who delivers keynote presentations at conferences, corporate events, universities and business forums worldwide. His speaking topics include entrepreneurship, business strategy, branding, leadership, motivation, resilience, health, and personal development, drawing on his experiences as an entrepreneur, investor, author and television personality.

=== Next Level Success ===
In 2015, John co-founded Daymond John's Success Formula, a program designed to teach business owners and entrepreneurs how to start and grow their business.

In September 2019, Daymond John's Success Formula rebranded to Next Level Success.

One of the organizations the program works with is the Network for Teaching Entrepreneurship. The program offers a $1,500 scholarship to two students a year.

=== Black Entrepreneurs Day ===
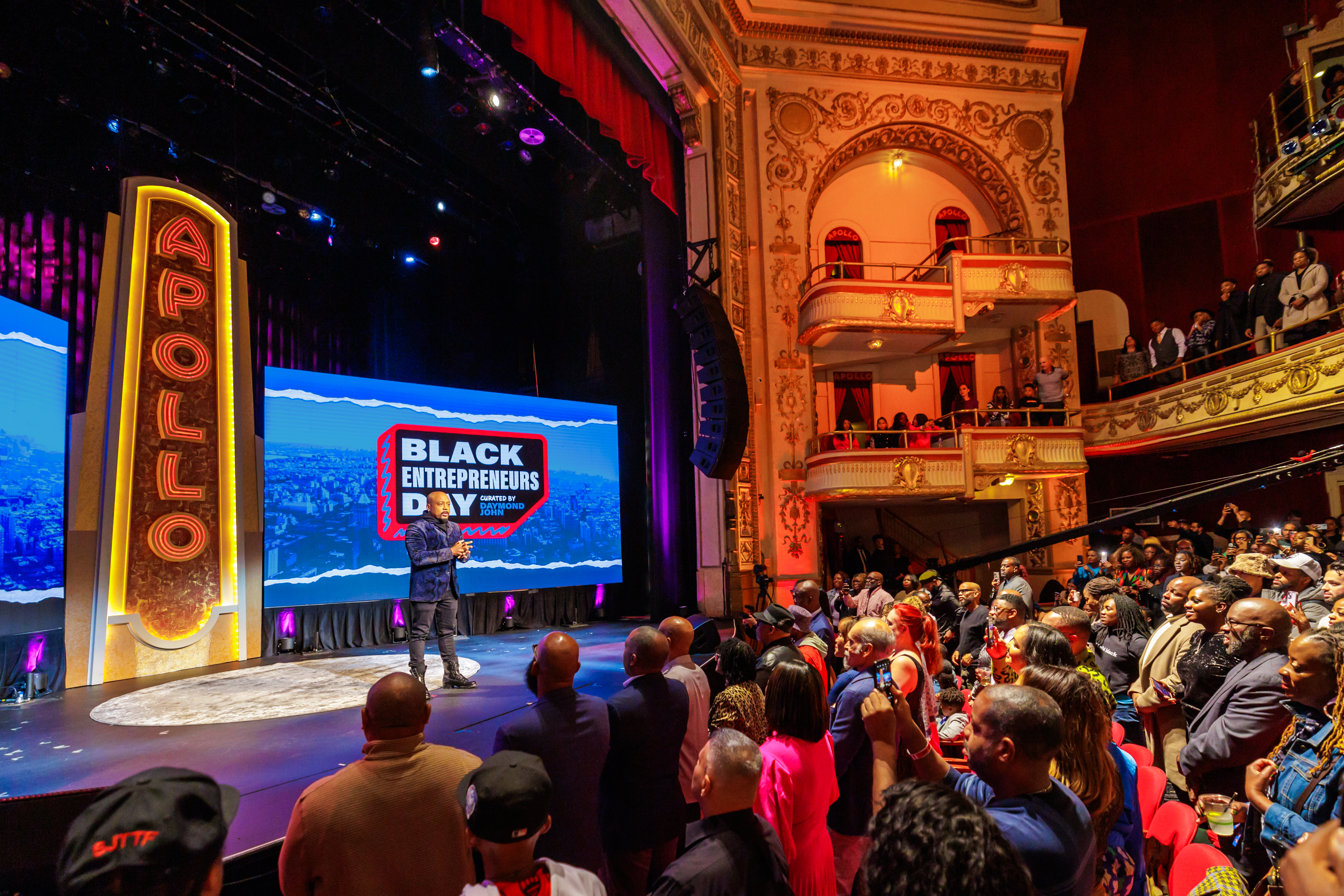
John at Black Entrepreneurs Day in 2023.

In 2020, Daymond John created and launched Black Entrepreneurs Day, an event aimed at promoting and encouraging entrepreneurship and black-owned business. According to People, John got the idea for Black Entrepreneurs Day after considering how he could make change in the wake of the George Floyd protests, and to channel frustration over inequities into positive change, as well as to "celebrate" black business owners. The event is held at the Apollo Theater in Harlem. It is held in partnership with the NAACP and corporate sponsors and features black business owners and celebrities.

=== Other appearances ===
In 2018 John appeared on Joey's World Tour, a YouTube channel devoted to fast food reviews.

In 2022, John competed in season eight of The Masked Singer as "Fortune Teller" who rode in a fortune teller machine-type vehicle. He was eliminated on "TV Theme Night" alongside Christopher Knight, Mike Lookinland, and Barry Williams as "Mummies".

John was a guest narrator at Disney's Candlelight Processional from December 7–9, 2022.

== Publications ==
John has released five books:

- Display of Power is written by Daymond John with New York Times best-selling collaborator, Daniel Paisner. Display of Power tells how four ordinary guys from Queens, New York, rose from street corners to corner offices and became the greatest trendsetters of their generation.
- The Brand Within: The Power of Branding from Birth to the Boardroom (2010), examines the loyalty relationships companies and celebrities seek to establish with their customers and fans, along with the identifying marks consumers carry when they buy into a brand or lifestyle.
- The Power of Broke: How Empty Pockets, a Tight Budget, and a Hunger for Success Can Become Your Greatest Competitive Advantage was written by John in 2016. John features various success stories from entrepreneurs such as Kevin Plank, Steve Aoki, Gigi Butler and Mo Bridges. The Power of Broke appeared on the Wall Street Journal and New York Times bestseller lists, and received an NAACP Image Award for Outstanding Instructional Literary Work.
- Rise and Grind: Outperform, Outwork, and Outhustle Your Way to a More Successful and Rewarding Life was released in January 2018. Rise and Grind became a New York Times and Wall Street Journal best-seller.
- Little Daymond Learns to Earn was released in March 2023. Little Daymond became a New York Times best-seller.

== Awards and recognition ==
John is a New York Times and Wall Street Journal best-selling author.

John has received numerous awards, including Brandweek Marketer of the Year, the NAACP Entrepreneurs of the Year Award (which he won twice), the Advertising Age Marketing 1000 Award for Outstanding Ad Campaign, the Essence Award, Crain's New York Business Forty Under Forty Award, Ernst & Young's New York Entrepreneur of the Year Award, the Brandeis University International Business School's Asper Award for Excellence in Global Entrepreneurship, Details 50 Most Influential Men, and the Congressional Achievement Award for Entrepreneurship (which he won twice).

In 2015, President Obama appointed John to the Presidential Ambassadors for Global Entrepreneurship initiative to promote underserved entrepreneurs.

== Bibliography ==
- Display of Power: How Fubu Changed a World of Fashion, Branding and Lifestyle (Naked Ink, 2007) ISBN 978-1595558534
- The Brand Within: The Power of Branding from Birth to the Boardroom (Display of Power Publishing, 2010) ISBN 978-0982596210
- The Power of Broke: How Empty Pockets, a Tight Budget, and a Hunger for Success Can Become Your Greatest Competitive Advantage, with Daniel Paisne (Crown Business, 2016) ISBN 978-1101903599
- Rise and Grind: Outperform, Outwork, and Outhustle Your Way to a More Successful and Rewarding Life, with Daniel Paisne (Currency, 2018) ISBN 978-0804189958

== Personal life ==
John admitted that he wasn't as available to his daughters during his first marriage as he wanted, telling a CNBC reporter that his wife "literally saw me on TV more than she saw me in person". He attributed his absence from his wife and children to a combination of work and socializing. In 2018, John married Heather Taras, his second wife, with whom he has a daughter, born in 2016. He has two daughters from his first marriage.

John is dyslexic and openly discusses the subject in hopes of inspiring others.

In April 2017, John was diagnosed with stage II thyroid cancer. John successfully underwent surgery to remove the cancerous nodule.

John is Catholic.

=== Philanthropy ===
John is on the Board of Overseers and volunteer as a host or judge at NFTE events. NFTE is a global organization with chapters in 12 countries that teaches the value of entrepreneurship and core competencies to students in low income areas.

John has supported other efforts to encourage black entrepreneurship, including Barack Obama's My Brother's Keeper Challenge, and he was involved in Michelle Obama's college initiative on National Signing Day, celebrating high school students pursuing higher education, held at Temple University.

=== Louis Farrakhan comments ===
On April 22, 2021, after attending the funeral for DMX, John posted a message to Twitter praising Louis Farrakhan, stating that the minister's speech was "powerful" and that his "deep understanding of the Bible and respect for other people's religions was truly inspiring."

John garnered instant backlash as people brought up Farrakhan's history of anti-Semitism and John immediately apologized and tweeted:

"In regards to my tweet regarding DMXs funeral, my comments on Minister Farrakhan were only related to what I just witnessed tonight, unbeknownst to his prior stances...As someone who was fortunate enough to have a step dad of the Jewish faith, I do not condone and never would condone any anti Semitic, prejudice or any remarks of hatred. The prior tweet will be removed to avoid further pain and confusion to anyone who has felt hurt in the past by any negative comments of his."

He deleted his previous tweet.

=== Filmography ===
Film and television appearances and roles
Year	Title	Role	Notes
2005	The Crow: Wicked Prayer	Proud Foot Joe	
2009–present	Shark Tank	Himself	Shark
2014	What Would You Do?	Himself	Season 9, episode 1
2014	Sharknado 2: The Second One	Wall Street Man	
2016	To Tell the Truth	Himself	Season 1, episode 6
2016	The $100,000 Pyramid	Himself	Season 1, episode 6
2016	Dr. Ken	Himself	Season 2, episode 7
2018	All About the Washingtons	Himself	Season 1, episode 1
2020	Billions	Himself	Season 5, episode 4
2020	Ridiculousness	Himself	Season 16, episode 31
2021	Wahl Street	Himself	5 episodes
2022	Celebrity Family Feud	Himself	Season 9, episode 9
2022	The Masked Singer	Fortune Teller	Eliminated in Season 8, episode 3
2023	Black Ink Crew	Himself	Season 10, episode 14
2023	The Eric Andre Show	Himself	Season 6, Episode 10
2023	Wild 'n Out	Himself	Season 19, episode 17
2024	Ridiculousness	Himself	Season 39, episode 5-6
