= The Masked Singer (American TV series) season 8 =

The Masked Singer
- Season 8
- Promotional poster for season eight, featuring "Bride"
- Starring: Robin Thicke; Jenny McCarthy Wahlberg; Ken Jeong; Nicole Scherzinger
- Hosted by: Nick Cannon
- No. of contestants: 22
- Winner: Amber Riley as "Harp"
- Runner-up: Wilson Phillips as "Lambs"
- No. of episodes: 13

Release
- Original network: Fox
- Original release: September 21 – November 30, 2022

Season chronology
- ← Previous; Season 7 Next → Season 9

The eighth season of the American television series The Masked Singer premiered on Fox on September 21, 2022, and concluded on November 30, 2022. The season was won by actor/singer Amber Riley as "Harp", with vocal group Wilson Phillips finishing second as "Lambs". The season was followed by a Christmas special, which aired on December 7, 2022.

== Panelists and host ==
Season 8 panelists and host

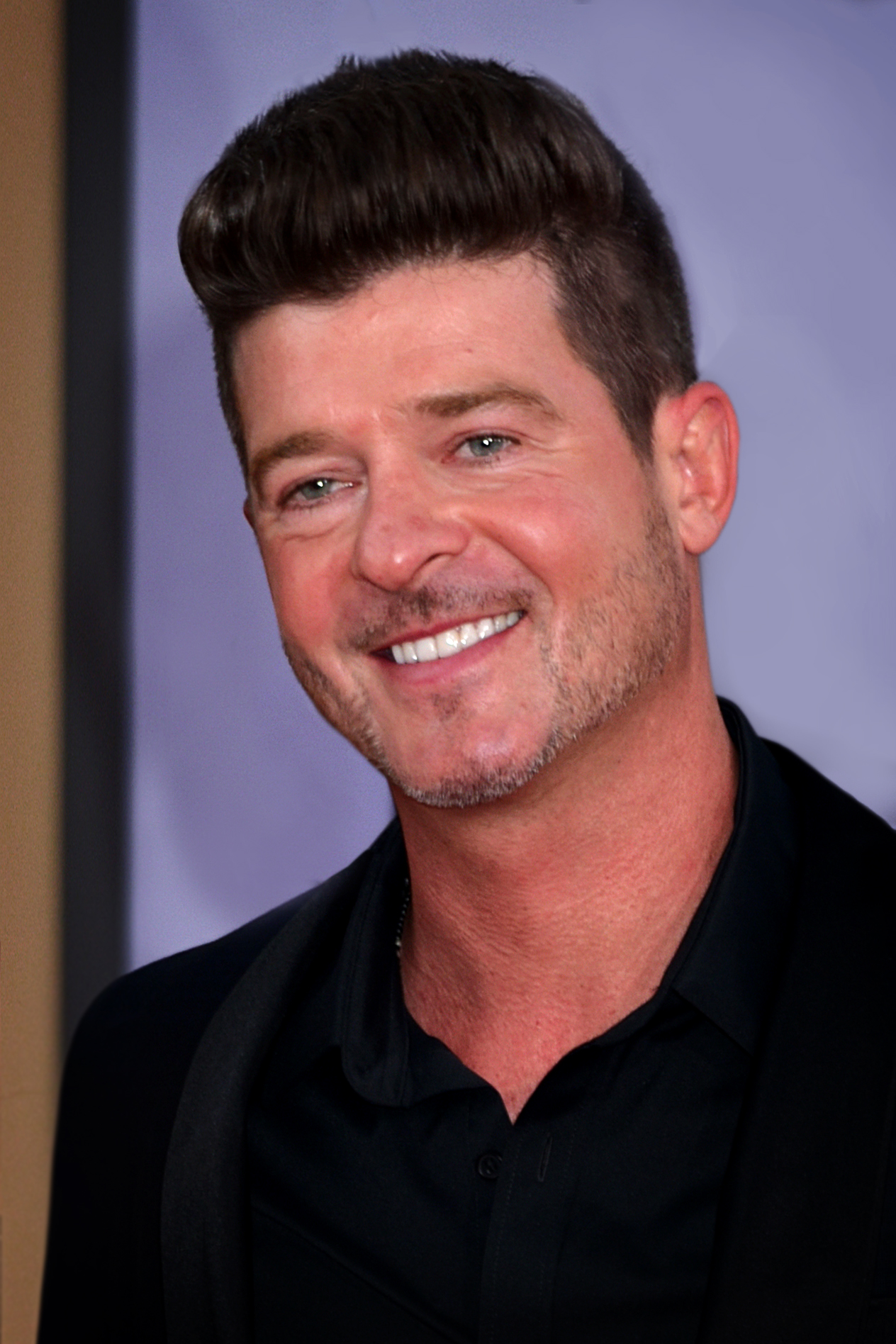
Robin Thicke

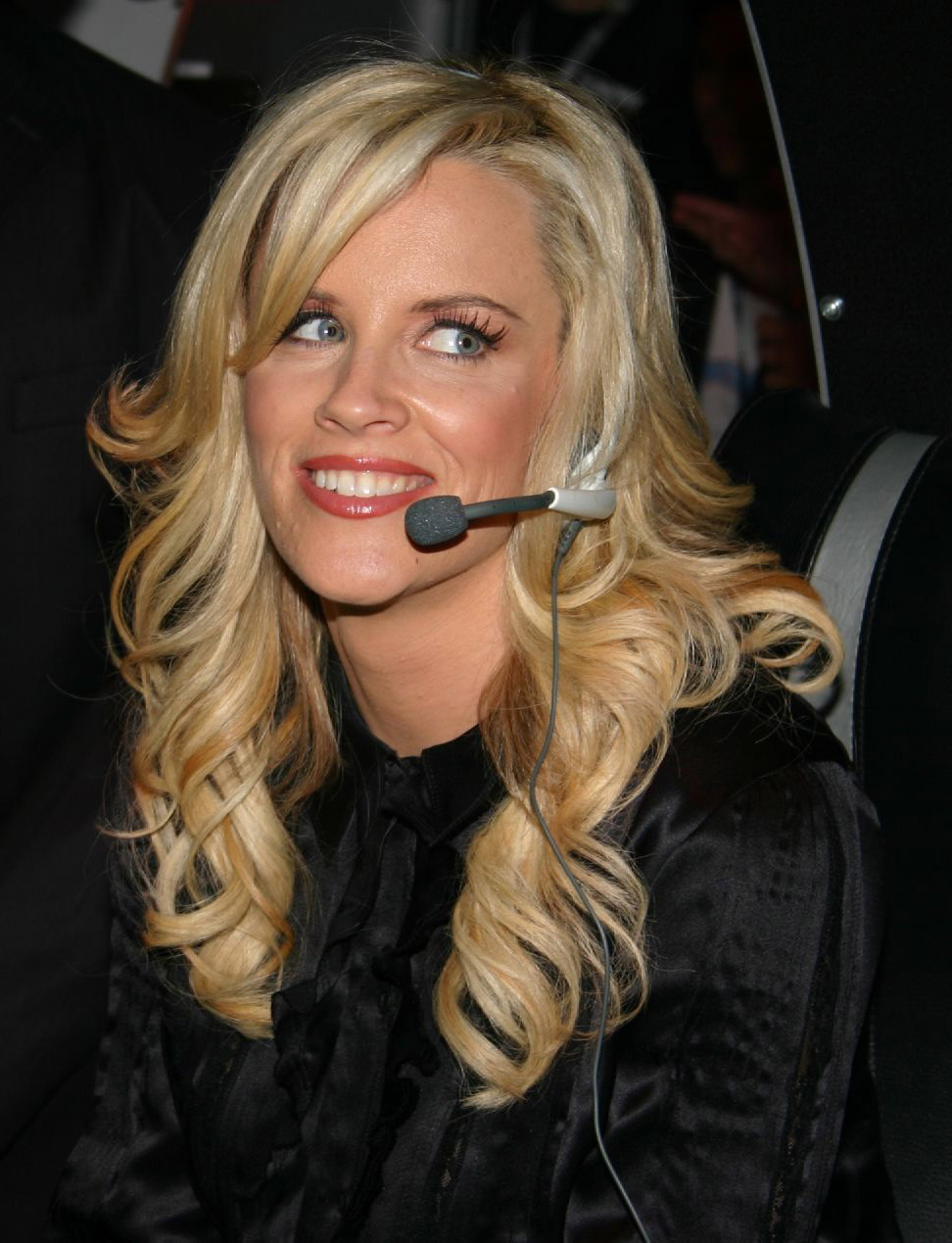
Jenny McCarthy Wahlberg

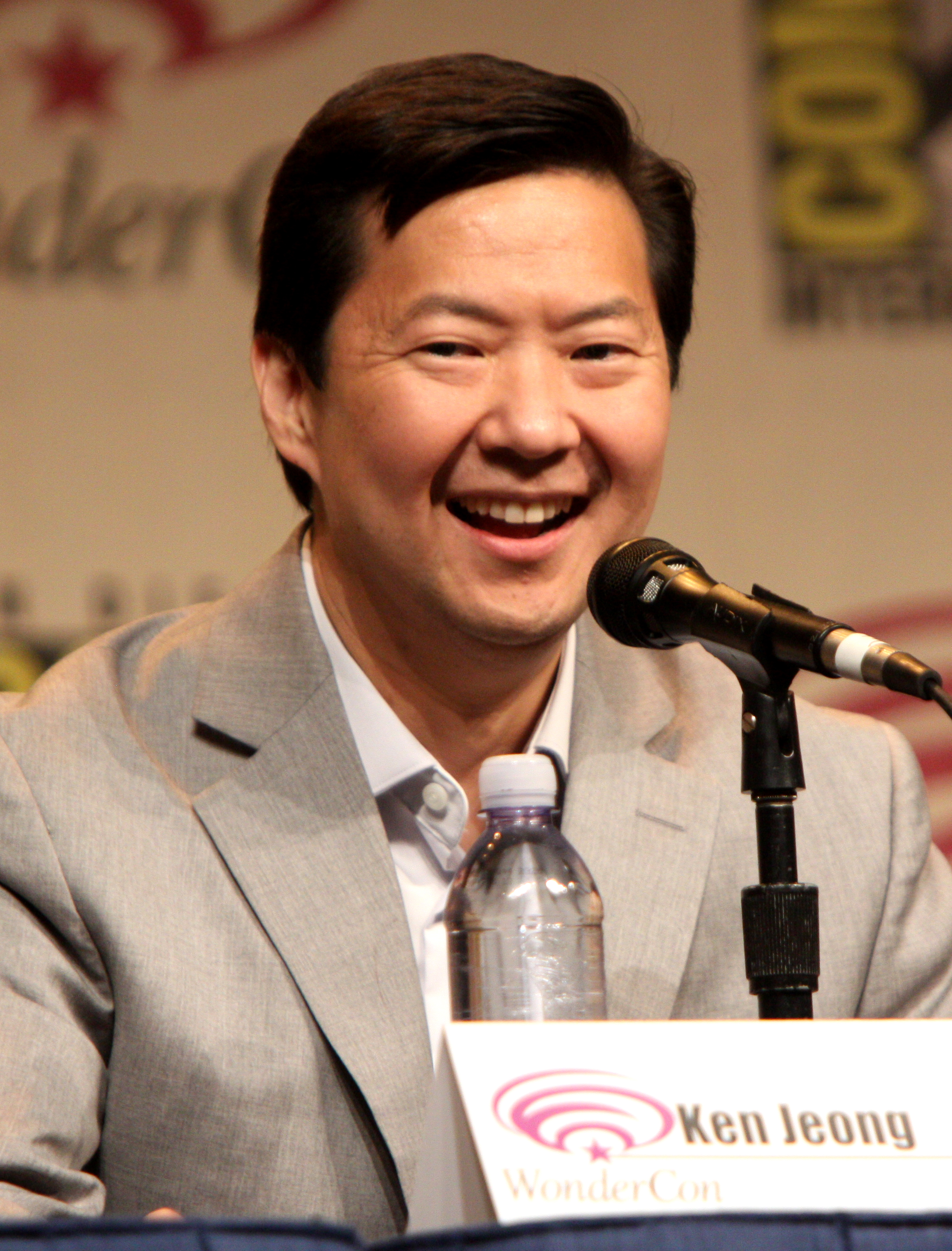
Ken Jeong

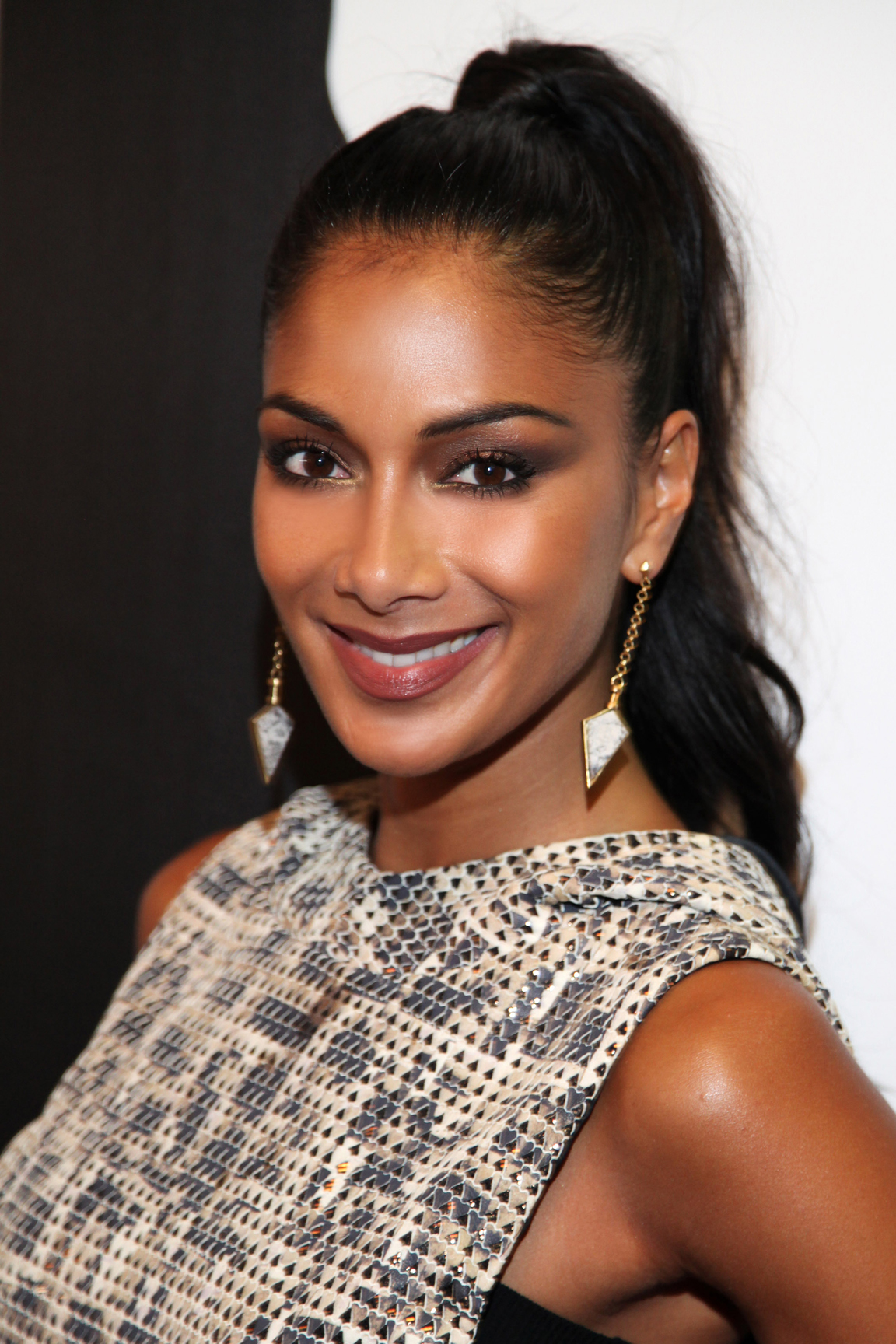
Nicole Scherzinger

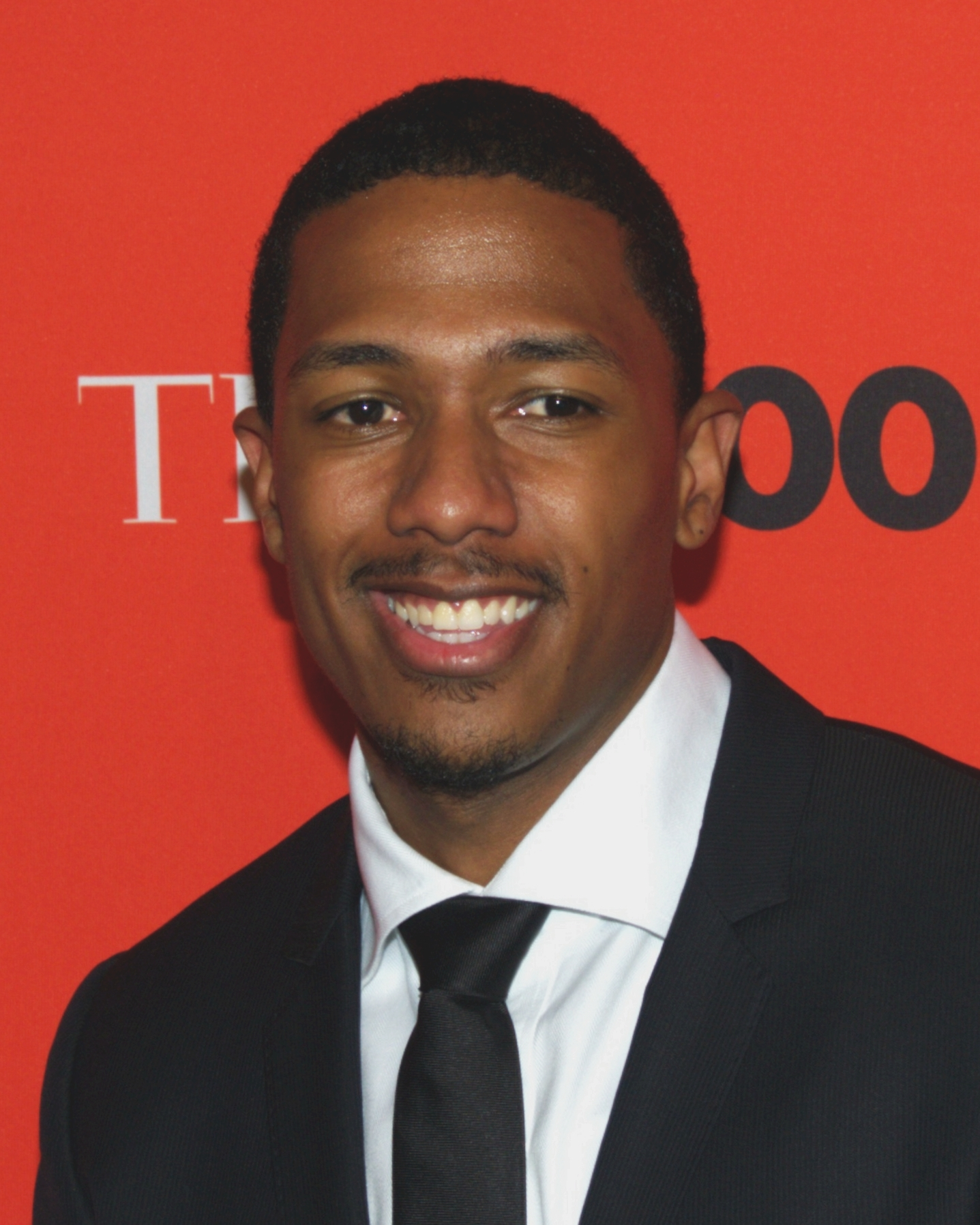
Nick Cannon

Nick Cannon, singer-songwriter Robin Thicke, television and radio personality Jenny McCarthy Wahlberg, actor and comedian Ken Jeong, and recording artist Nicole Scherzinger all return as host and panelists. Jeong did not appear in the seventh episode as he had tested positive for COVID-19 at the time.

The first episode featured Will Arnett who appeared in a cameo before the first king/queen crowning, the second episode included season one runner-up Donny Osmond as a guest panelist, with the Blue Man Group and Carrot Top as additional guests, the third episode featured Jodie Sweetin and season one contestant Tori Spelling as additional guests, the fourth episode featured Andrew Lloyd Webber as a guest panelist, the fifth episode featured The Muppets, with Miss Piggy as a guest panelist, as well as season five contestant Kermit the Frog, Animal, Fozzie Bear, and others appearing as additional guests, the sixth episode featured Tag Team, Danielle Fishel, and Lance Bass as additional guests, the seventh episode featured Leslie Jordan and Joel McHale (filling in for an absent Jeong) as guest panelists, with Sheila E. as an additional guest, and the eighth episode featured Jon Lovitz and season three contestant Drew Carey as additional guests.

Leslie Jordan, a guest panelist in the seventh episode aired on November 9, was killed in a car accident on October 24, 2022, marking the first posthumous appearance in the series. The episode was dedicated in his honor, including a tribute at the beginning and end of the episode.

== Production ==
On May 16, 2022, it was announced that Fox renewed the series for an eighth season, prior to the airing of the seventh season's finale on May 18. On June 6, 2022, it was announced that the season would premiere on September 21.

The formatting for the season sees three contestants battle in each episode, with one eliminated mid-show and taken to the VIP section while the other two battle out. A king/queen is crowned at the end of each episode who then moves on to the following episode, while the other in the top two gets eliminated. The season also includes themed nights for the first time, including "Vegas Night", "Comedy Roast", "Hall of Fame", "Muppets Night", "Andrew Lloyd Webber Night", "TV Themes", "'90s Night", "Thanksgiving", and "Fright Night".

Numerous episodes during the season were rescheduled due to the Major League Baseball playoffs. The first took place on October 12, when game two of the NLDS between the Philadelphia Phillies and the Atlanta Braves suffered a rain delay with game play resuming during primetime on the east coast. Consequently, the airing of the Andrew Lloyd Webber episode was pre-empted nationally. However, it aired on CTV in Canada as scheduled. The season was further delayed by the World Series, when a necessary game five took out another air date (November 2). Following a rainout of game three, the remainder of the World Series schedule was pushed back a day, placing a potential game seven on the next scheduled air date (November 6), though only six games were played in the World Series.

The sing-a-long holiday special included a dedication for actor Kirstie Alley, who died on December 5, 2022. Alley portrayed "Baby Mammoth" in the previous season.

== Contestants ==
Following her death, it was reported that actor Anne Heche had been in negotiations to participate in the season, though it is unclear how far she was in the process.

The season features 22 contestants, the highest number of contestants on any American season of The Masked Singer. The contestants in this season are reported to have a combined 42 books, 32 Grammy nominations, 16 Emmy wins, 10 Teen Choice Awards, eight gold albums, five stars on the Hollywood Walk of Fame, and four Golden Globe nominations.

Results
Stage name	Celebrity	Occupation(s)	Episodes										
Stage name	Celebrity	Occupation(s)	1	2	3	4	5	6	7	8	9	10	12
Stage name	Celebrity	Occupation(s)	Round 1			Round 2			Round 3			10	12
Harp	Amber Riley	Actor/singer	WIN	WIN	WIN							SAFE	WINNER
Lambs	Wilson Phillips	Vocal group					WIN	WIN				SAFE	RUNNERS-UP
Snowstorm	Nikki Glaser	Comedian/TV host								WIN	WIN	OUT	
Sir Bug a Boo	Ray Parker Jr.	Singer									OUT		
Scarecrow	Linda Blair	Actor/activist									WD (Note: Blair forfeited before the vote was revealed by Cannon.)		
Avocado	Adam Carolla	Actor/comedian								OUT			
Bride	Chris Jericho	Professional wrestler							WIN	OUT			
Gopher	George Clinton	Singer/bandleader							OUT				
Venus Fly Trap	George Foreman	Retired boxer							OUT				
Milkshake	Le'Veon Bell	NFL player						OUT					
Walrus	Joey Lawrence	Actor/singer						OUT					
Robo Girl	Kat Graham	Actor/singer				WIN	OUT						
Beetle	Jerry Springer	TV host					OUT						
Mermaid	Gloria Gaynor	Singer				OUT							
Maize	Mario Cantone	Actor/comedian				OUT							
Fortune Teller	Daymond John	Businessman			OUT								
Mummies	Mike Lookinland	Actor			OUT								
Mummies	Barry Williams	Actor			OUT								
Mummies	Christopher Knight	Actor			OUT								
Panther	Montell Jordan	Singer		OUT									
Pi-Rat	Jeff Dunham	Ventriloquist/comedian		OUT									
Hummingbird	Chris Kirkpatrick	Singer	OUT (Note: While eliminated in the first episode, Hummingbird was unmasked at the beginning of the second episode.)										
Hedgehog	Eric Idle	Actor/comedian	OUT										
Knight	William Shatner	Actor	OUT										

- WIN The masked singer won with their performance and advanced in the competition.
- SAFE The masked singer was safe from elimination.
- OUT The masked singer was eliminated from the competition and unmasked.
- WD The masked singer forfeited and left the competition.
- The masked singer did not perform.
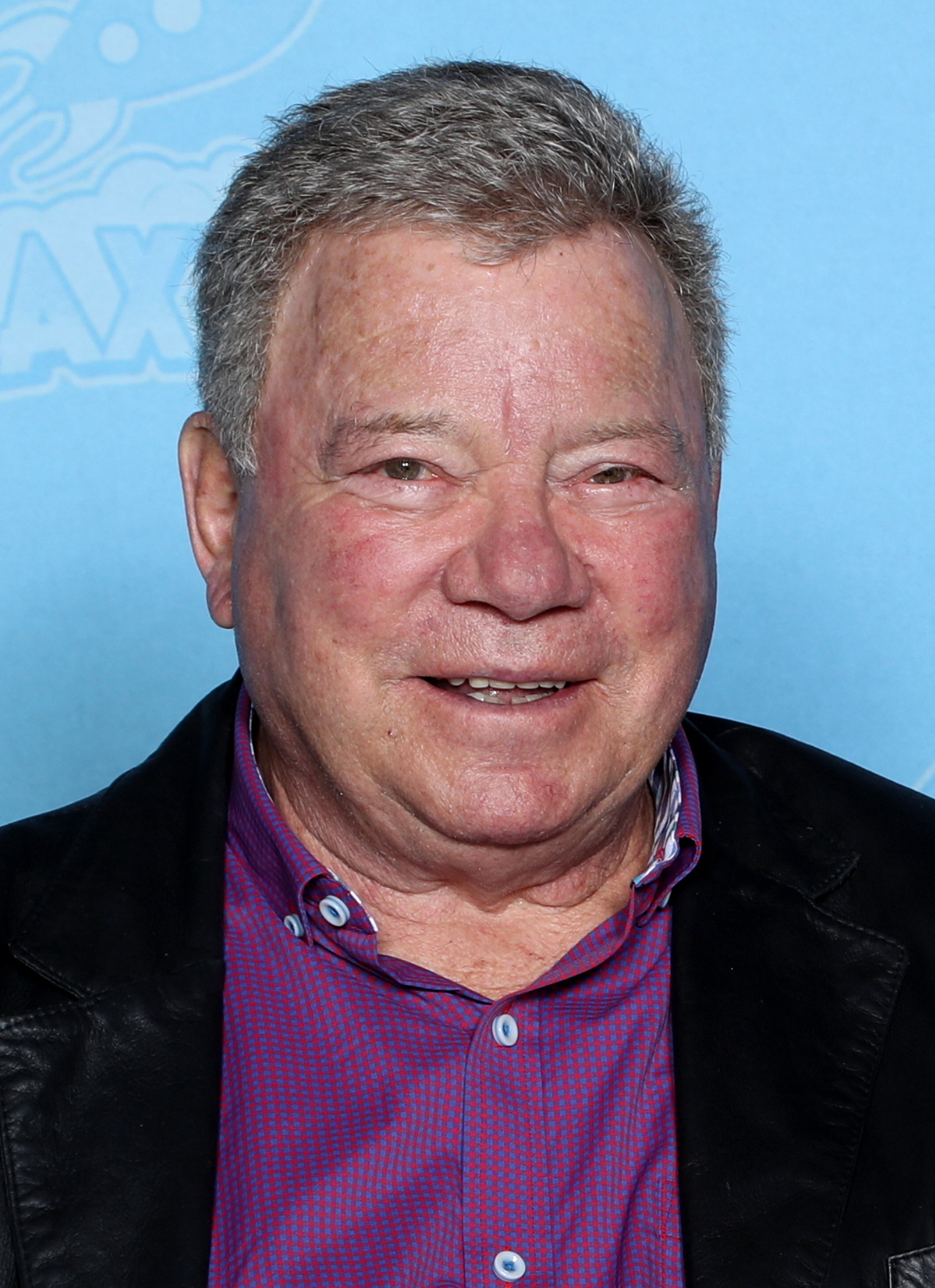
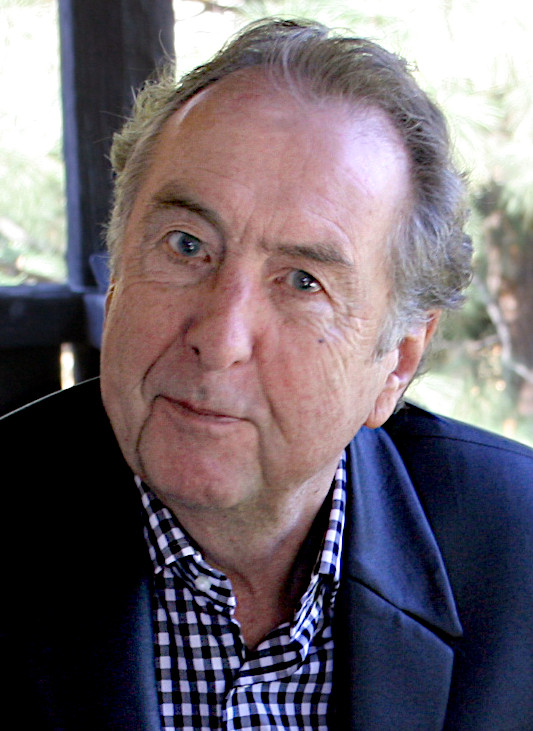
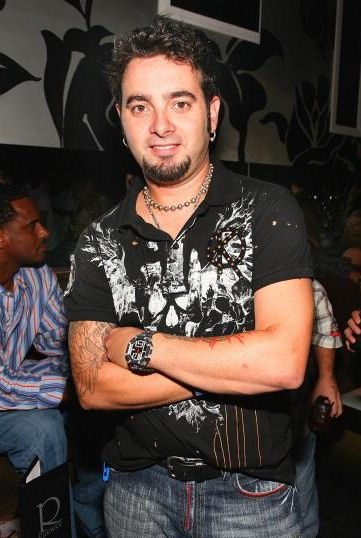
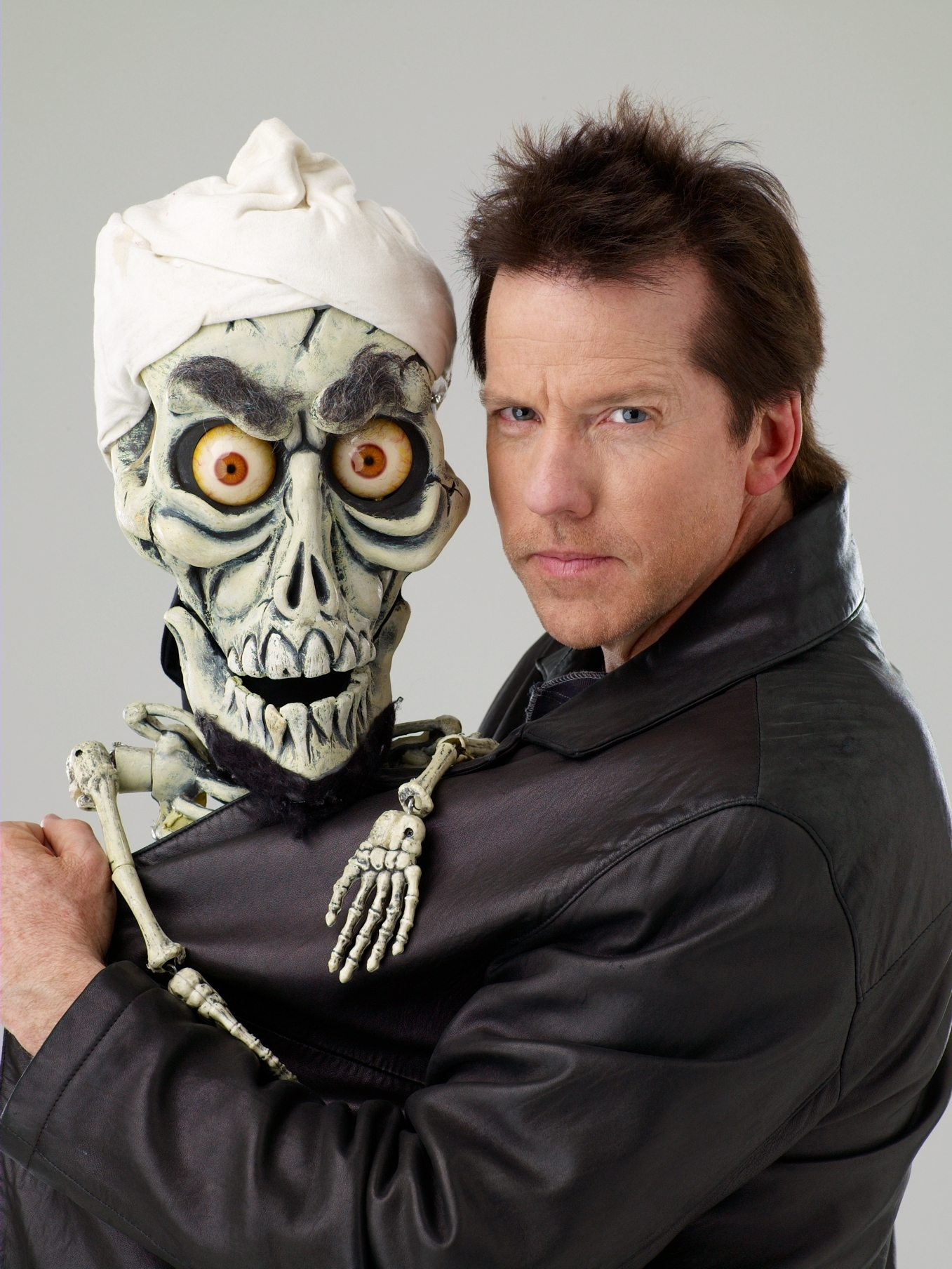
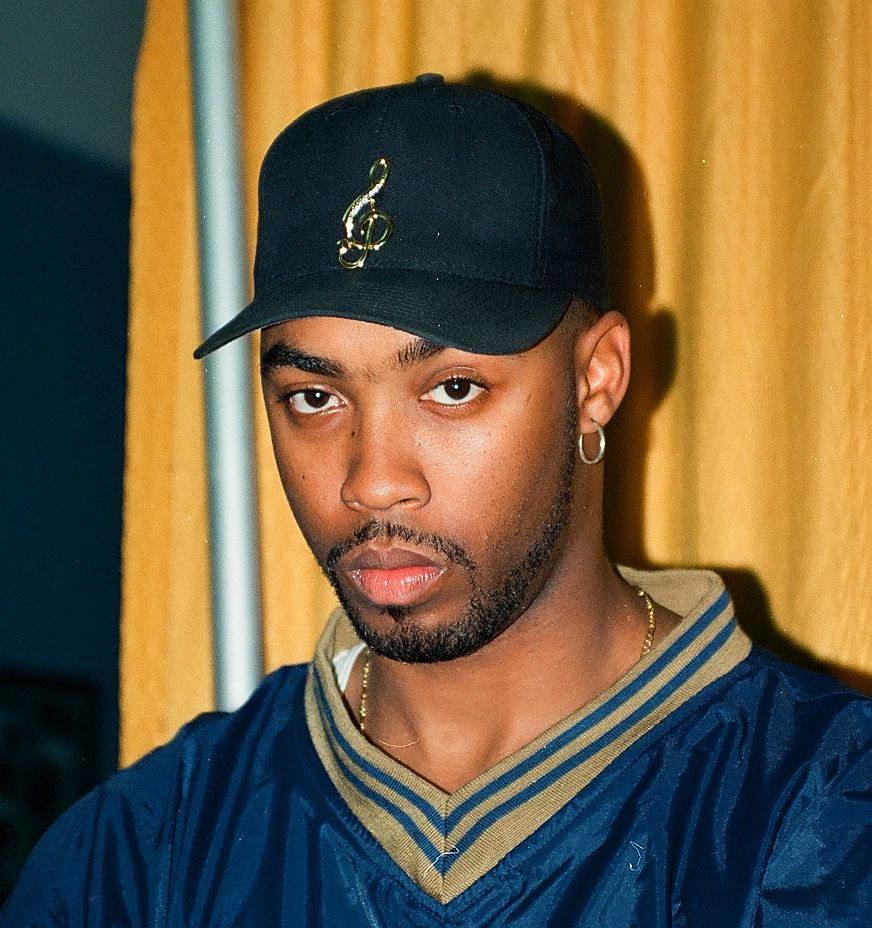
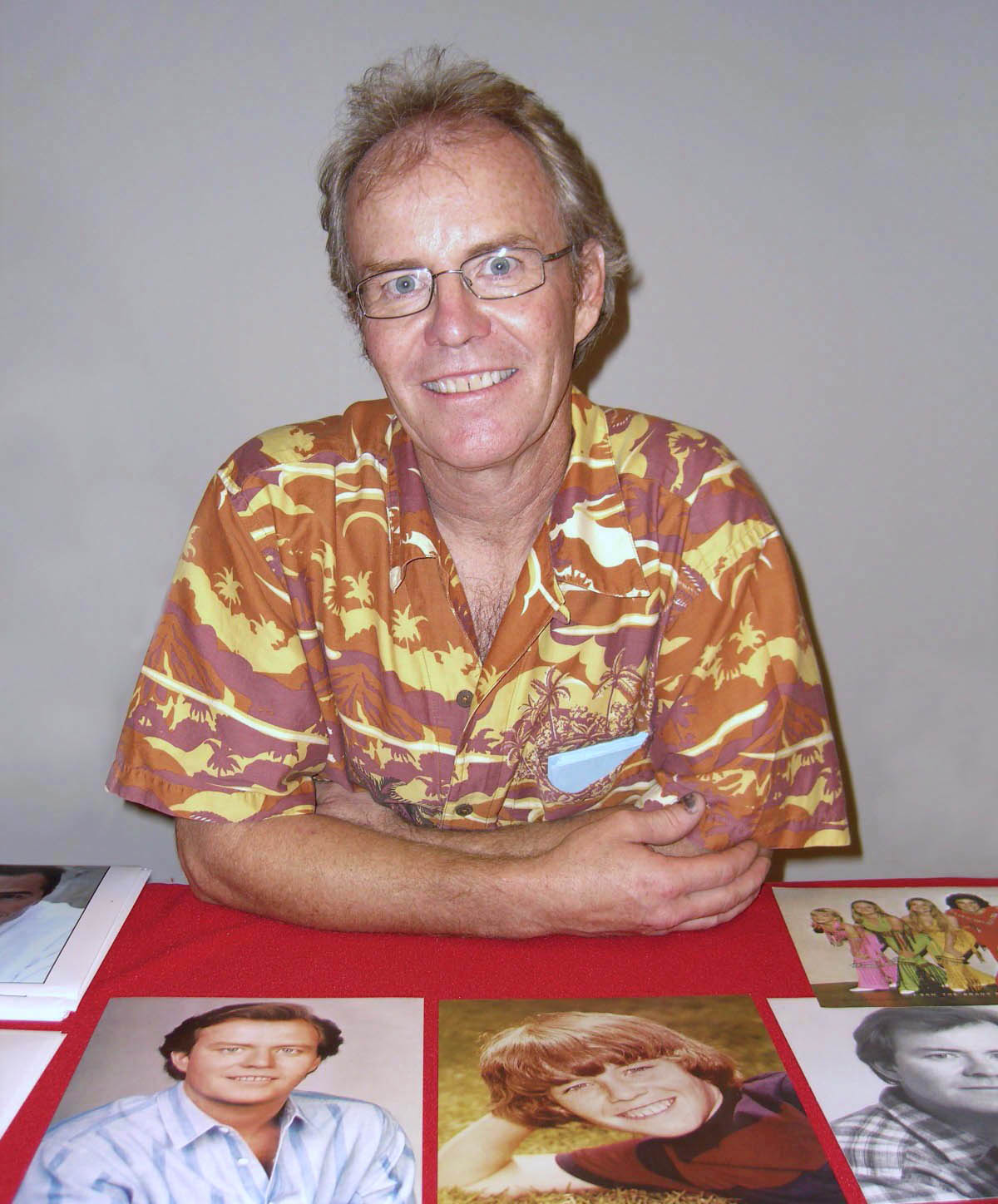
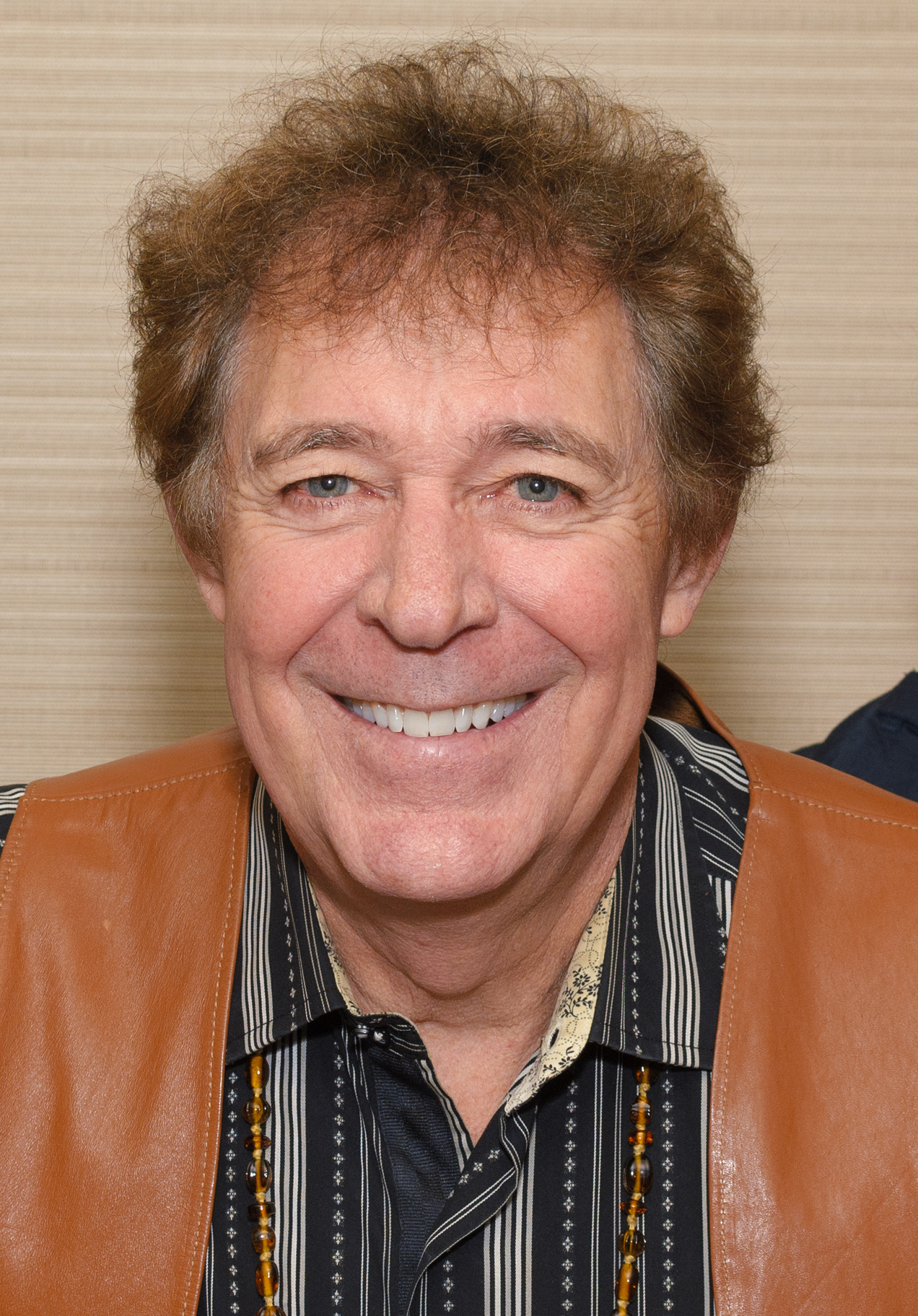
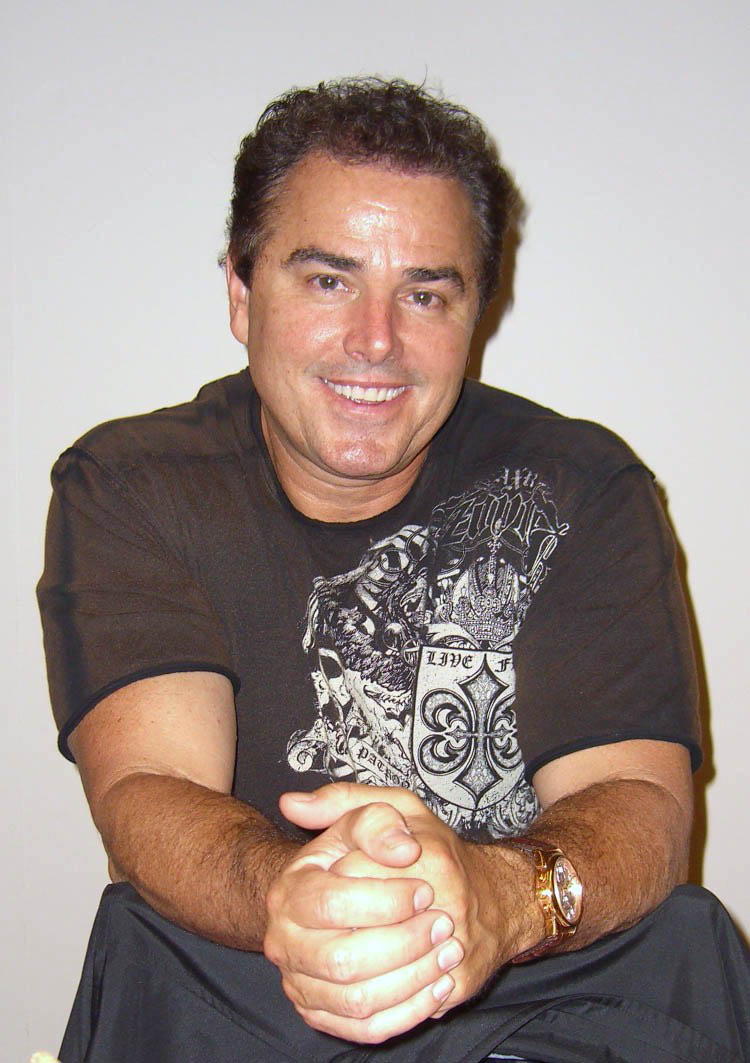
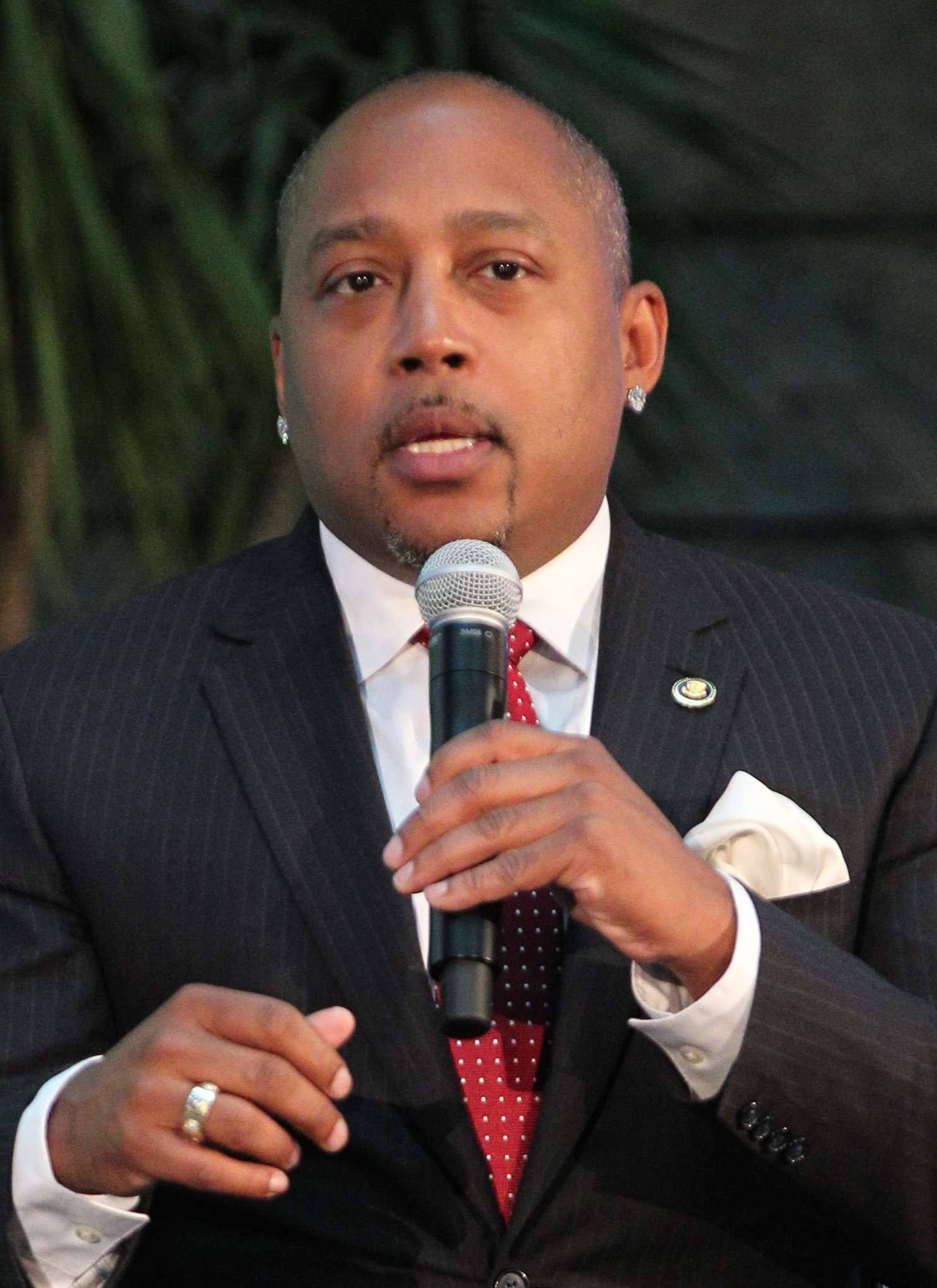
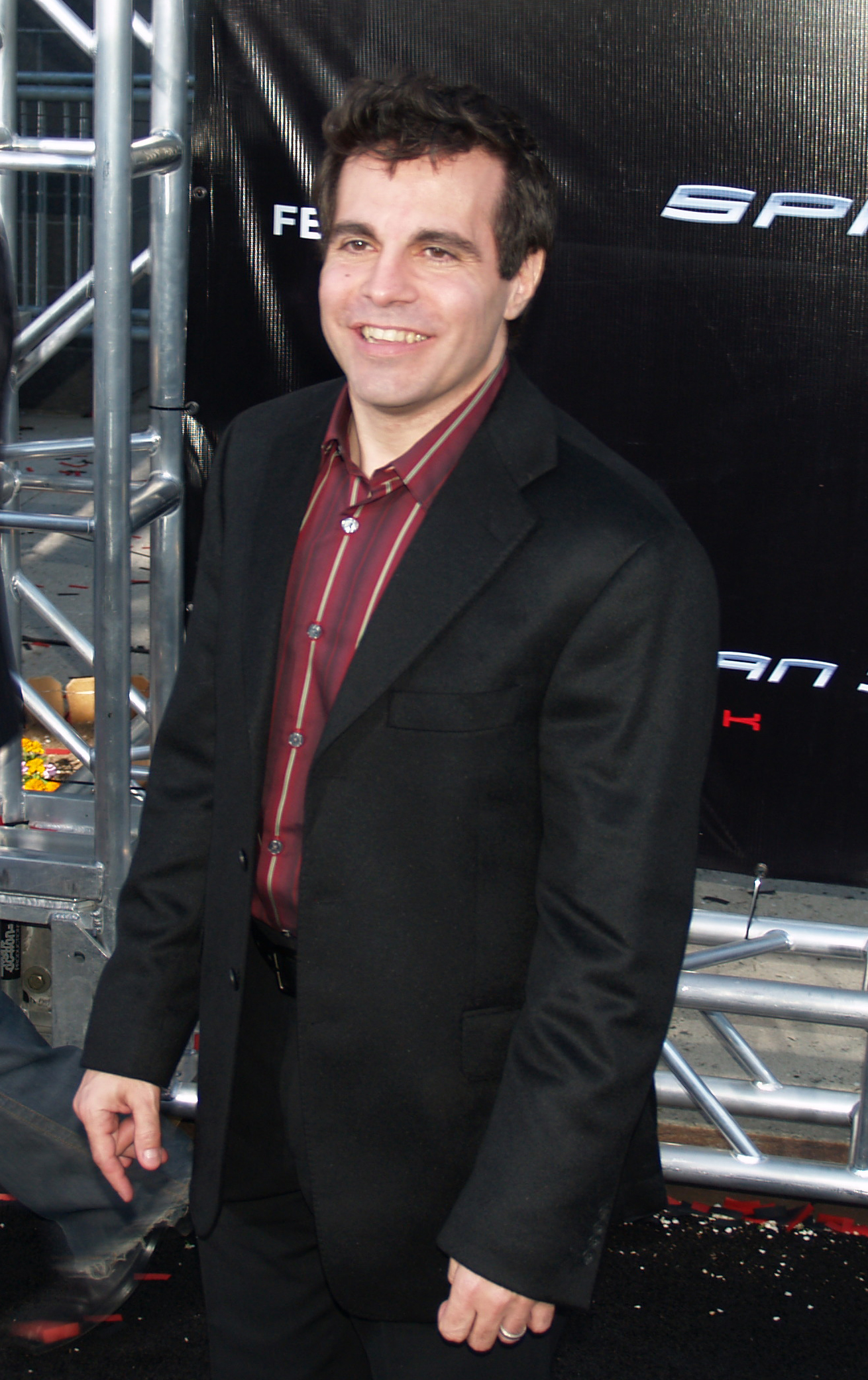
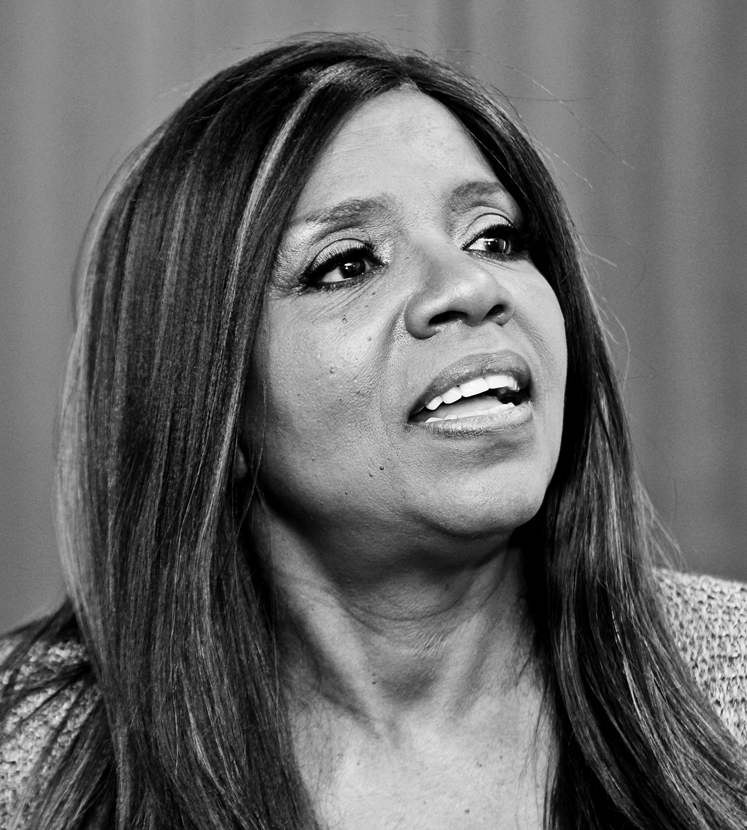
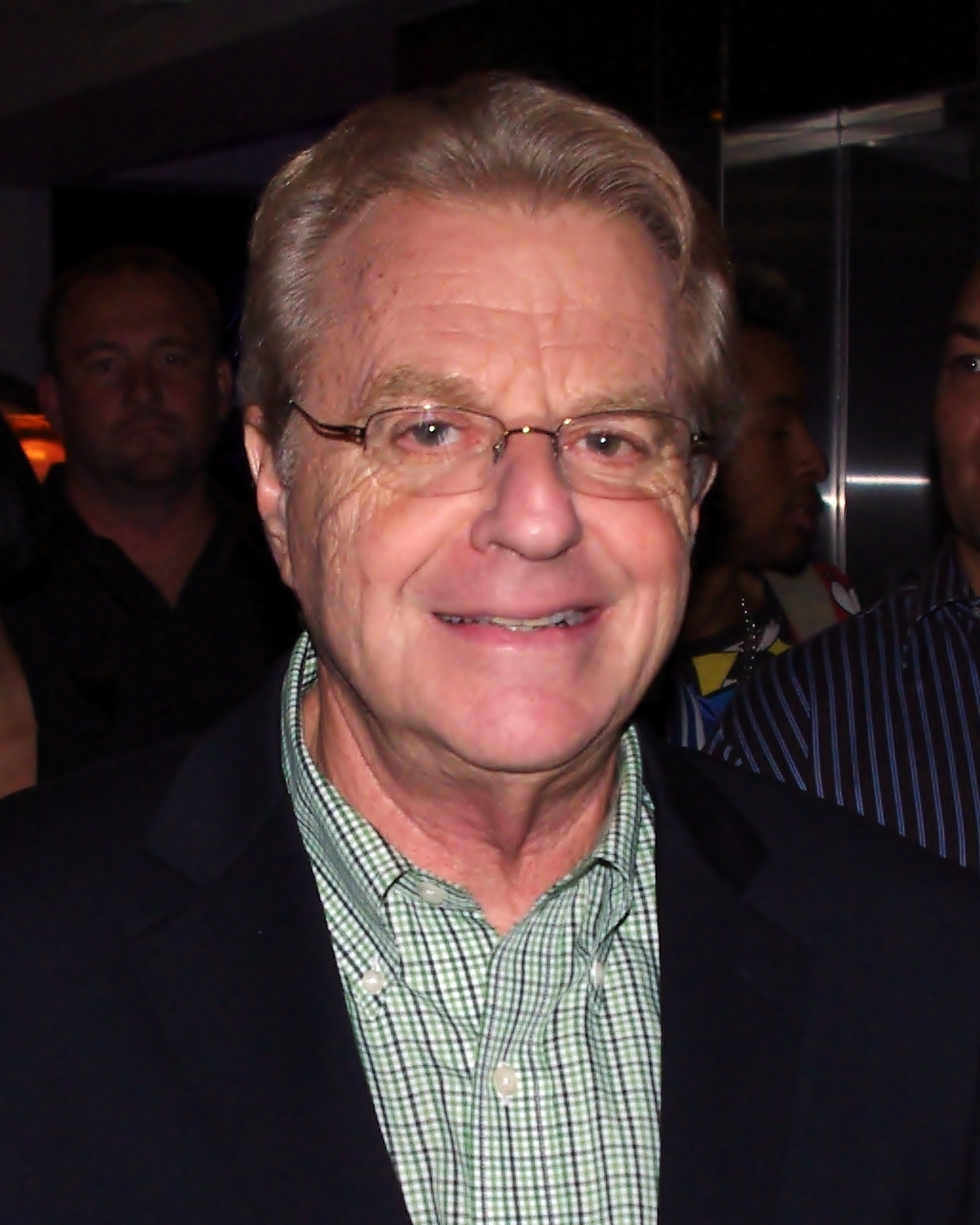
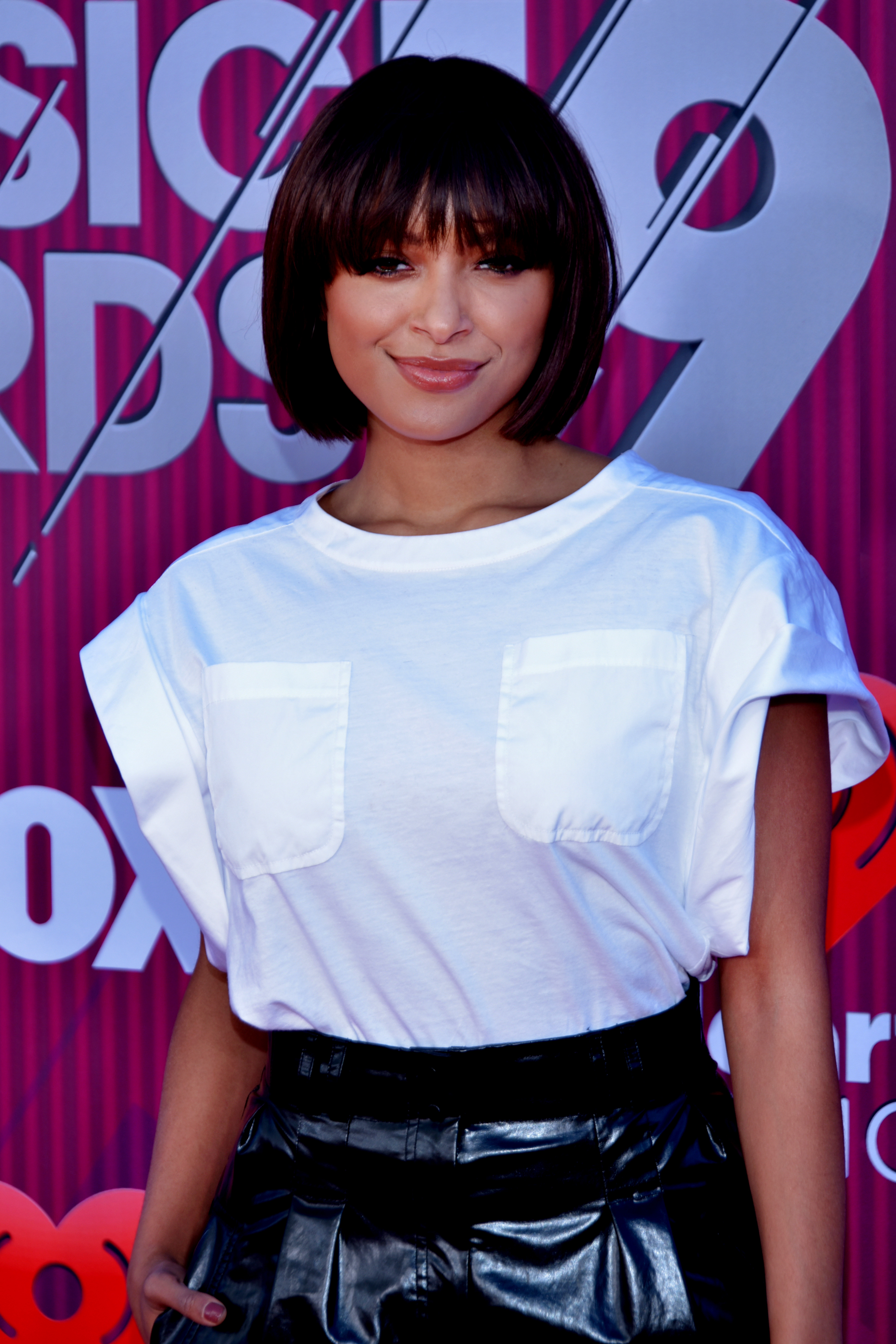
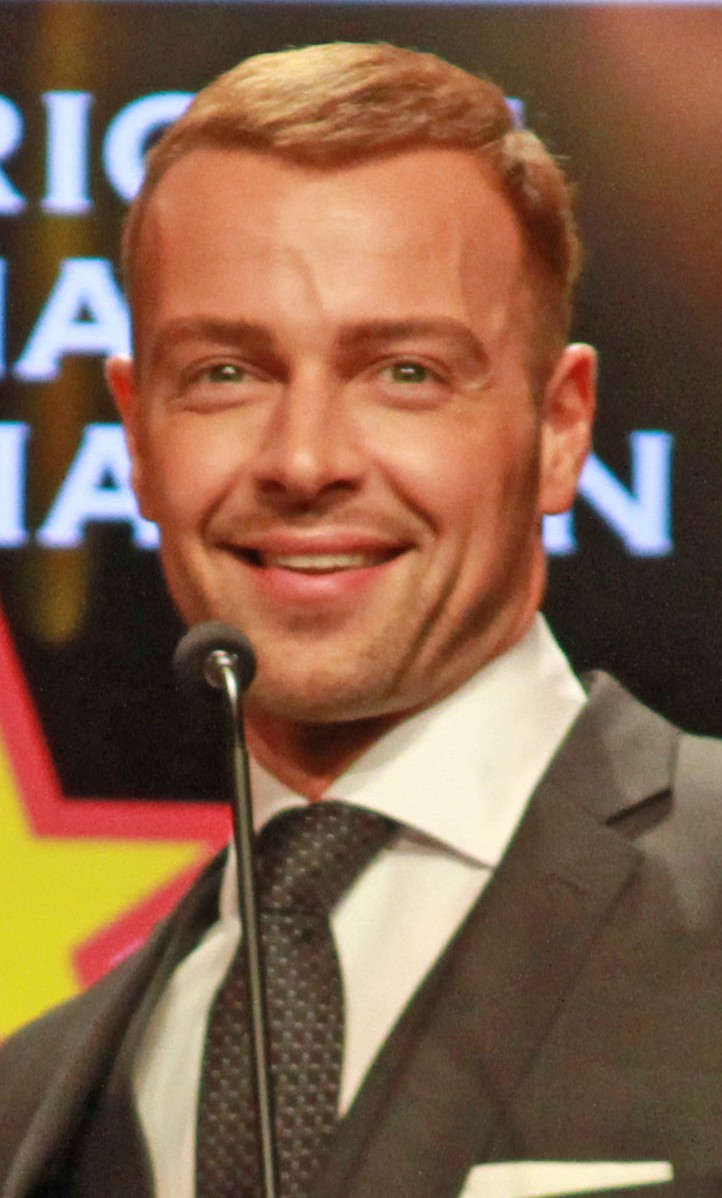
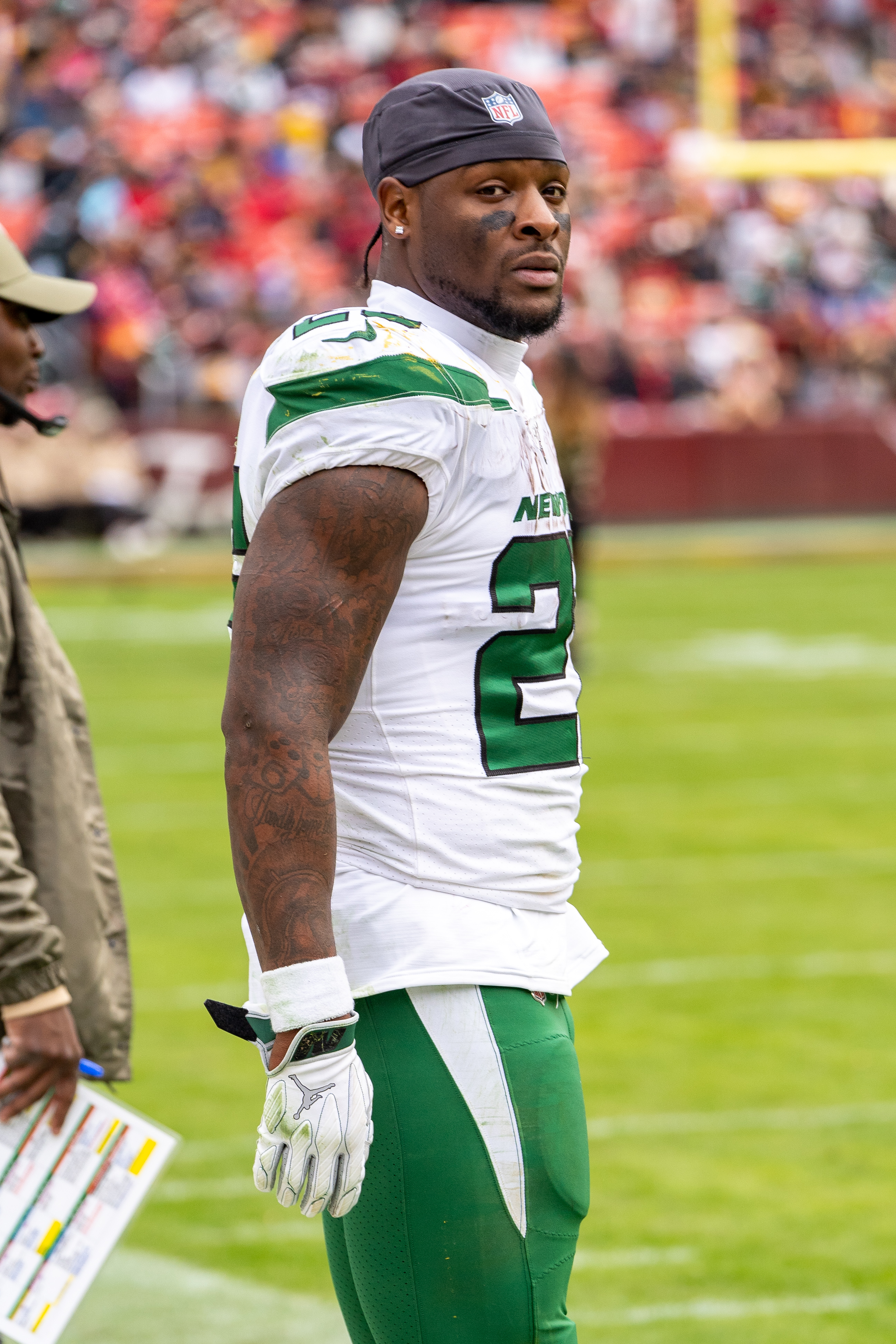
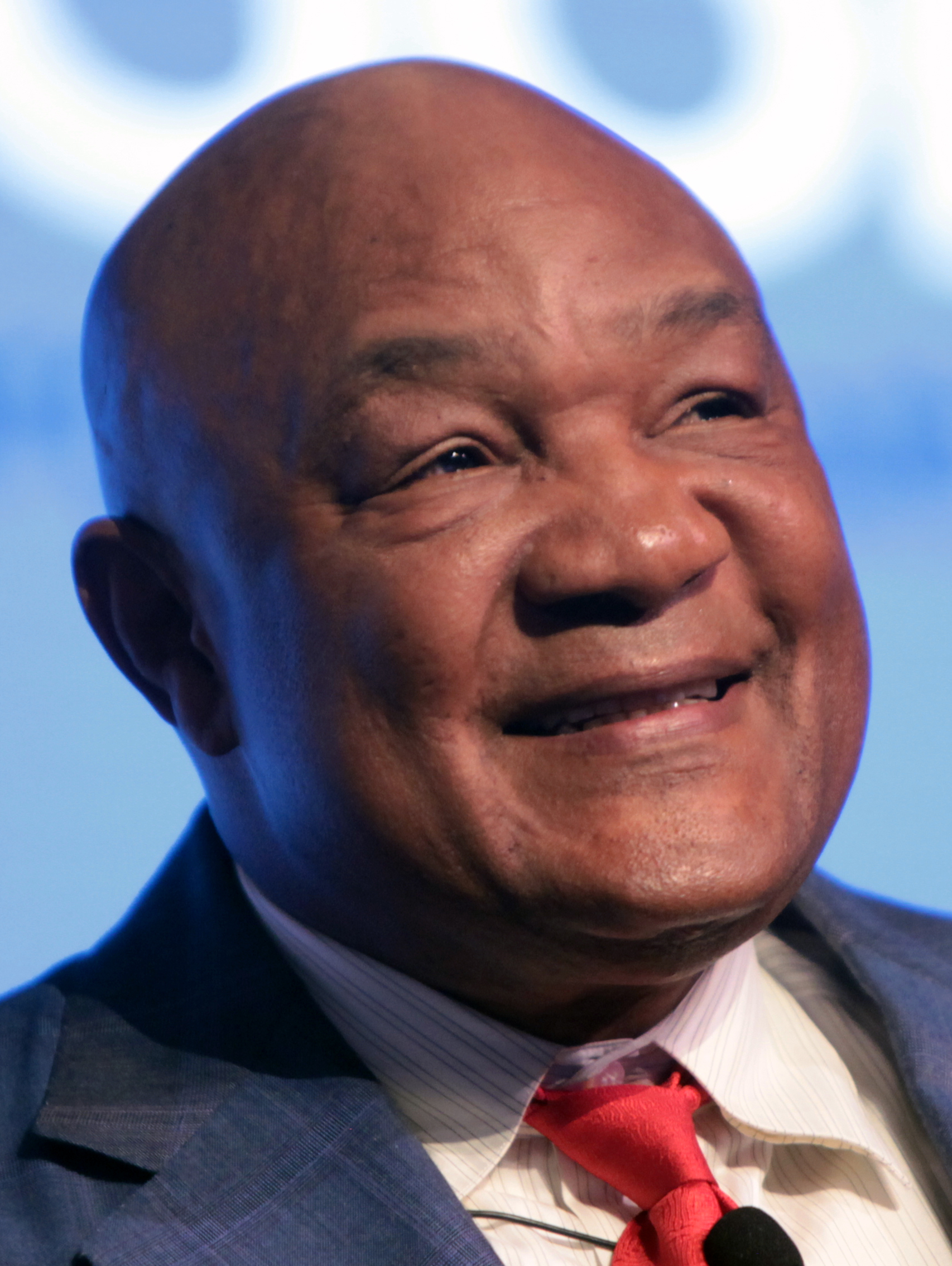
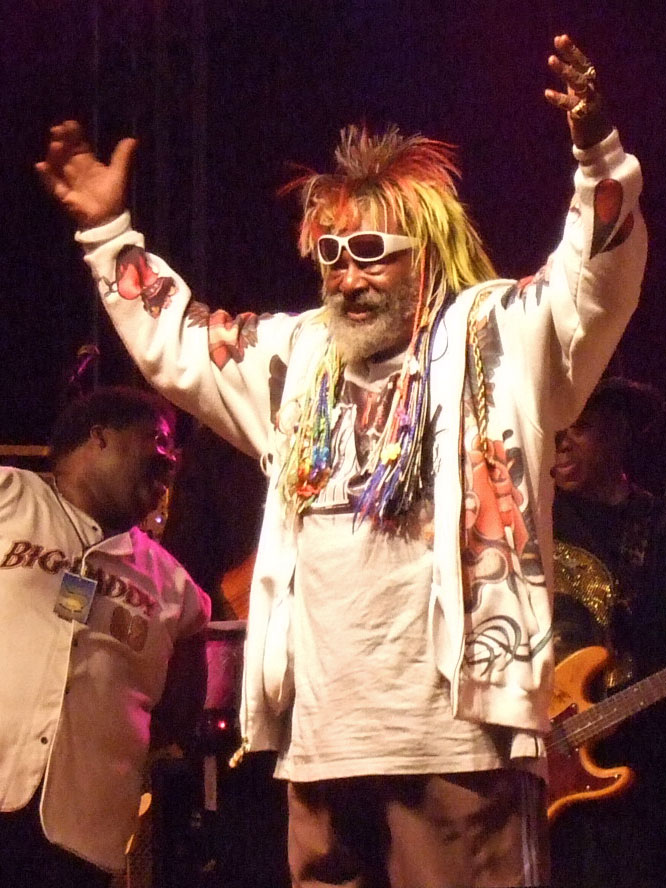
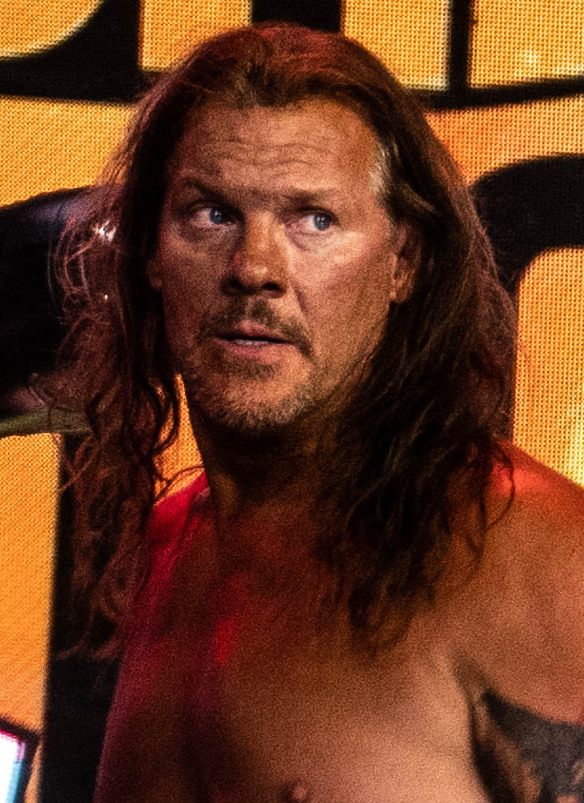
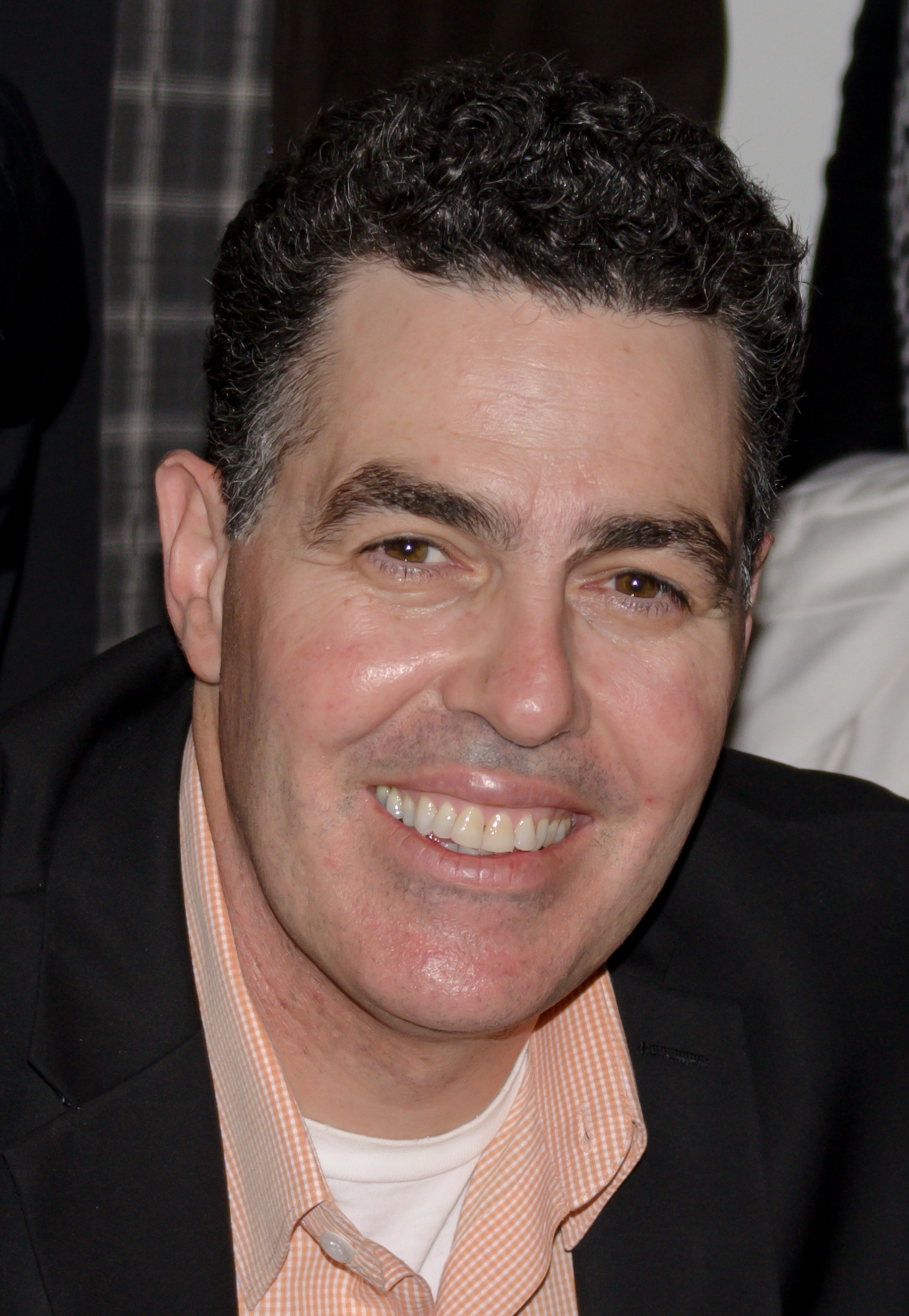
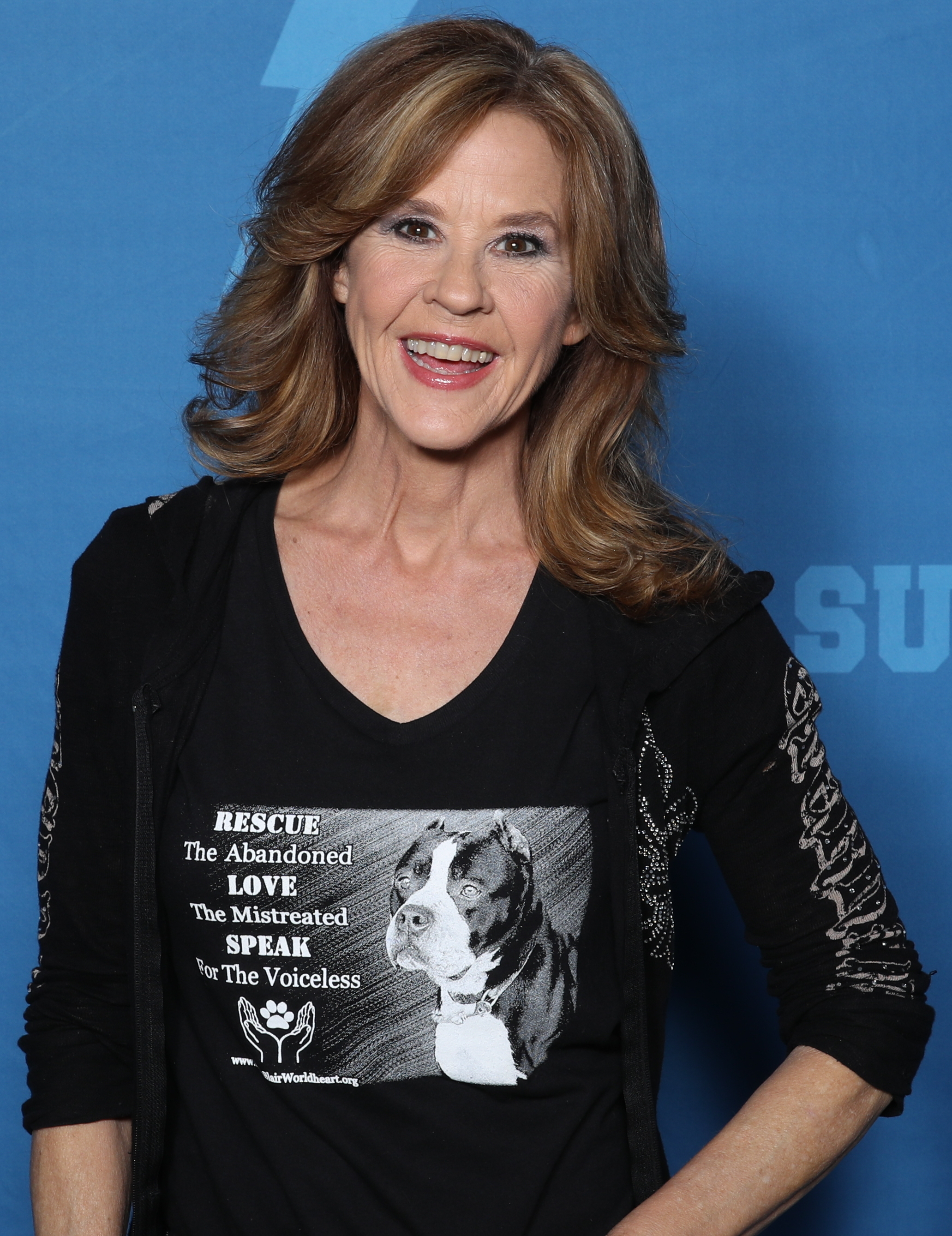
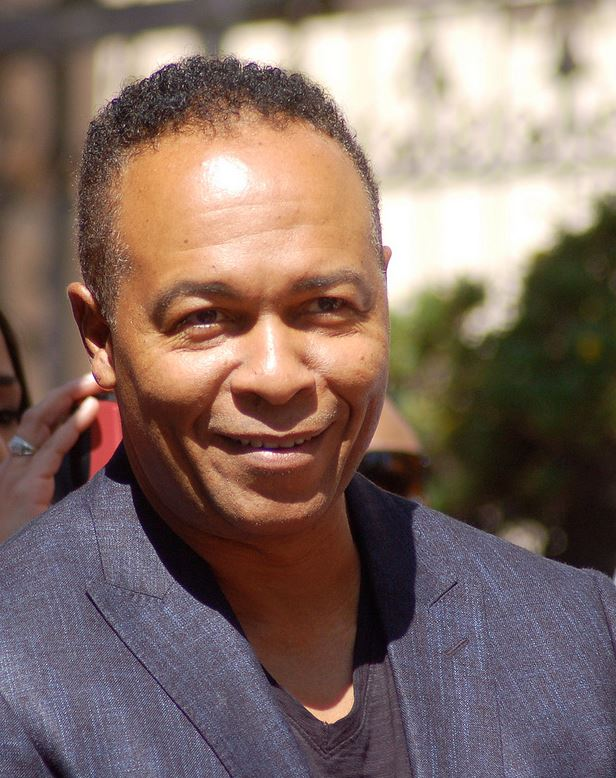
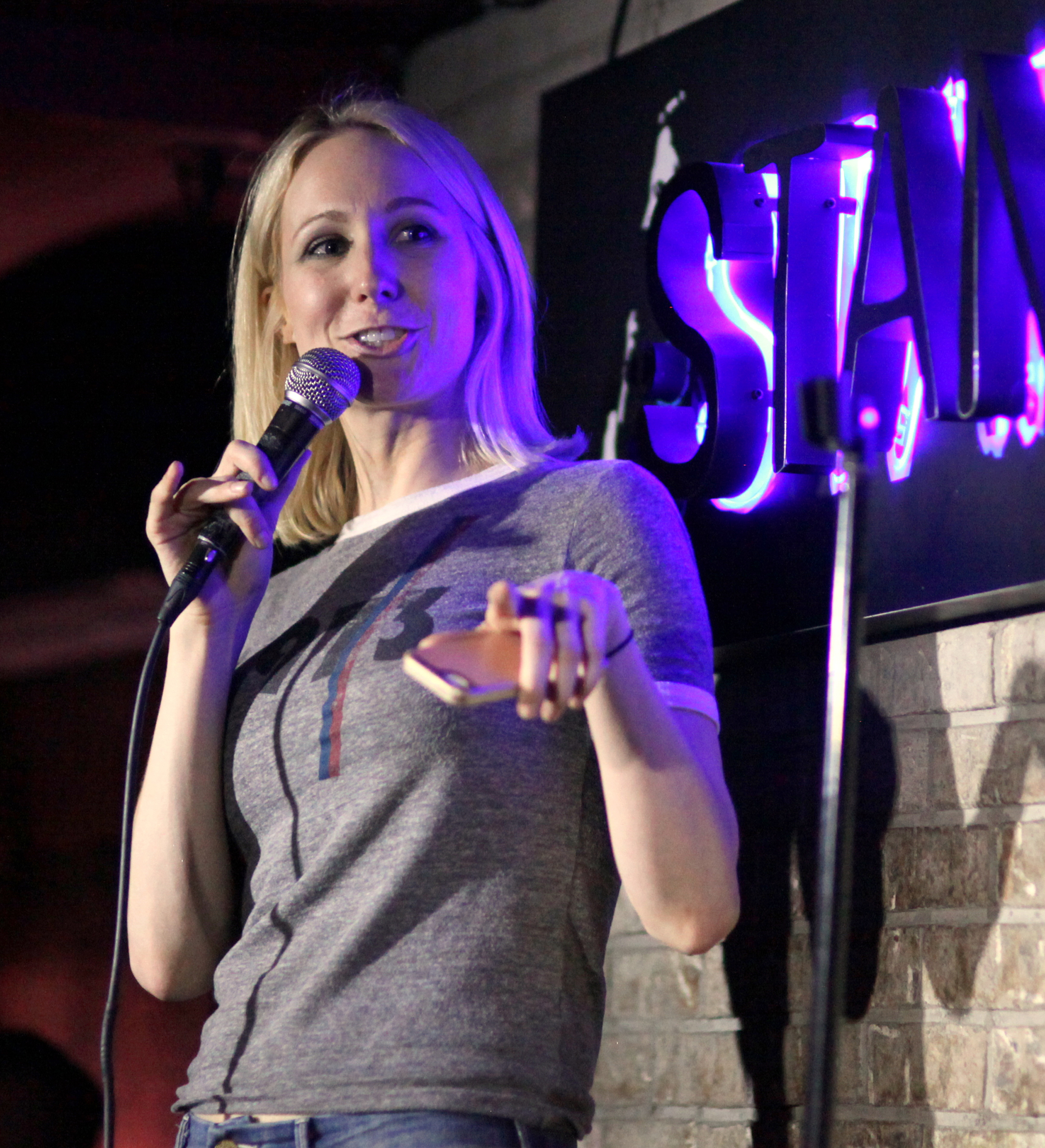
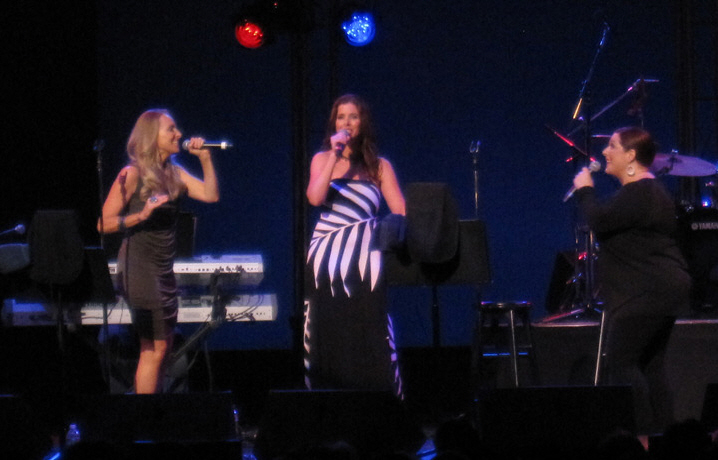
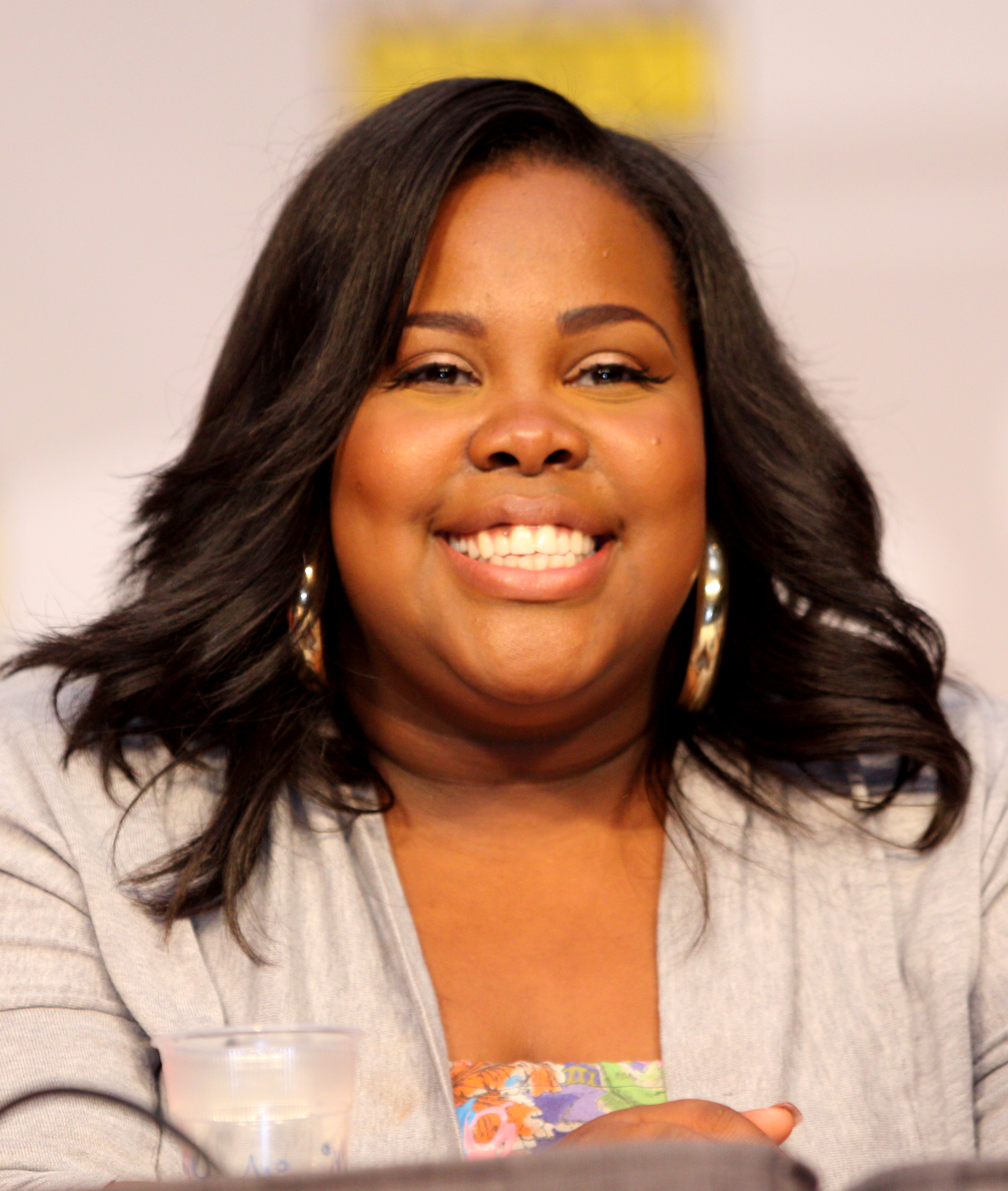
The celebrities who competed in the eighth season of The Masked Singer, pictured in order of elimination (L–R):
William Shatner ("Knight"), Eric Idle ("Hedgehog"), Chris Kirkpatrick ("Hummingbird"), Jeff Dunham ("Pi-Rat"), Montell Jordan ("Panther"), Mike Lookinland, Barry Williams, and Christopher Knight ("Mummies"), Daymond John ("Fortune Teller"), Mario Cantone ("Maize"), Gloria Gaynor ("Mermaid"), Jerry Springer ("Beetle"), Kat Graham ("Robo Girl"), Joey Lawrence ("Walrus"), Le'Veon Bell ("Milkshake"), George Foreman ("Venus Fly Trap"), George Clinton ("Gopher"), Chris Jericho ("Bride"), Adam Carolla ("Avocado"), Linda Blair ("Scarecrow"), Ray Parker Jr. ("Sir Bug a Boo"), Nikki Glaser ("Snowstorm"), Wilson Phillips ("Lambs"), and Amber Riley ("Harp")

== Episodes ==
=== Week 1 (September 21) ===
The USC Trojan Marching Band served as musical accompaniment for Hedgehog's performance in this episode.

Performances on the first episode
#	Stage name	Song	Identity	Result
1	Harp	"Perfect" by P!nk	undisclosed	WIN
2	Hedgehog	"Love Me Do" by The Beatles	Eric Idle	OUT
3	Hummingbird	"I Don't Want to Be" by Gavin DeGraw	Chris Kirkpatrick	OUT
4	Knight	"Puttin' On the Ritz" by Fred Astaire	William Shatner	OUT

- After being unmasked, Idle sang his signature song "Always Look on the Bright Side of Life" from Life of Brian.

=== Week 2 (September 28) - "Vegas Night" ===
- Guest performance: Guest panelist Donny Osmond performs a medley of "The Greatest Show" from The Greatest Showman and "Viva Las Vegas" by Elvis Presley

Performances on the second episode
#	Stage name	Song	Identity	Result
1	Panther	"Feeling Good" by Nina Simone	undisclosed	SAFE
2	Pi-Rat	"Crocodile Rock" by Elton John	Jeff Dunham	OUT
3	Harp	"I Have Nothing" by Whitney Houston	undisclosed	SAFE
Battle Royale
4	Panther	"Born to Be Wild" by Steppenwolf	Montell Jordan	OUT
4	Harp	"Born to Be Wild" by Steppenwolf	undisclosed	WIN

- After being unmasked, Jordan performed his hit "This Is How We Do It" as his encore performance.

=== Week 3 (October 5) - "TV Theme Night" ===
- Guest performance: Panelist Robin Thicke performs "As Long As We Got Each Other" by B. J. Thomas (from Growing Pains)

Performances on the third episode
#	Stage name	Song	Identity	Result
1	Mummies	"The Monkees" - The Monkees theme song	Mike Lookinland	OUT
1	Mummies	"The Monkees" - The Monkees theme song	Barry Williams	OUT
1	Mummies	"The Monkees" - The Monkees theme song	Christopher Knight	OUT
2	Fortune Teller	"Movin' On Up" - The Jeffersons theme song	undisclosed	SAFE
3	Harp	"Thank You for Being a Friend" - The Golden Girls theme song	undisclosed	SAFE
Battle Royale
4	Fortune Teller	"Everywhere You Look" - Full House theme song	Daymond John	OUT
4	Harp	"Everywhere You Look" - Full House theme song	undisclosed	WIN

- After their unmasking, Lookinland, Williams, and Knight sang "It's a Sunshine Day" from The Brady Bunch.

=== Week 4 (October 19) - "Andrew Lloyd Webber Night" ===
- Guest performance: Panelist Nicole Scherzinger performs "Memory" from Cats

Performances on the fourth episode
#	Stage name	Song	Identity	Result
1	Maize	"Heaven on Their Minds" from Jesus Christ Superstar	Mario Cantone	OUT
2	Mermaid	"Any Dream Will Do" from Joseph and the Amazing Technicolor Dreamcoat	undisclosed	SAFE
3	Robo Girl	"Bad Cinderella" from Bad Cinderella	undisclosed	SAFE
Battle Royale
4	Mermaid	"Don't Cry for Me Argentina" from Evita	Gloria Gaynor	OUT
4	Robo Girl	"Don't Cry for Me Argentina" from Evita	undisclosed	WIN

- After being unmasked, Gaynor sang her signature song "I Will Survive" as her encore performance.

=== Week 5 (October 26) - "Muppets Night" ===
- Guest performance: Kermit the Frog with Nick Cannon and the panelists perform "Rainbow Connection"

Performances on the fifth episode
#	Stage name	Song	Identity	Result
1	Robo Girl	"Bohemian Rhapsody" by Queen (with Kermit on piano)	undisclosed	SAFE
2	Beetle	"The Way You Look Tonight" by Frank Sinatra	Jerry Springer	OUT
3	Lambs	"Hot n Cold" by Katy Perry	undisclosed	SAFE
Battle Royale
4	Robo Girl	"Call Me" by Blondie (with Animal on drums)	Kat Graham	OUT
4	Lambs	"Call Me" by Blondie (with Animal on drums)	undisclosed	WIN

=== Week 6 (November 6 and 9) - "90s Night" and "Hall of Fame Night" ===
- Guest performance: Tag Team performs "Whoomp! (There It Is)"

Performances on the sixth episode
#	Stage name	Song	Identity	Result
1	Walrus	"Two Princes" by Spin Doctors (1991)	Joey Lawrence	OUT
2	Milkshake	"Jump on It" by Sir Mix-a-Lot (1996)	undisclosed	SAFE
3	Lambs	"Ironic" by Alanis Morissette (1996)	undisclosed	SAFE
Battle Royale
4	Milkshake	"What Is Love" by Haddaway (1993)	Le'Veon Bell	OUT
4	Lambs	"What Is Love" by Haddaway (1993)	undisclosed	WIN

- Guest performance: Panelist Nicole Scherzinger performs "Fame" by Irene Cara

Performances on the seventh episode
#	Stage name	Song	Identity	Result
1	Bride	"Shut Up and Dance" by Walk the Moon	undisclosed	SAFE
2	Gopher	"It's Your Thing" by The Isley Brothers	undisclosed	SAFE
3	Venus Fly Trap	"Get Ready" by The Temptations	George Foreman	OUT
Battle Royale
4	Gopher	"All Star" by Smash Mouth (with Sheila E. on percussion)	George Clinton	OUT
4	Bride	"All Star" by Smash Mouth (with Sheila E. on percussion)	undisclosed	WIN

- After being unmasked, Clinton sang his signature song "Give Up the Funk (Tear the Roof Off the Sucker)" as his encore performance.

=== Week 7 (November 16) - "Comedy Roast Night" ===
Performances on the eighth episode
#	Stage name	Song	Identity	Result
1	Bride	"White Wedding" by Billy Idol	Chris Jericho	OUT
2	Snowstorm	"Thank U, Next" by Ariana Grande	undisclosed	SAFE
3	Avocado	"Hit the Road Jack" by Ray Charles	undisclosed	SAFE
Battle Royale
4	Avocado	"You're So Vain" by Carly Simon	Adam Carolla	OUT
4	Snowstorm	"You're So Vain" by Carly Simon	undisclosed	WIN

=== Week 8 (November 23 and 24) - "Fright Night" and "Battle of the Semi Finals" ===
Performances on the ninth episode
#	Stage name	Song	Identity	Result
1	Sir Bug a Boo	"Devil with the Blue Dress On" by Mitch Ryder and The Detroit Wheels	undisclosed	SAFE
2	Scarecrow	"Abracadabra" by The Steve Miller Band	Linda Blair	WD
3	Snowstorm	"Sweet but Psycho" by Ava Max	undisclosed	SAFE
Battle Royale
4	Snowstorm	"Somebody's Watching Me" by Rockwell	undisclosed	WIN
4	Sir Bug a Boo	"Somebody's Watching Me" by Rockwell	Ray Parker Jr.	OUT

- After being unmasked, Parker sang his signature song "Ghostbusters" as his encore performance.

Performances on the tenth episode
#	Stage name	Song	Identity	Result
1	Harp	"About Damn Time" by Lizzo	undisclosed	SAFE
2	Snowstorm	"Thinking of You" by Katy Perry	Nikki Glaser	OUT
3	Lambs	"Need You Now" by Lady A	undisclosed	SAFE
Battle Royale	"Since U Been Gone" by Kelly Clarkson			

=== Week 9 (November 30) - "Two Hour Epic Finale" ===
Performances on the twelfth episode
#	Stage name	Song	Identity	Result
1	Harp	"The Edge of Glory" by Lady Gaga	Amber Riley	WINNER
1	Harp	"Gravity" by John Mayer	Amber Riley	WINNER
2	Lambs	"I'm Every Woman" by Chaka Khan	Wilson Phillips	RUNNERS-UP
2	Lambs	"I Want to Know What Love Is" by Foreigner	Wilson Phillips	RUNNERS-UP

- After being unmasked, Wilson Phillips sang their signature song "Hold On" as their encore performance.

== Ratings ==
Viewership and ratings per episode of The Masked Singer (American TV series) season 8
No.	Title	Air date	Timeslot (ET)	Rating/share (18–49)	Viewers (millions)	DVR (18–49)	DVR viewers (millions)	Total (18–49)	Total viewers (millions)	Ref.
1	"A Royal Season Premiere"	September 21, 2022	Wednesday 8:00 p.m.	0.6/6	3.70	0.4	1.59	1.0	5.29	
2	"Vegas Night"	September 28, 2022	Wednesday 8:00 p.m.	0.7/6	3.89	0.3	1.44	1.0	5.36	
3	"TV Theme Night"	October 5, 2022	Wednesday 8:00 p.m.	0.7/6	4.17	0.3	1.27	0.9	5.44	
4	"Andrew Lloyd Webber Night"	October 19, 2022	Wednesday 8:43 p.m.	0.4/3	2.52	0.2	1.03	0.6	3.54	
5	"Muppets Night"	October 26, 2022	Wednesday 8:00 p.m.	0.7/6	4.20	0.3	1.24	1.0	5.44	
6	"90s Night"	November 6, 2022	Sunday 8:00 p.m.	0.5/4	2.78	0.3	1.44	0.8	4.22	
7	"Hall of Fame Night"	November 9, 2022	Wednesday 8:00 p.m.	0.6/5	3.16	0.3	1.31	0.9	4.47	
8	"Comedy Roast Night"	November 16, 2022	Wednesday 8:00 p.m.	0.6/5	3.71	0.3	1.39	0.9	5.10	
9	"Fright Night"	November 23, 2022	Wednesday 8:00 p.m.	0.6/6	3.67	0.2	0.95	0.8	4.62	(Note: Live+7 ratings were unavailable, so Live+3 ratings have been used instead.)
10	"Battle of the Semi Finals"	November 24, 2022	Thursday 8:10 p.m.	2.2/15	7.86	0.2	0.86	2.4	8.72	
11	"Two Hour Epic Finale Pt. 1"	November 30, 2022	Wednesday 8:00 p.m.	0.6/5	3.52	0.1	0.69	0.7	4.21	
12	"Two Hour Epic Finale Pt. 2"	November 30, 2022	Wednesday 9:00 p.m.	0.7/6	4.18	0.2	0.89	0.8	5.07	
Special	"Masked Singer Seasonal Sing-A-Long Spectacular!"	December 7, 2022	Wednesday 8:00 p.m.	0.3/3	2.04	0.0	0.30	0.3	2.35	
