= Black Entrepreneurs Day =

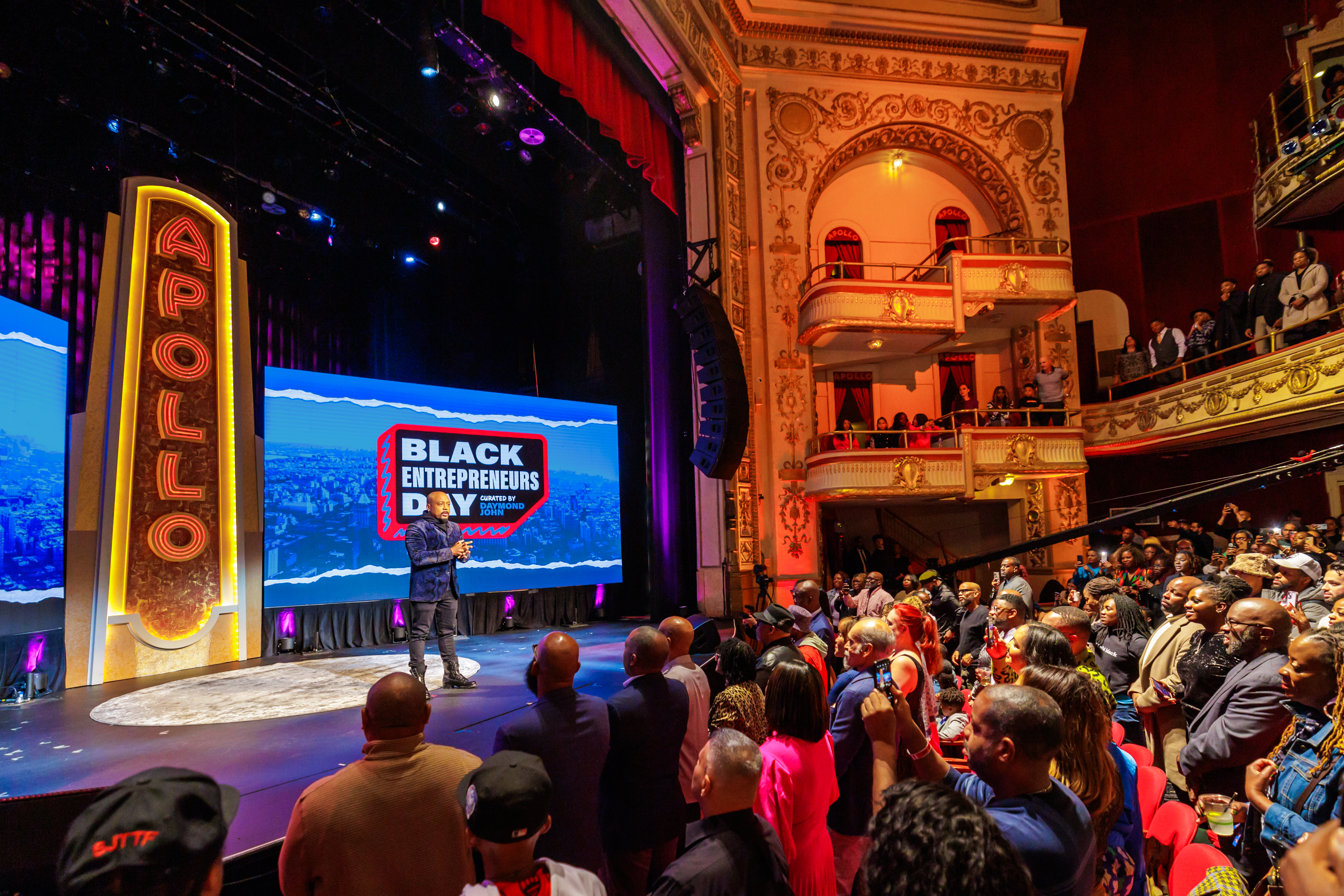
Daymond John speaking at 2023's Black Entrepreneurs Day.

Black Entrepreneurs Day is an annual livestream event created and hosted by Daymond John in partnership with Medium Rare production company, which was launched in 2020. It is filmed at the Apollo Theater in New York City.

The event provides funding for Black-owned businesses, and features celebrity speakers on the topic of entrepreneurship. The event has won two Webby Awards and two People’s Voice Award for the category “Virtual & Remote - Business & Finance” at the Webby Awards.

== History ==
The first annual Black Entrepreneurs Day was broadcast live online on October 24, 2020. It featured speakers such as Shaquille O’Neal, Gabrielle Union, LL Cool J, and Jamie Foxx. It also featured musical performances from artists such as Chance the Rapper and Questlove. The event also awarded $225,000 to selected entrepreneurs through NAACP Powershift Entrepreneur Grants.

The second Black Entrepreneurs Day event took place at the Apollo Theater, in New York City and was broadcast live on October 14, 2021. Guest speakers included Kevin Hart, Michael Strahan, Tyra Banks, and Rev Run. The event also featured a musical performance from Khalid. $250,000 in NAACP grants were awarded to Black-owned businesses at the event.

== Awards ==
The first iteration of the event won a Webby Award and a People’s Voice Award for the category “Virtual & Remote - Business & Finance” at the 2021 Webby Awards.

At the 2022 Webby Awards, the second iteration of the event won another Webby Award and People’s Voice Award for the category “Virtual & Remote - Business & Finance.” Medium Rare also received an Anthem Award for Diversity, Equity, and Inclusion for its work on the second Black Entrepreneurs Day event.
