= Tyke T =

American rapper

Tyrone Stroble (born July 23, 1986), also known professionally as Tyke T, is an American hip hop artist from Smyrna, Tennessee. In 2011, Tyke T relocated to Memphis, Tennessee, and in 2013 he released his debut EP The Overlooked through Driven By Music, his own imprint. In 2014, he won WHRK K97FM's "Next Big Thing" competition.

On January 17, 2017, Tyke T released his sophomore EP The Prelude. The EP charted at No. 14 on the Billboard HeatSeekers Album chart, as well as in the Top 50 of the Rap and R&B/Hip-Hop Albums charts.

Tyke T has performed as a supporting act for artists such as Yo Gotti, B.o.B., and Boosie Badazz. His music has also been featured in several television shows, including MTV's One Bad Choice, Starz's Power, Oxygen's Bad Girls Club, and VH1's Black Ink Crew and Love & Hip Hop Atlanta.
