= Black Ink Crew season 3 =

Black Ink Crew
- Season 3
- Cover used by the iTunes Store
- Starring: Ceaser Emanuel; Dutchess Lattimore; O'Shit Duncan; Puma Robinson; Sassy Bermudez; Sky Days
- No. of episodes: 21

Release
- Original network: VH1
- Original release: January 26 – October 19, 2015

Season chronology
- ← Previous; Season 2 Next → Season 4

The third season of the reality television series Black Ink Crew aired on VH1 from January 26, 2015 until October 19, 2015. It chronicles the daily operations and staff drama at an African American-owned and operated tattoo shop in Harlem, New York.

== Cast ==
=== Main ===
- Ceaser Emanuel
- Dutchess Lattimore
- O'Shit Duncan
- Puma Robinson
- Sassy Bermudez
- Sky Day

=== Recurring ===
- Ted Ruks
- Walt Miller
- Quani Robinson
- Kathie Arseno
- Donna Lombardi
- Anya

== Episodes ==
| No. overall | No. in season | Title | Original release date | US viewers (millions) |
|---|---|---|---|---|
| 32 | 1 | "Premiere" | January 26, 2015 | 2.12 |
Since Dutchess is doing her own thing, Ceaser focuses on the shop; Puma's world begins to unravel when Quani admits she is unhappy.
| 33 | 2 | "Extra Baggage" | February 2, 2015 | 1.98 |
Dutchess meets Quani for dinner, and invites her to Paris; Sassy invites herself to Paris with the women; Ceaser and the gang celebrates renovations.
| 34 | 3 | "Paris, Bitches!" | February 9, 2015 | 1.94 |
Ceaser has second thoughts about his former flame; Sky tries to teach Ceaser a lesson in love; O'S.**t and Anya head to the hospital.
| 35 | 4 | "C'est La Vie" | February 16, 2015 | 1.87 |
Ceaser surprises Dutchess in Paris; Walt, Ted and O'S**t hold down the fort; Puma comes to check out the new shop; Sky confronts her mother.
| 36 | 5 | "Ain't No Thing But a Chicken Wing" | February 23, 2015 | 1.77 |
Ceaser throws a grand reopening party; Puma makes fun of the remodel; when Puma drops a chicken wing, the truce between him and Ceaser ends.
| 37 | 6 | "Rikers or Rehab?" | March 2, 2015 | 1.96 |
Ceasar reveals news about Puma and Ink 124; O'S**t is given options when he fails a drug test; Puma shows up at Quani's job.
| 38 | 7 | "No Leg to Stand On" | March 9, 2015 | 1.94 |
Ceaser and Dutchess finally show up at the shop; Walt reunites with family; Donna and Anya meet up to talk.
| 39 | 8 | "Movin' Funny" | March 16, 2015 | 1.94 |
Anya recovers in the hospital; O'S**t sends Donna packing; Sassy introduces her new girlfriend; Ceaser, Dutchess and Ted travel to Arizona.
| 40 | 9 | "Sky is the New Black" | March 23, 2015 | 1.93 |
Ted's true feelings about Sky are revealed; Donna deals with the fallout from her run-in with Anya; O'S... fights for sobriety.
| 41 | 10 | "Now It's Turned All the Way Up" | March 30, 2015 | 1.82 |
Ceaser and Big Joe show up at Puma's when he skips the photo shoot; O'S... learns the outcome of his gun charge; Quani shows up at Black Ink.
| 42 | 11 | "This Is Not a Talk Show" | April 6, 2015 | 1.86 |
Dutchess' parents arrive for the engagement party, putting pressure on Ceaser; Quani and Puma make it clear the rivalry still stands.
| 43 | 12 | "All You Did Was Mess Up My Hair" | April 13, 2015 | 1.95 |
Ted surprises Sky; Kathie has the DNA test results for O'S...; Puma formulates a plan to protect his family.
| 44 | 13 | "Searching for a Friend" | August 24, 2015 | 2.23 |
Sky celebrates her freedom; Ceaser makes it clear that Puma is not allowed on his turf; Ted's loyalty is tested; Sassy must confront Puma.
| 45 | 14 | "Water Slides & Shade" | August 31, 2015 | 2.39 |
After she speaks her mind, Ceaser sends Donna packing; Sky learns that Ted has been screwing around; Puma meets with a partner.
| 46 | 15 | "This Ain't No Call Time" | September 7, 2015 | 1.94 |
Ceaser is called to meet with Med; Sky consults with her doctor about an upcoming surgery, revealing news about her past.
| 47 | 16 | "Your Dream, My Nightmare" | September 14, 2015 | 1.93 |
Ceaser searches for a house in North Carolina; Sky tells Puma to "man up"; Donna's new man confronts O'S**t.
| 48 | 17 | "We Want Pre-Nup" | September 21, 2015 | 2.05 |
Ceaser questions the person he is becoming; Sky figures out a way to find closure; Dutchess is shocked by Ceaser's request for a pre-nup.
| 49 | 18 | "Sky Code" | September 28, 2015 | 2.17 |
Dutchess and Ceaser discuss the ownership of Black Ink; Quani visits Tamia; distance is hurting Puma's family; O'S**t brings a friend in for a tattoo.
| 50 | 19 | "Let Us Pray" | October 5, 2015 | 2.18 |
Donna is given a shot at tattooing; Ceaser and Dutchess visit a spiritual advisor; O'S**t's new fling comes in with news.
| 51 | 20 | "Ain't No Party Like a Black Ink Party" | October 12, 2015 | 2.07 |
Kathie loses it when a video is played at a party; Puma reveals big news to Quani; Dutchess gets her shop running; Ceaser makes a decision.
| 52 | 21 | "Behind the Ink" | October 19, 2015 | 2.53 |
Reuniting the cast to relive three seasons of drama; Donna comes clean about the men of Black Ink; Ceaser and Dutchess' relationship is put to the test.
