= Black Ink Crew season 1 =

Black Ink Crew
- Season 1
- Cover used by the iTunes Store
- Starring: Ceaser Emanuel; Dutchess Lattimore; O'S2hit Duncan; Puma Robinson; Sassy Bermudez; Alex Estevez
- No. of episodes: 13

Release
- Original network: VH1
- Original release: January 7 – March 13, 2013

Season chronology
- Next → Season 2

The first season of the reality television series Black Ink Crew aired on VH1 from January 7, 2013 until March 13, 2013. It chronicles the daily operations and staff drama at Ceasars tattoo shop in Harlem, New York.

== Cast ==
=== Main ===
- Ceaser Emanuel
- Dutchess Lattimore
- O'Shit Duncan
- Puma Robinson
- Sassy Bermudez
- Alex Estevez

=== Recurring ===
- Ted Ruks
- Walt Miller
- Quani Robinson
- Kathie Arseno

== Episodes ==
No. overall	No. in season	Title	Original release date	US viewers (millions)
1	1	"Welcome to Harlem, U.S.A."	January 7, 2013	1.78
On the corner of 113th and Lennox, in the heart of Harlem, you'll find the Black Ink Crew and all of their crazy antics.
2	2	"Oh S**t!"	January 14, 2013	1.80
Ceaser is fed up with O’S**t’s unprofessionalism and makes a decision that will send the Black Ink Crew spinning out of control. Puma receives shocking news while at a strip club and is forced to consider tough changes ahead.
3	3	"You Got Served, Son!"	January 21, 2013	1.33
Sassy mulls over leaving the shop; Puma makes discoveries about O'S**t's life; and Alex's feelings for Ted lead to a loss of friendship.
4	4	"Baby Mama Drama"	January 28, 2013	1.60
Dutchess drives Ceaser to court, and he may end up serving time; Sassy takes Puma to get a new tooth.
5	5	"Mixxxy Madness"	February 4, 2013	1.83
Black Ink throws a birthday party for Sassy that turns into an out of control Mixxxy bash and all hell breaks loose. Dutchess goes ballistic after Alex hits on Ceaser.
6	6	"What Happens in Vegas..."	February 11, 2013	1.28
The Black Ink Crew is heading to Vegas to be part of the biggest tattoo convention in the world. Alex has gone M.I.A. and the crew wonders if she is going to show up at all.
7	7	"This, That, and the Third"	February 18, 2013	1.69
O'S**t. is in charge of the shop; when Alex returns, Dutchess has things to say to her.
8	8	"In the Dirty, Dirty"	February 25, 2013	1.75
Down in North Carolina, Ceaser meets Dutchess's entire family and faces questions about marriage and kids. While there, Cease gets a call from Harlem and is surprised to hear that O'S**t's reign has come to an abrupt end.
9	9	"So Much on My Biscuit"	March 4, 2013	1.54
Ceaser and Dutchess cut their trip short to pick up O’S**t from “The Barge,” the New York City prison he has been locked up in for days. Alex and O'S**t face each other for the first time since the night he went to jail.
10	10	"Krazy With a K"	March 11, 2013	1.55
When the Black Ink Crew decide to host a charity art show for local kids, Puma and Dutchess bump heads while planning the event. Ceaser sides with Dutchess, leaving the guys in the shop to question his loyalty and business sense.
11	11	"Judgment Day"	March 18, 2013	1.38
Dutchess reveals a secret to Ceaser; Puma surprises Sassy with big news; Ted drops a bomb on Ceaser.
12	12	"Dropping the "M" Bomb"	March 25, 2013	1.50
Dutchess makes a peace offering at the shop; Alex confides in her old tattoo artist about her frustrations with the crew.
13	13	"Family First"	March 25, 2013	1.48
Ceaser's mentor visits to get a memorial tattoo and reveals her opinions about his relationship with Dutchess; Alex and Dutchess meet.
