= Black Ink Crew season 8 =

Black Ink Crew
- Season 8
- Cover used by the iTunes Store
- Starring: Ceaser Emanuel; Puma Robinson; Sky Days; Donna Lombardi; Ted Ruks; Walt Miller; Young Bae; Miss Kitty
- No. of episodes: 22

Release
- Original network: VH1
- Original release: August 14, 2019 – April 29, 2020

Season chronology
- ← Previous; Season 7 Next → Season 9

The eighth season of the reality television series Black Ink Crew aired on VH1 from August 14, 2019, until April 29, 2020. It chronicles the daily operations and staff drama at an African American-owned and operated tattoo shop in Harlem, New York.

== Cast ==
=== Main ===
- Ceaser Emanuel
- Puma Robinson
- Sky Days
- Donna Lombardi
- Ted Ruks
- Walt Miller
- Young Bae
- Miss Kitty

=== Recurring ===
- Quani Robinson
- Alex "The Vagina Slayer"
- Tatiana
- Krystal
- Q
- Mike
- London

=== Guest ===
- Mama Bae
- Emani
- O'S**t Duncan
- Nikki Duncan
- Jemz
- Naeem Shareef
- Phor Brumfield

== Episodes ==
No. overall	No. in season	Title	Original release date	US viewers (millions)
127	1	"Cease Is 50"	August 14, 2019	1.17
Cease makes Puma a partner at 113th only to have his decision be questioned during his 40th birthday celebration. Bae struggles to keep her marriage together. Sky confronts her son Des.
128	2	"De-wigged"	August 21, 2019	1.15
Walt brings his new girlfriend by the shop, which causes Donna to catch a flashback. Young Bae and Rob face difficulties in their marriage. Sky is at a crossroads with her relationship with Des.
129	3	"Tinkerbell Just Escaped Jail"	August 28, 2019	1.00
Kit's mom passes away in D.C. and the news rocks the shop. Donna and Walt duke it out over Jessica. Puma hires new girl London and Bae thinks Puma's motives are shady.
130	4	"Don't Mess with Taxes"	September 4, 2019	0.98
Puma hires London to cover for Kitty, which disrupts the precarious balance in the shop. Tati has a run-in with the law. Donna faces a major financial setback. Puma tries to bring a little peace to 113th but no good deed goes unpunished.
131	5	"Chop Suey Out the Booty"	September 11, 2019	0.88
In an effort to support Miss Kitty, Ceaser and the crew head down to Memphis, Tenn., so she can reconnect with her mother's roots. Krystal confronts Donna about her behavior during the lock-in.
132	6	"Black Ink Blues"	September 18, 2019	1.01
The crew continues their stay in Memphis to pay their respects to Kitty's mom. London decides to throw a house party to promote the brand Down South. Walt wants take his relationship with Jessica to the next step. Mike receives some unexpected news.
133	7	"Moneymakers, Bootyshakers and Dealbreakers"	September 25, 2019	0.96
Ceaser has a new opportunity to expand Black Ink but not everyone is happy with the deal, leaving him to question where loyalties lie. Donna plans a girls' night that's full of rowdy surprises. Walt and Jess can't see eye to eye.
134	8	"Peanut Butter in Your Timbs"	October 2, 2019	1.00
An unexpected drug test has Tati freaking out. Sky announces a huge surprise. Quani makes a decision that shocks Puma. Rok airs out his dirty laundry. Ceaser has a dangerous run-in with the police.
135	9	"Big Daddy Got Back"	October 9, 2019	1.08
Ceaser deals with the fallout of his arrest. Alex and Donna try to get their magic back in the bedroom. Bae confronts a shocking diagnosis. Sky embarks on a new venture.
136	10	"Nice Day for a Shotgun Wedding"	October 16, 2019	0.99
Donna brings up people in Brooklyn talking trash about the upcoming Black Ink, which sets Ceaser off on a spiral through the past. Walt tries to make amends with Jessica. Sky embarks on a new business adventure.
137	11	"No Sleep Till Brooklyn"	October 23, 2019	0.68
The crew prepares for the grand opening of the Brooklyn shop. Ted comes clean to Ceaser and Puma about why he's been so absent. Mike finally receives his long-awaited paternity test.
138	12	"Jaw Dropped"	October 30, 2019	0.74
The Brooklyn shop is finally open and Ceaser throws a block party to celebrate the grand opening. After Donna gives Alex an ultimatum, things don't go as expected. Crystal has a new jaw and a new attitude.
139	13	"Basic and Predictable"	November 6, 2019	0.69
Rumors swirl about the altercation between Crystal and Miss Kitty. Sky struggles with the future of her Miami shop. News that Tati is dating a new man causes issues for Ted. O'S**t returns and Puma attempts to broker peace between him and Ceasar.
140	14	"Fake Slim Shady"	November 13, 2019	0.75
The crew goes to Cleveland for Walt's first show on his comedy tour and to see Donna's hometown. Alex meets Donna's family for the first time and things don't go smoothly.
141	15	"Lawyer Up!"	November 20, 2019	0.77
Walt begins his first comedy tour in Cleveland. Kitty threatens Ceaser with the law. Alex tries to get the approval of Donna's dad.
142	16	"Black Ink Prom"	November 27, 2019	0.72
An upcoming Black Ink Prom brings out fierce competition for King and Queen. Q helps Crystal get back with Ceasar. One of Donna's tattoo client sends a disturbing letter to the shop.
143	17	"The Problem With Torture Is Everybody Confesses"	February 26, 2020	0.75
The crew is still reeling from the disastrous prom when Ceaser's most prized possession turns up missing. He launches an investigation into the potential thief which leads to some surprising decisions. Sky's son Des tries to track down his mom.
144	18	"You're Not Being Nice, Apparent-Nice"	March 4, 2020	0.71
The news of Sky's suspension rocks the crew while Donna can't accept her apprentice demotion. Ceaser gets political and organizes a voter drive while Q faces a reckoning when his mom visits. Ceaser declares war on Ryan from 9MAG.
145	19	"Dogs Are More Loyal Than Kits"	March 11, 2020	0.70
Ceaser fumes over the video with Ryan and Kitty and plots revenge. Donna attempts to get her job back. Bae gets set up by a matchmaker and finds an unlikely bond with Rok. Walt and Jess' engagement party goes wheels off.
146	20	"Mr. Robinson If You’re Nasty"	March 18, 2020	0.72
After a disastrous engagement party, Walt and Jess attend premarital counseling while the rest of the crew encourage Bae to face her biggest fear - confronting her abusive father.
147	21	"My Name is Earl"	March 25, 2020	0.87
Ceaser and the 113th crew travel to Philly for a tattoo convention and run into some frenemies. Jess has second thoughts about the wedding and Bae meets with her father one last time.
148	22	"Mighty Ceaser Betrayed"	April 1, 2020	0.77
Ceaser fires his shot at Ryan and the two confront each other in a showdown. Relationship issues continue to worry Donna and Alex. Walt has his own tale of woe. Ceaser receives some news that could threaten the very existence of Black Ink New York.
149	23	"Black Ink Matters"	April 8, 2020	0.81
Ceaser and the crew are still reeling from the news that the landlord wants them out of 113th in 30 days. Ceaser decides to do everything in his power to save the shop. Meanwhile, Donna has an uncomfortable chat with Tati, and Walt hits rock bottom.
150	24	"Niko's Going to Have a Cousin?"	April 15, 2020	0.75
Walt and Jess decide on a destination wedding but when nobody responds to their invite they reach out to other friends from their past. Ceaser continues to deal with the prospect of losing 113th and the crew discovers Ted might have a wife.
151	25	"Ka Mate"	April 22, 2020	0.78
Walt and Jess have a destination wedding in Hawaii. The 113th crew surprise the couple on the island but Ceaser gets the biggest surprise of all. Alex plans a big surprise of his own for Donna but Tati's secrets threaten to blow up everything.
152	26	"It's Like Rain on Your Wedding Day"	April 29, 2020	0.98
On the season finale, the crew attempts to keep it together for another day in paradise while Cease refuses a surprise reuniting with loathed O'S**t. Kit defies pressure from Donna and Tati to leave the island. Alex finally pops the question to Donna.
