= Black Ink Crew season 7 =

Black Ink Crew
- Season 7
- Cover used by the iTunes Store
- Starring: Ceaser Emanuel; Sky Days; Donna Lombardi; Ted Ruks; Melody Mitchell; Walt Miller; Young Bae

Release
- Original network: VH1
- Original release: September 19, 2018 – May 1, 2019

Season chronology
- ← Previous; Season 6 Next → Season 8

The seventh season of the reality television series Black Ink Crew premiered on VH1 from September 19, 2018 until May 1, 2019. It chronicles the daily operations and staff drama at an African American-owned and operated tattoo shop in Harlem, New York.

== Cast ==
=== Main ===
- Ceaser Emanuel
- Sky Day
- Donna Lombardi
- Ted Ruks
- Melody Mitchell (episodes 1–14)
- Walt Miller
- Young Bae

=== Recurring ===
- Miss Kitty
- Jadah Blue
- Alex "The Vagina Slayer"
- Tatiana
- Tokie Renet
- Des
- Genesis
- O'S**t Duncan
- Mama Bae
- Krystal
- Puma Robinson
- Charmaine Walker

== Guest ==
- Desiigner
- Ace
- Herb
- Rob — Bae's fiance.
- Nikki Duncan — O'S**t's wife
- Kevin Laroy
- Dutchess Lattimore — Ceaser's ex

== Episodes ==
| No. overall | No. in season | Title | Original release date | US viewers (millions) |
|---|---|---|---|---|
| 105 | 1 | "Ain't No Block Party Like A Harlem Block Party" | September 19, 2018 | 1.31 |
Ceaser expands his Black Ink empire by opening up a shop in New Orleans. Rapper Desiigner stops by for a tattoo. Bae goes into premature labor. Ceaser loses it when the crew decides to party in the Big Easy instead of helping to set up the shop.
| 106 | 2 | "The Joke Of New Orleans" | September 19, 2018 | 1.14 |
Donna catches Alex in a compromising position. Sky's son drops shocking news. Melody's estranged family leaves her heartbroken. Heads roll after a disastrous opening night party.
| 107 | 3 | "Rummy in Your Tummy" | September 26, 2018 | 1.11 |
Tensions blow up when Jadah arrives at the house in New Orleans. Walt confronts Ceaser about calling him a drunk. Black Ink NOLA's grand opening party goes south when Sky lunges at the bartender and the cops are called.
| 108 | 4 | "Three Losers With Diced Tomatoes" | October 3, 2018 | 1.00 |
Ceaser loses it when he discovers the New Orleans shop is completely trashed just before opening day. Donna seeks revenge on Ted for Jadah's firing. A pool party turns into a full out brawl.
| 109 | 5 | "Hotdog Water and Abandoned Buildings" | October 10, 2018 | 1.09 |
Ceaser fumes after learning that an employee was a mole. Bae lets Ceaser's enemies take over the 113th shop. Alex's father faces major surgery. Ceaser comes face to face with former best friend turned rival.
| 110 | 6 | "My Favorite Smurf" | October 17, 2018 | 0.92 |
To get back in Ceaser's good graces, Bae hires a new receptionist. Cheyenne calls Ceaser out for being an absentee parent. Jadah attacks her replacement. Alex blows up when he hears that Donna reconnected with her ex.
| 111 | 7 | "The Power of the Headband" | October 24, 2018 | 1.04 |
The crew heads to New Jersey for a weekend of team-building exercises. Jadah breaks down after a traumatic event. Bae invites her mom to stay with them, causing Rob to freak out. Tokie spirals after receiving a phone call.
| 112 | 8 | "Two Grapes on Pool Tables" | October 31, 2018 | 0.99 |
Sky finds out some big news about her son Des. Tokie tries to work through issues from her past. Donna gives Ceaser an ultimatum. Rob struggles to deal with Bae's mom living in their home. An unexpected guest pops up.
| 113 | 9 | "Signature Not Required" | November 7, 2018 | 1.06 |
Sky grows concerned after Des drops a bomb about his life in Texas. Melody and Lalo's relationship is on the rocks. Donna attempts to apologize to Ceaser and Kitty gets fired up when a woman comes for her job.
| 114 | 10 | "Your Dog's Sister" | November 14, 2018 | 0.91 |
Ceaser freaks out when Sky tells him she wants to open a shop in Miami. Jadah gets revenge on Ted after finding out that he's officially dating Tati. Lalo breaks up with Melody.
| 115 | 11 | "Always Kill Donna!" | November 28, 2018 | 1.00 |
Ceaser makes a bold move when he finds out that Sky betrayed him. Donna and her twin sister feud over Alex; Melody makes a shocking announcement. Bae's mother puts pressure on Bae to get married before she leaves in two weeks.
| 116 | 12 | "Sky Priority" | December 5, 2018 | 1.04 |
After Ceaser shockingly fires Sky, the shop descends into chaos. Bae and Rob receive devastating news. Sky plots her revenge on Ceaser. Ted is furious when Tati gets wasted at a Black Ink party and goes home with another guy.
| 117 | 13 | "My Big Fat Black Ink Wedding" | December 12, 2018 | 1.09 |
The crew heads to Westchester for Bae's wedding weekend. Tati attempts to make amends with Ted. Sky opens her boutique in Miami. Bae's rehearsal dinner turns into chaos when Donna and Alex show up.
| 118 | 14 | "The Black Ink Survivor's Club" | December 19, 2018 | 1.14 |
Bae's wedding is in flux after a family emergency. Ceaser melts down over his father-of-the-bride duties. Ted and Tati take a big step in their relationship. Sky's unexpected arrival throws the wedding into chaos.
| 119 | 15 | "While On Duty, You Can Get Booty" | March 13, 2019 | 0.85 |
Sky is confronted by a dangerous man from her past. Alex is rushed to the emergency room; Ceaser chaperones his daughter's date. Everyone panics when an unknown assailant commits a shocking act of violence against the shop.
| 120 | 16 | "I Love Shopping! I Love America!" | March 20, 2019 | 1.01 |
The crew is concerned about their safety after an act of violence is perpetrated against the shop. Sky comes to the rescue when Bae discovers the extent of her mother's credit card debt. Tati confronts Ted about his behavior.
| 121 | 17 | "Ocean's 113" | March 27, 2019 | 0.97 |
The crew heads to the casino to raise money for Walt. Donna and Alex set out to destroy Ceaser. Tati flips when she discovers shocking news about Ted. Paramedics rush to the scene to aid an unresponsive Ceaser.
| 122 | 18 | "Always Bet on Black Ink" | April 3, 2019 | 1.03 |
Donna joins forces with Ceaser's biggest enemy. the crew risks it all at the casino to help Walt. Sky's son Des meets his biological father for the first time. Ceaser is in for a surprise.
| 123 | 19 | "Peace Out America!" | April 10, 2019 | 0.96 |
The crew throws a going-away party for Mama Bae. Alex snaps at Donna. Ceaser receives devastating news. Bae attacks Kitty for talking behind her back.
| 124 | 20 | "Purification Vacation" | April 17, 2019 | 0.84 |
The crew heads to sunny LA to help Sky with her groundbreaking twerk fashion show -- and for spiritual cleansing. Kitty attempts to make things right with Bae. Tati faces the wrath of everyone.
| 125 | 21 | "Runner Up for Mother Teresa 2" | April 24, 2019 | 0.85 |
Sky hosts her twerk fashion show in Los Angeles. Ceaser comes face to face with Puma, his biggest enemy. Krystal confronts her estranged father. Donna taunts Ceaser from the fashion show stage.
| 126 | 22 | "Free Coats" | May 1, 2019 | 0.94 |
Ceaser and Alex face off. Tati apologizes to the crew, but Tokie refuses to play nice. Sky tries to get Ceaser to face the demons from his past.
