= Black Ink Crew season 4 =

Season of American reality television series

Black Ink Crew
- Season 4
- Starring: Ceaser Emanuel; Dutchess Lattimore; O'Shit Duncan; Puma Robinson; Sky Days; Ted Ruks; Donna Lombardi
- No. of episodes: 12

Release
- Original network: VH1
- Original release: April 4 – June 27, 2016

Season chronology
- ← Previous; Season 3 Next → Season 5

The fourth season of the reality television series Black Ink Crew aired on VH1 from April 4, 2016 until June 27, 2016. It chronicles the daily operations and staff drama at an African American–owned and operated tattoo shop in Harlem, New York.

== Cast ==
=== Main ===
- Ceaser Emanuel
- Dutchess Lattimore
- O'Shit Duncan
- Puma Robinson
- Sky Day
- Donna Lombardi
- Ted Ruks

=== Recurring ===
- Walt Miller
- Quani Robinson
- Kathie Arseno
- Sassy Bermudez
- Melody Mitchell
- Naeem Sharif
- Young Phoenix

== Episodes ==
No. overall	No. in season	Title	Original release date	US viewers (millions)
53	1	"Black Ink for Life!"	April 4, 2016	2.22
After being closed for a month, Ceaser returns to Harlem; Dutchess has to pay for unexpected renovations before her shop can open; Kathie is concerned about child support payments. Sassy is demoted to recurring cast member. Ted and Donna are promoted to main cast members
54	2	"Green Eyes, Moist Lips"	April 11, 2016	2.20
Ceaser's arrest shocks the crew; Puma plans to open a new tattoo shop; Ted hires a new artist behind Ceaser's back.
55	3	"Sixty Bad, Forty Good"	April 18, 2016	2.42
A new artist is given the traditional welcome; the women travel to Miami Beach for Sky's surgery; a night at a club threatens Ceaser and Dutchess' relationship.
56	4	"The Dutchess and the Frog"	April 25, 2016	2.25
Sky undergoes surgery to obtain the body she has always wanted; Ceaser declares war when Puma opens a rival shop; Donna confesses to Dutchess.
57	5	"Orange Is the New Black Ink"	May 2, 2016	2.29
Donna's allegations about Dutchess create drama; Naeem introduces his girlfriend to the crew; Walt struggles with his full-time-father responsibilities.
58	6	"Shots Fired"	May 9, 2016	2.20
Ceaser has a confrontation about Dutchess; Donna refuses to pay Sky her portion of a bill; bullets are fired into Art2Ink.
59	7	"The Butt Party"	May 16, 2016	2.06
Sky hosts a reveal party at the shop; Ceaser stages a mediation to broker peace; Puma's mother-in-law goes on the warpath after the shooting.
60	8	"The Tao of Kathie"	May 23, 2016	2.17
Kathie hopes her spirit guides will help her get revenge; Dutchess spends her last days in New York trying to make amends with Donna; Sky's past rears its ugly head as she begins a new chapter in her life.
61	9	"The Dutchess of Charlotte"	May 30, 2016	1.63
Dutchess has a difficult decision to make when things fall through; after learning her equipment has been thrown out, Donna shows up to confront Dutchess and Ceaser.
62	10	"The Facts About Max"	June 6, 2016	2.08
Ceaser's mother, believing that Dutchess manipulates him, tries to cause problems in their marriage; Sky tests her new body; Donna confronts Max's ex.
63	11	"Inside Hands"	June 20, 2016	2.12
Sky must make a life-altering decision; Puma's Art2Ink sip-and-paint party turns ugly; Ceaser reaches his breaking point.
64	12	"Southbound and Uptown"	June 27, 2016	0.99
The crew heads north for some snow-tubing fun; a doctor gives a grim warning; Donna must make a decision about Max; Ceaser celebrates the new shop. This episode marked the final appearances of Quani, Kathie, Naeem, and Young Phoenix, as well as the final appearances of Puma until Season 7, and Sassy until Season 8
