= Black Ink Crew season 5 =

Black Ink Crew
- Season 5
- Cover used by the iTunes Store
- Starring: Ceaser Emanuel; Dutchess Lattimore; O'Shit Duncan; Sky Days; Ted Ruks; Donna Lombardi
- No. of episodes: 19

Release
- Original network: VH1
- Original release: January 18 – May 3, 2017

Season chronology
- ← Previous; Season 4 Next → Season 6

The fifth season of the reality television series Black Ink Crew aired on VH1 from January 18, 2017, until May 3, 2017. It chronicles the daily operations and staff drama at an African American-owned and operated tattoo shop in Harlem, New York.

== Cast ==
=== Main ===
- Ceaser Emanuel
- Dutchess Lattimore
- O'Shit Duncan
- Sky Day
- Donna Lombardi
- Ted Ruks

=== Recurring ===
- Walt Miller
- Melody Mitchell
- Miss Kitty
- Young Bae
- Tiffany Perez
- Nikki Ducan
- Kevin Laroy

== Episodes ==
No. overall	No. in season	Title	Original release date	US viewers (millions)
65	1	"Hail Ceaser!"	January 18, 2017	1.33
Ceaser has a grand opening party at his new shop; Teddy becomes the executive manager; Donna learns that Max is still involved with his ex.
66	2	"Teddy's Playhouse"	January 18, 2017	1.39
O'S..t returns with a new name; Ted turns Ceaser's old office into a "boom boom room"; Kitty incites a brawl.
67	3	"Bianca"	January 25, 2017	1.03
After learning Kitty was jumped, Ceaser confronts his employees; Young Bae goes into attack mode over a rumor; Nikki agrees to let Richard work; Sky plots to get Donna back.
68	4	"Welcome to Hell"	February 1, 2017	1.24
Dutchess plans a 24-hour tattoo-a-thon, but a fight between Sky and Tiffany causes trouble; Nikki races to the Bronx courthouse; Donna sells an asset.
69	5	"Serving Wedding Realness"	February 8, 2017	1.26
Sky ends up with stitches; Melody wants to return to Black Ink; Sky shares a secret with Ceaser; Richard and Nikki's wedding celebration turns ugly.
70	6	"Dushi or Don't She"	February 15, 2017	1.34
Walt urges Richard to take care of his legal situation; Donna wants her job back; Dutchess returns to New York to celebrate her magazine cover.
71	7	"The Ring Didn't Mean a Thing"	February 22, 2017	1.18
Ceaser is shocked when Dutchess leaves him; Sky asks her female co-workers for a very personal favor; Walt and Sky introduce Young Bae to online dating; Sky fears for her safety when a man from her past shows up at the shop.
72	8	"Ride The Sky Train"	February 28, 2017	1.28
The crew takes Ceaser to Miami for some sun, sand and senoritas; Richard battles it out in court with Kathie over custody of their son; Dutchess receives a disturbing phone call that has her questioning her decision to leave NYC.
73	9	"The Wilds of New Jersey"	March 8, 2017	1.18
The crew goes on a camping trip for some team-building exercises, but all hell breaks loose when an unexpected guest shows up; Dutchess wants proof of Ceaser's affair; Sky and Donna uncover dark secrets from Nikki's past.
74	10	"Puppies Are Magic"	March 8, 2017	1.31
The crew tries to convince Ceaser to reopen the shop; Dutchess finds something on Ceaser's computer; Sky attacks Teddy about his behavior.
75	11	"Buenos Dias Puerto Rico!"	March 15, 2017	1.47
The crew travels to Puerto Rico, but Teddy's mistake threatens to derail the trip; Melody loses her cool over Lalo's refusal to commit; Ceaser and Dutchess come face-to-face.
76	12	"Miss Kitty, P.I."	March 22, 2017	1.36
The crew parties on a boat off the coast of Puerto Rico; Ceaser exposes the truth about Nikki's past; Melody and Lalo commit; Dutchess makes a plea.
77	13	"The Grand Re-Opening"	March 29, 2017	1.20
The crew celebrates the grand reopening of Black Ink; Ted is defensive when Melody makes a power play; shocking information about Nikki; Melody catches Ceaser in a compromising position.
78	14	"He Signs Your Checks..."	April 5, 2017	1.26
Ceaser and the crew attend DMX's birthday party; Sky wants to prevent Kitty from becoming Ceaser's new woman; someone from Nikki's past shows up; a fancy dinner ends in a trashed table.
79	15	"Foodie With the Booty"	April 12, 2017	1.21
Miss Kitty confronts Ceaser about sleeping with Allison; Richard rushes to the hospital; Dutchess gets her groove back.
80	16	"Ruff Times"	April 19, 2017	1.25
Sky shares big news; Ceaser attempts damage control with Miss Kitty; Sky pitches her new workout; Donna believes Sky does not deserve her promotion.
81	17	"Say it, Don’t Spray It"	April 26, 2017	1.37
Ceaser learns something shocking about his relationship with Dutchess; after the loss of their baby, Richard's wife, Nikki, hits her breaking point; Kitty attempts to make peace with Dutchess; Bae is caught up in a new romance.
82	18	"Black Ink Crew: Atlanta"	May 3, 2017	1.15
Miss Kitty refuses to back down from Dutchess; Ceaser wants to cozy up to Karlie Redd; Richard must make a decision about his marriage; Ceaser celebrates the newest shop in his franchise.
83	19	"Behind the Ink"	July 12, 2017	0.59
