= Black Ink Crew season 2 =

Black Ink Crew
- Season 2
- Cover used by the iTunes Store
- Starring: Ceaser Emanuel; Dutchess Lattimore; O'Shit Duncan; Puma Robinson; Sassy Bermudez; Alex Estevez; Sky Days
- No. of episodes: 18

Release
- Original network: VH1
- Original release: September 23, 2013 – April 28, 2014

Season chronology
- ← Previous; Season 1 Next → Season 3

The second season of the reality television series Black Ink Crew aired on VH1 from September 23, 2013 until April 28, 2014. It chronicles the daily operations and staff drama at an African American-owned and operated tattoo shop in Harlem, New York.

== Cast ==
=== Main ===
- Ceaser Emanuel
- Dutchess Lattimore
- O'Shit Duncan
- Puma Robinson
- Sassy Bermudez
- Alex Estevez
- Sky Days (episode 14-18)

=== Recurring ===
- Ted Ruks
- Walt Miller
- Quani Robinson
- Kathie Arseno
- Tiffany Winter

== Episodes ==
No. overall	No. in season	Title	Original release date	US viewers (millions)
14	1	"Premiere"	September 23, 2013	1.60
A court visit brings baby mamas together; Ceaser and Puma's friendship ends.
15	2	"Dutchess Ink"	September 30, 2013	1.60
Dutchess covers a tattoo for recording artist Erica Mena; Ceaser is pressured to get rid of Sassy.
16	3	"No Structure to the Madness"	October 7, 2013	1.63
Ceaser wonders if Dutchess' attitude has gone too far; Ted sits down with Crystal for a heart-to-heart.
17	4	"These Are Minions!"	October 14, 2013	1.89
Ceaser meets with a potential new employee; Puma tells Alex something that could cause fights within the crew.
18	5	"The Year of the Puma"	October 28, 2013	2.29
Ceaser is shocked to learn of Puma's tattoo shop; Puma announces his news at a local Harlem event.
19	6	"You're a Wreck!"	November 4, 2013	2.40
Dutchess does an HIV/AIDS awareness tattoo for Maria Davis; Puma defends Sassy in Central Park.
20	7	"I Did Not Sleep With That Woman!"	November 11, 2013	2.65
Dutchess and Ceaser wonder if their relationship is hindering their success; Ted and Ceaser decide to surprise Puma at his new shop.
21	8	"Something in the Water"	November 18, 2013	2.35
Walt has another child on the way; Ceaser is angry when learns that Dutchess met with an ex-boyfriend.
22	9	"Have Several Seats"	November 25, 2013	2.29
Confused about his future with Dutchess, Ceaser escapes to Puma's Atlantic City, N.J., bachelor party.
23	10	"You Got Some Stupid Ears"	December 2, 2013	2.18
Puma invites Ceaser, but not Dutchess to his wedding; a letter arrives with information about Walt's father.
24	11	"Tell the Truth and Shame the Devil"	December 9, 2013	2.03
Coley and Kathy face each other for the first time since their violent encounter; Ceaser is torn between his friends and his woman; Dutchess reacts negatively to not being invited to Puma's wedding.
25	12	"S**t Happens"	December 16, 2013	2.03
Walt confronts O'S**t about friendship and responsibility; Dutchess flees Ceaser in Jamaica, collapsing in the parking lot.
26	13	"From Wedlock to Headlock"	December 23, 2013	1.53
Kathy loses it when O'S**t reveals his intentions with Anya; Puma confronts his future mother-in-law.
27	14	"Cease and Desist"	March 31, 2014	2.25
Dutchess returns after her heart surgery; Ceaser and Dutchess have their first encounter since the breakup; Puma throws a party for his grand opening. Sky is added to the opening credits replacing Alex.
28	15	"We All Got Problems"	April 7, 2014	1.73
O'S**t learns information about his case; Ceaser and his sister fight during her visit; Dutchess shows up at Walt's baby shower.
29	16	"The Break-Up"	April 14, 2014	1.96
Ceaser shows up at Dutchess' apartment and finds the police there; O'S**t asks Puma to go ring shopping; Dutchess invites Sassy to a girls' night out.
30	17	"Baby Mama Role Call"	April 21, 2014	1.96
Ceaser faces Dutchess; O'S**t brings his three baby-mamas together to meld his growing family.
31	18	"Season 2 Finale"	April 28, 2014	1.96
The crew throws a birthday party for Sky; Dutchess decides on surgery; Ceaser and Puma collaborate. This episode marks the final appearances of Tiffany and Alex.
