= Black Ink Crew season 6 =

Black Ink Crew
- Season 6
- Cover used by the iTunes Store
- Starring: Ceaser Emanuel; Sky Days; Donna Lombardi; Ted Ruks; Melody Mitchell; Walt Miller; Young Bae
- No. of episodes: 21

Release
- Original network: VH1
- Original release: December 6, 2017 – May 9, 2018

Season chronology
- ← Previous; Season 5 Next → Season 7

The sixth season of the reality television series Black Ink Crew premiered on December 6, 2017 until May 9, 2018 on VH1. It chronicles the daily operations and staff drama at an African American-owned and operated tattoo shop in Harlem, New York.

== Cast ==
=== Main ===
- Ceaser Emanuel
- Sky Day
- Donna Lombardi
- Ted Ruks
- Melody Mitchell
- Walt Miller
- Young Bae

=== Recurring ===
- O'S**t Duncan
- Miss Kitty
- Kevin Laroy
- Jadah Blue
- Alex "The Vagina Slayer"
- Tatiana

== Guest ==
- Karlie Redd – Ceaser's ex-lover
- Persuasian – Ceaser's fling, Oxygen’s Bad Girls Club
- Crystal – Ceaser's baby mama
- Lalo – Melody's baby daddy
- Allison – Sky's friend
- Mo – Donna's boyfriend
- Rob – Bae's boyfriend
- Nikki – O'S**t's wife
- Puma Robinson — O'S**t's friend.
- Crystal Marie — Ceaser's best friend.

== Episodes ==
No. overall	No. in season	Title	Original release date	US viewers (millions)
84	1	"Ceaser A.D. (After Dutchess)"	December 6, 2017	1.42
Single, Ceaser seems more interested in chasing women than running his business. Donna receives a threatening phone call. The anniversary party turns into chaos.
85	2	"This Makes My Boricua Come Out, Mami"	December 13, 2017	1.02
Teddy's brother faces life in prison. Sky makes a life-changing phone call. Melody receives a letter from the IRS. A brawl breaks out at Black Ink.
86	3	"Texas Here I Come!"	December 20, 2017	1.23
Ceaser receives alarming news from his doctor. Melody is shocked by Lalo's solution to their financial issues. Sky travels to Texas to reunite with the children she gave up for adoption.
87	4	"A Thief Among Us"	December 27, 2017	1.44
Ceaser asks Sky to find out who stole money from the shop. Rob wants to take the relationship to the next level, but Bae freaks out. Melody has a breakdown.
88	5	"Help Me Howard"	January 3, 2018	1.42
Ceaser puts Sky in charge of 113th. Kevin decides to come out to his homophobic father. Ceaser is forced to break up with his side pieces. Donna's ex-roommate trashes her.
89	6	"Ceaser for Mayor"	January 10, 2018	1.20
Ceaser braces for a fight. Donna seeks revenge on her ex-roommate. Bae worries for her mother's safety after she receives death threats.
90	7	"The Return of O'S**t"	January 17, 2018	1.27
Ceaser bails out Alex in New York City. Walt has a date with Jadah. A new manager-in-training crosses the line. An OG artist returns to the shop.
91	8	"The Lingerie Soiree"	January 24, 2018	1.32
Things get physical when the new manager-in-training criticizes Donna. The crew tries to get Melody to come back to the shop. Sky gets emotional over her tense relationship with her son.
92	9	"Seoul Searching"	January 31, 2018	1.18
The crew heads to Korea to find Bae's missing mom. Sky goes on the attack after hearing a rumor about Ted and Kitty. Bae fears the worst when the search for her mom hits a dead end. The results of a pregnancy test shock Donna.
93	10	"See Ya, Korea"	February 21, 2018	1.10
Bae continues the search for her missing mom in Korea while struggling to deal with her pregnancy. O'Sh*t clashes with Alex over a client. Sky becomes unhinged as she begins to question Bae's past.
94	11	"Kim Jong Sky"	February 28, 2018	1.22
The crew calls Sky out for her behavior in Korea. Nikki drops a bomb on O'S**t. Bae is shocked by Rob's reaction to the news that she's pregnant. Ceaser and Kitty rekindle their romance. Jadah attempts to play matchmaker.
95	12	"The Book of Genesis"	March 7, 2018	1.20
O'S**t rushes to Atlanta for the birth of his fourth child. Sky freaks out when Ceaser contacts her son, Genesis. Bae wants a shotgun wedding, but Rob has other plans. Ceaser has an emotional meeting with Sky's son.
96	13	"Project Kitty Kitty Bang Bang"	March 14, 2018	1.12
Melody meets her father's estranged family for the first time. The rest of the crew heads to the slopes. Ceaser devises grand romantic gestures for Kitty. Sky loses her cool when Teddy hooks up with a fellow Black Ink employee.
97	14	"C and C Forever"	March 21, 2018	1.41
The crew turns up at Bae's bachelorette party. Sky spreads a vicious rumor about Jadah. Donna is in hot water after Alex posts a scandalous video. Sky attempts to repair her fractured relationship with the son she gave up for adoption.
98	15	"Migos and Oprah and Horses and Rainbows"	March 28, 2018	1.02
Donna is rushed to the emergency room. Sky embarks on a spiritual journey. The Fat Jewish stops by the shop for a tattoo chosen by his Instagram followers.
99	16	"Baby Making Factory"	April 4, 2018	0.88
O'S**t tries to bring the mothers of his children together. Sky decides she's ready to have a baby and enlists Ceaser to help. Walt hits rock bottom and sends his children to live with their mother. Jadah goes ballistic.
100	17	"His Dog's Baby Mother"	April 11, 2018	1.00
The crew decides to secretly perform a paternity test on O'S**t's new baby. Ted and Sky go on a date that has a surprising outcome. Donna campaigns to be Bae's doula. Walt works hard to get his kids back home.
101	18	"It's Not a Puma"	April 18, 2018	1.04
Sky pops the question to Eliot. Donna is caught trying to steal Mel's client. O'S**t commits the ultimate betrayal when he seeks a job with Ceaser's biggest enemy. A woman claims Black Ink gave her an infected tattoo.
102	19	"Crouching Tiger, Hidden Donna"	April 25, 2018	1.03
Sky throws a party that has everybody gagging. A video of Donna getting intimate with a coworker goes viral. Walt puts on an exhibition hoping to get his finances on track. Ceaser's apartment is invaded by his daughter.
103	20	"Dirty Donna"	May 2, 2018	1.15
Ceaser and the crew crash Sky's vacation in Miami. Kitty launches an attack on Ceaser. Alex reveals his true feelings to Donna. An unexpected guest shows up seeking revenge.
104	21	"Haitian Twerk Fest"	May 9, 2018	1.12
The crew continues to turn up on South Beach. Alex is rushed to the emergency room after he collapses on the beach. Jadah and Tati come to blows. Ceaser throws a Scarfaced-themed party to impress a girl.
