= List of Black Ink Crew episodes =

Black Ink Crew is an American reality television series that began airing on January 7, 2013, and airs on VH1. It chronicles the daily operations and staff drama at an African American-owned and operated tattoo shop in the Harlem neighborhood of New York City.

== Series overview ==
Season	Episodes		Originally released	
Season	Episodes		First released	Last released
1	13		January 7, 2013	March 25, 2013
2	18		September 23, 2013	April 28, 2014
3	21		January 26, 2015	October 19, 2015
4	12		April 4, 2016	June 27, 2016
5	19		January 18, 2017	July 12, 2017
6	21		December 6, 2017	May 9, 2018
7	22		September 19, 2018	May 1, 2019
8	26		August 14, 2019	April 29, 2020
9	22	10	April 19, 2021	June 21, 2021
9	22	12	February 21, 2022	May 9, 2022
10	22	10	October 18, 2022	December 20, 2022
10	22	12	May 15, 2023	July 31, 2023

== Episodes ==
=== Season 1 (2013) ===
No. overall	No. in season	Title	Original release date	US viewers (millions)
1	1	"Welcome to Harlem, U.S.A."	January 7, 2013	1.78
On the corner of 113th and Lennox, in the heart of Harlem, you'll find the Black Ink Crew and all of their crazy antics.
2	2	"Oh S**t!"	January 14, 2013	1.80
Ceaser is fed up with O’S**t’s unprofessionalism and makes a decision that will send the Black Ink Crew spinning out of control. Puma receives shocking news while at a strip club and is forced to consider tough changes ahead.
3	3	"You Got Served, Son!"	January 21, 2013	1.33
Sassy mulls over leaving the shop; Puma makes discoveries about O'S**t's life; and Alex's feelings for Ted lead to a loss of friendship.
4	4	"Baby Mama Drama"	January 28, 2013	1.60
Dutchess drives Ceaser to court, and he may end up serving time; Sassy takes Puma to get a new tooth.
5	5	"Mixxxy Madness"	February 4, 2013	1.83
Black Ink throws a birthday party for Sassy that turns into an out of control Mixxxy bash and all hell breaks loose. Dutchess goes ballistic after Alex hits on Ceaser.
6	6	"What Happens in Vegas..."	February 11, 2013	1.28
The Black Ink Crew is heading to Vegas to be part of the biggest tattoo convention in the world. Alex has gone M.I.A. and the crew wonders if she is going to show up at all.
7	7	"This, That, and the Third"	February 18, 2013	1.69
O'S**t. is in charge of the shop; when Alex returns, Dutchess has things to say to her.
8	8	"In the Dirty, Dirty"	February 25, 2013	1.75
Down in North Carolina, Ceaser meets Dutchess's entire family and faces questions about marriage and kids. While there, Cease gets a call from Harlem and is surprised to hear that O'S**t's reign has come to an abrupt end.
9	9	"So Much on My Biscuit"	March 4, 2013	1.54
Ceaser and Dutchess cut their trip short to pick up O’S**t from “The Barge,” the New York City prison he has been locked up in for days. Alex and O'S**t face each other for the first time since the night he went to jail.
10	10	"Krazy With a K"	March 11, 2013	1.55
When the Black Ink Crew decide to host a charity art show for local kids, Puma and Dutchess bump heads while planning the event. Ceaser sides with Dutchess, leaving the guys in the shop to question his loyalty and business sense.
11	11	"Judgment Day"	March 18, 2013	1.38
Dutchess reveals a secret to Ceaser; Puma surprises Sassy with big news; Ted drops a bomb on Ceaser.
12	12	"Dropping the "M" Bomb"	March 25, 2013	1.50
Dutchess makes a peace offering at the shop; Alex confides in her old tattoo artist about her frustrations with the crew.
13	13	"Family First"	March 25, 2013	1.48
Ceaser's mentor visits to get a memorial tattoo and reveals her opinions about his relationship with Dutchess; Alex and Dutchess meet.

=== Season 2 (2013–14) ===
No. overall	No. in season	Title	Original release date	US viewers (millions)
14	1	"Premiere"	September 23, 2013	1.60
A court visit brings baby mamas together; Ceaser and Puma's friendship ends.
15	2	"Dutchess Ink"	September 30, 2013	1.60
Dutchess covers a tattoo for recording artist Erica Mena; Ceaser is pressured to get rid of Sassy.
16	3	"No Structure to the Madness"	October 7, 2013	1.63
Ceaser wonders if Dutchess' attitude has gone too far; Ted sits down with Crystal for a heart-to-heart.
17	4	"These Are Minions!"	October 14, 2013	1.89
Ceaser meets with a potential new employee; Puma tells Alex something that could cause fights within the crew.
18	5	"The Year of the Puma"	October 28, 2013	2.29
Ceaser is shocked to learn of Puma's tattoo shop; Puma announces his news at a local Harlem event.
19	6	"You're a Wreck!"	November 4, 2013	2.40
Dutchess does an HIV/AIDS awareness tattoo for Maria Davis; Puma defends Sassy in Central Park.
20	7	"I Did Not Sleep With That Woman!"	November 11, 2013	2.65
Dutchess and Ceaser wonder if their relationship is hindering their success; Ted and Ceaser decide to surprise Puma at his new shop.
21	8	"Something in the Water"	November 18, 2013	2.35
Walt has another child on the way; Ceaser is angry when learns that Dutchess met with an ex-boyfriend.
22	9	"Have Several Seats"	November 25, 2013	2.29
Confused about his future with Dutchess, Ceaser escapes to Puma's Atlantic City, N.J., bachelor party.
23	10	"You Got Some Stupid Ears"	December 2, 2013	2.18
Puma invites Ceaser, but not Dutchess to his wedding; a letter arrives with information about Walt's father.
24	11	"Tell the Truth and Shame the Devil"	December 9, 2013	2.03
Coley and Kathy face each other for the first time since their violent encounter; Ceaser is torn between his friends and his woman; Dutchess reacts negatively to not being invited to Puma's wedding.
25	12	"S**t Happens"	December 16, 2013	2.03
Walt confronts O'S**t about friendship and responsibility; Dutchess flees Ceaser in Jamaica, collapsing in the parking lot.
26	13	"From Wedlock to Headlock"	December 23, 2013	1.53
Kathy loses it when O'S**t reveals his intentions with Anya; Puma confronts his future mother-in-law.
27	14	"Cease and Desist"	March 31, 2014	2.25
Dutchess returns after her heart surgery; Ceaser and Dutchess have their first encounter since the breakup; Puma throws a party for his grand opening. Sky is added to the opening credits replacing Alex.
28	15	"We All Got Problems"	April 7, 2014	1.73
O'S**t learns information about his case; Ceaser and his sister fight during her visit; Dutchess shows up at Walt's baby shower.
29	16	"The Break-Up"	April 14, 2014	1.96
Ceaser shows up at Dutchess' apartment and finds the police there; O'S**t asks Puma to go ring shopping; Dutchess invites Sassy to a girls' night out.
30	17	"Baby Mama Role Call"	April 21, 2014	1.96
Ceaser faces Dutchess; O'S**t brings his three baby-mamas together to meld his growing family.
31	18	"Season 2 Finale"	April 28, 2014	1.96
The crew throws a birthday party for Sky; Dutchess decides on surgery; Ceaser and Puma collaborate. This episode marks the final appearances of Tiffany and Alex.

=== Season 3 (2015) ===
No. overall	No. in season	Title	Original release date	US viewers (millions)
32	1	"Premiere"	January 26, 2015	2.12
Since Dutchess is doing her own thing, Ceaser focuses on the shop; Puma's world begins to unravel when Quani admits she is unhappy.
33	2	"Extra Baggage"	February 2, 2015	1.98
Dutchess meets Quani for dinner, and invites her to Paris; Sassy invites herself to Paris with the women; Ceaser and the gang celebrates renovations.
34	3	"Paris, Bitches!"	February 9, 2015	1.94
Ceaser has second thoughts about his former flame; Sky tries to teach Ceaser a lesson in love; O'S.**t and Anya head to the hospital.
35	4	"C'est La Vie"	February 16, 2015	1.87
Ceaser surprises Dutchess in Paris; Walt, Ted and O'S**t hold down the fort; Puma comes to check out the new shop; Sky confronts her mother.
36	5	"Ain't No Thing But a Chicken Wing"	February 23, 2015	1.77
Ceaser throws a grand reopening party; Puma makes fun of the remodel; when Puma drops a chicken wing, the truce between him and Ceaser ends.
37	6	"Rikers or Rehab?"	March 2, 2015	1.96
Ceasar reveals news about Puma and Ink 124; O'S**t is given options when he fails a drug test; Puma shows up at Quani's job.
38	7	"No Leg to Stand On"	March 9, 2015	1.94
Ceaser and Dutchess finally show up at the shop; Walt reunites with family; Donna and Anya meet up to talk.
39	8	"Movin' Funny"	March 16, 2015	1.94
Anya recovers in the hospital; O'S**t sends Donna packing; Sassy introduces her new girlfriend; Ceaser, Dutchess and Ted travel to Arizona.
40	9	"Sky is the New Black"	March 23, 2015	1.93
Ted's true feelings about Sky are revealed; Donna deals with the fallout from her run-in with Anya; O'S... fights for sobriety.
41	10	"Now It's Turned All the Way Up"	March 30, 2015	1.82
Ceaser and Big Joe show up at Puma's when he skips the photo shoot; O'S... learns the outcome of his gun charge; Quani shows up at Black Ink.
42	11	"This Is Not a Talk Show"	April 6, 2015	1.86
Dutchess' parents arrive for the engagement party, putting pressure on Ceaser; Quani and Puma make it clear the rivalry still stands.
43	12	"All You Did Was Mess Up My Hair"	April 13, 2015	1.95
Ted surprises Sky; Kathie has the DNA test results for O'S...; Puma formulates a plan to protect his family.
44	13	"Searching for a Friend"	August 24, 2015	2.23
Sky celebrates her freedom; Ceaser makes it clear that Puma is not allowed on his turf; Ted's loyalty is tested; Sassy must confront Puma.
45	14	"Water Slides & Shade"	August 31, 2015	2.39
After she speaks her mind, Ceaser sends Donna packing; Sky learns that Ted has been screwing around; Puma meets with a partner.
46	15	"This Ain't No Call Time"	September 7, 2015	1.94
Ceaser is called to meet with Med; Sky consults with her doctor about an upcoming surgery, revealing news about her past.
47	16	"Your Dream, My Nightmare"	September 14, 2015	1.93
Ceaser searches for a house in North Carolina; Sky tells Puma to "man up"; Donna's new man confronts O'S**t.
48	17	"We Want Pre-Nup"	September 21, 2015	2.05
Ceaser questions the person he is becoming; Sky figures out a way to find closure; Dutchess is shocked by Ceaser's request for a pre-nup.
49	18	"Sky Code"	September 28, 2015	2.17
Dutchess and Ceaser discuss the ownership of Black Ink; Quani visits Tamia; distance is hurting Puma's family; O'S**t brings a friend in for a tattoo.
50	19	"Let Us Pray"	October 5, 2015	2.18
Donna is given a shot at tattooing; Ceaser and Dutchess visit a spiritual advisor; O'S**t's new fling comes in with news.
51	20	"Ain't No Party Like a Black Ink Party"	October 12, 2015	2.07
Kathie loses it when a video is played at a party; Puma reveals big news to Quani; Dutchess gets her shop running; Ceaser makes a decision.
52	21	"Behind the Ink"	October 19, 2015	2.53
Reuniting the cast to relive three seasons of drama; Donna comes clean about the men of Black Ink; Ceaser and Dutchess' relationship is put to the test.

=== Season 4 (2016) ===
No. overall	No. in season	Title	Original release date	US viewers (millions)
53	1	"Black Ink for Life!"	April 4, 2016	2.22
After being closed for a month, Ceaser returns to Harlem; Dutchess has to pay for unexpected renovations before her shop can open; Kathie is concerned about child support payments. Sassy is demoted to recurring cast member. Ted and Donna are promoted to main cast members
54	2	"Green Eyes, Moist Lips"	April 11, 2016	2.20
Ceaser's arrest shocks the crew; Puma plans to open a new tattoo shop; Ted hires a new artist behind Ceaser's back.
55	3	"Sixty Bad, Forty Good"	April 18, 2016	2.42
A new artist is given the traditional welcome; the women travel to Miami Beach for Sky's surgery; a night at a club threatens Ceaser and Dutchess' relationship.
56	4	"The Dutchess and the Frog"	April 25, 2016	2.25
Sky undergoes surgery to obtain the body she has always wanted; Ceaser declares war when Puma opens a rival shop; Donna confesses to Dutchess.
57	5	"Orange Is the New Black Ink"	May 2, 2016	2.29
Donna's allegations about Dutchess create drama; Naeem introduces his girlfriend to the crew; Walt struggles with his full-time-father responsibilities.
58	6	"Shots Fired"	May 9, 2016	2.20
Ceaser has a confrontation about Dutchess; Donna refuses to pay Sky her portion of a bill; bullets are fired into Art2Ink.
59	7	"The Butt Party"	May 16, 2016	2.06
Sky hosts a reveal party at the shop; Ceaser stages a mediation to broker peace; Puma's mother-in-law goes on the warpath after the shooting.
60	8	"The Tao of Kathie"	May 23, 2016	2.17
Kathie hopes her spirit guides will help her get revenge; Dutchess spends her last days in New York trying to make amends with Donna; Sky's past rears its ugly head as she begins a new chapter in her life.
61	9	"The Dutchess of Charlotte"	May 30, 2016	1.63
Dutchess has a difficult decision to make when things fall through; after learning her equipment has been thrown out, Donna shows up to confront Dutchess and Ceaser.
62	10	"The Facts About Max"	June 6, 2016	2.08
Ceaser's mother, believing that Dutchess manipulates him, tries to cause problems in their marriage; Sky tests her new body; Donna confronts Max's ex.
63	11	"Inside Hands"	June 20, 2016	2.12
Sky must make a life-altering decision; Puma's Art2Ink sip-and-paint party turns ugly; Ceaser reaches his breaking point.
64	12	"Southbound and Uptown"	June 27, 2016	0.99
The crew heads north for some snow-tubing fun; a doctor gives a grim warning; Donna must make a decision about Max; Ceaser celebrates the new shop. This episode marked the final appearances of Quani, Kathie, Naeem, and Young Phoenix, as well as the final appearances of Puma until Season 7, and Sassy until Season 8

=== Season 5 (2017) ===
No. overall	No. in season	Title	Original release date	US viewers (millions)
65	1	"Hail Ceaser!"	January 18, 2017	1.33
Ceaser has a grand opening party at his new shop; Teddy becomes the executive manager; Donna learns that Max is still involved with his ex.
66	2	"Teddy's Playhouse"	January 18, 2017	1.39
O'S..t returns with a new name; Ted turns Ceaser's old office into a "boom boom room"; Kitty incites a brawl.
67	3	"Bianca"	January 25, 2017	1.03
After learning Kitty was jumped, Ceaser confronts his employees; Young Bae goes into attack mode over a rumor; Nikki agrees to let Richard work; Sky plots to get Donna back.
68	4	"Welcome to Hell"	February 1, 2017	1.24
Dutchess plans a 24-hour tattoo-a-thon, but a fight between Sky and Tiffany causes trouble; Nikki races to the Bronx courthouse; Donna sells an asset.
69	5	"Serving Wedding Realness"	February 8, 2017	1.26
Sky ends up with stitches; Melody wants to return to Black Ink; Sky shares a secret with Ceaser; Richard and Nikki's wedding celebration turns ugly.
70	6	"Dushi or Don't She"	February 15, 2017	1.34
Walt urges Richard to take care of his legal situation; Donna wants her job back; Dutchess returns to New York to celebrate her magazine cover.
71	7	"The Ring Didn't Mean a Thing"	February 22, 2017	1.18
Ceaser is shocked when Dutchess leaves him; Sky asks her female co-workers for a very personal favor; Walt and Sky introduce Young Bae to online dating; Sky fears for her safety when a man from her past shows up at the shop.
72	8	"Ride The Sky Train"	February 28, 2017	1.28
The crew takes Ceaser to Miami for some sun, sand and senoritas; Richard battles it out in court with Kathie over custody of their son; Dutchess receives a disturbing phone call that has her questioning her decision to leave NYC.
73	9	"The Wilds of New Jersey"	March 8, 2017	1.18
The crew goes on a camping trip for some team-building exercises, but all hell breaks loose when an unexpected guest shows up; Dutchess wants proof of Ceaser's affair; Sky and Donna uncover dark secrets from Nikki's past.
74	10	"Puppies Are Magic"	March 8, 2017	1.31
The crew tries to convince Ceaser to reopen the shop; Dutchess finds something on Ceaser's computer; Sky attacks Teddy about his behavior.
75	11	"Buenos Dias Puerto Rico!"	March 15, 2017	1.47
The crew travels to Puerto Rico, but Teddy's mistake threatens to derail the trip; Melody loses her cool over Lalo's refusal to commit; Ceaser and Dutchess come face-to-face.
76	12	"Miss Kitty, P.I."	March 22, 2017	1.36
The crew parties on a boat off the coast of Puerto Rico; Ceaser exposes the truth about Nikki's past; Melody and Lalo commit; Dutchess makes a plea.
77	13	"The Grand Re-Opening"	March 29, 2017	1.20
The crew celebrates the grand reopening of Black Ink; Ted is defensive when Melody makes a power play; shocking information about Nikki; Melody catches Ceaser in a compromising position.
78	14	"He Signs Your Checks..."	April 5, 2017	1.26
Ceaser and the crew attend DMX's birthday party; Sky wants to prevent Kitty from becoming Ceaser's new woman; someone from Nikki's past shows up; a fancy dinner ends in a trashed table.
79	15	"Foodie With the Booty"	April 12, 2017	1.21
Miss Kitty confronts Ceaser about sleeping with Allison; Richard rushes to the hospital; Dutchess gets her groove back.
80	16	"Ruff Times"	April 19, 2017	1.25
Sky shares big news; Ceaser attempts damage control with Miss Kitty; Sky pitches her new workout; Donna believes Sky does not deserve her promotion.
81	17	"Say it, Don’t Spray It"	April 26, 2017	1.37
Ceaser learns something shocking about his relationship with Dutchess; after the loss of their baby, Richard's wife, Nikki, hits her breaking point; Kitty attempts to make peace with Dutchess; Bae is caught up in a new romance.
82	18	"Black Ink Crew: Atlanta"	May 3, 2017	1.15
Miss Kitty refuses to back down from Dutchess; Ceaser wants to cozy up to Karlie Redd; Richard must make a decision about his marriage; Ceaser celebrates the newest shop in his franchise.
83	19	"Behind the Ink"	July 12, 2017	0.59

=== Season 6 (2017–18) ===
No. overall	No. in season	Title	Original release date	US viewers (millions)
84	1	"Ceaser A.D. (After Dutchess)"	December 6, 2017	1.42
Single, Ceaser seems more interested in chasing women than running his business. Donna receives a threatening phone call. The anniversary party turns into chaos.
85	2	"This Makes My Boricua Come Out, Mami"	December 13, 2017	1.02
Teddy's brother faces life in prison. Sky makes a life-changing phone call. Melody receives a letter from the IRS. A brawl breaks out at Black Ink.
86	3	"Texas Here I Come!"	December 20, 2017	1.23
Ceaser receives alarming news from his doctor. Melody is shocked by Lalo's solution to their financial issues. Sky travels to Texas to reunite with the children she gave up for adoption.
87	4	"A Thief Among Us"	December 27, 2017	1.44
Ceaser asks Sky to find out who stole money from the shop. Rob wants to take the relationship to the next level, but Bae freaks out. Melody has a breakdown.
88	5	"Help Me Howard"	January 3, 2018	1.42
Ceaser puts Sky in charge of 113th. Kevin decides to come out to his homophobic father. Ceaser is forced to break up with his side pieces. Donna's ex-roommate trashes her.
89	6	"Ceaser for Mayor"	January 10, 2018	1.20
Ceaser braces for a fight. Donna seeks revenge on her ex-roommate. Bae worries for her mother's safety after she receives death threats.
90	7	"The Return of O'S**t"	January 17, 2018	1.27
Ceaser bails out Alex in New York City. Walt has a date with Jadah. A new manager-in-training crosses the line. An OG artist returns to the shop.
91	8	"The Lingerie Soiree"	January 24, 2018	1.32
Things get physical when the new manager-in-training criticizes Donna. The crew tries to get Melody to come back to the shop. Sky gets emotional over her tense relationship with her son.
92	9	"Seoul Searching"	January 31, 2018	1.18
The crew heads to Korea to find Bae's missing mom. Sky goes on the attack after hearing a rumor about Ted and Kitty. Bae fears the worst when the search for her mom hits a dead end. The results of a pregnancy test shock Donna.
93	10	"See Ya, Korea"	February 21, 2018	1.10
Bae continues the search for her missing mom in Korea while struggling to deal with her pregnancy. O'Sh*t clashes with Alex over a client. Sky becomes unhinged as she begins to question Bae's past.
94	11	"Kim Jong Sky"	February 28, 2018	1.22
The crew calls Sky out for her behavior in Korea. Nikki drops a bomb on O'S**t. Bae is shocked by Rob's reaction to the news that she's pregnant. Ceaser and Kitty rekindle their romance. Jadah attempts to play matchmaker.
95	12	"The Book of Genesis"	March 7, 2018	1.20
O'S**t rushes to Atlanta for the birth of his fourth child. Sky freaks out when Ceaser contacts her son, Genesis. Bae wants a shotgun wedding, but Rob has other plans. Ceaser has an emotional meeting with Sky's son.
96	13	"Project Kitty Kitty Bang Bang"	March 14, 2018	1.12
Melody meets her father's estranged family for the first time. The rest of the crew heads to the slopes. Ceaser devises grand romantic gestures for Kitty. Sky loses her cool when Teddy hooks up with a fellow Black Ink employee.
97	14	"C and C Forever"	March 21, 2018	1.41
The crew turns up at Bae's bachelorette party. Sky spreads a vicious rumor about Jadah. Donna is in hot water after Alex posts a scandalous video. Sky attempts to repair her fractured relationship with the son she gave up for adoption.
98	15	"Migos and Oprah and Horses and Rainbows"	March 28, 2018	1.02
Donna is rushed to the emergency room. Sky embarks on a spiritual journey. The Fat Jewish stops by the shop for a tattoo chosen by his Instagram followers.
99	16	"Baby Making Factory"	April 4, 2018	0.88
O'S**t tries to bring the mothers of his children together. Sky decides she's ready to have a baby and enlists Ceaser to help. Walt hits rock bottom and sends his children to live with their mother. Jadah goes ballistic.
100	17	"His Dog's Baby Mother"	April 11, 2018	1.00
The crew decides to secretly perform a paternity test on O'S**t's new baby. Ted and Sky go on a date that has a surprising outcome. Donna campaigns to be Bae's doula. Walt works hard to get his kids back home.
101	18	"It's Not a Puma"	April 18, 2018	1.04
Sky pops the question to Eliot. Donna is caught trying to steal Mel's client. O'S**t commits the ultimate betrayal when he seeks a job with Ceaser's biggest enemy. A woman claims Black Ink gave her an infected tattoo.
102	19	"Crouching Tiger, Hidden Donna"	April 25, 2018	1.03
Sky throws a party that has everybody gagging. A video of Donna getting intimate with a coworker goes viral. Walt puts on an exhibition hoping to get his finances on track. Ceaser's apartment is invaded by his daughter.
103	20	"Dirty Donna"	May 2, 2018	1.15
Ceaser and the crew crash Sky's vacation in Miami. Kitty launches an attack on Ceaser. Alex reveals his true feelings to Donna. An unexpected guest shows up seeking revenge.
104	21	"Haitian Twerk Fest"	May 9, 2018	1.12
The crew continues to turn up on South Beach. Alex is rushed to the emergency room after he collapses on the beach. Jadah and Tati come to blows. Ceaser throws a Scarfaced-themed party to impress a girl.

=== Season 7 (2018–19) ===
No. overall	No. in season	Title	Original release date	US viewers (millions)
105	1	"Ain't No Block Party Like A Harlem Block Party"	September 19, 2018	1.31
Ceaser expands his Black Ink empire by opening up a shop in New Orleans. Rapper Desiigner stops by for a tattoo. Bae goes into premature labor. Ceaser loses it when the crew decides to party in the Big Easy instead of helping to set up the shop.
106	2	"The Joke Of New Orleans"	September 19, 2018	1.14
Donna catches Alex in a compromising position. Sky's son drops shocking news. Melody's estranged family leaves her heartbroken. Heads roll after a disastrous opening night party.
107	3	"Rummy in Your Tummy"	September 26, 2018	1.11
Tensions blow up when Jadah arrives at the house in New Orleans. Walt confronts Ceaser about calling him a drunk. Black Ink NOLA's grand opening party goes south when Sky lunges at the bartender and the cops are called.
108	4	"Three Losers With Diced Tomatoes"	October 3, 2018	1.00
Ceaser loses it when he discovers the New Orleans shop is completely trashed just before opening day. Donna seeks revenge on Ted for Jadah's firing. A pool party turns into a full out brawl.
109	5	"Hotdog Water and Abandoned Buildings"	October 10, 2018	1.09
Ceaser fumes after learning that an employee was a mole. Bae lets Ceaser's enemies take over the 113th shop. Alex's father faces major surgery. Ceaser comes face to face with former best friend turned rival.
110	6	"My Favorite Smurf"	October 17, 2018	0.92
To get back in Ceaser's good graces, Bae hires a new receptionist. Cheyenne calls Ceaser out for being an absentee parent. Jadah attacks her replacement. Alex blows up when he hears that Donna reconnected with her ex.
111	7	"The Power of the Headband"	October 24, 2018	1.04
The crew heads to New Jersey for a weekend of team-building exercises. Jadah breaks down after a traumatic event. Bae invites her mom to stay with them, causing Rob to freak out. Tokie spirals after receiving a phone call.
112	8	"Two Grapes on Pool Tables"	October 31, 2018	0.99
Sky finds out some big news about her son Des. Tokie tries to work through issues from her past. Donna gives Ceaser an ultimatum. Rob struggles to deal with Bae's mom living in their home. An unexpected guest pops up.
113	9	"Signature Not Required"	November 7, 2018	1.06
Sky grows concerned after Des drops a bomb about his life in Texas. Melody and Lalo's relationship is on the rocks. Donna attempts to apologize to Ceaser and Kitty gets fired up when a woman comes for her job.
114	10	"Your Dog's Sister"	November 14, 2018	0.91
Ceaser freaks out when Sky tells him she wants to open a shop in Miami. Jadah gets revenge on Ted after finding out that he's officially dating Tati. Lalo breaks up with Melody.
115	11	"Always Kill Donna!"	November 28, 2018	1.00
Ceaser makes a bold move when he finds out that Sky betrayed him. Donna and her twin sister feud over Alex; Melody makes a shocking announcement. Bae's mother puts pressure on Bae to get married before she leaves in two weeks.
116	12	"Sky Priority"	December 5, 2018	1.04
After Ceaser shockingly fires Sky, the shop descends into chaos. Bae and Rob receive devastating news. Sky plots her revenge on Ceaser. Ted is furious when Tati gets wasted at a Black Ink party and goes home with another guy.
117	13	"My Big Fat Black Ink Wedding"	December 12, 2018	1.09
The crew heads to Westchester for Bae's wedding weekend. Tati attempts to make amends with Ted. Sky opens her boutique in Miami. Bae's rehearsal dinner turns into chaos when Donna and Alex show up.
118	14	"The Black Ink Survivor's Club"	December 19, 2018	1.14
Bae's wedding is in flux after a family emergency. Ceaser melts down over his father-of-the-bride duties. Ted and Tati take a big step in their relationship. Sky's unexpected arrival throws the wedding into chaos.
119	15	"While On Duty, You Can Get Booty"	March 13, 2019	0.85
Sky is confronted by a dangerous man from her past. Alex is rushed to the emergency room; Ceaser chaperones his daughter's date. Everyone panics when an unknown assailant commits a shocking act of violence against the shop.
120	16	"I Love Shopping! I Love America!"	March 20, 2019	1.01
The crew is concerned about their safety after an act of violence is perpetrated against the shop. Sky comes to the rescue when Bae discovers the extent of her mother's credit card debt. Tati confronts Ted about his behavior.
121	17	"Ocean's 113"	March 27, 2019	0.97
The crew heads to the casino to raise money for Walt. Donna and Alex set out to destroy Ceaser. Tati flips when she discovers shocking news about Ted. Paramedics rush to the scene to aid an unresponsive Ceaser.
122	18	"Always Bet on Black Ink"	April 3, 2019	1.03
Donna joins forces with Ceaser's biggest enemy. the crew risks it all at the casino to help Walt. Sky's son Des meets his biological father for the first time. Ceaser is in for a surprise.
123	19	"Peace Out America!"	April 10, 2019	0.96
The crew throws a going-away party for Mama Bae. Alex snaps at Donna. Ceaser receives devastating news. Bae attacks Kitty for talking behind her back.
124	20	"Purification Vacation"	April 17, 2019	0.84
The crew heads to sunny LA to help Sky with her groundbreaking twerk fashion show -- and for spiritual cleansing. Kitty attempts to make things right with Bae. Tati faces the wrath of everyone.
125	21	"Runner Up for Mother Teresa 2"	April 24, 2019	0.85
Sky hosts her twerk fashion show in Los Angeles. Ceaser comes face to face with Puma, his biggest enemy. Krystal confronts her estranged father. Donna taunts Ceaser from the fashion show stage.
126	22	"Free Coats"	May 1, 2019	0.94
Ceaser and Alex face off. Tati apologizes to the crew, but Tokie refuses to play nice. Sky tries to get Ceaser to face the demons from his past.

=== Season 8 (2019–20) ===
No. overall	No. in season	Title	Original release date	US viewers (millions)
127	1	"Cease Is 50"	August 14, 2019	1.17
Cease makes Puma a partner at 113th only to have his decision be questioned during his 40th birthday celebration. Bae struggles to keep her marriage together. Sky confronts her son Des.
128	2	"De-wigged"	August 21, 2019	1.15
Walt brings his new girlfriend by the shop, which causes Donna to catch a flashback. Young Bae and Rob face difficulties in their marriage. Sky is at a crossroads with her relationship with Des.
129	3	"Tinkerbell Just Escaped Jail"	August 28, 2019	1.00
Kit's mom passes away in D.C. and the news rocks the shop. Donna and Walt duke it out over Jessica. Puma hires new girl London and Bae thinks Puma's motives are shady.
130	4	"Don't Mess with Taxes"	September 4, 2019	0.98
Puma hires London to cover for Kitty, which disrupts the precarious balance in the shop. Tati has a run-in with the law. Donna faces a major financial setback. Puma tries to bring a little peace to 113th but no good deed goes unpunished.
131	5	"Chop Suey Out the Booty"	September 11, 2019	0.88
In an effort to support Miss Kitty, Ceaser and the crew head down to Memphis, Tenn., so she can reconnect with her mother's roots. Krystal confronts Donna about her behavior during the lock-in.
132	6	"Black Ink Blues"	September 18, 2019	1.01
The crew continues their stay in Memphis to pay their respects to Kitty's mom. London decides to throw a house party to promote the brand Down South. Walt wants take his relationship with Jessica to the next step. Mike receives some unexpected news.
133	7	"Moneymakers, Bootyshakers and Dealbreakers"	September 25, 2019	0.96
Ceaser has a new opportunity to expand Black Ink but not everyone is happy with the deal, leaving him to question where loyalties lie. Donna plans a girls' night that's full of rowdy surprises. Walt and Jess can't see eye to eye.
134	8	"Peanut Butter in Your Timbs"	October 2, 2019	1.00
An unexpected drug test has Tati freaking out. Sky announces a huge surprise. Quani makes a decision that shocks Puma. Rok airs out his dirty laundry. Ceaser has a dangerous run-in with the police.
135	9	"Big Daddy Got Back"	October 9, 2019	1.08
Ceaser deals with the fallout of his arrest. Alex and Donna try to get their magic back in the bedroom. Bae confronts a shocking diagnosis. Sky embarks on a new venture.
136	10	"Nice Day for a Shotgun Wedding"	October 16, 2019	0.99
Donna brings up people in Brooklyn talking trash about the upcoming Black Ink, which sets Ceaser off on a spiral through the past. Walt tries to make amends with Jessica. Sky embarks on a new business adventure.
137	11	"No Sleep Till Brooklyn"	October 23, 2019	0.68
The crew prepares for the grand opening of the Brooklyn shop. Ted comes clean to Ceaser and Puma about why he's been so absent. Mike finally receives his long-awaited paternity test.
138	12	"Jaw Dropped"	October 30, 2019	0.74
The Brooklyn shop is finally open and Ceaser throws a block party to celebrate the grand opening. After Donna gives Alex an ultimatum, things don't go as expected. Crystal has a new jaw and a new attitude.
139	13	"Basic and Predictable"	November 6, 2019	0.69
Rumors swirl about the altercation between Crystal and Miss Kitty. Sky struggles with the future of her Miami shop. News that Tati is dating a new man causes issues for Ted. O'S**t returns and Puma attempts to broker peace between him and Ceasar.
140	14	"Fake Slim Shady"	November 13, 2019	0.75
The crew goes to Cleveland for Walt's first show on his comedy tour and to see Donna's hometown. Alex meets Donna's family for the first time and things don't go smoothly.
141	15	"Lawyer Up!"	November 20, 2019	0.77
Walt begins his first comedy tour in Cleveland. Kitty threatens Ceaser with the law. Alex tries to get the approval of Donna's dad.
142	16	"Black Ink Prom"	November 27, 2019	0.72
An upcoming Black Ink Prom brings out fierce competition for King and Queen. Q helps Crystal get back with Ceasar. One of Donna's tattoo client sends a disturbing letter to the shop.
143	17	"The Problem With Torture Is Everybody Confesses"	February 26, 2020	0.75
The crew is still reeling from the disastrous prom when Ceaser's most prized possession turns up missing. He launches an investigation into the potential thief which leads to some surprising decisions. Sky's son Des tries to track down his mom.
144	18	"You're Not Being Nice, Apparent-Nice"	March 4, 2020	0.71
The news of Sky's suspension rocks the crew while Donna can't accept her apprentice demotion. Ceaser gets political and organizes a voter drive while Q faces a reckoning when his mom visits. Ceaser declares war on Ryan from 9MAG.
145	19	"Dogs Are More Loyal Than Kits"	March 11, 2020	0.70
Ceaser fumes over the video with Ryan and Kitty and plots revenge. Donna attempts to get her job back. Bae gets set up by a matchmaker and finds an unlikely bond with Rok. Walt and Jess' engagement party goes wheels off.
146	20	"Mr. Robinson If You’re Nasty"	March 18, 2020	0.72
After a disastrous engagement party, Walt and Jess attend premarital counseling while the rest of the crew encourage Bae to face her biggest fear - confronting her abusive father.
147	21	"My Name is Earl"	March 25, 2020	0.87
Ceaser and the 113th crew travel to Philly for a tattoo convention and run into some frenemies. Jess has second thoughts about the wedding and Bae meets with her father one last time.
148	22	"Mighty Ceaser Betrayed"	April 1, 2020	0.77
Ceaser fires his shot at Ryan and the two confront each other in a showdown. Relationship issues continue to worry Donna and Alex. Walt has his own tale of woe. Ceaser receives some news that could threaten the very existence of Black Ink New York.
149	23	"Black Ink Matters"	April 8, 2020	0.81
Ceaser and the crew are still reeling from the news that the landlord wants them out of 113th in 30 days. Ceaser decides to do everything in his power to save the shop. Meanwhile, Donna has an uncomfortable chat with Tati, and Walt hits rock bottom.
150	24	"Niko's Going to Have a Cousin?"	April 15, 2020	0.75
Walt and Jess decide on a destination wedding but when nobody responds to their invite they reach out to other friends from their past. Ceaser continues to deal with the prospect of losing 113th and the crew discovers Ted might have a wife.
151	25	"Ka Mate"	April 22, 2020	0.78
Walt and Jess have a destination wedding in Hawaii. The 113th crew surprise the couple on the island but Ceaser gets the biggest surprise of all. Alex plans a big surprise of his own for Donna but Tati's secrets threaten to blow up everything.
152	26	"It's Like Rain on Your Wedding Day"	April 29, 2020	0.98
On the season finale, the crew attempts to keep it together for another day in paradise while Cease refuses a surprise reuniting with loathed O'S**t. Kit defies pressure from Donna and Tati to leave the island. Alex finally pops the question to Donna.

=== Season 9 (2021–22) ===
No. overall	No. in season	Title	Original release date	U.S. viewers (millions)
153	1	"Black in Business"	April 19, 2021	N/A
154	2	"New Levels, New Devils"	April 26, 2021	N/A
155	3	"Foot in That Sauce"	May 3, 2021	N/A
156	4	"Mile High Ink"	May 10, 2021	N/A
157	5	"My Little Broke Friends"	May 17, 2021	N/A
158	6	"Between a Rok and a Hard Place"	May 24, 2021	N/A
159	7	"The Story of the Spyder and the Fish"	May 31, 2021	N/A
160	8	"It's Better When a Woman is in Charge"	June 7, 2021	N/A
161	9	"Ships and Honey Dips"	June 14, 2021	N/A
162	10	"Bye-Bye Atlanta!"	June 21, 2021	N/A
Part 2
163	11	"Vax the Block"	February 21, 2022	0.42
164	12	"Meet The Press"	February 28, 2022	0.39
165	13	"Not Another Team Building"	March 7, 2022	0.32
166	14	"Customer Service 101"	March 14, 2022	0.31
167	15	"Black Is Beautiful"	March 21, 2022	0.29
168	16	"Silicone Valley"	March 28, 2022	0.28
169	17	"Equanimity"	April 4, 2022	0.30
170	18	"Bae's Bae"	April 11, 2022	0.34
171	19	"Tooth or Consequences"	April 18, 2022	0.30
172	20	"Black Ink Milwaukee"	April 25, 2022	0.31
173	21	"Show Up to Showdown"	May 2, 2022	0.29
174	22	"Battle of the Tattoo Titans"	May 9, 2022	0.29

=== Season 10 (2022–23) ===
No. overall	No. in season	Title	Original release date	U.S. viewers (millions)
175	1	"Ten Years in the Making"	October 18, 2022	0.27
176	2	"Houston, We Have a Problem"	October 25, 2022	0.24
177	3	"I Will Be Your Rok"	November 1, 2022	0.23
178	4	"The Last Supper"	November 8, 2022	0.28
179	5	"Guess Who's Coming To Black Ink?"	November 15, 2022	0.20
180	6	"Black Ink & Harlem Are Like PB&J"	November 22, 2022	0.18
181	7	"So Much for a Mental Health Day"	November 29, 2022	N/A
182	8	"Florida Man"	December 6, 2022	N/A
183	9	"Later Gator"	December 13, 2022	N/A
184	10	"What Happens Now?"	December 20, 2022	N/A
Part 2
185	11	"Six Weeks Later"	May 15, 2023	0.22
186	12	"Quit While You're a Ted"	May 22, 2023	0.17
187	13	"BIC: The New Class"	May 29, 2023	0.21
188	14	"Tederal Issues"	June 5, 2023	N/A
189	15	"Welcome to NJ!"	June 12, 2023	N/A
190	16	"Su Casa Es Mi Casa"	June 19, 2023	N/A
191	17	"The Art of Revenge"	June 26, 2023	N/A
192	18	"Another Last Supper"	July 3, 2023	N/A
193	19	"Peace, Love and Hair Grease"	July 10, 2023	N/A
194	20	"Black Ink: I Do's and I Dont's"	July 17, 2023	N/A
195	21	"The Mean Girls Club"	July 24, 2023	N/A
196	22	"The New Black Ink Harlem"	July 31, 2023	N/A
