= Black Ink Crew =

American reality television series

- Also known as: Black Ink Crew: New York
- Genre: Reality television
- Starring: Ceaser Emanuel; Sassy Bermudez; O'Shit Duncan; Alex Estevez; Dutchess Lattimore; Puma Robinson; Sky Days; Teddy Ruks; Donna Lombardi; Walt Miller; Melody Mitchell; Young Bae; Miss Kitty; Tatiana; Alex; Spyder
- Country of origin: United States
- Original language: English
- No. of seasons: 10
- No. of episodes: 196 (list of episodes)

Production
- Executive producers: Dan Cesareo; Doug DePriest; Ken Martinez; Kari Mcfarland; David Wolfgang; Ceaser Emanuel
- Running time: 42–43 minutes
- Production companies: Big Fish Entertainment (2013–2020); MTV Entertainment Studios (2021–2023)

Original release
- Network: VH1
- Release: January 7, 2013 – July 31, 2023

Related
- Black Ink Crew: Chicago; Black Ink Crew: Los Angeles

Black Ink Crew is an American reality television series that premiered on January 7, 2013, on VH1. It has aired ten seasons and chronicles the daily operations and staff drama at an African American–owned and operated tattoo shop in the Harlem neighborhood of New York City.

The show's success has resulted in similar spin-off series based in Chicago and Los Angeles.

== Production ==
Black Ink Crew's second season premiered on September 23, 2013, with the season returning on March 31, 2014, for five more episodes.

The third season premiered on January 26, 2015, with the season returning August 24, 2015 for eight more episodes and a reunion special on October 19, 2015.

The show was renewed for a fourth season, which premiered on April 4, 2016. In December 2016, the series was renewed for a fifth season, which premiered on January 18, 2017. The sixth season premiered on December 6, 2017. On August 20, 2018, the series was renewed for a seventh season, which premiered on September 19, 2018, with the season returning March 13, 2019, for eight more episodes. On July 24, 2019, the series was renewed for an eighth season, which premiered on August 14, 2019, with the season returning on February 26, 2020, for ten more episodes. On March 8, 2021, the series was renewed for a ninth season, which premiered on April 19, 2021. The second half of season nine premiered on February 21, 2022.

On September 27, 2022, the series was renewed for a tenth season, which premiered on October 18, 2022. The second half of season ten premiered on May 15, 2023. The show did not get renewed for another season after the face of the show, Caesar Emanuel got ousted for animal abuse.

== Cast ==
=== Main ===
- Ceaser (born David Emanuel; seasons 1–9, supporting in season 10), the owner of Black Ink in Harlem, New York, who also owns tattoo studios in Brooklyn, Atlanta, Orlando and Houston
- Dutchess (born Crystana Lattimore; seasons 1–5), a former tattoo artist for Black Ink and the owner of Pretty-N-Ink
- O'Shit (censored onscreen as "O'S**t", born Richard Duncan; seasons 1–5, supporting in seasons 6–7, guest in seasons 8–9), a former tattoo artist at Black Ink
- Alex Estevez (seasons 1–2), a former receptionist at Black Ink
- Puma (born Paul Robinson; seasons 1–4, 8–10, supporting in season 7, guest in season 6), the former public relations manager at Black Ink and owner of Art2Ink
- Sassy (born Ashley Nicole Bermudez; seasons 1–3, supporting in seasons 4 & 8, guest in season 9), the former manager of Black Ink and manager of Art2Ink
- Sky (born JaKeita Days; seasons 2–8, guest in season 1), the former receptionist at Black Ink and former manager of Black Ink Atlanta
- Teddy Ruks (born Shariff Homer; seasons 4–10, supporting in seasons 1–3), the former assistant manager at Black Ink and Ceaser's cousin
- Donna Marie Lombardi (born Taylor Pinckney; seasons 4–9, supporting in season 3), a former apprentice of Ceaser and Dutchess, tattoo artist and piercer for Art2Ink
- Melody Mitchell (seasons 6–7, supporting in seasons 4–5), a former tattoo artist and manager at Black Ink
- Walter Miller (seasons 6–9, supporting in seasons 1–5), the assistant manager of Black Ink 113th
- Young Bae (seasons 6–10, supporting in season 5), a tattoo artist at Black Ink
- Miss Kitty (born Karis Phillips; season 8, supporting in seasons 5–7), the former brand ambassador for Black Ink.
- Tatiana Ritter (seasons 9–10, supporting in seasons 6–8), the manager for Black Ink
- Alex (season 10, supporting in seasons 6–9), a tattoo artist at Black Ink
- Spyder (season 10, supporting in season 9), a tattoo artist at Black Ink

=== Cast timeline ===
Main cast members
Cast member	Seasons									
Cast member	1	2	3	4	5	6	7	8	9	10
Ceaser Emanuel	Starring									Supporting
Dutchess Lattimore	Starring									
Richard “O'Shit” Duncan	Starring					Supporting		Guest		
Alex Estevez	Starring (Note: Alex is replaced by Sky during episodes 14-18.)									
Puma Robinson	Starring					Guest	Supporting	Starring		
Sassy Bermudez	Starring			Supporting				Supporting	Guest	
Sky Days	Guest	Starring (Note: Sky replaces Alex during episodes 14-18.)	Starring					Starring (Note: Sky is removed from the show in episode 18 due to a physical altercation with her son, Des.)		
Ted Ruks	Supporting			Starring						
Donna Lombardi			Supporting	Starring					Starring (Note: Donna is no longer a part of Black Ink Crew after episode 11.)	
Melody Mitchell				Supporting		Starring	Starring (Note: Melody is removed from the opening credits after episode 14.)			
Walt Miller	Supporting					Starring			Starring (Note: Walt is no longer a part of Black Ink Crew after episode 12.)	
Young Bae					Supporting	Starring				
Miss Kitty					Supporting			Starring		
Tatti Ritter						Supporting			Starring	
Alex						Supporting				Starring
Spyder									Supporting	Starring
Supporting cast members
Cast member	Seasons									
Cast member	1	2	3	4	5	6	7	8	9	10
Quani Robinson	Supporting							Supporting		
Kathie Arseno	Supporting				Guest					
Tiffany Winter		Supporting								
Naeem Sharif				Supporting			Guest			
Young Phoenix				Supporting			Guest			
Tiffany Perez	Guest				Supporting					
Kevin Laroy					Supporting		Guest			Guest
Nikki Duncan					Supporting	Guest				
Jadah Blue						Supporting				
Tokie Renet							Supporting			
Des Raymond						Guest	Supporting			
Genesis Ezekiel							Guest	Supporting		
Mama Bae						Guest	Supporting	Guest		
Krystal Kills							Supporting			
Charmaine Walker							Supporting			
SuperDope Q								Supporting		
Mike Ac								Supporting		Guest
London								Supporting		
Rokmatic								Supporting		
Jessica Miller				Guest				Supporting	Guest	
Crystal Torres	Guest					Guest		Supporting	Guest	
Euni Ruks								Supporting	Guest	
Vanity									Supporting	
Desiree									Supporting	
Van Johnson									Supporting	Guest
Draya Penzo									Supporting	
Suzette Samuel									Supporting	Guest
Bux									Supporting	
Nychelle										Supporting
AMH										Supporting (Note: Appears on the show from episode twelve onwards.)
Liza										Supporting (Note: Appears on the show from episode twelve onwards.)
Made Rich										Supporting (Note: Appears on the show from episode thirteen onwards.)
Jahnova										Supporting (Note: Appears on the show from episode thirteen onwards.)
Santana										Supporting (Note: Appears on the show from episode thirteen onwards.)
Trilla										Supporting (Note: Appears on the show from episode thirteen onwards.)
Ink Dreamy										Supporting (Note: Appears on the show from episode thirteen onwards.)
Miracle										Supporting (Note: Appears on the show from episode thirteen onwards.)

== Episodes ==
Season	Episodes		Originally released	
Season	Episodes		First released	Last released
1	13		January 7, 2013	March 25, 2013
2	18		September 23, 2013	April 28, 2014
3	21		January 26, 2015	October 19, 2015
4	12		April 4, 2016	June 27, 2016
5	19		January 18, 2017	July 12, 2017
6	21		December 6, 2017	May 9, 2018
7	22		September 19, 2018	May 1, 2019
8	26		August 14, 2019	April 29, 2020
9	22	10	April 19, 2021	June 21, 2021
9	22	12	February 21, 2022	May 9, 2022
10	22	10	October 18, 2022	December 20, 2022
10	22	12	May 15, 2023	July 31, 2023

== See also ==
- List of tattoo TV shows
