= Vanessa Carlton discography =

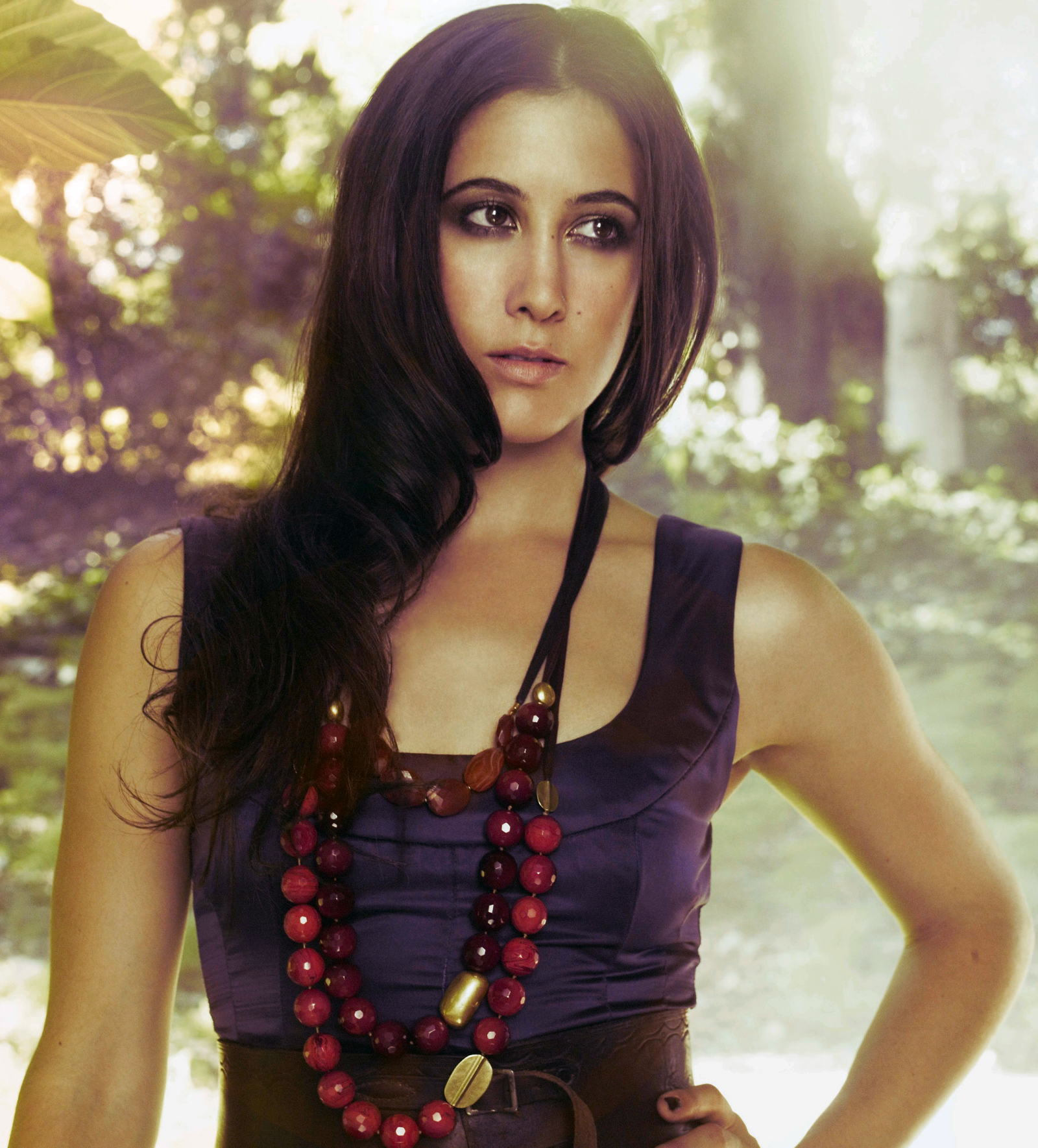
- Studio albums: 7
- Extended plays: 3
- Soundtrack albums: 1
- Live albums: 2
- Compilation albums: 1
- Singles: 18
- Music videos: 14

The discography of American singer-songwriter and pianist Vanessa Carlton consists of seven studio albums and 18 singles.

== Albums ==
=== Studio albums ===
Title	Details	Peak chart positions										Sales	Certifications (sales threshold)
Title	Details	US	AUS	AUT	FRA	GER	JPN	NLD	NZL	SWI	UK	Sales	Certifications (sales threshold)
Be Not Nobody	Release date: April 30, 2002; Label: A&M; Formats: CD, download	5	13	13	17	7	17	14	23	15	7	US: 1,380,000	RIAA: Platinum; ARIA: Gold; BPI: Gold; MC: Gold; RIAJ: Platinum
Harmonium	Release date: November 9, 2004; Label: A&M; Formats: CD, download	33	—	—	—	—	52	—	—	—	—	US: 179,000	
Heroes & Thieves	Release date: October 9, 2007; Label: The Inc. / Universal Motown; Formats: CD, download	44	—	—	—	—	—	—	—	—	—	US: 75,000	
Rabbits on the Run	Release date: July 26, 2011; Label: Razor & Tie; Formats: CD, vinyl, download	62	—	—	—	—	—	—	—	—	—	US: 22,000	
Liberman	Release date: October 23, 2015; Label: Dine Alone; Formats: CD, vinyl, download, cassette	—	—	—	—	—	—	—	—	—	—		
Love Is an Art	Release date: March 27, 2020; Label: Dine Alone; Formats: CD, vinyl, download	—	—	—	—	—	—	—	—	—	—		
Veils	Release date: April 17, 2026; Label: Liberman; Formats: CD, vinyl, download	—	—	—	—	—	—	—	—	—	—		
"—" denotes releases that did not chart or were not released to that country

=== Compilation albums ===
Title	Details
Icon: Best of Vanessa Carlton	Release date: January 4, 2011; Label: A&M; Formats: CD, download
Double Live & Covers	Release date: November 23, 2018; Label: Dine Alone Records; Formats: Vinyl
Piano Songs	Release date: October 16, 2020; Label: Universal Music; Formats: CD, Download

=== Live albums ===
Title	Details
Liberman Live	Release date: October 21, 2016; Label: Dine Alone; Formats: CD, download
Earlier Things Live	Release date: February 17, 2017; Label: Victor Music; Formats: CD, download

== Extended plays ==
Title	Details
Ordinary Day	Release date: 2002; Label: A&M; Format: CD
Hear the Bells	Release date: November 21, 2011; Label: Razor & Tie; Format: Download
Blue Pool EP	Release date: July 24, 2015; Label: Dine Alone; Format: Download

== Singles ==
=== As lead artist ===
Year	Title	Peak chart positions										Certifications (sales threshold)	Album
Year	Title	US	US Adult	US Pop	AUS	AUT	FRA	NLD	NZL	SWI	UK	Certifications (sales threshold)	Album
2002	"A Thousand Miles"	5	2	1	1	12	8	12	4	8	6	ARIA: 2× Platinum; BPI: 2× Platinum; RMNZ: 3× Platinum; SNEP: Silver	Be Not Nobody
2002	"Ordinary Day"	30	29	9	48	—	—	73	17	64	53		Be Not Nobody
2003	"Pretty Baby"	—	—	21	—	—	—	86	—	62	94		Be Not Nobody
2004	"White Houses"	86	27	25	—	—	—	—	—	—	—		Harmonium
2007	"Nolita Fairytale"	—	26	—	—	—	—	—	—	—	—		Heroes & Thieves
2008	"Hands on Me"	—	30	—	—	—	—	—	—	—	—		Heroes & Thieves
2011	"Carousel"	—	—	—	—	—	—	—	—	—	—		Rabbits on the Run
2011	"I Don't Want to Be a Bride"	—	—	—	—	—	—	—	—	—	—		Rabbits on the Run
2012	"Hear the Bells"	—	—	—	—	—	—	—	—	—	—		Rabbits on the Run
2015	"Operator"	—	—	—	—	—	—	—	—	—	—		Liberman
2015	"House of Seven Swords"	—	—	—	—	—	—	—	—	—	—		Liberman
2016	"Nothing Where Something Used to Be"	—	—	—	—	—	—	—	—	—	—		Liberman
2020	"The Only Way to Love"	—	—	—	—	—	—	—	—	—	—		Love Is an Art
2020	"Future Pain"	—	—	—	—	—	—	—	—	—	—		Love Is an Art
2025	"Animal"	—	—	—	—	—	—	—	—	—	—		Veils
2026	"Great House"	—	—	—	—	—	—	—	—	—	—		Veils
"—" denotes releases that did not chart

=== As featured artist ===
Year	Single	Artist	Peak chart positions										Certifications (sales threshold)	Album
Year	Single	Artist	US	US Adult	US Pop	AUS	AUT	FRA	NLD	NZL	SWI	UK	Certifications (sales threshold)	Album
2002	"Big Yellow Taxi"	Counting Crows	42	5	30	3	40	—	23	4	63	16	RIAA: Gold; BPI: Silver; RMNZ: 2× Platinum; ARIA: Platinum	Hard Candy
2004	"Everybody's Got to Learn Sometime"	Zucchero	—	—	—	—	56	39	90	—	—	—		Zu & Co.

== Collaborations ==
Year	Song	Artist	Album
2004	"Indaco Dagli Occhi Del Cielo"	Zucchero	Zu & Co.
2009	"Circle Dance"	Stevie Nicks	The Soundstage Sessions
2014	"Carousel"	Stevie Nicks	24 Karat Gold: Songs from the Vault

=== B-sides ===
Year	B-side	A-side
2002	"Twilight" (live) "Wanted" (Ripe Mix) "Paradise" (Piano-Vocal) "Red Ditty"	"A Thousand Miles"
2002	"A Thousand Miles" (live) "Swindler" "Paradise" (Piano-Vocal) "Ordinary Day" (Piano-Vocal) "A Thousand Miles" (Piano-Vocal)	"Ordinary Day"
2003	"Twilight" (live) "A Thousand Miles" (live) "Swindler" "Red Ditty"	"Pretty Baby"
2004	"C'est La Vie" (live) "Papa" (live)	"White Houses"

== Other contributions ==
Year	Song	Album
2002	"Greensleeves"	Maybe This Christmas
2003	"Wishin' and Hopin'"	American Dreams OST
2011	"Happy Xmas (War Is Over)"	2011 Paste Magazine Christmas Sampler

== Music videos ==
Year	Single	Album	Director
2002	"A Thousand Miles"	Be Not Nobody	Marc Klasfeld
2002	"Ordinary Day"	Be Not Nobody	Marc Klasfeld
2002	"Pretty Baby"	Be Not Nobody	Marcos Siega
2004	"White Houses"	Harmonium	Sophie Muller
2007	"Nolita Fairytale"	Heroes & Thieves	Marc Klasfeld
2008	"Hands on Me"	Heroes & Thieves	Marc Klasfeld
2011	"Carousel"	Rabbits on the Run	Jake Davis
2012	"Hear the Bells"	Rabbits on the Run	Jake Davis
2013	"I'll Wait for You"		Sean Suozzi
2015	"Young Heart"		
2015	"Blue Pool"	Liberman	Jesse Deflorio
2015	"Operator"	Liberman	Daniel Henry
2015	"House of Seven Swords"	Liberman	Daniel Henry
2016	"Nothing Where Something Used to Be"	Liberman	Colin Devin Moore
2019	"Future Pain"	Love Is An Art	Joshua Shoemaker
2020	"The Only Way To Love"	Love Is An Art	Joshua Shoemaker
2020	"Die, Dinosaur"	Love Is An Art	Patrick McPheron
2020	"Back To Life"	Love Is An Art	Patrick McPheron
2020	"Break To Save"	Love Is An Art	Patrick McPheron
2025	"Animal"	Veils	Patrick McPheron
2026	"Great House"	Veils	Patrick McPheron
