= List of awards and nominations received by Vanessa Carlton =

Vanessa Carlton awards and nominations
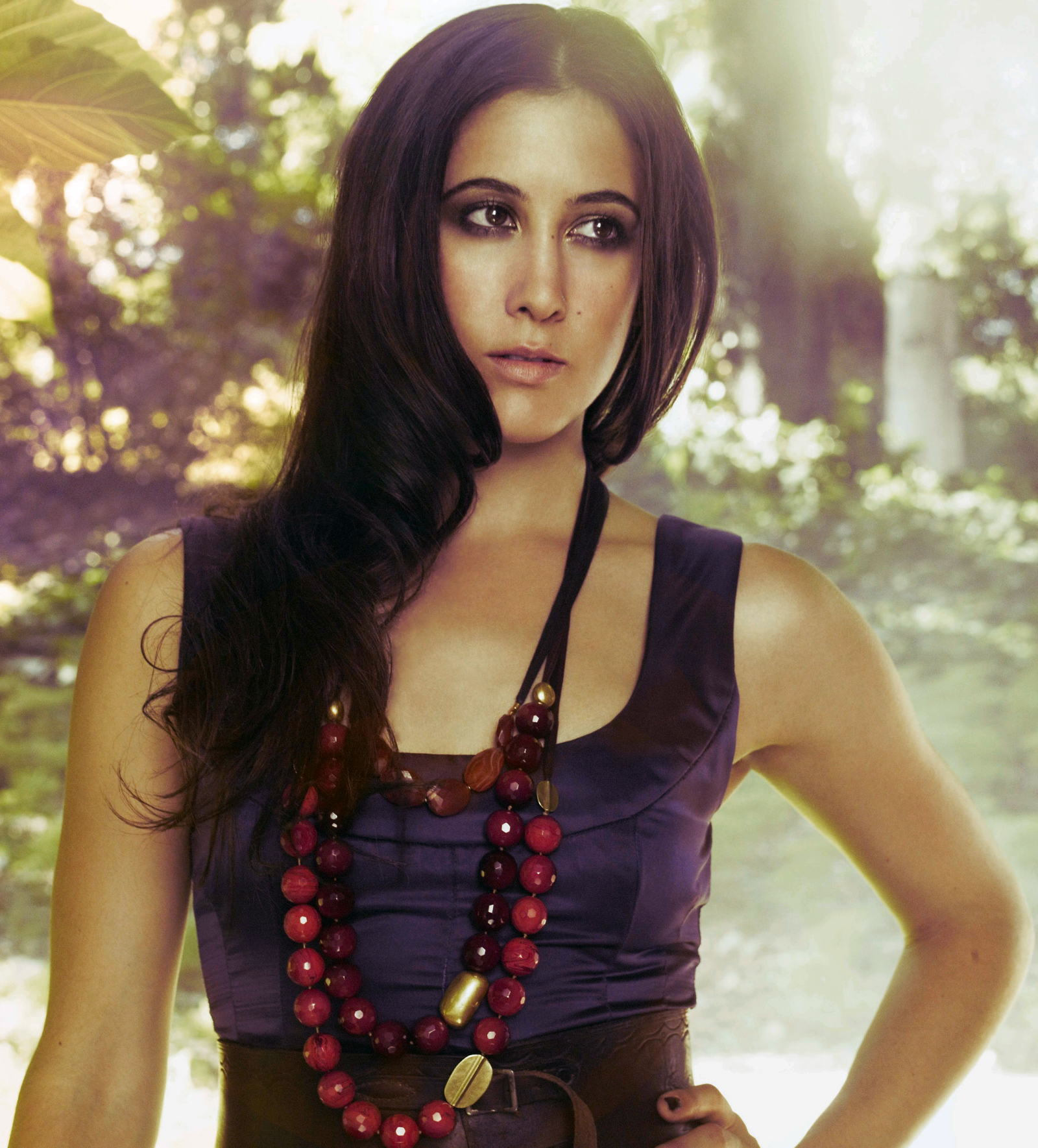
- Carlton in 2010
Awards and nominations
Award	Wins	Nominations
American Music Awards	0	1
Grammy	0	3
Teen Choice	0	3

Totals (Note: Certain award groups do not simply award one winner. They acknowledge several different recipients, have runners-up, and have third place. Since this is a specific recognition and is different from losing an award, runner-up mentions are considered wins in this award tally. For simplification and to avoid errors, each award in this list has been presumed to have had a prior nomination.)
- Wins: 4
- Nominations: 17

The American singer-songwriter and pianist Vanessa Carlton has received multiple nominations, including three Grammy Awards nominations and six Billboard Music Awards nominations. She has received four awards.

== American Music Awards ==
Year	Nominee / work	Award	Result
2003	Herself	Favorite Adult Contemporary Artist	Nominated

== APRA Music Awards ==
Year	Nominee / work	Award	Result
2003	"A Thousand Miles"	Most Performed Foreign Work	Nominated

== BDSCertified Spin Awards ==
Year	Nominee / work	Award	Result
2003	"A Thousand Miles"	500,000 Spins	Won

== BMI Pop Awards ==
Year	Nominee / work	Award	Result
2003	"A Thousand Miles"	Award-Winning Song	Won

== Billboard Music Awards ==
Year	Nominee / work	Award	Result
2002	Herself	New Artist of the Year	Nominated
2002	Herself	Top Hot 100 Artist - Female	Nominated
2002	"A Thousand Miles"	Top Hot Top 40 Track	Nominated
2002	"A Thousand Miles"	Top Adult Top 40 Track	Nominated
2003	"A Thousand Miles"	Top Adult Contemporary Track	Nominated
2003	Herself	Top Adult Contemporary Artist	Nominated

== Grammy Awards ==
Year	Nominee / work	Award	Result
2003	"A Thousand Miles"	Record of the Year	Nominated
2003	"A Thousand Miles"	Song of the Year	Nominated
2003	"A Thousand Miles"	Best Instrumental Arrangement Accompanying Vocalist(s)	Nominated

== Japan Gold Disc Awards ==
Year	Nominee / work	Award	Result
2003	Herself	New Artist of The Year	Won

== Teen Choice Awards ==
Year	Nominee / work	Award	Result
2002	"A Thousand Miles"	Choice Summer Song	Nominated
2002	Herself	Choice Breakout Artist	Nominated
2003	"Pretty Baby"	Choice Love Song	Nominated

== VH1 Big Awards ==
Year	Nominee / work	Award	Result
2002	Herself	Lolita Ford Award	Nominated
2002	"A Thousand Miles"	Can't Get You Out of My Head	Won
