= Liberman (album) =

Studio album by Vanessa Carlton
- Released: October 23, 2015
- Recorded: March–July 2015
- Studios: Real World; Playground Sound
- Genre: Indie pop
- Length: 35:18
- Label: Dine Alone
- Producers: Steve Osborne; Adam Landry

Vanessa Carlton chronology
Rabbits on the Run (2011)	Liberman (2015)	Love Is an Art (2020)

Singles from Liberman
- 1. "Operator" Released: September 25, 2015; 2. "House of Seven Swords" Released: November 18, 2015; 3. "Nothing Where Something Used to Be" Released: April 8, 2016

Liberman is the fifth studio album by American singer-songwriter Vanessa Carlton, released in the US on October 23, 2015 and in the UK and Europe on April 29, 2016, through Dine Alone Records. It is the follow-up to Carlton's previous studio album Rabbits on the Run (2011) and marks her first release since signing with Dine Alone Records. The title of the album comes from an oil painting made by Carlton's late grandfather, whose given surname was Liberman.

== Background and writing ==
Following the 2011 release Rabbits on the Run, Carlton took time off to get married, start a family, and write another album. She told CBS News that these changes in her life are reflected in Liberman's songs, and that she "wanted the whole album to feel like an escape type of album, where you put it on and you feel like you're in this dreamy state."

To avoid preconceived notions, demos recorded were sent to Dine Alone Records without Carlton's name attached. Label president Joel Carriere says of hearing the demos:

The songs were amazing, it was atmospheric, it kind of fit into what we're all into ... and we never would have guessed it was Vanessa Carlton because her voice has developed so much since her pop songs 14 years ago and the songwriting had obviously changed. We were, like: "Yeah, we want to do this. But what is it we're doing?"

== Promotion ==
In support of the album, Carlton embarked on the "Liberman" tour throughout portions of the United States and Canada in the fall of 2015 and winter of 2016. Special guest on the tour was Joshua Hyslop. The tour continued in the UK and Europe in the spring of 2016.

== Singles ==
The first single, "Operator", was released for digital download on September 25, 2015. A music video for the single, directed by Daniel Henry, was released on October 13, 2015. According to Carlton, the video shows the classic tale of children running away reversed, so instead the parents are running away. The second single, "House of Seven Swords", was released for digital download. Since Liberman was already released, it was not released separately, like "Operator", but it was made a single on November 18, 2015. Daniel Henry also directed a music video for "House of Seven Swords" which was released the same day as the single and shows Carlton playing piano and singing the song at home in Nashville. The Wall Street Journal writes of the video:

she takes her baby daughter out into the yard, making "House of Seven Swords" seem like sage advice from mother to child. In a way, Carlton says, it is. "At the same time, the song is absolutely a message to myself, too, probably," she says. Henry shot the footage they used in the video in about an hour while making a different clip with Carlton, and they fit the images to the song. "It was all very organic," she says.

Steve Osborne's remix of "Nothing Where Something Used To Be" was released worldwide as the third single off Liberman on April 8, 2016.

== Other songs ==
Other songs from Liberman were released with music and lyric videos for promotional purposes. "Young Heart", a song that does not appear on the album, was released as a "pre-single" with an "Official Dream Video" on April 20, 2015, as a way to release information that Carlton had signed with Dine Alone Records. A music video for "Blue Pool" was released on August 3, 2015, to promote the Blue Pool EP. A lyric video was released for "Willows" on August 27, 2015, as a way to reveal the album artwork, track listing, and release date. On November 17, 2015, The Wall Street Journal premiered the music video for "House of Seven Swords".

== Critical reception ==
Professional ratings
Aggregate scores
Source	Rating
Metacritic	77/100
Review scores
Source	Rating
AllMusic	4/5 stars
The Boston Globe	Positive
Glide Magazine	8/10
Paste	7.9/10
Pitchfork	7.8/10
PopMatters	8/10
Rolling Stone	2.5/5 stars

Liberman received mostly positive reviews from music critics. At Metacritic, which assigns a normalized rating out of 100 to reviews from mainstream critics, the album has an average score of 77 out of 100, which indicates "generally favorable reviews" based on 7 reviews.

Stephen Thomas Erlewine of AllMusic rated the album four out of five stars, stating: "Carlton is still avoiding any of the grand gestures that defined her earliest work but at this point, this quietly meditative pop feels like a truer reflection of her intentions than 'A Thousand Miles'." Pitchfork's Matthew Schnipper rated the album 7.8 out of ten, writing: "Carlton's voice is the key attraction on songs [from Liberman] that register between low-key pop, rock, and folk." The Boston Globe's Ken Capobianco states: "Carlton's reinvention finds her a long way from 'A Thousand Miles' – and in a better place, artistically."

== Track listing ==
Adapted from AllMusic and the album's liner notes.

No.	Title	Writer(s)	Producer(s)	Length
1.	"Take It Easy"	Vanessa Carlton; Steve Osborne	Osborne	5:32
2.	"Willows"	Carlton; Osborne	Osborne	2:53
3.	"House of Seven Swords"	Carlton; Osborne	Osborne	3:43
4.	"Operator"	Carlton; John J. McCauley III	Adam Landry	3:16
5.	"Blue Pool"	Carlton	Osborne	3:16
6.	"Nothing Where Something Used to Be"	Carlton; Osborne	Osborne	4:01
7.	"Matter of Time"	Carlton	Osborne	3:16
8.	"Unlock the Lock"	Carlton	Osborne	3:11
9.	"River"	Carlton	Landry	3:33
10.	"Ascension"	Carlton; McCauley III	Landry	2:37
Total length:				35:18

Deluxe edition bonus tracks
No.	Title	Writer(s)	Length
11.	"Blue Pool" (Living Room Session)	Carlton	2:42
12.	"River" (Living Room Session)	Carlton	2:50
13.	"Take It Easy" (Living Room Session)	Carlton; Osborne	4:29
14.	"Willows" (Living Room Session)	Carlton; Osborne	2:52
15.	"House of the Seven Swords" (Original Demo)	Carlton; Osborne	3:00
16.	"Operator" (Living Room Session)	Carlton; McCauley III	3:15
17.	"Unlock the Lock" (Living Room Session)	Carlton	3:11
18.	"Nothing Where Something Used to Be" (Living Room Session)	Carlton; Osborne	3:52

== Personnel ==
Credits adapted from AllMusic

Musicians

- Vanessa Carlton – keyboards, organ, piano, tambourine, vocals
- Adam Landry – drums, bass, electric guitar, acoustic guitar, synthesizer
- John J. McCauley III – drums, guitar, bass
- Steve Osborne – drums, guitar, bass, keyboards, synthesizer
- Skye Steele – violin

Technical

- Steve Osborne – mixing, producer
- Adam Landry – engineer, producer, programming
- Craig Alvin – mixing
- Rishon Blumberg – A&R
- Eddie Chacon – photography
- Jahved Crockett – design
- Jo Ratcliffe – art direction, illustration
- Skye Steele – string arrangement

== Charts ==
Weekly chart performance for Liberman
Chart (2015)	Peak position
US Independent Albums (Billboard)	32

== Release history ==
List of release dates, showing region, format(s), label and reference
Region	Date	Format(s)	Label	Ref.
United States	October 23, 2015	CD; digital download; vinyl; cassette	Dine Alone Records	
UK & Europe	April 29, 2016	CD; digital download	Dine Alone/Caroline Records	
