= Rabbits on the Run =

Studio album by Vanessa Carlton
- Released: July 26, 2011
- Recorded: April 2009 – April 2011
- Studio: Real World
- Genres: Pop; indie pop
- Length: 37:27
- Label: Razor & Tie
- Producer: Steve Osborne

Vanessa Carlton chronology
Icon: Best of Vanessa Carlton (2011)	Rabbits on the Run (2011)	Liberman (2015)

Singles from Rabbits on the Run
- 1. "Carousel" Released: May 3, 2011; 2. "Dear California" Released: July 6, 2011; 3. "I Don't Want to Be a Bride" Released: September 19, 2011; 4. "Hear the Bells" Released: June 7, 2012

Rabbits on the Run is the fourth studio album by American singer-songwriter Vanessa Carlton, released on July 26, 2011, through Razor & Tie.

== Background ==
On October 2, 2010, Vanessa Carlton tweeted that she had completed her fourth studio album. In February 2011, a video was posted to Carlton's official website. In the video, she explained the process for producing her album, and stated that she questioned whether or not she would make another record, as she had been experimenting with writing film scores. She further explained that after deciding to produce another record, Carlton felt she needed to create the ideal environment in order to produce what she felt was the perfect album. She said that she wanted to capture a creepy, honest, dreamy, fantastical sound with 'Rabbits on the Run', a title and concept inspired by books like Stephen Hawking's A Brief History of Time, and Richard Adams's Watership Down. In order to achieve that sound, Carlton recorded the album direct to tape and recruited a tight-knit team of collaborators, which included producer Steve Osborne, The Upwelling guitarist Ari Ingber, and My Morning Jacket drummer Patrick Hallahan. She also enlisted the help of a children's choir, namely the Capital Children's Choir, saying that some of her melodies were "just built" for choral arrangements. It was also mentioned in the video that the recording for the album took place in Peter Gabriel's Real World Studios in Box, England, which Carlton considered as the secret "fifth element she needed" to complete the album. The line "rabbits on the run" is from the lyrics of the first single "Carousel".

On March 1, 2011, it was announced that Carlton had signed with Razor & Tie.

On November 10, 2011, it was announced that an EP would be released, titled Hear the Bells. It contains the songs "Do You Hear What I Hear?", "Happy Xmas (War is Over)," as well as acoustic versions of her 2002 single "A Thousand Miles" and "Hear the Bells," the latter of which is featured on Rabbits on the Run.

== Promotion ==
Carlton performed the lead single "Carousel" on The Tonight Show with Jay Leno, and The Today Show, and was interviewed on Chelsea Lately. She also performed "I Don't Want to Be a Bride" on Conan.

Carlton recorded a "Master Class" for VH1, teaching viewers how to play "Carousel."

Carlton also conducted an interview with ABC News in June 2011, discussing the meaning behind the album's title.

As part of promoting the album, Vanessa recorded a cover of Mumford and Sons' "The Cave" for Billboard.com.

Carlton also covered a Brian Jonestown Massacre track, "David Bowie I Love You Since I Was Six" to promote the change in sound of her new material.

== Singles ==
The lead single from the album, "Carousel", was released on May 3, 2011. Its music video was released online May 16, 2011.

A duet version of "I Don't Want to Be a Bride" with KT Tunstall was performed in London in late 2011. The song was rumored to be the second single from the album, but with the exception of a reference from her management in September 2011, confirmation on the single never surfaced. On February 8, 2012, Carlton tweeted that her record label, Razor & Tie, was unable to "do Bride," and that "Hear The Bells" will be the second single instead, accompanied with a music video directed by Jake Davis. The music video for "Hear The Bells," which Carlton described as her most revealing to date, was released on June 7, 2012.

== Critical reception ==
Professional ratings
Aggregate scores
Source	Rating
Metacritic	72/100
Review scores
Source	Rating
AllMusic	3/5 stars
Entertainment Weekly	B+
Los Angeles Times	2.5/4 stars
PopMatters	8/10
Slant Magazine	3.5/5 stars

Rabbits on the Run received positive reviews from music critics. At Metacritic, which assigns a normalized rating out of 100 to reviews from mainstream critics, the album received an average score of 72, based on 6 reviews, indicating "generally favorable reviews". Stephen Thomas Erlewine of AllMusic rated the album three out of five stars and claims: "This is music made with no audience in mind: it is strikingly personal."

In August 2011, Amazon rated the album at No. 51 on their list of "Best Albums of 2011 So Far."

== Track listing ==
All tracks are written by Vanessa Carlton, except where noted.

No.	Title	Writer(s)	Length
1.	"Carousel"		3:16
2.	"I Don't Want to Be a Bride"	Carlton, Stephen John Osborne, Ari Ingber	4:01
3.	"London"		4:19
4.	"Fairweather Friend"		3:55
5.	"Hear the Bells"		3:44
6.	"Dear California"	Carlton, Ingber	3:19
7.	"Tall Tales for Spring"		4:28
8.	"Get Good"		3:54
9.	"The Marching Line"		3:32
10.	"In the End"		2:53
Total length:			37:25

iTunes Deluxe Edition Bonus Tracks
No.	Title	Length
11.	"Tall Tales For Spring (Acoustic Version)"	4:31
12.	"Carousel" (Acoustic Version)	3:03
13.	"London" (Acoustic Version)	4:16
14.	"Carousel" (music video)	3:22
15.	"The Four Elements of Rabbits On the Run" (video)	4:26
16.	"Behind the Scenes of the 'Carousel' Video" (video)	1:26

== Personnel ==
Credits adapted from AllMusic:

- Vanessa Carlton – vocals, harmonium, piano

Additional musicians

- Richard Ashton – French horn
- Ian Burdge – cello
- Capital Children's Choir – choir, chorus
- Patrick Hallahan – drums, percussion
- Richard Henry – tuba
- Ari Ingber – guitar
- Damian Johnson – drums, percussion
- Isaac Jones – drums (snare), timpani
- Trevor Mires – trombone
- Everton Nelson –violin
- Steve Osborne – bass, guitar, hammond B3, mellotron, percussion, piano
- Bruce White – viola
- Warren Zielinski – violin

Technical personnel

- Vanessa Carlton – string arrangement
- Steve Osborne – production, mixing, engineer
- Dan Austin – engineer
- Robin Baynton – transcription, engineer
- Andrew Dudman – engineer
- Jordan Feldstein – management
- Pete Giberga – A&R
- Beka Tischker – A&R
- Joe Jones – assistant engineer
- Rachel Santesso – choir director
- Brian Manning – booking
- Mitch Rose – booking
- Jo Ratcliffe – art direction, artwork
- Sean Sullivan – photography

== Chart ==
Weekly chart performance for Rabbits on the Run
Chart (2011)	Peak position
US Billboard 200	62

== Release history ==
Region	Date	Format(s)	Label
United States	July 26, 2011	CD; Digital download; Vinyl	Razor & Tie
