= White Houses (Vanessa Carlton song) =

Single by Vanessa Carlton

from the album Harmonium
- Released: August 30, 2004
- Length: 3:44
- Label: A&M
- Songwriters: Vanessa Carlton, Stephan Jenkins
- Producer: Stephan Jenkins

Vanessa Carlton singles chronology
| "Pretty Baby" (2002) | "White Houses" (2004) | "Private Radio" (2004) |

"White Houses" is a song written by American singer-songwriter Vanessa Carlton and Stephan Jenkins (lead singer of Third Eye Blind), and recorded for Carlton's second studio album Harmonium (2004). Produced by Jenkins, it was released as the album's first single in 2004.

== Production and composition ==
"White Houses" is structured around a 4/4 time signature which Blender magazine has described as "bright" and "un-girly", and is backed by an orchestral arrangement that PopMatters magazine said "would make Jim Steinman blush". Carlton said of the song: "It's about jealousy, it's about losing your virginity, it's about living on your own. It's a story that most people can relate to ... It's really the journey of one girl and her perception of her environment and how she starts out as a wide-eyed person, but everyone gets hardened by life, but not necessarily to the point where you can't feel anymore." She has also said it is about "rites of passage." "White Houses" was the first song Carlton and Jenkins wrote together, and Lindsey Buckingham of the band Fleetwood Mac played acoustic guitar on the track after Jenkins met Buckingham, who was recording in the same building as Carlton, and invited him to listen to the song. Carlton said, "he just came in, played this great riff, recorded it and then he left. It all happened very fast, and turned out amazing." The song provided the inspiration for a charity project, Building White Houses. It began on November 9, 2004 and ended on December 31, 2005. Its aim was to raise money for Habitat for Humanity International.

== Critical reception ==
Rolling Stone compared the song to Carlton's debut single "A Thousand Miles" from 2002, defining "White Houses" as "another spazzy, arpeggiated single ... which is not about the real White House but does kind of conjure the Bush twins jamming in a drop-top". A critic for Billboard said of the song: "it bears the do-it-my-way signature of a singer/songwriter who relies on piano; a meandering, storytelling lyrical style; and deceptively sweet vocals that underlie an intellectual bent ... The result is a highly original composition that makes you really want to listen and understand — and then sing along." PopMatters magazine presented a much more negative summary of the song, by saying that it "basically sums up everything that's wrong with Harmonium: An overly familiar vocal melody, juvenile "Dear Diary" lyrics (with lots of references to 'boys' plus a cringe-worthy reference to John Steinbeck) ... And a bombastic backing arrangement." Billboard critic Jonathon Newan describes White Houses as "beautifully humble and amazingly crafted. The in-depth lyrics which almost any nomad can relate to on a person level gives it an extraordinary inner-meaning, and the spectacular background arrangement is something that most pop songs lack. It's profound. It should be Carlton's next hit."

== Commercial performance ==
The single reached number 86 on the U.S. Billboard Hot 100, though it peaked within the top 40 on Billboard's Top 40 Mainstream and Adult Top 40 charts. Slant magazine named it the sixth best single of 2004, writing: "[it's] the kind of song that truly cements a career ... poignant, bloody, fleeting, and beautiful, much like adolescence". Blender magazine ranked "White Houses" at number 43 on its "100 Best Songs of 2004" list. The song failed to chart in Japan, and in Taiwan, "Private Radio" was the album's first single. This remains Carlton's last appearance on the Hot 100 to date.

== Live performances ==
Anti-folk singer Kimya Dawson performed a cover of "White Houses" during a live concert at Falmouth, Maine in May 2005. Carlton had previously contributed backing vocals to a track on Dawson's 2004 album Hidden Vagenda.

== Controversy ==
Carlton appeared to world-premiere the video on MTV's Total Request Live in the U.S. on August 11, 2004, and it debuted on VH1 on August 26. MTV, VH1 and some radio stations censored the song because of its lyrics. Carlton later described the situation as "just, you know, frustrating sometimes because they can pick and choose, which I don't think is fair if you want to make a statement." She attributed the censoring of the song to the Super Bowl XXXVIII halftime show controversy involving Janet Jackson, which had occurred earlier that year.

== Personnel ==
- Lead vocals by Vanessa Carlton
- Backing vocals by Vanessa Carlton and Stephan Jenkins
- Mixed by Mark "Spike" Stent at Olympic Studio, London, UK
- Piano by Vanessa Carlton
- Bass by Arion Salazar
- Acoustic guitar by Lindsey Buckingham
- Electric guitar by Arion Salazar and Jesse Tobias
- Drums by Abe Laboriel Jr.
- Strings arranged and conducted by Ron Fair
- Percussion by Stephan Jenkins

== Music video ==
The music video was directed by Sophie Muller and features Carlton singing and playing piano in a large room, while a second Carlton dances around the room. Carlton drew on her past experience as a ballet dancer for the performance.

== Track listings ==
- Japanese 5" CD single
1. "White Houses"
2. "C'est la Vie" (live)
3. "Papa" (live)

== Charts ==
| Chart (2004) | Peak position |
|---|---|
| Canada CHR/Pop Top 30 (Radio & Records) | 30 |
| Canada Hot AC Top 30 (Radio & Records) | 18 |
| US Billboard Hot 100 | 86 |
| US Adult Pop Airplay (Billboard) | 27 |
| US Pop Airplay (Billboard) | 25 |
