= Tristen Gaspadarek =

American singer-songwriter and musician (born 1983)

Tristen
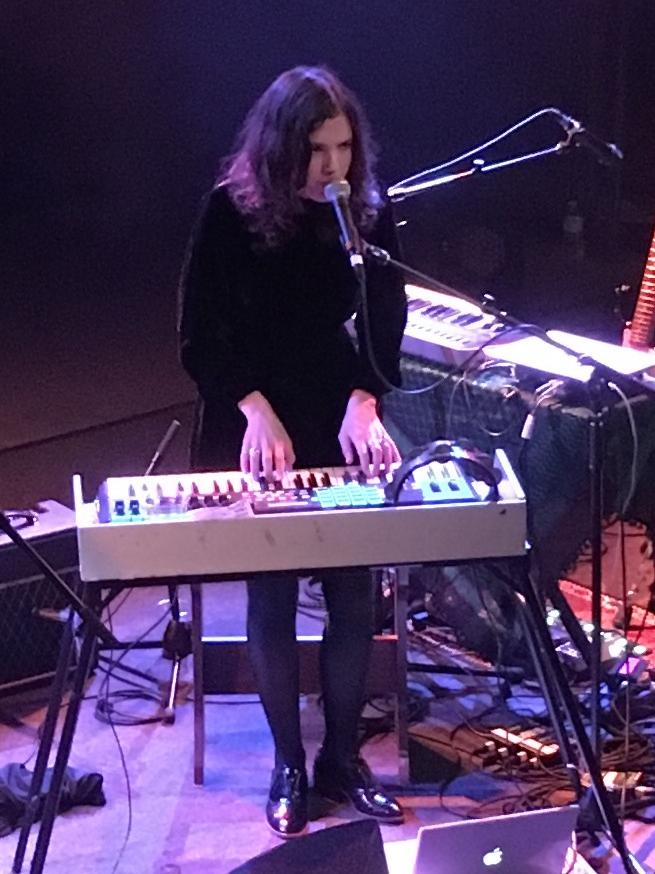
- Tristen performing in Cambridge, Massachusetts in March 2017

Background information
- Born: Tristen Gaspadarek; November 23, 1983 (age 42); Lansing, Illinois, U.S.
- Genre: Pop
- Occupations: Singer-songwriter; musician
- Instruments: Vocals; guitar; keyboards
- Years active: 2000–present
- Labels: PUPsnake; Modern Outsider
- Website: tristen.com

Tristen (born Tristen Gaspadarek, November 23, 1982) is an American singer-songwriter and musician. She has released six albums: Teardrops and Lollipops (2008), Charlatans at the Garden Gate (2011), C A V E S (2013), Sneaker Waves (2017), Aquatic Flowers (2021), and Unpopular Music (2025). She also performed as a member of Jenny Lewis's live band in 2015.

== Biography ==
After graduating from De Paul University in 2007, where she studied relational group and organizational theories of communication, she moved to Nashville, Tennessee to immerse herself in its music scene.

Tristen's first EP was an independent release, a collection of lo-fi demos titled Teardrops and Lollipops that was completed in 2008. She recorded the homemade EP in her Nashville apartment, burning the CD's herself and packaging them in unique, hand-sewn felt sleeves to sell at her shows.

In February 2011 she released her label debut Charlatans at the Garden Gate, which Rolling Stone magazine praised for its "catchy refrains with multiple meanings," and "ear-tugging melodies with hidden hooks." They interpreted the album's sound as "vintage rockabilly and girl group pop" and called Tristen "an artist worth watching." Slant Magazine reviewed Charlatans at the Garden Gate, stating that "the basic mastery of these songs, the way they skip between styles and voices, while maintaining a strict level of lyrical and vocal quality, is a great accomplishment in itself, especially on a debut." The album was also recognized favorably by NPR, Spin Magazine, The A.V. Club, and Paste Magazine, among others.

Her follow-up, C A V E S, was released in October 2013. Stylistically the album differed from the prominent folk sound of Charlatans with the new addition of drum machines and synths. American Songwriter said Tristen had "evolved her sound ... cranking up the complexity, craft and drama; mixing futuristic moments with quirky lullabies and the same biting tongue, sacrificing folk references for ’80s touch points." It was recorded partly in Nashville by Battle Tapes Recording engineer Jeremy Ferguson, partly in Omaha, Nebraska by Mike Mogis (Bright Eyes, M Ward) and was mixed by synth-pop pioneer Stephen Hague (New Order, Pet Shop Boys). Just like her previous album, C A V E S was named "Best Local Album of 2013". by the Nashville Scene Critic's Poll and in the "Top 50 Albums of 2013" by American Songwriter. SPIN Magazine said the sound of C A V E S had recast the songwriter as "a synth pop siren."

Tristen's fourth album, Sneaker Waves, was released in July 2017. The title was taken from the name of a large, powerful coastal wave known to appear without warning, periodically sweeping innocent bystanders out to sea. Tristen said she found the phenomenon of the sneaker wave to feel like a metaphor for life and death and a suitable album title. In making the album, Tristen and her husband and collaborator Buddy Hughen decided to record at their home studio in Nashville, handling nearly everything but the rhythm section and orchestral accompaniment. The songs on Sneaker Waves were described by Charleston City Paper as showing "traces of twang but more often than not seem to take the ambitious arrangements on C A V E S and filter them through a rich, timeless blend of garage rock, atmospheric country, [and] '60s girl group flourishes." Sneaker Waves was well received by critics, described by Rolling Stone as having "Nilsson-worthy power balladry," while NPR's Ann Powers put it in her list of "Top 10 Underheard Albums Of 2017" and called it "bursting with great melodies and hooky arrangements that tickle the ear and won’t leave your brain alone."

Since the release of Charlatans at the Garden Gate Tristen has toured North America with artists including Those Darlins, The Elected, Justin Townes Earle, Ezra Furman and the Harpoons, and Vanessa Carlton. In March 2014, she opened for Television in Nashville.

In 2015, Tristen was featured in the documentary The Moment: Bonnaroo, about the music festival.

In 2016, Tristen released a chap book of poetry, Saturnine.

Tristen's fifth album, Aquatic Flowers, was released June 4, 2021, by Mama Bird Recording Co.

Tristen's sixth album, Unpopular Music, was released in 2025.

== Discography ==
=== Albums ===
Year	Title	Label	Tracks	Formats
2008	Teardrops and Lollipops	Self-release	9	CD, download
2011	Charlatans at the Garden Gate	American Myth Recordings	11	LP, CD, download
2013	C A V E S	PUPsnake Records	11	LP/clear vinyl, CD, download
2017	Sneaker Waves	Modern Outsider	11	LP clear vinyl, CD, download
2021	Aquatic Flowers	Mama Bird Recording Co.	11	LP/blue vinyl, CD, download
2025	Unpopular Music	PUPsnake Records/Well Kept Secret	10	LP, CD, download

=== EPs ===
Year	Title	Label	Tracks	Formats
2009	Deceivers Are Achievers	Self-release	5	CD
2010	Eager for Your Love	American Myth Recordings	3	7", download
2011	Tristen Decks the Halls	Self-release	3	7" red vinyl, download
2019	Tristen Decks the Halls (re-issue)	Self-release	3	7" pink vinyl
2019	Tristen Decks the Halls (with bonus tracks)	Self-release	6	Download
2025	Zenith	PUPsnake Records/Well Kept Secret	3	7", download

=== Singles ===
Year	Title	B-side/notes	Label	Formats	Album
2011	"Eager for Your Love"	"Baby Drugs"	American Myth Recordings	Download / streaming	Charlatans at the Garden Gate
2013	"No One's Gonna Know"		PUPsnake Records	Download / streaming	C A V E S
2013	"Gold Star"		PUPsnake Records	Download / streaming	C A V E S
2014	"Forever Yours"	Carl Perkins cover	PUPsnake Records	YouTube streaming	Non-album track
2014	"See No Evil"	Television cover	PUPsnake Records	YouTube streaming	Non-album track
2016	"In Winter Blues"		PUPsnake Records	Download / streaming	Non-album track
2017	"Peaceful Easy Feeling"	Eagles cover	Instant Records	Download / streaming	Non-album track
2017	"Got Some"	"Glass Jar" (feat. Jenny Lewis)	Modern Outsider	7" Ltd. Ed. / streaming	Sneaker Waves
2017	"Crying on Christmas Day"	Proceeds go to Doctors without borders	PUPsnake Records	Download / streaming	Non-album track
2019	"Dream Within a Dream"	"Red Lava"	This Man Records	7" / 7" Ltd. Ed. handmade cover / download / streaming	Non-album track
2019	"A Case of You"	Joni Mitchell cover	PUPsnake Records/Modern Outsider	Download/streaming	Non-album track
2020	"Can't Walk That Back"		Self-release	Download/streaming	Non-album track
2020	"Salty Tears"		Modern Outsider	Download/streaming	Non-album track
2020	"Just Like Heaven"	The Cure cover		Download/streaming	Non-album track
2021	"Cheatin"		American Myth Recordings	Download/streaming	Eager for Your Love EP
2021	"Complex"		Mama Bird Recording Co.	Download/streaming	Aquatic Flowers
2022	"Harold the King"		PUPsnake Records	Download/streaming	Non-album track
2022	"Dance Me to the End of Love"	Leonard Cohen cover	Mama Bird Recording Co.	Download/streaming	Non-album track
2023	"The Lee Shore"		Self-release	Download/streaming	Non-album track
2025	"Skin of Our Teeth"		PUPsnake Records/Well Kept Secret	Download/streaming	Unpopular Music

== Collaborations ==
Year	Main Artist	Album	Songs	Contribution
2009	The Non-Commissioned Officers	Make-out with Violence (OST)	"Radar Heart (Rody Please)"	Vocals
2010	Caitlin Rose	Own Side Now	"New York"	Writer, backing vocals
2011	Jonny Corndawg	Down on the Bikini Line	Various tracks	Performer
2012	Wanda Jackson	Unfinished Business	Tracks 4, 6 and 7	Backing vocals
2012	JEFF the Brotherhood	"Dark Energy" (single)	"Dark Energy"	Vocals
2015	Quichenight	Quichenight Presents... Quichebeat 2015 (feat. Tristen and John Hendrickson)	"There Is a Time"	Vocals
2015	Quichenight	War on Christmas EP	"Silent Night"	Vocals
2017	Steelism	ism	"Shake Your Heel"	Vocals
2017	All Them Witches	Sleeping Through the War	4 tracks	Vocals
2017	And the Relatives	Green Machinery	"Hammer Down" / "Siamese"	Vocals
2018	Kacey Musgraves	Restoration: Reimagining the Songs of Elton John and Bernie Taupin	"Roy Rogers"	Backing vocals
2020	Vanessa Carlton	Love Is an Art	Various tracks	Writer, backing vocals
2025	Phiz (duo with Cortney Tidwell)	"i lost my fkn mind" (single)	"i lost my fkn mind"/"If I Had Known"	Writer, vocals, performance
2026	Vanessa Carlton	Veils	Various tracks	Writer

== Videography ==
Year	Title	Director	Formats	Album
2009	Matchstick Murder	Jeff Wyatt Wilson	Vimeo/YouTube	Charlatans at the Garden Gate
2009	Baby Drugs! (Live Version)	Seth Pomeroy	Vimeo	Charlatans at the Garden Gate
2011	Baby Drugs	Justin Mitchell	Vimeo/YouTube	Charlatans at the Garden Gate
2013	No One's Gonna Know	Bernadine Shout & Danny Buday	YouTube	C A V E S
2014	Catalyst	Seth Pomeroy	Vimeo/YouTube/Vevo/iTunes	C A V E S
2014	Gold Star	Tristen	YouTube	C A V E S
2016	A Dream Within A Dream (Live)	Tristen	YouTube	Saturnine (poetry book)
2016	Eight People on a Golf Course and One Bird of Freedom Flying Over	Bekah Cope	YouTube	Audio Poem by Lawrence Ferlinghetti (1988)
2017	Glass Jar (Feat. Jenny Lewis)	Casey Pierce	Vevo/YouTube	Sneaker Waves
2017	Got Some	Tristen	YouTube	Sneaker Waves
2018	Partyin' is Such Sweet Sorrow	Tristen + Seth Pomeroy	YouTube	Sneaker Waves
2019	Dream Within A Dream	Tristen/Shane Tutmarc	YouTube	Non-album single
2021	Complex	Tristen	YouTube	Aquatic Flowers
2021	Matchstick Murder (Live from the 5 Spot)	Anniversary Show	YouTube	Charlatans at the Garden Gate
2021	Athena	Tristen	YouTube	Aquatic Flowers
2021	Wrong With You	Joshua Shoemaker	YouTube	Aquatic Flowers
2021	Cool Blue	Jimmy Teru Murakami	YouTube	Aquatic Flowers
2021	Complex (Live at Tight Squeeze)	Tristen	YouTube	Aquatic Flowers
2022	Dance Me to the End of Love	Tristen	YouTube	Non-album single
2025	New Punching Bag	Jimmy Teru Murakami	YouTube	Zenith EP

== Film and television ==
Song	Program	Format	Episode
Baby Drugs	Better Living Through Chemistry	Film	
Baby Drugs	After Everything	Film	
Doomsday	Five Star Day	Film	
Baby Drugs	Enlightened	Television	S1:E4
Baby Drugs	Teen Mom 2	Television	S3:E12
Matchstick Murder	The Office	Television	
Special Kind of Fear	Sex & Drugs & Rock & Roll	Television	S1:E8
Catalyst	Neighbours	Television	7242–7265
Catalyst	Home and Away	Television	6131–6150
Easy Out	Home and Away	Television	6091–6110
Gold Star	Teen Mom 2	Television	S5:E10
Gold Star	Catfish: The TV Show	Television	S3:E6
Gold Star	Home and Away	Television	6131–6150
House of War	Finding Carter	Television	S2:E7
House of War	Home and Away	Television	6111–6130
Monster	Home and Away	Television	6091–6130
No One's Gonna Know	Home and Away	Television	6091–6130
Glass Jar	SEAL Team	Television	
Glass Jar	Miracle Workers	Television	S1:E4

== Books ==
Year	Title	Edition	Foreword By	Publisher
2016	Saturnine	Pocket Poetry Series: Volume One (2 pressings)	Ezra Furman	Cosmic Thug Records & Press
