= Love Is an Art =

Love Is An Art

Studio album by Vanessa Carlton
- Released: March 27, 2020
- Studio: Tarbox Road (Cassadaga, New York)
- Length: 36:06
- Label: Dine Alone
- Producer: Dave Fridmann

Vanessa Carlton chronology
| Liberman (2015) | Love Is An Art (2020) | Veils (2026) |

Singles from Love Is an Art
- 1. "Only Way to Love" Released: February 13, 2020; 2. "Miner's Canary" Released: February 21, 2020

Love Is an Art is the sixth studio album by American singer-songwriter Vanessa Carlton, released in the US on March 27, 2020, through Dine Alone Records. It is the follow-up to Carlton's previous studio album Liberman (2015) and marks her second studio album release since signing with Dine Alone Records.

== Background and writing ==
After touring together for Carlton's 2015 album, Liberman, Carlton and Tristen Gaspadarek began co-writing songs for Love Is an Art in Nashville in 2018. The two were neighbors in East Nashville and met up to write three days a week in three-hour sessions. Carlton noted she'd never done co-writing and "this back-and-forth with a partner. It was so cool, because when you work with great artists, they become kind of mirrors. So you are really forced to expose more of yourself and bring a lot more to the table than you maybe would have asked of yourself if you were working by yourself." The album delves into "human attachments and the relationship with the inner self." The songs touched on issues of toxic relationships, motherhood, and love.

Carlton noted Erich Fromm's The Art of Loving for its "exploration of love" and Michael Pollan's How to Change Your Mind as sources of inspiration for the album. She also noted songs by Ralph Vaughan Williams, Vashti Bunyan, Les Paul and Mary Ford, Philip Glass, Bill Withers, Jóhann Jóhannsson, Mercury Rev, The Stranglers, and PJ Harvey as inspiration.

Carlton emailed unsolicited demos to Dave Fridmann, a producer known for his work with Sleater-Kinney, The Flaming Lips, and MGMT.

== Critical reception ==
Professional ratings
Review scores
| Source | Rating |
|---|---|
| AllMusic | 3.5/5 stars |
| Pitchfork | 7.0 |
| American Songwriter | 3.5 |
| Riff Magazine | Positive |
| Marie Claire | Positive |

Love Is an Art received largely positive reviews from music critics. Pete Tosiello of Pitchfork wrote, "while she’s scaled back on her meticulous string arrangements, she fills her songs with winding asides and interludes, confessionals which build to rapturous climaxes and end with stray bars or abandoned verses." American Songwriter noted that Carlton, "exhibits more experimental and retrospective songwriting on the record, one that offers an escape into dream pop and otherwise lulling music." Stephen Thomas Erlewine for AllMusic wrote, "Her songs are insinuating, not grabbing, slowly revealing their contours through the delicately interlocked keyboards. It may take time for the songs to reveal themselves, but many build to a cathartic crescendo, like the cascade of volume that closes "Future Pain" or the pulse that pushes "The Only Way to Love" to its conclusion."

== Track listing ==
Adapted from AllMusic and the album's liner notes.

| No. | Title | Writer(s) | Producer(s) | Length |
|---|---|---|---|---|
| 1. | "I Can't Stay the Same" | Vanessa Carlton; Tristen Gaspadarek | Fridmann | 3:43 |
| 2. | "Companion Star" | Carlton; Gaspadarek | Fridmann | 2:43 |
| 3. | "I Know You Don't Mean It" | Carlton; Gaspaderek | Fridmann | 4:27 |
| 4. | "Die, Dinosaur" | Carlton; Gaspaderek | Fridmann | 3:04 |
| 5. | "Love Is an Art" | Carlton; Gaspaderek | Fridmann | 4:06 |
| 6. | "Future Pain" | Carlton; Gaspaderek | Fridmann | 3:05 |
| 7. | "Back to Life" | Carlton; Gaspaderek | Fridmann | 2:32 |
| 8. | "Patience" | Carlton; Gaspaderek | Fridmann | 1:16 |
| 9. | "The Only Way to Love" | Carlton; Gaspaderek | Fridmann | 4:08 |
| 10. | "Salesman" | Carlton; Gaspaderek | Fridmann | 3:54 |
| 11. | "Miner's Canary" | Carlton; Gaspadarek | Fridmann | 3:08 |
| Total length: | | | | 36:06 |

Deluxe edition bonus tracks
| No. | Title | Writer(s) | Length |
|---|---|---|---|
| 12. | "Break to Save" | Gaspadarek; Carlton | 4:00 |
| 13. | "I Know You Don't Mean It (Demo)" | Gaspadarek; Carlton | 4:01 |

== Personnel ==
Credits adapted from AllMusic

Musicians

- Vanessa Carlton – piano, vocals, Wurlitzer, Rhodes piano, oscillator
- Tristen Gaspadarek – vocals
- Dave Fridmann – Bass, drum programming, drums, horn arrangements, keyboards, organ, programming, synthesizer, synthesizer bass
- John J. McCauley III – guitar
- Adam Landry – acoustic guitar
- Patrick Hallahan – drums, percussion, tympanon
- Skye Steele – keyboards, synthesizer, violin
- Olivia Davie – french horn
- Dan Infranco – french horn
- Jon Fridmann – trombone
- Chris Ryan – cello

Technical

- Dave Fridmann – mixing, producer, engineer
- John Baldwin – mastering
- Rishon Blumberg – A&R
- Alysse Gafkjen – photography
- Berke Yazicioglu – design
- Jo Ratcliffe – illustration

== Charts ==
Weekly chart performance for Love Is an Art
| Chart (2020) | Peak position |
|---|---|
| US Top Current Album Sales (Billboard) | 76 |

== Release history ==
List of release dates, showing region, format(s), label and reference
| Region | Date | Format(s) | Label | Ref. |
|---|---|---|---|---|
| United States | March 27, 2020 | CD; digital download; vinyl | Dine Alone Records | |
| United States | March 27, 2022 | vinyl | Dine Alone Records | |
