= Harmonium (Vanessa Carlton album) =

Studio album by Vanessa Carlton
- Released: November 9, 2004
- Recorded: July 2003 – July 2004
- Studios: Skywalker Sound, CA; The Record Plant, Hollywood, CA; Mourningwood Studio, South Park, SF
- Genre: Pop rock
- Length: 43:15
- Label: A&M
- Producer: Stephan Jenkins

Vanessa Carlton chronology
Be Not Nobody (2002)	Harmonium (2004)	Heroes & Thieves (2007)

Singles from Harmonium
- 1. "White Houses" Released: August 30, 2004

Harmonium is the second studio album by American pop singer-songwriter Vanessa Carlton, released by A&M Records in the US on November 9, 2004. Carlton co-wrote some of the album with Stephan Jenkins, her then-boyfriend and the lead singer of Third Eye Blind, who produced the album. Harmonium debuted outside the top 20 on the US Billboard 200, and sales fell considerably short of those of Carlton's debut album, Be Not Nobody (2002). Its only single in the US, "White Houses", was not a top 40 hit; two other singles, "Private Radio" and "Who's to Say", were released only in Asia. The album was less commercially successful than its predecessor, which Carlton attributed to poor promotion, and led to her departure from A&M Records in mid-2005. She toured through the US during 2004 and '05 in support of the album.

== Background ==
=== Writing ===
Carlton and Jenkins met and began a relationship in mid-2002, when she and rock band Third Eye Blind, of which Jenkins is lead singer, were on tour together. After seeing Carlton perform live, Jenkins entered her dressing room and expressed interest in producing her music, and according to Carlton they "decided very quickly, that we had the same vision for the album". By January 2003, Carlton had written ten songs that she intended to include on the album. "You record more, you write more. I never put a stop to my writing process," she said. Recording of the album was originally scheduled to begin with producer Daniel Lanois after the conclusion of Carlton's 2003 European concert tour, which ended in February, and she wanted Jason Falkner and Nigel Godrich to co-produce the album; she said she believed collaborators would enable her to introduce into her music "tastes and sensibilities" to which she wouldn't normally be open. She originally envisioned the album as a "solo girl" version of The Beatles' Sgt. Pepper's Lonely Hearts Club Band, explaining that it would involve choruses, flutes and trumpets, "and it's just real", she said. She also mentioned her desire "to establish my place with an album that's undeniably me".

Interscope Records chairman Jimmy Iovine suggested that Carlton co-write with Jenkins after Carlton played the album's first five songs for him. Carlton said she felt trepidation about collaborating with Jenkins and that there were "moments when things got intense" between them, but because they had similar intentions for the album and Jenkins "deferred" to and was "sensitive" to her style of piano-playing and the direction in which she wanted to take the album, she "trusted him completely" and called it "a cool collaboration". Carlton credited Jenkins with helping her to withstand and protect herself from pressures the record label executives, who wanted to influence the recording process, placed on her.

=== Recording ===
Carlton began recording the album in June 2003 at Morningwood Studios (owned by Jenkins) in San Francisco, before moving to filmmaker George Lucas's Skywalker Ranch in Marin County, California. During recording, Carlton cited Jeff Buckley, PJ Harvey as additional influences on the album: "Sonically I'd like to use the same approach ... If you're going to hear strings, you're going to hear them squeak," she explained. She experimented with sounds reminiscent of the music of The Cure. Before recording began, Carlton and Jenkins conducted a series of "A-B-ing" tests to compare analog tape with Pro Tools (digital). Because they could not tell the difference, they used a mixing board that Carlton said was "similar to what a lot of the old [Led] Zeppelin tracks were mixed on, so basically we were able to get a very warm, easy-to-listen-to mix where it didn't come across as 'icy' sounding". Several instruments were tracked using analog tape, but Pro Tools was used for most of them. According to Carlton, Jenkins was "generous" with his knowledge as a producer and taught Carlton about the recording studio, helping her to "realize the way the song is enveloped is sometimes more important than the song in some ways." Carlton wrote each song with arrangements in mind and played it on the piano for Jenkins, who joined in on drums, and they began devising the arrangements. Recording was completed at The Record Plant in Los Angeles because, as Carlton put it, "When you're in the middle of a bunch of cows, the pace of things tends to slow down." The album, which took a year to record, was mixed at Olympic Studio in London, at Waystation Studio in Beverly Hills, California, and at South Beach Studios in Miami Beach, Florida by mixers including Mark "Spike" Stent and Tom Lord Alge. According to Carlton, her label "wasn't very happy" about the decisions she made during the making of the album.

Jenkins also played instruments and performed programming and mixing work on the album, and he recorded backing vocals with Carlton on several songs, including "She Floats", in which their vocals were edited to make it sound as if a forty-member choir were singing. "White Houses" was the first song Carlton and Jenkins wrote together, and Lindsey Buckingham of the band Fleetwood Mac played acoustic guitar on the track after Jenkins met Buckingham, who was recording in the same building (The Record Plant, Los Angeles), and invited him to listen to the song. Carlton said the process of Buckingham writing and recording the riff "happened very fast, and turned out amazing". Several other guest musicians worked on the album. Pharrell of the production duo The Neptunes, who were working with Good Charlotte, contributed backing vocals to "Who's to Say". Two of the three drummers on the album were Abe Laboriel Jr., who played on Be Not Nobody, and Bryan "Brain" Mantia ("She Floats"), formerly of the band Primus. Third Eye Blind guitarists Tony Fredianelli ("San Francisco") and Arion Salazar also appear, as does former Red Hot Chili Peppers member Jesse Tobias. Carlton said she wanted to record a duet with Fleetwood Mac lead singer Stevie Nicks but never got the chance; they did, however, collaborate on a song on Carlton's third album, Heroes & Thieves (2007). She said "there was nothing calculated about the collaborations [on the album], nothing corporate". A documentary, Pleased to Meet You, highlighted the process of recording the album and is included on an enhanced CD. Carlton said she thought it would "shed a lot of light the direction that I am going in and where I come from", mentioning that its working title was Pleased to Meet You: Vanessa Carlton, the New American Goth.

== Composition ==
Carlton said the album includes darker themes than those present on Be Not Nobody. She said she was past the "diary stage" of songwriting, in which "you're kind of mostly narcissistic and dealing with yourself", and that as one grows up they "start to absorb [the] environment in a different way"; she called the album a reflection of a "different" and "more womanly" perspective of the world, as opposed to the "innocent and girlish" quality of Be Not Nobody. However, she has said that although "things get a bit heavier as you get older", she still has a "lightness of youth" and is "able to be as girlie in ways that I should be." She referred to the album as "bittersweet" rather than "just bitter" and stressed the importance of the lyrics on Harmonium compared to those on Be Not Nobody, which she said was focused more on the music: "I want the lyric to resonate as much as the chord underneath it," she said. She said that instead of an album with "one-two punch songs", she wanted to make an album that engaged people to the point that they want to listen to it repeatedly, and that they would learn something new each time. "[T]hose are the kind of albums I love and that I'll listen to for years and I'll want to listen to every single song on it," she said.

An October 2003 article in Rolling Stone magazine reported that "Private Radio" would likely be the album's lead single, and "San Francisco" the only love song. Carlton was quoted as saying there was "nothing piano recital-y" about the album, which she called "goth ... The Wicca in me has come out ... I've been able to kind of just merge the Wicca and the Eighties chick." This provoked a skeptical response from MetaFilter users, one of whom wrote "this girl needs to buy a clue." Carlton later wrote on her official internet messageboard that the article misrepresented what she was trying to say, and that her fans should ignore what is written in the press about the album until they own it.

"White Houses" describes a young woman coming of age and finding romance, and eventually losing her virginity; "I wanted to write a song that everyone could relate to, about situations that everyone faces." "Annie" is a song Carlton wrote after she met a girl suffering from leukemia while on tour. According to Carlton, "Private Radio" is "a jammin booty rockin' song" about insomnia. She had suffered from the condition for several years, but in October 2004, she said she "sleep[s] like a baby." She said "She Floats" contains "creepy sounding strings" and is about "the kind of the euphoria that someone gets when they're tortured by being dead". She has named "Who's to Say" as "one of the songs on the album I'm most proud of". She dedicated it to "anyone in a relationship that's unapproved of by their mother or government". She said she liked performing the song and that audiences at her shows connected with it. Carlton has named "Afterglow" as a favorite of hers on the album; it is about "letting go anchors of pain". "Papa", a solo vocal-and-piano piece, is not about her own father but a "different kind of daddy". The Fender Rhodes-driven "C'est la Vie" is an "angry" song and the only one on the album not to include the piano, and Carlton has said it is about the single time she was "dumped" and her inability to speak French; she said that to her, the phrase c'est la vie meant "f[uck] it", and that it helped her overcome emotional pain during the breakup. She wrote "San Francisco" in the city. "Half a Week Before the Winter" is a Goth-influenced "dark song" that Carlton intended as a metaphor for Charles Darwin's theory and the concept of "survival of the fittest": "Those beautiful animals [unicorns] again could be a symbol for so many things, they die and they shouldn't and I think it's also part my take on the music industry and how so many beautiful things that you do get eaten by the Vampires". Carlton stated in one of her concerts that "She Floats" is about a ghost in her closet, the screaming in the song is her and her producer, Stephan Jenkins screaming. "The Wreckage", the album's closing hidden track, is about Carlton's boredom while driving and her desire to start car accidents.

She said "Morning Sting", a song that was dropped from the album, is about "emotions being so raw in the morning". She excluded it from the album because although she did not feel like it was "crappy", she wanted Harmonium to contain a certain number of songs. The album shares its name with a keyboard instrument, the harmonium, but Carlton said she adopted the word and made her own definition for it; she intended it as a portmanteau of the words harmony and pandemonium to define the approach to the recording of the album, which she described as "kind of an organized, chaotic approach where I wanted to maintain and preserve that wild abandon to creating." Carlton considered working with Be Not Nobody producer and A&M Records president Ron Fair on the album but decided not to do so, although Fair is credited as the album's co-executive producer. She said that much of Fair's "own aesthetic [and] tastes" were present in the arrangements of the songs on Be Not Nobody, in contrast to Harmonium, where "the dominant taste and aesthetic is my own". She cited the influence of live performances on Harmonium, as opposed to the "studio gloss" present on Be Not Nobody, in creating a feeling that is "a little bit rougher around the edges and a bit more comfortable in a raw form"; according to her, the tracks on Harmonium feature a lot of breathing space so that listeners don't feel there is "a million things going on... There's nothing going on that shouldn't be", and consequently, it is very "easy on the ears", organic and simple. Ron Fair himself contrasted the two albums, comparing the "more formal" Be Not Nobody to "Carlton in an elegant party dress" and Harmonium to "her in Birkenstocks and jeans". According to Carlton, because she had more knowledge of the process of recording an album and elements such as arrangements, she had more creative control over Harmonium than Be Not Nobody. She called the album "so much more sonically personal to me" and "my taste exactly. It's exactly how I would arrange everything, as opposed to someone coming in and just dressing up the songs that I wrote."

== Release ==
=== Singles ===
White Houses served as the album's lead, and only US single. Released on August 30, 2004, the single failed to meet the success her previous singles had. In the US, the single charted on the Billboard Hot 100 at #86, becoming her lowest peaking single to date. It is also her last single to chart on the Billboard Hot 100. "White Houses" became the subject of a prank that Ashton Kutcher pulled on Carlton for the MTV television show Punk'd. During Carlton's rehearsal for a scheduled performance on The Tonight Show in November 2004, Kutcher's Punk'd crewmembers (disguised as staff from The Tonight Show) said Carlton needed to change both the bridge of the song and the line "I'm too thin" (in light of the publicity surrounding Mary-Kate Olsen's bout of anorexia nervosa). Upon realization that it was a trick, Carlton told Kutcher, "All I have to say is 'thank the fucking Lord.'" (She performed the original version of the song on The Tonight Show on November 18, 2004, and the Punk'd episode was aired in May 2005.)

The second single from the album was Private Radio. The single, only released in areas in Asia, performed poorly due to lack of promotion. Who's To Say was the third and final single, also released exclusively in Asia. The singles have been recognized mainly as promotional singles, and not official singles released from the album.

== Critical reception ==
Professional ratings
Aggregate scores
Source	Rating
Metacritic	54/100
Review scores
Source	Rating
AllMusic	3/5 stars
Blender	3/5 stars
E!	B
Entertainment Weekly	B−
Mojo	2/5 stars
PopMatters	5/10
Rolling Stone	2/5 stars
Slant Magazine	4/5 stars
Stylus	C
USA Today	3/4 stars

Harmonium received mixed to positive reviews from critics. Slant Magazine stated, "From the rollicking piano arpeggios to the classically-influenced melodies, it's impossible not to invoke Tori Amos when discussing Carlton's songwriting, particularly in the last stretch of the album. And where Amos loses herself in abstract loopiness, Carlton often gets caught up in pretty but ambiguous metaphors (see the dreamlike imagery of unicorns and vampires in "Half A Week Before The Winter" and the "dandelions blowing in the wind" of the orchestral "She Floats"). But it just so happens that these are some of the most musically interesting songs on the album, the latter climaxing with a spectacular choir of voices and screams that wouldn't sound out of place on Björk's Medúlla. And while there may not be as many immediate hooks as there were on her debut, she does deliver a bit of pop perfection on the stylish 'Afterglow' and the slick 'Private Radio', which unleashes one soaring hook after another. It's intelligent ear candy for those who don't mind a sugar rush." Elysa Gardner of USA Today also praised the album, commenting, "Carlton's second CD is that rare coming-of-age project that feels neither corny nor calculated. Enlisting Third Eye Blind frontman Stephan Jenkins as producer and sometime co-writer, the 24-year-old unveils songs that seem sharper and more intimate than those on her debut, yet still retain sweetness. The single, 'White Houses', and 'Who's to Say' capture the dewy wonder and confusion of young love, while 'Private Radio' and 'Half a Week Before the Winter' reject navel-gazing in favor of a crisply moody intensity. Few artists of Carlton's generation could make growing pains sound this convincing or endearing." Steven Erlewine from Allmusic also gave the album a good review, stating "Carlton's songs often read like diary entries, dealing with familiar adolescent themes as love and longing, and they sound even smaller when delivered in her thin but appealing girlish voice, but they gain stature when married to their cinematic arrangements, driven by her insistent, circular piano and dressed by light layers of strings, guitars, and vocal overdubs. Where her debut, Be Not Nobody, could sound endearingly awkward, Harmonium is confident and somber, a conscious attempt to be serious and mature that nevertheless still sounds adolescent, largely due to her earnest lyrics and overly ambitious music. Carlton seems to equate seriousness with a lack of hooks, either in the music or the production, so there's nothing as immediate or memorable as 'A Thousand Miles', which means there's nothing to lead a listener into the world she sketches on the album—only those already won over by the entirety of her debut will have the patience to dig deeply into this insular album. That's not to say that this is a difficult album, or even a challenging one—it's merely a transitional one, with some good ideas and some good songs that don't quite gel as a full record, even if Jenkins gives the album a cohesive sound. Ultimately, Carlton is so intent on being serious, so intent on crafting her songs and sound, that she winds up with an album that's admirable but for its intent, but not its achievement."

However, many critics had mixed feelings about the album. Stylus Magazine reviewed the album, saying "The first half of the record is primarily a happy ordeal. 'Annie', a song about a fan dying of an unnamed disease, even reaches ecstatic moments via its energetic backing track of Carlton's Glassian circular piano loops and verses that reveals that, yes, indeed Stephen Jenkins (Third Eye Blind, boyfriend) is the co-producer of this record. By which it's meant to say that they plod in a very enjoyable way. The clincher of this side of the record, however, is 'San Francisco' which sees Carlton revealing that she's attained her 'utopia' and that it's a 'we're' instead of 'I'm' that's back in the city. Even the saddest moment, musically, on the first side reveals Carlton as finally 'free' to do as she pleases, with the 'wind at her back'. It's on this second side, where things get interesting, that the major problem with the album begins to cut into the enjoyment of the disc however. Carlton's lyrics, as noted above, tend to veer towards the diary entry style that has come to define many of her contemporaries. Unfortunately, this doesn't help in cases where less is more—as on the aforementioned 'Papa' and 'The Wreckage'. It's only when Carlton wordlessly moans in 'The Wreckage' that the horror of which she speaks comes out. Needless to say, the last verse is an extraneous recapitulation, which could have been better served as a fade-out."

== Chart performance ==
Harmonium debuted at #33 on the US Billboard 200 with 36,000 copies sold in its first week, before falling out of the top 40 in its second. By the end of 2004 it had sold less than 108,000 copies in the US, and it remained on the chart for just seven non-consecutive weeks. According to Nielsen SoundScan in February 2006, the album had sold 179,000 copies, an amount that compared unfavorably with the platinum sales of Carlton's debut album Be Not Nobody, which reached the top five in the US. Explaining Carlton's "predictable plunge" with Harmonium, the New York Daily News indicated the release date was partially responsible for the album's underperformance, and emphasized the low radio play for "White Houses": "Every holiday season, some acts wind up with nothing but a lump of coal... more importantly, radio found no hits on Carlton's sophomore CD". Slant magazine, also attributing the album's low sales to the failure of "White Houses", alleged a lack of promotion by A&M Records: "Whether ["White Houses"] wasn't promoted adequately or audiences just didn't connect with the more mature, narrative style of the song, the label decided to let the album languish on store shelves with little support". The album was released on October 21 in Japan, and peaked at #52 on the Oricon album chart, where Be Not Nobody had reached the top 20; it stayed on the chart for six weeks. In Taiwan, the album debuted at #10 on the international albums chart the same week that "Private Radio", which was released as a single there, reached the top ten on the singles chart.

== Promotion ==
Ron Fair noted that the approach taken to marketing Carlton was different from those for other pop singers such as Lindsay Lohan, Hilary Duff and Ashlee Simpson, who he described as "prominent media and television stars [whose] music is an extension of their overall image", as opposed to Carlton, who he called "a singer/songwriter in the classic sense". He cited the significance of the success of "A Thousand Miles" (2002), Carlton's debut single, in determining how to promote the album. Chris Richards, a Borders music buyer, said that a follow-up record from an artist who had a "huge" hit debut single was a "challenge", but that the album "retains the same qualities of the first. She is one of the pure-hearted girls, very squeaky clean and parent-approved". MTV News wrote that because she was no longer grouped with fellow young female singer-songwriter-instrumentalists Avril Lavigne and Michelle Branch, Carlton had a challenge "to balance her artistic credibility with a fanbase built upon TRL appeal." Carlton described herself as alternative to the popular mainstream hip hop and pop artists, such as Jessica Simpson and her sister, Ashlee. According to Ron Fair, a key element in the promotion of the album was radio airplay for "White Houses", which was released to radio in late August 2004. Its airplay slowly increased afterwards, and it did not enter the U.S. Billboard Hot 100 until October, peaking at 86 in early November. In early October, Carlton opened for alternative rock band The Calling on their short tour of Brazil, and a performance she recorded for Sessions@AOL was aired over the Internet. Later that month, Carlton travelled to Japan to promote the album there.

To support the album, Carlton embarked on a North American concert tour, which began on October 21 in Minneapolis, Minnesota and concluded on November 21 in Portland, Oregon; her opening act was pop rock band Low Millions. She said the tour would be "just me and the piano" and "totally stripped down, like an in-your-living room-type of feeling, that type of intimacy." She recorded a cover of the Kai Winding song "Time Is on My Side" (1963) for a Time Warner digital video recorders commercial, which also served as promotion for Harmonium and received heavy rotation on U.S. television during early 2005. The newspaper Metroland wrote, "we tend to think time is most definitely not on her side — how else to explain the near-universal apathy to the release of [Harmonium]?" Harmonium was not re-issued to include the song. Carlton was quoted in a March 2005 interview with Fly Magazine as saying it was "difficult" for someone like her, a singer-songwriter who played the piano, to "reach a lot of people", but that "depending on what happens with the second single, I think it will do really well. I hope the record goes gold and all those things." A second tour, with Cary Brothers and Ari Hest as support acts for many of the shows, ran from March 9 (in Atlanta, Georgia) to April 30 (in Plattsburgh, New York). In April and May 2005, songs from Harmonium were featured on the WB teen soap operas Charmed and One Tree Hill, and Carlton participated in an exclusive performance with Ryan Cabrera.

During summer 2005, Carlton supported rock singer Stevie Nicks on her Gold Dust U.S. tour. Nicks said she was glad to give Carlton the opportunity to perform in front of a large, caring and loving audience, particularly because the poor state of the music industry meant that artists such as her weren't "nurtured ... I really respect her. I'll be damned if I'll let her go by the wayside. She is one of the great ones. She won't quit." In October Carlton embarked on solo dates in the U.S., including one at Dartmouth College, where The Dartmouth wrote that Carlton "sought sympathy not only as the girl suffering in her song but also as the artist disappointed with her apparent lack of popularity." Carlton rejoined Nicks on her ten-date tour of Australia and New Zealand in February and March 2006. Carlton said she was suffering from the lack of promotion the label gave to the album because of her non-conformist attitude, but that she felt she made the right decision with regards to gaining press attention and credibility that she wanted to maintain throughout her career so she could attract loyal fans. "That's really important to me," she said.

== Controversies and censorship ==
MTV censored, and later banned, the single's music video because of a lyric in the song that refers to sexual intercourse. Carlton said it was hypocritical for MTV because "All that is on MTV is sex. They are selling it all the time with sexy hip-hop videos with girls in their bras and panties doing their booty dance. But an eloquent statement about it from a female point of view..." After the conclusion of the Harmonium tour, A&M Records sent Carlton into the recording studio because they didn't feel that there was a potential follow-up single on the album. During her studio time, in which she wrote songs with Linda Perry and The Matrix, she had what she called a "revelation" about leaving the label to find another record deal.

In May, Carlton wrote to her fans on her official website that because "shortsighted (nonmusical bastards)" at the label did not believe the album would sell well if given promotion, there would be no second single released in the US. "[I] worked my ass off promoting Harmonium in the ways that [I] could control, but you can't sell records to someone in the middle of Indiana without a little help," she wrote. By the following month, Carlton had separated from A&M Records. Carlton explained the situation in an interview with Express in 2007:

Actually, I was given an ultimatum – basically like a slap on the wrist, like, "You shouldn't have made Harmonium; you should have done everything we said." Meanwhile, it wasn't supported by them, so of course I was doomed to begin with on that project. They pulled the plug on my record and then said, "See, it didn't work. You have to now reaudition [and] submit your songs as you write them. You have to do everything that we say." So what's the point of having an aesthetic and being an artist if you're just some kind of puppet for a team of people that don't necessarily know their own aesthetic? There was no other choice for me but to leave.

Weeks before the announcement, PopMatters magazine wrote, "One has to wonder how long it will be before we hear the inevitable "the industry ate me up" stories from Vanessa Carlton. Perhaps when this record fails to outsell her debut and A&M drops her?" The Herald & Review said that Carlton "[became] another one of the new millennium's poster children for what happens when music labels are taken over by accountants and artist development is abandoned."

== Track listing ==
Standard edition

1. "White Houses" (Vanessa Carlton, Stephan Jenkins) – 3:45
2. "Who's to Say" (Carlton, Jenkins) – 4:51
3. "Annie" (Carlton, Jenkins) – 4:48
4. "San Francisco" (Carlton) – 4:12
5. "Afterglow" (Carlton) – 3:56
6. "Private Radio" (Carlton, Jenkins) – 2:59
7. "Half a Week Before the Winter" (Carlton) – 3:27
8. "C'est La Vie" (Carlton) – 2:34
9. "Papa" (Carlton) – 2:39
10. "She Floats" (Carlton) – 5:00
11. "Where the Streets Have No Name" (Bono, U2) – 5:37 (bonus track for Japan, UK, 2023 digital reissue, and 2025 LP release)
12. "The Wreckage" (Carlton) (hidden track) – 2:17

DVD (Japan)

1. Pleased to Meet You – 24:42
2. "White Houses" (dance rehearsal) – 3:34
3. Duet – 1:24
4. Extended footage – 8:19

== Personnel ==
- Vanessa Carlton – vocals, backing vocals (tracks 1–4, 8), piano (tracks 1–7, 9–11), keyboards (tracks 3, 7), Fender Rhodes (track 8), choir (track 10)
- Stephan Jenkins – backing vocals (tracks 1–4, 8), percussion (tracks 1–2, 5), organ, electric guitar (track 4), programming, keyboards (track 6), drums (tracks 7–8, 10), mixing (tracks 9–10), choir (track 10)
- Mark "Spike" Stent (Olympic Studio, London) – mixing (tracks 1–2, 6)
- Arion Salazar – bass guitar (tracks 1–6, 8, 10), electric guitar (tracks 1–2, 6)
- Lindsey Buckingham – acoustic guitar (track 1)
- Jesse Tobias – electric guitar (tracks 1, 4–6), additional electric guitar (track 2), guitar (track 3, 10), mandolin (track 5)
- Abe Laboriel Jr. – drums (tracks 1–6)
- Ron Fair – string arranger and conductor (tracks 1–2, 4–6, 10)
- Pharrell – backing vocals (track 2)
- Louis Conte – percussion (track 2)
- Dave Way (Waystation Studio, Beverly Hills, California) – mixing (track 4)
- Lior Goldenberg – mixing assistant (track 4)
- Tony Fredianelli – electric guitar (track 4)
- Tom Lord Alge (South Beach Studios, Miami Beach, Florida) – mixing (tracks 5, 7)
- Fernio Hernandez – mixing assistant (tracks 5, 7)
- Sean Beresford – programming (track 6), mixing (track 11)
- Jerry Hey – trumpet (track 7)
- Gayle Levant – harp (track 7)
- Jason Carmer – mixing (track 8)
- Jun Ishizeki – mixing (tracks 9–10)
- Brain – drums (track 10)
- Endre Granat, Bruce Dukov, Natalie Leggett, Charlie Bisharat, Jackie Brand, Julie Gigante, Robin Olson, Mario DeLeon, Alan Grunfeld, Josefina Vergara, Roberto Cani, Phillip Levy, Songa Lee, Sara Parkins, Lily Ho Chen, Sid Page, Tammy Hatwan, Armen Garabedian, Sarah Thornblade, Berj Garabedian, Anatoly Rosinsky, Eun-Mee Ahn, Tiffany Hue, Joel Derouin, Franklyn D'Antonio – violin
- Brian Dembow, Simon Oswell, Vicki Miskolczy, Marlow Fisher, Sam Formicola, Danny Seidenberg, Matt Funes, Roland Kato, Kazi Pitelka – viola
- Steve Erdody, David Low, Cecilia Tsan, Larry Corbett, Suzie Katayama, Armen Ksajikian – cello
- Nico Abondolo, Mike Valerio, Oscar Hidalgo – additional bass
- Gerry Rotella – flute
- Tom Boyd – oboe
- Emily Bernstein – clarinet
- Producer: Stephan Jenkins
- Executive producers: Vanessa Carlton, Ron Fair
- Engineer: Sean Beresford
- Additional engineering: Jun Ishizeki, Lior Goldenberg, Tony Espinoza
- Strings recording: Frank Wolf, Tal Herzberg
- A&R: Ron Fair
- Assistant engineers: Judy Kirschner, Dann Thompson (Skywalker Sound); Jun Ishizeki (The Record Plant); Scott Brannan (Mourningwood Studio)
- Art direction: Vanessa Carlton, Drew FitzGerald
- Illustrations: Drew FitzGerald
- Font designer: Vanessa Carlton
- Hair: Sarra 'Na
- Makeup: Heather Currie
- Styling: Arianna Tunney, Alyssa Leal
- Photography: Sheryl Nields
- Management: Arthur Spivak, Stuart Sobol, Deborah Klein
- Legal representation: Tim Mandelbaum

== Charts ==
=== Weekly charts ===
Weekly chart performance for Harmonium
Chart (2004)	Peak position
Japanese Albums (Oricon)	52
US Billboard 200	33
Canadian Album Charts (Nielsen BDS)	53
