= Vanessa Carlton =

American singer-songwriter and pianist (born 1980)

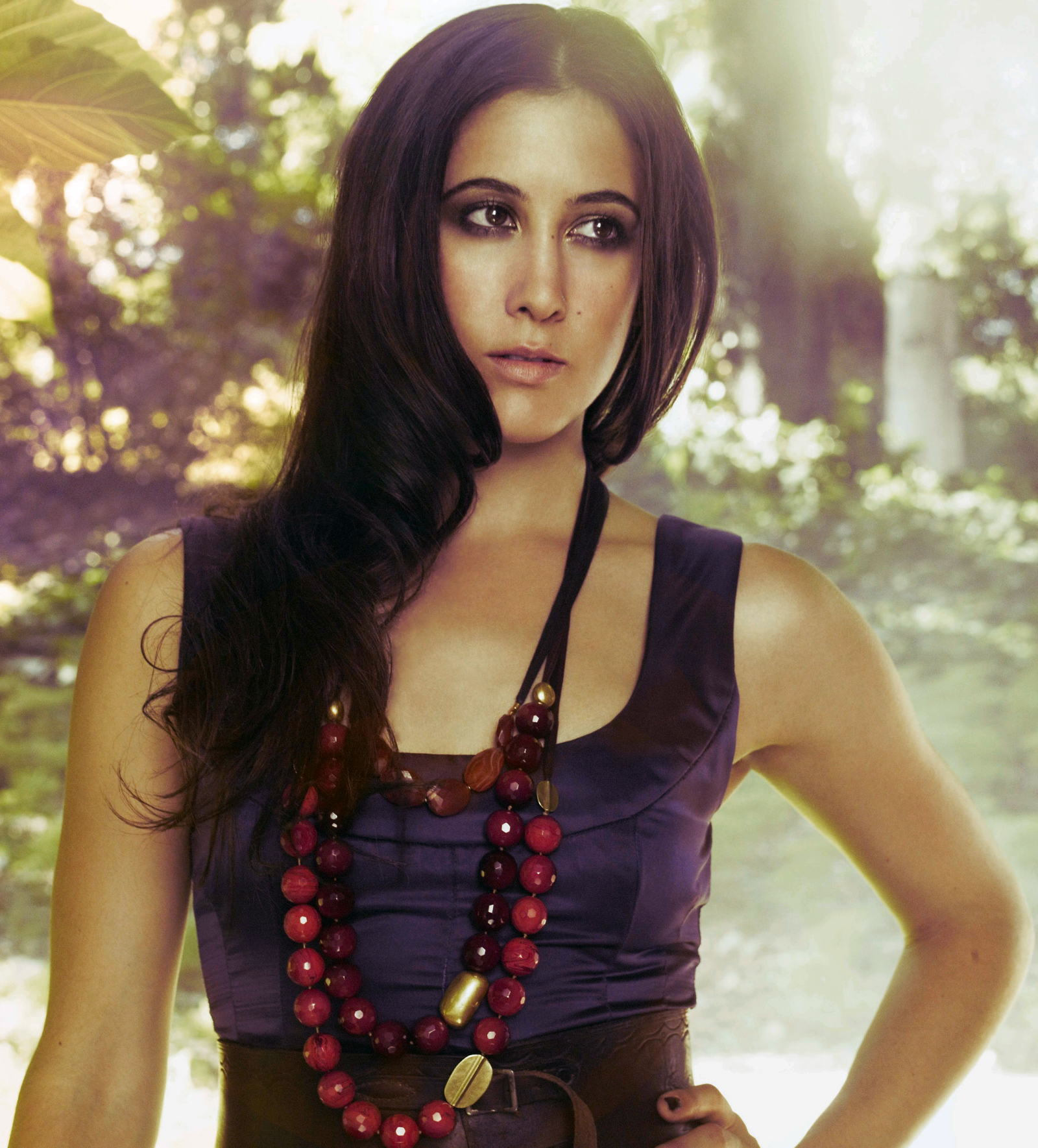
- Carlton in 2010
- Born: Vanessa Lee Carlton; August 16, 1980 (age 46); Milford, Pennsylvania, U.S.
- Education: School of American Ballet
- Occupations: Singer-songwriter; pianist; actress
- Years active: 2000–present
- Spouse: John Joseph McCauley (m. 2013)
- Children: 1
- Musical career
- Genres: Pop; rock
- Instruments: Vocals; piano
- Works: Discography
- Labels: Liberman; Dine Alone; A&M; The Inc.; Razor & Tie; Victor Music
- Website: vanessacarlton.com

Vanessa Lee Carlton (born August 16, 1980) is an American singer-songwriter, pianist, and actress. Her 2002 debut single "A Thousand Miles" spent 41 weeks on the U.S. Billboard Hot 100 and earned three Grammy Award nominations, becoming her signature song. It preceded her debut studio album, Be Not Nobody, released by A&M Records that same year and reaching No. 5 on the Billboard 200. It further produced the singles "Ordinary Day" and "Pretty Baby". Her next studio album, Harmonium (2004), experienced similar success; its troubled production led Carlton to depart A&M in 2005.

Carlton released her third studio album, Heroes & Thieves (2007) on The Inc. Records, to minimal chart success but critical praise. She independently released her next two studio albums, Rabbits on the Run (2011) and Liberman (2015), both of which were acclaimed for its personal subject matter and musical shift. Her sixth studio album, Love Is an Art, was released in 2020. In 2025, Billboard ranked Carlton among the best female artists of the 21st century. She released her most recent studio album, Veils, in 2026.

Outside of music, Carlton made her Broadway debut with a leading role in the jukebox musical Beautiful: The Carole King Musical (2019).

== Early life ==
Vanessa Lee Carlton was born on August 16, 1980, in Milford, Pennsylvania, the first of three children of Edmund "Ed" Carlton, a business jet pilot, and Heidi Lee, a pianist and school music teacher, who taught Carlton how to play piano from a very young age. She has a sister, Gwen, and a brother, Edmund.

Carlton's mother comes from a Jewish family in Queens, New York City. Her maternal grandfather's last name was "Liberman" but he changed it to "Lee" after World War II due to antisemitism. He worked as a painter and shopkeeper in New York; Carlton later named an album and her record label after her grandfather.

Her interest in music began at an early age. At the age of 2, she visited Disneyland, and played "It's a Small World" on the piano when she came home.

At the age of 9, Carlton became obsessed with dance. At 13, she began to study ballet under Gelsey Kirkland and Madame Nenette Charisse in New York City. In 1994, at age 14, she enrolled at the School of American Ballet. Carlton sought solace from her intense ballet training by songwriting, often writing songs on a piano in a dormitory kitchen. In the 9th grade, she became good friends with future actress and director Julia Stiles, a classmate.

When she was 16 or 17, she started recording demos of her songs. She did not get along with one of her ballet teachers and would skip class to write music on the piano in her dormitory.

In 1997 or 1998, at her parents' house in Philadelphia, Carlton came up with the piano riff that eventually became part of "A Thousand Miles". Her mother told her that the song would be a hit, but she was not able to finish writing it at that time. She finished the song over a weekend after a challenge. The song is about an unnamed student at Juilliard School, a now famous actor, on whom Carlton had a crush.

Around that time, Carlton's father, a business jet pilot, gave Carlton's demo recordings to his clients; one of such tapes was passed on to Turkish-American businessman Ahmet Ertegun, a co-founder of Atlantic Records. Ertegun then became a mentor to Carlton, although the rest of the Atlantic Records' team was not interested in signing her.

Her early demo tape was posted to YouTube in 2008.

She graduated from the School of American Ballet in 1998. She then became a waitress in Hell's Kitchen, Manhattan, while performing at small venues. At age 18 or 19, she signed her first recording contract with a music publisher.

== Career ==
=== 2001–2003: Be Not Nobody ===
In 2001, Carlton met songwriter and record producer Peter Zizzo at an event by the New York Songwriters Circle at A Bitter End in New York City and was invited to his studio to record a demo. Zizzo introduced Carlton to record executive Jimmy Iovine, who saw one of her shows and signed her to A&M Records.

After hearing Carlton's demo of "A Thousand Miles", A&M Records president Ron Fair organized recording sessions and produced and arranged the song.

Carlton worked on songs for a studio album to be called Rinse; however, the album was never released, as Fair said that it "wasn't up to her potential", instead opting to take "an extra year and start from scratch". Many of the songs were reworked and included on Be Not Nobody (2002). "Carnival", was re-recorded as "Dark Carnival" for the vehicular combat video game SpyHunter 2 (2003).

The song "A Thousand Miles" became a hit, peaking in the top five on the Billboard Hot 100, and went on to become the sixth-most-played song of the year. At the 45th Annual Grammy Awards it was nominated for "Record of the Year", "Song of the Year", and "Best Instrumental Arrangement Accompanying Vocalist(s)."

The studio album Be Not Nobody was released in April 2002 and reached No. 5 on the Billboard 200 albums chart with 102,000 units sold in its first week. It sold more than 1.4 million copies worldwide. The album also included singles "Ordinary Day" and "Pretty Baby".

In the summer of 2002, Carlton was the opening act for the rock bands Goo Goo Dolls and Third Eye Blind. She headlined a tour at the fall of 2002 and toured Europe in January and February 2003.

In 2002, Carlton provided the descant vocals for the Counting Crows cover version of the 1970 song "Big Yellow Taxi", originally by Joni Mitchell.

Carlton enrolled at Columbia University in the fall of 2003, where she intended to study English language. However, she ended up dropping out after a couple of semesters.

=== 2004–2005: Harmonium ===
Carlton played the piano on the song "Indaco dagli occhi del cielo" (cover version of "Everybody's Got to Learn Sometime"), by Italian singer Zucchero Fornaciari, with Haylie Ecker of Bond on violin, released in August 2004.

"White Houses", released to radio in late August 2004, peaked at No. 86 on the Billboard Hot 100. MTV censored and later banned the music video because of a controversial lyric in the song, "You were my first time", that likely refers to losing one's virginity.

Carlton provided backing vocals for "Moving On" by Kimya Dawson of the Moldy Peaches for her fourth solo studio album Hidden Vagenda, released in October 2004.

Carlton's second studio album, Harmonium, was released in November 2004. Harmonium debuted at No. 33 on the Billboard 200 and descended quickly after, selling fewer than 150,000 copies by February 2006, which was considered a disappointment after her successful debut. The album was produced by Stephan Jenkins, the frontman of Third Eye Blind, and included darker themes than those on her debut studio album. Carlton and Jenkins had met on tour and begun a relationship in mid-2002.

Carlton credited Jenkins with helping her to withstand pressure from record label executives who wanted to influence the recording. The label then let the album languish on store shelves with little support.

Carlton embarked on a four-week North American concert tour in October and November 2004, with an opening act of Low Millions. She performed a second tour in March and April 2005, with Cary Brothers and Ari Hest as opening acts.

Carlton wrote 3 songs with American-British songwriting and record production team the Matrix in January 2005: "It's Now", "Summer Child" (also titled "Tuesday"), and "Underneath".

Around 2005, Carlton met Stevie Nicks of Fleetwood Mac at the Record Plant recording studio and they established a friendship.

Carlton left A&M Records in mid-2005, once promotion for Harmonium had ended, saying that " there was pressure from the record label to be a certain type of artist" and that she "would make a (lousy) pop star".

=== 2006–2008: Heroes & Thieves ===
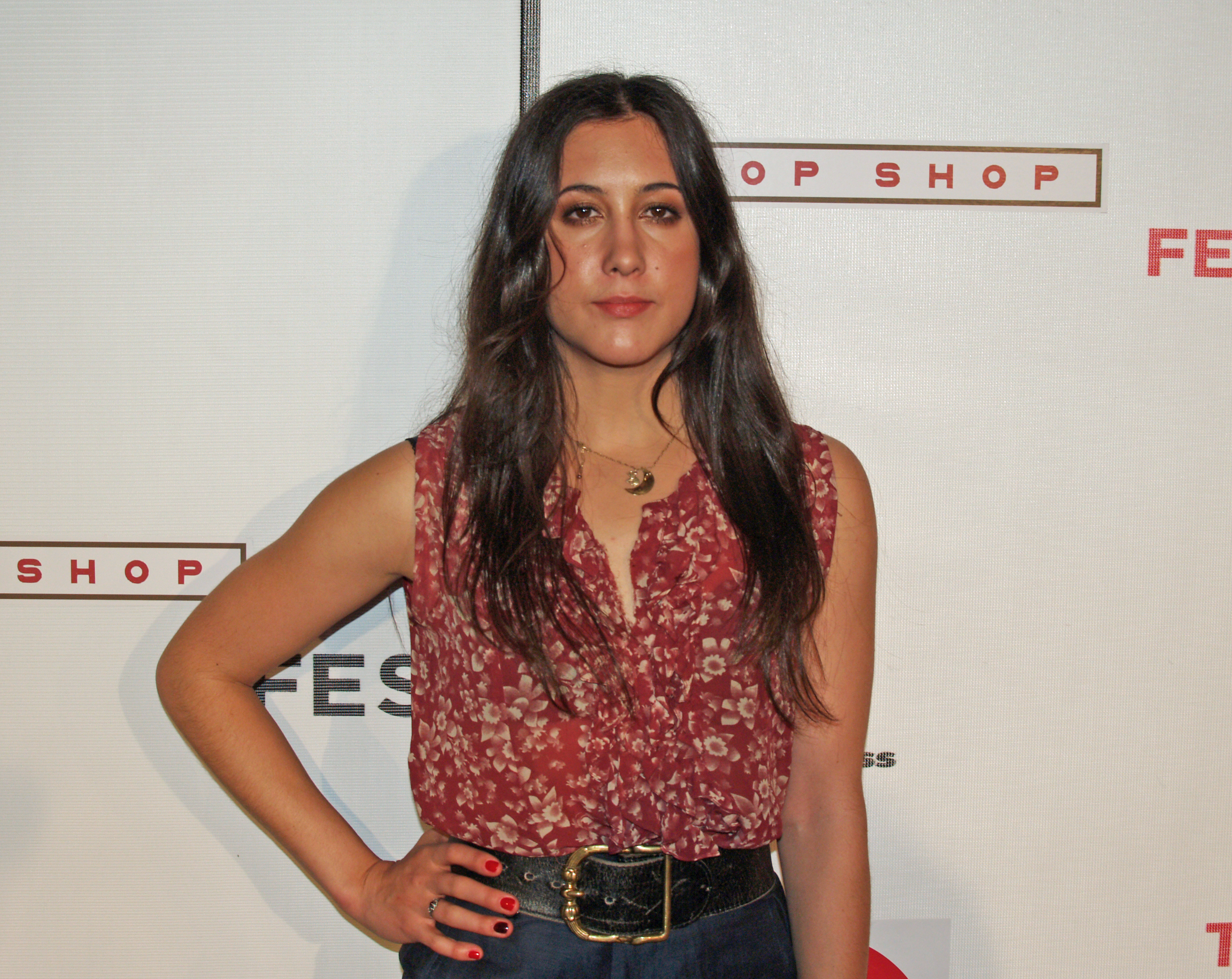
Carlton at the Tribeca Film Festival in New York City, 2008

Carlton's third studio album, Heroes & Thieves was released in October 2007 and was influenced by her breakup with its co-producer, Stephan Jenkins, although they remained friends and worked together on the album. The album debuted at No. 44 on the U.S. Billboard 200. "Nolita Fairytale" was the first single and peaked at No. 26 on Billboard's Adult Top 40 Tracks chart.

To promote the album, Carlton embarked on the Haunted Club Tour in November 2007.

In November 2006, Carlton signed to Irv Gotti's hip-hop label The Inc. Records; they parted ways once her promotional commitments to Heroes & Thieves had passed.

=== 2009–2012: Rabbits on the Run and Hear the Bells ===
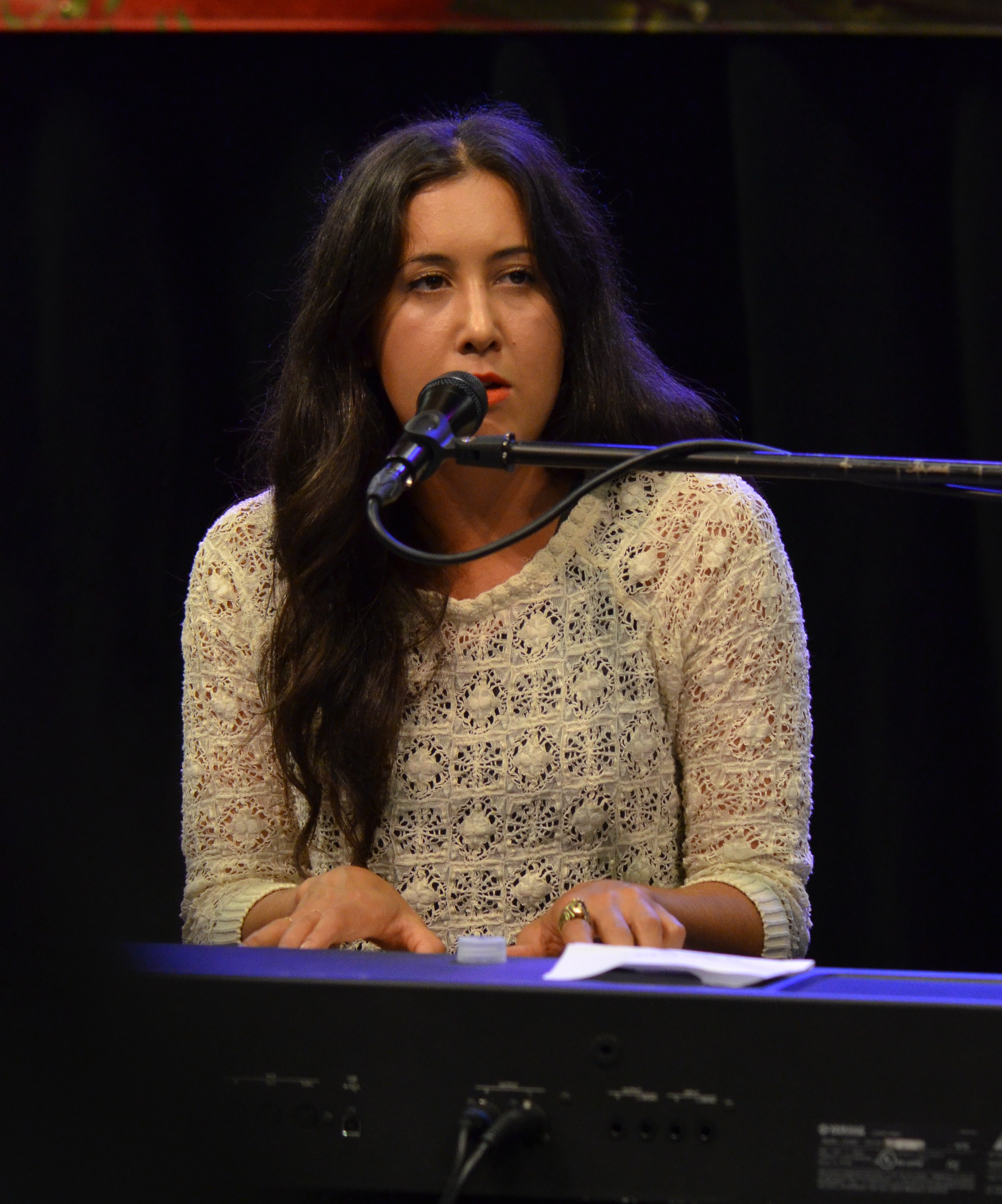
Carlton performing live at Best Buy in 2011

Carlton's fourth studio album Rabbits on the Run was released in July 2011, under Razor & Tie, her third record label, and received praise from music critics who particularly noted its "strikingly personal" subject material.

Before recording the album, Carlton was unsure whether she wanted to make another record or pursue film scoring instead. She chose to record at Real World Studios, a Georgian mill that was converted by Peter Gabriel in Box, Wiltshire, England. She chose the title for the symbolism often depicted by rabbits—'time slipping, mind floating'. The album was further inspired by Stephen Hawking's A Brief History of Time (1988) and Richard Adams's Watership Down (1972). The dreamy, fantastical sound of the album was achieved by recording direct to tape and was produced by Steve Osborne.

The Hear the Bells extended play (EP), released in November 2011, consists of four "holiday themed" tracks, including acoustic versions of Carlton's songs "Hear the Bells" and "A Thousand Miles".

=== 2012–2016: Liberman and Blue Pool ===
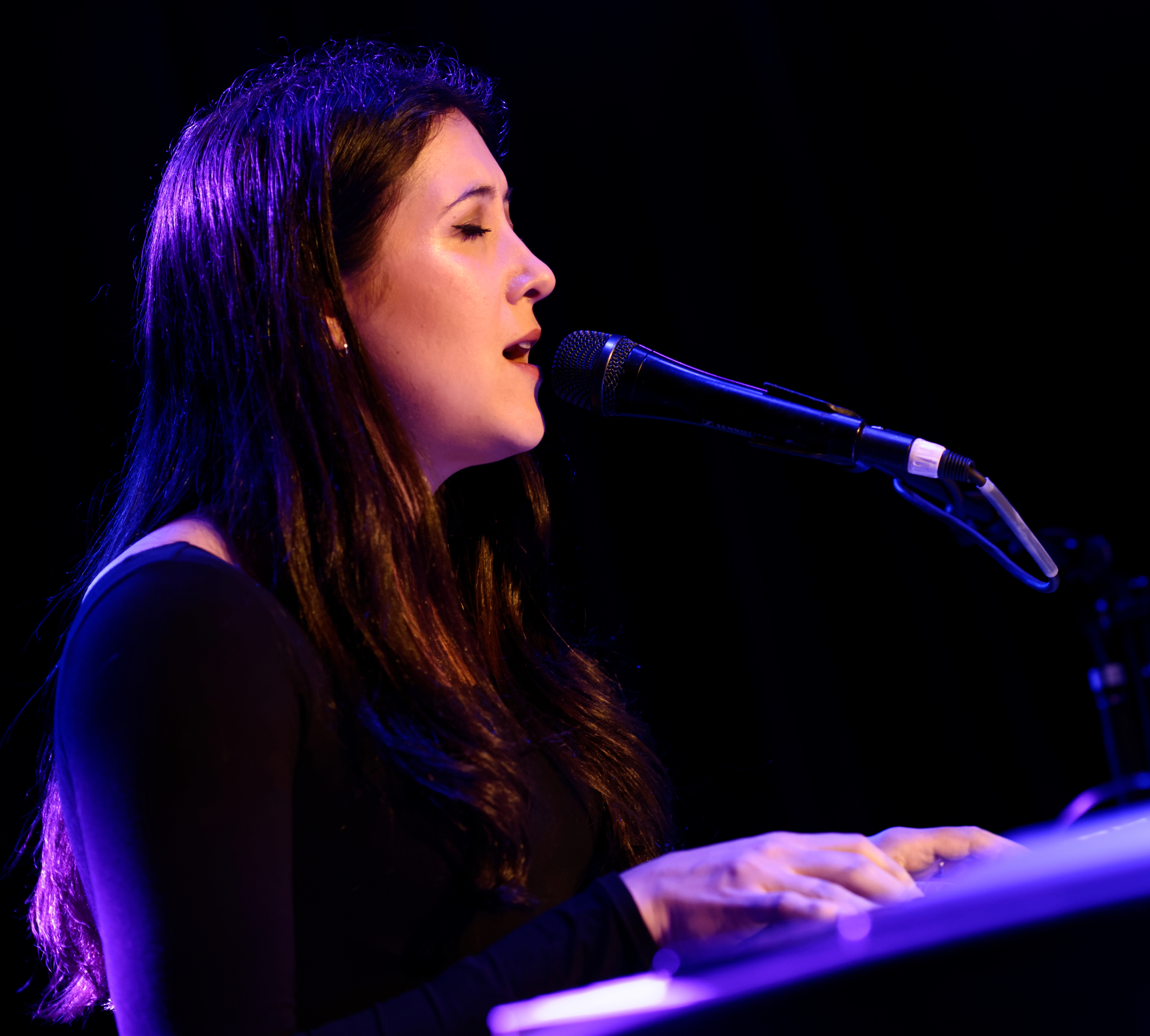
Carlton performing live at the Roxy Theatre in West Hollywood, California, 2016

In February 2014, Carlton finished recording the ten-track album, titled Liberman, inspired by a painting by her grandfather, and in April 2014, the album was mastered. However, release of the album was delayed to 2015 due to her pregnancy.

In an interview with CBS News published in June 2014, Carlton described the album as "kind of lush, trippy and beautiful" and a "rabbit hole of sounds."

In April 2015, Carlton signed a recording contract with Dine Alone Records.

In June 2015, Carlton released the song "Blue Pool" through Nylon. The song was included on the Blue Pool EP, released digitally in July 2015. The songs on the EP were part of a deluxe version of the Liberman album.

"Willows" was released in August 2015.

Liberman was finally released in October 2015 on Dine Alone. Liberman was positively received, and like its preceding studio album, was also praised for touching on personal subjects for Carlton. Ken Capobianco of The Boston Globe wrote that the material "finds her a long way from 'A Thousand Miles' – and in a better place, artistically." Matthew Schnipper of Pitchfork wrote that "Carlton's voice is the key attraction on songs [from Liberman] that register between low-key pop, rock, and folk."

Carlton released Liberman Live in October 2016. The album features 8 live tracks recorded at a show in Nashville, Tennessee. The album was her manager's idea.

=== 2017–2020: Going independent, cover versions and Broadway debut ===
By 2017, Carlton "felt stifled by her major labels" and became an independent artist.

In February 2017, Carlton released Earlier Things Live, a live album, via her own Victor Music label. It included six songs from albums that were released pre-Liberman and were played live throughout 2015 and 2016 on the Liberman tour.

In March 2017, rapper Cam'ron sampled "A Thousand Miles" for a hip-hop song; Carlton enjoyed the song.

In March 2018, she began to release one cover version per month. The first of six songs, a cover of "Call Your Girlfriend" by Robyn, was released digitally in March 2018. The second, a cover of Fleetwood Mac's "Dreams" was released in April 2018. The third, a cover of Neil Young's "Only Love Can Break Your Heart" was released in May 2018. The fourth cover, Fred Neil's "Little Bit of Rain" was released in June 2018. The fifth cover, "Needle in the Hay" by Elliott Smith, which she described as one of her favorite songs, was released in July 2018. The sixth and final cover song, "Lonely Girls" by Lucinda Williams was released in August 2018. She released the covers EP as a triple vinyl collection, along with the Liberman Live and Earlier Things Live EPs, in November 2018.

In June 2019, Carlton made her Broadway theatre debut with a lead role in the jukebox musical Beautiful: The Carole King Musical, performing for a limited season. Mark Kennedy of The Seattle Times believed that the role marked "another fascinating turn" in Carlton's career.

"Future Pain" was released in November 2019.

=== 2020–present: Love Is an Art and Veils ===
Carlton's sixth studio album Love Is an Art, written with her neighbor Tristen Gaspadarek, was released in March 2020.

In 2023, a video of a piano-playing robot puppet that looks like Carlton singing "A Thousand Miles" became a viral video. The puppeteer, Ben Howard, brought the puppet to one of Carlton's concerts.

In 2024, Carlton and her husband, John Joseph McCauley, created the film score for Wish You Were Here, which was directed by Carlton's longtime friend, actress Julia Stiles and released in January 2025.

In November 2025, she released "Animal", produced by Dave Fridmann, the first single from her next studio album.

Carlton's seventh studio album Veils was released in April 2026 via her own label, Liberman Records. That month, she was a surprise performer at Coachella.

== Personal life ==
=== Relationships and family ===
In 2002, Carlton dated singer John Mayer for less than a year.

From 2002 to 2007, Carlton dated Stephan Jenkins, the frontman of Third Eye Blind; they had met on tour. Their breakup was described as "heartwrenching".

In June 2010, Carlton came out as bisexual while performing at Nashville Pride.

Around 2012, Carlton was introduced to John Joseph McCauley, lead vocalist of Deer Tick, by Patrick Hallahan of My Morning Jacket. They got engaged and in October 2013, Carlton announced that they were expecting a child; however, the following month she experienced an ectopic pregnancy, including a ruptured fallopian tube and internal bleeding. She underwent emergency surgery to remove her right fallopian tube.

In December 2013, Carlton and McCauley married in a ceremony officiated by Stevie Nicks.

In June 2014, Carlton announced another pregnancy, and in January 2015, Carlton gave birth to their daughter, Sidney Aoibheann Carlton-McCauley.

Carlton owned a long-haired dachshund named Lord Victor.

=== Religion ===
Carlton identifies as Jewish.

=== Residences ===
In 2004, Carlton purchased a 2,500 square foot loft on Lafayette Street in SoHo, Manhattan for $1.83 million. In 2020, she listed it for rent for $15,500 per month.

In March 2014, Carlton purchased a house in Nashville, Tennessee, which she renovated and sold. She became friends with her neighbor, Tristen Gaspadarek, and they toured together and collaborated on songs.

In April 2021, during the COVID-19 pandemic, she purchased an early 1800s home in Pawtuxet Village in Warwick, Rhode Island via FaceTime without seeing it in person. She spent $110,000 to renovate its carriage house into a recording studio. Her home was featured in Architectural Digest in May 2022. In 2024, she sued her neighbors after dealing with years of noise from construction. She won the case; however, it was appealed to the Rhode Island Supreme Court in April 2026. In July 2026, the Rhode Island Supreme Court affirmed the lower court's decision and ruled in favor of Carlton.

=== Sports ===
In 2005, aged 25, Carlton completed the New York City Marathon in under 4 hours; she got into running 6 years earlier.

In May 2026, Carlton threw out the first pitch at a St. Louis Cardinals home game.

=== Illnesses ===
Carlton has experienced and spoken publicly about depression and bouts of bulimia.

=== Advocacy ===
Carlton has raised money for Musicians on Call, a charity that brings music to patients' bedsides at healthcare facilities.

In July 2008, Carlton contributed a stripped-down version of her song "More than This" to Songs for Tibet: The Art of Peace, an album compiled in support of human rights issues in Tibet.

In September 2008, Carlton and several other musicians embarked on a 9-day trip to the Arctic Circle, where they studied climate change alongside scientists on behalf of the charity Cape Farewell, UK.

In 2012, Carlton was named an ambassador to the Save the Music Foundation.

In 2014, Carlton performed at Rockaway Beach, Queens to support the Surfrider Foundation's Barefoot Wine Beach Project, which encouraged people to keep beaches clean.

In 2017, Carlton appeared in an ad for People for the Ethical Treatment of Animals (PETA), supporting neutering to address overpopulation of pets.

In January 2018, Carlton called for the ouster of Neil Portnow, chairman and CEO of The Recording Academy, after he made disparaging comments against women in the music industry.

On International Women's Day in March 2018, Carlton criticized singer Chris Brown for sharing her video on his Instagram page, noting that he has a history of violence against women.

In April 2020, during the COVID-19 pandemic, Carlton performed a concert at home to raise money for MusiCares.

Carlton, who suffered from an ectopic pregnancy, is a supporter of the abortion-rights movement.

Carlton has been a critic of Donald Trump. In February 2020, she endorsed Bernie Sanders before the 2020 Democratic Party presidential primaries. In October 2024, she endorsed Kamala Harris in the 2024 United States presidential election.

== Tours ==
=== Opening act ===
- Goo Goo Dolls and Third Eye Blind (2002)
- Stevie Nicks (2022)

=== Headliner ===
- Be Not Nobody Tour (2002–2003)
- Harmonium Tour (2004)
- Haunted Club Tour (2007)
- The Liberman Tour (2015–2016)
- Veils Tour (2026)

== Discography ==
Studio albums

- Be Not Nobody (2002)
- Harmonium (2004)
- Heroes & Thieves (2007)
- Rabbits on the Run (2011)
- Liberman (2015)
- Love Is an Art (2020)
- Veils (2026)

== See also ==
- List of awards and nominations received by Vanessa Carlton
