= Pretty Baby (Vanessa Carlton song) =

2002 single by Vanessa Carlton

Single by Vanessa Carlton

from the album Be Not Nobody
- B-side: "Swindler"
- Released: December 2, 2002
- Length: 3:55 (album version); 4:08 (single version)
- Label: A&M
- Songwriter: Vanessa Carlton
- Producer: Ron Fair

Vanessa Carlton singles chronology
"Big Yellow Taxi" (2002)	"Pretty Baby" (2002)	"White Houses" (2004)

"Pretty Baby" is a song by American singer-songwriter Vanessa Carlton from her debut studio album, Be Not Nobody (2002). The song was released as the third single from the album in on December 2, 2002, but did not experience prolonged chart success in the United States or abroad.

== Awards and accolades ==
"Pretty Baby" was nominated for Choice Love Song at the 2003 Teen Choice Awards but lost to "Crazy in Love" by Beyoncé and Jay-Z.

== Track listings ==
European CD single

1. "Pretty Baby"
2. "Swindler"

European maxi-CD single

1. "Pretty Baby"
2. "Swindler"
3. "Red Ditty"
4. "Pretty Baby" (enhanced video)

UK CD single

1. "Pretty Baby"
2. "Twilight" (live)
3. "A Thousand Miles" (live in New York)
4. "Pretty Baby" (director's cut video)

== Charts ==
=== Weekly charts ===
Chart (2003)	Peak position
Belgium (Ultratip Bubbling Under Flanders)	17
Netherlands (Dutch Top 40 Tipparade)	13
Netherlands (Single Top 100)	86
Switzerland (Schweizer Hitparade)	62
UK Singles (Official Charts)	94
US Bubbling Under Hot 100 (Billboard)	1
US Pop Airplay (Billboard)	21

=== Year-end charts ===
Chart (2003)	Position
US Mainstream Top 40 (Billboard)	91

== Release history ==
Region	Date	Format(s)	Label	Ref(s).
United States	December 2, 2002	Contemporary hit radio	A&M	
Australia	February 10, 2003	CD	A&M	
United Kingdom	February 24, 2003	CD; cassette	A&M	
