= Ordinary Day (Vanessa Carlton song) =

2002 single by Vanessa Carlton

Single by Vanessa Carlton

from the album Be Not Nobody
- B-side: "Paradise"
- Released: July 1, 2002
- Length: 3:58
- Label: A&M
- Songwriter: Vanessa Carlton
- Producer: Ron Fair

Vanessa Carlton singles chronology
| "A Thousand Miles" (2002) | "Ordinary Day" (2002) | "Big Yellow Taxi" (2002) |

"Ordinary Day" is a song written and performed by American singer-songwriter Vanessa Carlton from her debut studio album, Be Not Nobody (2002). Carlton wrote the song when she was 17 and was the first song that she had ever written in only one sitting. Released as a single on July 1, 2002, the song peaked at number 30 on the US Billboard Hot 100.

When Carlton performs the song live, she uses some of the original lyrics that she wrote for the song rather than the ones recorded for the album version. On the album, the lyrics at the end of the chorus are "Don't you see your dreams lie right in the palm of your hand?" and in the live version Carlton sings "If we walk now, we will divide and conquer this land".

== Music video ==
The video was directed by Marc Klasfeld, who also directed the music video for her previous hit single "A Thousand Miles". The video begins with Vanessa Carlton writing the song's title in a diary. As she starts to sing "just a boy, just an ordinary boy", a boy appears behind her. The video continues with her playing the piano and walking in a large field filled with people hugging and kissing each other under a solar eclipse.

== Track listings ==
US CD single

1. "Ordinary Day" (LP version)
2. "Paradise" (LP version)

Australian CD single

1. "Ordinary Day" (album version)
2. "A Thousand Miles" (live)
3. "Ordinary Day" (piano vocal)
4. "Ordinary Day" (video)

UK CD single

1. "Ordinary Day" (album version) – 3:58
2. "A Thousand Miles" (live) – 4:05
3. "Swindler" – 3:22
4. "Ordinary Day" (CD-ROM video)

European CD single

1. "Ordinary Day" (album version)
2. "A Thousand Miles" (live)

Japanese CD single

1. "Ordinary Day" (album version)
2. "A Thousand Miles" (live)
3. "Swindler"
4. "Paradise" (piano vocal)
5. "Ordinary Day" (piano vocal)
6. "A Thousand Miles" (piano vocal—live in Tokyo)

== Charts ==
=== Weekly charts ===
| Chart (2002–2003) | Peak position |
|---|---|
| Australia (ARIA) | 48 |
| Belgium (Ultratip Bubbling Under Flanders) | 5 |
| Belgium (Ultratip Bubbling Under Wallonia) | 8 |
| Canada CHR (Nielsen BDS) | 9 |
| Ireland (IRMA) | 41 |
| Netherlands (Dutch Top 40 Tipparade) | 7 |
| Netherlands (Single Top 100) | 73 |
| New Zealand (Recorded Music NZ) | 17 |
| Romania (Romanian Top 100) | 42 |
| Scotland Singles (Official Charts) | 51 |
| Switzerland (Schweizer Hitparade) | 64 |
| UK Singles (Official Charts) | 53 |
| US Billboard Hot 100 | 30 |
| US Adult Pop Airplay (Billboard) | 29 |
| US Pop Airplay (Billboard) | 9 |

=== Year-end charts ===
| Chart (2002) | Position |
|---|---|
| US Mainstream Top 40 (Billboard) | 44 |

== Release history ==
| Region | Date | Format(s) | Label | Ref. |
|---|---|---|---|---|
| United States | July 1, 2002 | Contemporary hit radio | A&M | |
| Australia | September 23, 2002 | CD | A&M | |
| Japan | September 25, 2002 | CD | A&M | |
| United Kingdom | November 18, 2002 | CD; cassette | A&M | |
