= Be Not Nobody =

Studio album by Vanessa Carlton
- Released: April 30, 2002
- Studio: IGA Studios (Santa Monica); Henson Studios (Hollywood); Royaltone Studios (Burbank)
- Genre: Pop; pop rock
- Length: 45:57
- Label: A&M
- Producer: Ron Fair

Vanessa Carlton chronology
Be Not Nobody (2002)	Harmonium (2004)

Singles from Be Not Nobody
- 1. "A Thousand Miles" Released: February 18, 2002; 2. "Ordinary Day" Released: July 1, 2002; 3. "Pretty Baby" Released: December 2, 2002

Be Not Nobody is the debut studio album by American singer-songwriter Vanessa Carlton, released on April 30, 2002, through A&M Records. As of late 2004 the album had sold 1.38 million copies in the US according to Nielsen SoundScan, and Variety magazine reported in July 2003 that it had sold 2.3 million worldwide. Billboard magazine placed Carlton at number twenty-one on its year-end "Top Pop Artists" list for 2002.

"A Thousand Miles" was released as the lead single from the album and reached the top five on the US Billboard Hot 100, number one in Australia and the top ten in the United Kingdom. Be Not Nobody was certified gold by the RIAA in June 2002, and platinum in October 2002. "Ordinary Day" charted inside the top forty on the US Hot 100. "Pretty Baby" was remixed and released as the album's third and final single in early 2003. After the single's release, subsequent pressings of the album contained the remixed single version of the song in place of its original album version. "Pretty Baby" did not appear on the Hot 100 or the UK top seventy-five, but was nominated for a 2003 Teen Choice Award for "Choice Love Song".

== Critical reception ==
Professional ratings
Review scores
Source	Rating
AllMusic	4/5 stars
Entertainment Weekly	C
Rolling Stone	2.5/5 stars
Slant Magazine	3.5/5 stars

AllMusic's Stephen Thomas Erlewine praised the album for being "charmingly ambitious" with using "soaring strings, intimate pianos, crooned vocals, and pretty melodies" that showcase Carlton's potential as an emotive songwriter, concluding that: "Be Not Nobody is naïve, but much of it's well crafted and nearly all of it is endearing; it's a rare debut that is quite enjoyable in its own right yet is almost more enticing because of what it suggests that she could do next." Sal Cinquemani of Slant Magazine felt that the record's "youthful sincerity" saves Carlton from "career-damaging parallels" to Fiona Apple and Tori Amos, but was critical of her vocals rarely reaching the "sonic heights" of said predecessors. Chris Willman of Entertainment Weekly wrote, "She's almost got Tori's intricate keyboard figures and edgy vocal style down, but there'll be none of the famous Amos loopiness in these earnest self-help bromides." Ernest Hardy of Rolling Stone commended the album's impeccable musicanship but felt it was in service of "overwrought victim-of-love material that's been done to death," and critiqued that Carlton's performance compared to her inspirations "seems to be playing dress-up in their emotions and themes."

== Track listing ==
All songs were written by Vanessa Carlton, except where noted.

1. "Ordinary Day" – 3:58
2. "Unsung" – 4:20
3. "A Thousand Miles" – 3:57
4. "Pretty Baby" – 3:55
5. "Rinse" – 4:31
6. "Sway" – 3:57
7. "Paradise" – 4:50
8. "Prince" – 4:09
9. "Paint It Black" (Mick Jagger, Keith Richards) – 3:30
10. "Wanted" – 3:55
11. "Twilight" – 4:49

UK bonus track

12. "Wanted" (Ripe Mix) – 3:55

Japanese bonus tracks

12. "Twilight" (Live) – 4:07
13. "Wanted" (Ripe Mix) – 3:55

Asian Tour Edition bonus tracks

12. "A Thousand Miles (Piano & Vocal - Live in Tokyo)" – 4:02
13. "Ordinary Day (Piano & Vocal - Live in Holland)" – 3:47
14. "Paradise" (Piano & Vocal Version) – 3:49
15. "A Thousand Miles" (Live in New York) (Video) – 4:26

Reissues

4. "Pretty Baby" (single version) – 4:08

== Personnel ==
Credits adapted from AllMusic and album's liner notes.

Musicians

- Vanessa Carlton – piano, vocals
- Abe Laboriel Jr. – drums
- John Goux – guitar, dulcimer, sitar
- Leland Sklar – bass guitar
- Ron Fair – vibraphone, organ, harmonica
- Alex Al – electric upright bass (8)
- Chuck Berghofer – upright bass (7)
- Luis Conte – percussion

Orchestra

- Endre Granat (concertmaster), Eun Mee Ahn, Jackie Brand, Charlie Bisharat (electric violin on track 6), Becky Bunnell, Bruce Dukov, Franklyn D'Antonio, Mario de León, Joel Derouin, Armen Garabedian, Berj Garabedian, Alan Grunfeld, Clayton Haslop, Tamara Hatwan, Amy Hershberger, Lily HoChen, Kirstin Fife, Tiffany Hu, Natalie Leggett, Phillip Levy, Rene Mandel, Robin Olson, Sid Page, Sara Parkins, Katia Popov, Barbara Porter, Marie Robertson, Anatoly Rosinsky, John Wittenberg, Margaret Wooten, Ken Yerke – violin
- Dmitri Boviard, Paul Cohen, Matt Cooker, Brian Dembow, Karen Elaine, Marlow Fisher, Sam Formacola, Keith Grezen, Vicky Miskolczy, Simon Oswell, Karen van Sant, David Walther – viola
- Bob Adcock, Larry Corbett, Steve Erdody, Suzie Katayama, Armen Ksadjikian, Tim Landauer, David Low, Cecilia Tsan – cello
- Nico Abandolo, Trey Henry, Mike Valerio – double bass
- Gayle Levant – harp
- Rose Corrigan, Cindy Ellis, Susan Greenberg, Dan Higgins (recorder on track 5), David Shostac, Sheridon Stokes, Larry Williams – woodwinds
- Emil Richards – vibraphone (11)
- Tommy Morgan – harmonica (11)
- Dan Greco – cymbalon (5)
- Bill Hughes – orchestra contractor

Technical personnel

- Vanessa Carlton – arranger, executive producer
- Ron Fair – production, arranger, executive producer, orchestral arrangements and conductor (1–10)
- Randy Kerber – orchestral arrangements and conductor (11)
- Tal Herzberg – engineer, digital editing
- Jack Joseph Puig – mixing (1–3, 5, 6, 8, 9)
- Michael C. Ross – engineer, mixing (7, 10, 11)
- Hugh Padgham – mixing (4)
- Bill Schnee – additional recording
- Erik Reichers, Bryan Cook, Jeff Rothschild, Jim Danis, Chris Wonzer, J.D. Andrew, Frank G, Brian Vibberts, Chris Steffen, Jay Goin – assistant engineers
- Eddy Schreyer – mastering
- Drew FitzGerald – art direction, additional illustration
- Kurt Iswarienko – photography
- Alan Silfen, Jim Wright – additional photography
- Stephanie Woolf – stylist

== Charts ==
=== Weekly charts ===
Weekly chart performance for Be Not Nobody
Chart (2002)	Peak position
Australian Albums (ARIA)	13
Austrian Albums (Ö3 Austria)	13
Belgian Albums (Ultratop Flanders)	17
Belgian Albums (Ultratop Wallonia)	24
Danish Albums (Hitlisten)	20
Dutch Albums (Album Top 100)	14
French Albums (SNEP)	17
German Albums (Offizielle Top 100)	7
Irish Albums (IRMA)	14
Japanese Albums (Oricon)	17
New Zealand Albums (RMNZ)	23
Norwegian Albums (VG-lista)	33
Scottish Albums (OCC)	10
Swedish Albums (Sverigetopplistan)	44
Swiss Albums (Schweizer Hitparade)	15
UK Albums (OCC)	7
US Billboard 200	5
European Albums (Eurotipsheet)	12

=== Year-end charts ===
Year-end chart performance for Be Not Body
Chart (2002)	Position
Australian Albums (ARIA)	81
Canadian Albums (Nielsen SoundScan)	153
Dutch Albums (Album Top 100)	98
French Albums (SNEP)	134
German Albums (Offizielle Top 100)	78
Swiss Albums (Schweizer Hitparade)	63
UK Albums (OCC)	109
US Billboard 200	76

Chart (2003)	Position
US Billboard 200	188

== Certifications ==
Certifications and sales figures for Be Not Nobody
Region	Certification	Certified units/sales
Australia (ARIA)	Gold	35,000^{^}
Canada (Music Canada)	Gold	50,000^{^}
Japan (RIAJ)	Platinum	200,000
New Zealand (RMNZ)	Gold	7,500^{‡}
United Kingdom (BPI)	Gold	100,000^{^}
United States (RIAA)	Platinum	1,380,000
^{^} Shipments figures based on certification alone.^{‡} Sales+streaming figures based on certification alone.
