= Veils =

Studio album by Vanessa Carlton
- Released: April 17, 2026
- Recorded: 2024–2025
- Studio: Tarbox Road (Cassadaga, New York)
- Length: 35:10
- Label: Liberman
- Producer: Dave Fridmann

Vanessa Carlton chronology
Love Is an Art (2020)	Veils (2026)

Singles from Animal
- 1. "Animal" Released: November 11, 2025; 2. "Great House" Released: February 24, 2026

Veils is the seventh studio album by American singer-songwriter Vanessa Carlton. The album was released on April 17, 2026 through Liberman Records. It is the follow-up to Carlton's previous studio album, Love Is an Art (2020), and is her second album produced by Dave Fridmann, a producer known for his work with Sleater-Kinney, the Flaming Lips and MGMT.

== Background ==
Carlton spent four years writing Veils and it was mixed in early 2025. She described the title of the album as being encompassing the composition of the entire album: "I really looked at a lot of the songs as embodying different versions of the same person. There's layers upon layers within the record. It's almost like each song, you're lifting a new layer to the next veil. Who is the real person? I don't know, but it all encapsulates a human experience, and however someone connects to it, to which veil, that's their experience."

During a live show in Cincinnati in April 2026, Carlton described how the album was recorded in two sessions: one during the end of summer 2024 and the other winter of 2025.

== Track listing ==
Track listing is adapted from the album's liner notes.

Veils track listing
No.	Title	Writer(s)	Length
1.	"Animal"	Tristen Gaspadarek; Vanessa Carlton	4:04
2.	"Unknown Driver"	John J. McCauley, III; Gaspadarek; Carlton	4:14
3.	"Woke Up High"	Gaspaderek; Carlton	3:26
4.	"The Mountain"	McCauley; Gaspadarek; Carlton	3:04
5.	"Great House"	Carlton	3:34
6.	"He Was a Dancer"	Gaspaderek; Carlton	2:50
7.	"Agony of the Flower"	Gaspaderek; Carlton	3:37
8.	"I'm Not Dead"	Gaspaderek; Carlton	2:38
9.	"Strawberries in Winter"	Gaspaderek; Carlton	3:18
10.	"Veils"	Carlton	4:25
Total length:			35:10

== Personnel ==
Credits are adapted from the album's liner notes.

- Vanessa Carlton – piano, vocals (all tracks); synthesizers (tracks 1, 6), Wurly (2, 6, 7), Farfisa (2, 7), Rhodes (2, 8, 9), Nord pipe organ (2), Nord synthesizer (5, 8); vibes, Mellotron (7); harpsichord (9)
- Dave Fridmann – production, engineering, mixing (all tracks); drum machine programming (1, 2, 4, 8), bass (1, 3, 4, 6–8), additional synthesizers (1), synthesizer programming (2); additional drum machine programming, synthesizers (3); additional synth bass (5); drum programming, harp (7); synth effects (10)
- Jon Fridmann – additional production, engineering (all tracks); French horn (1, 2, 4, 9), bass trombone (1, 2, 4, 10), drums (1, 2, 7, 8), electric guitar (1, 3–5, 7, 8), bongos (1, 8), Juno (1), timpani (2, 4, 9), chimes (2, 4), trombone (2, 7); additional drum programming, flugelhorn (2); synthesizers (3, 9); drum machine programming, synth bass, sound effects programming (3); flute (4, 5, 7), recorder (4, 7, 9), snare drum (4, 8), cymbals (4); synthesizer programming, vibes (5); claves, cabasa, tambourine, woodblock, additional drum machines (8); mark tree, celeste (9)
- John McCauley – electric guitar (2), acoustic guitar (4, 5)
- Emily Lazar – mastering
- Bob DeMaa – mastering assistance
- InteriorState – artwork
