= Jo Ratcliffe =

British artist

- Born: Berkshire, England
- Occupations: Animator, Illustrator, Art Director
- Website: www.jocandraw.com

Jo Ratcliffe is a London based artist known for her kaleidoscopic animations, strange hand-drawn characters, and spindly scenes sometimes overlain atop live action footage. She is frequently commissioned by fashion labels and magazines to create art films, animations and editorials that appear both online and in print. Her illustrations are highly visible, regularly featured on the covers of Vogue Nippon and Vogue UK, as well as in the promotional imagery of Louis Vuitton. Ratcliffe is also an animation director and designer for notable clients such as Lady Gaga, Kenzo, Barneys New York, Jimmy Choo and Louis Vuitton. Her in-house studio consists of herself and a specialist team focusing on illustration, animation, graphic design, logo design, and other various disciplines.

== Early life and education ==
Born in Berkshire, England, Jo Ratcliffe studied painting and print making at Saint Martin's College of Art and Design in London. Just out of college, she got her first art job drawing the comic book adventures of "Cindy" for Marvel Comics. Ratcliffe wielded this same hand-drawn aesthetic in her early editorial work for London-based fashion-art magazine, Dazed and Confused, to which she regularly contributed, incorporating illustration into graphics. Although she came from a background of working with traditional media, Ratcliffe later taught herself Photoshop and Illustrator - still her tools of choice.

== Career ==
Jo Ratcliffe is known for her animated fashion films, typographic work, and graphics. But her surreal illustrations of lanky, hand drawn women have also garnered attention from magazines like Another Magazine, V Magazine, Juxtapoz, computerarts, NOWNESS and "The Gentlewoman." Stylistically, Ratcliffe's work lends itself to fashion and hand drawn illustration.

Ratcliffe has served as director and designer on fashion films both animated and live-action for high-profile fashion labels, including Nina Ricci, Kenzo, Chloe, Jimmy Choo, Barneys New York, and Cole Haan. In an interview with crane.tv she discusses a project she did with Kate Moss and, fashion house, Balmain in which she was asked to convey Moss's mood through animation.

In addition to animation and illustration, Jo Ratcliffe also specialises in logo design as well as set design. Her sets have been used on photo shoots for American Vogue and Wallpaper Magazine. And her candy colored, typographic work appears on the album cover of Katy Perry's "Teenage Dream.'

Ratcliffe has also worked extensively with famous photography duo Inez van Lamsweerde and Vinoodh Matadin as members of theCollectiveShift. She collaborated on Lady Gaga's 2013 music video Applause as the animation director. Previous notable collaborations have also been made with Nina Ricci and Barneys New York under Inez and Vinoodh.

Clients include: Lady Gaga, Louis Vuitton, Barneys New York, Balmain, Nina Ricci, Chloe, Kenzo, Jimmy Choo, Vogue Nippon, British Vogue, Another Magazine, V magazine, Dazed and Confused Magazine, Wallpaper Magazine, Nylon Magazine, and Nowness Magazine.
