= A Thousand Miles =

2002 single by Vanessa Carlton

Single by Vanessa Carlton

from the album Be Not Nobody
- B-side: "Twilight" (live)
- Released: February 18, 2002
- Genre: Pop rock; orchestral pop
- Length: 3:57
- Label: A&M
- Songwriter: Vanessa Carlton
- Producers: Ron Fair; Curtis Schweitzer

Vanessa Carlton singles chronology
"A Thousand Miles" (2002)	"Ordinary Day" (2002)

Music video
- "A Thousand Miles" on YouTube

"A Thousand Miles" (originally titled "Interlude") is a song by American pop singer-songwriter Vanessa Carlton, released as her debut single. Written by Carlton and produced by Curtis Schweitzer and Ron Fair, the song was serviced to American radio in February 2002 by A&M Records as the lead single from Carlton's first studio album, Be Not Nobody (2002).

The song originated in a piano riff that Carlton wrote in 1998, titled "Interlude". She later recorded a demo tape of the full song, which reached Fair at A&M Records. Its production was reworked to include an orchestra section, and it was retitled "A Thousand Miles" at Fair's insistence. To promote the song, an accompanying music video was released, featuring Carlton playing the piano while it moves through Los Angeles. It was also featured in the films Legally Blonde (2001) and White Chicks (2004).

"A Thousand Miles" received critical acclaim, with reviewers praising Carlton's vocals and the song's composition. It was nominated for three Grammy Awards at the 45th Annual Grammy Awards, including Record of the Year. The song was commercially successful, becoming Carlton's biggest hit in the United States and her only single to reach the top 10 of the Billboard Hot 100, peaking at number five. It also reached number one in Australia, number three in Ireland, and the top 10 in the United Kingdom, France, Italy, the Netherlands, and New Zealand.

== Background and recording ==
Vanessa Carlton wrote the song's piano riff in mid-1998 at her parents' house in Philadelphia; her mother Heidi Lee, who had been listening to her, said, "Vanessa, that's a hit song." Carlton was unable to finish the song because of a case of writer's block and did not return to it for several months. While looking for a record label that would sign her, Carlton played the beginning of the song for a record producer, who said, "You have to finish that." She returned to her parents' home and finished it in an hour one evening, naming it "Interlude". She told VH1 in 2004, "I just sit down and write my songs ... It just kind of happened and it will never happen again like that."

Some years later, Carlton recorded a demo tape (which featured several tracks, including "Interlude") and sent it to various producers and labels in the hopes that one would sign her. Some expressed interest, but Carlton did not agree with their suggestions for alternative titles for the song. One of the tapes found its way to Ron Fair, head of A&M Records, who recalled that "it was extraordinary, but also in some respects kind of screwed up as a record. It didn't press the emotional buttons the way I envisioned it". Carlton then met with Fair for a piano session to alter the arrangement of the song "so the heartbeat came in a different way". During this session, more transitions were inserted into the song, and the timing of the repetition of the chorus was changed. Additionally, the instrumental opening was shortened and an orchestra section was added by Fair; the lyrics, however, remained the same. He explained: "It has a lot of starts and stops to it, which makes it hard to achieve a flow, but I wanted to make a really dramatic record. The song is like a mini musical of its own."

"A Thousand Miles" took 14 sessions to record and was the first song recorded for Be Not Nobody. As well as conducting the orchestra, Fair also organized a small band for its recording: John Goux played guitar on the track, Leland Sklar played bass guitar, and Abe Laboriel Jr. played drums. Carlton later said, "After listening to it I realized I was going to make an album that I was very proud of."

== Music and lyrics ==
"A Thousand Miles"
A 24-second excerpt from the beginning of the song. It contains the piano hook which Billboard noted "endures with urgency" and "lends [the song] a spectacular charm".

"A Thousand Miles" is written in the key of B major and composed with a tempo of 95 beats per minute. Carlton says that the song was inspired by a crush she had on a Juilliard student (who is now a "very famous actor") whom she met while she was attending the School of American Ballet. She further stated that because she never actually spoke to her crush due to her shyness, she felt like she had "a better chance of falling up than ever having a relationship with this person". She has also called the song "a combination of reality and fantasy. It's about a love that so consumes you that you do anything for it. That's how I felt at that time."

The selection of the song's title was accompanied by a minor disagreement between Carlton and Fair, who was reportedly "adamant" about changing it. Fair said, "Vanessa Carlton is an incredible talent, but she's also very stubborn... I had to say, 'Look, I'm the president of the label, we're not calling it "Interlude". ' When you're trying to launch a career, people need a handle to pick things up from, and the word 'Interlude' is never in the song". The final title of the song, "A Thousand Miles", was based on a suggestion by Fair's nephew. After the song's completion, Fair said that he listened to it repeatedly and "it made me weep. That's usually my litmus test. If I cry, I know it's a hit". Despite this, he was concerned that the song's piano basis would put it at a disadvantage in the marketplace if it were to be released as a single.

== Critical reception ==
"A Thousand Miles" was highly acclaimed by music critics. Billboard magazine opined, "it's the song's classical-tied piano hook that endures with urgency throughout the song that lends it spectacular charm, along with the artist's vulnerable vocal style... A truly auspicious opening." Most other critics gave Be Not Nobody mixed reviews but generally praised the song. AllMusic wrote: "as it moves from its solo orchestral-backed choruses, the result isn't overwhelming, it's sweet, multi-layered, and appealing". Sean Richardson of the Boston Phoenix made favorable comparisons between "A Thousand Miles" and Michelle Branch's debut single "Everywhere", saying, "it's a good-natured reverie, with none of the troubled soul searching that characterizes the work of Tori and Fiona. She occasionally evokes her piano-playing predecessors by raising her girlish voice to a howl, but she's better off being herself". Adrien Begrand of PopMatters magazine said the song was "catchy and hard to dislike" but characterized it as "the sort of girly-voiced, introspective pop that is made to please people who are looking for singer/songwriters who look and sound profound, but actually have nothing to say".

"A Thousand Miles" won in the Can't Get You Out of My Head category at the VH1 Big in 2002 Awards, and it was nominated for three Grammy Awards: Record of the Year, Song of the Year and Best Instrumental Arrangement Accompanying Vocalist(s) at the 45th Annual Grammy Awards. It lost Song of the Year and Record of the Year to Norah Jones' "Don't Know Why", while the Best Instrumental Arrangement Accompanying Vocalist(s) award went to "Mean Old Man", performed by James Taylor. The song became popular amongst U.S. troops serving in Iraq, and in April 2003, the Chicago Sun-Times reported that it had become the most requested song on the radio station British Forces Broadcasting Service Middle East. Carlton responded, "Perhaps, 'A Thousand Miles' conveys the feelings and longing and desperation that the U.S. soldiers feel for their loved ones. I don't know. But whatever peace I am able to bring to the hearts of the people at war is a contribution that I am proud of". By May 2003 the website Musicnotes had sold a record 10,000 pieces of digital sheet music for "A Thousand Miles", and it won the website's Song of the Year award. The song's production team was nominated for a 2003 Technical Excellence & Creativity Award in the category of Outstanding Creative Achievement in Record Production — Single or Track.

== Commercial performance ==
In the United States, "A Thousand Miles" debuted on the Billboard Hot 100 chart on the week dated March 2, 2002; it peaked at number five for three weeks in May 2002 and remained on the chart for 41 weeks. Be Not Nobody was released on April 30, and, partly because of the popularity of "A Thousand Miles", it debuted within the top five of the Billboard 200 chart with first-week sales of over 101,000 copies. In was the sixth-most-successful single of 2002 in the US. Worldwide, "A Thousand Miles" was a top-five hit in Ireland and France and entered the top 10 in several other European countries, including the United Kingdom, Italy, and the Netherlands. In Australia, it held the number-one position on the ARIA Singles Chart for two weeks in August 2002, ending the year as Australia's sixth-best-selling single. E! Online said the song was "a bona fide hit for good reason. Catchy pop on the surface, it has melodic complexity beneath that bodes well for repeated listening".

== Music video ==
Fair played "A Thousand Miles" in front of his superior Jimmy Iovine, the co-chairman of Interscope-Geffen-A&M. Iovine was very impressed with the song and requested that a music video be filmed immediately for it. After the video had been completed it was presented to Tom Calderone, the Vice President of Programming for MTV, in early 2002. Calderone expressed a desire to begin broadcasting the video at once and Fair agreed to his request, even though the album was still in production at the time and Carlton's marketing "image" had not yet been developed.

Directed by Marc Klasfeld, the music video was filmed in Newbury Park, California, and in areas of Downtown Los Angeles such as State Theater. There was no use of green screen or visual effects; Carlton's piano and bench were moved using a flatbed truck and a custom-built dolly, and she wore a seat belt under her skirt to secure herself to the bench.

Carlton told the website Contactmusic.com of the first time she watched the single's music video, in which she is seen playing the piano while traveling through a variety of settings:

I was in the studio and had just taken a break, when someone ran in the room and said, "You're on MTV!" We put it on and I just stared at the screen. After a few minutes, I just covered my eyes and started to laugh. It seemed so surreal. The night after that, I heard the song on the radio for the first time. It was all so unbelievable.

Carlton felt that Klasfeld "captured who I was in that video", and he was selected to direct the video for the album's follow-up single, "Ordinary Day". The music video for "A Thousand Miles" received heavy airplay on the channel following its premiere on the top-ten video program Total Request Live on January 4, 2002, and was popular enough to be retired from the show's countdown.

== Legacy ==
"A Thousand Miles" is Carlton's most successful single and her only top-20 hit in the United States. It continued to receive regular rotation on adult contemporary and adult pop radio stations two years after its original release, and Billboard magazine has named it "one of the most enduring songs of the millennium". A writer for the Boston Phoenix said that with the song, Carlton "won favor with smart but awkward teenage girls who didn't see themselves in more evidently constructed teen-pop personalities like Britney Spears and Christina Aguilera", and Slant magazine said it "helped pave the way for an industry beginning to take a turn away from bubblegum pop". Carlton has said that rappers such as Fabolous and Ja Rule "really like this song." "A Thousand Miles" was sampled in the Yungeen Ace single "Who I Smoke", a usage which Carlton approved of and defended from criticism.

In its finished form, the song was first heard during a scene in the Reese Witherspoon film Legally Blonde (2001) and was included on the film's soundtrack under the title "A Thousand Miles (Interlude)". In the film White Chicks (2004), the song is used several times, including when Terry Crews' character sings along to it in a "perfect rendition".

== Track listings ==
US CD single
No.	Title	Length
1.	"A Thousand Miles"
2.	"Twilight" (live)
3.	"Enhanced Section" (includes video, photo gallery, hyperlink, and Universal Media Player skin)

UK CD single
No.	Title	Length
1.	"A Thousand Miles"
2.	"Paradise" (piano-vocal)
3.	"Red Ditty" (Non-LP version)
4.	"A Thousand Miles" (CD-ROM video)

UK cassette single
No.	Title	Length
1.	"A Thousand Miles"
2.	"Paradise" (piano-vocal)

European and Japanese CD single
No.	Title	Length
1.	"A Thousand Miles"
2.	"Twilight" (live)

Australian CD single
No.	Title	Length
1.	"A Thousand Miles"
2.	"Twilight" (live)
3.	"Wanted" (Ripe mix)
4.	"A Thousand Miles" (video)

== Personnel ==
- Vanessa Carlton – vocals, piano
- Abe Laboriel Jr. – drums
- John Goux – guitar
- Leland Sklar – bass guitar
- Ron Fair – string arrangement

== Charts ==
=== Weekly charts ===
Chart (2002)	Peak position
Australia (ARIA)	1
Austria (Ö3 Austria Top 40)	12
Belgium (Ultratop 50 Flanders)	4
Belgium (Ultratop 50 Wallonia)	8
Canada CHR (Nielsen BDS)	5
Denmark (Tracklisten)	3
Europe (Eurochart Hot 100)	9
France (SNEP)	8
Germany (GfK)	14
Hungary (Rádiós Top 40)	5
Hungary (Single Top 40)	8
Ireland (IRMA)	3
Italy (FIMI)	6
Netherlands (Dutch Top 40)	6
Netherlands (Single Top 100)	12
New Zealand (Recorded Music NZ)	4
Norway (VG-lista)	14
Poland (Nielsen Music Control)	2
Romania (Romanian Top 100)	8
Scottish Singles Sales (Official Charts)	7
Sweden (Sverigetopplistan)	30
Switzerland (Schweizer Hitparade)	8
UK Singles (Official Charts)	6
US Billboard Hot 100	5
US Adult Contemporary (Billboard)	1
US Adult Pop Airplay (Billboard)	2
US Pop Airplay (Billboard)	1

=== Year-end charts ===
Chart (2002)	Position
Australia (ARIA)	6
Austria (Ö3 Austria Top 40)	74
Belgium (Ultratop 50 Flanders)	20
Belgium (Ultratop 50 Wallonia)	49
Brazil (Crowley)	72
Canada Radio (Nielsen BDS)	7
Europe (Eurochart Hot 100)	33
France (SNEP)	57
Germany (Media Control)	61
Ireland (IRMA)	27
Netherlands (Dutch Top 40)	9
Netherlands (Single Top 100)	48
New Zealand (RIANZ)	2
Switzerland (Schweizer Hitparade)	20
UK Singles (OCC)	73
UK Airplay (Music Week)	33
US Billboard Hot 100	6
US Adult Contemporary (Billboard)	10
US Adult Top 40 (Billboard)	4
US Mainstream Top 40 (Billboard)	5

Chart (2003)	Position
US Adult Contemporary (Billboard)	4
US Adult Top 40 (Billboard)	41

=== Decade-end charts ===
Chart (2000–2009)	Position
Australia (ARIA)	70

== Certifications ==
Region	Certification	Certified units/sales
Australia (ARIA)	2× Platinum	140,000^{^}
Belgium (BRMA)	Gold	25,000^{*}
Brazil (Pro-Música Brasil)	Gold	30,000^{‡}
Denmark (IFPI Danmark)	Platinum	90,000^{‡}
France (SNEP)	Silver	125,000^{*}
Germany (BVMI)	Gold	250,000^{‡}
Italy (FIMI)	Gold	50,000^{‡}
Japan (RIAJ)	Gold	100,000^{*}
New Zealand (RMNZ)	3× Platinum	90,000^{‡}
Spain (Promusicae) Live Acoustic	Gold	30,000^{‡}
United Kingdom (BPI)	2× Platinum	1,200,000^{‡}
^{*} Sales figures based on certification alone.^{^} Shipments figures based on certification alone.^{‡} Sales+streaming figures based on certification alone.

== Release history ==
Region	Date	Format(s)	Label(s)	Ref(s).
United States	February 18–19, 2002	Top 40; modern adult contemporary; hot adult contemporary radio	A&M	
Japan	May 2, 2002	CD	A&M	
Australia	May 20, 2002	CD	A&M	
United Kingdom	July 22, 2002	CD; cassette	A&M	

== See also ==
- List of Billboard Adult Contemporary number ones of 2002
- List of number-one singles in Australia in 2002
- 2002 in music
- "Who I Smoke"
