= List of programmes broadcast by MTV in Asia =

These are the programs that have been shown in MTV & VH1 in South-east Asia. Some of the programs listed were shown on different MTV & VH1 stations, particularly on MTV Philippines, MTV Pinoy, MTVph, MTV Indonesia, MTV Thailand, MTV India, MTV Pakistan, MTV Korea, MTV Japan, VH1 Indonesia, and VH1 Philippines.

== 0–9 ==
- 4Minute's Friend Day – only on MTV Korea
- 5 Things You Need to Know About...
- 5taku Mansion – only on MTV Korea
- 8th & Ocean
- 16 and Pregnant
- 16 and Recovering
- 90's House
- 100% Pinoy
- 2020 Code

== A ==
- The Adventures of Chico and Guapo
- Adult Contemporary Definitive Chart (AC/DC) – only on MTV Southeast Asia
- Advance Warning
- Adventures in Hollywood
- Æon Flux
- After Hours – only on MTV Philippines
- After School Rocks – only on MTV Southeast Asia
- After School Alone – only on MTV Southeast Asia
- After School Anthems – only on MTV Southeast Asia
- Afternoon Anthems – only on MTV Southeast Asia
- Alay – only on MTV Indonesia
- Alternative Countdown – only on MTV Southeast Asia
- Alternative Nation
- All Things Rock – only on MTV Philippines
- Alternative China – only on MTV China
- Amazingness
- America's Best Dance Crew
- Ampuh Compilation Hits – only on MTV Indonesia
- Ampuh Est. 1996 – only on MTV Indonesia
- Ampuh It's the Show – only on MTV Indonesia
- Ampuh Nokia Stairway To Show – only on MTV Indonesia
- Ampuh Review – only on MTV Indonesia
- The Andy Milonakis Show
- Are You the One? Second Chances
- Artist of the Month – only on MTV China
- Artists Special – only on MTV Southeast Asia
- The Ashlee Simpson Show
- The Asia Countdown – only on MTV Southeast Asia
- Asia Rocks – only on MTV Southeast Asia
- Asian Hits – only on MTV Southeast Asia
- Asian Takeaway – only on MTV Southeast Asia
- The Assistant
- Audrina
- Awkward

== B ==
- B+ Diary – only on MTV Korea
- BackTrack
- Balcony Stories XL – only on MTV Southeast Asia
- Bam's Unholy Union
- Banger Vibes – only on MTV Southeast Asia
- Barrio 19 – only on MTV Korea
- Battle for Ozzfest
- Be Seen @ MTV – only on MTV Philippines
- Beats MTV – only on MTV Southeast Asia
- Beauty School Cop Outs
- Beavis and Butt-Head
- Becoming
- Behind the Music
- Being Terry Kennedy
- Bellator MMA – only on MTV Southeast Asia, relay from Paramount Channel
- Big Bang – only on MTV Korea
- Big Tips Texas
- BIJK pop – only on MTV Indonesia; on ANTV
- Blowin' Up
- Blue Mountain State
- Boiling Points
- Boiling Points (Malaysian edition)
- Breaking from Above
- Bromance
- Brothers Green: Eats!
- Bugging Out
- Bujang – only on MTV Indonesia
- Bullied
- Burned
- Bustamove

== C ==
- Caged
- Canto Hits – only on MTV China
- Canton Chart – only on MTV China
- Call to Greatness
- Car Crash Couples
- Celeb Ex in the City
- The Celebrity Agency
- Celebrity Bites
- Celebrity Deathmatch
- Celebrity Ex on the Beach
- Celebrity Rap Superstar
- The Challenge: Vendettas
- Channel Fiestar – only on MTV Korea
- The Charlotte Show
- Chart Attack
- Chelsea Settles
- Cheyenne
- Chito Chat – only on MTV Southeast Asia
- China Block – only on MTV Southeast Asia
- The City
- Class Up – only on MTV Korea
- Classic MTV
- Classics on Harley – only on MTV Southeast Asia
- Clickbait
- Colt 45 Rockista – only on MTV Philippines
- Comeback Show Top 10 – only on MTV Korea
- Countdown Express – only on MTV Korea
- Crank Yankers
- Crash Canyon
- Crash Karaoke
- Crispy News

== D ==
- D-Tour
- Daddy's Girl
- Đại Sứ Ước Mơ – only on MTV Vietnam
- Dalshabet's Cool Friends – only on MTV Korea
- DanceLife
- Dare to Live
- Daria
- Date N Style – only on MTV Indonesia
- Degrassi
- Deliciousness
- Diary
- Diary with... – only on MTV Korea
- Disaster Date
- Dismissed
- Do It – only on MTV Indonesia
- A Double Shot at Love
- Double Trouble
- Dr. Bunny's MV White Paper – only on MTV Korea
- Drama Queen – only on MTV Indonesia
- Dream Station – only on MTV Korea
- Driven
- The Dudesons in America
- Dustin Hits MTV – only on MTV Vietnam

== E ==
- EDM Hits – only on MTV China
- EDM Countdown – only on MTV Southeast Asia
- Essential VH1 – only on MTV Philippines
- Ex on the Beach: Body SOS
- Ex on the Beach UK
- Exiled
- Extreme Cribs

== F ==
- The Fabulous Life of... (VH1)
- Faking the Video
- Families of the Mafia
- The Family Crews
- Famous Crime Scene
- Famous Face – only on MTV Korea
- Favourite Top 10 – only on MTV Indonesia
- Fear Factor
- Final Fu
- Finding Carter
- Fired by Mom & Dad
- Fist of Zen
- Flash Prank
- Flipped
- Flipside – only in MTV Southeast Asia
- Floribama Shore
- Footballer's Cribs
- For You in Full Blossom – only on MTV Korea
- Fraternity Life
- Friday Night Music
- Friendzone
- From G's To Gents

== G ==
- Gaya Bebas – only on MTV Indonesia
- Game Changer
- Game of Clones
- Geordie Shore
- Gerek Seh – only on MTV Southeast Asia
- Get Hitch'd
- Get Skool'd
- Get Spotted – only on MTV Philippines
- Getar Cinta
- Ghosted: Love Gone Missing
- Gimme 10 – only on MTV Philippines
- Girl Code
- Girls Meet Beauty – only on MTV Korea
- Girls on the Top – only on MTV Korea
- Global Room – only on MTV Indonesia
- Globally Dismissed
- Good Morning VH1 – only on VH1 India
- Gotik – only on MTV Indonesia
- The Grind
- The Groove – only in MTV Southeast Asia
- Grossbusters
- Guy Code

== H ==
- Happy Tree Friends
- The Hard Times of RJ Berger
- High School Stories
- The Hills
- The Hills: New Beginnings
- Hip-Hop Countdown
- Hip Up Boys – only on MTV Korea
- Hogan Knows Best
- Hollywood Heights
- Home Purchasing Club
- Homewrecker
- House of Food
- House of MTV – only on MTV Philippines
- Human Giant

== I ==
- I Bet You Will
- I Want a Famous Face
- I Used to Be Fat
- I'm from Rolling Stone
- Iced Out – only on MTV Philippines
- ICONic – only on MTV Southeast Asia
- Idol Battle Cook – only on MTV Southeast Asia & MTV Korea
- Idol United – only on MTV Korea
- If You Like, Try This – only on MTV Southeast Asia
- If You Really Knew Me
- The Inbetweeners
- Indo Klasik – only on MTV Indonesia
- Indonesia Super Bands – only on MTV Indonesia
- Inkigayo – only on MTV Korea
- Inkigayo Magazine – only on MTV Korea
- Insomnia – only on MTV Indonesia

== J ==
- Jackass
- Japan Hits – only on MTV Southeast Asia, MTV China & Taiwan
- Jersey Shore
- Jersey Shore: Family Vacation
- Jessica Simpson's The Price of Beauty
- JK Hits – only on MTV Southeast Asia
- Just Tattoo of Us

== K ==
- K-Pop Festival LIVE in Kumanoto 2013 – only on MTV Korea
- K-Pop Festival in Gangwon 2013 – only on MTV Korea
- K-Pop Hero – only on MTV Korea
- K-pop Star – only on MTV Korea
- K-Krush – only on MTV Southeast Asia
- K-Wave – only on MTV Southeast Asia
- K-Wave Karaoke – only on MTV Southeast Asia
- KARA's Meta Friends – only on MTV Korea
- Kamal Sutra – only on MTV Southeast Asia
- Kitni Mast Hai Zindagi – only on MTV India & MTV Indonesia (2006)
- Kountdown – only on MTV Korea

== L ==
- The L.A. Complex
- Laguna Beach: The Real Orange County
- The Lair
- Late Night on MTV – only on MTV Pakistan
- Late Night Vibes – only on MTV Southeast Asia
- Law of the Jungle – only on MTV Korea
- Let Me Show – only on MTV Korea
- Life's a Beach – only on MTV Southeast Asia
- Life of Ryan
- Lip Service
- Live Wow Special – only on MTV Korea
- Lokal Abbies – only on MTV Indonesia

== M ==
- M Chat – only on MTV Japan
- M Size – only on MTV Japan
- Made 11
- Make It Beauty – only on MTV Korea
- Making the Band
- Making the Movie – only on MTV Korea
- Making the Musical – only on MTV Korea
- Making the Video
- Mando-Love – only on MTV Southeast Asia
- Massive – only on MTV Philippines
- Master in the House – only on MTV Korea and MTV Southeast Asia
- Match Up – only on MTV Korea
- Match Up: Block B Returns – only on MTV Korea
- Meet the Barkers
- Megadrive
- Midweek Madness – only on MTV Indonesia
- The Mission – only on MTV Indonesia
- Morning Express – only on MTV Southeast Asia
- Motormouth
- Moving In
- Music Expedition – only on MTV Korea
- Music Island – only on MTV Korea
- Musik Gue Pilihan Gue – only on MTV Indonesia
- MTV 1-2-3 (Indian chart show) – only on MTV India
- MTV 1-4-3 – only on MTV Philippines
- MTV 100% Indonesia
- MTV 4Minute – only on MTV Korea
- MTV's The 70s House
- MTV81 – only on MTV Southeast Asia
- MTV A.M. – only on MTV Thailand
- MTV After Hours – only on MTV Japan
- MTV After School – only on MTV Thailand
- MTV Afternoon Tune – only on MTV Japan
- MTV Alternative Nation
- MTV Amplified – only on MTV Southeast Asia and MTVph
- MTV Ampuh – only on MTV Indonesia
- MTV Arena – only on MTV Philippines
- MTV Asia Hitlist
- MTV Asian Delight – only on MTV Thailand
- MTV Ask
- MTV Awami – only on MTV Pakistan
- MTV B Live – only on MTV Thailand
- MTV B2ST – only on MTV Korea
- MTV Baap of Bakra – only on MTV India
- MTV Bangkok Jam – only on MTV Thailand
- MTV Barrio 19
- MTV Base – only on MTV Korea
- MTV Be Ready – only on MTV Thailand
- MTV Best.Show.Ever.
- MTV Big Chill – only on MTV Southeast Asia
- MTV Big Guns – only on MTV Pakistan
- MTV Big Picture – only on MTV India
- MTV Biorhythm
- MTV Bite Me – only on MTV Southeast Asia
- MTV Bling – only on MTV Philippines
- MTV Blog – only on MTV Thailand
- MTV Boom Top 10 – only on MTV Southeast Asia
- MTV Brand New
- MTV Breakfast Club – only on MTV Korea
- MTV Bujang – only on MTV Indonesia
- MTV Buzz – only on MTV Thailand
- MTV Celebrity Spin – only on MTV Philippines
- MTV Chart – only on MTV Thailand
- MTV Chillout – only on MTV Thailand
- MTV Chillout (India) – only on MTV India
- MTV Chinese Super 5 – only on MTV China & Taiwan
- MTV Classic
- MTV Classic Series – only on MTV Japan
- MTV Club – only on MTV Southeast Asia
- MTV Connect – only on MTV Southeast Asia
- MTV Cool Crap
- MTV The Cream – only on MTV Thailand
- MTV Cribs
- MTV Cribs Collection
- MTV Cribs: Footballers Stay Home
- MTV Cribs International
- MTV Cupid Missed
- MTV Cut 2 Cut – only on MTV India
- MTV Daily Dose – only on MTVph
- MTV Debut – only on MTV Thailand
- MTV Diyes – only on MTV Philippines
- MTV Ek Do Teen
- MTV European Top 20
- MTV Espresso – only on MTV Korea
- MTV Eye Candy – only on MTV Korea
- MTV Fanatic
- MTV Fashionista – only on MTV Southeast Asia
- MTV Fast Forward – only on MTV Thailand
- MTV Feel It – only on MTV Southeast Asia
- MTV Feel the Music – only on MTV Southeast Asia
- MTV Flashback – only on MTV Southeast Asia
- MTV Fresh – only on MTV Southeast Asia, Indonesia & MTV Japan
- MTV Front Row
- MTV Fuel – only on MTVph
- MTV Game Pad
- MTV The Games – only on MTV Southeast Asia
- MTV Get Spotted – only on MTV Philippines
- MTV Getar Cinta – only on MTV Indonesia
- MTV Girls' Generation – only on MTV Korea
- MTV GLAM – only on MTV Korea
- MTV Global Room – only on MTV Indonesia
- MTV Gokil – only on MTV Indonesia
- MTV Got Game – only on MTV Southeast Asia
- MTV Gotcha
- MTV Gress – only on MTV Indonesia
- MTV Grind
- MTV Halo-Halo – only on MTV Pinoy
- MTV Handpicked
- MTV Hanging Out
- MTV Harana – only on MTV Philippines
- MTV Hip Hop – only on MTV Southeast Asia
- MTV Homecoming – only on MTV Philippines
- MTV Homegrown – only on MTVph
- MTV Hong Kong Roadshow – only on MTV Southeast Asia
- MTV Hoopla – only on MTV Philippines
- MTV Hot – only on MTV Indonesia
- MTV Hot Picks – only on MTV Japan
- MTV Housefull – only on MTV India
- MTV Icons – only on MTV Southeast Asia & Indonesia
- MTV Idol – only on MTVph
- MTV In Control – only on MTV Southeast Asia
- MTV Insomnia – only on MTV Indonesia
- MTV Interactive – only on MTV Southeast Asia
- MTV International Top 40 Countdown – only on MTV Japan
- MTV Is Cool – only on MTV Pakistan
- MTV It's My Life – only on MTV Southeast Asia
- MTV Jams – only on MTV Southeast Asia & Indonesia
- MTV Jams Indonesia – only on MTV Indonesia
- MTV Jukebox – only on MTV Philippines
- MTV Jumpstart – only on MTV Philippines
- MTV Jus – only on MTV Southeast Asia & Malaysia
- MTV Kampus – only on MTV Southeast Asia
- MTV Kayozine – only on MTV Southeast Asia
- MTV Kickass Mornings – only on MTV India
- MTV Kopi – only on MTV Southeast Asia
- MTV Korea Top 5 – only on MTV Japan & Korea
- MTV KYA BAAT HAI – only on MTV India
- MTV Land – only on MTV Southeast Asia & Indonesia
- MTV Live and Loud
- MTV Live Wire
- MTV Loaded – only on MTV Southeast Asia
- MTV Lockdown Laughs
- MTV Lokal – only on MTV Philippines
- MTV Lokal Abiezz – only on MTV Indonesia
- MTV Loops – only on MTVph
- MTV Lost in Translation – only on MTV India
- MTV Loveline – only on MTV Philippines
- MTV The M – only on MTV Korea
- MTV M-Pop
- MTV Made
- MTV Make Over – only on MTV Indonesia
- MTV Midweek Madness – only on MTV Indonesia
- MTV Mix – only on MTV Indonesia
- MTV Mobbed – only on MTV Southeast Asia
- MTV Monday Soundsation – only on MTV Indonesia
- MTV Morning Greeting – only on MTV Indonesia
- MTV Morning Hot Picks – only on MTV Japan
- MTV Morning Show – only on MTV Indonesia
- MTV Morning TV – only on MTV Southeast Asia
- MTV Morning Tune – only on MTV Japan
- MTV Most Wanted – only on MTV Southeast Asia
- MTV Most Wanted Indonesia – only on MTV Indonesia
- MTV MotoAlert
- MTV Movie Soundtrack – only on MTV Indonesia
- MTV Mush – only on MTV Philippines
- MTV Music Remedy – only on MTV Southeast Asia
- MTV Music Revolution – only on MTV Southeast Asia
- MTV Musik Banget – only on MTV Indonesia
- MTV Musika – only on MTV Southeast Asia
- MTV New – only on MTV Indonesia
- MTV News
- MTV Next Sound – only on MTV Southeast Asia
- MTV Nights
- MTV No Limits – only on MTV Southeast Asia
- MTV Non Stop Hits – only on MTV Indonesia
- MTV Now – only on MTV Vietnam
- MTV Now Streaming – only on MTV Southeast Asia
- MTV Nu-School – only on MTV Southeast Asia
- MTV Nusantara Hits – only on MTV Southeast Asia
- MTV Offroad – only on MTV Korea
- MTV on the Rock – only on MTV Thailand
- MTV the OPM Show – only on MTV Pinoy
- MTV Party Anthem – only on MTV Vietnam (sorta)
- MTV Partyzone
- MTV PeeP – only on MTV Japan
- MTV Picks – only on MTV Southeast Asia
- MTV Pinoy Pop – only on MTV Pinoy
- MTV Playlist – only on MTV Pinoy
- MTV Pop 10 – only on MTV Southeast Asia
- MTV Pop 20 – only on MTV Southeast Asia
- MTV Pop Inc – only on MTV Southeast Asia
- MTV Powermix – only on MTV Southeast Asia
- MTV Presents
- MTV Presents: Bellator on Paramount Channel – only on MTV Southeast Asia
- MTV Quick Fix – only on MTV Southeast Asia
- MTV Reality Stars
- MTV Recommends – only on MTV Southeast Asia
- MTV Requested with Wiqar Ali Khan – only on MTV Pakistan
- MTV Reverb – only on MTV Southeast Asia
- MTV Riccanza World
- MTV Roadies – in India
- MTV Rock It
- MTV Rock'd
- MTV Rocks – only on MTV Pakistan & MTV Southeast Asia
- MTV Rumah Gue – only on MTV Indonesia
- MTV School Attack – only on MTV Korea
- MTV Screen – only on MTV China; co-host by VJ Chinese; relay from Channel 9
- MTV Sessions
- The MTV Show
- MTV Siesta – only on MTV Philippines
- MTV Slightly Off – only on MTV Pakistan
- MTV Sound Check – only on MTV India
- MTV Spankin' New – only on MTV Southeast Asia
- MTV Special – only on MTV Southeast Asia
- MTV Spinn – only on MTV Thailand
- MTV Sports
- MTV Splitsvilla – only on MTV India
- MTV Sunny Side – only on MTV Korea
- MTV Sunrise Tune – only on MTV Japan
- MTV Sunset Tune – only on MTV Japan
- MTV Supahstar – only on MTV Philippines
- MTV Super Select – only on MTV India
- MTV Style Check – only on MTV India
- MTV Swag – only on MTV Southeast Asia
- MTV Syok – only on MTV Southeast Asia
- MTV Tech Check – only on MTV India
- MTV Tell Me the Truth – only on MTV Korea
- MTV Thailand Hitlist – only on MTV Thailand
- MTV Thích Mê – only on MTV Vietnam
- MTV Top 10 Favourite Videos
- MTV Top 10 with Wiqar – only on MTV Pakistan
- MTV Top Choice – only on MTV Korea
- MTV Top 100 Hits of 2008
- MTV Top Hits – only on MTV Indonesia
- MTV Triple Play – only on MTV Southeast Asia
- MTV Twisted
- MTV U-Break – only on MTV Philippines
- MTV U Made –only on MTV Thailand
- MTV Ultrasound
- MTV Ultimate – only on MTV Korea
- MTV Upgraded
- MTV Urban Beats
- MTV Urban Hits – only on MTV Vietnam
- MTV Usil – only on MTV Indonesia
- MTV Vaults
- MTV Videosomnia
- MTV Wanna Be – only on MTV Pakistan
- MTV Webbed – Kritika Kamra
- MTV Weekend – only on MTV Indonesia
- MTV Weekends
- MTV What the Hack! – only on MTV India; co-hosted by VJ Jose & Ankit Fadia
- MTV What's Up – only on MTV Indonesia
- MTV Whatever Things
- MTV World Chart Express – only on MTV India & MTV Philippines
- MTV Wonder Girls – only on MTV Korea
- MTV Wow – only on MTV Indonesia
- MTV Zipper – only on MTV Indonesia
- MTV's Busted
- Music Non-Stop
- My Big Fat Fabulous Wedding
- My Celeb MTV
- My Dream D8
- My MTV
- My Own
- My Super Sweet 16

== N ==
- Newlyweds: Nick and Jessica
- Newport Harbor
- News Presents
- Ngedate-in Bonyok – only on MTV Indonesia
- Ngibul – only on MTV Indonesia
- Nick Cannon Presents: Short Circuitz
- Nitro Circus
- Noise From The Hood – only on MTV Southeast Asia
- Non Stop Hits Dangdut & Hindies – only on MTV Indonesia
- Non Stop Hits Lokal – only on MTV Indonesia
- Nongkrong Bareng – only on MTV Indonesia

== O ==
- OG Hits – only on MTV Southeast Asia
- OG OK Karaoke – only on MTV Southeast Asia
- OK Karaoke – only on MTV Southeast Asia
- OK K-Wave Karaoke – only on MTV Southeast Asia
- OK Danceoke – only on MTV Southeast Asia & China
- Onboard @ MTV – only on MTV Southeast Asia
- One Bad Trip
- One More Time – only on MTV Korea
- OnlyOneOf: Unlocking Love – only on MTV Korea & MTV Southeast Asia
- The Osbournes

== P ==
- Para Bos! – only on MTV Philippines
- Past Video Music Awards – only on MTV Southeast Asia
- Paris Hilton's Dubai BFF
- Paris Hilton's My New BFF
- The Pauly D Project
- The Playlist – only on MTV Philippines
- Pimp My Car – only on MTV Indonesia
- Pimp My Ride
- Pimp My Ride UK
- Pimp My Ride International
- Plain Jane
- Plan V Diary – only on MTV Korea
- Pop Style – only on MTV Indonesia
- PoP vs. Rock Weekend
- PoweR Girls
- Promposal
- Punk'd
- Pranked
- Pretty Little Liars
- Primetime Hits
- Push

== R ==
- The Real World
- Retrosexual – only on MTV Korea
- Return of the Boy Band
- Revenge Prank
- Rex in the City
- Rich Girls
- Road Rules
- Rob & Big
- Robo Robo Popcorn – only on MTV Korea
- Rockola – only on MTV Philippines
- Roll Out – only on MTV Philippines
- Rookie King: Bangtan – only on MTV Korea
- Rookie King: UNVS – only on MTV Korea and MTV Southeast Asia
- Room 401
- Room Raiders
- Rouge
- Run's House
- Running Man – only on MTV Korea and MTV Southeast Asia

== S ==
- Safeword
- Salam Dangdut
- Say What – only on MTV Southeast Asia
- SBS MTV Diary – only on MTV Korea
- SBS MTV K-Pop 20 – only on MTV Korea
- SBS MTV Pop 20 – only on MTV Korea
- SBS MTV The Show
- SBS MTV Sunny Side – only on MTV Korea
- Scandalicious
- Scarred
- School Attack – only on MTV Korea
- Score
- Scream Queens
- Scrubbing In
- Senseless
- Seoul Sunday
- Sex With Mom And Dad
- Shibuhara Girls
- The Shop
- A Shot at Love with Tila Tequila
- The Show: All New K-Pop – only on MTV Korea
- Shuga
- Siesta Key
- Singled Out
- Sing MTV – only on MTV Southeast Asia
- Single AF
- Skins
- Sleeping with the Family
- Slips
- Snack-Off
- Snooki & Jwoww
- Sorority Life
- South Park – only on VH1 India
- Speed Wild Story – only on MTV Korea
- SpongeBob SquarePants – only on MTV Korea
- Spring Break With Grandad
- The Secret Life of Suckers – only on MTV India
- The Stage – only on MTV Korea
- The Stage: Big Pleasure – only on MTV Korea
- Star Beauty Show (season 2) – only on MTV Korea
- StarStalking – only on MTV Korea
- Strictly Confidential – only on MTV Pakistan
- Style Guru – only on MTV Pakistan
- Stylissimo – only on MTV Southeast Asia
- Subterranean – only on MTV Philippines
- Suka Suka Gue – only on MTV Indonesia
- Sunny Side Up – only on MTV Southeast Asia
- Supermodel 2017 – only on MTV Southeast Asia & MTV Korea
- Superock
- Super Show 4 in Seoul 3D – only on MTV Korea

== T ==
- Ta-Dah! It's... – only on MTV Korea
- Taildaters
- Taking the Stage
- Taquita + Kaui
- Teen Cribs
- Teen Mom
- Teen Top's Wake Up – only on MTV Korea
- Tempura – only on MTV Japan
- Tamu Istimewa – only on MTV Indonesia
- Thần Tượng Đột Kích – only on MTV Vietnam
- 'Till Death Do Us Part
- There & Back
- Tiara Girls
- Ticket To VH1
- Time's Up
- That's Amore!
- TLC – only on MTV China
- The Tom Green Show
- Tong Hits – only on MTV Philippines
- Top Hits – only on MTV Indonesia
- Total Request – only on MTV Indonesia
- Total Request Live (TRL)
- Travel at Home – only on MTV Korea & MTV Southeast Asia
- Treasure Map – only on MTV Korea & MTV Southeast Asia
- Trendspotting – only on MTV Southeast Asia
- Trick It Out – only on MTV Philippines
- Trip to K-Pop – only on MTV Korea & MTV Southeast Asia
- Trippin'
- True Life
- True Life Crime

== U ==
- UK Top 10 – only on MTV Southeast Asia
- Urban Hits – only on MTV China
- Urban Beats – only on MTV Southeast Asia & Indonesia
- Underemployed
- Urban Countdown – only on MTV Southeast Asia
- Usavich

== V ==
- Valemont
- The Valleys
- VH1 Absolute Divas – only on VH1 Indonesia
- VH1 After 2000 – only on VH1 Indonesia
- VH1: All Access
- VH1 Band It Like – only on VH1 Indonesia
- VH1 Best Mix – only on VH1 Indonesia
- VH1 Cardio Videos – only on VH1 India
- VH1 Dance 101 – only on VH1 India
- VH1 Dance Floor – only on VH1 Indonesia
- VH1 Divas – only on VH1 India
- VH1 Down Tempo – only on VH1 Thailand
- VH1 Favorite – only on VH1 Indonesia
- VH1 From Flab to Fab
- VH1 Get With In – only on VH1 India
- VH1 Greatest Love Song – only on VH1 Indonesia
- VH1 Hip Hop Hustle – only on VH1 India
- VH1 Hit Factory – only on VH1 Thailand
- VH1 Hits
- VH1 Left Centre – only on VH1 India
- VH1 Legendary Albums – only on VH1 Indonesia
- VH1 Love Is... – only on VH1 India
- VH1 Movie Collector – only on VH1 Indonesia
- VH1 Playlist – only on VH1 India
- VH1 Rock – only on VH1 Indonesia
- VH1 Rock Rules – only on VH1 India
- VH1 SoulStage
- VH1 Sound of 80's 90's – only on VH1 Indonesia
- VH1 Time Machine – only on VH1 Indonesia
- VH1 Top 10 Classics – only on VH1 Indonesia
- VH1 Upbeat – only on VH1 Thailand
- VH1 Video Collection
- VH1 Zodiac – only on VH1 Indonesia
- Video Love
- Vidiots
- Viet Must – only on MTV Vietnam
- Viral Mix – only on MTV Southeast Asia
- Viva La Bam
- Viral Countdown – only on MTV Southeast Asia
- VJ Camp – only on MTV Vietnam
- Vomiting – only on VH1 Philippines

== W ==
- The Wade Robson Project
- WakeBrothers
- Wake Up Call – only on MTV Indonesia
- Wake Up MTV! – only on MTV Japan
- Wanna Come In?
- Washington Heights
- We Heart Music Videos – only on MTV Southeast Asia
- Weekend – only on MTV Indonesia
- Weekend Break – only on MTV Thailand
- What the Hack – only on MTV India; co-hosted by VJ Jose & Ankit Fadia
- What's Up – only on MTV Indonesia
- When I Was 17
- Where My Dogs At?
- White Supremacy Destroyed My Life
- Why Can't I Be You?
- Wildboyz
- Wild 'n Out
- Winter Break: Hunter Mountain
- Winning Show – only on MTV Korea
- Wiqar Is MTV Style Guru – only on MTV Pakistan
- Wonder Boy – only on MTV Korea
- World Stage

== X ==
- The X Effect

== Y ==
- Yo! Hip-Hop Hits – only on MTV Southeast Asia
- Yo Momma
- Yo! MTV Raps Asia – only on MTV Southeast Asia
- Young and Married
- YTN Starnews – only on MTV Korea

== See also ==
- MTV Asia
- MTV Philippines
- MTV Pinoy
- MTV Indonesia
- MTV Thailand
- MTV India
- MTV Pakistan
- MTV Japan
- MTV Mandarin
- MTV Korea
