= List of programmes broadcast by MTV (India) =

This is a list of television programmes broadcast by MTV India.

== Currently broadcast ==
- Brave Combat Federation (2018–)
- La Liga (2021–)
- MTV Hustle (2019–)
- MTV Roadies (2003–)
- MTV Splitsvilla (2008–)

== Formerly broadcast ==
=== Anthology ===
- MTV Big F (2015–2017)
- MTV Fully Faltoo Films (2008)
- MTV Love on the Run (2017–2018)
- MTV Luv Reel (2010)
- MTV Webbed (2013–2014)
- Road to Love (2012)

=== Comedy ===
- CY vs CY (2004–2005)
- Kaisi Yeh Yaariaan (2014–2015)
- MTV Bajao d (2004–2005)
- MTV Bakra (1999–2005)
- MTV Heavy Metal (2004–2005)
- MTV Kahani Mein Twist (2013–2014)
- Pyaar Vyaar and All That (2005–2006)
- MTV Reality Stars (2013)
- Zubaan Pe Lagaam (2008)

=== Drama ===
- Bring on the Night (2012)
- Haunted Weekends with Sunny Leone (2014)
- Kitni Mast Hai Zindagi (2004–2005)
- MTV Fanaah (2014–2015)
- MTV Girls on Top (2016)
- MTV Nishedh (2020–2022)
- Traffic: An MTV EXIT Special (2014)
- Warrior High (2015)

=== Sports/MMA ===
- Box Cricket League (2018–2019)
- EFL Cup (2018)
- International Premier Kabaddi League (2019)
- Super Fight League (2014–2017)

=== Reality/unscripted ===
- The Anti Social Network (2019)
- Bacardi Music CDs Legacy Competition (2015)
- Captain Shack (2012)
- Coke Studio @ MTV (2011–2015)
- The Dewarists (2011–2013)
- Drive with MTV (2014)
- Elovator Pitch (2019)
- Fame Gurukul @ MTV (2005)
- India's Next Top Model (2015–2018)
- The Junkyard Project (2016)
- Match India Poker League (2017–2019)
- Miss Teen India (2008)
- MTV Ace of Space (2018–2019)
- MTV Ace of Quarantine (2020)
- MTV Angels of Rock (2016)
- MTV Anything For Love (2021–2022)
- MTV Aquanoon party (2013)
- MTV Bigg Boss- Extra Dose (2017–2018)
- MTV Chase the Monsoon (2013–2017)
- MTV Campus Diaries (2013–2016)
- MTV Connected (2009)
- MTV Date to Remember (2018)
- MTV Dark Scroll (2024)
- MTV Dating in the Dark (2018)
- MTV Dropout Pvt Ltd. (2017)
- MTV Ex or Next (2022)
- MTV Fabulous Lives (2008–2009)
- MTV Fame Istaan (2017)
- MTV Fanta Fantastic Five (2008–2009)
- MTV Force India The Fast and The Gorgeous (2009)
- MTV GTalk (2008–2009)
- MTV GateCrash (2012)
- MTV Girls Night Out (2010)
- MTV Gyaando (2014)
- MTV Jhand Hogi Sab Ki (2014)
- MTV Junk Yard Project (2016)
- MTV Loveline (1999)
- MTV Love School (2015–2019)
- MTV Making The Cut (2010)
- MTV Pantaloons Style Super Stars (2019–2020)
- MTV Rann VJ Run (2013)
- MTV Rock On (2009–2010)
- MTV Sound Trippin (2012)
- MTV Stuntmania (2009–2010)
- MTV Supermodel of the Year (2019–2021)
- MTV Trackstar (2016)
- MTV Troll Police (2018)
- MTV True Life (2011)
- MTV Unplugged (2011–2019)
- MTV VJ Hunt (2002)
- MTV’s Video Ga Ga in 2003. (2003)
- Nokia Music Theatre (2012)
- Quikr Chronicles (2014)
- Time Out With Imam (2013)
- U Cypher (2018)
- Ultimate Fitness Fan (2014)
- VJ Chronicles (2015)

=== Variety shows ===
- Club MTV (1997)
- MTV 123 (1998–1999)
- MTV Chill out (1998–1999)
- MTV Grind (1996–1998)
- MTV Gone in 60 Seconds (2009)
- MTV Land (1996–1998)
- MTV Made in India(1996–1998)
- MTV Most Wanted (1998–1999)
- MTV Mute (2009)
- MTV Recycled(1997–1998)
- MTV School of Grooming (2017)
- MTV Samachar (2009)
- MTV Stripped (2009)
- MTV Style Check (2002)
- MTV U(1997–1998)
- MTV Wassup – Voice of Youngistaan (2008–2010)
- MTV What the Hack! (2009–2010)
- MTV'S Hipshakers (1999)
- Silly Point (2012)
