= Marco Restrepo =

American singer-songwriter

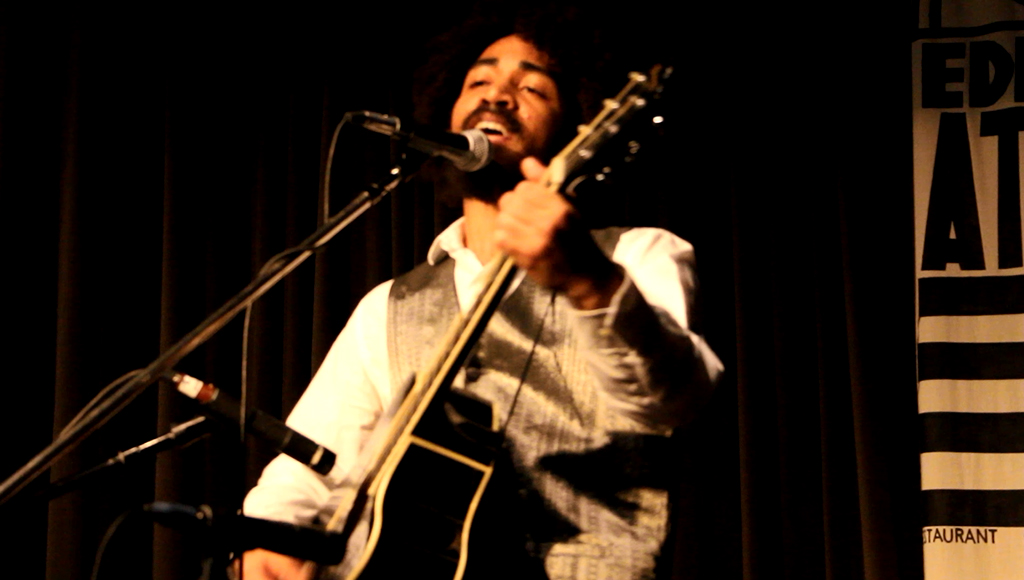
- Marco Restrepo performing at Eddie's Attic in 2014

Background information
- Born: Marco Antonio Restrepo; October 22, 1989 (age 37); Marietta, Georgia
- Origin: Atlanta, Georgia
- Genres: Alternative rock; pop rock; hip hop
- Occupations: Musician; singer-songwriter
- Instruments: Guitar; vocals; bass; drums; keyboards
- Years active: 2007-present
- Label: Farsyde Entertainment
- Website: marcorestrepo.com

Marco Restrepo (born Marco Antonio Restrepo, October 22, 1989) is an American singer-songwriter, multi-instrumentalist and producer. He is best known for his single "Get Up & Go", recorded under A.Tone Da Priest, which has been featured on MTV programs Scrubbing In (TV series) and Follow the Rules. He has since focused on more rock oriented material under his given name. His style has been described as "highly melodic", "sing songy rock funk", or self-described by Restrepo as "riff driven moon rock".

== Life and career ==
Marco Restrepo was born in Marietta, Georgia, and raised in Atlanta, Georgia. He grew up listening to Jackie Wilson, other Motown acts and commercial radio. During high school he adopted the name A.Tone Da Priest and began rapping with friend Sean Spellz in a group called 1Up. He began self-producing material in 2006 and eventually put out his first mixtape online titled Still A Rapper Pt. 1.

While a senior at Chamblee Charter High School in 2007, a recommendation from hip hop production team J.U.S.T.I.C.E. League, landed him an internship at a premier Atlanta recording studio. There he learned how to record and engineer and began to take his craft more seriously. Since that time, he released one EP and four full-length albums, The Address EP (2011), Stand By My Words (2011), The Fi King (2012), October Sky (2012), and Come Fly With Me (2013), under his A.Tone moniker.

In 2012, bored with rap music and looking for new outlets, Restrepo taught himself how to play guitar and began incorporating it into his music. The Fi King and October Sky would both prove to be guitar heavy albums. Soon however he shifted focus from his rap persona and began working on material under his birth name, Marco Restrepo.

In late 2014/early 2015, Restrepo released two albums, 1989 (2014) and Lonely Hearts Club (2015). He took on the task of playing all of the instruments featured on the projects. He was credited with guitar, bass, drums, keyboards and percussion. Although general consensus of his new material was positive and even at times boastful of his genius and originality, he was criticized for his "garage band sound" which some critics felt held him back from his full potential. In the summer of 2015, he announced that two LP's titled Promised Land and Change were in the works.

Restrepo has long been a content creator on YouTube for his material and has gained well over a million views cumulatively across his many videos and channels. His first national break occurred in 2014 when his song "Get Up & Go" from his Stand By My Words album was featured on a short lived MTV series called Scrubbing In (TV series) and again in 2015 on a reality show about rapper Ja Rule's family life called Follow the Rules.

== Style ==
Restrepo has mentioned Sum 41, Nirvana, The Beatles, Nick Drake, Buddy Holly, Eazy-E and T.I. as favorite artists. His compositions have spanned from southern style conscious rap works to his newer instrument based material which reviewers describe as "new age psychedelic rock". His music overall is said to be "an unobstructed view into the heart of an artist who embraces each moment".

== Personal life ==
In 2012 Restrepo graduated from Georgia State University in Atlanta with a bachelor's degree in Marketing. He is the nephew of The Detroit Cobras long tenured guitarist Mary Ramirez.

== Discography ==
A.Tone Da Priest

- The Address EP (2011)
- Stand By My Words (2011)
- The Fi King (2012)
- October Sky (2012)
- Come Fly With Me (2013)

Marco Restrepo

- 1989 (2014)
- Lonely Hearts Club (2015)
