= MTV Nishedh =

- Genre: Drama
- Based on: MTV Shuga
- Written by: Season 3: Sulagna Chatterjee, Angelene Kaur, Aditya Mandhane
- Directed by: Victor Mukherjee
- Starring: See below
- Theme music composer: Chirrantan Bhatt
- Opening theme: "Khul Ke Bol"
- Country of origin: India
- Original language: Hindi
- No. of seasons: 3
- No. of episodes: 32

Production
- Producer: Chris Wilson
- Cinematography: Hanoz Kerawala
- Camera setup: Multi-camera
- Running time: 23 minutes
- Production company: Victor Tango Entertainment Pvt. Ltd.

Original release
- Network: MTV India
- Release: 25 January 2020 – 23 March 2025

MTV Nishedh (transl. Prohibition/Taboo) is an Indian television series that aired on MTV India from 25 January 2020. Nishedh is a remake of the African television series Shuga. The show's core lies in highlighting the importance of dealing with taboos. A second season premiered on 19 November 2022. A third season premiered on YouTube in 2025.

== Cast ==
=== Season 1 ===
- Malhaar Rathod as Astha
- Rajat Verma as Gaurav
- Priya Chauhan as Megha
- Deependra Kumawat as Pankaj
- Chitransh Raj as Mehul
- Ashish Bhatia as Dr. Agarwal
- Sachin Vidrohi as Ajay
- Aanchal Goswami as Prerna
- Asheema Vardaan as Inaaya
- Madhvendra Jha as Papa ji
- Himika Bose as Laxmi
- Diksha Juneja as Jyoti
- Gautam Vig as Raghav
- Ashwin Mushran as Kumar Sukumar
- Shivam Patil as Manav
- Purvesh Pimple as Rohit
- Syed Raza as Vicky
- Akshay Nalawade as Bunty
- Anubha Arora as Riddhi
- Riya Jha as Guddi

=== Season 2 ===
- Asheema Vardaan as Inaaya
- Aaryan Tandon as Pankaj
- Anusubdha Bhagat as Hina
- Rrama Sharma as Sushmita
- Sachin Vidrohi as Ajay
- Aanchal Goswami as Prerna
- Chitransh Raj as Mehul

=== Season 3 ===
- Isha Mate as Kajal
- Sarthak Bhardwaj as Nishant
- Rrama Sharma as Sushmita
- Sachin Vidrohi as Ajay
- Mohit Gupta as Viren
- Deepika as Girija

== Series overview ==
| Season | Episodes | Originally aired | |
| Season | Episodes | First aired | Last aired |
|---|---|---|---|
| 1 | 13 | 25 January 2020 | 7 March 2020 |
| 2 | 10 | 19 November 2022 | TBA |
| 3 | 9 | 18 March 2025 | 23 March 2025 |

== Production ==
=== Development ===
The series was announced in January 2020, consisting of thirteen episodes premiered on MTV India on 25 January 2020.

The second season was announced in November 2022, consisting of ten episodes premiered on MTV India on 19 November 2020.

The third season premiered on YouTube in two volumes released between 18 March 2025 and 23 March 2025.

== Episodes ==
=== Season 1 ===
| Season | Episode | Title | Release date | Ref(s) |
|---|---|---|---|---|
| 1 | 1 | Challenging the Taboo! | 25 January 2020 | |
| 1 | 2 | Turning tides with controversial conversations | 26 January 2020 | |
| 1 | 3 | Fate opens a new gate for Aastha! | 1 February 2020 | |
| 1 | 4 | Aastha's new approach to life! | 2 February 2020 | |
| 1 | 5 | Jyoti confides in Lakshmi | 8 February 2020 | |
| 1 | 6 | Jyoti feels helpless | 9 February 2020 | |
| 1 | 7 | Aastha confronts Manav! | 15 February 2020 | |
| 1 | 8 | Aastha gets a call! | 16 February 2020 | |
| 1 | 9 | Megha takes charge! | 22 February 2020 | |
| 1 | 10 | Riddhi is pregnant! | 23 February 2020 | |
| 1 | 11 | A new roadblock for Manav! | 29 February 2020 | |
| 1 | 12 | Megha supports Venture No.5! | 1 March 2020 | |
| 1 | 13 | Aastha confides in her father! | 7 March 2020 | |

=== Season 2 ===
| Season | Episode | Title | Release date | Ref(s) |
|---|---|---|---|---|
| 2 | 1 | Pehla Din | 19 November 2022 | |
| 2 | 2 | Gandi Baat | 20 November 2022 | |
| 2 | 3 | Pizza Waala | 26 November 2022 | |
| 2 | 4 | TBA | 27 November 2022 | |
| 2 | 5 | TBA | 3 December 2022 | |
| 2 | 6 | TBA | 4 December 2022 | |
| 2 | 7 | TBA | 10 December 2022 | |
| 2 | 8 | TBA | 11 December 2022 | |
| 2 | 9 | TBA | 17 December 2022 | |
| 2 | 10 | TBA | 18 December 2022 | |

== Soundtrack ==
MTV Nishedh

Soundtrack album by Chirrantan Bhatt
- Released: 2020
- Genre: Soundtrack
- Length: 1:50
- Language: Hindi
- Label: Voot
External videos
- "Khul Ke Bol" on YouTube

MTV Nishedh soundtrack is composed by Chirrantan Bhatt. The title song is "Khul Ke Bol" sung by Neeti Mohan.

Tracklisting
| No. | Title | Singer(s) | Length |
|---|---|---|---|
| 1. | "Khul Ke Bol" (Female) | Neeti Mohan | 1:50 |
| Total length: | | | 1:50 |

== See also ==
List of programmes broadcast by MTV (India)
