= Ankit Fadia =

Indian former hacker and writer

- Born: May 24, 1985 (age 41); Delhi, India
- Education: Stanford University (B.S.)
- Occupations: Hacker, author, and television presenter
- Years active: 2000s–present
- Notable work: An Unofficial Guide to Ethical Hacking (2001)
- Television: MTV What the Hack! (2008–2009)

Ankit Fadia (born 24 May 1985) is an Indian former hacker, author, and television host known for his hacking claims and written work, which was later identified as plagiarized. His hacking claims have since been widely discredited by the cybersecurity community and media.

== Life ==
Ankit Fadia was born in Delhi, India. He developed an interest in computer hacking after receiving a computer at age 10 and reading a newspaper article on the topic. He is a graduate of Stanford University, where he studied management science and engineering.

=== Writing career and plagiarism ===
Fadia's writing career began when he founded a website called hackingtruths.box.sk, where he wrote hacking tutorials. At the age of 15, Fadia authored An Unofficial Guide to Ethical Hacking which made him the youngest author published by Macmillan India. Following his initial publication, Fadia wrote additional books on computer security, spoke at seminars across schools and colleges in India, and launched his own training courses, including the "Ankit Fadia Certified Ethical Hacker" (AFCEH) program. However, his work has faced accusations of plagiarism. In 2011, Jericho of attrition.org discovered that two of Ankit Fadia's books were plagiarized from other sources. About half of Network Intrusion Alert and a third of The Unofficial Guide to Ethical Hacking were found to be copied from pre-existing works.

=== Hacking claims ===
Many security and cryptography professionals have characterized Fadia as a self-proclaimed expert whose claims lack substance. Fadia has dismissed the critics who question his credibility as an expert, saying "If I had been fake, my growth would have stopped 10 years ago".

After the September 11 attacks, Fadia claimed that he was hired by a U.S. intelligence agency to decipher Al-Qaeda communications in November 2001. Later, he also claimed to have consulted for India's Central Bureau of Investigation (CBI) on a cybercrime case.

In 2002, Fadia claimed to have defaced the website of the Indian edition of CHIP magazine at age 17, asserting that the editor subsequently offered him a job. However, in 2012, the Forbes India executive editor Charles Assisi, who was the editor of CHIP India at the time, denied that the incident ever occurred after consulting with his predecessor and successor. Fadia also stated in a 2002 interview that a year ago, he had thwarted an attempt by Kashmiri separatist hackers to deface an Indian website. He claimed to have gathered information on the attackers, infiltrated their online chats, and sent the details to a US intelligence agency for which he was working. The name of the organization was not disclosed for security reasons. In response, the Pakistani hacker group Anti-India Crew (AIC) questioned his abilities by hacking the Indian government website epfindia.gov.in and dedicating the defacement to Fadia. AIC also publicly challenged him to prevent them from defacing the CBEC website within two days; Fadia was unsuccessful.

In 2003, Fadia claimed to have infiltrated a hacker group and alleged that Pakistani intelligence agencies were paying "westerners" to deface Indian websites.

In 2009, Fadia stated that he was working as an internet security consultant for "prestigious companies" in New York. He also endorsed the Flying Machine jeans brand of Arvind Mills.

Fadia's own website has been compromised at least nine times despite his claim of being a hacker. After a 2009 defacement, he attributed the breach to a vulnerability in his web host's servers. However, independent security experts contended that the issue was a loophole within his own website's code. His website was also hacked by an Indian hacker, Himanshu Sharma, after accepting a challenge from Fadia. In 2012, Fadia was given a "Security Charlatan of the Year" award at the DEF CON hacking conference. That same year, after Fadia issued a public challenge, a group known as "Team Grey Hat" compromised his personal website on January 7, 2012, and released data obtained from it. His site was also defaced twice by hackers who disputed his claims and accused him of misleading the public.

=== TV host ===
In 2008, Fadia began hosting the television show MTV What the Hack! on MTV India with José Covaco. In 2009, he launched a second show on MTV India, where he answered internet-related questions submitted by viewers.

In 2012, Fadia and Dell India created a video series on computer and mobile phone usage, which was distributed on the Dell India Facebook page. A year later, Fadia started the YouTube show Geek on the Loose in collaboration with PING networks. The show was based on his book.

=== Digital India ambassador appointment controversy ===
In September 2015, a certificate was posted on Fadia's official Facebook page announcing his appointment as a brand ambassador for the Indian Prime Minister's Digital India initiative. This followed a government announcement that it would select young tech entrepreneurs for the role. However, government sources later clarified that there was "no such move to appoint a brand ambassador as reported."
