= Hands on Me =

Hands on Me may refer to:

- Hands on Me (EP) a 2017 EP by Kim Chung-ha
- "Hands on Me" (Vanessa Carlton song), 2007
- "Hands on Me" (Jason Derulo song), 2023
- "Hands on Me", a song by Bobby V from the album The Rebirth, 2009
- "Hands on Me", a song by Ariana Grande from the album My Everything, 2014
- "Hands on Me", a song by Taeyeon from the EP Why, 2016
- "Hands on Me", a 2018 song by Burns
- "Hands on Me", a 2024 song by Ayesha Erotica
- "Hands on Me", a song by Maisie Peters from the Netflix series Nobody Wants This, 2026
