= Rhea Chakraborty =

Indian actress and model

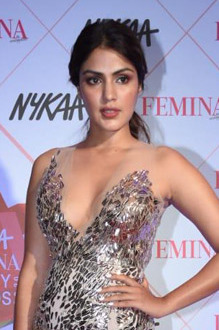
- Chakraborty in 2020
- Born: Bangalore, Karnataka, India
- Occupations: VJ; Actress
- Years active: 2009–present

Rhea Chakraborty (Bengali pronunciation: [rija t͡ʃɔkroboɾti]) is an Indian actress and VJ who primarily appears in Hindi films. She started her career as a VJ on MTV India. She made her acting debut with the 2012 Telugu film Tuneega Tuneega and later appeared in the Hindi film Mere Dad Ki Maruti (2013).

== Early life and education ==
Rhea Chakraborty was born in a Bengali family at Bangalore, Karnataka. Her father was a Lieutenant colonel in the Indian Army. She was educated at Army Public School, Ambala Cantt, Ambala, and at St. Clare's School, Agra.

== Career ==
Rhea started her television career in 2009 with MTV India's TVS Scooty Teen Diva where she was the first runner-up. She later auditioned to be a VJ at MTV Delhi and was selected. She has hosted several MTV shows, including Pepsi MTV Wassup, TicTac College Beat and MTV Gone in 60 Seconds.

In 2012, she made her film debut with the Telugu film Tuneega Tuneega where she played the character Nidhi. In 2013, she debuted in Bollywood with Mere Dad Ki Maruti as Jasleen. In 2014, she played the character of Sonali in Sonali Cable.

In 2017 she appeared in YRF's Bank Chor. She also made cameo appearances in Half Girlfriend and Dobaara: See Your Evil. In 2018, she appeared in Jalebi opposite debutante Varun Mitra.

She topped the list of The Times of India's "Most Desirable Women" in 2020. In 2023, Chakraborty served as a gang leader on the twentieth season of Indian reality show MTV Roadies where she emerged as the winning gang leader.

In 2026, it was announced that Chakraborty would return to acting after a 7-year gap in the Netflix show Family Business.

== Personal life ==
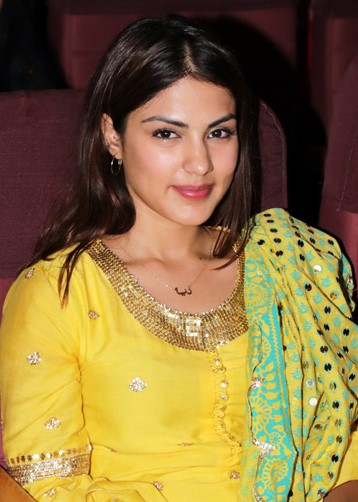
Chakraborty in 2018

Chakraborty started dating actor Sushant Singh in April 2019. The couple moved in together in December 2019. On 14 June 2020, Rajput died by suicide at his home in Bandra, Mumbai, six days after she moved out.

=== Death of Sushant Singh Rajput ===
On 25 July, Rajput's family lodged a first information report (FIR) with Patna Police, where his father lives, alleging Chakraborty and several others of abetment of suicide, wrongful restraint, wrongful confinement, theft, criminal breach of trust, and cheating under various sections of the IPC. Rajput's father said in the FIR that Rajput had confided to his sister about Chakraborty threatening to make his medical receipts public and prove him mad; that Rajput was afraid Chakraborty would frame him for his secretary's suicide; and that before his day of suicide, Chakraborty took away all doctor's receipts. On 7 August, the Enforcement Directorate (ED) questioned Chakraborty and her brother over allegations of money laundering. On 19 August, the Supreme Court of India allowed the CBI to take control of the investigation. The Narcotics Control Bureau (NCB), India's national drug law enforcement agency, arrested Chakraborty on 8 September, charging that she and her brother had caused marijuana to be supplied to Rajput.

On 6 October, Mumbai Sessions Court extended Chakraborty's judicial remand until 20 October, but a day later she was granted bail by the Bombay High Court. "Since she has no criminal antecedents," the high court ruled, "there are reasonable grounds for believing that she is not likely to commit any offence while on bail." Moreover, the high court rejected the NCB's theory that Chakraborty had harboured and financed Rajput's drug addiction, finding instead that she was not part of the chain of drug dealers involved in the case. "She has not forwarded the drugs allegedly procured by her to somebody else to earn monetary or other benefits," wrote Justice Sarang Kotwal."

In March 2025, the CBI filed a closure report concluding that actor Sushant Singh Rajput's death in June 2020 was a suicide, absolving Rhea Chakraborty and her family of any involvement.

==== Media coverage ====
On 27 August 2020, BBC News reported that in the wake of Rajput's death, Chakraborty had "found herself at the centre of a vicious hate campaign led by some of India's most high-profile journalists and social media trolls." Subjected to gossip, innuendo, and misogynistic abuse, she was described by conservative television hosts as a "manipulative" woman who "performed black magic" and "drove Sushant to suicide." After a purported fan of Rajput threatened her on Instagram with rape and murder and urged her to "commit suicide otherwise I will send people to kill you," Chakraborty sought help from the cybercrime police. Supreme Court senior counsel Meenakshi Arora told the BBC that much of the press had already declared the actress guilty. "She's been hanged, drawn and quartered. It's a complete trial by media." Three activists, arguing that trial by media poses "real and substantial risk of prejudice to the proper administration of justice," petitioned the Bombay High Court to restrict reportage that could hamper the investigation of this case due to sensationalisation. News channels named as having conducted such media trials included Times Now, Republic TV, Zee News, News 18, and India Today. On 28 August, the Press Council of India (PCI), the autonomous press watchdog established by parliament, said coverage of the Sushant Singh Rajput case by many media outlets "is in violation of the norms of journalistic conduct." The PCI advised media to not carry out a "parallel trial" by narrating the story to induce public belief in the guilt of one whom the PCI called "the person indicted."

In their September 2020 study "Anatomy of a Rumour: Social media and the suicide of Sushant Singh Rajput", University of Michigan associate professor Joyojeet Pal and colleagues found Indian journalists and media houses "equally complicit in pushing an agenda against Rhea Chakraborty." In particular, during the first month following Rajput's death, news channel Republic TV "pushed insinuations on the finances of Rhea Chakraborty's parents." Over time, the researchers recount, Rhea Chakraborty was slandered, hounded, and "intensely targeted by trolling and mainstream media speculation online." They conclude that "the case and its victims are a reminder of ways the patriarchy is alive and well, and always readying its blades for the next execution."

On 7 October 2020, as Chakraborty was released on bail after nearly a month in pretrial confinement, the South China Morning Post noted that "India's hyperbolic television channels, which have given more airtime to this case than India's battle against Covid-19 and the recent rapes of lower-caste women, labelled Chakraborty a 'murderer'." Variety observed that since Rajput's death, "Indian media, fueled by aggressive television anchors, has worked itself into an unprecedented feeding frenzy." Following Chakraborty's arrest, said Variety, "Haranguing television anchors appointed themselves judge and jury, with daily trials on primetime television." The general audience, Variety added, "appears to be consuming the ongoing drama with relish."

== Filmography ==
=== Films ===
- All films are in Hindi, unless otherwise indicated.

Year	Title	Role	Notes	Ref.
2012	Tuneega Tuneega	Nidhi	Telugu film	
2013	Mere Dad Ki Maruti	Jasleen		
2014	Sonali Cable	Sonali Dattaram Tandel		
2017	Dobaara: See Your Evil	Tanya	Cameo	
2017	Half Girlfriend	Anshika	Cameo	
2017	Bank Chor	Gayatri Ganguli		
2018	Jalebi	Aisha		
2021	Chehre	Anna		

=== Television ===
Year	Title	Role
2009	TVS Scooty Teen Diva	Contestant
2009	Pepsi MTV Wassup	Host
2010	Gone in 60 Seconds	Host
2011	TicTac College Beat	Host
2023	MTV Roadies : Karm Ya Kaand	Winning Gang Leader
2025	MTV Roadies: Double Cross	Gang Leader
2026	The Traitors India	Contestant
