= MTV Top 100 Hits of 2008 =

MTV Asia television show

MTV Top 100 Hits of 2008 is a television show that aired in December 2008 on channel MTV Asia. It showed 100 songs that were most voted in 2008.

On Monday to Friday, it showed 5 songs. On Saturday and Sunday, it showed the 25 songs that were shown during that week.

== Chart ==
Rank	Artist	Song
1	Leona Lewis	Bleeding Love
2	Chris Brown	With You
3	Rihanna	Disturbia
4	Madonna feat Justin Timberlake & Timbaland	4 Minutes
5	The Pussycat Dolls	When I Grow Up
6	Timbaland presents OneRepublic	Apologize
7	Britney Spears	Piece Of Me
8	Jordin Sparks feat Chris Brown	No Air
9	Rihanna	Take A Bow
10	Jonas Brothers	Burnin' Up
11	Daughtry	What About Now
12	Mariah Carey	Touch My Body
13	Secondhand Serenade	Fall For You
14	Paramore	Crushcrushcrush
15	Miley Cyrus	7 Things
16	T.I.	Whatever You Like
17	Leona Lewis	Better In Time
18	The Script	The Man Who Can't Be Moved
19	Colbie Caillat	Bubbly
20	Sara Bareilles	Love Song
21	Carrie Underwood	All-American Girl
22	Britney Spears	Womanizer
23	Carrie Underwood	Ever Ever After
24	Britney Spears	Break The Ice
25	Ne-Yo	Closer
26	Pink	So What
27	Mariah Carey	Bye Bye
28	Colbie Caillat	Realize
29	Chris Brown	Forever
30	Boys Like Girls	Thunder
31	Randy Jackson feat Paula Abdul	Dance Like There's No Tomorrow
32	Avril Lavigne	The Best Damn Thing
33	Jason Mraz	I'm Yours
34	Kat DeLuna feat Elephant Man	Whine Up
35	Ashlee Simpson	Outta My Head (Ay Ya Ya)
36	Delta Goodrem	In This Life
37	Shayne Ward	No U Hang Up
38	David Archuleta	Crush
39	Aly & AJ	Like Whoa
40	Jordin Sparks	Tattoo
41	Jordin Sparks	One Step At A Time
42	Kat DeLuna feat Busta Rhymes	Run The Show
43	Mariah Carey feat T.I.	I'll Be Lovin' U Long Time
44	Katy Perry	Hot n Cold
45	Sugababes	About You Now
46	Vanessa Carlton	Hands On Me
47	Rihanna	Don't Stop The Music
48	Daniel Powter	Next Plane Home
49	Spice Girls	Headlines (Friendship Never Ends)
50	Leona Lewis	Forgive Me
51	Vanessa Carlton	Nolita Fairytale
52	Lil Wayne feat Static Major	Lollipop
53	Coldplay	Viva La Vida
54	Metro Station	Shake It
55	The Pussycat Dolls	I Hate This Part
56	Kelly Clarkson	Don't Waste Your Time
57	Beyoncé	If I Were A Boy
58	Fall Out Boy feat John Mayer	Beat It
59	Alicia Keys	Teenage Love Affair
60	Miley Cyrus	Start All Over
61	Fergie	Clumsy
62	Danity Kane	Damaged
63	Coldplay	Violet Hill
64	KT Tunstall	Saving My Face
65	Danity Kane feat Missy Elliott	Bad Girl
66	Daughtry	Feels Like Tonight
67	Colbie Caillat	The Little Things
68	Delta Goodrem	Believe Again
69	OneRepublic	Say (All I Need)
70	Emmy Rossum	Slow Me Down
71	Enrique Iglesias feat Lil Wayne	Push
72	Natasha Bedingfield	Pocketful Of Sunshine
73	Backstreet Boys	Helpless When She Smiles
74	Paramore	That's What You Get
75	Nicole Scherzinger feat will.i.am	Baby Love
76	Duffy	Warwick Avenue
77	Usher feat Young Jeezy	Love In This Club
78	Plies feat Ne-Yo	Bust It Baby (Part 2)
79	T.I. feat Rihanna	Live Your Life
80	Miranda Cosgrove feat Drake Bell	Leave It All To Me
81	Alicia Keys	Superwoman
82	Panic! at the Disco	Nine In The Afternoon
83	Britney Spears	Gimme More
84	Jesse McCartney	Leavin'
85	Simple Plan	Save You
86	Ashley Tisdale	He Said She Said
87	Ne-Yo	Miss Independent
88	Jonas Brothers	When You Look Me In The Eyes
89	Aly & AJ	Potential Breakup Song
90	OneRepublic	Stop & Stare
91	Usher	Moving Mountains
92	Shayne Ward	Breathless
93	The Click Five	Happy Birthday
94	Jason Mraz	Make It Mine
95	Ashanti	The Way That I Love You
96	Sugababes	Change
97	Flo Rida feat will.i.am	In The Ayer
98	3 Doors Down	It's Not My Time
99	Timbaland feat Keri Hilson & Nicole Scherzinger	Scream
100	Marie Digby	Say It Again
