= MTV Pantaloons Style Super Stars =

- Genre: Reality television; Competition
- Created by: Starsnstripes Pvt. Ltd.
- Directed by: Pushkin Varma
- Presented by: Benafsha Soonawalla
- Judges: Sana Saeed; Arjun Kanungo; Shenaz Treasury; Shruti Seth
- Country of origin: India
- Original languages: English; Hindi
- No. of seasons: 2
- No. of episodes: 9

Production
- Executive producers: Rahul Sheth & Kunal Gavankar
- Running time: 22 minutes

Original release
- Network: MTV India
- Release: 2 February 2019 – 3 January 2020

MTV Pantaloons Style Super Stars is an Indian fashion reality television series that premiered on 2 February 2019 on MTV India. The contestants compete for the title of Pantaloons Next Style Super Stars, providing them with an opportunity to begin their career in the fashion industry. The series is hosted by Benafsha Soonawalla, judged by Sana Saeed, Shruti Seth and Arjun Kanungo.

The show returned for its second season on 6 December 2019 and was directed by Pushkin Varma

== Host and Judges ==
Host/Judges	Season 1	Season 2
Benafsha Soonawalla	Host	
Sana Saeed	Judge	
Arjun Kanungo	Judge	
Shruti Seth	Judge	
Shenaz Treasury		Judge

== Season Details ==
Season	Premiere date	End date	No. of episodes	No. of contestants	Winner	Runner-up
1	2 February 2019	23 February 2019	4	7	Amar Ojha	Anusha Arora
2	6 December 2019	3 January 2020	5	9	Prakhar Narayan	Srijita Ghosh

== Season 1 ==
=== Contestants ===
Seven finalists were chosen from several auditions from around India - Lucknow, Ahmedabad, Pune, Delhi, Mumbai, Indore and Dehradun.

Name	Hometown	Finish	Outcome
Amar Ojha	Goa	Episode 4	Winner
Anusha Arora	Indore	Episode 4	Runner-up
Sneha Ramdeo	Ahmedabad	Episode 3	Eliminated
Aaryan Goel	Kanpur	Episode 2	Eliminated
Sharmishtha Chatterjee	Dehradun	Episode 2	Eliminated
Nishtha Pathak	Delhi	Episode 1	Eliminated
Rahul Hazari	Pune	Episode 1	Eliminated

=== Episode summary ===
	Episode 1		Episode 2		Episode 3	Episode 4
Category	Top Job		Gala Dinner		Wildlife Safari	Freshers Party
Budget	₹6000					₹10000
Time	30 minutes					40 minutes
Description	Aaryan	Actor	Rahul	To take away Aaryan's Shoes	-	Transforming their dates for the Freshers Party.
Description	Amar	Teacher	Rahul	To take away Aaryan's Shoes	-	Transforming their dates for the Freshers Party.
Description	Anusha	Gym Trainer	Rahul	To take away Aaryan's Shoes	-	Transforming their dates for the Freshers Party.
Description	Nishtha	Banker	Rahul	To take away Aaryan's Shoes	-	Transforming their dates for the Freshers Party.
Description	Nishtha	Banker	Nishtha	To take away Sharmishtha's; Hair Clutcher	-	Transforming their dates for the Freshers Party.
Description	Rahul	Wedding Planner	Nishtha	To take away Sharmishtha's; Hair Clutcher	-	Transforming their dates for the Freshers Party.
Description	Sharmishtha	Media Professional	Nishtha	To take away Sharmishtha's; Hair Clutcher	-	Transforming their dates for the Freshers Party.
Description	Sneha	Cabin Crew	Nishtha	To take away Sharmishtha's; Hair Clutcher	-	Transforming their dates for the Freshers Party.
Showcase Guest	N/A		Rashmeet Kaur		Nikhita Gandhi	Arjun Kanungo
Fashion Influencer	N/A				Manu Sharma	N/A

=== Call-out Order ===
Order	Episode 1	Episode 2	Episode 3	Episode 4
1	Sneha	Amar	Anusha	Amar
2	Amar	Anusha	Amar	Anusha
3	Anusha	Sneha	Sneha	
4	Sharmishtha	Sharmishtha; Aaryan		
5	Aaryan	Sharmishtha; Aaryan		
6	Nishtha; Rahul			
7	Nishtha; Rahul			

The contestant was eliminated
The contestant won the competition

== Season 2 ==
=== Contestants ===
Nine finalists were chosen from several auditions from around India - Pune, Kolkata, Lucknow, Ahmedabad, Delhi, Mumbai, Indore and Dehradun.

Name	Age	Hometown	Finish	Result
Prakhar Narayan	24	Lucknow	Episode 4	Winner
Srijita Ghosh	22	Kolkata	Episode 4	Runner-up
Ekanshi Singhal	22	Ahmedabad	Episode 4	Eliminated
Sanjay Negi	23	Mumbai	Episode 3	Eliminated
Himanshu More	18	Pune	Episode 2	Eliminated
Punam Sinha	25	Mumbai	Episode 2	Eliminated
Khushbu Sharma	26	Delhi	Episode 1	Eliminated
Piyush Manwani	20	Indore	Episode 1	Eliminated
Umang Thareja	26	Bengaluru	Episode 1	Eliminated

=== Episode Summary ===
	Episode 1		Episode 2		Episode 3	Episode 4	Episode 5
Guest Task Querator	Urvi Shetty; Winner of India's Next Top Model		Krissann Barretto; Actress & Reality Star		Nidhi Singh; Actress	Anusha Dhandekar; Model	Recap & Journey; Episode
Challenge	Absolute Attitude		After Party Photoshoot		Win it by Minute	Future Fashion; Photoshoot	Recap & Journey; Episode
Challenge	Create Profile Introduction of 5-10 minute Vlog with Style & Attitude.		Each Team had to style themselves & 2 other models.		Based on the theme, each contestant had to create 5 looks layered on each other in 1 minute.	The Finalists had to create 2 Futuristic Looks.	Recap & Journey; Episode
Description	Piyush	Yellow Background	Ekanshi	Team Sanjay	1. Airport Look	N/A	Recap & Journey; Episode
Description	Himanshu	Yellow Background	Ekanshi	Team Sanjay	1. Airport Look	N/A	Recap & Journey; Episode
Description	Sanjay	Yellow Background	Ekanshi	Team Sanjay	2. Brunch Look	N/A	Recap & Journey; Episode
Description	Sanjay	Yellow Background	Punam	Team Sanjay	2. Brunch Look	N/A	Recap & Journey; Episode
Description	Prakhar	Pink Background	Punam	Team Sanjay	2. Brunch Look	N/A	Recap & Journey; Episode
Description	Umang	Pink Background	Punam	Team Sanjay	3. Gym Look	N/A	Recap & Journey; Episode
Description	Umang	Pink Background	Prakhar	Team Srijita	3. Gym Look	N/A	Recap & Journey; Episode
Description	Khushbu	Pink Background	Prakhar	Team Srijita	4. Date Look	N/A	Recap & Journey; Episode
Description	Srijita	Blue Background	Prakhar	Team Srijita	4. Date Look	N/A	Recap & Journey; Episode
Description	Srijita	Blue Background	Himanshu	Team Srijita	4. Date Look	N/A	Recap & Journey; Episode
Description	Punam	Blue Background	Himanshu	Team Srijita	5. Party Look	N/A	Recap & Journey; Episode
Description	Ekanshi	Blue Background	Himanshu	Team Srijita	5. Party Look	N/A	Recap & Journey; Episode
Time Limit	5 minutes		N/A		1 minute	N/A	Recap & Journey; Episode
Guest Judge	Urvi Shetty		Gaelyn Mendonca		none	Anusha Dhandekar	Recap & Journey; Episode
Absent Judge	Shenaz Treasury		Arjun Kanungo		none	none	Recap & Journey; Episode

=== Contestant Summary ===
Contestant	Episode 1	Episode 2	Episode 3	Episode 4	Episode 5
Prakhar	SAFE	SAFE	HIGH	Winner	Guest
Srijita	HIGH	SAFE	WIN	Runner-up	Guest
Ekanshi	BTM4	SAFE	BTM2	Eliminated	Guest
Sanjay	WIN	SAFE	ELIM		Guest
Himanshu	SAFE	ELIM			Guest
Punam	SAFE	ELIM			Guest
Khushbu	ELIM				Guest
Piyush	ELIM				Guest
Umang	ELIM				Guest

The contestant won.
The contestant was the runner-up.
The contestant was eliminated during the final.
The contestant won the challenge.
The contestant was 2nd best in the challenge.
The contestant was saved by the Judges.
The contestant was in the bottom.
The contestant was eliminated.
The contestant returned as a guest for journey episode.
