= Sonali Cable =

2014 film directed by Charudutt Acharya

- Theatrical release poster
- Directed by: Charudutt Acharya
- Written by: Charudutt Acharya
- Produced by: Ramesh Sippy; Rohan Sippy; Kamia Mulhotra; Roopa De Chouodhury
- Starring: Rhea Chakraborty; Ali Fazal; Raghav Juyal; Anupam Kher; Smita Jaykar; Mrigendra narayan Konwar
- Cinematography: Sudheer Palsane
- Edited by: Aarif Sheikh
- Music by: Daniel B. George; Mikey McCleary; Amjad Nadeem; Raghav Sachar
- Release date: 17 October 2014
- Running time: 120 mins
- Country: India
- Language: Hindi

Sonali Cable is a 2014 Indian Hindi-language comedy drama film directed by Charudutt Acharya and produced by Ramesh Sippy and Rohan Sippy. The script, penned by Acharya himself, was one of the eight scripts selected for the Mumbai Mantra-Sundance Institute Screenwriters Lab 2012, chosen through an evaluation process of submissions from around the world, including the United States, United Kingdom, Italy, France and Germany. A newcomer, Rhea Chakraborty, has been hired to play a pivotal role. Ali Fazal is paired opposite Rhea while Raghav Juyal makes his acting debut with this film. The film was released on 17 October 2014.

== Plot ==
Set in the cable internet turf war of Mumbai, Sonali Cable is the story of a girl Sonali (Rhea Chakraborty) and her ‘internet boys’, including her brother Sadda who are working in their own internet cable wire shop. One day when a new police station starts in their region Sonali reaches there for giving connection. There she meets her old school friend, now graduated from a university in the U.S., Raghu (Ali Fazal) who remembers her name, and even her roll number 43 while they were studying in school. They fall in love. During that time Sonali faces problems because a big industrial company "Shining" starts providing broadband services. During the Ganapati festival Sonali and Raghu consummate their love. On the same night Sadda, Sonali's brother gets hit by some local goons trying to vandalize their shop. Sadda succumbs to his injuries. Sonali gets determined to take revenge on the company.

Sonali Cable is like a 'David versus Goliath' story, in the thick of the cable internet turf war in Mumbai. At last, Sonali wins the war by spying on the corruption of the people who worked against her. Later, Sonali starts an internet cable shop in the name of her brother Sadda. Raghu joins her in the shop and in her life.

== Cast ==
- Rhea Chakraborty as Sonali Tandel
- Ali Fazal as Raghu Pawar
- Raghav Juyal as Sadaa
- Anupam Kher as Boss-Vaghela, Owner of Sunshine Cable
- Smita Jaykar as Meena Tai Pawar, Raghu's Mother
- Swanand Kirkire as Dattaram Tandel (Baba), Sonali's father
- Savi Sidhu as Falooda Chacha
- Vikas Shrivas as Inspector Gawde
- Arun Bali as Old Sikh gentlemen
- Mrigendra Narayan Konwar as BD
- Muzammil Qureshi as Jayyu
- Faisal Rashid as Bobby
- Gabriella Demetriades as Zooni

== Soundtrack ==
The album is released on 9 September 2014.

Track listing
No.	Title	Lyrics	Music	Singer(s)	Length
1.	"EK Mulaqat"	Sameer Anjaan	Amjad – Nadeem	Jubin Nautiyal	05:18
2.	"Gannu Rocks"	Kausar Munir	Mikey McCleary	Vishal Dadlani & Anmol Malik	03:42
3.	"Cheenti Cheenti Bang Bang"	Charudutt Acharya	Daniel B. George	Manish J. Tipu, Sayantani Das	02:51
4.	"Mausam Yeh Kyun Badal Gaya"	Kumaar	Raghav Sachar	Kshitij Tarey	03:47
5.	"Sapney Apney"	Kausar Munir	Daniel B. George	Neeti Mohan	03:27
6.	"Sikkay"	Swanand Kirkire	Amjad-Nadeem	Amitabh Narayan	04:06
7.	"EK Mulaqat (Reprise)"	Sameer Anjaan	Amjad-Nadeem	Altamash Faridi	05:13
8.	"EK Mulaqat (Unplugged)"	Sameer Anjaan	Amjad-Nadeem	Jubin Nautiyal	05:13
Total length:					29:20

== Critical reception ==
Sonali Cable received mixed reviews from critics.. India today opined that it had a "confused story line" and an "average music".
