= Flat 211 =

FLAT 211
- Release poster
- Directed by: Sunil Sanjan
- Written by: Sunil Sanjan; Ravi Kaiwart
- Screenplay by: Sunil Sanjan; Ravi Kaiwart
- Produced by: Sunil Sanjan
- Starring: Jayesh Raj; Sonal Singh
- Cinematography: Jaffer Shadiq; Ravi Ranjan
- Edited by: Sunil Sanjan; Dileep Prasad
- Music by: Prakash Prabhakar
- Production company: Ajha Global Entertainment
- Distributed by: Ajha Global Entertainment
- Release date: 2 June 2017
- Running time: 145 minutes
- Country: India
- Language: Hindi

FLAT 211 is a 2017 Indian mystery suspense film produced and directed by Sunil Sanjan. The film features new cast from the TV and theatre world. It tells about an incident inside a flat numbered 211. The film was released on 2 June 2017.

== Plot ==
An incident occurs at Flat 211 and the characters connected to this flat get involved in the incident leading to a mess. The mysterious identity of the person responsible for the incident grows leading to a dramatic turn of events. The film revolves around a murder mystery.

== Cast ==
- Sonal Singh
- Jayesh Raj
- Digvijay Singh
- Samonica Shrivastava
- Gautam Vig as Sameet
- Danish Kohli

== Soundtrack ==
FLAT 211

Soundtrack album by Prakash Prabhakar
- Released: 19 April 2017
- Recorded: 2016–2017
- Genre: Feature film Soundtrack
- Label: Ajha Global Entertainment
- Producer: Sunil Sanjan

Despite new cast, the film was musically big as some of the biggest names from Hindi film industry were part of it i.e. Mika Singh, Harshdeep Kaur, Ash King, Mohammed Irfan (singer), Divya Kumar (singer) and Tarannum Mallik. There are total 5 songs in the film plus 2 unplugged versions. Initial music launch was done on 19 April 2017.

No.	Title	Lyrics	Music	Singer(s)	Length
1.	"Ek Raat Ki Kaali"	Tanveer Ghazi	Prakash Prabhakar	Banjyotsna Borgohain	2:53
2.	"Ek Raat Ki Kaali (Unplugged)"	Tanveer Ghazi	Prakash Prabhakar	Tarannum Mallik	2:56
3.	"Chocolatey Cake"	Tanveer Ghazi	Prakash Prabhakar	Ash King	3:12
4.	"Tere Lams Ne"	Tanveer Ghazi	Prakash Prabhakar	Mohammed Irfan	5:36
5.	"Ek Din Chalegi Saali"	Tanveer Ghazi	Prakash Prabhakar	Divya Kumar	5:20
6.	"Tere Lams Ne (Unplugged)"	Tanveer Ghazi	Prakash Prabhakar	Harshdeep Kaur	5:32
7.	"Crmiminal Akhiyan"	Tanveer Ghazi	Prakash Prabhakar	Mika Singh	3:28

== Awards ==
- Flat 211 is nominated in 'Best Drama Feature' category at Genre Celebration Festival.
- Flat 211 is nominated in 'Best Actress' category at Genre Celebration Festival.
- Flat 211 was nominated as 'Best Film' at Los Angeles Cinefest.
- Flat 211 is FINALIST winner at Red Corner Film Festival.
