= Heroes & Thieves =

Studio album by Vanessa Carlton
- Released: October 9, 2007
- Recorded: 2006 – May 2007
- Genre: Pop rock
- Length: 43:31
- Labels: The Inc.; Universal Motown
- Producers: Irv Gotti, Linda Perry, Stephan Jenkins

Vanessa Carlton chronology
Harmonium (2004)	Heroes & Thieves (2007)	Rabbits on the Run (2011)

Singles from Heroes & Thieves
- 1. "Nolita Fairytale" Released: July 17, 2007; 2. "Hands on Me" Released: February 19, 2008

Heroes & Thieves is the third studio album by American singer-songwriter Vanessa Carlton, released by The Inc. Records on October 9, 2007. It is co-produced by Irv Gotti, Linda Perry and Third Eye Blind lead singer Stephan Jenkins, who produced Carlton's second album, Harmonium (2004), and Carlton co-wrote the tracks with Perry and Jenkins. It is Carlton's only album on The Inc. Records, after Irv Gotti signed her to a record deal there in late 2006, and Gotti has said that Heroes & Thieves is the first album on which he is acting as "co-pilot" rather than "dictator".

The album itself was a commercial failure, becoming her first not to enter the Top 40 of the Billboard 200, selling just over 18,000 copies in its first week of release. As of 2011, the album has sold approximately 75,000 copies in the United States. Due to its commercial failure, the album only spawned two singles. The first, "Nolita Fairytale", was a minor success for Carlton, having some radio success in the United States. The follow-up single, "Hands On Me", was more successful, reaching the Top 40 in Australia, as well as becoming her first song in five years to chart in New Zealand. Although it was a commercial failure in the US, it did receive minimal airplay on mainstream radio.

Despite minimal chart success, the album was a critical success, becoming Carlton's highest rated album on Metacritic, with a 79% approval rate. Allmusic awarded the album three and a half stars, while PopMatters rated the album an eight out of a possible ten. USA Today also praised the album, awarding it three out of four stars. Slant Magazine awarded the album three out of five stars, and the Philadelphia Daily News rated the album at a "B".

== Background ==
In January 2005, two months after the release of Harmonium, Carlton co-wrote three songs with production team The Matrix: "It's Now", "Summer Child" (alternatively titled "Tuesday") and "Underneath". In May 2005, in a post on her official site's forum, Carlton said to her fans that she would be releasing a third album in 2006, although she added "most people will know it as my second!" because of a perceived lack of commitment to Harmonium at her then-current label, A&M Records. During her Harmonium tour, Carlton debuted three new songs in June 2005 at The Living Room in New York City: "Put Your Hands on Me", "This Time" (co-written with Linda Perry) and "The One". (For the release of the album, the title of "Put Your Hands on Me" was shortened to "Hands on Me" because Joss Stone has a song with the original title on her 2007 album, Introducing Joss Stone.) When on tour with rock singer Stevie Nicks in 2005 and 2006, Carlton premiered the songs "Best Behavior" and "All Is Well". (Nicks recorded backing vocals for the track "The One".)

=== Production ===
In August 2005, Carlton said she was to enter the recording studio the following month with producer Linda Perry, with whom she had previously collaborated after executives at A&M Records sent her into the studio to record a second single for Harmonium. Carlton said of the album's creative pulsinator team,

I started enjoying myself with Linda, and not feeling like this was work, but like I was this bohemian artist. The Stephan sessions were super-intensive. He would say, 'Let's do a 50-piece choir here', or, 'I'm just gonna start whistling'. If Irv doesn't like something, he can't fake it, and he has impeccable ears. These people never follow the rules, which is like me. We're all contrarians in our own way.

In December 2005, they completed half the album and experienced what Carlton described as a "whirlwind moment", during which they recorded five songs in two weeks. Carlton said on her website that Perry was "fantastic and genuine and really inspiring". Mastering work on the album was proceeding by February 2006, when Billboard magazine quoted a spokesperson for Carlton as saying that Stephan Jenkins and several "departure producers" had contributed to the album. According to Carlton, she recorded most of the album in a Victorian mansion with Jenkins in San Francisco. She told her fans in September that she was writing songs in the city, and the following month, after signing with The Inc. Records, she said she would return to the studio in Los Angeles to record more songs. The head of The Inc., Irv Gotti, helped to produce the album and said that 7 Aurelius and Rick Rubin would also serve as co-producers, though neither are credited in the album's liner notes.

== Composition ==
According to Carlton, the album is "the best batch of songs I've ever written". She described it as "pretty uplifting" and as having "a lot of layers ... [There are] very complex arrangements but everything just makes me feel good and not in a simplistic way." She also called it her most honest album, and the only one of hers that she considers "a body of work" as opposed to a collection of songs. "I think that shows", she said. "It really does feel like a real album." Carlton says that the concept of the album is "about personal evolution and finding joy through hardships. Every song is like a different chapter in a book". According to her, the lyrics are "far better written" and build on her greater life experience, which she says produces "a more interesting perspective through song" and lyrics more adults can listen to than previously, when she was writing from the point of view of a seventeen-year-old girl rather than "more of a fully formed person".

Carlton said she was inspired by the atmosphere of her New York City loft apartment, including the view from her window, and by her thoughts during long walks around the Nolita neighborhood — "I was very inspired by the vibe here ... There really is a very deep, underlying connection between this space and my record." Another inspiration was metaphors in German fairy tales such as Little Red Riding Hood, the theme of which she said she adapted for the album: "The moral of that story is to never stray from the beaten path or you'll get eaten by a wolf. And, of course, in the past few years, I've really strayed from the beaten path and reaped the rewards. Instead of being eaten by the wolf, I've tamed the wolf, and it does what I say." The album was influenced by Carlton's breakup with its co-producer, Stephan Jenkins, and Carlton said that one of the reasons they remained friends was that "nothing took precedence over the music ... No matter what was going on in the emotional realm, all we cared about was the album. It created this kinetic environment that was kind of like Fleetwood Mac. It made for better music."

Carlton said the song "Nolita Fairytale" is about her life in Nolita, and in her words, "the series of revelations I have had over the past few years." She called the song "Heroes & Thieves" "a song about assessing, to put it in a dramatic way, the Heroes and Thieves in your life"; it is about her personal evolution, and her deciding how she wants to lead her life and the people with whom she wants to share it. The fourth song, "My Best", has been described by Carlton as "one of the most level-headed responses to a broken relationship [...] no matter what crimes are committed in any relationship that fell apart, you kind of always keep your promise to that person, those people in your past. If you were to serendipitously cross paths with them again, you would always be the best version of yourself and offer them your best." The track "The One", which features Stevie Nicks, was inspired by conversations Carlton had with Nicks about relationships and the search for one true love. According to Irv Gotti, the ballad "Home" (which Carlton said she felt sad singing) was written about Stephan Jenkins, Carlton's partner at the time of its writing, although he added that "Vanessa's found home in her music, and home can be anything for people: a boyfriend, husband, child, mother ... what home can represent makes it such an enormous record. That record is very special to me." The closing track, "More Than This", documents a relationship in which Carlton felt the other party "can never have enough. It's like if they don't want peace, it would just be peaceful. The song is saying how you could experience euphoria if, in this moment, you decided you didn't need any more than this. But I don't know ... Maybe it's hard to actively make that decision."

== Release and promotion ==
According to the News-Times, the album was originally scheduled for release in early 2007. Entertainment Weekly reported in June 2007 that the album was to be released on October 9, that the first single was "Nolita Fairytale", and that the second single may be "Hands on Me". Heroes & Thieves is also Carlton's first album on the Universal Motown music label, after she parted ways with A&M Records in 2004. In a November interview with Vibe magazine, Irv Gotti said of the response to Carlton's signing with the predominantly R&B and hip hop label The Inc.:

It's all good. They'll see it over the course of time. They'll see that we're both music people and that basically the approach that we're taking with Vanessa's album is... This is the first album that I don't have any pressures on the first week of her release. The whole thing with albums like that – when you look at Corinne Bailey Rae [Corinne Bailey Rae], Amy Winehouse [Back to Black], Nickelback [All the Right Reasons] – all of these albums are albums that you could work for like 18 months or 24 months and that's what I wanted to do and create with Vanessa. It's funny to me. It's the first time where maybe in the 20th week of her release, we'll catch fire. (Laughs) Like, you don't get that in hip hop! You don't get that in R&B! (Laughs) But this is something I can get. She's a singer-songwriter like you wouldn't believe.

It was reported in October 2007 that Carlton would embark on a concert tour, the Haunted Club Tour, from November 2 (Scottsdale, Arizona, U.S.) to November 24 (Montreal, Quebec, Canada). Carlton said that a guitarist and a violinist would accompany her. During the tour, she said that the music video for the second single, "Hands on Me", would be filmed in December, after which she would undertake a larger scale tour with a full band. Also by December, she was playing a series of live shows in association with radio stations. "Hands on Me" gained promotional support when it was prominently featured in promotional commercials for the CW show Gossip Girl. A stripped down version of the album track "More Than This" appears on the compilation Songs for Tibet.

=== Singles ===
The album's lead single was "Nolita Fairytale". Released on July 17, 2007, the single was met with generally favorable reviews. The single failed to chart on any major charts, appearing only on Billboard's Adult Top 40 chart, where it peaked at number 26. The video premiered on AOL Music on August 22. It debuted at number eleven on VH1's television show VSpot Top 20 Countdown, peaking at number five. "Hands on Me" was released as the album's official second single, peaking at number 30 on the Billboard Adult Top 40.

== Critical reception ==
Professional ratings
Aggregate scores
Source	Rating
Metacritic	79/100
Review scores
Source	Rating
AllMusic	3.5/5 stars
Billboard	4/5 stars
Blender	3.5/5 stars
The Boston Globe	Positive
Entertainment Weekly	B
PopMatters	8/10
Slant Magazine	3/5 stars

Heroes & Thieves received mostly positive reviews from music critics. At Metacritic, which assigns a "weighted average" rating out of 100 from selected independent ratings and reviews from mainstream critics, the album received a Metascore of 79/100, based on 8 reviews, indicating "generally favorable reviews".

AllMusic's Stephen Thomas Erlewine praised the album, stating "Given (Harmonium's) sophomore slump, it's not entirely surprising that for her third album, 2007's Heroes & Thieves, she's elected for a compromise between the two extremes: embracing the soft pop that brought her fame without rejecting the confessionals that distinguished her second ... and it's a nice return to the strengths of her debut."

Tony Sclafani of PopMatters rated the album an eight out of ten, commenting "Heroes & Thieves isn't a perfect album and sometimes gets too idiosyncratic and precious for its own good. It's already spawned its share of detractors, specifically reviewers who question whether Carlton has the vocal goods to pull off some of the more complicated numbers. I think her imperfect singing keeps her sounding human and give her props for not messing with a pitch correction program. And if you feel the same, well, maybe you too should start thinking you might have a problem with 'Nessa addiction. See you at the next 'Nessaholics meeting."

Neil Drumming of Entertainment Weekly praised the album as well, stating "With a youthful voice and a predilection for flowery lyrics, the 27-year-old still comes off as an angst-afflicted teenager adapting her diary into song — even though she's now rhapsodizing about adult stuff like rent-controlled apartments (Nolita Fairytale) and temp work (Hands on Me). This can be surprisingly touching and personal, as on the exuberant title track, or simply pretentious, as on Come Undone, where she muses, I'm a sycophantic courtier with an elegant repost. However precious her poetry can be, Carlton always pins it to melodies that morph and expand evocatively. Heroes climaxes grandly in the soaring ballad Home, followed by the choral volcano that is More Than This. As sappy as this combination is, the orchestral one-two punch is also inescapably moving. And it's the kind of thing Carlton does best — no matter what label she's on." The reviewer later awarded the album a "B" rating.

Slant Magazine's Sal Cinquemani gave the album a mixed review in their review, saying "Carlton's voice continues to mature (there's a gritty quality to her vocals on songs like "Fools Like Me", and the earthiness of guest Stevie Nicks's alto harmonies on the country-leaning "The One" tempers Carlton's more reedy lead vocal), but the material in general isn't exactly what you'd expect from an artist who left the nest in search of creative freedom and appreciation, making Heroes & Thieves somewhat less rewarding than her last album."

== Commercial performance ==
Heroes & Thieves debuted at No. 44 on the U.S. Billboard 200, selling 18,200 copies in its first week of release.

== Track listing ==
All tracks written by Vanessa Carlton, with additional writers noted.

No.	Title	Writer(s)	Length
1.	"Nolita Fairytale"	Stephan Jenkins	3:28
2.	"Hands on Me"	Jenkins	3:01
3.	"Spring Street"	Linda Perry	4:10
4.	"My Best"		3:00
5.	"Come Undone"	Jenkins	4:35
6.	"The One" (featuring Stevie Nicks)	Jenkins, Perry	4:05
7.	"Heroes & Thieves"		3:47
8.	"This Time"	Perry	3:49
9.	"Fools like Me"		3:10
10.	"Home"	Jenkins	5:38
11.	"More Than This"		4:48

== Charts ==
Weekly chart performance for Heroes & Thieves
Chart (2007)	Peak position
US Billboard 200	44
US Digital Albums (Billboard)	8

== Personnel ==
Credits adapted from Discogs

Musicians

- Vanessa Carlton – vocals, piano, keyboards, string arrangements
- Stephan Jenkins – acoustic guitar, keyboards, programming, percussion, group vocalist, harp arrangement, string arrangements
- Linda Perry – acoustic guitar, guitar, piano, Mellotron
- Stevie Nicks – vocals, guest appearance
- Tony Fredianelli – guitar
- Eric Schemerhorn – guitar
- Sebastian Steinburg – bass guitar
- Jon Evans – bass guitar
- Paul III – bass guitar
- Leo Kramer – bass guitar
- Brain – drums
- Nathan Wetherington – drums
- Brad Hargreaves – drums
- Matt Chamberlain – drums, percussion
- Luis Conte – percussion
- Herve Salters – keyboard
- Conor Heffernan – organ, group vocalist
- Hattie Webb – harp, group vocalist
- The Section Quartet – Strings
- Eric Gorfain – violin, string arrangements
- Daphne Chen – violin
- Leah Katz – viola
- Richard Dodd – cello
- Carla Kihlstedt – orchestrator
- Jason Martineau – orchestrator
- Michelle Maruyama – orchestrator
- Melissa Reese – background vocals, group vocalist
- Dionzya Sutton – group vocalist
- Ari Ingber – group vocalist (More Than This)
- Josh Ingber – group vocalist (More Than This)
- Lee Moretti – background vocalist (Come Undone), group vocalist (More Than This)

Technical personnel

- Executive producers: Vanessa Carlton, Stephan Jenkins, Irv "Gotti" Lorenzo
- Produced by: Stephan Jenkins ("Spring Street" and "This Time" produced by Linda Perry)
- Engineered by: Sean Beresford ("Spring Street" and "This Time" engineered by Linda Perry)
- Mixed by: Manny Maroquinn at Larrabee North Studios, Universal City, CA ("Spring Street" and "This Time" mixed by Bill Botrell at The Pass, Los Angeles, CA)
- Mastered by: Emily Lazar, assisted by Joe LaPorta at The Lodge, NYC
- A&R: Jolene Cherry and Irv Gotti
- A&R administration by: Darcell Lawrence, Errol Vaughn, Eliose Bryan, Nina Freeman, Tracy Tolmaire for Universal Motown
- Marketing: Tenisha Ramos for The Inc., Jill Capone for Universal Motown
- Creative art direction: Vanessa Carlton
- Art department by: Sandra Brummels and Christopher Kornmann
- Illustrator: James Riches
- Additional lettering by: Vanessa Carlton
- Boots by: Stevie Nicks
- Photography: Kurt Iswarienko
- Stylist: Elisa Goodkind, Goodkind Style, Inc
- Makeup: Lisa Storey, The Wall Group
- Hair: Damian Monzillo, Celestine
- Agency: Mitch Rose for CAA
- Management: Jordan Feldstein
- Publicity: Dvora Vener-Engelfeild for BWR Public Relations; Tracy Zamotand Kim Harris for Universal Motown
- Legal: Tim Mandelbaum, Esq; Monika Tashman; Selveme, Mandelbaum and Mintz
- Business manager: Phil Sarna for PSBM
