= Gautam Vig =

Indian actor (born 1987)

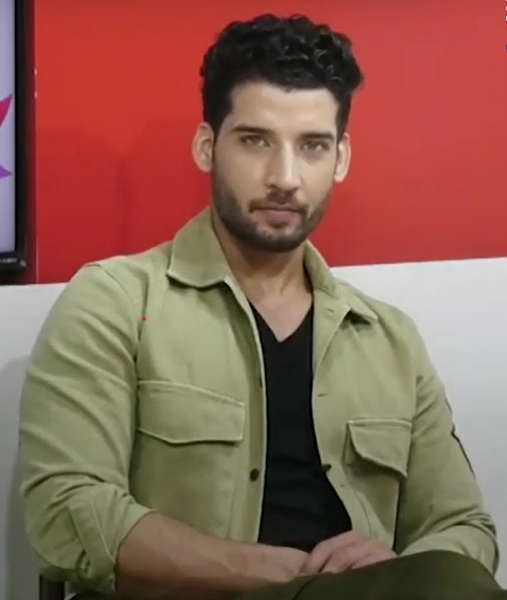
- Vig in 2021
- Born: 27 September 1987 (age 38); New Delhi, India
- Education: Guru Harkrishan Public School, New Delhi
- Occupations: Actor; model
- Years active: 2015–present
- Known for: Bigg Boss 16; Lekar Hum Deewana Dil

Gautam Vig (born 27 September 1987) is an Indian model and actor who primarily work in hindi television.He is best known for his roles in Saath Nibhaana Saathiya 2 and Junooniyatt. In 2022, he participated in Bigg Boss 16.

== Early life ==
Gautam Vig was born on 27 September 1987 in New Delhi, India. He attended the Guru Harkrishan Public School. On 17 August 2013, Vig married Richa Gera, sister of television actor Ankit Gera in Delhi. The couple were divorced in 2020.

== Career ==
He shot for the promo with Salman Khan for Bigg Boss 9. Vig made his acting debut in 2017 as Ali Khan in StarPlus's Naamkarann. That same year, he portrayed Sameer in the Hindi film Flat 211. He was seen playing recurring roles in various television shows, including Ishq Subhan Allah as Miraj Ahmed, MTV Nishedh as Raghav and Pinjara Khubsurti Ka as Piyush Shukla.

In 2021, he played Ayaaz, in short film Haale Dil on Broken Notes, opposite Mannara Chopra. In 2022, he participated in the reality show Bigg Boss 16 on Colors TV and was eliminated on day 48. From February to November 2023, Vig portrayed Jordan Mehta, a musician, in Colors TV's romantic musical drama Junooniyatt.

== Personal life ==
Vig was previously married and their marriage ended in a divorce in 2020.

== Filmography ==
=== Films ===
Key
†	Denotes films that have not yet been released

Year	Title	Role	Ref.
2017	Flat 211	Sameer	
2021	Haale Dil on Broken Notes	Ayaaz	
2023	Hukus Bukus	Vikram Rathi	

=== Television ===
Year	Title	Role	Ref.
2015	Bigg Boss 9	—N/a	
2017–2018	Naamkarann	Ali Khan	
2018–2019	Ishq Subhan Allah	Miraj Ahmed	
2018–2019	Tantra	Akshat Roy Kapoor	
2020	Pinjara Khubsurti Ka	Piyush Shukla	
2021	Agni Vayu	Vayu	
2022	Saath Nibhaana Saathiya 2	Surya Seth	
2022	Bigg Boss 16	Contestant	
2023	Junooniyatt	Jordan	
2024	Dalchini	Karan Dhillon	
2024 - 2025	Lekar Hum Deewana Dil	Samrat Singh	
2026–present	Sayoneee	Aditya Singh Virk	

=== Web series ===
Year	Title	Role	Ref.
2020	MTV Nishedh	Raghav	
2021	Hai Taubba	—N/a	
TBA	The Socho Project †	TBA	

=== Music videos ===
Year	Title	Singer(s)	Ref.
2023	Dooriyan	Altaaf Sayyed	
2023	Bewafa Se Pyaar Kiya	Jubin Nautiyal	
2024	Ishq Hua Hai Tumse	Javed Ali	
2024	Laage Na Jiya	Vikrant Bhartiya	
2024	Haule Haule	Jay Yadav	
2025	Tu Wahan Saans Le	Saurabh Gangal	
