= MTV Dark Scroll =

- Genre: Paranormal; Reality
- Presented by: Amit Sadh (Host); Sarbajeet Mohanty; Pooja Vijay (Paranormal Experts); Nayera Ahuja (Paralogger)
- Starring: See below
- Country of origin: India
- Original language: Hindi
- No. of episodes: 21

Production
- Producer: Celebfame Entertainment
- Production location: Uttarakhand
- Running time: 40 mins

Original release
- Network: MTV India; JioCinema
- Release: 16 August – 29 September 2024

MTV Dark Scroll – Muqabla Anjaan Se (transl. MTV Dark Scroll – Competition with the Unknown) is an Indian paranormal reality television series. Filmed in Uttarakhand and hosted by Amit Sadh. It broadcasts on MTV India from 16 August to 29 September 2024 and streams digitally on JioCinema. It also features paranormal experts Sarbajeet Mohanty and Pooja Vijay.

== Format ==
Nine seekers will embark on an exploratory adventure across seven of the most haunted locations in Uttarakhand, confronting supernatural challenges and their deepest fears.

== Contestants ==
Seekers	Age	Hometown	Status
Paarth Idnani	21	Mumbai	Winner; 29 September
Sahil Shukla	24	Dehradun	Runner-up; 29 September
Swati Gahlawat	22	Sonipat	Eliminated; 28 September
Anubhuti Mehta	21	Delhi	Eliminated; 28 September
Aryan Singh	19	Noida	Eliminated; 28 September
Sanskruti "Sasa" Salunke	21	Mumbai	Eliminated; 22 September
Shambhavi "Angel" Sharma	20	Jaipur	Withdrew; 13 September
Mian Mian	20	Itanagar	Eliminated; 8 September
Kartik Rawat	21	Dehradun	Ejected; 25 August

== Investigation summary ==
	Week														
	1		2		3		4		5		6		7		
	16-18 Aug		23-25 Aug		30 Aug-01 Sep		06-08 Sep		13-15 Sep		20-22 Sep		27-28 Sep		29 Sep
	Lambi Dehar Mines		Doonga Haveli		Tea Estate		Radha Bhavan		Hathipaon School		Pines Old Cementry		Abbott Hospital		
Paarth	TOP		IN		BTM	SAFE	IN		IN		TOP		TOP		WINNER
Sahil	TOP		TOP		TOP		IN		TOP		IN		TOP		RUNNER-UP
Swati	IN		IN		IN		TOP		TOP		TOP		IN	ELIM	
Anubhuti	TOP		TOP		IN		IN		BTM	SAFE	IN		IN	ELIM	
Aryan	BTM	SAFE	TOP		IN		TOP		IN		BTM	SAFE	IN	ELIM	
Sasa	IN		IN		IN		BTM	SAFE	BTM	SAFE	BTM	ELIM			
Angel	IN		TOP		TOP		TOP		QUIT						
Mian	IN		IN		IN		BTM	ELIM							
Kartik	BTM	SAFE	IN	EJEC											
Notes	1		1, 2		1		1, 3		1		1, 4		1		5

=== Notes ===
- ^Note 1: The seekers were divided into teams.

Team 1
Team 2
Team 3

- ^Note 2: Team 3 didn't complete their investigation.
- ^Note 3: Mian Mian was eliminated directly without performing the dare.
- ^Note 4: Aryan completed the dare and advanced, resulting in Sasa's elimination.
- ^Note 5: Parth received winning cash prize money ₹5,00,000.

(TOP) The seeker was one of the top entries in the team investigation.
(IN) The seeker wasn't a top or bottom entry in the team investigation.
(BTM) The seeker was one of the bottom entries in the team investigation and had to perform a dare in order to stay in the journey.
(SAFE) The seeker was one of the bottom entries in the team investigation but did not perform a dare and was safe.
(SAFE) The seeker performed the dare and advanced.
(ELIM) The seeker was eliminated.
(EJEC) The seeker violated major rules and was ejected.

== Production ==
The series was announced on 23 July 2024 on MTV India. The trailer of the series was released on 30 July 2024.
