= 90's House =

American reality television series

- Genre: Reality competition
- Presented by: Lance Bass; Christina Milian
- Country of origin: United States
- Original language: English
- No. of seasons: 1
- No. of episodes: 8

Production
- Executive producers: Austyn Biggers; Adam Cohen; Pamela Post; Cara Tapper; Joanna Vernetti
- Production company: Super Delicious Productions

Original release
- Network: MTV; MTV2
- Release: September 26 – November 17, 2017

Related
- MTV's The 70s House

90's House is an American reality television series broadcast on MTV before being moved to MTV2 due to low ratings. The show aired for eight episodes from September 26 to November 17, 2017, and featured 12 "millennial" housemates living in a house set in the 1990s while participating in various 1990s-themed challenges. The winner received $90,000, a Mazda Miata and tickets for two on board the Ship-Hop I Love the 90s Cruise.

Each episode had a challenge called "Who Got Game" and sometimes a mini challenge, which provided an advantage in the "Who Got Game" challenge. At the end of each episode, contestants who were safe stayed in the house and were considered to be "Chillin'", while those at risk for elimination had to step onto the bounce pad, where one or more housemates would be deemed "Illin'" and be eliminated. Long Island native Sha'Monique Wynter was crowned the winner.

== Contestants ==
- Chase
- Devin
- Jenielle
- Lexus
- Mark
- Patrick
- Prince
- Sha-Monique
- Shannon
- Sierra
- Travana
- William

== Results ==
	Episodes							
Contestants	1	2	3	4	5	6	7	8
Sha-monique	WIN	WIN	SAFE	RISK	SAFE	SAFE	WIN	WINNER
Sierra	SAFE	WIN	SAFE	WIN	SAFE	RISK	RISK	OUT
Devin	WIN	SAFE	SAFE	WIN	RISK	RISK	SAFE	OUT
Jenielle	SAFE	WIN	WIN	RISK	RISK	SAFE	OUT	GUEST
Chase	RISK	RISK	SAFE	RISK	RISK	WIN	OUT	GUEST
Prince	RISK	RISK	SAFE	SAFE	SAFE	OUT		GUEST
Shannon	WIN	WIN	RISK	SAFE	OUT			GUEST
Patrick	SAFE	SAFE	SAFE	OUT				GUEST
Mark	RISK	SAFE	OUT					GUEST
Lexus	SAFE	WIN	OUT					GUEST
William	WIN	OUT						GUEST
Travana	OUT							GUEST

== Episodes ==
No.	Title	Original release date	U.S. viewers (millions)
1	"Welcome to the 90's!"	September 26, 2017	0.318
2	"The One with the Music Videos"	October 3, 2017	0.261
3	"The One with all the Pick-up Lines"	October 10, 2017	0.255
4	"The One with the Movie Posters"	October 17, 2017	0.172
5	"The One with the Sitcom"	October 24, 2017	N/A
6	"The One with the Rap Battle"	October 31, 2017	N/A
7	"The One with the Icons"	November 10, 2017	N/A
8	"The One with the Big Finale"	November 17, 2017	N/A

== Predecessor ==
This show is based on MTV's The 70s House, which aired in 2005 and focused on the culture of the 1970s.
