= MTV What the Hack! =

- Genre: Comedy; Infotainment
- Developed by: Ankit Fadia
- Starring: Ankit Fadia; VJ Jose
- Country of origin: India
- No. of seasons: 1
- No. of episodes: 10

Original release
- Network: MTV India
- Release: 18 October 2009

MTV What the Hack! is a TV show that aired on MTV India. The first season of the show premiered on MTV India on 18 October 2009 and concluded on 7 February 2010. The show talks about interesting things that people can do with computers, the Internet, and technology. It is hosted by Ankit Fadia and VJ Jose, and airs on Saturdays at 8:20 PM. According to the MTV India website, MTV has got Ankit Fadia to give viewers everything from tips, tricks to cheat codes that will help make peoples life on the World Wide Web a whole lot simpler. Internet users email their problems to MTV India and Ankit gives them the solution.

When MTV India dropped Music Television from its name and logo, this show was one of the new shows that was introduced and was positioned as a web show that aired on television and also on the MTV India website. This 10 minute show is entirely shot at the MTV studio in Mumbai and most of the show is unscripted improvisation. In an interview with Rediff.com, the show creators share that What The Hack! is not a show about hacking or security, but about things you can do with technology. It is humorous and light-hearted, and is neither too technical nor too basic.

== See also ==
- Ankit Fadia
