= Follow the Rules =

Television series

- Genre: Reality
- Starring: Ja Rule
- Country of origin: United States
- Original language: English
- No. of seasons: 1
- No. of episodes: 12

Production
- Executive producers: Jeffrey Atkins; Shakim Compere; Irv Gotti; Queen Latifah; Christian Sarabia
- Running time: 22 minutes
- Production companies: 51 Minds Entertainment; Flavor Unit Entertainment; MTV Production Development

Original release
- Network: MTV
- Release: October 26 – December 7, 2015

Follow the Rules is an American reality television series starring hip-hop artist Ja Rule. The series premiered on October 26, 2015, on MTV, and follows the life of Ja Rule and his family.

== Episodes ==
No.	Title	Original release date	US viewers (millions)
1	"Ja-Fooled"	October 26, 2015	0.38
2	"Breakin' the Rules"	November 2, 2015	0.24
3	"Get It In the Hole"	November 9, 2015	0.35
4	"Ja Momma Knows Best"	November 9, 2015	0.34
5	"Cookie Thief"	November 16, 2015	0.38
6	"The Dating Game"	November 16, 2015	0.35
7	"Think Before You Ink"	November 23, 2015	0.42
8	"Going Viral"	November 23, 2015	0.41
9	"Better Safe Than Sorry"	November 30, 2015	0.35
10	"The Rules of Nature"	November 30, 2015	0.39
11	"Mo' Money Mo' Problems"	December 7, 2015	0.34
12	"It's All Downhill From Here"	December 7, 2015	0.31
