= Nolita Fairytale =

Single by Vanessa Carlton

from the album Heroes & Thieves
- Released: July 17, 2007 (U.S.)
- Genre: Indie pop; piano rock
- Length: 3:27
- Label: The Inc.
- Songwriters: Vanessa Carlton; Stephan Jenkins

Vanessa Carlton singles chronology
"Who's to Say" (2005)	"Nolita Fairytale" (2007)	"Hands on Me" (2008)

"Nolita Fairytale" is a song by American singer-songwriter Vanessa Carlton, the first single from her third studio album, Heroes & Thieves (2007), released digitally on the iTunes Store and to American radio stations on July 17, 2007.

== Theme ==
According to Carlton, the song is about her life in Nolita (a neighborhood of New York City) and, in her words, "the series of revelations I have had over the past few years." It documents major changes in her life from 2005 to 2007, including touring with Stevie Nicks (who is thanked in the song), buying her own home, getting a puppy and, as she put it, "staying in one spot for more than a couple weeks". The song also includes a reference to Carlton's departure from her previous record label, A&M Records. She said that developing her life in Nolita "gave me peace and clarity. I lead a pretty enchanted life." The line "Ruby's in the afternoon" refers to a café in Nolita and one of Carlton's favorite neighborhood hangouts.

On June 19, Irv Gotti, head of Carlton's record label The Inc. Records, released a video of an interview with Carlton and a performance of the song live from her apartment intercut with shots of Nolita.

== Composition ==
"Nolita Fairytale" is composed in common time and the key of E♭ major. It follows the common strophic verse-chorus format, with a bridge between the second and third chorus repetitions. The refrain keeps the melody, with changing lyrics.

== Chart position ==
"Nolita Fairytale" was Carlton's first lead single to not enter the US Billboard Hot 100. It debuted at number 26 on the US Adult Top 40 chart, where it spent twelve weeks.

== Personnel ==
- Vanessa Carlton: vocals, background vocals, piano
- Matt Chamberlain: drums, percussion
- Stephan Jenkins: percussion
- Tony Fredianelli: guitar
- Sebastian Steinburg: bass

== Release ==
"Nolita Fairytale" was officially released to U.S. radio on July 17, 2007. It was made available for download at the iTunes Store. Entertainment Weekly wrote, "if [the single ...] isn't in heavy radio and MTV rotation by the end of summer, I'll be surprised".

The music video for "Nolita Fairytale" was shot in the area of Lafayette Street and Bond Street in the Noho (North of Houston) part of Manhattan (New York City) on July 28, 2007. The beginning of the video is a step-by-step duplication of the video for Carlton's first single, "A Thousand Miles" (2002), until Carlton gets up and walks away from the traveling grand piano, which a yellow taxicab crashes into and destroys. Throughout the video, a few things from fairy tales can be seen such as a girl letting her hair out from a window in an apartment building (Rapunzel), a man with butterfly wings, giant mushrooms, a giant spider moving and spinning a web at the same time, a man playing fetch with a wolf in Central Park, a candy covered apartment (Hansel and Gretel), a policeman riding a unicorn, and moving chess pieces. Carlton said that the "A Thousand Miles" video "trumped everything else [...] They don't know who I am, they don't know the song, they don't know any of it. But they know the traveling piano video. To start anew, you have to kind of open the old book and then close it so you can then open the next book." The video was directed by Marc Klasfeld, the director of the "A Thousand Miles" video and produced by Media Magik.

The video premiered on AOL Music on August 22. "Nolita Fairytale" was played at the end of the November 28, 2007 episode of The CW's television show Gossip Girl.

== Charts ==
Chart (2007)	Peak position
US Adult Pop Airplay (Billboard)	26
