= Attrition (website) =

Attrition is an information security-related website, created in October, 1998, which used to be updated at least weekly by an all-volunteer staff. Until 21 May 2001, Attrition maintained the largest mirror of defaced (or cracked) websites available on the World Wide Web. The defacement mirror has since ceased updating. The site contains a variety of information, including movie and music reviews, poetry, and security tips covering topics like forensics, data theft, and security advisories.

In 2001, attrition.org was given a cease and desist order by lawyers of MasterCard for posting parodies of its "Priceless" advertising campaign, which they claim violated copyright law. An argument between attrition.org and MasterCard ensued, resulting in their communications and one final "Priceless" parody being posted online.

In 2006, Republican communications aide Todd Shriber attempted to hire Attrition to crack his former university's website. Shriber was then sacked from his job for attempting to solicit a hacker to inflate his GPA.

Attrition formerly hosted several electronic mailing lists relating to information security, such as InfoSec News. It also maintained the Data Loss Database, which recorded company experienced data breaches.
