= MTV Reality Stars =

- Genre: Sitcom
- Created by: Nikhil Taneja
- Written by: Nikhil Taneja; Adhir Bhat; Kautuk Srivastava; Sid Mathur
- Directed by: Gaurav Khindaria
- Original language: Hindi
- No. of seasons: 1
- No. of episodes: 12

Production
- Producer: MTV India
- Production location: Mumbai, Maharashtra
- Running time: Approx. 22 minutes

Original release
- Network: MTV India
- Release: 16 March – 1 June 2013

MTV Reality Stars is an Indian sitcom. The series was created by Nikhil Taneja that captures the comedy and chaos in the Showbiz industry. The series also features cameos by Bollywood filmmaker Anurag Kashyap and Bollywood actors Arshad Warsi and Anand Tiwari. The 12-episode first season of the show aired from 16 March 2013 to 1 June 2013.

== Plot ==
MTV Reality Stars follows the travails of four friends and roommates, Kuldeep Sodhi, Zamir Akhtar, Krish Batra and Tania Sharma as they try to "make it" in the industry. Krish writes reality shows, Kuldeep wants to be on a reality show, Tania is a reality show reject and Zameer hates reality shows.

The show features a reality show within it called MTV Rejects, a show that tries to find the country's biggest reject. The script of this show has been written by Krish and Tanya is in the production team. Kuldeep wants to be a part of the show so desperately that he stages a mock fight with Zameer to grab the attention of the show-makers. The show makers also select Zameer (the Reality-hater) along with Kuldeep. Krish and Tania try to get Zameer out in the first episode. As luck might have it, Kuldeep is ousted instead and Zameer (the Reality hater) stays on the reality show. As the show progresses, unexpected things keep on happening, as the reality of reality TV is revealed. Things go so wrong that these four, who had come to Mumbai to be superstars, end up being reality stars. Nikhil Taneja, the creator of the show says, "It took us almost a year and a half to conceptualize the show. We have treated it like a feature film. Anyone who enjoys reality and friendship will love it."

== Characters ==
This group of 4 friends are the main characters in this show. Each of these 4 characters are stereotype friends observed in any college friend group.

Kuldeep Sodhi is a 25-year-old jatt from Gurdaaspur. He is the bodybuilder in the group who has come to Mumbai to become a reality star.

Zamir Akhtar is a 26-year-old Muslim from Chandni Chowk, Delhi. He is a former engineer. He has come to Mumbai to become an actor. He is secretly in love with Tania.

Krish Batra is a 24-year-old guy from Mumbai. He and the whole group lives off his father's money. He is a writer for reality shows, but his dream in life is to make a "good movie", the sort that Ayan Mukherjee and Farhan Akhtar debuted with. But he is alternately preoccupied, so he never gets to writing it.

Tania Sharma is a 25-year-old girl from Kolkata. She is pretty, cute but slightly blonde and doesn't know it. She is dating Krish and lives with him. She came to Bombay to become a reality star and even got a show but after that she's never got any work. She thinks she has moved on, and is now doing production on reality shows... but somewhere, she still has ambitions to be a reality star

== Promotion ==
MTV Reality Stars is being promoted as the "Reality behind reality". As a part of the promotional campaign, MTV India are also giving a chance to college students to be a part of an episode of this show.
