= MTV's The 70s House =

- Genre: Reality competition
- Created by: Aaron Matthew Lee
- Starring: Natasha Leggero; Aaron Matthew Lee; Bil Dwyer
- Country of origin: United States
- Original language: English
- No. of seasons: 1
- No. of episodes: 10

Production
- Executive producers: Adam Cohen; Cara Tapper; Joanna Vernetti
- Production company: Super Delicious Productions

Original release
- Network: MTV
- Release: July 5 – September 6, 2005

Related
- 90's House

MTV's The 70s House is an American reality television show created by Aaron Matthew Lee. The show premiered on MTV on July 5 and ended on September 6, 2005. The show featured twelve contestants participating in a 24/7 simulation of the 1970s. They were required to part with all modern technology including cell phones, laptops, and MP3 players, as well as all modern clothing and lingo, only to adopt their cultural equivalents of the 1970s.

== Overview ==
On each episode contestants were assigned tasks by Oscar, the house's unseen owner who communicated over speakerphone in a parody of Charlie's Angels. Dawn, the show's host, acted as a liaison between the contestants and Oscar and instructed them on how to complete the tasks. After finishing the task Oscar awarded a prize to the contestant (or team) which best completed the task. Two contestants were then chosen, based on that day's performance and how well they otherwise kept their 70s facade. These contestants competed in an elimination challenge at the end of the show and the loser would be eliminated from the show. In the ninth episode, however, three contestants competed in the elimination round and two were eliminated.

Stand-up comedian Natasha Leggero played Dawn, while Bil Dwyer played the elimination challenge host, Bert Van Styles. Guest judges included Erik Estrada, Jimmie Walker and Leif Garrett.

== Results ==
Contestant	Episode									
Contestant	1	2	3	4	5	6	7	8	9	10
Andrew	RISK	WIN	WIN	WIN	WIN	WIN	WIN	SAFE	WIN	WIN
Joey	WIN	WIN	SAFE	WIN	RISK	SAFE	WIN	SAFE	RISK	OUT
Corey	SAFE	WIN	WIN	WIN	WIN	SAFE	RISK	RISK	OUT	
Sarah	WIN	SAFE	RISK	SAFE	WIN	SAFE	WIN	WIN	OUT	
Lynda	SAFE	SAFE	WIN	RISK	SAFE	RISK	SAFE	OUT		
Ashley	SAFE	SAFE	SAFE	IMM	SAFE	SAFE	OUT			
Jami	WIN	SAFE	WIN	SAFE	WIN	OUT				
Ruben	WIN	WIN	WIN	WIN	OUT					
Hailley	WIN	RISK	SAFE	OUT						
Peter	WIN	WIN	OUT							
Lee	SAFE	OUT								
Geo	OUT									

The contestant won the 70s House
The contestant won the challenge
The contestant was awarded immunity and did not compete in the main challenge
The contestant did not win the challenge, but was awarded safety
The contestant faced an elimination challenge and won
The contestant was eliminated from the competition

== Episodes ==
No.	Title	Original release date
1	"Welcome to the 1970s"	July 5, 2005
Challenge: A basketball game against a high school team; Winners: Dyn-o-mites (Joey, Hailley, Jami, Peter, Ruben, Sarah); Elimination Round: Operation; Bottom two: Andrew and Geo; Eliminated: Geo
2	"Disco Duck"	July 12, 2005
Challenge: A disco dance showdown; Winners: the Dudes (Andrew, Corey, Joey, Peter, Ruben); Elimination Round: Climb That Mountain; Bottom two: Hailley and Lee; Eliminated: Lee
3	"Dodge Ball"	July 19, 2005
Challenge: A game of dodgeball against pro wrestlers; Winners: Ruben's team (Ruben, Andrew, Corey, Jami, Lynda); Elimination Round: Liars' Lounge; Bottom two: Peter and Sarah; Eliminated: Peter
4	"Car Wash"	July 26, 2005
Challenge: An endurance Car Wash; Winners: Andrew, Corey, Joey, Ruben; Immune: Ashley; Elimination Round: Supermarket Shenanigans; Bottom two: Hailley and Lynda; Eliminated: Hailley
5	"Love Boat"	August 2, 2005
Challenge: Matching eight couples on a cruise; Winners: Red Team (Jami, Andrew, Sarah, Corey); Elimination Round: Limbo; Bottom two: Joey and Ruben; Eliminated: Ruben
6	"You're So Vain"	August 9, 2005
Challenge: Mr. & Miss Red White & Blue beauty pageant; Winner: Andrew; Safe: Ashley and Sarah; Elimination Round: What's Your Sign?; Bottom two: Jami and Lynda; Eliminated: Jami
7	"Roller Boogie"	August 16, 2005
Challenge: Have unsuspecting strangers joining in on the Hustle or Jazzercise; Winners: Team Jazzercise (Andrew, Joey, Sarah); Elimination Round: Roller Boogie Showdown; Bottom two: Ashley and Corey; Eliminated: Ashley
8	"Five Sticks of Dynamite"	August 23, 2005
Challenge: Performing an original song; Winner: Sarah; Elimination Round: What's That Song?; Bottom two: Lynda and Corey; Eliminated: Lynda
9	"Tiger Beat"	August 30, 2005
Challenge: Tiger Beat Magazine pin-up; Winner: Andrew; Elimination Round: Spaghetti Holes eating challenge; Bottom three: Corey, Joey, Sarah; Eliminated: Corey and Sarah
10	"Andrew Wins!"	September 6, 2005
Challenge: 70s Decathlon; Winner: Andrew

== Successor ==
A similar show centered around 1990s culture called 90's House premiered on MTV in 2017.
