= Scrubbing In =

- Genre: Reality
- Starring: Heather; Adrian; Tyrice; Chris; Michelle; Chelsey; Fernando; Crystal; Nikki
- Country of origin: United States
- Original language: English
- No. of seasons: 1
- No. of episodes: 10

Production
- Executive producers: David Osper; Joel Rodgers; Mark Cronin; Shannon Fitzgerald
- Camera setup: Multiple
- Production company: Never Nominated

Original release
- Network: MTV
- Release: October 24 – December 26, 2013

Scrubbing In is an American reality television series that aired on MTV from October 24 until December 26, 2013. It chronicles a group of travel nurses who relocated from across the United States to Orange County, California, where they work in a hospital together. The series premiere acquired 673,000 viewers.

The show was cancelled after one season.
