= Hands on Me (Vanessa Carlton song) =

2008 single by Vanessa Carlton

Single by Vanessa Carlton

from the album Heroes & Thieves
- Released: February 19, 2008 (U.S.)
- Genre: Pop rock; piano rock
- Length: 3:00
- Label: The Inc.
- Songwriters: Vanessa Carlton; Stephan Jenkins

Vanessa Carlton singles chronology
"Nolita Fairytale" (2007)	"Hands on Me" (2008)	"Carousel" (2011)

"Hands on Me" is a song by American singer-songwriter Vanessa Carlton, released as the second single from her third studio album, Heroes & Thieves (2007). According to the website FMQB.com, it was released to mainstream contemporary hit radio in the United States on February 19, 2008 (see 2008 in music). It was mentioned as a possible choice for the second single in a June 2007 article in Entertainment Weekly, which wrote that it "sounded tailor-made for a rom-com trailer coming soon to a theater near you." Irv Gotti, the head of Carlton's label, The Inc. Records, was quoted as saying that the song reminded him of the 1985 film The Breakfast Club.

Carlton debuted the song live in June 2005 at The Living Room in New York City. One of its working titles was "Put Your Hands on Me", about which Slant Magazine wrote:

In fact, the provocative nature of the title—the song is actually more of a spiritual one—might just be the direction Carlton needs to go in to sustain her career. Singer/songwriter/pianists are a dime a dozen and one of the things Carlton's got going for her is her ability to tap into the fact that most teens are more earnest than disaffected, and her willingness to expose that delicate, naked, and unbridled sexual honesty of youth is a much-welcomed reprieve from hip-hop and pop music's hollow commodification of women and sex.

The title was shortened to "Hands on Me" because Joss Stone has a song with the original title on her 2007 album, Introducing Joss Stone.

== Critical reception ==
Billboard has also given "Hands on Me" a positive review, stating that the "chorus gallops alongside plentiful piano strings, percussion and one hook after another, while the lyric taps into earnest desire". In their review, the magazine also noted that due to the lack of airplay for Carlton's recent singles, this song has to "wrap itself around radio to keep this talented artist relevant".

Another critic, Jonathon Newan, stated "Hands on Me is a worthy successor of Carlton's late and unfortunately unsuccessful White Houses; nonetheless, it shows earnest[ness], honesty, and raw compassion - it's a beautiful song sung by a beautifully humble artist."

== Music video ==
The music video was filmed in December 2007. It premiered February 15, 2008 on Yahoo! Music.

== Charts ==
Chart (2008)	Peak position
US Adult Pop Airplay (Billboard)	30

== Credits and personnel ==
- Vanessa Carlton: Piano, Keyboards, vocals, group vocals
- Tony Fredianelli: guitar
- Jon Evans: bass
- Matt Chamberlain: drums, percussion
- Stephan Jenkins: percussion, group vocals, string arrangements
- Carl Kihlstedt: orchestrator
- Melissa Reese: background and group vocals
- Dionzya Sutton: group vocals
- Lyn Berry: group vocals
