= MTV (India) =

Indian pay television channel

- Logo used since 2022
- Country: India
- Broadcast area: India; Bhutan; Mauritius; Nepal; Pakistan; South Africa; Maldives; Sri Lanka; United States; Afghanistan; Bangladesh; United Arab Emirates

Programming
- Language: Hindi
- Picture format: 1080p HDTV (downscaled to letterboxed 576p for the SDTV feed)

Ownership
- Owner: JioStar (branding licensed from Skydance EMEA)
- Sister channels: Colors Infinity

History
- Launched: 28 October 1996; 30 years ago

Links
- Website: www.mtvindia.com www.youtube.com/@MTVIndiaa

Availability

Streaming media
- JioHotstar: India
- YouTube: India

MTV is an Indian pay television channel specialising in music, reality and youth culture programming. It was launched in 1996 as the Indian version of the original American network and is owned by JioStar, under a licence agreement with Skydance EMEA. Most of the programming on the channel is produced in Hindi. MTV India has its headquarters in Vile Parle in Mumbai. The channel airs songs of Bollywood and all non-film songs of Hindi, Punjabi, Bhojpuri, Rajasthani, Haryanvi, Qawwali, Ghazal, Pahari, Sufi, English, K-pop, UK Asian, Fusion and Rock through Pump Up Mornings, Specials and Chillax only

== Related channels ==
In 2014, Viacom 18 launched Pepsi MTV Indies, an indie music and subculture channel in partnership with Pepsi Co.

In 2016, MTV Indies was replaced by MTV Beats, a 24-hour music-only channel. After its launch, MTV India changed its focus on broadcasting reality series.

VH1 India aired the international productions of MTV instead of airing them on MTV India, along with international music until its closure in 2025.

== Programming ==
MTV has numerous programs, including MTV Splitsvilla, MTV Dark Scroll, MTV Hustle and Brave Combat Federation.

== VJs ==
=== Former ===
- Amrita Arora
- Anusha Dandekar
- Ayushmann Khurrana
- Gaelyn Mendonca
- Bani J
- Baseer Ali
- Benafsha Soonwalla
- Cyrus Broacha
- Cyrus Sahukar
- Deepti Gujral
- José Covaco
- Malaika Arora
- Maria Goretti
- Mia Uyeda
- Mini Mathur
- Nafisa Joseph
- Nikhil Chinapa
- Raageshwari Loomba
- Ramona Arena
- Rannvijay Singh
- Rhea Chakraborty
- Shenaz Treasury
- Siddharth Bhardwaj
- Sophie Choudry
- Sunanda Wong

== Awards ==
- Fully Faltoo Film Awards
- Lycra MTV Style Awards
- MTV Immies
- MTV VMAs
- MTV Hustle
- MTV Youth Icon of the Year

== MTV Fully Faltoo Films ==
A series of spoof films under the banner of MTV Fully Faltoo Films were produced by MTV. The first film Ghoom, a spoof of the 2004 film Dhoom was released theatrically on 2 June 2006. Three more spoof films "Jadoo Ek Bar" (Jodhaa Akbar), "Bechaare Zameen Par" (Taare Zameen Par) and "Cheque De India" (Chak De! India) aired on MTV under "Fully Faltoo Film Festival" from 20 September 2008 to 4 October 2008.
